= Michele Carringer =

American politician (born 1962)

Member of the Tennessee House of Representatives from the 16th district
- Incumbent
- Assumed office January 12, 2021
- Preceded by: Bill Dunn

Personal details
- Born: Michele McCrary; February 4, 1962 (age 64)
- Party: Republican
- Spouse: Michael Carringer
- Children: 2
- Education: University of Tennessee
- Website: House website Campaign website

Michele Carringer (née McCrary; born February 4, 1962) is an American politician who serves in the Tennessee House of Representatives from the 16th district as a member of the Republican Party. Before her tenure in the state house, she was a member of the Knox County Commission.

== Early life and education ==
Carringer was born on February 4, 1962, to parents Jack and Irene (née Swain) McCrary. She is one of three siblings. In 1980, she graduated from Central High School where she was on the cheerleading squad. She later attended the University of Tennessee.

== Career ==
Carringer works in advertising. In 2016, she ran and won an election to the Knox County Commission. Carringer is a member of the National Rifle Association.

== Tennessee House of Representatives (2021–present) ==
=== Elections ===
In 2020, Carringer ran for election to the Tennessee House of Representatives' 16th district, a Knox County district held by retiring member Bill Dunn. She faced and defeated Knox County School Board member Patti Bounds in the Republican primary, before beating Elizabeth Rowland in the general election. She was re-elected in 2022 and 2024.

=== Tenure ===
In 2023, Carringer signed U.S. Term Limits's pledge to support calling a constitutional convention for term limits on members of the United States Congress.

On March 30, 2023, Democratic representatives Gloria Johnson, Justin Jones, and Justin Pearson violated House decorum rules during a protest following a school shooting at The Covenant School in Nashville. Carringer voted to expel all three representatives for their role in the protest. Jones and Pearson were expelled, while Johnson was not.

In 2024, Carringer sponsored legislation allowing international medical graduates to obtain a temporary license to work and earn money at the hospital while finishing residency. The bill went into effect in January 2025.

In 2025, after the assassination of Charlie Kirk, Carringer called for the resignation of Tamar Shirinian, a University of Tennessee professor. Shirinian had commented on a friend's private social media post that "world is better off without [Kirk] in it." Several other Tennessee representatives also called for the firing of university professors critical of Kirk. Six months later, Carringer supported the "Charlie Kirk Act," strengthening free speech protections for professors on college campuses, while also allowing the suspension or expulsion of students walking out or protesting campus events. Carringer denied that her advocacy for the firing of Shirinian and her support for the bill were in conflict.

==== Committee assignments ====
Carringer's committee assignments are below:

- Chair, Population Health Subcommittee
- Member, Education Committee of Extraordinary Session
- Member, Health Committee
- Member, Immigration Committee of Extraordinary Session
- Member, State & Local Government Committee
- Member, Departments & Agencies Subcommittee

== Personal life ==
Carringer is married to Michael Carringer. She has two children. She is a Southern Baptist, and attends attends Sevier Heights Church in Knoxville.
