= Bryan Terry =

American politician (born 1968)

Member of the Tennessee House of Representatives from the 48th district
- Incumbent
- Assumed office January 13, 2015
- Preceded by: Joe Carr

Personal details
- Born: October 27, 1968 (age 58)
- Party: Republican
- Spouse: Cheryl Terry
- Children: 2
- Education: University of Oklahoma (BS); University of Oklahoma College of Medicine (MD)
- Profession: Anesthesiologist
- Website: House website Campaign website

Bryan Terry (born October 27, 1968) is an American anesthesiologist and politician serving as a member of the Tennessee House of Representatives from the 48th district. A member of the Republican Party, he has represented the district since 2015. Terry is a tribal member of the Choctaw Nation of Oklahoma and serves as chair of the Tennessee House Health Committee.

== Early life and medical career ==
Terry grew up in the Oklahoma City area and attended school in Moore, Oklahoma. His family operated an auto salvage business, where Terry worked while growing up.

Terry earned a bachelor's degree in psychology from the University of Oklahoma and a medical degree from the University of Oklahoma College of Medicine. He later completed an anesthesiology residency at the University of Tennessee. He subsequently became an anesthesiologist in Murfreesboro, Tennessee.

== Political career ==
=== Elections ===
Terry entered politics after incumbent representative Joe Carr left the 48th district seat in the Tennessee House of Representatives to run for United States Senate in 2014. Terry won the Republican primary against Adam Coggin and Rick Peppers, receiving 2,669 votes to Coggin's 2,215 and Peppers's 2,126.

In the November 2014 general election, Terry defeated Democratic nominee William Bill Campbell, receiving 9,067 votes to Campbell's 4,486. He took office in January 2015.

Terry was reelected in 2016, 2018, 2020, 2022, and 2024.

=== Legislative career ===
During the 2020 legislative session, Terry offered an amendment replacing the language of a proposed abortion bill with provisions based on legislation backed by Governor Bill Lee. The amendment prohibited most abortions after detection of embryonic or fetal cardiac activity and included an exception for medical emergencies.

On April 6, 2023, Terry voted in favor of House Resolution 65, which expelled Democratic representative Justin Jones following Jones's participation in a protest on the House floor after the 2023 Nashville school shooting. The resolution passed 72-25. Terry did not cast a recorded vote on the subsequent resolution concerning Gloria Johnson, which failed 65-30. The House journal records Terry as excused before the final vote on the resolution to expel Justin J. Pearson, which passed 69-26.

In 2025, Terry was the House sponsor of the Medical Ethics Defense Act, enacted as Public Chapter 266. The act establishes a right for healthcare providers to decline to participate in or pay for healthcare services that violate their conscience, as defined by the act. Governor Bill Lee signed the legislation on April 24, 2025.

During the 114th General Assembly, Terry has served as chair of the House Health Committee and as a member of the Calendar and Rules Committee, Insurance Committee, Health Subcommittee, and Population Health Subcommittee.

== Electoral history ==
Year	Republican candidate	Votes	Democratic candidate	Votes
2014	Bryan Terry	9,067	William Bill Campbell	4,486
2016	Bryan Terry	16,381	Justin T. Miller	8,726
2018	Bryan Terry	13,856	Matt Ferry	8,893
2020	Bryan Terry	19,724	Matt Ferry	12,236
2022	Bryan Terry	11,564	Matt Ferry	5,669
2024	Bryan Terry	20,555	Matt Ferry	10,903

Sources: Tennessee Secretary of State and Rutherford County Election Commission.

== Personal life ==
Terry is married to Cheryl Terry and has two children, Brayden and Breeley. He is a tribal member of the Choctaw Nation of Oklahoma.
