= David B. Hawk =

American politician (born 1968)

Member of the Tennessee House of Representatives from the 5th district
- Incumbent
- Assumed office January 14, 2003
- Preceded by: Zane Whitson

Personal details
- Born: June 21, 1968 (age 58)
- Party: Republican
- Spouse: Crystal Goan (div. 2013)
- Children: 2
- Education: Tusculum University; East Tennessee State University
- Website: House website Campaign website

David B. Hawk (born June 21, 1968) is an American politician who has been a member of the Tennessee House of Representatives since 2003. He represents the 5th district, encompassing portions of Greene County. He is a member of the Commerce Committee, the Conservation and Environment Committee, the Parks and Tourism Subcommittee, and the Small Business Subcommittee.

== Early life and education ==
David B. Hawk was born on June 21, 1968, to father Buddy Hawk, a businessman, and mother Jeannette (née Cannon) Hawk, a piano teacher. He attended Tusculum University, graduated from East Tennessee State University with honors and a degree in marketing.

== Career ==
Hawk and his family ran a clothing store, The Tailor Shop.

== Tennessee House of Representatives (2003–present) ==
=== Elections ===
In 2020, after the retirement of Phil Roe, Hawk announced a campaign to represent Tennessee's 1st congressional district in the United States House of Representatives. In the Republican primary, he came in seventh place, receiving five percent of the vote and losing the nomination to Diana Harshbarger.

=== Tenure ===
In 2009, Hawk voted in favor of legislation allowing licensed gun owners to bring concealed weapons into bars, nightclubs, and other establishments that serve alcohol so long as they do not consume alcohol. After Governor Phil Bredesen vetoed the bill, Hawk voted with a supermajority of legislators to override the veto. The measure went into effect on July 14.

On February 9, 2023, Representative Justin Pearson was sworn into the House after winning a special election. Pearson entered the House chamber wearing a dashiki, a traditional West African garment. Afterward, Hawk indirectly criticized Pearson's behavior, taking to the floor to speak about proper attire and recount an anecdote in which he described being blocked from the floor by Lois DeBerry when she noticed him attempt to enter the chamber without a tie.

On April 6, 2023, the Tennessee House voted on motions to expel Pearson, along with Justin Jones and Gloria Johnson, after the three Democratic representatives violated decorum rules while protesting on the House floor after a mass shooting. Hawk voted in favor of all three expulsions. Pearson and Jones were expelled, while Johnson was not.

==== Committee assignments ====
Hawk's committee assignments are below:

- Chair, Transportation Subcommittee
- Vice-Chair, Transportation Committee of 1st Extraordinary Session
- Member, Council on Pensions
- Member, Education Committee of Extraordinary Session
- Member, Finance, Ways, and Means Committee
- Member, Private Acts Committee
- Member, Transportation Committee

== Personal life ==
Hawk married attorney Crystal Goan. They divorced in 2013. He has two daughters, and lives in Greeneville. He is a Lutheran.

=== Arrest and domestic violence accusations ===
On March 18, 2012, Hawk was charged with domestic assault following an altercation with Goan. The sheriff's office report describes that Goan had been drinking the previous night, and that Hawk became angry after looking through her cell phone. According to the report, Goan said that she and Hawk argued through the morning, which culminated in Hawk striking her in the face and knocking her down while she held their eleven-month old child. Following the incident, Goan left to a friend's house and contacted authorities. The criminal complaint against Hawk described Goan had suffered "bruising and swelling on and around her right eye, an abrasion (to) the upper and lower right side of her lip, and a large bruise on her left upper arm."

Hawk was arrested and charged with aggravated assault. The trial began on September 16, 2013. Goan testified that Hawk threw her out of bed before punching her in the face. Hawk denied the claims, and said that Goan had pulled a gun on him and threatened to shoot. On September 19, the jury deadlocked on the assault charge, but found Hawk guilty of reckless endangerment. Hawk has continued to maintain his innocence after the decision. At his sentencing in December, Paul Summers agreed to place Hawk on a two-year judicial diversion probation plan requiring 150 hours of community service and completion of an anger management course. Hawk also was required to pay 1,500 dollars in restitution.

The incident led Hawk to step down as the chair of the House Conservation and Environment Committee. Chip Forrester, chair of the Tennessee Democratic Party, called on Hawk to resign from office altogether.

=== Hit-and-run incident ===
The night of May 10, 2024, Hawk was involved in a minor hit-and-run accident. While exiting a hotel parking lot, Hawk's vehicle collided with the back bumper of another car. The other vehicle's reported the incident to police, and security camera footage revealed Hawk as the suspect. The next day, Hawk went to the police department and said he did not notice hitting the other vehicle, instead thinking that he had run over something underneath his car. The department cited Hawk for leaving the scene of an accident, and he paid 150 dollars as a fine. He later issued a public statement characterizing the incident as a misunderstanding that he sought to rectify as soon as possible.

== Electoral history ==
Electoral history of David Hawk
Year	Office	District	Party	Primary			General			Result	Ref.
Year	Office	District	Party	Total	%	P.	Total	%	P.	Result	Ref.
2000	Tennessee House of Representatives	5	Republican	1,467	36.8%	2nd	—	—	—	Lost primary	
2002	Tennessee House of Representatives	5	Republican	4,536	54.2%	1st	7,399	100.0%	1st	Won	
2004	Tennessee House of Representatives	5	Republican	2,789	100.0%	1st	13,703	67.6%	1st	Won	
2006	Tennessee House of Representatives	5	Republican	6,269	100.0%	1st	12,348	100.0%	1st	Won	
2008	Tennessee House of Representatives	5	Republican	4,302	100.0%	1st	14,353	77.0%	1st	Won	
2010	Tennessee House of Representatives	5	Republican	6,855	100.0%	1st	10,838	84.0%	1st	Won	
2012	Tennessee House of Representatives	5	Republican	3,093	39.8%	1st	11,566	58.2%	1st	Won	
2014	Tennessee House of Representatives	5	Republican	5,935	60.1%	1st	8,396	75.0%	1st	Won	
2016	Tennessee House of Representatives	5	Republican	3,531	100.0%	1st	17,516	100.0%	1st	Won	
2018	Tennessee House of Representatives	5	Republican	8,001	100.0%	1st	14,176	80.6%	1st	Won	
2020	United States House of Representatives	1	Republican	4,717	5.0%	7th	—	—	—	Lost primary	
2020	Tennessee House of Representatives	5	Republican	6,384	100.0%	1st	21,277	100.0%	1st	Won	
2022	Tennessee House of Representatives	5	Republican	3,197	100.0%	1st	14,852	100.0%	1st	Won	
2024	Tennessee House of Representatives	5	Republican	3,580	100.0%	1st	24,547	82.0%	1st	Won	
2026	Tennessee House of Representatives	5	Republican	7,322	100.0%	1st	14,813	76.8%	1st	Won	
