= Tennessee House of Representatives 86th district =

State legislative district in Tennessee

Tennessee's 86th State House of Representatives district
- Map of Tennessee House districts, with the 86th District shaded in red
Representative
Justin J. Pearson; D–Memphis
- Demographics: 26% White; 66% Black; 3% Hispanic; 2% Asian; 0.1% Other; 3% Multiracial
- Population: 67,863

The Tennessee House of Representatives 86th district in the United States is one of 99 legislative districts included in the lower house of the Tennessee General Assembly. The district represents the western part of Shelby County, which includes Downtown Memphis, Beale Street, South Memphis, Benjestown, Northaven, and parts of the city of Millington. The district has been represented by Justin J. Pearson, since April 2023.

== Demographics ==
The Tennessee Comptroller estimated the district's population as of 2024 at 69,193. The district has a notably high poverty rate of 28.1% and lower median incomes than Tennessee, at around three-quarters the median.

- 65.7% of the district is African American
- 25.9% of the district is White
- 3.3% of the district is Hispanic
- 2% of the district is Asian
- 0.1% of the district is some other race alone
- 3% of the district is two or more races

== List of representatives ==
Representative	Party	Years of Service	General Assembly	Residence
Harold Ford Sr.	Democratic	1971–1975	87th-88th	Memphis
Emmit Ford	Democratic	1975–1981	89th-91st	Memphis
Rufus E Jones	Democratic	1981–1997	92nd-99th	Memphis
Barbara Cooper	Democratic	1997–2022	100th-112th	Memphis
Vacant (October 25, 2022 – February 9, 2023)
Justin J. Pearson	Democratic	February 9, 2023 – April 6, 2023	113th*	Memphis
Vacant (April 6–12, 2023)
Justin J. Pearson	Democratic	April 12, 2023–present	113th-114th**	Memphis

*Justin J. Pearson was elected to serve as state representative on January 4, 2023, after Barbara Cooper died in October 2022.

**Pearson was re-appointed by the Shelby County Commission, after being expelled from the house alongside Representative Justin Jones.
