= Tennessee House of Representatives 52nd district =

State legislative district in Tennessee

Tennessee's 52nd State House of Representatives district
- Map of Tennessee House districts with the 52nd District shaded in red
Representative
Justin Jones; D–Nashville
- Demographics: 38.8% White; 32.8% Black; 21.8% Hispanic; 1.8% Asian; 0.1% Hawaiian/Pacific Islander; 0.1% Other; 4.6% Multiracial
- Population (2024): 73,020

The Tennessee House of Representatives 52nd district is one of 99 legislative districts in the Tennessee House of Representatives. The district represents east-central Davidson County. It consists of eastern Nashville neighborhoods centered around Nashville International Airport and Percy Priest Lake. It has been represented by Justin Jones since 2023.

== Demographics ==
The Tennessee Comptroller estimates the population as of 2024 at 76,488.

- 38.8% of the district is White
- 32.8% of the district is African American
- 21.8% of the district is Hispanic
- 1.8% of the district is Asian
- 0.1% of the district is some other race
- 4.6% of the district is Two or more races

Detailed demographic information is also available through Census Reporter.

== List of representatives ==
Representative	Party	Years of service	General Assembly	Residence
Justin Jones	Democratic	2023–present	113th-114th	Nashville
Mike Stewart	Democratic	2009–2022	106th-112th	Nashville
Rob Briley	Democratic	1999-2008	101st-105th	Nashville
Bill Boner	Democratic	1997-1998	100th	Nashville
Bill Purcell	Democratic	1987-1996	95th-99th	Nashville
Bill Covington	Democratic	1979-1986	91st-94th	Nashville
E. Marvin Fleming Sr.	Democratic	1977-1978	90th	Nashville
Bill Boner	Democratic	1975-1976	89th	Nashville
E. Marvin Fleming Sr.	Democratic	1973-1974	88th	Nashville
Bill Boner	Democratic	1971-1972	87th	Nashville

== Electoral history ==
=== 2024 ===
2024 Tennessee House of Representatives election, District 52
Party	Candidate	Votes	%
Democratic	Justin Jones (incumbent)	13,479	69.22
Republican	Laura Nelson	5,995	30.78
Total votes		19,474	100.00

=== 2022 ===
2022 Tennessee House of Representatives election, District 52
Party	Candidate	Votes	%
Democratic	Justin Jones	8,596	94.07
Write-in		542	5.93
Total votes		12,086	100.00

=== 2020 ===
2020 Tennessee House of Representatives election, District 52
Party	Candidate	Votes	%
Democratic	Mike Stewart (incumbent)	16,421	72.02
Republican	Donna Tees	6,382	27.98
Total votes		22,803	100.00
