= Mitchell High School (Tennessee) =

Coordinates: 35°3′25″N 90°5′8″W

Location
- 658 West Mitchell Road; Memphis, Tennessee; United States

Information
- Type: Public secondary
- School district: Memphis-Shelby County Schools
- Principal: Kelvin Meeks
- Grades: 9–12
- Enrollment: 358 (2023–2024)
- Campus: Urban
- Colors: Black; Gold
- Nickname: Tigers
- Website: https://schools.scsk12.org/mitchell-hs

Mitchell High School, also known as Mitchell Road High School, is a public 9–12 school in Memphis, Tennessee, United States, located at 658 West Mitchell Road in South Memphis. The school is served by the Memphis-Shelby County Schools district. As of 2022 the high school's student body was 97 percent black and 1.4 percent hispanic.

== Athletics ==
Mitchell High School plays in TSSAA's west grand division and 9th athletic district as the Tigers and Lady Tigers for baseball, basketball, cross country, football, softball, track and field, and volleyball. Historically, the school used to compete in bowling and golf.

The school has a strong record for both gendered track and field teams. The boys' team has 8 state titles and 7 individual champions, and the girls' team has 3 state titles and 8 individual champions.

Team State Titles
Year	Sport	Class	Award	Details
1983	Girls' Basketball	AAA	Runner-Up	(24-11)
1987	Boys' Basketball	AA	Runner-Up	
1990	Girls' Basketball	AA	Runner-Up	(32-4)
2002	Football	2A	Runner-Up	(12-3)
2005	Girls' Track and Field	A-AA	400 Meter Relay Champions	
2005	Girls' Track and Field	A-AA	800 Meter Relay Champions	
2005	Girls' Track and Field	A-AA	Champions	
2006	Boys' Basketball	AA	Runner-Up	(31-7)
2006	Girls' Track and Field	A-AA	Champions	
2007	Boys' Basketball	AA	Runner-Up	(28-13)
2008	Boys' Basketball	AA	Runner-Up	(25-9)
2008	Football	3A	Runner-Up	(10-5)
2010	Girls' Track and Field	AAA	800 Meter Relay Champions	
2012	Boys' Basketball	AA	Runner-Up	(23-10)
2014	Boys' Basketball	A	Champions	(30-6)
2015	Boys' Basketball	A	Champions	(32-6)
2016	Boys' Basketball	A	Champions	(33-7)

== Notable alumni ==
- Jeremiah Martin – professional basketball player for Śląsk Wrocław (basketball) of the PLK
- Moneybagg Yo – rapper
- Jaylon Moore – NFL player
- Justin J. Pearson – politician and member of the Tennessee House of Representatives
- Andre Turner – NBA player for the Los Angeles Lakers, Boston Celtics, Houston Rockets, Milwaukee Bucks, Los Angeles Clippers, Charlotte Hornets, Philadelphia 76ers, and Washington Bullets
- Thaddeus Young – NBA player for the Toronto Raptors
