= Barbara Cooper (politician) =

American politician (1929–2022)

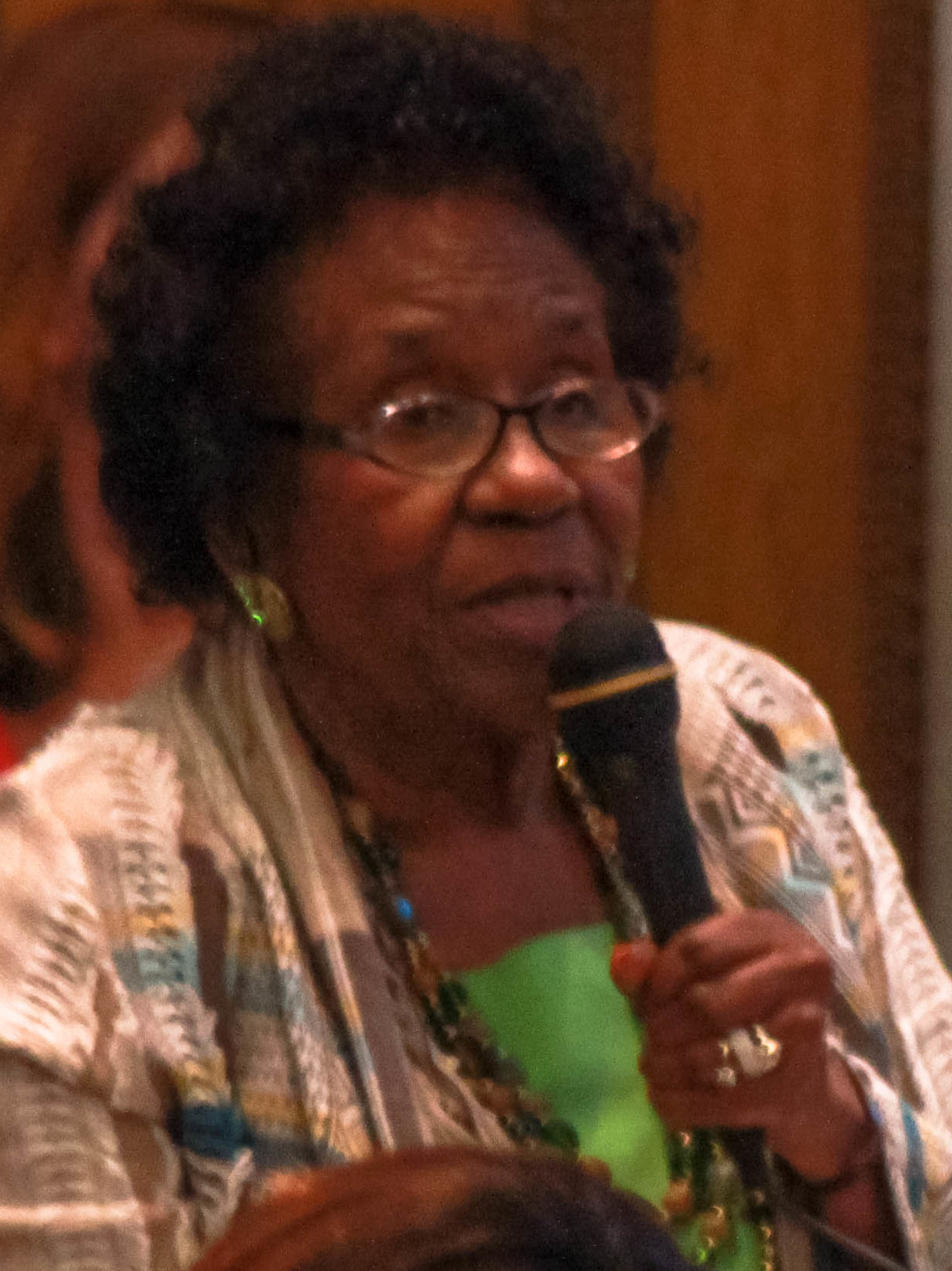
- Cooper in 2014

Member of the Tennessee House of Representatives from the 86th district
- In office January 14, 1997 – October 25, 2022
- Preceded by: Rufus E. Jones
- Succeeded by: Justin J. Pearson

Personal details
- Born: Barbara Lee Ward; August 4, 1929 Memphis, Tennessee, U.S.
- Died: October 25, 2022 (aged 93) Memphis, Tennessee, U.S.
- Party: Democratic
- Spouse: John D. Cooper
- Children: 3
- Education: Tennessee State University (BS, MEd); Jacksonville Theological Seminary (PhD)
- Website: House website

Barbara Lee Cooper (née Ward; August 4, 1929 – October 25, 2022) was an American politician and a Democratic member of the Tennessee House of Representatives for the 86th District.

== Background ==
Cooper was born in the New Chicago neighborhood of North Memphis. She graduated from Manassas High School in Memphis, Tennessee and received a Bachelor of Science degree and a Master's degree in Education from Tennessee State University in Nashville. She was a teacher with Memphis City Schools. She graduated with a Doctorate of Religious Philosophy degree in Christian psychology from Jacksonville Theological Seminary in Jacksonville, Florida in 1999.

Cooper later became involved in Memphis politics serving as the chair of the African-American People's Organization. The AAPO had a convention which helped W. W. Herenton be elected mayor of Memphis, Tennessee in 1991. In 1994, she ran for the Tennessee House of Representatives in the 90th district, and lost to John DeBerry in the Democratic Party's primary election. In 1996, Cooper ran for the 86th district seat in the Tennessee House to succeed Rufus E. Jones, who did not run for reelection. She won the primary in a field of nine candidates.

She was Vice Chair of the House Government Operations Committee and she was on the House Children and Family Affairs Committee, the House Education Committee, the House Family Justice Subcommittee, and the House Higher Education Subcommittee. On November 8, 2022, Cooper posthumously won re-election in the 86th electoral district, with 74% of the vote over an independent candidate. On January 24, 2023, the special election primary to complete her term was won by Democrat Justin J. Pearson, with 52.4% of the vote over nine other candidates.

== Personal life and death ==
In 1951, she married John D. Cooper, one of the first black firefighters in the Memphis Fire Department; they had three children. John D. Cooper died in 2006. Barbara was a Catholic who attended St. Augustine Catholic Church. She died on October 25, 2022, at age 93.
