= Mike Stewart (politician) =

American politician (born 1965)

Michael G. Stewart
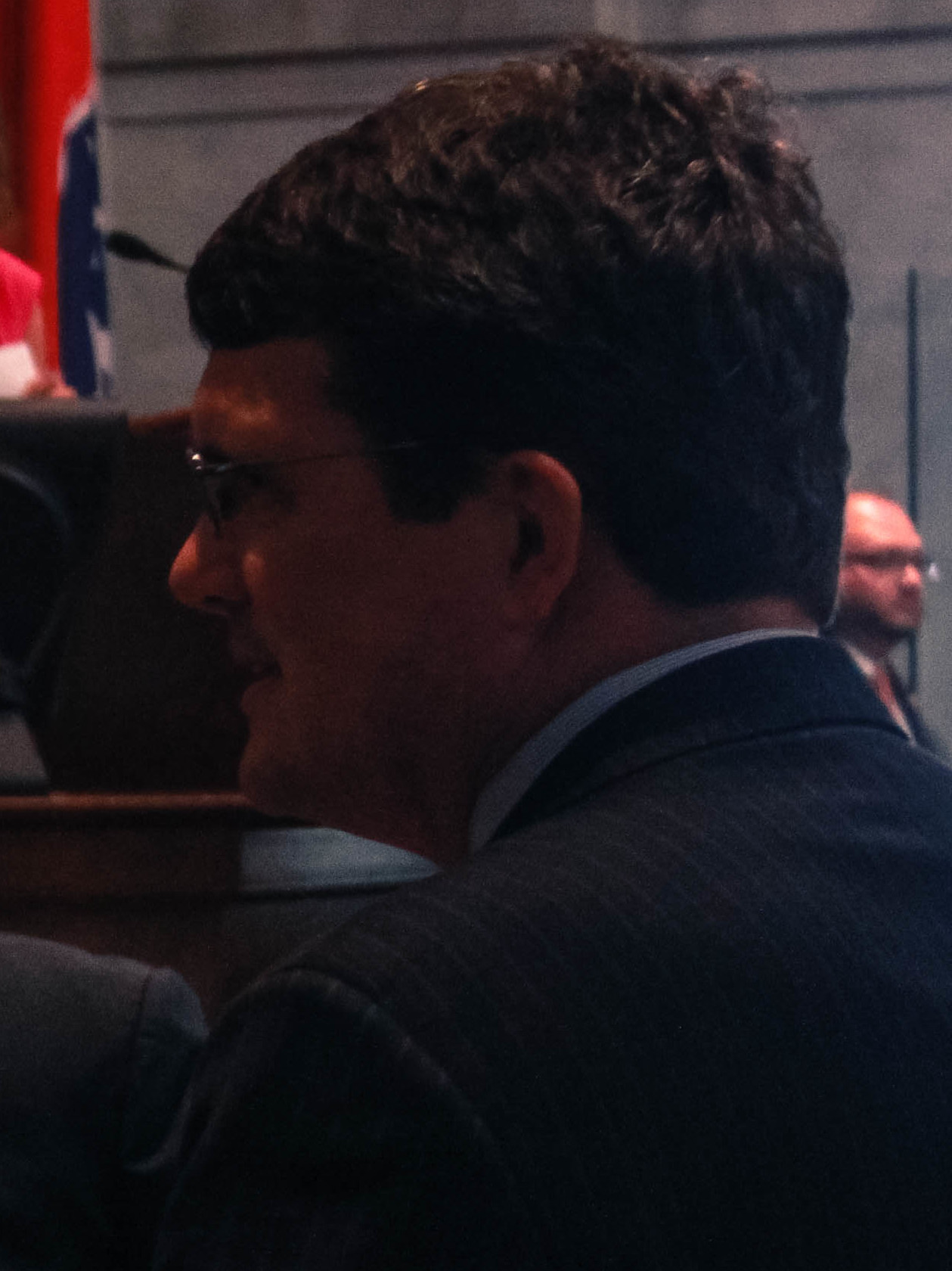

Member of the Tennessee House of Representatives from the 52nd district
- In office January 13, 2009 – January 10, 2023
- Preceded by: Rob Briley
- Succeeded by: Justin Jones

Personal details
- Born: January 30, 1965 (age 61) Oak Ridge, Tennessee, U.S.
- Party: Democratic
- Spouse: Ruth
- Education: University of Pennsylvania; University of Tennessee College of Law
- Occupation: Attorney

Mike Stewart (born January 30, 1965) is an American politician from the state of Tennessee. He was a Democratic member of the Tennessee House of Representatives, representing the 52nd district. Stewart was the chair of the Tennessee House Democratic Caucus.

== Personal history ==
Before his election to the House, Stewart served in the Army, first in Korea, where he was awarded the Eighth Army Distinguished Leader Award, and later in Operation Desert Storm. Following Desert Storm, Stewart attended the University of Tennessee Law School, where he graduated cum laude in 1994. Stewart and his wife Ruth then moved to the East Nashville neighborhood of Lockeland Springs in order for Stewart to begin his legal career; he later practiced law at the Nashville law firm Waller Lansden Dortch & Davis, LLP before pursuing a career in politics. Stewart was elected President of the Lockeland Springs Neighborhood Association in 1998.

== Career in the House ==
First elected to the State House in 2008 to represent District 52, Stewart has served on the Criminal Justice, Ethics, Government Operations, and Rules Committees, and he made headlines when he brought an AR-15 style rifle, which he had legally purchased without a background check, into a committee meeting to make a statement about gun control.

He was the only legislator in the Tennessee House to vote against a bill that loosened restrictions on high-interest payday lenders in Tennessee.
