= Andrew Farmer (politician) =

American politician (born 1979)

Member of the Tennessee House of Representatives from the 17th district
- Incumbent
- Assumed office January 8, 2013
- Preceded by: Frank S. Niceley

Personal details
- Born: Andrew Ellis Farmer; December 14, 1979 (age 46)
- Party: Republican
- Spouse: Mariah
- Children: 2
- Education: East Tennessee State University (BBA); Thomas M. Cooley Law School (JD)
- Website: House website

Andrew Ellis Farmer (born December 14, 1979) is an American politician and a Republican member of the Tennessee House of Representatives representing the 17th district since January 8, 2013.

== Early life and education ==
Andrew Ellis Farmer was born on December 14, 1979. He earned his BBA from East Tennessee State University and his JD from Thomas M. Cooley Law School.

== Tenure ==
In 2023, Farmer supported motions to remove three sitting Democratic representatives — Gloria Johnson, Justin Jones, and Justin J. Pearson — for "knowingly and intentionally bring[ing] disorder and dishonor" and "generally engag[ing] in disorderly and disruptive conduct", which resulted in the proceedings being shut down. Protesters were at the capitol voicing their outrage over a school shooting in Nashville that left six dead.

The resolution to remove Jones, HR 65, was sponsored by Bud Hulsey and co-sponsored by Gino Bulso, Farmer, and Johnny Garrett; it passed with a vote of 72–25. He was also the sponsor of HR 63, the resolution to remove Pearson.

== Elections ==
- 2012 Farmer challenged District 17 incumbent Representative Frank S. Niceley in the three-way August 2, 2012 Republican Primary, winning with 2,980 votes (52.1%), and won the November 6, 2012 General election with 14,244 votes (76.1%) against Democratic nominee Mike Dockery, who had run for the seat in 2010.
