= Rob Briley =

American politician

Member of the Tennessee House of Representatives from the 52nd district
- In office 1999–2008
- Succeeded by: Michael G. Stewart

Personal details
- Born: October 1, 1966 (age 60)
- Party: Democratic
- Education: University of Colorado Boulder; Vanderbilt Law School

Rob Briley (born October 15, 1966, in Nashville, Tennessee, United States) is an American politician and a Democratic former member of the Tennessee House of Representatives for the 52nd district, which is part of Davidson County. He is the brother of Nashville politician David Briley and the grandson of Beverly Briley, Metro-Nashville's first mayor.

== Education and career ==
Briley graduated with a Bachelor of Science degree in political science from the University of Colorado Boulder in 1991, and obtained his J.D. and from Vanderbilt Law School in 1997.

Briley was elected as a Tennessee state representative beginning with the 101st Tennessee General Assembly (1999–2000). During his 5 term tenure was a member of the House Ethics, Finance, Ways and Means Committee, Rules, Calendar and Rules, and Joint Workers Compensation Committees, and of the House Civil Practice and Procedure, and Criminal Practice and Procedure Subcommittees. He was chair of the Judiciary Committee at the time of his resigning his position as a representative in 2008.

Briley currently works as an attorney. His wife filed for divorce due to his infidelity.

== Legislative positions ==
Briley voted against a bill that would have allowed Tennesseans with gun carrying permits to take their firearms into recreational facilities like state and local parks and playgrounds. He stated that a House bill that would have allowed citizens to carry guns in establishments that serve alcohol was a ploy by Republicans to get Democrats to vote against gun rights. He also stated that the bill shouldn't have been allowed to have been brought up because it was voted down in the same committee the previous year.

Briley came out against a bill that makes it easier for men to end child support payments for children if paternity tests prove the children do not belong to the men. In the floor debate, Briley said "Yet you want to punish a child as the result of an adulterous situation," said Briley. "You put the child in the position of bearing the burden of a parent's conduct."

== Drunk driving incident ==
Briley allegedly rammed the rear of a truck in Dowelltown, Tennessee on September 8, 2007, after which state troopers cited him for driving under the influence, evading arrest, and violating the implied consent law. The charges arose as a result of his allegedly having tried to escape the officers who pulled him over in Wilson County, starting a chase that, according to Watertown police, topped speeds of over 100 miles per hour (161 km/h). Briley was charged with drunk driving and leaving the scene of the two accidents after Watertown police stopped his vehicle.

During the incident, Briley asked police officers twice, to shoot him in the "fucking head," and he called the Wilson County Sheriff's Department deputies "goddamn Nazis." To one deputy, he said, "You're not an American, are you? You're a goddamn German!" Inside his car, police found a bottle of bourbon and three bottles of pills. Democratic leaders said that he would keep his legislative seat and Judiciary Committee chairmanship for now, though Governor Phil Bredesen said he should step down from his post as chair of the Judiciary Committee. On September 15, 2007, he resigned from his position as chair of the Judiciary Committee. He stated he was being treated at Cumberland Heights alcohol and drug treatment center.

On March 4, 2008, Briley announced that he would not seek re-election to his seat in the state House.

Following these events, Briley admitted that he is an alcoholic during a speech on the floor of the House of Representatives.
