= Charlie Baum =

American politician (born 1972)

Member of the Tennessee House of Representatives from the 37th district
- Incumbent
- Assumed office January 8, 2019
- Preceded by: Dawn White

Personal details
- Born: December 13, 1972 (age 53)
- Party: Republican
- Spouse: Kelly Baum
- Children: 3
- Education: Wake Forest University (BA); University of North Carolina (PhD)

Charlie Baum (born December 13, 1972) is an American politician and a Republican member of the Tennessee House of Representatives, representing the 37th district, encompassing parts of Murfreesboro, since 2019. Baum is also a professor of economics at Middle Tennessee State University.

In 2023, Baum was the only Republican to vote against three resolutions to expel three Democratic lawmakers from the legislature for violating decorum rules. The two successful expulsions were widely characterized as unprecedented. Baum told the Tennessean he wanted to keep working with the three lawmakers to "become more effective legislators" and said that "the vast majority of [my constituents] didn't want these representatives expelled".

== Background ==
=== Education ===
Baum attended Wake Forest University in Winston-Salem, North Carolina where he earned his B.A. in economics in 1995. Baum then attended the University of North Carolina Chapel Hill, where he received his Ph.D. in economics in 1999.

=== Teaching career ===
Baum currently teaches economics at Middle Tennessee State University in Murfreesboro. He has taught at MTSU since August 1999.

=== Personal life ===
Baum was raised in Knoxville, Tennessee. He is married to his wife Kelly and they have 3 children: Elizabeth, Anna Jane, and Charles. Baum and his family are active members of the First United Methodist Church in Murfreesboro.

== Electoral history ==
=== 2018 election ===
==== Primary election results ====
The District 37 Republican Primary Election took place on August 2, 2018.

Candidate	Percentage of Votes	Total Votes Received
Charlie Baum	100%	5,831 Votes

==== General election results ====
The District 37 General Election took place on November 6, 2018.

Candidate	Percentage of Votes	Total Votes Received
Charlie Baum (R)	59.3%	13,455 Votes
Deanna Debow Osborne (D)	40.7%	9,218 Votes

=== 2022 election ===
==== Republican Primary ====
Republican primary
Party	Candidate	Votes	%
Republican	Charlie Baum (incumbent)	3,658	100.00%
Total votes		3,658	100.00%

==== General election ====
Tennessee House of Representatives District 37 general election, 2022
Party	Candidate	Votes	%
Republican	Charlie Baum (incumbent)	9,456	65.44%
Democratic	Bill Levine	4,993	34.56%
Total votes		14,449	100.00%
Republican hold			

== Current legislative committees ==
Role	Committee
Member	Finance, Ways, & Means Committee
Member	Finance, Ways, & Means Appropriations Committee
Member	Education
Member	Consumer & Human Resources Committee
Member	Employee Affairs Subcommittee

== Community involvement ==
=== Volunteer work ===
Baum was a board member for 4 years at the United Way of Rutherford and Cannon Counties from 2013–2017. He was a board member at the American Heart Association of Rutherford County for 5 years from 2012–2017. He was a county commissioner at the Rutherford County Commission for 8 years from 2010–2018. He was a board member on the Murfreesboro City School Foundation for 6 years from 2013–2019. He is currently a board member on the Linebaugh Library Foundation Board, where he has served since 2015. Baum is currently a board member at Oaklands Historic Mansion, where he has served since 2016.

=== Organizations ===
Baum has been a part of the American Academy of Economics and Financial Experts (AAEFE) since 2015. He has been a part of National Association of Forensic Economists since January 2013.

== Published work ==
Baum published "Calculating Economic Losses from Wrongful Incarceration" in the Tennessee Bar Journal in July 2016. Baum published "Employee Tenure and Economic Losses in Wrongful Termination Cases" in the Journal of Forensic Economics in 2013.

== Honors and awards ==
In 1988, Baum became an Eagle Scout, as a part of the Boy Scouts of America. From 2008–2014, Baum served as a chair in the Department of Economics and Finance at MTSU.
