= Tennessee House of Representatives 17th district =

State legislative district in Tennessee

Tennessee's 17th State House of Representatives district
- Map of Tennessee House districts with the 17th District shaded in red
Representative
Andrew Farmer; R–Sevierville
since 2013
- Demographics: 89.1% White; 1% Black; 5.5% Hispanic; 1% Asian; 2.8% Multiracial
- Population (2024): 70,685

The Tennessee House of Representatives 17th district is one of the 99 legislative districts in the lower house of the Tennessee General Assembly. The district is located in East Tennessee and covers parts of Jefferson and Sevier counties. The district includes outlying areas in the northern Sevierville area such as Catlettsburg and Kodak. It also includes New Market, parts of Jefferson City, as well as Dandridge. Much of rest of the district is unincorporated and mostly rural. There are also many resorts and campgrounds around Douglas Lake. Andrew Farmer has represented the district since 2013.

== Demographics ==
The Tennessee Comptroller estimates the population as of 2024 at 70,685.

- 89.1% of the district is White
- 5.5% of the district is Hispanic
- 1% of the district is Black
- 1% of the district is Asian
- 2.8% of the district is Two or more races

Detailed demographic information is also available through Census Reporter.

== History ==
Before the 88th General Assembly, there were many districts in Knox County, what would become the 17th district was associated with the 5th district in Knox County. The 88th Tennessee General Assembly was the first in which all districts were numbered. At this time, the 17th district was in Knox County. At the 93rd GA, it was part of Blount and Knox counties. From the 94th-102nd GAs, it was part of Knox County again. From the 103rd-107th GAs, it was composed of parts of Jefferson and Knox counties. Since the 108th General Assembly, it has been composed of parts of Jefferson and Sevier counties.

== List of Representatives ==
Representative	Party	Years of Service	General Assembly	Hometown
Andrew Farmer	Republican	2013-present	108th-114th	Sevierville
Frank S. Niceley	Republican	2005-2012	104th-107th	Knoxville
Jamie Hagood	Republican	1999-2004	101st-103rd	Knoxville
Wayne A. Ritchie	Democratic	1993-1998	98th-100th	Knoxville
Ray Hill	Republican	1991-1992	97th	Sevierville
Paul C. Scruggs	Republican	1979-1990	91st-96th	Knoxville
Tom Jensen	Republican	1967-1978	85th-90th	Knoxville
