= 2023 Tennessee House of Representatives expulsions =

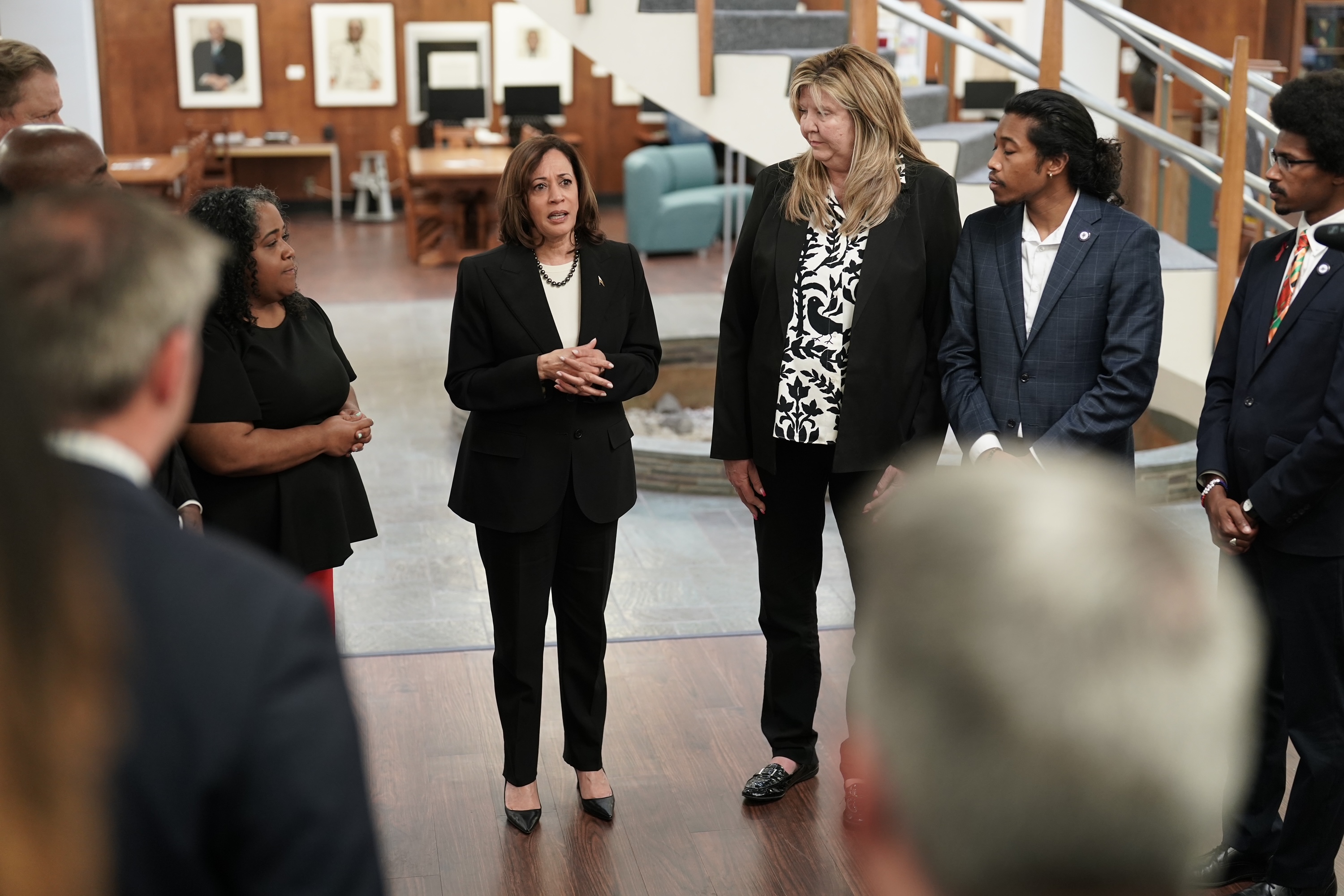
Gloria Johnson, Justin Jones, and Justin J. Pearson (right) pictured with Vice President Kamala Harris (center) on April 7, 2023.

On April 6, 2023, the Tennessee House of Representatives voted on resolutions to expel Democratic Representatives Gloria Johnson, Justin Jones, and Justin J. Pearson for violating the chamber's decorum rules by leading personal protests for gun reform on the House floor and joining demonstrators in the chamber's public galleries during a legislative session three days after the 2023 Nashville school shooting. Resolutions for the expulsions of Jones and Pearson passed with a two-thirds majority, and they were removed from office. The resolution against Johnson failed to pass by one vote.

The decision to expel the representatives has been called unprecedented in modern United States history, with the power to expel members typically being reserved to remove members accused of serious misconduct. The decision was condemned as authoritarian and undemocratic by a number of Democrats, including President Joe Biden, former president Barack Obama, and former vice president Al Gore, who served as a U.S. Senator from Tennessee from 1985 to 1993. Jones, Johnson, and Pearson were dubbed by their supporters as the "Tennessee Three."

The Nashville Metropolitan Council voted unanimously to reinstate Jones on April 10, and two days later the Shelby County Board of Commissioners voted unanimously to reinstate Pearson. Both legislators won their respective special elections to serve the remainder of their terms.

== Background ==
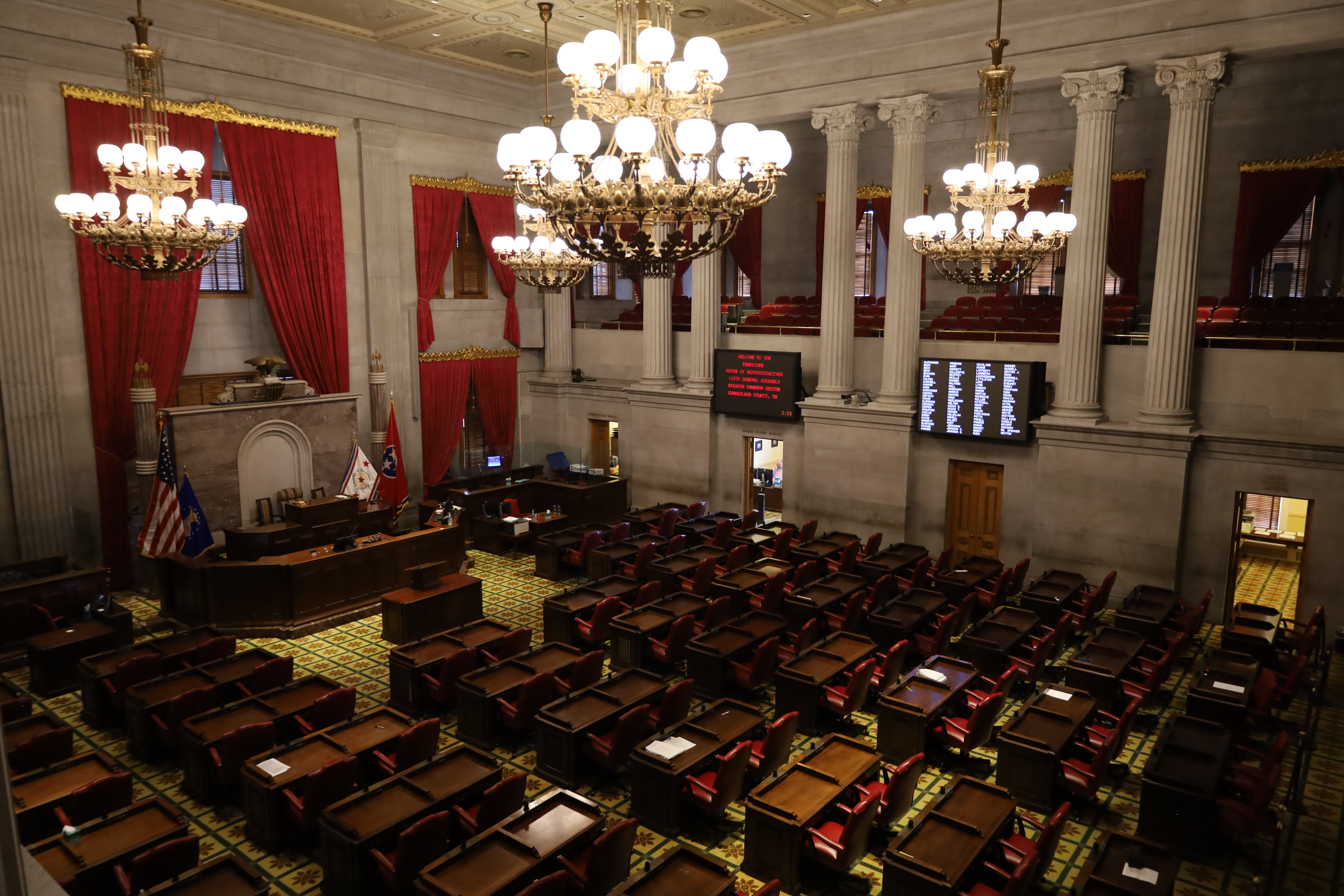
The House of Representatives Chamber in the Tennessee State Capitol, pictured in 2022

=== Tennessee House of Representatives ===
The Tennessee House of Representatives requires a two-thirds majority of the total membership to expel another representative. In the state of Tennessee, expulsions are rare; since the Civil War, only eight representatives had been expelled before 2023. Six democratic and unionist representatives were expelled in 1866 for trying to prevent passage of the 14th Amendment, which granted citizenship to former slaves. In 1980, Republican representative Robert Fisher was expelled for bribery. Republican representative Jeremy Durham was expelled in 2016 for sexual misconduct.

=== Covenant School shooting and protest ===
External videos
- Video of the disturbance by Justin Jones, Gloria Johnson, and Justin J. Pearson of a session of the Tennessee House of Representatives.

On March 27, 2023, a shooter killed three students and three adults at the Covenant School, a Presbyterian private school in Nashville. On March 30, hundreds of protesters, joined by state representatives Jones, Johnson, and Pearson, marched onto the Tennessee State Capitol to call on lawmakers to address gun reform.

Jones, Johnson, and Pearson gathered at the well of the chamber and chanted, "No action, no peace" during a proceeding that day, using a bullhorn. The bullhorn was believed to be owned by country singer Margo Price, but Price later clarified that it was not hers. The Speaker of the Tennessee House of Representatives, Cameron Sexton, condemned the protest, and compared it to the January 6 Capitol attack. Sexton revoked their ID card access to the State Capitol on April 3 and stripped them of their committee assignments.

In the days following the demonstration, supporters of Jones, Johnson, and Pearson accused Republican legislators of fascism. During her interview with Mother Jones, Johnson stated that she believed Tennessee was less democratic than North Korea. On social media, the hashtag #TennesseeThree trended on Twitter as supporters of the legislators protested the expulsion votes.

== Expulsion votes ==
As the Tennessee House of Representatives is a 99-seat body, the number of votes to expel a member is 66 in order to reach the required supermajority.

=== Justin Jones ===
Vote on expelling Justin Jones. Democrat voted against expulsion Republican voted for expulsion Republican voted against expulsion Republican didn't vote

The Tennessee House of Representatives voted to expel Jones by a vote of 72–25, split along party lines, with only one Republican, Charlie Baum, voting against the expulsion. HR 65, the resolution to remove Jones, was sponsored by Bud Hulsey and co-sponsored by Gino Bulso, Andrew Farmer, and Johnny Garrett.

HR 65 - Expels Representative Justin Jones from the House of Representatives of the 113th General Assembly.
Choice	Votes	%
✓ Yes	72	74.23
Against	25	25.77
Required majority		66.67
Total	97	100.00
Valid votes	97	97.98
Invalid/blank votes	2	2.02
Total votes	99	100.00

=== Gloria Johnson ===
Vote on expelling Gloria Johnson. Democrat voted against expulsion Republican voted for expulsion Republican voted against expulsion Republican didn't vote Vacant

The Tennessee House of Representatives voted 65–30 not to expel Johnson. It was short of the required two-thirds majority by one vote. Seven Republicans voted against the resolution: Jody Barrett, Charlie Baum, Rush Bricken, Bryan Richey, Lowell Russell, Mike Sparks, and Sam Whitson. The resolution, HR 64, was sponsored by Gino Bulso.

HR 64 - Expels Representative Gloria Johnson from the House of Representatives of the 113th General Assembly
Choice	Votes	%
For	65	68.42
✗ No	30	31.58
Required majority		66.67
Total	95	100.00
Valid votes	95	95.96
Invalid/blank votes	4	4.04
Total votes	99	100.00

=== Justin J. Pearson ===
Vote on expelling Justin J. Pearson. Democrat voted against expulsion Republican voted for expulsion Republican voted against expulsion Republican didn't vote Vacant

The Tennessee House of Representatives voted to expel Pearson, 69–26. HR 63, the resolution to remove Pearson, was sponsored by Andrew Farmer. Charlie Baum, Bryan Richey, and John Gillespie were the three Republicans to vote against the resolution.

HR 63 - Expels Representative Justin J. Pearson from the House of Representatives of the 113th General Assembly.
Choice	Votes	%
✓ Yes	69	72.63
Against	26	27.37
Required majority		66.67
Total	95	100.00
Valid votes	95	95.96
Invalid/blank votes	4	4.04
Total votes	99	100.00

== Post-expulsions ==
=== Succession ===
The expulsions of Jones and Pearson left vacancies in House Districts 52 and 86. Article 2, Section 15 of the Tennessee State Constitution allows the local legislative body—in this case, the Metropolitan Council of Nashville and Davidson County and the Shelby County Board of Commissioners, respectively—to appoint an interim successor until a special election can be held. At least 29 members of the 40-member Davidson County Metropolitan Council initially vowed to reappoint Jones; the measure required a majority of members to approve it. Shelby county commissioner Erika Sugarmon claimed that commissioners were threatened with cuts in state funding for certain local projects during budget negotiations if Pearson were re-seated, which was disputed by a spokesperson for the House Speaker. The Democratic city and Republican legislature were already at odds due to widening political differences. During the 2022 redistricting cycle, the state legislature gerrymandered Nashville into three safe Republican seats from a safe Democratic district. Further turmoil erupted when the Nashville metro council rejected a bid to host the 2024 Republican National Convention in August 2022, drawing the ire of many GOP lawmakers. A slate of bills targeting Nashville were introduced during the 2023 session prior to the expulsions that would abruptly cut the size of the Nashville metro council in half, and take over the city's airport authority and sports authority, and cut convention center funding, among others.

The Metropolitan Council of Nashville and Davidson County set a meeting to discuss an interim appointment to the vacant District 52 on April 10. Jones was reinstated to his seat by a unanimous vote of 36–0. The Shelby County Board of Commissioners unanimously voted 7–0 to reinstate Pearson to his seat on April 12; six of the 13 board members were not present for the vote.

Jones and Pearson both won special elections on August 4 to reclaim their seats.

== Protests ==
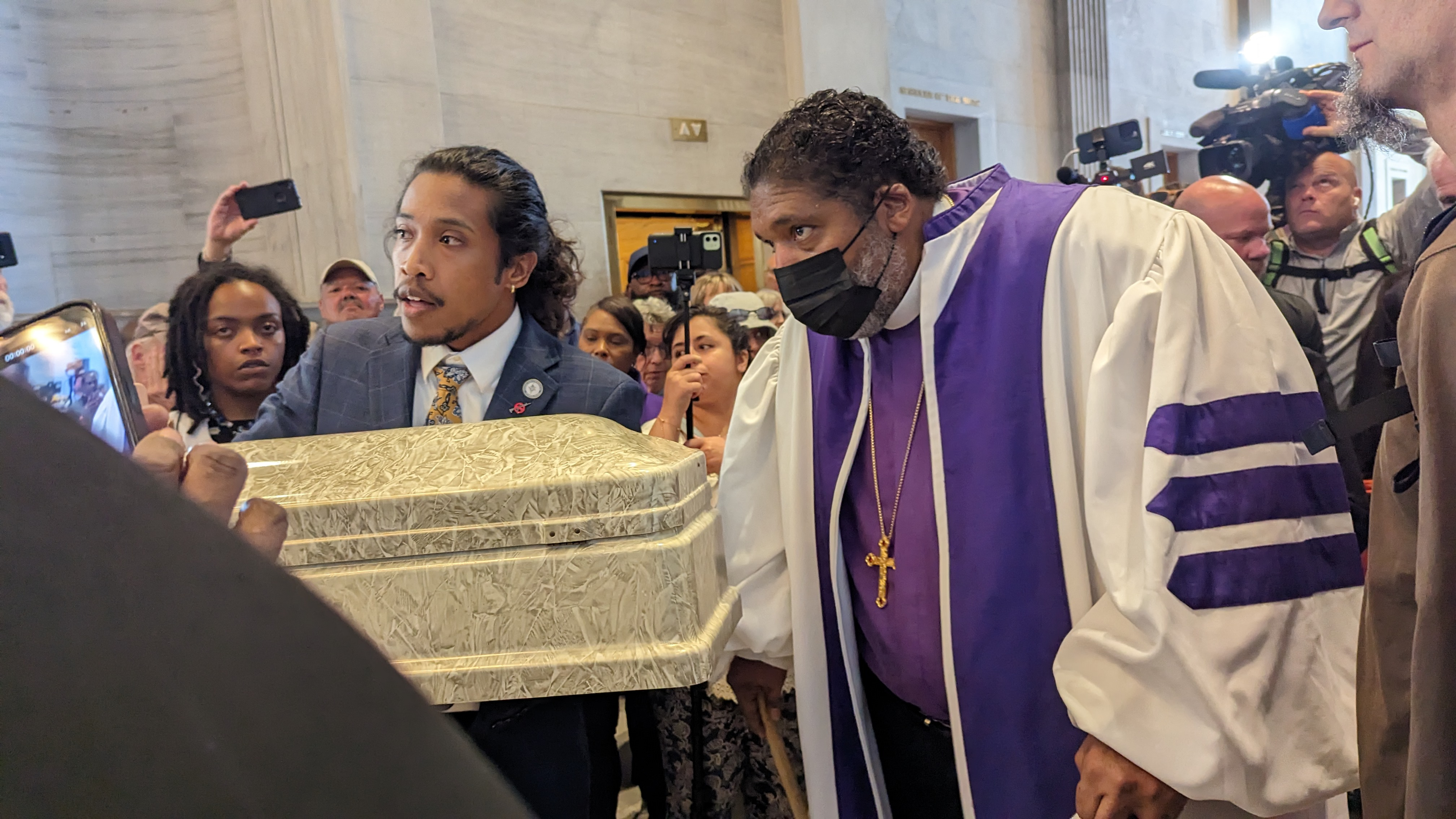
Justin Jones and William Barber II attempt to bring a coffin onto the floor of the Tennessee state legislature in protest against gun violence on April 17, 2023.

On April 6, protesters gathered in the Tennessee State Capitol to protest the expulsions and reaffirm their support for gun reform legislation.

On April 17, William Barber II led a Moral Monday protest of gun violence at the State Capitol. Over 1,000 people attended a rally and march from McKendree Methodist Church to Legislative Plaza. At the conclusion of the march, the recently reinstated Representative Justin Jones, flanked by Barber and other faith leaders, attempted to bring a child's coffin on the floor of the legislative session, but was blocked by police.

== Reactions ==
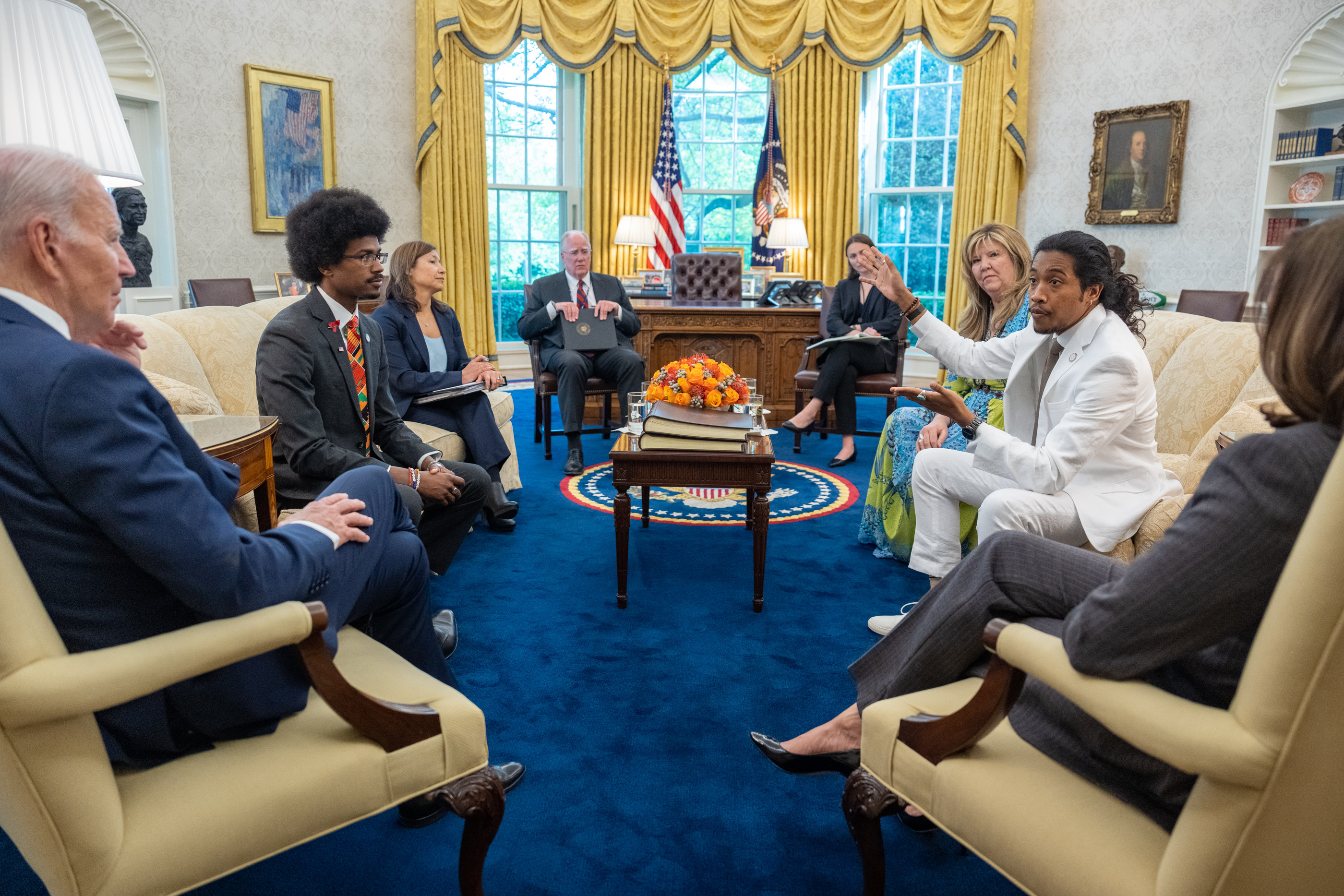
Jones, Johnson, and Pearson speak with President Biden and Vice President Harris, at the White House on April 24, 2023.

Following Jones' expulsion, President Joe Biden wrote that the move was "shocking, undemocratic, and without precedent." Vice President Kamala Harris, who was on her way to speak in Dalton, Georgia, made a surprise visit to Tennessee on April 7 to meet with the three legislators and reaffirm President Biden's support for an assault weapons ban.

Former President Barack Obama wrote, "This nation was built on peaceful protest. No elected official should lose their job simply for raising their voice – especially when they're doing it on behalf of our children." Former Vice President Al Gore wrote that the expulsions resulted in a "historically sad day for democracy in Tennessee." Gore served as a U.S. representative from Tennessee from 1977 to 1985, and as a U.S. senator from 1985 to 1993.

State Representative Joe Towns Jr. criticized the expulsion saying "you never use a sledgehammer to kill a gnat; we are dropping the nuclear option."

Former U.S. Representative Adam Kinzinger, an Illinois Republican, was also critical of the expulsions. "The GOP kicked out legislators for protesting guns. Not censure, fine etc. expelled. This is facist [sic] in nature," Kinzinger tweeted.

Conservative political commentator Matt Walsh supported the expulsions. "The Democrats led a mob into the capitol building and then tried to use the floor of the House as a staging ground for a political demonstration. They never imagined that Republicans would actually use their constitutional authority to expel them. But they did. Awesome stuff," Walsh tweeted.

Tennessee State Senator London Lamar accused the Tennessee House of racism for expelling two black representatives but not the white representative, and the three representatives involved commented on the expulsions. Johnson, a white woman, was asked why she thought she was not expelled, to which she responded, "It might have to do with the color of my skin." Pearson said of his expulsion: "You cannot ignore the racial dynamic of what happened today — two young black lawmakers get expelled and the one white woman does not," while Jones described it as "a farce of democracy."

State Representative Charlie Baum was the only Republican to vote against all three proposed expulsions, stating that he "[knew his] constituents, the vast majority of them didn't want these representatives expelled."

== See also ==
- Disciplinary procedure
- Parliamentary procedure
- Zooey Zephyr, Montana Democratic legislator who faced similar reprisal in the same year
