= Robert Fisher (Tennessee politician) =

American politician (1925–1989)

Member of the Tennessee House of Representatives from the 4th district
- In office 1975 – January 14, 1980
- Preceded by: Albert E. Miller Sr.
- Succeeded by: Frank "Bob" Percy

Personal details
- Born: June 3, 1925 Johnson City, Tennessee, U.S.
- Died: February 11, 1989 (aged 63) Mountain Home, Tennessee, U.S.
- Party: Republican
- Children: 3
- Profession: Veterans Service Officer

Robert Joseph Fisher (June 3, 1925 – February 11, 1989) was an American politician in the state of Tennessee. He served in the Tennessee House of Representatives from 1975 to 1980, sitting as a Republican.

In 1980, he was convicted of soliciting a $1,000 bribe from Carter County Sheriff George Papantoniou to kill a state bill the sheriff opposed. Fisher was fined $500 and received a 30 day suspended sentence, being expelled from the state legislature by a vote of 92–1. He was the first legislator in Tennessee to be expelled since 1866.

Fisher died in Mountain Home, Tennessee on February 11, 1989, at the age of 63.
