= Justin J. Pearson =

American politician (born 1995)

Justin Pearson
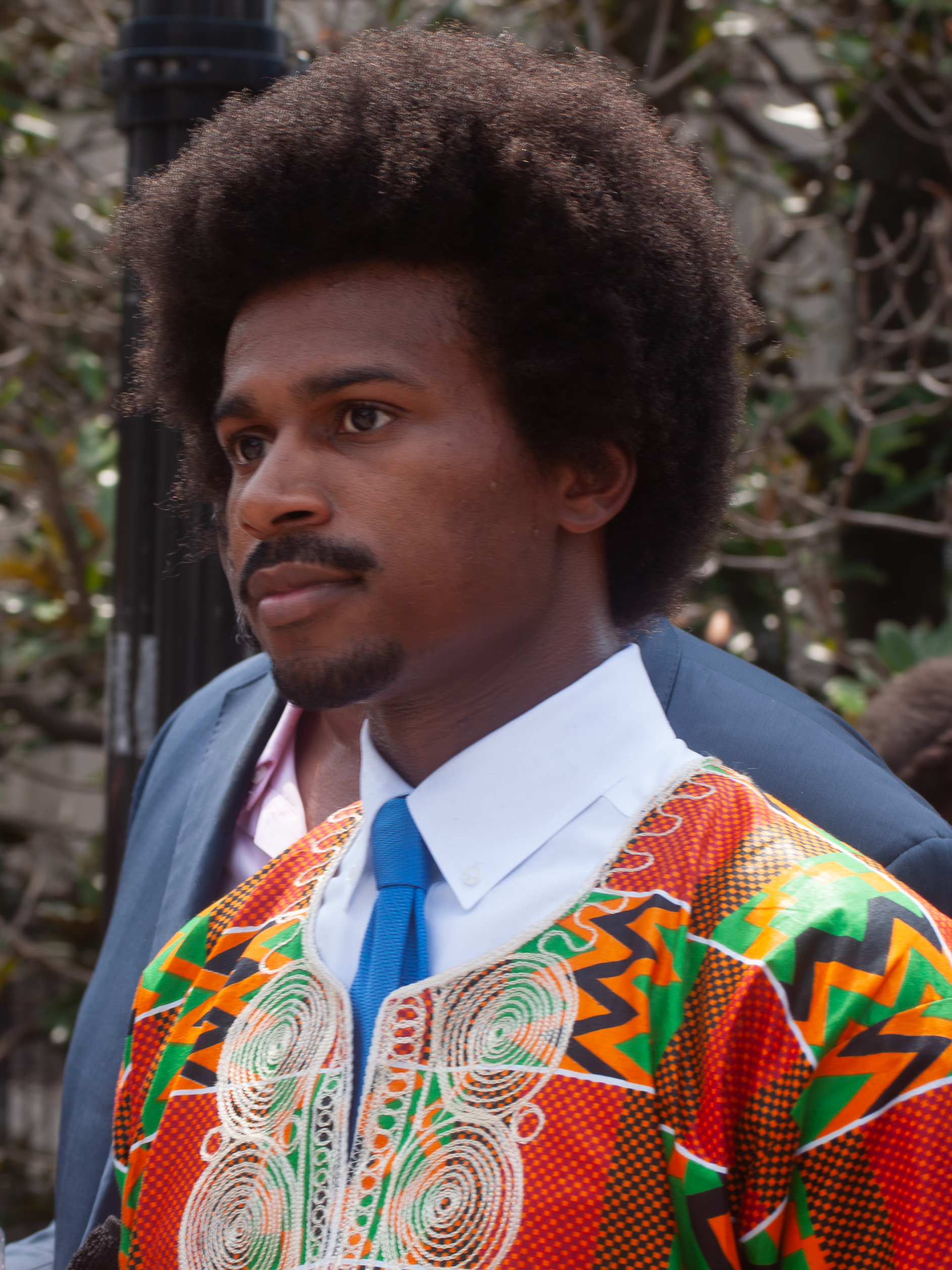
- Pearson in 2023

Member of the Tennessee House of Representatives from the 86th district
- Incumbent
- Assumed office April 12, 2023
- In office February 9, 2023 – April 6, 2023
- Preceded by: Barbara Cooper

Personal details
- Born: Justin Jamal Pearson; January 7, 1995 (age 31) Memphis, Tennessee, U.S.
- Party: Democratic
- Spouse: Oceana Gilliam (m. 2025)
- Education: Bowdoin College (BA)
- Website: House website Campaign website

Justin Jamal Pearson (Note: Pronunciation: PEER-sun) (born January 7, 1995) is an American activist and politician. He is a member of the Tennessee House of Representatives representing the 86th district, covering parts of the city of Memphis. He was elected in a January 2023 special election to succeed Barbara Cooper, who was posthumously re-elected in the November 2022 Tennessee House of Representatives election after dying in October 2022. When he was sworn into office at the age of 28, Pearson became the third youngest lawmaker serving in the Tennessee House of Representatives.

He and fellow state representative Justin Jones were expelled in April 2023, for violating decorum rules by participating in a gun control protest on the House floor. He was reappointed by a unanimous vote of the members present at the Shelby County Board of Commissioners.

Pearson ran as the Democratic candidate for Tennessee's 9th congressional district in 2026, narrowly losing to Republican Brent Taylor. (Note: Attributed to multiple references:)

== Early life and education ==
Pearson was born in Memphis, Tennessee. His father, Jason Pearson, was a preacher and his mother, Dr. Kimberly Owens-Pearson, a teacher. When he was 11 years old, his family moved to the Washington, D.C. area while his father pursued a master's degree at Howard University. Four years later, the family returned to Memphis, where Justin was shocked by the contrast between his previous high school in Centreville, Virginia, and his new school, which was conspicuously underfunded. At Mitchell High School in inner-city Memphis, Pearson became active in student government, lobbied for textbooks and Advanced Placement classes, and joined the debate team. He graduated as valedictorian of his high school class.

In 2017, Pearson graduated from Bowdoin College in Brunswick, Maine, majoring in Government & Legal Studies with a minor in Education Studies. While at Bowdoin, he was a Mellon Mays fellow and was accepted to the summer public policy institute at the Princeton School of Public and International Affairs.

== Environmental activism ==
In 2020, Pearson co-founded the environmental advocacy group Memphis Community Against Pollution (originally Memphis Community Against the Pipeline), with Kathy Robinson and Kizzy Jones, one of two local groups that joined in a successful effort to cancel construction of the Byhalia Pipeline. A portion of the 49-mile-long (79 km) pipeline would pass through poor black neighborhoods in south Memphis, as well as over the Memphis sand aquifer, which provides water to residents in the Memphis area. Justin Timberlake and former Vice President Al Gore joined Pearson's cause, successfully aiding in stopping the pipeline.

== Tennessee House of Representatives ==
=== Elections ===
==== March 2023 special election ====
Pearson ran in the January 24, 2023, Democratic primary for a special election to succeed Barbara Cooper in the Tennessee House of Representatives. Cooper died on October 25, 2022; in November 2022, she was posthumously re-elected with 74% of the vote. Because no Republicans or independents filed to run for the seat, the primary victor was ensured victory in the special general election. Pearson won the ten-person primary with 52.3% of the vote. The next day, he was unanimously appointed and sworn into the vacant office by the Memphis City Council as the interim representative prior to the uncontested March 24, 2023, special general election. Pearson became the second youngest lawmaker currently serving in the Tennessee House of Representatives.

Following the killing of Tyre Nichols, a black photographer assaulted by Memphis police during a January 2023 traffic stop, Pearson stated that he intended to introduce a bill to prevent police officers with criminal records from transferring across departments. He blamed inadequate police training, policies, and culture as contributing factors. Pearson said he would serve on the Criminal Justice Committee of the Tennessee House of Representatives.

Pearson was sworn in on February 9, 2023. While being sworn into the house, he wore a dashiki, a traditional West African garment. Tennessee House Republican David B. Hawk commented that dress norms for the House are a way to demonstrate respect, specifically mentioning that a tie was expected, and Tennessee House Republicans tweeted to Pearson "perhaps you should explore a different career opportunity".

==== August 2023 special election ====
Pearson was initially elected to the Tennessee General Assembly in a special election in March 2023. Six days after his expulsion, on April 12, Pearson was reappointed to the Tennessee House following a unanimous vote by the Shelby County Board of Commissioners. Despite being reinstated, Pearson had to meet procedural guidelines and compete in an August special election.

==== 2024 ====
Pearson defeated David Page in the Democratic Primary with 93.4% of the vote. He went on to win the general election with 77.9% of the vote, over Independent Jeff Johnston.

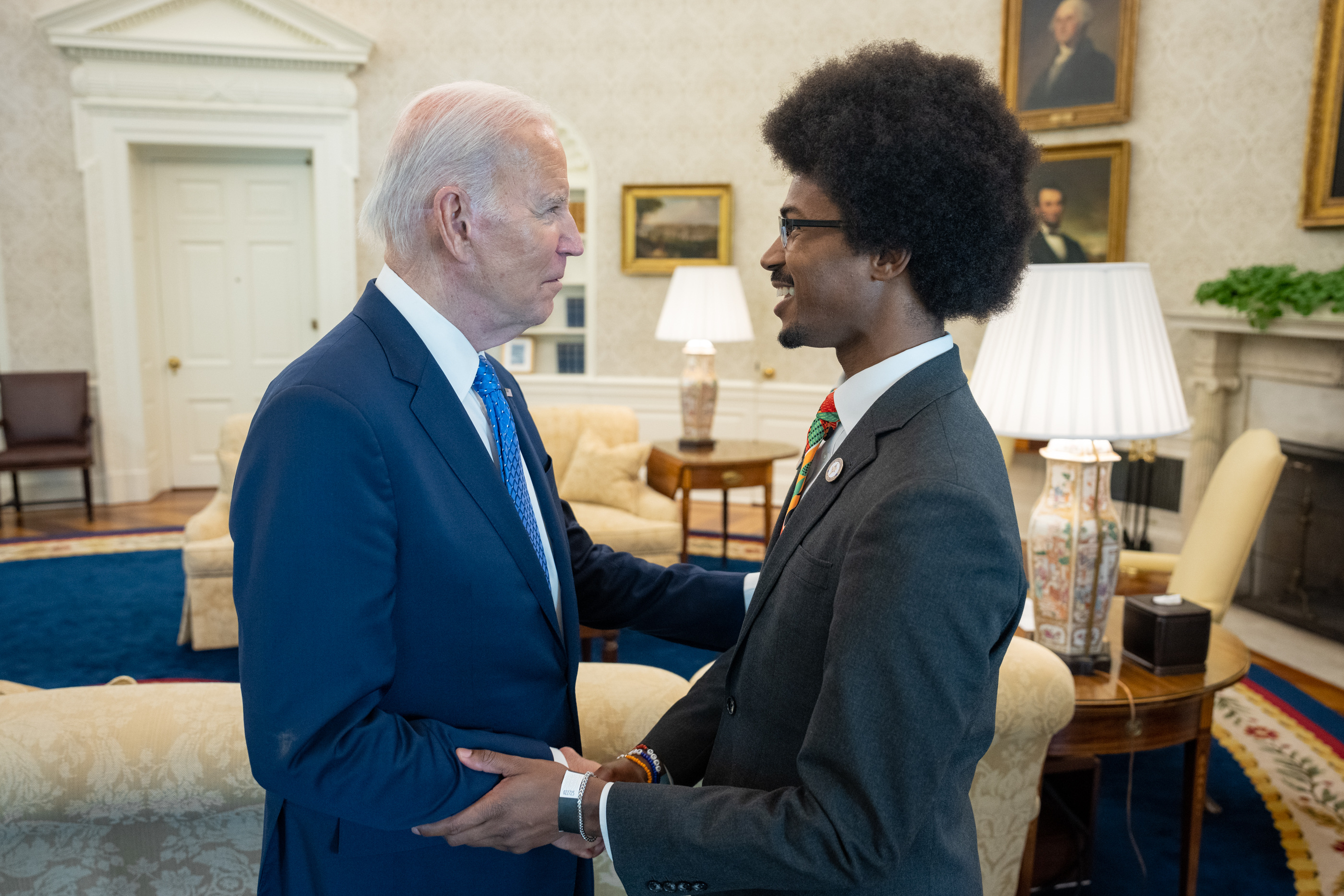
President Joe Biden with Justin Pearson at the White House in April 2023

=== Tenure ===
==== Protest and expulsion ====
Vote on expelling Justin J. Pearson. Democrat voted against expulsion Republican voted for expulsion Republican voted against expulsion Republican didn't vote Vacant

After the 2023 Covenant School shooting in Nashville that killed three nine-year-olds and three employees, Pearson joined a March 30 protest for gun control reform at the state capitol alongside Gloria Johnson and Justin Jones. Pearson, Johnson and Jones were dubbed by their supporters as "The Tennessee Three", and the Tennessee House voted on whether to expel the three members, which requires a two-thirds majority or 66 votes. Pearson was expelled by a vote of 69–26; Jones, who is also black, was expelled by 72–25. Johnson, who is white, was spared her ouster by just one vote, 65–30. In his final address to the House before his expulsion, Pearson compared his removal from the chamber to the crucifixion of Jesus Christ. On April 7, 2023, Vice President Kamala Harris visited with the trio, echoing President Joe Biden who had called them earlier, saying, "Punishing lawmakers who joined thousands of peaceful protesters calling for action" is "shocking, undemocratic, and without precedent."

==== Gun violence ====
On March 27, 2025, Pearson presented a bill to repeal Tennessee's permitless carry law, a policy that critics say has worsened the state's already dire gun violence crisis, during a House Criminal Justice Subcommittee meeting. Pearson said, "We need to do something about the gun violence epidemic, we have the power to do something about the gun violence epidemic, and we don’t just have to offer some empty thoughts and prayers." It was his first time back at the Capitol after losing his brother, Timphrance Darnell Pearson, to suicide by firearm in December. Pearson was responsible for caring for his young nephews following the death of his brother. Tennessee House Republican Andrew Farmer, who sponsored HR 63 to remove Pearson in 2023, moved to end debate and personally attacked Pearson for his absence, saying, "And I know you may have some things going on, but you have not, so I don’t think it’s fair for you to come in front of this committee and lecture us on hard work and convictions and hard work for our committee." Pearson responded with, "It is a pathetic excuse for you to not answer the question of why we are doing nothing about the gun violence epidemic, then to personally attack me," before describing making funeral arrangements and caring for his brother, even in death. After the chair cut off Pearson's mic, Pearson moved toward Farmer. The majority leader and others stepped in to hold him back. Farmer sat still, refusing to look Pearson in the eye. Both lawmakers later exited the room.

==== Immigration and Customs Enforcement ====
Pearson called for the dismantling of United States Immigration and Customs Enforcement (ICE), labeling it a "domestic terrorist organization" and "a tool of white supremacy."

At a January 20, 2026, Tennessee Progressive Caucus press conference aimed at limiting ICE's power in the state, Pearson said, "We are in that moment now, in this country and in the state of Tennessee. We have to stand up against this dictator [Donald Trump]. We have to stand up against these authoritarians and people who are misusing [and] abusing their power against folks in our community, because if any of these people who claim to be Christian actually read the Bible, they would know that you have a responsibility to protect the foreigner. They would have read that you have to care for and love your neighbor. That's what we're doing."

==== Other issues ====
Pearson introduced HB 1390 to create a petition for an extreme risk protection order, and allows a court to issue an extreme risk protection order upon a finding by clear and convincing evidence that a person poses a significant danger of causing personal injury to the person or others if allowed to possess or purchase a firearm.

Pearson has also introduced and worked legislation to increase minimum wage for state employees, increase paid bereavement leave for state employees, implement suicide prevention program at the Tennessee Department Mental Health & Substance Abuse Services, restore voting rights of convicted felons, and increase healthcare coverage for individuals below the federal poverty level.

=== Committee assignments ===
For the 114th General Assembly:

- House Committee on Private Acts
- House Committee on Transportation
- House Committee on Disaster Relief of Extraordinary Session

== 2024 Democratic National Convention ==
On Tuesday, August 20, Pearson spoke at the DNC Youth Council, discussing the importance of youth engagement, particularly Gen Z and Millennials, in November's general election.

Later Tuesday night, Pearson gave an impassioned 48-second speech during the state roll call, which was shared widely across social media. Pearson stated, "From the bluffs of Memphis to the peaks of Mountain City, the movement for justice rooted in love in Tennessee is still strong. It is a movement where kids are free from gun violence, a movement where women have the right to choose."

Pearson, alongside Johnson and Jones (the "Tennessee Three") were scheduled to speak on the final day of the convention, before Kamala Harris's speaking slot. They were removed from the agenda hours before they were set to speak.

== 2026 U.S. House campaign ==
On October 8, 2025, Pearson announced his campaign for Tennessee's 9th congressional district in 2026 at Alonzo Weaver Park, next to Mitchell High School, where he challenged the school board to deliver new books when he was a 15-year-old student there. Pearson's campaign listed several priorities, including affordable housing, "common sense gun legislation," federal funds to combat poverty and crime, "Medicare for all" and supporting military veterans.

He entered the race with support from Justice Democrats and Leaders We Deserve, a group led by former Democratic National Committee Vice Chair David Hogg. Hogg called Pearson a "tested fighter" in a statement, saying, "In this moment of crisis, I’m calling on Representative Steve Cohen to pass the torch to Justin J. Pearson — a transformational leader who can inspire a new generation," before announcing Leaders We Deserve's plans to invest $1 million in the race.

A February 2026 poll, showed the race in a virtual tie with incumbent Steve Cohen was leading Pearson 45% to 44%, with a 5.2% margin of error.

On April 29, 2026, U.S. Senator Marsha Blackburn posted on X her support of redistricting Tennessee's congressional map, following the United States Supreme Court decision in Louisiana v. Callais, partially overturning Section 2 of the Voting Rights Act of 1965. The provision helped guarantee majority-minority districts by preventing districting plans that would dilute the ability of racial minorities to elect their own representatives. On May 1, 2026, Governor Bill Lee signed a proclamation that called for a special session of the Tennessee General Assembly to begin at the Tennessee State Capitol in Nashville on May 5 in order to review the state's congressional maps. On May 6, state Republicans unveiled a proposed map showing Memphis and Shelby County carved up three ways between the 5th, 8th, and 9th congressional districts.

On May 7, the new map was passed by both the Tennessee House of Representatives and the Tennessee Senate, moving Tennessee's 9th congressional district from D+23 to R+11. Lee signed the bill into law later that day. Tennessee became the first state to pass a new congressional district map following the Supreme Court's ruling in Louisiana v. Callais the week before. Following the map's enactment, Steve Cohen withdrew his candidacy.

== Personal life ==
Justin J. Pearson lives in Memphis. He married his wife, Oceana Gilliam, in 2025. The two met in college during a summer public policy institute at the Princeton School of Public and International Affairs. Gilliam is from the South Los Angeles neighborhood of Crenshaw.

On December 1, 2024, Pearson's brother Timphrance Darnell Pearson passed away from gun suicide at age 31. Pearson addressed it saying, "I miss him every single day. I don’t know what happened and I don’t think I ever will."

== Electoral history ==
2023 Tennessee House of Representatives 86th district special election (Note: Pearson was initially elected to the Tennessee General Assembly in a special election in March 2023. After his expulsion in April 2023, he was subsequently re-elected in another special election in August 2023.)
Primary election
Party	Candidate	Votes	%
Democratic	Justin J. Pearson	1,235	52.35%
Democratic	Julian Bolton	289	12.25%
Democratic	Will Richardson	190	8.05%
Democratic	Juliette Eskridge	166	7.04%
Democratic	Clifford Lewis	126	5.34%
Democratic	Tanya Cooper	109	4.62%
Democratic	Rod Blount	103	4.37%
Democratic	Dominique Frost	95	4.03%
Democratic	Andrew Withers	35	1.48%
Democratic	Rebecca Robinson	11	0.47%
Write-in		1	0.04%
Total votes		2,360	100.00%
General election
Democratic	Justin J. Pearson	443	97.79%
Write-in		10	2.21%
Total votes		453	100.00%

2023 Tennessee House of Representatives 86th district special election
Primary election
Party	Candidate	Votes	%
Democratic	Justin J. Pearson (incumbent)	2,209	94.64%
Democratic	David Page	125	5.36%
Total votes		2,334	100.00%
General election
Democratic	Justin J. Pearson (incumbent)	2,439	93.95%
Independent	Jeff Johnston	157	6.05%
Total votes		2,596	100.00%

2024 Tennessee House of Representatives 86th district election
Primary election
Party	Candidate	Votes	%
Democratic	Justin J. Pearson (incumbent)	3,784	93.41%
Democratic	David Page	267	6.59%
Total votes		4,051	100.00%
General election
Democratic	Justin J. Pearson (incumbent)	15,612	77.87%
Independent	Jeff Johnston	4,436	22.13%
Total votes		20,048	100.00%

Tennessee's 9th congressional district elections, 2026
Primary election
Party	Candidate	Votes	%
Democratic	Justin J. Pearson	30,607	65.79%
Democratic	London Lamar	11,236	24.15%
Democratic	M. LaTroy A-Williams	3,195	6.87%
Democratic	Jim Torino	1,487	3.19%
