= Tennessee House of Representatives =

Lower house of the Tennessee General Assembly

Coordinates: 36.1656°N 86.7841°W

- Tennessee General Assembly

Type
- Type: Lower house
- Term limits: None

History
- New session started: January 14, 2025

Leadership
- Speaker: Cameron Sexton (R) since August 23, 2019
- Speaker pro tempore: Pat Marsh (R) since January 12, 2021
- Majority Leader: William Lamberth (R) since January 8, 2019
- Minority Leader: Karen Camper (D) since January 8, 2019

Structure
- Seats: 99
- Political groups: Majority: Republican (69); Minority: Democratic (30)
- Length of term: 2 years
- Authority: Article III, Tennessee Constitution
- Salary: $33,060/year + per diem, employee benefits, travel reimbursement

Elections
- Last election: November 3, 2026
- Next election: November 7, 2028
- Redistricting: Legislative Control

Meeting place
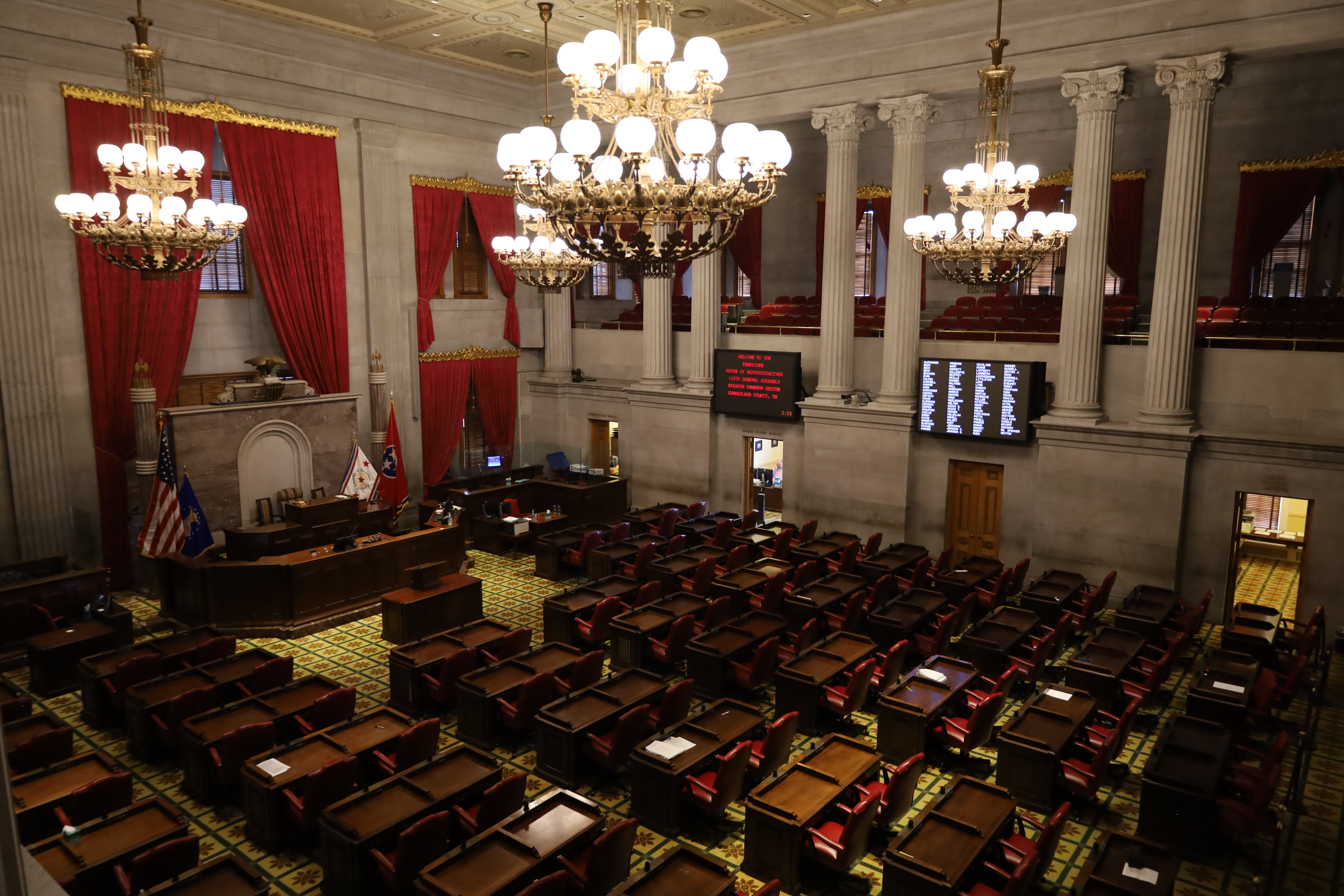
- House of Representatives Chamber; Tennessee State Capitol; Nashville, Tennessee

Website
- Tennessee House of Representatives

Rules
- Permanent Rules of Order for the 114th General Assembly

The Tennessee House of Representatives is the lower house of the Tennessee General Assembly, the state legislature of the U.S. state of Tennessee. The House convenes, along with the Senate, at the Tennessee State Capitol in Nashville.

== Constitutional requirements ==
According to the state constitution of 1870, this body is to consist of 99 members elected for two-year terms. In every even-numbered year, elections for state representative are conducted simultaneously with the elections for U.S. Representative and other offices; the primary election being held on the first Thursday in August. Seats which become vacant, such as through death, resignation, or expulsion, are filled either: by the county commission (or metropolitan county council) of the home county of the member vacating the seat if less than a year remains in the seat's term; if more than a year remains in the term, a special election is held for the balance of the term.

== Districts ==
Members are elected from single-member districts. The districts are traditionally numbered consecutively from east to west and north to south across the state; however, in recent redistricting this convention has not always been strictly adhered to, despite a constitutional provision requiring districts to be numbered consecutively.

Districts are required to be reapportioned every ten years following the federal census in order to be of substantially equal population. However, from 1902 until 1962, the General Assembly ignored this provision. It was estimated that by that point that some districts in the Memphis area had approximately ten times the population of some in rural areas. In 1962 this issue was taken to court. Despite U.S. courts having traditionally declined to rule on such issues, the U.S. Supreme Court opted to hear this case and ruled that the legislature had to comply with the state constitution, as its failure to do so was in violation of the Equal Protection Clause of the Fourteenth Amendment to the U.S. Constitution (see Baker v. Carr). Subsequent litigation has further refined the rules regarding this; in the late 1990s a majority-black district in rural West Tennessee was required to be created.

The 1960s redistricting was credited by some observers with creating the first Republican majority in the Tennessee House since Reconstruction in 1968; this situation lasted only until the next election in 1970. 1970 also marked the first election of a Republican governor in a half century and saw both houses of the legislature begin to assert themselves as a counterbalance to executive authority; prior to this time legislators had not had their own staffs or even their own offices and were largely at the mercy of what the governor's staff chose to tell them and in many ways were often something of a "rubber stamp."

== Speaker of the House ==
The Speaker of the House of Representatives is the presiding officer of the House. The Speaker is elected to a two-year term at the beginning of the 1st half of each session of the Tennessee General Assembly. Additionally, the Speaker is second in line for succession to the governorship, after the Speaker of the Senate, in the event of such need. The Speaker appoints members to all committees as well. Even though the Speaker does not have to make committee assignments proportional to the party composition, usually that discretion is used when determining such. Usually, consideration of the abilities, preferences, party representation, and seniority of the members are taken into account. The chairperson, vice chairperson, and secretary of each committee also are chosen by the Speaker and must be given the same considerations in their selection. The Speaker is a voting member of all standing committees of the House, as is the Speaker pro Tempore. The Speaker also serves as co-chairperson of the Joint Legislative Services Committee and must approve, in concurrence with the Speaker of the Senate, the directors of the offices of Legislative Information Services, Legal Services, Legislative Administration, and Legislative Budget Analysis. Additionally, the Speaker is in charge of all facilities, professional and clerical staff, and custodians and security personnel of the House. The current speaker is Cameron Sexton, who represents Tennessee's 25th district.

== Composition of the 115th General Assembly (2025–27) ==
| Affiliation | Party (shading indicates majority caucus) | | Total | Vacant |
| Affiliation | Republican | Democratic | Total | Vacant |
|---|---|---|---|---|
| End of 113th General Assembly | 75 | 24 | 99 | 0 |
| End of 114th General Assembly | 75 | 24 | 99 | 0 |
| Beginning of the 115th General Assembly | 69 | 30 | 99 | 0 |
| Latest voting share | 70% | 30% | | |

=== Leadership of the 114th General Assembly ===
| Position | Representative | District |
|---|---|---|
| Speaker | Cameron Sexton | 25 |
| Speaker Pro Tempore | Pat Marsh | 62 |
| Majority Leader | William Lamberth | 44 |
| Minority Leader | Karen Camper | 87 |

=== Members as of 2026 ===
| District | Name | Party | First elected | Residence | Counties represented |
|---|---|---|---|---|---|
| 1 | Jessica Means | Republican | 2026 | Kingsport | Part of Sullivan |
| 2 | Gary Stidham | Republican | 2026 | Kingsport | Part of Sullivan |
| 3 | Timothy Hill | Republican | 2023 | Blountville | Johnson and parts of Carter, Hawkins, and Sullivan |
| 4 | Renea Jones | Republican | 2024 | Unicoi | Unicoi and part of Carter |
| 5 | David B. Hawk | Republican | 2002 | Greeneville | Greene |
| 6 | Tim Hicks | Republican | 2020 | Jonesborough | Part of Washington |
| 7 | Rebecca Alexander | Republican | 2020 | Jonesborough | Part of Washington |
| 8 | Jordan Henderson | Republican | 2026 | Maryville | Part of Blount |
| 9 | Gary Hicks | Republican | 2016 | Rogersville | Hancock and parts of Claiborne and Hawkins |
| 10 | Rick Eldridge | Republican | 2018 | Morristown | Grainger and part Hamblen |
| 11 | Kenny Cody | Republican | 2026 | Cosby | Cocke, and parts of Jefferson and Hamblen |
| 12 | Fred Atchley | Republican | 2024 | Sevierville | Part of Sevier |
| 13 | Brett Windrow | Democratic | 2026 | La Vergne | Part of Rutherford |
| 14 | Jason Zachary | Republican | 2015 | Knoxville | Part of Knox |
| 15 | Sam McKenzie | Democratic | 2020 | Knoxville | Part of Knox |
| 16 | Michele Carringer | Republican | 2020 | Knoxville | Part of Knox |
| 17 | Andrew Farmer | Republican | 2012 | Sevierville | Parts of Jefferson and Sevier |
| 18 | Bryan Goldberg | Democratic | 2026 | Knoxville | Part of Knox |
| 19 | Dave Wright | Republican | 2018 | Corryton | Part of Knox |
| 20 | Tom Stinnett | Republican | 2024 | Friendsville | Part of Blount |
| 21 | Lowell Russell | Republican | 2018 | Vonore | Parts of Loudon and Monroe |
| 22 | Dan Howell | Republican | 2014 | Cleveland | Meigs, Polk and part of Bradley |
| 23 | Mark Cochran | Republican | 2018 | Englewood | McMinn and part of Monroe |
| 24 | Kevin Raper | Republican | 2022 | Cleveland | Part of Bradley |
| 25 | Cameron Sexton | Republican | 2010 | Crossville | Cumberland and part of Putnam |
| 26 | Greg Martin | Republican | 2022 | Hixson | Part of Hamilton |
| 27 | Michele Reneau | Republican | 2024 | Signal Mountain | Part of Hamilton |
| 28 | Yusuf Hakeem | Democratic | 2018 | Chattanooga | Part of Hamilton |
| 29 | Greg Vital | Republican | 2021 | Harrison | Part of Hamilton |
| 30 | Esther Helton | Republican | 2018 | East Ridge | Part of Hamilton |
| 31 | Andy Swafford | Republican | 2026 | Pikeville | Bledsoe, Sequatchie, Rhea and Van Buren |
| 32 | Jack Stockton | Republican | 2026 | Kingston | Parts of Roane and part of Loudon |
| 33 | Rick Scarbrough | Republican | 2024 | Oak Ridge | Part of Anderson |
| 34 | Owen Farnsworth | Democratic | 2026 | Murfreesboro | Part of Rutherford |
| 35 | William Slater | Republican | 2022 | Gallatin | Trousdale and part of Sumner |
| 36 | Noah Smith | Republican | 2026 | Jacksboro | Campbell, Union and part of Claiborne |
| 37 | Charlie Baum | Republican | 2018 | Murfreesboro | Part of Rutherford |
| 38 | Kelly Keisling | Republican | 2010 | Byrdstown | Macon, Clay, Pickett, Scott, and part of Fentress |
| 39 | Iris Rudder | Republican | 2018 | Winchester | Franklin and Marion |
| 40 | Michael Hale | Republican | 2022 | Smithville | Cannon, DeKalb, Jackson, Smith, and part of Wilson |
| 41 | Ed Butler | Republican | 2022 | Cookeville | Overton, Morgan and parts of Anderson, Fentress, and Roane |
| 42 | Ryan Williams | Republican | 2010 | Cookeville | Part of Putnam |
| 43 | Paul Sherrell | Republican | 2016 | Sparta | Warren and White |
| 44 | William Lamberth | Republican | 2012 | Portland | Part of Sumner |
| 45 | Brian Stewart | Republican | 2026 | Hendersonville | Part of Sumner |
| 46 | Clark Boyd | Republican | 2018 | Lebanon | Part of Wilson |
| 47 | Rush Bricken | Republican | 2018 | Tullahoma | Coffee and Grundy |
| 48 | Bryan Terry | Republican | 2018 | Murfreesboro | Part of Rutherford |
| 49 | Connie Casha | Democratic | 2026 | Smyrna | Part of Rutherford |
| 50 | Bo Mitchell | Democratic | 2012 | Nashville | Part of Davidson |
| 51 | Aftyn Behn | Democratic | 2023 | Nashville | Part of Davidson |
| 52 | Justin Jones | Democratic | 2023 | Nashville | Part of Davidson |
| 53 | Jason Powell | Democratic | 2012 | Nashville | Part of Davidson |
| 54 | Vincent Dixie | Democratic | 2018 | Nashville | Part of Davidson |
| 55 | John Ray Clemmons | Democratic | 2014 | Nashville | Part of Davidson |
| 56 | Bob Freeman | Democratic | 2018 | Nashville | Part of Davidson |
| 57 | Susan Lynn | Republican | 2002 | Mt. Juliet | Part of Wilson |
| 58 | Harold M. Love Jr. | Democratic | 2012 | Nashville | Part of Davidson |
| 59 | Mark Proctor | Democratic | 2026 | Nashville | Part of Davidson |
| 60 | Shaundelle Brooks | Democratic | 2024 | Hermitage | Part of Davidson |
| 61 | Gino Bulso | Republican | 2022 | Brentwood | Part of Williamson |
| 62 | Pat Marsh | Republican | 2009 | Shelbyville | Bedford, Moore, and part of Lincoln |
| 63 | Jake McCalmon | Republican | 2022 | Franklin | Part of Williamson |
| 64 | Scott Cepicky | Republican | 2018 | Culleoka | Part of Maury |
| 65 | Lee Reeves | Republican | 2024 | Franklin | Part of Williamson |
| 66 | Sabi "Doc" Kumar | Republican | 2014 | Springfield | Robertson |
| 67 | Ronnie Glynn | Democratic | 2022 | Clarksville | Part of Montgomery |
| 68 | Aron Maberry | Republican | 2024 | Clarksville | Part of Montgomery |
| 69 | Jody Barrett | Republican | 2022 | Dickson | Hickman, Lewis and part of Dickson |
| 70 | Clay Doggett | Republican | 2018 | Pulaski | Giles and parts of Lawrence and Lincoln |
| 71 | Kip Capley | Republican | 2022 | Summertown | Wayne and parts of Hardin, Lawrence, and Maury |
| 72 | Kirk Haston | Republican | 2018 | Lobelville | Henderson, Chester, Decatur, Perry, and part of Hardin |
| 73 | Chris Todd | Republican | 2018 | Humboldt | Part of Madison |
| 74 | Jay Reedy | Republican | 2014 | Erin | Benton, Houston, Humphreys, Stewart, and part of Henry |
| 75 | Allie Phillips | Democratic | 2026 | Clarksville | Part of Montgomery |
| 76 | Tandy Darby | Republican | 2020 | Greenfield | Weakley and parts of Henry and Carroll |
| 77 | Rusty Grills | Republican | 2020 | Newbern | Dyer, Lake and part of Obion |
| 78 | Perry Keenan | Republican | 2026 | Ashland City | Cheatham and part of Dickson |
| 79 | Brock Martin | Republican | 2022 | Huntingdon | Parts of Carroll, Gibson and Henderson |
| 80 | Andrea Bond Johnson | Democratic | 2026 | Brownsville | Parts of Hardeman, Haywood and Madison |
| 81 | Brett Giannini | Republican | 2026 | Atoka | Tipton and part of Haywood |
| 82 | Chris Hurt | Republican | 2018 | Halls | Crockett, Lauderdale and parts of Gibson and Obion |
| 83 | Mark White | Republican | 2010 | Memphis | Part of Shelby |
| 84 | Matthew Szalaj | Democratic | 2026 | Memphis | Part of Shelby |
| 85 | Jesse Chism | Democratic | 2018 | Memphis | Part of Shelby |
| 86 | Justin J. Pearson | Democratic | 2023 | Memphis | Part of Shelby |
| 87 | Karen Camper | Democratic | 2008 | Memphis | Part of Shelby |
| 88 | Larry Miller | Democratic | 1992 | Memphis | Part of Shelby |
| 89 | Justin Lafferty | Republican | 2018 | Knoxville | Part of Knox |
| 90 | Gloria Johnson | Democratic | 2012 | Knoxville | Part of Knox |
| 91 | Torrey Harris | Democratic | 2020 | Memphis | Part of Shelby |
| 92 | Todd Warner | Republican | 2020 | Lewisburg | Marshall and part of Williamson |
| 93 | John Bradley | Democratic | 2026 | Memphis | Part of Shelby |
| 94 | Ron Gant | Republican | 2016 | Rossville | Fayette, McNairy and part of Hardeman |
| 95 | Kevin Vaughan | Republican | 2017 | Collierville | Part of Shelby |
| 96 | Telisa Franklin | Democratic | 2026 | Bartlett | Part of Shelby |
| 97 | Jesse Huseth | Democratic | 2026 | Memphis | Part of Shelby |
| 98 | Antonio Parkinson | Democratic | 2011 | Memphis | Part of Shelby |
| 99 | Tom Leatherwood | Republican | 2018 | Arlington | Part of Shelby |

== House committees ==
Committees, subcommittees, and their leadership for the 112th General Assembly are as follows:

Standing committees
| Committees | Chair | Vice Chair | Subcommittees |
|---|---|---|---|
| Agriculture and Natural Resources | Rep. Curtis Halford (R) | Rep. Rusty Grills (R) | Agriculture and Natural Resources, Chair: Rep. Chris Todd (R) |
| Calendar and Rules | Rep. Jason Zachary (R) | Rep. Lowell Russell (R) | |
| Civil Justice | Rep. Andrew Farmer (R) | Rep. Darren Jernigan (D) | Civil Justice, Chair: Rep. Andrew Farmer (R) Children and Family Affairs, Chair: Rep. Mary Littleton (R) |
| Commerce | Rep. Kevin Vaughn (R) | Rep. Rush Bricken (R) | Banking and Consumer Affairs, Chair: Rep. Dennis Powers (R) Business and Utilities, Chair: Rep. Clark Boyd (R) |
| Criminal Justice | Vacant | Rep. Jerry Sexton (R) | Criminal Justice, Chair: Rep. Clay Doggett (R) |
| Education Administration | Rep. Mark White (R) | Rep. Chris Hurt (R) | K-12, Chair: Rep. Kirk Haston (R) Higher Education, Chair: Rep. Justin Lafferty (R) |
| Education Instruction | Rep. Debra Moody (R) | Rep. Terri Lynn Weaver (R) | Education Instruction, Chair: Rep. Scott Cepicky (R) |
| Finance, Ways, and Means | Rep. Patsy Hazelwood (R) | Rep. Charlie Baum (R) | Finance, Ways, and Means, Chair: Rep. Gary. Hicks (R) Appropriations, Chair: Rep. Ryan Williams (R) |
| Government Operations | Rep. John Ragan (R) | Rep. Jay Reedy (R) | |
| Health | Rep. Bryan Terry (R) | Rep. Tom Leatherwood (R) | Health, Chair: Rep. Bob Ramsey (R) |
| Insurance | Rep. Sabi Kumar (R) | Rep. Iris Rudder (R) | Insurance, Chair: Rep. David Hawk (R) |
| Local | Rep. John Crawford (R) | Rep. Dave Wright (R) | Cities, Chair: Rep. Jerome Moon (R) Elections and Campaign Finance, Chair: Rep. Tim Rudd (R) Property and Planning, Chair: Rep. Dale Carr (R) |
| Naming and Designating | Rep. John Mark Windle (D) | Rep. David Byrd (R) | |
| State | Rep. Kelly Keisling (R) | Rep. Rick Eldridge (R) | Corrections, Chair: Rep. Bud Hulsey (R) Departments and Agencies, Chair: Rep. John Holsclaw (R) Public Service, Chair: Rep. Esther Helton (R) |
| Transportation | Rep. Dan Howell (R) | Rep. Mark Hall (R) | Transportation, Chair: Rep. Sam Whitson (R) |

Select committees
| Committees | Chair | Subcommittees |
|---|---|---|
| Rules | Rep. Pat Marsh (R) | |
| Ethics | Rep. Curtis Johnson (R) | Ethics, Chair: Rep. Pat Marsh (R) |

== Expulsion of members ==
The Tennessee House of Representatives requires a two-thirds majority of the total membership to expel another representative. Since the Civil War, ten representatives have been expelled. Six representatives were expelled in 1866 for attempting to prevent passage of the 14th Amendment, which granted citizenship to former slaves. In 1980, Republican representative Robert Fisher was expelled for bribery. Republican representative Jeremy Durham was expelled in 2016 for sexual misconduct. Representatives Justin Jones and Justin J. Pearson were expelled in 2023 for violating decorum rules by leading a gun control protest on the House floor during a legislative session. Local county governments in their districts exercised their right to appoint interim successors to reappoint Jones and Pearson. They both won the ensuing special elections to fill the remainder of their terms. Representative Gloria Johnson also participated in the demonstration, but avoided expulsion by one vote.

== Education level among members ==
Among Republicans, around 30% of all members hold no degree beyond high school completion, less than 20% hold a Master's or other post baccalaureate degree, and less than 10% have a law degree. Among Democrats, of whom there are a substantially lower number, 15% hold no degree beyond high school, around 30% hold a Master's or other post baccalaureate degree, and 25% have a law degree.

== Diversity among representatives ==
November 2020 saw the election of first openly LGBT people ever to hold seats in Tennessee's state house of representatives, Democrat Torrey Harris and Republican Eddie Mannis. Before November 3, 2020, Tennessee was one of just five states in the nation (others being Alaska, Delaware, Louisiana and Mississippi) to have never elected an out LGBT person to its state legislature. Eddie Mannis did not seek reelection after a single term, citing bullying by the Republican caucus.

Of its 99 members, twenty-one were women in 2020. Representatives Harold Love and Raumesh Akbari hold leadership roles in the National Black Caucus of State Legislators, in which eight Tennessee state lawmakers are members. Akbari is also a State Director with Women in Government, as is Brenda Gilmore.

== See also ==
- Tennessee Senate
- List of Tennessee General Assemblies
