= Justin Jones (Tennessee politician) =

American activist and politician (born 1995)

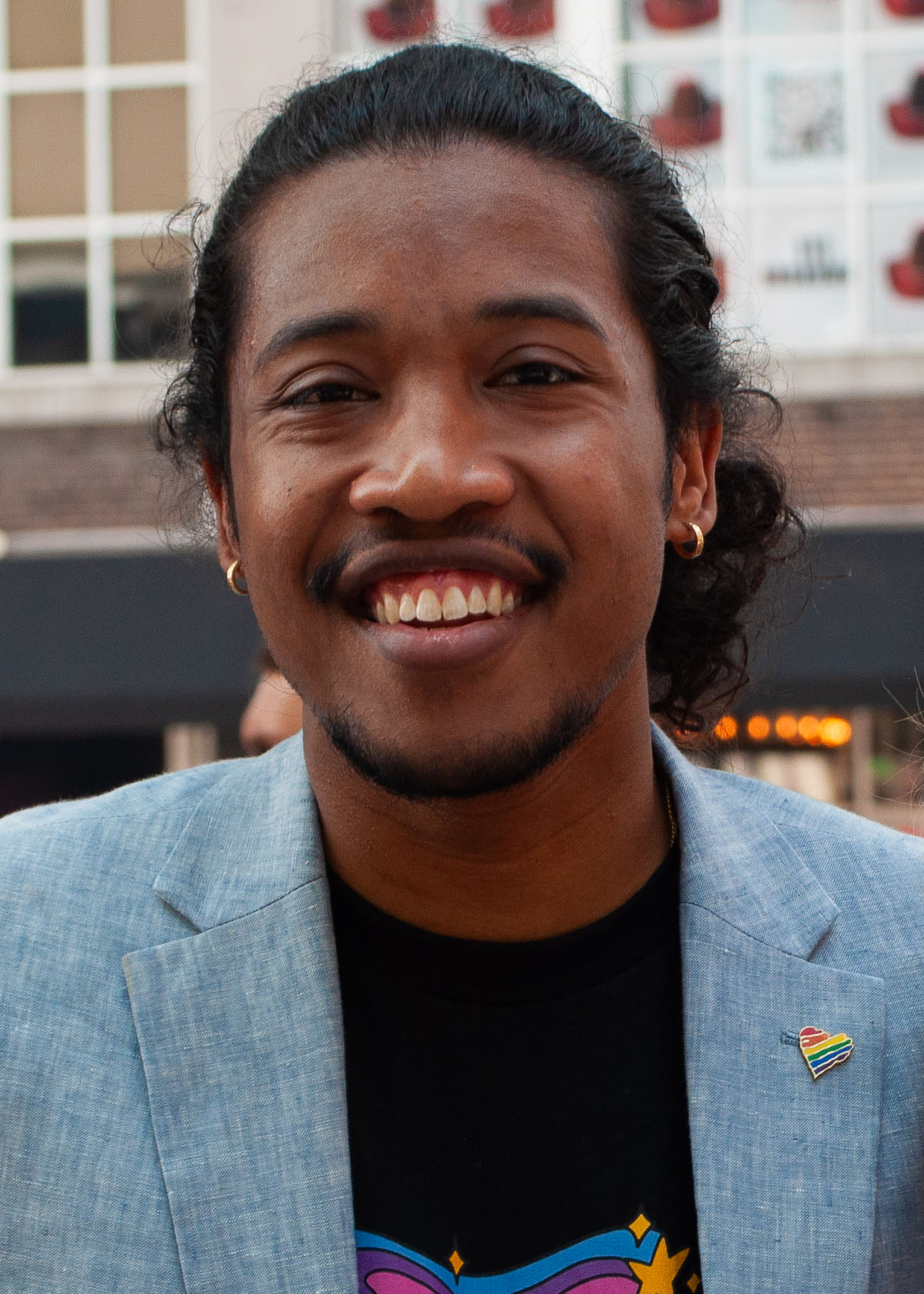
- Jones in 2023

Member of the Tennessee House of Representatives from the 52nd district
- Incumbent
- Assumed office April 10, 2023
- In office January 10, 2023 – April 6, 2023
- Preceded by: Mike Stewart

Personal details
- Born: Justin Bautista-Jones; August 25, 1995 (age 31) Oakland, California, U.S.
- Party: Democratic
- Education: Fisk University (BA); Vanderbilt University

Justin Bautista-Jones (born August 25, 1995) is an American activist and politician from the state of Tennessee. A member of the Democratic Party, he serves in the Tennessee House of Representatives for the 52nd district, representing parts of Nashville. He was expelled in April 2023 for violating decorum rules by leading a gun control protest on the House floor after the 2023 Covenant school shooting. The Nashville Metro Council voted unanimously to reinstate Jones as an interim representative pending a special election to fill the seat. He later won a special election in August 2023 to continue serving as a full member, and again in November 2024 to serve his second term.

== Early life and education ==
Jones was born on August 25, 1995, in Oakland, California to a Filipina mother and an African American father. His mother, Christine, raised Justin and his sister while putting herself through nursing school. He is the grandson of black, working-class grandparents from the South Side of Chicago and Filipino immigrants of Ibanag and Aeta ancestry who migrated to California. He earned a Bachelor of Arts from Fisk University and enrolled at Vanderbilt Divinity School. In 2019, he campaigned for the removal of a bust of Nathan Bedford Forrest from the Tennessee State Capitol.

== Early career ==
In 2019, Jones announced his candidacy for the United States House of Representatives in Tennessee's 5th congressional district against Jim Cooper in the 2020 elections. He did not submit enough valid signatures to make the ballot.

Jones was arrested for refusing to leave a rally held by Marsha Blackburn in October 2018. He was charged in 2019 with assaulting Glen Casada, a member of the Tennessee House of Representatives, by allegedly throwing a drink, believed to be a hot coffee, at him. He was also banned from the Capitol. Casada later agreed to drop the charges.

In 2020, Jones organized a 62-day sit-in protest for racial justice outside the state capitol after the murder of George Floyd. He was charged with reckless endangerment after throwing a traffic cone into a moving truck's open driver-side window; Jones claimed that the driver was threatening him and using racial slurs. He faced a total of 14 charges for various incidents during the extended protest. Many of the charges were dropped in July 2021, but the reckless endangerment charges remained. An assault charge regarding Jones allegedly hitting a Tennessee Highway Patrol trooper with a bullhorn in July 2020 was dismissed by a judge in April 2023.

== Tennessee House of Representatives ==
=== 2022 election ===
In 2022, Jones ran to succeed State Representative Mike Stewart as the member of the Tennessee House for the 52nd district. Jones defeated Delishia Porterfield, a member of the Metropolitan Council of Nashville and Davidson County, in the Democratic Party primary election. He won the general election without opposition.

=== Protest and expulsion ===
Vote on expelling Justin Jones. Democrat voted against expulsion Republican voted for expulsion Republican voted against expulsion Republican didn't vote

After the March 2023 Covenant School shooting, Jones joined a protest alongside Gloria Johnson and Justin J. Pearson for gun control reform that disrupted House proceedings at the state capitol. The demonstration violated the chamber's decorum rules, as the three members were not recognized to speak and utilized a bullhorn. He was removed from his committees as a result. On April 5, Rep. Jones filed a police report after he was allegedly assaulted on the House floor by Rep. Justin Lafferty. Prior to his expulsion vote, Jones accused Representative Sabi "Doc" Kumar of putting a "brown face to white supremacy"; Kumar also stated that Jones had pointed in his face and told him, "Kumar, they will never accept you."

The Tennessee House voted on April 6, to expel Jones, alongside Pearson, who are both black. Johnson, who is white, survived by a single vote. Johnson argued that her race was the reason she was not expelled, while Republican members noted that she did not take the protest as far as Jones and Pearson. The resolution, HR 65, was sponsored by Bud Hulsey and co-sponsored by Gino Bulso, Andrew Farmer, and Johnny Garrett; it passed with a vote of 72–25. The Metropolitan Council of Nashville and Davidson County set a meeting to discuss an interim appointment to the vacant District 52 on April 10. Jones was appointed interim representative to his former seat by a unanimous vote of 36–0.

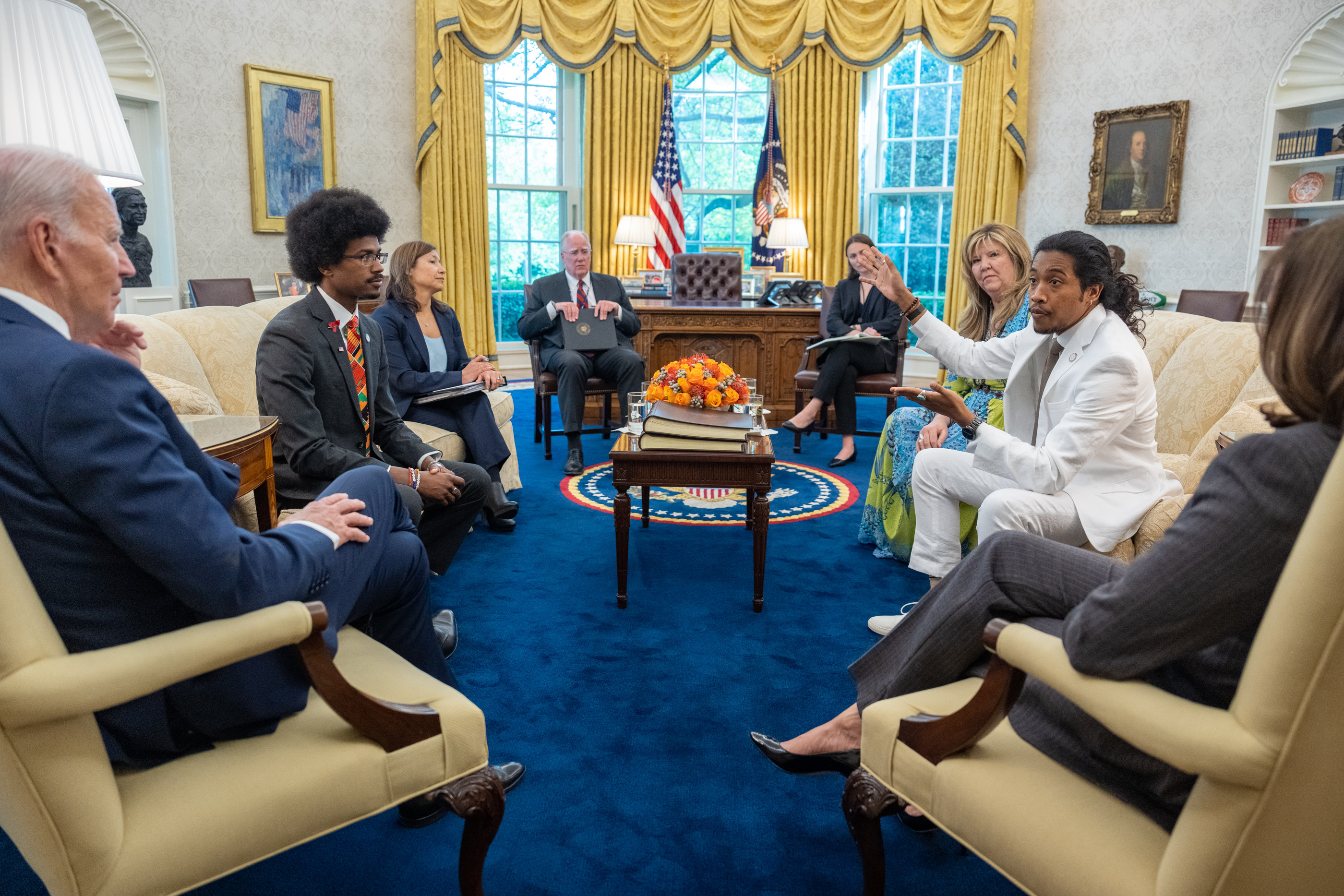
Jones, Johnson, and Pearson speak with President Biden and Vice President Harris, at the White House in April 2023.

On April 24, Jones, alongside Justin Pearson and Gloria Johnson, were received by President Joe Biden at the White House. During his appearance at Netroots Nation in July, Jones accused House leadership of fascism, and stated his belief that the heirs of the Ku Klux Klan run the state government.

=== Aftermath ===
On January 10, 2024, Jones became the first lawmaker penalized under a new rule that allows the Tennessee legislature to vote to silence, for the remainder of the day, any lawmaker who is ruled out of order. The rule was evoked against Jones after he described Speaker Cameron Sexton as "drunk with power."

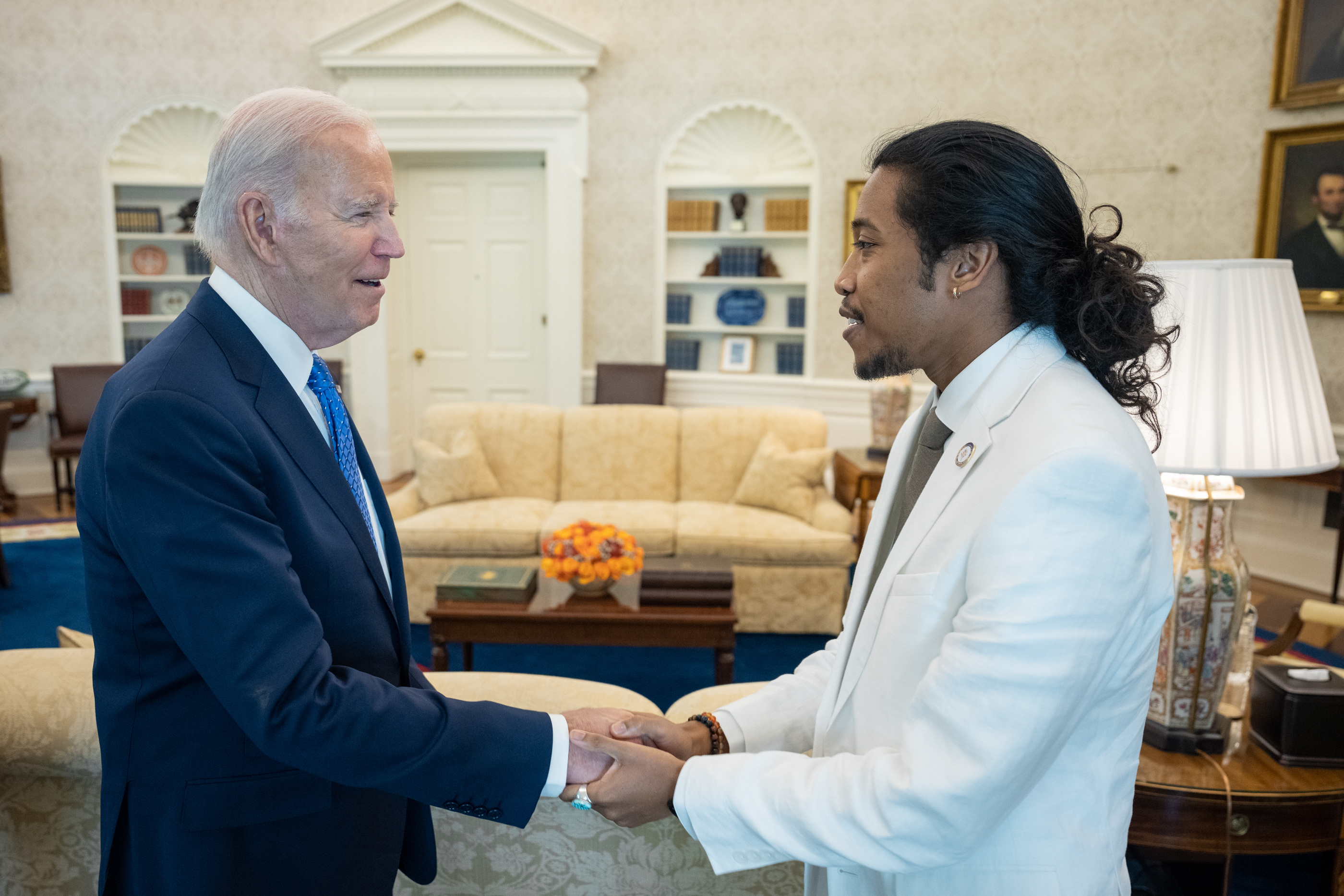
President Joe Biden with Justin Jones at the White House in April 2023

On January 30, 2024, a Tennessee legislative staffer was placed on leave after confronting Jones in the hallway and yelling at him until another lawmaker intervened.

Jones, along with Rep. Justin J. Pearson, D-Memphis and Rep. Gloria Johnson, D-Knoxville, were scheduled to speak at 2024 Democratic National Convention in Chicago, but were omitted with no explanation. The 2024 convention program had experienced issues running behind-schedule.

On May 7, 2026, Jones burned a picture of a Confederate flag during a protest following Tennessee's voter redistricting decision shortly after the Supreme Court case of Louisiana v. Callais.

== Electoral history ==
2022 Tennessee House of Representatives 52nd district election
Primary election
Party	Candidate	Votes	%
Democratic	Justin Jones	1,956	53.24
Democratic	Delishia Porterfield	1,718	46.76
Total votes		3,674	100.00
General election
Democratic	Justin Jones	8,596	100.00
Total votes		8,596	100.00

2024 Tennessee House of Representatives 52nd district election
Primary election
Party	Candidate	Votes	%
Democratic	Justin Jones (incumbent)	3,127	100.00
Total votes		3,127	100.00
General election
Democratic	Justin Jones (incumbent)	13,479	69.22
Republican	Laura Nelson	5,995	30.78
Total votes		19,474	100.00
