= 2023 Nashville school shooting =

Mass shooting in Tennessee, U.S.

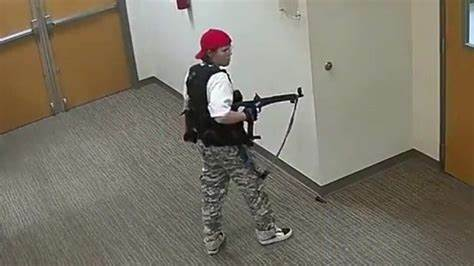
- A CCTV still of Hale, carrying a pistol-caliber carbine, walking around the second floor of the school during the shooting
- Location: 36°05′35″N 86°49′32″W; Green Hills, Nashville, Tennessee, U.S.
- Date: March 27, 2023; 3 years ago 10:11 – 10:27 a.m. (CDT; UTC−05:00)
- Target: Students and staff at The Covenant School
- Attack type: Mass shooting, mass murder, school shooting, pedicide
- Weapons: 5.56×45mm NATO Lead Star Arms Grunt AR-15–style pistol; 9mm Kel-Tec SUB-2000 pistol carbine; 9mm Smith & Wesson M&P9 Shield EZ pistol
- Deaths: 7 (including the perpetrator)
- Injuries: 2 (1 by gunfire) (Note: An injured victim was a police officer who cut his hand on shattered glass.)
- Perpetrator: Aiden Hale (Note: In the immediate aftermath of the murder rampage, police identified him by his birthname, Audrey Elizabeth Hale. Hale was a transgender man who went by male pronouns.)
- Defenders: Officer Rex Engelbert; Detective Michael Collazo
- Motive: Infamy; Columbine copycat crime

On March 27, 2023, a mass shooting occurred at The Covenant School, a Presbyterian Church in America parochial elementary school in the Green Hills neighborhood of Nashville, Tennessee, United States. Aiden Hale (born Audrey Elizabeth Hale), a 28-year-old transgender man and former student of the school, killed three nine‑year‑old children and three adults before officer Rex Engelbert and detective Michael Collazo, members of the Metropolitan Nashville Police Department (MNPD), shot and killed him. Hale was a former student of the school who had been planning the attack for several years.

In April 2025, the MNPD closed its investigation into the shooting, concluding that Hale had been motivated by numerous factors, including a desire for notoriety and media attention. Hale had chosen The Covenant School as he wanted to die somewhere that made him happy, and he considered the years he attended the school to be the happiest of his life.

== Background ==
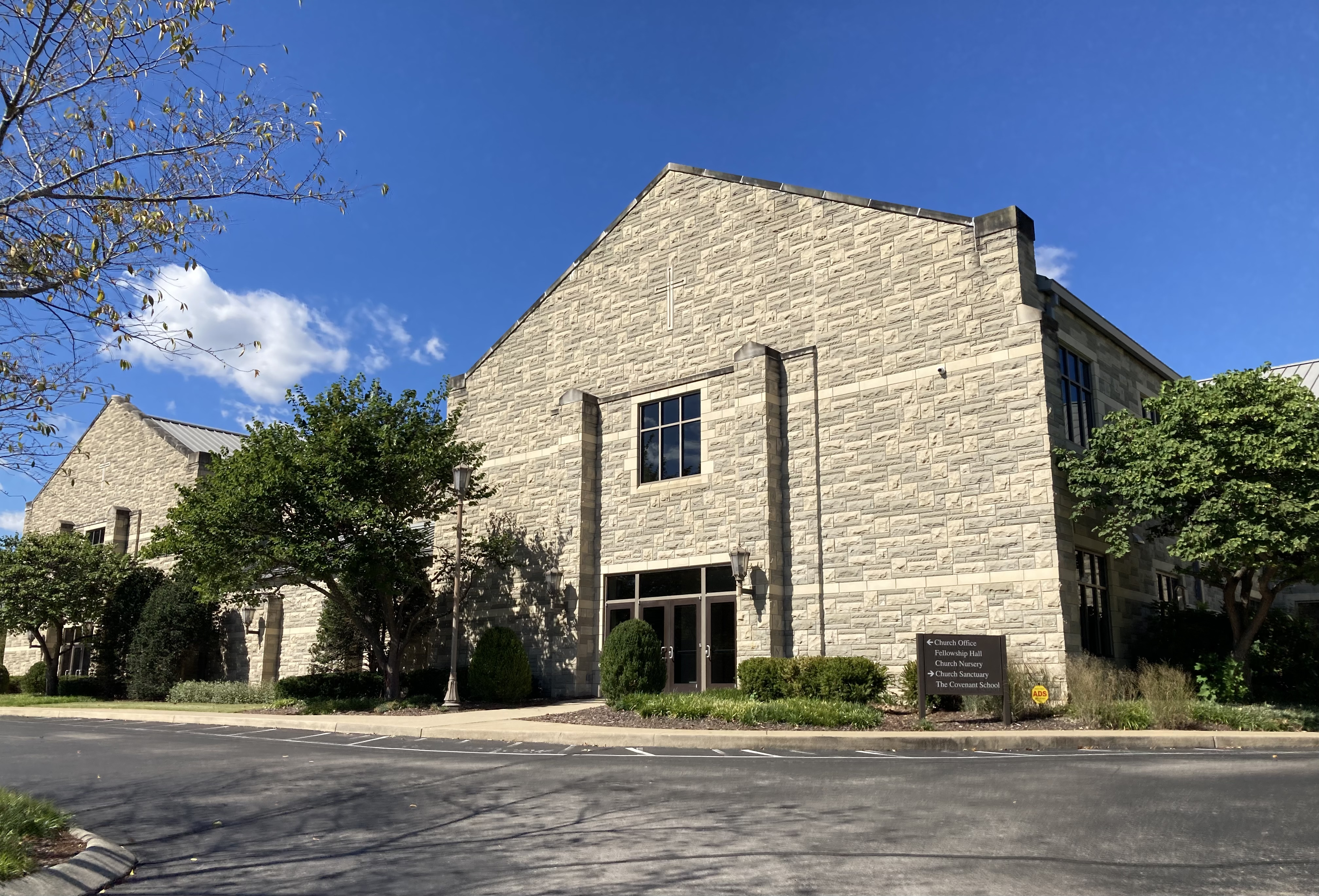
The Covenant School's campus pictured in October 2023

The Covenant School is a private Christian school in the Green Hills neighborhood of Nashville. It educates students from pre-kindergarten to the sixth grade. It was founded in 2001 as a ministry of Nashville's Covenant Presbyterian Church, a congregation of the Presbyterian Church in America; its enrollment is about 200 students.

== Shooting ==
CCTV footage released by Nashville Police showing Hale entering and walking throughout the school armed during the shooting

At around 8:00 a.m. CDT Hale left home with a large duffle bag containing weapons and tactical gear, drove to a shooting range, put on a tactical vest, and prepared the weapons. Hale left the range at 9:33 and drove to The Covenant School, where he arrived at 9:53. At 9:57, Hale sent an Instagram message to an old friend saying that an earlier post was "basically a suicide note" and expressed a desire to die that day. The friend called the Suicide Prevention Help Line and contacted the Davidson County Sheriff's Office at 10:13, but was on hold with the sheriff's office for roughly seven minutes.

At 10:09, Hale approached one of the entrances on the building's west side armed with an AR-15-style pistol, a KelTec SUB-2000 carbine, and a Smith & Wesson M&P Shield pistol. At 10:11, Hale fired through a set of glass side doors, climbed through them, and entered the building. Custodian Michael Hill was cleaning a room adjacent to the Youth Center but moved to investigate. They spotted each other at the same time, at which point Hill attempted to flee but was shot several times in the back. Gun smoke from the AR pistol triggered the fire alarm and locked the doors separating the church from the school.

Hale proceeded to a stairwell leading to the second floor. A class of third-graders were following evacuation protocols and descending the staircase with a substitute teacher, Cynthia Peak, who had come from the office. As the students entered the stairwell, Hale fired several shots with the AR pistol and struck the substitute teacher and three students. The remaining students and teachers ran back into their classrooms and barricaded themselves. Hale emptied the remainder of the AR pistol's magazine into a classroom door on the second floor, then loaded another magazine and fired through the door of an adjacent classroom; one student was injured by flying debris. Attempting to find the source of the fire alarm, executive principal Dr. Katherine Koonce entered the hallway. When she asked what Hale was doing in the school, Hale shot her with the AR pistol before switching to the Shield pistol and firing again. Upon hearing the gunfire in the hallway, the staff in the office barricaded themselves inside and contacted other teachers to alert them. Some classes had already assembled outside. Upon realizing the situation was not a fire and instead an active shooter, the teachers stopped evacuation measures and ordered everyone inside. Some instead ran through the woods to the fire station near the south entrance of the campus or to the north. At 10:13, police received a 911 call about an active shooter.

Hale spent the next several minutes moving through the hallways of the school brandishing a carbine, entering several rooms near Koonce's body but not encountering anyone. At 10:18 Hale walked towards the church offices and searched them, finding nobody despite several staff members hiding there. At 10:19, Hale descended a nearby stairwell by the northwest entrance and walked through the lounge adjacent to the cafeteria and the student lobby. Upon reaching the end of the hall leading to the main lobby for the sanctuary Hale fired several shots into wall-mounted television sets, then fired through the doors leading to the Pre-K and kindergarten. Hale then ascended back to the second floor and entered the sanctuary, fired through a stained glass window depicting Adam and Eve, and returned to the upper level of the lobby. Police had arrived at 10:19 and parked directly in front of the church, on the east side of the building. When officers arrived, a teacher told them the students were in lockdown and that two were missing. The first officer entered through one of the west entrances at 10:20 but could not hear any gunfire. He then joined other officers at the south entrance.

Around this same time, Hale spotted police and took up a firing position at a large window overlooking the south side parking lot. Hale fired on the officers through the window for over two minutes, deflating the tires of two police vehicles and forcing officers to take cover behind their vehicles. While Hale was firing, at 10:25, officers entered the building from the south entrance. They initially searched several rooms on the first floor, but ascended to the second floor after hearing gunfire coming from there. Due to the fire alarm, the sound of gunfire, and wearing earplugs, Hale did not hear the officers approaching. One officer fired his rifle, and Hale collapsed. Officers shouted to stop moving and approached to make an arrest, but observed that Hale was still in possession of firearms and that Hale's arms were moving. A second officer then fired his pistol and fatally wounded Hale. According to an autopsy report Hale was shot four times: once in the head, once in the torso, once in the left arm, and once in the right thigh. Police confirmed Hale was dead at 10:27.

A reunification center was set up by the Metro Nashville Police Department at the Woodmont Baptist Church; students were taken there by school bus in the afternoon. An investigative report conducted by the MNPD concluded that Hale had fired 152 rounds during the attack: 126 from his AR-pistol, 25 from his carbine, and once from his pistol. Hale was also found with 272 live rounds on his person (199 5.56 cartridges and 73 9mm cartridges). In his car, several items were found, such as his wallet, car keys, cellphone, a backpack containing two notebooks, several stuffed animals, and five fully loaded 5.56 magazines. In Hale's residence, a short-barreled 12-gauge shotgun was found in his closet, and a suicide note addressed to his parents was found on his desk.

=== Victims ===
Six people—three students and three staff—were killed at random. Five were pronounced dead at a hospital and one at the scene. The deceased students were Evelyn Dieckhaus, William Kinney, and Hallie Scruggs, all aged 9. (Note: Police Chief John Drake said in a press briefing on March 27, 2023, that one of the children was aged 8, while Public Affairs Director Don Aaron said that all the children were aged 9 in the same press briefing. Most sources say that all three were 9.) The deceased faculty members were substitute teacher Cynthia Peak, 61; custodian Mike Hill, 61; and the school's headmaster Katherine Koonce, 60. In addition, a third-grade student was shot and injured, and a police officer was hurt after cutting his hand on shattered glass.

== Perpetrator ==
Aiden Hale (March 25, 1995 – March 27, 2023), was a 28-year-old former student of The Covenant School and a Nashville resident with no criminal record. Hale had attended the Covenant School from 2001 to 2006 (kindergarten through fourth grade). Hale considered those years the happiest of his life, claiming he felt "safe and accepted" there.

Hale then attended Isaiah T. Creswell Middle School of the Arts (also known as Creswell Middle School). Here, he played on the girls' basketball team during the 2008-2009 school year. While Hale was constantly bullied at the school, the girls on the basketball team were very kind to him, which reportedly led to Hale having a lifetime obsession with them. One of the girls told The Tennessean that Hale had proceeded to stalk her on social media years prior to the shooting, saying: "It felt obsessive. It felt like stalkerish behavior." Another girl who was on the team passed away in a car crash in August 2022, which greatly upset Hale, who attended her funeral. In 2010, Hale entered the Nashville School of the Arts, where he graduated in 2014. According to a friend, Hale "had a childlike obsession with staying a child". Hale was an illustrator and graphic designer who graduated from the Nossi College of Art & Design in 2022. A neighbor said Hale lived with his parents.

Hale became fascinated with school shootings in 2017, after watching numerous documentaries about the Columbine massacre. In 2018, Hale began planning an attack on Creswell Middle School, however in January 2021, he instead chose The Covenant School out of fear of being labelled a racist due to the middle school's mostly black population. The attack was initially set to occur on April 13, 2021, to be near the anniversary of the Columbine massacre. He ultimately decided he wouldn’t be able to and chose a different date. On September 14, 2021, Hale went to The Covenant School and was able to get a faculty-guided tour soon after. Hale photographed and filmed locations within the school. MNPD Police Chief John Drake said Hale was under care for an emotional disorder and had legally purchased seven firearms, including three recovered from the shooting scene, between October 2020 and June 2022.

=== Gender ===
Police first referred to Hale as a woman and used his birth name. On the day of the shooting, MNPD Chief John Drake said that authorities "feel that [Hale] identifies as trans, but we're still in the initial investigation into all of that". Media sources subsequently reported Hale was a trans man. His former art teacher and a former classmate recalled him coming out as transgender on Facebook in 2022. Reactions to Hale’s gender came under scrutiny and many criticized media outlets for misgendering him.

== Investigation ==
The MNPD took the lead of the investigation of the shooting, assisted by the Tennessee Bureau of Investigation, Federal Bureau of Investigation, and the Bureau of Alcohol, Tobacco, Firearms and Explosives. Two shotguns, one of which was sawed-off, and other evidence were found in a search of the Hales' house. Evidence included a detailed map of the school with potential entry points and a manifesto. Hale was believed to have undertaken reconnaissance, and had originally considered targeting another location but had decided not to carry out the attack due to the level of security on the premises. On April 3, police said Hale planned the shooting for months and fired 152 rounds at the school, 126 of them 5.56 rifle rounds and 26 of them 9mm rounds.

Hale's surviving writings, including diaries and a planning document, initially called a "manifesto", were described by police as "rambling" and empty of any specific political or social issues. Three pages of Hale's diary, described by CNN as containing "hate-filled language" directed at the school and its children, were leaked by conservative commentator Steven Crowder on November 6, 2023. In the pages released by Crowder, Hale allegedly wrote: "Wanna kill all you little crackers ... Bunch of little faggots w/ your white privlages [sic] fuck you faggots."

In April 2025, the MNPD closed their investigation, concluding in a 48-page report that Hale was motivated by a desire for notoriety. Hale left behind 16 notebooks containing over 1,000 pages of writings expressing a desire to serve as an inspiration for books, documentaries, a museum containing the firearms used in the shooting, as well as further school shootings by others. Hale watched a documentary about school shooters in 2017, and by 2018 had become obsessed with the issue, investigators claimed. Initially inspired by the Columbine massacre, Hale began to rank school shootings, believing that achieving a high kill count and media notoriety would make one a "god".

In diary entries obtained by Megyn Kelly, Hale wrote about wanting to "kill my own race" and "kill all the white children", as well as hatred for the American people. Hale also expressed frustration dealing with autism, OCD, and a late gender transition. The MNPD concluded that the shooting was not motivated by race (though he "frequently raged over these topics"), nor was it motivated by a grudge against the students or staff at The Covenant School. The report stated that Hale targeted the school because he believed that "the Christian faith of those within would make them meek and afraid, which further assuaged Hale's self-doubts. The age of the children and the school being considered a Christian school made [him] recognize the instant notoriety the attack would bring."

== Reactions ==
The Covenant School issued a statement asking for privacy during the law-enforcement investigation. Several vigils were held for the casualties. A memorial at the school gathered items such as flowers, balloons, and stuffed animals. A memorial concert was held at the Fisher Center at Belmont University, with artists including Carrie Underwood, Tyler Hubbard, Colony House, and Thomas Rhett performing. All proceeds benefitted the school's staff, students and families. The city of Nashville set up a fund to support those affected. The Community Foundation of Middle Tennessee also established one for The Covenant School, and GoFundMe created a list with verified similar fundraisers.

Several notable Nashville musicians including Mickey Guyton, Margo Price, and Sheryl Crow offered their condolences and anger about continual school shootings. Actress Melissa Joan Hart, who was nearby when the shooting occurred and helped escort some of the fleeing children to safety, recounted the experience on Instagram a day later. Representative Andy Ogles, whose district includes Nashville, tweeted, "We are sending our thoughts and prayers to the families of those lost. As a father of three, I am utterly heartbroken by this senseless act of violence." Ogles's response was subsequently criticized on social media after a photo of him and his family posing with AR-15s in front of a Christmas tree resurfaced. Arizona gubernatorial press secretary Josselyn Berry tweeted, hours after the shooting, a photo from the film Gloria of the film's protagonist pointing two pistols alongside the text: "Us when we see transphobes." The post was widely condemned, and she resigned two days later. Her former administration said the tweet did not reflect its values.

As a part of a long-running Internet meme, posts misidentifying the shooter using an altered photo of comedian Sam Hyde circulated on social media. A fake manifesto posted anonymously on 4chan was reposted on Twitter. Media praised the Metropolitan Nashville Police Department's response to the tragedy, as responding officers succeeded in ending the shooting just 14 minutes after it was first reported. Actions taken by MNPD officers were reported on in contrast to the significant criticism some Texas police received after the 2022 Uvalde Shooting. On January 3, 2025, President Joe Biden recognized five Nashville police officers (Note: Mike Collazo, Jeff Mathes, Rex Engelbert, Zach Plese, and Ryan Cagle) for their actions by awarding each the Medal of Valor, the highest presidential award for public safety personnel in the United States.

=== Policy debate and protests ===
In response to the shooting, U.S. President Joe Biden said, "We have to do more to stop gun violence. It's ripping our communities apart, ripping the soul of this nation, ripping at the very soul of the nation... we have to do more to protect our schools, so they aren't turned into prisons." He ordered flags on all federal buildings to be flown at half-staff. Nashville Mayor John Cooper called for the state to enact risk-protection laws and take action on gun safety. Tennessee state representative Bob Freeman, a Democrat from Nashville, called for gun reforms in the wake of the shooting.

Protestors called for increased gun control in reaction to the shootings. On March 30, thousands of protestors gathered at the Tennessee State Capitol to call for stricter gun control laws. Some children held signs saying "I'm nine" in reference to the age of the children shot. Within the chamber of the capitol, three state representatives, Justin Jones, Justin Pearson, and Gloria Johnson led the public gallery in chants of "no more silence", "we have to do better", and "gun reform now", demanding that lawmakers strengthen gun laws. This protest delayed a hearing on a bill which would expand gun access. On April 5, thousands of students across the United States demonstrated in a walkout to call on lawmakers to end gun violence. The student group March for Our Lives organized walkouts across Tennessee as well as a march to the State Capitol.

After their actions during the March 30 protest, Johnson and Jones were stripped of their committee assignments and, alongside Pearson, were notified that they could be expelled from the House. House Speaker Cameron Sexton said their actions were unacceptable, breaking rules of decorum and procedure. Jones and Pearson were expelled from the House on April 6, with the vote to expel Johnson failing by a single vote. Within a week, they were reinstated in interim capacities—the Nashville Metropolitan Council unanimously voted to reinstate Jones, and the Shelby County Board of Commissioners unanimously voted to reinstate Pearson. The expulsion and interim reinstatement garnered national attention.

A Trans activist called out the school for abuse calling it a “Right wing institution” that needed to be regulated, allegedly giving the reason why Hale attacked the school. The activist denounced the attack, but said mandating LGBTQ+ friendly curriculum and providing free mental healthcare would prevent more attacks.

Also on April 5, right-wing political activist Charlie Kirk spoke out against gun laws at a Turning Point USA rally, stating, "It's worth to have a cost of, unfortunately, some gun deaths every single year so that we can have the Second Amendment to protect our other God-given rights". He further stated that gun violence could be reduced with having armed guards at schools. Kirk's response was criticized by Shannon Watts, who stated in an email to Newsweek that gun safety laws were essential to saving lives. After Kirk was shot dead on a college campus on September 10, 2025, his statement was reposted numerous times on social media.

The state legislature passed bills designed to improve safety measures at schools. In March, it passed a law allowing private schools to hire school resource officers from police departments to help prevent shootings, effective immediately. In April, the legislature passed a bill allocating $230 million towards school safety, including to place school-resource officers in every school; the bill was signed into law in May. On August 8, 2023, Governor Bill Lee officially called for a special session of the General Assembly to be held on August 21 to focus on public safety in response to the shooting.

=== Controversy over Hale's writings ===
In the immediate aftermath of the shooting, police officers collected what was initially described as a "manifesto" authored by Hale. David Rausch, the director of the Tennessee Bureau of Investigation, later called the descriptor a "mischaracterization", describing the writings as a document detailing Hale's plan and "journal-type rantings". The MNPD denied requests for the files by The Tennessean and state senator Todd Gardenhire, who argued, along with some open-government advocates, that Tennessee's public records laws required the release of the writings. Metro Nashville Council Member Courtney Johnston said that the FBI had told her that the documents would not be released because they detailed a "blueprint of total destruction" and could inspire other shooters. Several Tennessee politicians and public figures—including Elon Musk and Donald Trump Jr.—publicly called for the release of the documents. Senator Bill Hagerty said, "I think people do deserve to know what took place [and] what was in the mind of this sick person that committed these heinous murders." House Republican Caucus Chairman Jeremy Faison attributed the lack of a legislative response to the shootings to the delayed release, saying, "We cannot possibly address this horrific situation until we know what was in [the] manifesto."

On April 28, 2023, Tennessee Governor Bill Lee announced that, per his communications with Drake, the writings would be released "very soon". When the Tennessee Firearms Association, among other organizations, filed suit to obtain the writings, the MNPD announced that, in the face of "pending litigation", it would delay the release on the advice of counsel. The Covenant School sought to intervene in both cases to protect "sensitive information owned by The Covenant School" from being released, and a collection of Covenant parents, representing 75% of the families at the school, sought to provide argument that the writings—even in a redacted form—should not be released at all. A judge granted the requests to intervene by the school and the parents. In March 2024, a federal judge in Tennessee ordered the FBI to hand over the manifesto left behind by the shooter. On May 29, 2025, the FBI released 112 pages from notebooks that had been found in Hale's car. 231 pages were released in June and a further 485 pages were released in August. The full "manifesto" consists of 2,056 pages. On February 4, 2026, the Court of Appeals of Tennessee issued a ruling that required the trial court to proceed in having the documents made available for inspection.

==== Leaks ====
On November 6, 2023, images of three pages of Hale's diary were released by conservative commentator Steven Crowder. Nashville Police chief John Drake confirmed the authenticity of the images, and Nashville mayor Freddie O'Connell directed Nashville's Department of Law to investigate "how these images could have been released". The leaks showed that Hale was hoping for "a high death count" and had a stated desire to "kill little crackers" and "faggots" with "white privilege".

== See also ==
- Annunciation Catholic Church shooting, a similar shooting that took place at a Catholic School
- Antioch High School shooting, a school shooting which also took place in Nashville
- Abundant Life Christian School shooting, a similar shooting that took place at Christian K–12 school
- Gun violence in the United States
- List of mass shootings in the United States in 2023
- List of school shootings in the United States (2000–present)
- List of school shootings in the United States by death toll
- List of filmed mass shootings
