= 2026 United States House of Representatives elections in Tennessee =

- November 3, 2026

All 9 Tennessee seats to the United States House of Representatives
	Majority party	Minority party
Party	Republican	Democratic
Last election	8	1
Seats won	8	1
Seat change	Steady	Steady
Popular vote	1,095,798	896,349
Percentage	53.94%	44.12%
Swing	▼10.45%	▲10.45%

Republican hold Republican gain
Democratic gain
Republican
40–50%
50–60%
60–70%
70–80%
80–90%
Democratic
40–50%
50–60%
60–70%
70–80%

District lines to be used from the 2026 elections, per HB 7003 signed by the Governor of Tennessee on May 7, 2026 Interactive map version

The 2026 United States House of Representatives elections in Tennessee were held on November 3, 2026, to elect the nine U.S. representatives from the State of Tennessee, one from all nine of the state's congressional districts. The elections coincided with other elections to the House of Representatives, elections to the United States Senate, and various state and local elections. Primary elections took place on August 6, 2026.

Following the 2026 elections, two seats changed hands, with the 4th district flipping to Democrat and the 9th district flipping to Republican, leaving the Tennessee delegation at an 8-1 Republican majority.

== Redistricting ==
=== Background ===
On May 6, 2026, Tennessee Republicans released a newly proposed congressional map that would draw out Rep. Steve Cohen (D-TN) of Memphis, that was intended to shift the state's delegation from an 8–1 Republican majority to a 9–0 Republican majority. The map passed both chambers and was signed into law by governor Bill Lee on May 7. The enactment of the new map extended the congressional filing deadline to May 15.

== Overview ==
District	Republican		Democratic		Others		Total		Result
District	Votes	%	Votes	%	Votes	%	Votes	%	Result
District 1								100.00%	Republican hold
District 2								100.00%	Republican hold
District 3								100.00%	Republican hold
District 4								100.00%	Democratic gain
District 5								100.00%	Republican hold
District 6								100.00%	Republican hold
District 7								100.00%	Republican hold
District 8								100.00%	Republican hold
District 9								100.00%	Republican gain
Total	1,095,798	53.94%	896,349	44.12%	39,360	1.94%	2,031,507	100.00%	

Popular vote
Republican	54.94%
Democratic	44.12%
Other	1.94%

House seats
Republican	88.89%
Democratic	11.11%

== District 1 ==
2026 Tennessee's 1st congressional district election
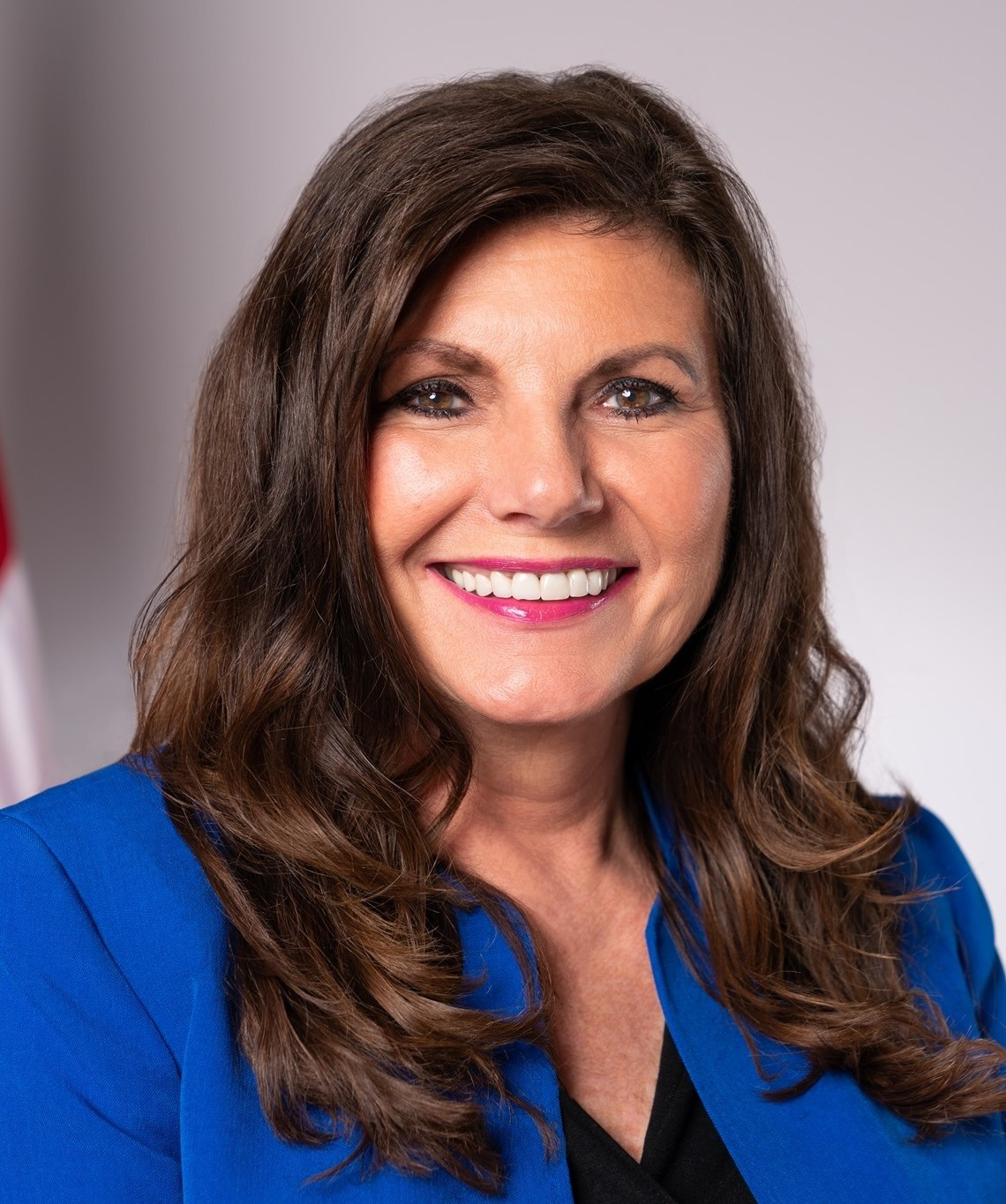

Nominee	Diana Harshbarger	Kristi Burke
Party	Republican	Democratic
Incumbent U.S. Representative
Diana Harshbarger
Republican

Tennessee's 1st congressional district boundary from the 2026 elections Interactive map version

The 1st district is based in northeast Tennessee, encompassing all of Carter, Cocke, Greene, Hamblen, Hancock, Hawkins, Johnson, Sullivan, Unicoi, and Washington counties and parts of Jefferson and Sevier counties, and includes the Tri-Cities region. The incumbent was Republican Diana Harshbarger, who was re-elected with 78.1% of the vote in 2024. Harshbarger won re-election with 67.4% of the vote.

=== Republican primary ===
==== Nominee ====
- Diana Harshbarger, incumbent U.S. representative

==== Endorsements ====
Diana Harshbarger

Executive branch officials

- Donald Trump, president of the United States (2017–2021, 2025–present)

Organizations

- AIPAC
- Freedom Caucus Fund

==== Fundraising ====
Campaign finance reports as of March 31, 2026
Candidate	Raised	Spent	Cash on hand
Diana Harshbarger (R)	$945,558	$591,911	$1,804,416
Source: Federal Election Commission

=== Results ===
Republican primary results
Party	Candidate	Votes	%
Republican	Diana Harshbarger (incumbent)	75,036	100.00%
Total votes		75,036	100.00%

=== Democratic primary ===
==== Nominee ====
- Kristi Burke, artist and YouTuber

==== Eliminated in primary ====
- Herman Garcia, small business owner
- David Kerr, Marine Corps veteran

==== Fundraising ====
Campaign finance reports as of July 17, 2026
Candidate	Raised	Spent	Cash on hand
Kristi Burke (D)	$101,983.51	$87,877.31	$14,106.20
Source: Federal Election Commission

=== Results ===
Democratic primary results by county: Burke: 60–70%; 70–80%; 80–90%

Democratic primary results
Party	Candidate	Votes	%
Democratic	Kristi Burke	12,395	76.63%
Democratic	David Kerr	1,925	11.90%
Democratic	Herman Garcia	1,856	11.47%
Total votes		16,176	100.00%

=== Independent candidates ===
==== Declared ====
- Joshua Ray Ashburn
- Richard G. Baker
- Billy Cody
- Chris Campbell
- Tyler Brice Mitchell McClain

=== General election ===
==== Predictions ====
Source	Ranking	As of
Decision Desk HQ	Safe R	July 14, 2026
The Cook Political Report	Solid R	February 6, 2025
Inside Elections	Solid R	March 7, 2025
Sabato's Crystal Ball	Safe R	August 14, 2025

==== Post-primary endorsements ====
Kristi Burke (D)

Labor unions

- Tennessee AFL-CIO

Organizations

- Track AIPAC

== District 2 ==
2026 Tennessee's 2nd congressional district election
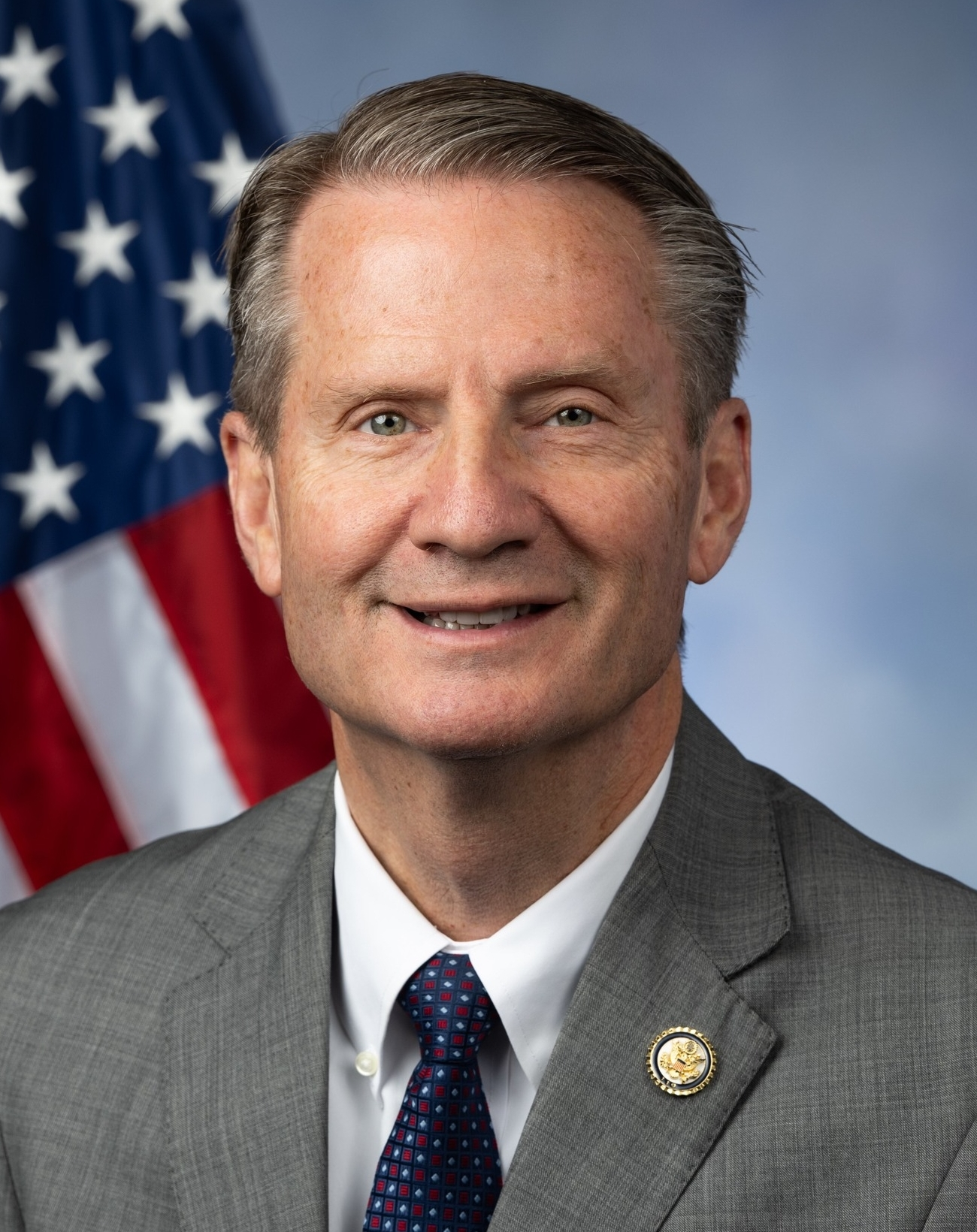

Nominee	Tim Burchett	Michaela Barnett
Party	Republican	Democratic
Popular vote	144,892	103,311
Percentage	57.7%	41.2%
U.S. Representative before election
Tim Burchett
Republican
Elected U.S. Representative
Tim Burchett
Republican

Tennessee's 2nd congressional district boundary from the 2026 elections Interactive map version

The 2nd district is located in East Tennessee, centered on Knoxville and encompassing portions of Blount, Campbell, Claiborne, Grainger, Jefferson, Knox, Loudon, and Union counties. Other notable communities in the district include Maryville, LaFollette, and Lenoir City.

The incumbent was Republican Tim Burchett, who was re-elected with 69.3% of the vote in 2024. Burchett won re-election with 57.7% of the vote.

=== Republican primary ===
==== Nominee ====
- Tim Burchett, incumbent U.S. representative

==== Endorsements ====
Tim Burchett

Executive branch officials

- Donald Trump, president of the United States (2017–2021, 2025–present)

Organizations

- AIPAC

==== Fundraising ====
Campaign finance reports as of March 31, 2026
Candidate	Raised	Spent	Cash on hand
Tim Burchett (R)	$1,161,955	$956,393	$933,753
Source: Federal Election Commission

==== Results ====
Republican primary results
Party	Candidate	Votes	%
Republican	Tim Burchett (incumbent)	86,194	100.00%
Total votes		86,194	100.00%

=== Democratic primary ===
==== Nominee ====
- Michaela Barnett, political organizer and small business owner

==== Fundraising ====
Campaign finance reports as of March 31, 2026
Candidate	Raised	Spent	Cash on hand
Michaela Barnett (D)	$190,931	$159,963	$30,968
Source: Federal Election Commission

==== Results ====
Democratic primary results
Party	Candidate	Votes	%
Democratic	Michaela Barnett	38,892	100.00%
Total votes		38,892	100.00%

=== Independent candidates ===
==== Declared ====
- Bruce Fine
- Adam Heimerman

=== General election ===
==== Predictions ====
Source	Ranking	As of
Decision Desk HQ	Safe R	July 14, 2026
The Cook Political Report	Solid R	February 6, 2025
Inside Elections	Solid R	March 7, 2025
Sabato's Crystal Ball	Safe R	August 14, 2025

==== Post-primary endorsements ====
Michaela Barnett (D)

Labor unions

- Tennessee AFL-CIO

Organizations

- National Women's Political Caucus

== District 3 ==
2026 Tennessee's 3rd congressional district election
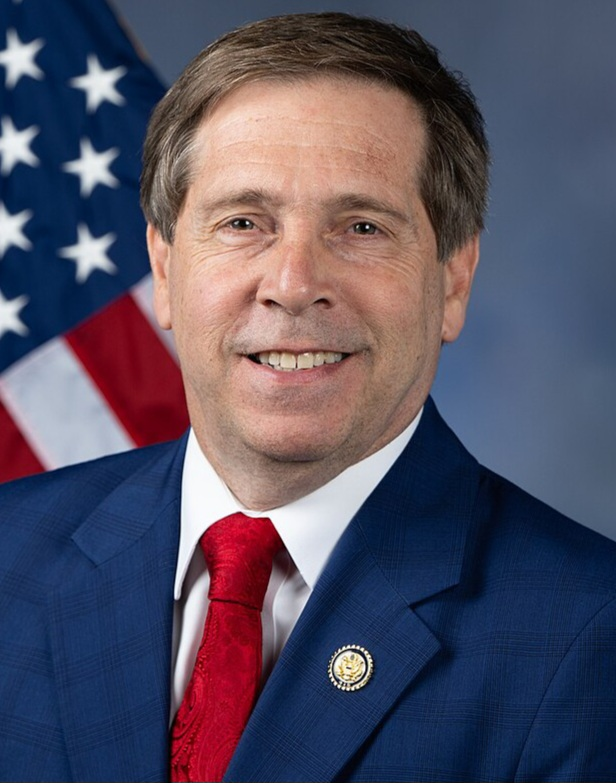

Nominee	Chuck Fleischmann	Anna Golladay
Party	Republican	Democratic
Popular vote	136,110	95,051
Percentage	57.59%	40.21%
U.S. Representative before election
Chuck Fleischmann
Republican
Elected U.S. Representative
Chuck Fleischmann
Republican

Tennessee's 3rd congressional district boundary from the 2026 elections Interactive map version

The 3rd district is centered on the Chattanooga metropolitan area in southeastern Tennessee, extending northward into portions of the Knoxville metropolitan area. It encompasses all of Anderson, Bradley, Hamilton, McMinn, Meigs, Monroe, Polk, and Roane counties, as well as most of Rhea County. Notable communities in the district include Chattanooga, Cleveland, Athens, Dayton, Kingston, and Oak Ridge.

The incumbent was Republican Chuck Fleischmann, who was re-elected with 67.5% of the vote in 2024. Fleischmann won re-election with 57.6% of the vote.

=== Republican primary ===
==== Nominee ====
- Chuck Fleischmann, incumbent U.S. representative

==== Endorsements ====
Chuck Fleischmann

Executive branch officials

- Donald Trump, president of the United States (2017–2021, 2025–present)

Organizations

- AIPAC

==== Fundraising ====
Campaign finance reports as of June 30, 2026
Candidate	Raised	Spent	Cash on hand
Chuck Fleischmann (R)	$2,319,124	$737,753	$4,838,423
Source: Federal Election Commission

==== Results ====
Republican primary results
Party	Candidate	Votes	%
Republican	Chuck Fleischmann (incumbent)	76,463	100.00%
Write-in		1	0.00%
Total votes		76,464	100.00%

=== Democratic primary ===
==== Nominee ====
- Anna Golladay, small business owner

==== Eliminated in primary ====
- Bryan Martin

==== Fundraising ====
Campaign finance reports as of July 17 2026
Candidate	Raised	Spent	Cash on hand
Anna Golladay (D)	$55,554.79	$28,351.80	$33,870.46
Source: Federal Election Commission

==== Results ====
Democratic primary results by county: Golladay: 60–70%; 70–80%; 80–90%

Democratic primary results
Party	Candidate	Votes	%
Democratic	Anna Golladay	27,735	79.57%
Democratic	Bryan Martin	7,120	20.43%
Total votes		34,855	100.00%

=== Independent candidates ===
==== Declared ====
- Dean Arnold
- Jean Howard-Hill
- Rodney Joe King
- Donnie Lynn Ownby
- Edward John Roland

=== General election ===
==== Predictions ====
Source	Ranking	As of
Decision Desk HQ	Safe R	July 14, 2026
The Cook Political Report	Solid R	February 6, 2025
Inside Elections	Solid R	March 7, 2025
Sabato's Crystal Ball	Safe R	August 14, 2025

== District 4 ==
2026 Tennessee's 4th congressional district election

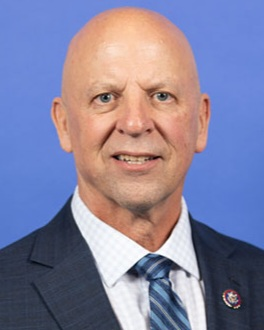
Nominee	Victoria Broderick	Scott DesJarlais
Party	Democratic	Republican
Popular vote	95,585	95,308
Percentage	48.87%	48.73%
- County results Broderick: 40–50% 70–80% DesJarlais: 60–70% 70–80%
U.S. Representative before election
Scott DesJarlais
Republican
Elected U.S. Representative
Victoria Broderick
Democratic

Tennessee's 4th congressional district boundary from the 2026 elections Interactive map version

The 4th district encompasses portions of Middle Tennessee and extends into southeastern Tennessee. It includes a portion of Davidson County, most of Rutherford County, and all of Cannon, Warren, Van Buren, Bledsoe, Sequatchie, Marion, Grundy, Coffee, and Franklin counties. Notable communities in the district include Murfreesboro, Tullahoma, McMinnville, Manchester, and Winchester.

The incumbent was Republican Scott DesJarlais, who was re-elected with 70.0% of the vote in 2024. DesJarlais was defeated in the general election by Democratic nominee Victoria Broderick, who received 48.9% of the vote to his 48.7%, a margin of 280 votes. This result was a massive upset, as all analysts had rated this as a safe seat for Republicans. The results remain unofficial pending certification.

=== Republican primary ===
==== Nominee ====
- Scott DesJarlais, incumbent U.S. representative

==== Eliminated in primary ====
- Tom Davis, army veteran and candidate for this district in 2024
- Joshua James, Rutherford County commissioner and candidate for this seat in 2024
- Harold "Rocky" Jones, U.S. Air Force veteran and volunteer firefighter

==== Disqualified ====
- Robert Arnold, former sheriff of Rutherford County (2010–2017)

==== Endorsements ====
Scott DesJarlais

Executive branch officials

- Donald Trump, president of the United States (2017–2021, 2025–present)

Organizations

- AIPAC
- Freedom Caucus Fund

==== Fundraising ====
Campaign finance reports as of July 17, 2026
Candidate	Raised	Spent	Cash on hand
Tom Davis (R)	$17,964.94	$16,779.85	$3,398.73
Scott DesJarlais (R)	$536,842.93	$407,735.16	$495,126.13
Joshua James (R)	$3,612.51	$3,051.52	$560.99
Source: Federal Election Commission

==== Results ====
Republican primary results by county: DesJarlais: 50–60%; 60–70%; 70–80%

Republican primary results
Party	Candidate	Votes	%
Republican	Scott DesJarlais (incumbent)	39,503	65.90%
Republican	Tom Davis	9,781	16.32%
Republican	Harold "Rocky" Jones	6,065	10.12%
Republican	Joshua James	4,598	7.67%
Total votes		59,947	100.00%

=== Democratic primary ===
==== Nominee ====
- Victoria Broderick, telemarketer and nominee for the seat in 2024

==== Eliminated in primary ====
- Mike Cortese, Nashville Metro councilmember
- Cliff Huffman, retired nurse practitioner
- Tim Lanier, carpenter
- Joyce E. Neal, professor

==== Disqualified ====
- Patrick Larson
- Jacob Anders, author and historian

==== Endorsements ====
Victoria Broderick

Organizations

- Center for Freethought Equality

==== Fundraising ====
Campaign finance reports as of July 17, 2026
Candidate	Raised	Spent	Cash on hand
Victoria Broderick (D)	$42,165	$45,914	$3,943
Mike Cortese (D)	$741,733.20	$619,475.47	$122,257.73
Tim Lanier (D)	$13,593.99	$10,613.95	$2,980.04
Joyce Neal (D)	$8,310.00	$7,396.28	$768.80
Source: Federal Election Commission

==== Results ====
Democratic primary results by county: Broderick: 30–40%; 40–50%; Cortese: 20–30%; 30–40%

Democratic primary results
Party	Candidate	Votes	%
Democratic	Victoria Broderick	12,432	37.87%
Democratic	Mike Cortese	9,226	28.11%
Democratic	Joyce Neal	7,230	22.03%
Democratic	Tim Lanier	2,458	7.49%
Democratic	Cliff Huffman	1,480	4.51%
Total votes		32,826	100.00%

=== Independent candidates ===
==== Declared ====
- Jacob Anders, author and historian
- Clay Faircloth, pastor

==== Endorsements ====
Jacob Anders

Political parties

- Green Party
- Transhumanist Party
- Unity Party
- Forward Party of Tennessee

==== Fundraising ====
Campaign finance reports as of July 17, 2026
Candidate	Raised	Spent	Cash on hand
Jacob Anders (I)	$27,150.00	$383.88	$26,766.12
Source: Federal Election Commission

=== General election ===
==== Predictions ====
Source	Ranking	As of
Decision Desk HQ	Safe R	July 14, 2026
The Cook Political Report	Solid R	February 6, 2025
Inside Elections	Solid R	March 7, 2025
Sabato's Crystal Ball	Safe R	August 14, 2025

==== Post-primary endorsements ====
Victoria Broderick (D)

Labor unions

- Tennessee AFL-CIO

Organizations

- National Women's Political Caucus

==== Fundraising ====
Campaign finance reports as of October 14, 2026
Candidate	Raised	Spent	Cash on hand
Scott DesJarlais (R)	$667,181	$508,166	$525,034
Victoria Broderick (D)	$94,217	$90,062	$11,848
Source: Federal Election Commission

== District 5 ==
2026 Tennessee's 5th congressional district election

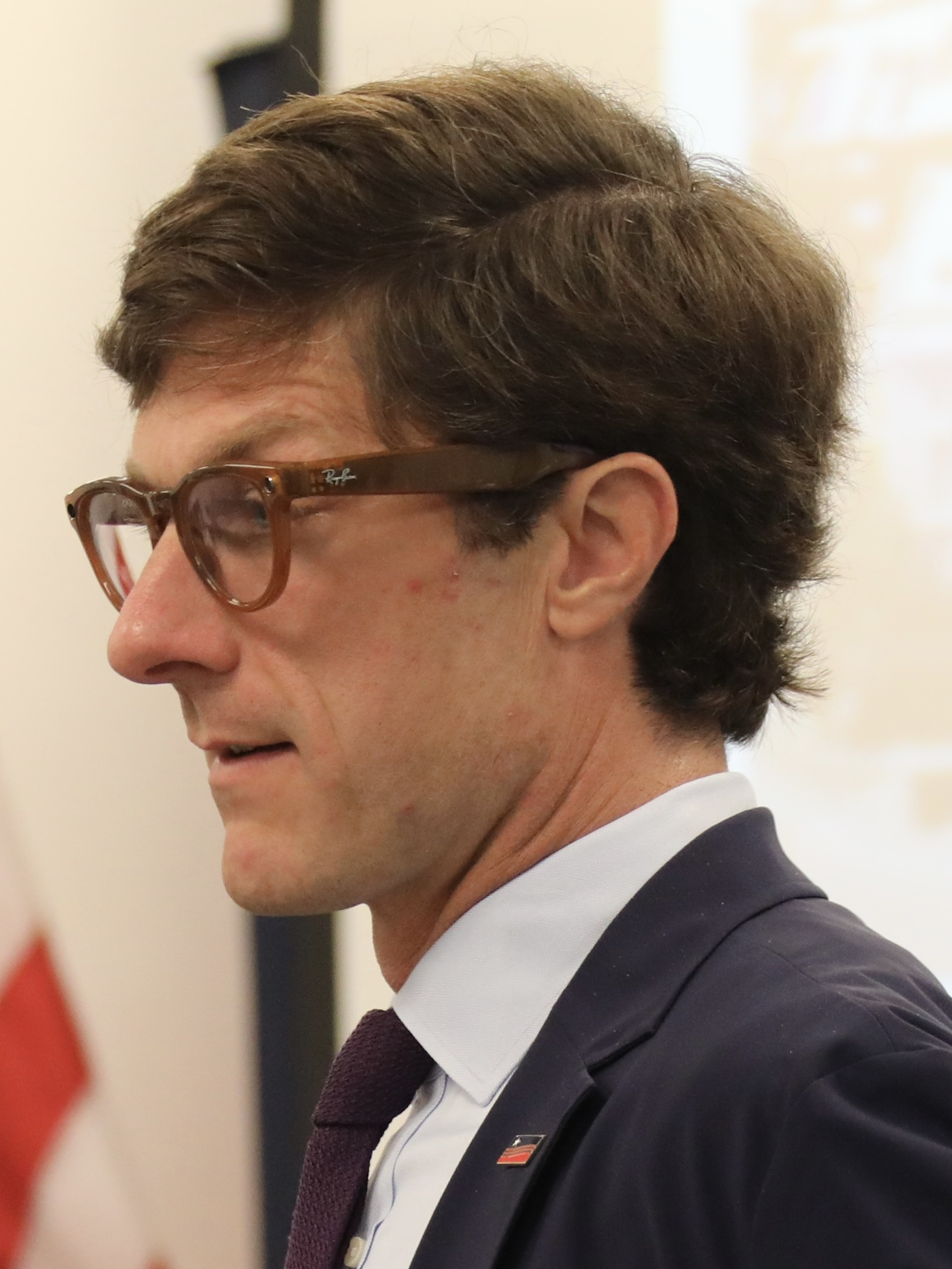
Nominee	Charlie Hatcher	Chaz Molder
Party	Republican	Democratic
Popular vote	110,408	99,841
Percentage	51.66%	46.72%
- Hatcher: 50–60% 60–70% 70–80% Molder: 60–70% 80–90%
U.S. Representative before election
Andy Ogles
Republican
Elected U.S. Representative
Charlie Hatcher
Republican

Tennessee's 5th congressional district boundary from the 2026 elections Interactive map version

The 5th district stretches across West Tennessee and portions of Middle Tennessee, extending from Memphis northward along the Mississippi River and eastward into the Nashville metropolitan area. The district includes portions of Shelby, Tipton, Montgomery, Maury, and Williamson counties, as well as all of Benton, Dyer, Henry, Hickman, Houston, Humphreys, Lake, Lauderdale, Lewis, Obion, Stewart, and Weakley counties. Notable communities within the district include portions of Memphis, Dyersburg, Union City, and Paris. The district also includes the Tennessee portion of Fort Campbell.

The incumbent was Republican Andy Ogles, who was re-elected with 56.9% of the vote in 2024. Ogles lost the Republican primary in August 2026 to former Tennessee agriculture commissioner Charlie Hatcher, who received 53.2% of the vote to Ogles's 46.8%. Hatcher subsequently won the general election, defeating Democratic nominee Chaz Molder, the mayor of Columbia, with 51.7% of the vote to Molder's 46.7%.

=== Republican primary ===
==== Nominee ====
- Charlie Hatcher, former Tennessee Commissioner of Agriculture (2019–2025)

==== Eliminated in primary ====
- Andy Ogles, incumbent U.S. representative

==== Disqualified ====
- Patrick Smith

==== Endorsements ====
Andy Ogles

Executive branch officials

- Donald Trump, president of the United States (2017–2021, 2025–present)

U.S. senators

- Marsha Blackburn, Tennessee (2019–present)
- Bill Hagerty, Tennessee (2021–present)

U.S. representatives

- Mike Johnson, speaker of the House (2023–present) from LA-04 (2017–present)
- Steve Scalise, majority leader of the House (2023–present) from LA-02 (2008–present)

State legislators

- Gino Bulso, state representative from the 61st district (2023–present)

Organizations

- AIPAC
- Freedom Caucus Fund
Charlie Hatcher

Executive branch officials

- Sonny Perdue, U.S. Secretary of Agriculture (2017–2021) and governor of Georgia (2003–2011)

Statewide officials

- Bill Haslam, former governor of Tennessee (2011-2019), mayor of Knoxville (2003-2011) and owner of Nashville Predators
- Bill Lee, governor of Tennessee (2019–present)

U.S. representatives

- Zach Wamp, former TN-03 (1995–2011)

State legislators

- John Stevens, state senator from the 24th district (2013–present)

==== Fundraising ====
Campaign finance reports as of July 17, 2026
Candidate	Raised	Spent	Cash on hand
Charlie Hatcher (R)	$719,503	$614,682	$104,821
Andy Ogles (R)	$613,135	$617,407	$57,649
Source: Federal Election Commission

==== Polling ====
Poll source	Date(s) administered	Sample size (Note: Key: A – all adults RV – registered voters LV – likely voters V – unclear)	Margin of error	Charlie Hatcher	Andy Ogles	Undecided
Tusk Strategies (Note: Commissioned by Invest in Tomorrow Coalition, an anti-Ogles super PAC)	July 26–28, 2026	400 (LV)	± 5.0%	33%	37%	30%

==== Results ====
Republican primary results by county: Hatcher: 50–60%; 60–70%; Ogles: 50–60%; 60–70%

Republican primary results
Party	Candidate	Votes	%
Republican	Charlie Hatcher	36,546	53.24%
Republican	Andy Ogles (incumbent)	32,096	46.76%
Total votes		68,642	100.00%

=== Democratic primary ===
==== Nominee ====
- Chaz Molder, mayor of Columbia (2018–present)

==== Eliminated in primary ====
- Yolanda Cooper-Sutton, Memphis City Councilmember
- DeVante R. Hill
- Rachel Hurley, writer
- Carrie Ann Iacomini, former educator

==== Withdrawn ====
- Mike Cortese, Nashville Metro councilmember (running in the fourth district)
- Joyce Neal, adjunct professor (running in the fourth district)
- James Torino, healthcare executive (running in the ninth district)

==== Endorsements ====
Chaz Molder

U.S. representatives

- Steve Cohen, TN-09 (2007–present)
- Jim Cooper, former TN-05 (1983–1995, 2003–2023)
- Suzan DelBene, WA-01 (2012–present)
- John Tanner, former TN-08 (1989–2011)

Statewide officials

- Phil Bredesen, former governor of Tennessee (2003–2011)

State legislators

- Raumesh Akbari, state senator from the 29th district (2019–present)

Organizations

- DCCC Red to Blue

==== Fundraising ====
Campaign finance reports as of March 31, 2026
Candidate	Raised	Spent	Cash on hand
Mike Cortese (D)	$533,689	$383,404	$150,285
Chaz Molder (D)	$1,825,648	$551,473	$1,274,175
Joyce Neal (D)	$6,615	$3,217	$1,543
James Torino (D)	$117,034	$17,349	$99,685
Source: Federal Election Commission

==== Results ====
Democratic primary results by county: Molder: 20–30%; 30–40%; 40–50%; 50–60%; 70–80%; Cooper-Sutton: 30–40%; 40–50%; 50–60%; Hurley: 30–40%; Hill: 30–40%; Tie: 30–40%

Democratic primary results
Party	Candidate	Votes	%
Democratic	Chaz Molder	17,730	40.51%
Democratic	Yolanda Cooper-Sutton	14,362	32.82%
Democratic	Rachel Hurley	4,857	11.11%
Democratic	DeVante R. Hill	4,324	9.88%
Democratic	Carrie Ann Iacomini	2,491	5.69%
Total votes		43,764	100.00%

=== Independent candidates ===
==== Declared ====
- James A. Johnson
- Micheál (Me-Haul) O'Leary

==== Withdrawn ====
- Lowell Andre Reynolds, music producer and audio engineer (running in the seventh district)

=== General election ===
==== Predictions ====
Source	Ranking	As of
Decision Desk HQ	Safe R	September 8, 2026
The Cook Political Report	Solid R	May 8, 2026
Inside Elections	Solid R	May 8, 2026
Sabato's Crystal Ball	Likely R	November 2, 2026

==== Post-primary endorsements ====
Charlie Hatcher (R)

Executive branch officials

- Donald Trump, president of the United States (2017–2021, 2025–present)
Chaz Molder (D)

U.S. representatives

- Adam Gray, CA-13 (2025–present)

Labor unions

- American Federation of Government Employees
- National Education Association
- Tennessee AFL-CIO
- United Auto Workers

Organizations

- Blue Dog PAC
- Democratic Majority for Israel

==== Polling ====
Poll source	Date(s) administered	Sample size	Margin of error	Charlie Hatcher (R)	Chaz Molder (D)	Undecided
Impact Research (D) (Note: Poll sponsored by Molder's campaign)	September 28 – October 1, 2026	552 (LV)	± 4.2%	46%	41%	11%
Impact Research (D)	August 19–24, 2026	500 (LV)	± 4.4%	48%	40%	12%

Hypothetical polling

Andy Ogles vs. Chaz Molder

Poll source	Date(s) administered	Sample size	Margin of error	Andy Ogles (R)	Chaz Molder (D)	Undecided
Impact Research (D)	May 11–13, 2026	558 (LV)	± 4.1%	47%	41%	12%

== District 6 ==
2026 Tennessee's 6th congressional district election
Nominee	Johnny Garrett	Mike Croley
Party	Republican	Democratic
Popular vote	120,950	113,177
Percentage	50.77%	47.51%
- Garrett: 50–60% 60–70% 70–80% 80–90% Croley: 70–80%
U.S. Representative before election
John Rose
Republican
Elected U.S. Representative
Johnny Garrett
Republican

Tennessee's 6th congressional district boundary from the 2026 elections Interactive map version

The 6th district is centered in Middle Tennessee, encompassing the eastern suburbs of Nashville and extending eastward across the Cumberland Plateau into portions of East Tennessee. The district includes communities such as Gallatin, Lebanon, Cookeville, and Crossville, as well as a small portion of Hendersonville, and extends northward to Scott County.

The incumbent was Republican John Rose, who represented the district from 2019 to 2027. Rose did not seek re-election in 2026, instead running for governor. Republican Johnny Garrett won the 2026 general election, defeating Democratic nominee Mike Croley with 50.8% of the vote to Croley's 47.5%.

=== Republican primary ===
==== Nominee ====
- Johnny Garrett, state representative from the 45th district (2019–present)

==== Eliminated in primary ====
- Natisha Brooks, educator and candidate for mayor of Nashville in 2023
- Jon Henry
- Van Hilleary, chief of staff to incumbent John Rose, former U.S. representative from the 4th district (1995–2003), nominee for governor in 2002, and candidate for U.S. Senate in 2006

==== Declined ====
- John Rose, incumbent U.S. representative (ran for governor)

==== Endorsements ====
Johnny Garrett

U.S. representatives

- Tom Emmer, House majority whip (2023–present) from MN-06 (2015–present)
- Steve Scalise, House majority leader (2023–present) from LA-01 (2008–present)
- Jason Smith, MO-08 (2013–present)

Local officials

- Glenn Jacobs, Knox County mayor (2018–present)

Individuals

- Riley Gaines, conservative activist and former college athlete
John Henry

Executive branch officials

- Michael Flynn, former national security advisor (2017)
Van Hilleary

U.S. representatives

- Robert Aderholt, AL-04 (1997–present)
- Brett Guthrie, KY-02 (2009–present)
- Trent Kelly, MS-01 (2015–present)
- Mike Rogers, AL-03 (2003–present)
- Joe Wilson, SC-02 (2001–present)

State legislators

- Paul Bailey, state senator from the 15th district (2015–present)

==== Fundraising ====
Campaign finance reports as of June 30, 2026
Candidate	Raised	Spent	Cash on hand
Johnny Garrett (R)	$2,314,281	$1,533,848	$780,433
Jon Henry (R)	$67,166	$17,827	$99,749
Van Hilleary (R)	$1,502,905	$550,719	$952,186
Source: Federal Election Commission

==== Results ====
Republican primary results by county: Garrett: 30–40%; 40–50%; 50–60%; 60–70%; Hilleary: 30–40%; 50–60%; Henry: 60–70%

Republican primary results
Party	Candidate	Votes	%
Republican	Johnny Garrett	37,388	43.63%
Republican	Van Hilleary	25,490	29.75%
Republican	Jon Henry	16,792	19.60%
Republican	Natisha Brooks	6,016	7.02%
Total votes		85,686	100.00%

=== Democratic primary ===
==== Nominee ====
- Mike Croley, former park ranger

==== Eliminated in primary ====
- Lore Bergman, community organizer and nominee for this district in 2024
- Christopher Martin Finley
- Miriam Leibowitz
- Chaney Mosley, agriculture professor at Middle Tennessee State University

==== Not on ballot ====
- Megan Barry, former mayor of Nashville (2015–2018) and nominee for Tennessee's 7th congressional district in 2024

==== Fundraising ====
Campaign finance reports as of March 31, 2026
Candidate	Raised	Spent	Cash on hand
Mike Croley (D)	$14,730	$8,462	$6,328
Chaney Mosley (D)	$52,595	$9,870	$42,725
Source: Federal Election Commission

==== Results ====
Democratic primary results by county: Croley: 20–30%; 30–40%; 40–50%; 50–60%; Mosley: 30–40%; Bergman: 20–30%

Democratic primary results
Party	Candidate	Votes	%
Democratic	Mike Croley	11,604	28.90%
Democratic	Chaney Mosley	9,633	23.99%
Democratic	Lore Bergman	9,224	22.97%
Democratic	Miriam Leibowitz	6,840	17.03%
Democratic	Christopher Martin Finley	2,856	7.11%
Total votes		40,157	100.00%

=== Independent candidates ===
==== Declared ====
- Chris Monday, graphic designer, Republican candidate for this seat in 2018 and independent candidate for this seat in 2020
- Angus Purdy

==== Withdrawn ====
- Andrew Koontz, real estate agent (running in the seventh district)

==== Fundraising ====
Campaign finance reports as of March 31, 2026
Candidate	Raised	Spent	Cash on hand
Andrew Koontz (I)	$5,100	$130	$4,970
Source: Federal Election Commission

=== General election ===
==== Predictions ====
Source	Ranking	As of
Decision Desk HQ	Safe R	July 14, 2026
The Cook Political Report	Solid R	February 6, 2025
Inside Elections	Solid R	March 7, 2025
Sabato's Crystal Ball	Safe R	August 14, 2025

==== Post-primary endorsements ====
Mike Croley (D)

Labor unions

- Tennessee AFL-CIO
- United Auto Workers

== District 7 ==
2026 Tennessee's 7th congressional district election
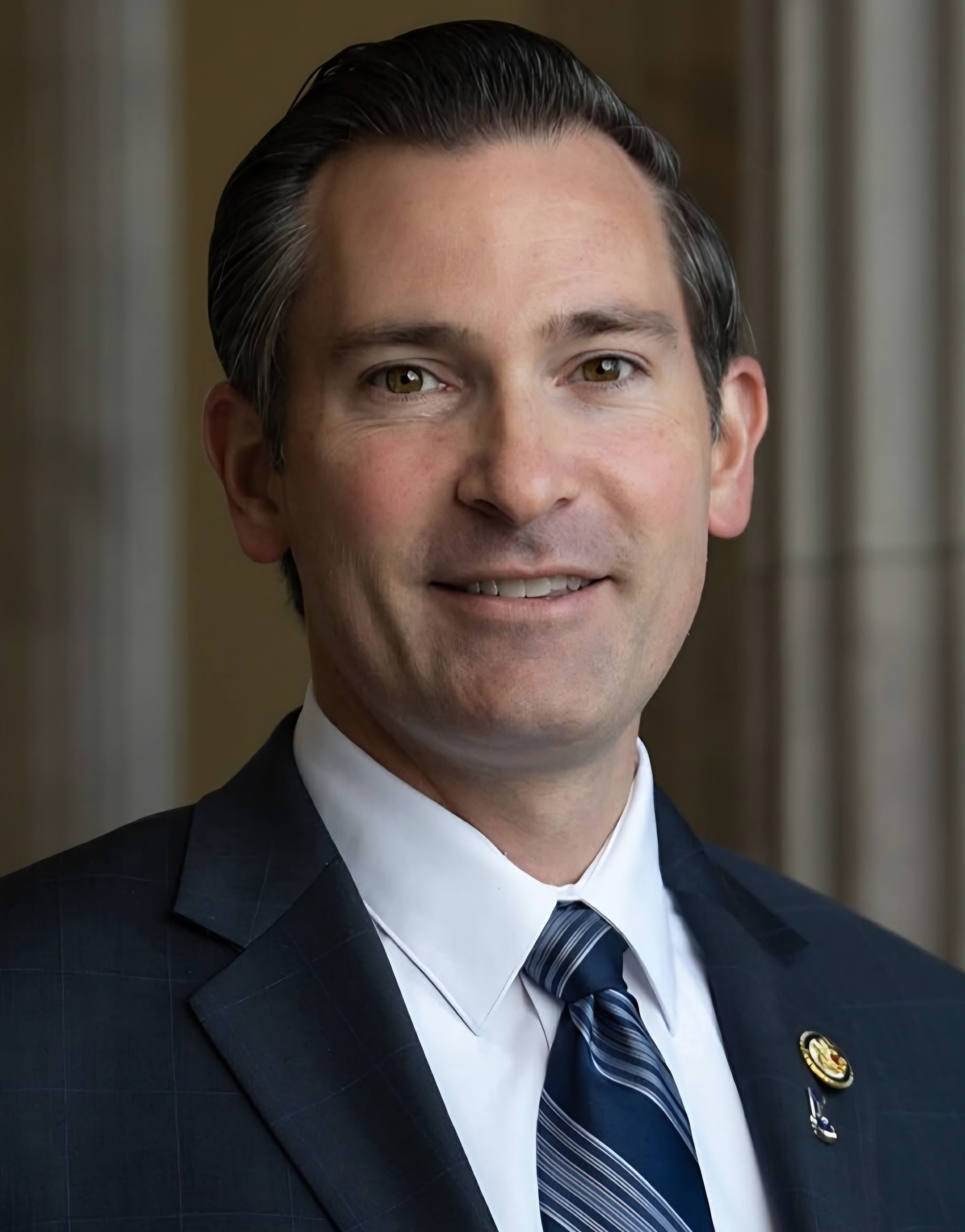

Nominee	Matt Van Epps	Darden Copeland
Party	Republican	Democratic
Popular vote	121,100	115,867
Percentage	50.27%	48.10%
- Van Epps: 50–60% 60–70% 70–80% Copeland: 60–70%
U.S. Representative before election
Matt Van Epps
Republican
Elected U.S. Representative
Matt Van Epps
Republican

Tennessee's 7th congressional district boundary from the 2026 elections Interactive map version

The 7th district is centered in Middle Tennessee, anchored by significant portions of Nashville and its surrounding northern and western suburbs. The district encompasses portions of Davidson and Montgomery counties, as well as all of Cheatham, Dickson, Robertson, Sumner, Macon, and Trousdale counties. It includes communities such as Ashland City, Pleasant View, Dickson, Springfield, Clarksville, Gallatin, and Hendersonville.

The district was substantially redrawn in May 2026 as part of Tennessee's mid-decade congressional redistricting, replacing its previous configuration, which extended southward toward the Alabama border. The new boundaries were adopted by the Tennessee General Assembly on May 7, 2026, and took effect for the 2026 congressional elections.

The incumbent was Republican Matt Van Epps, who won a special election following the resignation of Republican Mark Green with 53.9% of the vote. He was subsequently re-elected to a full term, narrowly defeating Democratic nominee Darden Copeland with 50.3% of the vote to Copeland's 48.1%.

=== Republican primary ===
==== Nominee ====
- Matt Van Epps, incumbent U.S. representative

==== Disqualified ====
- Brant Hall

==== Endorsements ====
Matt Van Epps

Executive branch officials

- Donald Trump, president of the United States (2017–2021, 2025–present)

==== Fundraising ====
Campaign finance reports as of March 31, 2026
Candidate	Raised	Spent	Cash on hand
Matt Van Epps (R)	$1,982,057	$1,846,902	$135,155
Source: Federal Election Commission

==== Results ====
Republican primary results
Party	Candidate	Votes	%
Republican	Matt Van Epps (incumbent)	60,043	100.00%
Total votes		60,043	100.00%

=== Democratic primary ===
==== Nominee ====
- Darden Copeland, consultant and candidate for this district in 2025

==== Eliminated in primary ====
- Vincent Dixie, state representative from the 54th district (2019–present) and candidate for this district in 2025 (previously withdrew)
- Saletta Holloway, former member of the Metropolitan Council of Nashville and Davidson County
- Joshua Warren Sales, teacher

==== Declined ====
- Aftyn Behn, state representative from the 51st district (2023–present) and nominee for this district in 2025 (ran for re-election)

==== Fundraising ====
Campaign finance reports as of December 31, 2025
Candidate	Raised	Spent	Cash on hand
Vincent Dixie (D)	$177,458	$176,124	$1,333
Source: Federal Election Commission

==== Results ====
Democratic primary results by county: Copeland: 30–40%; 40–50%; 50–60%

Democratic primary results
Party	Candidate	Votes	%
Democratic	Darden Copeland	16,646	39.82%
Democratic	Vincent Dixie	11,387	27.24%
Democratic	Saletta Holloway	9,985	23.89%
Democratic	Joshua Warren Sales	3,745	8.96%
Write-in	Lore Bergman	37	0.09%
Total votes		41,800	100.00%

=== Independent candidates ===
==== Declared ====
- Andrew J. Koontz
- Lowell Reynolds

==== Did not file ====
- Terri Christie, boat captain and candidate in the 2025 special election
- Jonathan Thorp, commercial helicopter pilot and candidate in the 2025 special election

==== Fundraising ====
Campaign finance reports as of December 31, 2025
Candidate	Raised	Spent	Cash on hand
Jonathan Thorp (I)	$20,099	$26,337	$0
Source: Federal Election Commission

=== General election ===
==== Predictions ====
Source	Ranking	As of
Decision Desk HQ	Likely R	November 3, 2026
The Cook Political Report	Solid R	February 6, 2025
Inside Elections	Solid R	March 7, 2025
Sabato's Crystal Ball	Safe R	December 3, 2025

== District 8 ==
2026 Tennessee's 8th congressional district election
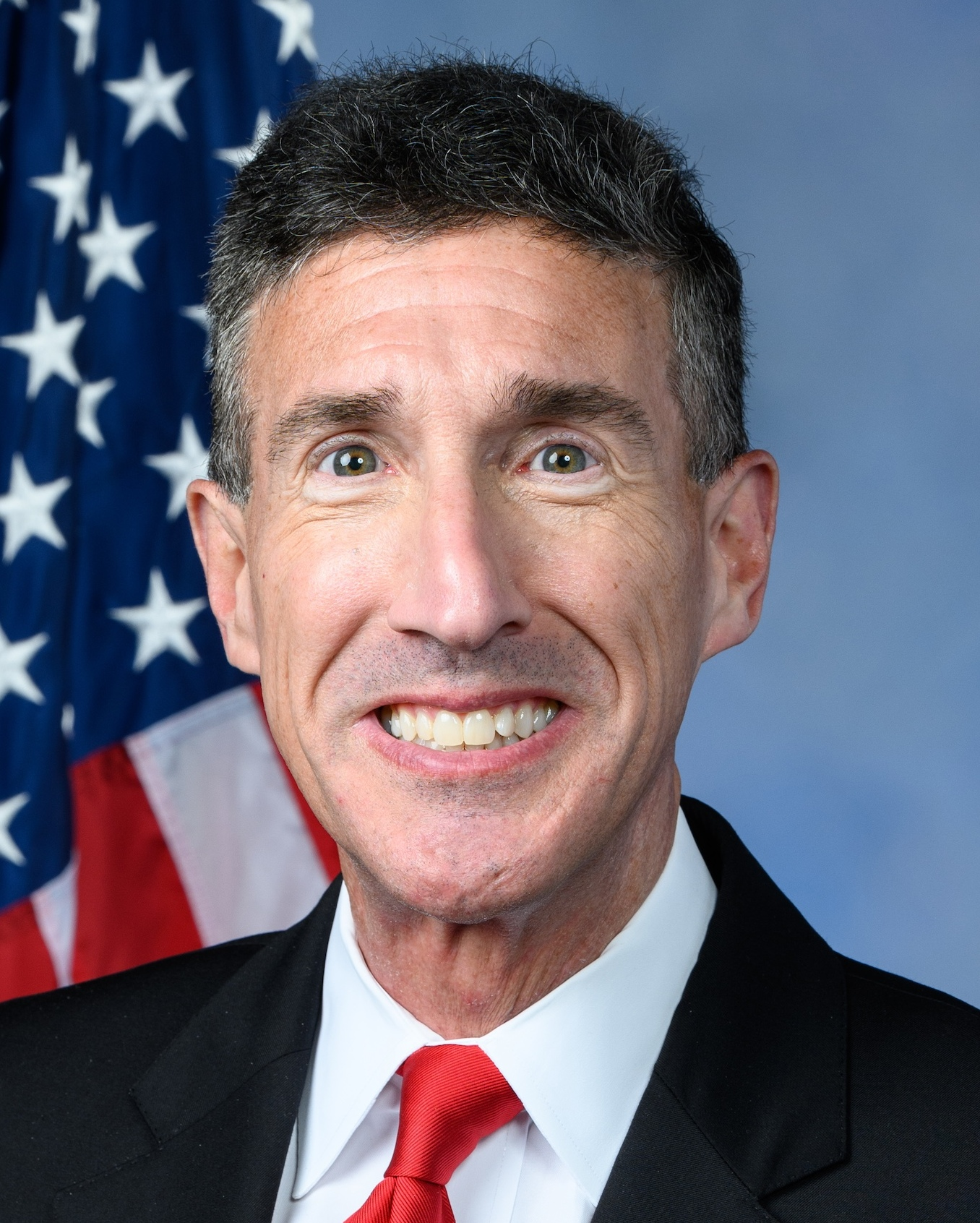

Nominee	David Kustoff	Heidi Kuhn
Party	Republican	Democratic
Popular vote	114,045	102,406
Percentage	51.63%	46.36%
- Kustoff: 50–60% 60–70% 70–80% Kuhn: 50–60%
U.S. Representative before election
David Kustoff
Republican
Elected U.S. Representative
David Kustoff
Republican

Tennessee's 8th congressional district boundary from the 2026 elections Interactive map version

The 8th district is centered in West Tennessee, encompassing a large portion of the region's rural communities as well as significant portions of Memphis and its eastern suburbs. The district includes portions of Shelby, Fayette, and Tipton counties, along with all of Carroll, Chester, Crockett, Decatur, Gibson, Haywood, Henderson, Madison, and Perry counties. It includes communities such as Jackson, Bartlett, Germantown, Collierville, Lakeland, and Arlington.

The incumbent was Republican David Kustoff, who was re-elected to a sixth term, defeating Democratic nominee Heidi Kuhn with 51.6% of the vote to Kuhn's 46.4%.

=== Republican primary ===
==== Nominee ====
- David Kustoff, incumbent U.S. representative

==== Endorsements ====
David Kustoff

Executive branch officials

- Donald Trump, president of the United States (2017–2021, 2025–present)

Organizations

- AIPAC
- Republican Jewish Coalition

==== Fundraising ====
Campaign finance reports as of May 31, 2026
Candidate	Raised	Spent	Cash on hand
David Kustoff (R)	$1,813,311	$1,041,265	$2,831,507
Source: Federal Election Commission

==== Results ====
Republican primary results
Party	Candidate	Votes	%
Republican	David Kustoff (incumbent)	65,431	100.00%
Total votes		65,431	100.00%

=== Democratic primary ===
==== Nominee ====
- Heidi Kuhn, Shelby County Criminal Court clerk

==== Eliminated in primary ====
- Dewey Gordon Bryan
- Jordan D. Hinders
- Leonard Perkins, retired USAF air traffic controller

==== Endorsements ====
Heidi Kuhn

U.S. Representatives

- Steve Cohen, TN-09 (2007–present)

==== Results ====
Democratic primary results by county: Kuhn: 30–40%; 40–50%; 50–60%; Bryan: 40–50%; Perkins: 40–50%; 50–60%

Democratic primary results
Party	Candidate	Votes	%
Democratic	Heidi Kuhn	23,787	51.95%
Democratic	Dewey Gordon Bryan	9,611	20.99%
Democratic	Leonard Perkins	7,719	16.86%
Democratic	Jordan D. Hinders	4,671	10.20%
Total votes		45,788	100.00%

=== Independent candidates ===
==== Declared ====
- Adam D. Austill
- Wendell "Wells" Blankenship
- Antonio Futch
- Pamela Jeanine "P." Moses
- Horace Taylor
- Henry J. Ward II

=== General election ===
==== Predictions ====
Source	Ranking	As of
Decision Desk HQ	Safe R	July 14, 2026
The Cook Political Report	Solid R	February 6, 2025
Inside Elections	Solid R	March 7, 2025
Sabato's Crystal Ball	Safe R	August 14, 2025

==== Post-primary endorsements ====
Heidi Kuhn (D)

Labor unions

- Tennessee AFL-CIO

Organizations

- National Women's Political Caucus

== District 9 ==
2026 Tennessee's 9th congressional district election
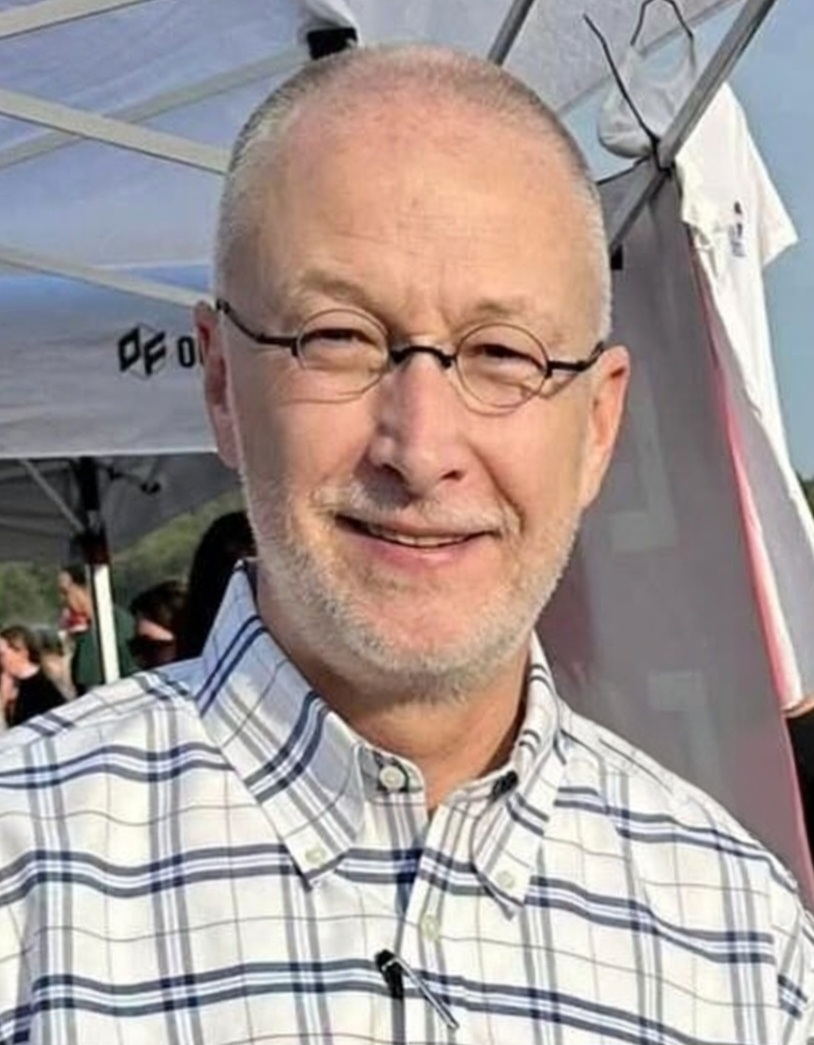

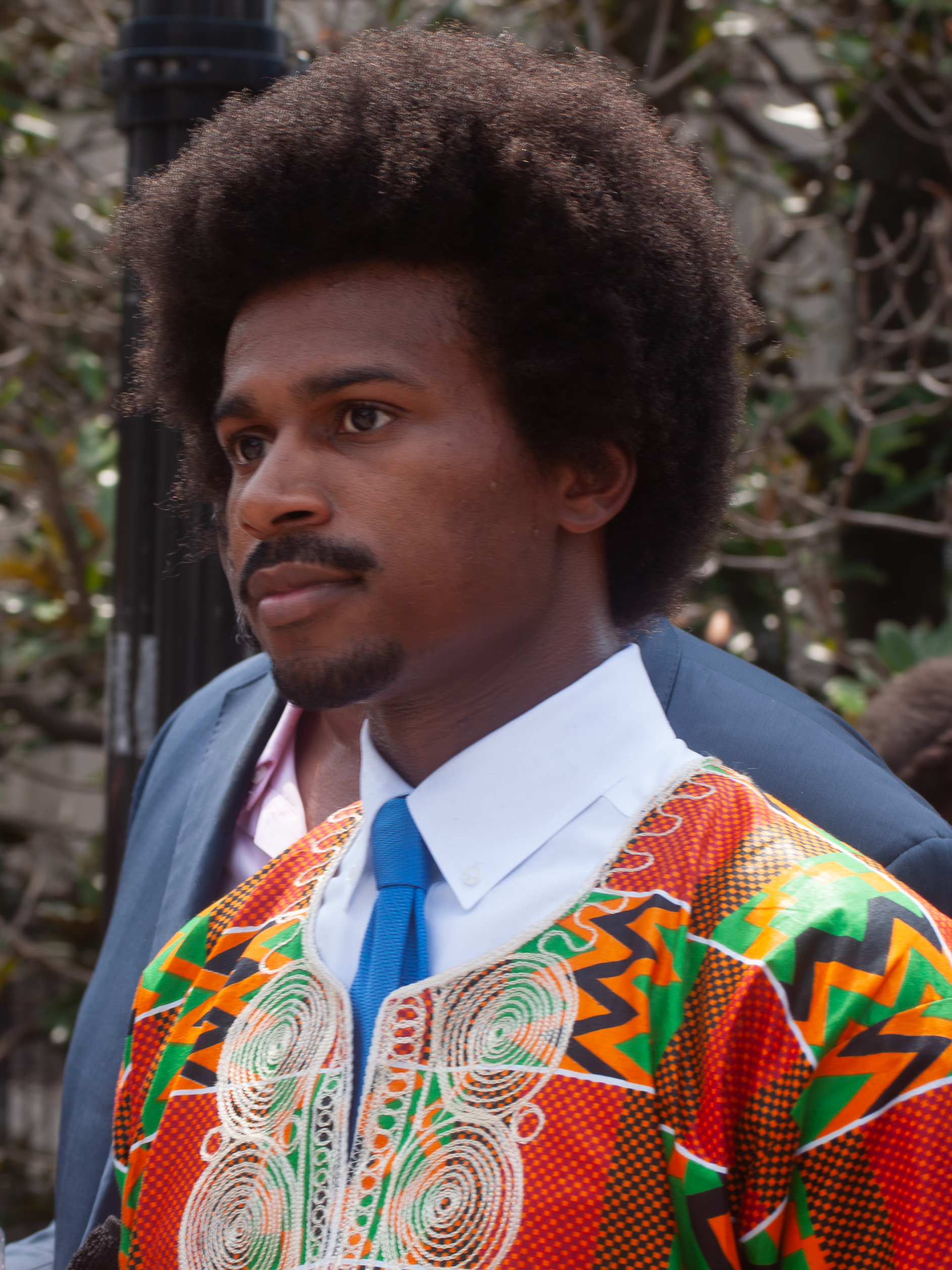
Nominee	Brent Taylor	Justin J. Pearson
Party	Republican	Democratic
Popular vote	111,968	109,429
Percentage	49.63%	48.50%
- Taylor: 50–60% 60–70% 70–80% 80–90% Pearson: 50–60% 80–90%
U.S. Representative before election
Steve Cohen
Democratic
Elected U.S. Representative
Brent Taylor
Republican

Tennessee's 9th congressional district boundary from the 2026 elections Interactive map version

The 9th district includes part of Memphis, extending eastward more than 200 miles across rural portions of West Tennessee and Middle Tennessee. The district encompasses portions of Shelby, Fayette, Maury, Williamson, and Rutherford counties, as well as all of Bedford, Giles, Hardeman, Hardin, Lawrence, Lincoln, Marshall, McNairy, Moore, and Wayne counties.

The district was substantially redrawn in May 2026 during a special legislative session called by Republican Governor Bill Lee, following a U.S. Supreme Court ruling on the Voting Rights Act. The Republican-controlled legislature dismantled Tennessee's only majority-Black congressional district, dividing Memphis among three districts in an effort to flip the state's only Democratic-held congressional seat and secure a Republican sweep of all nine House seats. The changes prompted protests and legal challenges from Democrats and civil rights groups.

The incumbent was Democrat Steve Cohen, who represented the district from 2007 to 2027 and was re-elected with 71.3% of the vote in 2024. Cohen initially sought re-election but withdrew in May 2026 following redistricting. Democrat Justin J. Pearson and Republican Brent Taylor subsequently won their respective primaries to compete for the open seat.

The general election attracted national attention, particularly after Taylor acknowledged sending unsolicited nude photographs to multiple women in 2021, prompting criticism from Pearson during the campaign. Taylor ultimately defeated Pearson in the November 3 general election, receiving 49.6% of the vote to Pearson's 48.5%.

=== Democratic primary ===
==== Nominee ====
- Justin Pearson, state representative from the 86th district (2023, 2023–present)

==== Eliminated in primary ====
- M. LaTroy Alexandria-Williams, community activist
- London Lamar, state senator from the 33rd district (2022–present)
- Jim Torino, healthcare executive

==== Withdrawn ====
- Steve Cohen, incumbent U.S. representative (endorsed Lamar)

==== Endorsements ====
Justin J. Pearson

U.S. Senators

- Ed Markey, Massachusetts (2013–present)
- Bernie Sanders, Vermont (2007–present)

U.S. Representatives

- Maxwell Frost, FL-10 (2023–present)
- Ro Khanna, CA-17 (2017–present)
- Summer Lee, PA-12 (2023–present)
- Alexandria Ocasio-Cortez, NY-14 (2019–present)
- Ilhan Omar, MN-05 (2019–present)
- Ayanna Pressley, MA-07 (2019–present)
- Delia Ramirez, IL-03 (2023–present)
- Rashida Tlaib, MI-12 (2019–present)
- Maxine Waters, CA-43 (1991–present)

State legislators

- Aftyn Behn, state representative from the 51st district (2023–present)
- Shaundelle Brooks, state representative from the 60th district (2025–present)
- Vincent Dixie, state representative from the 24th district (2019–present)
- Bob Freeman, state representative from the 56th district (2019–present)
- Ronnie Glynn, state representative from the 67th district (2023–present)
- Yusuf Hakeem, state representative from the 28th district (2019–present)
- Torrey Harris, state representative from the 91st district (2021–present)
- Gloria Johnson, state representative from the 90th district (2013–present)
- Sam McKenzie, state representative from the 15th district (2021–present)
- Jason Powell, state representative from the 53rd district (2013–present)
- Joe Towns, state representative from the 84th district (1995–present)

Party officials

- David Hogg, former vice chair of the Democratic National Committee (2025)

Individuals

- Ms. Rachel, YouTuber and children's educator

Organizations

- Brady PAC
- The Collective PAC
- Food and Water Action
- Friends of the Earth Action
- Indivisible
- Jane Fonda Climate PAC
- Justice Democrats
- Leaders We Deserve
- MoveOn
- Our Revolution
- PAL PAC
- Progressive Democrats of America
- Sunrise Movement
- Track AIPAC
- Working Families Party

Labor Unions

- Association of Flight Attendants-CWA
- SEIU Local 205
- AFSCME Local 1733
- United Campus Workers of Tennessee - CWA Local 3821
London Lamar

U.S. representatives

- Steve Cohen, TN-09 (2007–present)
- Janelle Bynum, OR-05 (2025–present)
- LaMonica McIver, NJ-10 (2024–present)
- Emilia Sykes, OH-13 (2023–present)
- Harold Ford Sr., TN-09 (1975–1997)
- John Tanner, TN-08 (1989–2011)

State Legislators

- Raumesh Akbari, Tennessee Senator, District 29 (2019–present)
- Brenda Gilmore, Former Tennessee Senator, District 19 (2019–2023)
- Johnny Shaw, Tennessee House District 80 (2001–present)
- Larry Miller, Tennessee House District 88 (1993–present)

Local officials

- Paul Young, mayor of Memphis (2024–present)
- Lee Harris, Mayor of Shelby County (2018–present)
Steve Cohen (withdrawn)

State legislators

- ~~London Lamar, state senator from the 33rd district (2022–present)~~ (entered race in May 2026)

Organizations

- Democratic Majority for Israel
- J Street
- Jewish Democratic Council of America
- Planned Parenthood Action Fund

==== Fundraising ====
Candidates in italics withdrew before the primary election took place.

Campaign finance reports as of July 25, 2026
Candidate	Raised	Spent	Cash on hand
London Lamar (D)	$76,320	$68,714	$7,606
Justin Pearson (D)	$2,344,947	$1,500,214	$844,733
Jim Torino (D)	$119,549	$71,020	$48,529
Source: Federal Election Commission

==== Polling ====
Poll source	Date(s) administered	Sample size	Margin of error	Steve Cohen	Justin Pearson	Undecided
Data for Progress (D) (Note: Poll sponsored by the Justice Democrats, which supports Pearson)	January 30 – February 3, 2026	354 (LV)	5.2%	45%	44%	11%

==== Results ====
Democratic primary results by county: Pearson: 40–50%; 50–60%; 60–70%; 70–80%

Democratic primary results
Party	Candidate	Votes	%
Democratic	Justin Pearson	32,097	65.74%
Democratic	London Lamar	11,876	24.32%
Democratic	M. LaTroy Alexandria-Williams	3,319	6.80%
Democratic	Jim Torino	1,531	3.14%
Total votes		48,823	100.00%

=== Republican primary ===
==== Nominee ====
- Brent Taylor, state senator from the 31st district (2023–present) and candidate for the 7th district in 2002

==== Eliminated in primary ====
- Charlotte Bergmann, former member of the Tennessee Republican Party State Executive Committee and perennial candidate
- Todd Warner, state representative from the 92nd district (2022–present)
- Jeremy Thompson, restaurant owner

==== Endorsements ====
Brent Taylor

Executive branch officials

- Donald Trump, president of the United States (2017–2021, 2025–present)

U.S. senators

- Marsha Blackburn, Tennessee (2019–present)
- Bill Hagerty, Tennessee (2021–present)

U.S. representatives

- Stephen Fincher, former TN-08 (2011–2017)
- Chuck Fleischmann, TN-03 (2011–present)
- Diana Harshbarger, TN-01 (2019–present)
- August Pfluger, TX-11 (2021–present)
- Steve Scalise, House majority leader (2023–present) from LA-01 (2008–present)
- Matt Van Epps, TN-07 (2025–present)

Statewide officials

- Randy McNally, lieutenant governor of Tennessee (2017–present) and state senator from the 5th district (1987–present)

Organizations

- U.S. Chamber of Commerce
Todd Warner

State legislators

- Jody Barrett, state representative from district 69 (2023–present)

==== Fundraising ====
Campaign finance reports as of July 25, 2026
Candidate	Raised	Spent	Cash on hand
Charlotte Bergmann (R)	$63,481	$53,734	$11,747
Brent Taylor (R)	$1,549,482	$1,132,104	$417,377
Jeremy Thompson (R)	$228,564	$186,735	$41,829
Todd Warner (R)	$639,617	$468,526	$171,090
Source: Federal Election Commission

==== Results ====
Republican primary results by county: Taylor: 30–40%; 40–50%; 50–60%; 70–80%; Thompson: 60–70%; Warner: 30–40%

Republican primary results
Party	Candidate	Votes	%
Republican	Brent Taylor	31,057	46.03%
Republican	Todd Warner	17,776	26.35%
Republican	Jeremy Thompson	13,481	19.98%
Republican	Charlotte Bergmann	5,153	7.64%
Total votes		67,467	100.00%

=== Independent candidates ===
==== Declared ====
- Dennis Clark
- Michelle Davis Head

=== General election ===
==== Predictions ====
Source	Ranking	As of
Decision Desk HQ	Likely R (flip)	September 8, 2026
The Cook Political Report	Likely R (flip)	November 2, 2026
Inside Elections	Likely R (flip)	October 29, 2026
Sabato's Crystal Ball	Likely R (flip)	November 2, 2026

==== Post-primary endorsements ====
Justin J. Pearson (D)

Executive branch officials

- Kamala Harris, former vice president of the United States (2021–2025)

U.S. senators

- Chris Murphy, Connecticut (2013–present)

U.S. representatives

- Greg Casar, TX-35 (2023–present) and chair of the Congressional Progressive Caucus
- Suzan DelBene, WA-01 (2012–present)
- Maxwell Frost, FL-10 (2023–present)
- Pramila Jayapal, WA-7 (2017–present)

Labor unions

- American Federation of Government Employees
- National Education Association
- National Nurses United
- Tennessee AFL-CIO
- United Auto Workers

Organizations

- A New Policy PAC
- Congressional Progressive Caucus PAC
- DCCC Red to Blue
- End Citizens United
- Gen-Z for Change
- Progressive Victory
- Third Act Tennessee
- Voters of Tomorrow

==== Fundraising ====
Campaign finance reports as of October 15, 2026
Candidate	Raised	Spent	Cash on hand	Loans
Justin Pearson (D)	$3,642,697	$2,473,452	$1,169,245	$0
Brent Taylor (R)	$2,694,179	$1,872,414	$821,765	$1,542,523
Source: Federal Election Commission

==== Polling ====
Poll source	Date(s) administered	Sample size	Margin of error	Justin Pearson (D)	Brent Taylor (R)	Undecided
Hart Research Associates (D) (Note: Poll sponsored by Tennessee Rise PAC & Three Star PAC)	September 1–3, 2026	400 (LV)	–	44%	48%	8%

== Notes ==
Partisan clients

== See also ==
- Elections in Tennessee
- Political party strength in Tennessee
- Tennessee Democratic Party
- Tennessee Republican Party
- Government of Tennessee
- 2026 United States Senate election in Tennessee
- 2026 Tennessee gubernatorial election
- 2026 Tennessee elections
- 2026 United States elections
