= Charlane Oliver =

American politician (born 1982)

Member of the Tennessee Senate from the 19th district
- Incumbent
- Assumed office January 10, 2023
- Preceded by: Brenda Gilmore

Personal details
- Born: Charlane Relford; October 26, 1982 (age 44)
- Party: Democratic
- Spouse: Leshuan Oliver
- Children: 3
- Education: Vanderbilt University (BS); University of Tennessee (MPA)
- Occupation: Politician; nonprofit executive
- Website: House website

Charlane Oliver (née Relford; born October 26, 1982) is a nonprofit executive and politician from Tennessee. A member of the Democratic Party, she has represented the 19th district in the Tennessee Senate since 2023.

== Early life and career ==
Charlane Oliver was born on October 26, 1982, to parents Monroe and Melvia Relford. Her father was a veteran of the United States Air Force, and her mother was a public school teacher. Oliver grew up in Little Rock, Arkansas. In 2005, she graduated from Vanderbilt University with a BS in human and organizational development and a minor in corporate strategy; three years later, she graduated from the University of Tennessee with an MPA. After graduation, Oliver worked for the state of Tennessee, Meharry Medical Center in Nashville, the Knoxville Urban League, the Williamson County Chamber of Commerce, and U.S. Representative Jim Cooper.

In 2016, Oliver co-founded the Equity Alliance, an organization dedicated to educating Black voters.

In 2020, Oliver joined an advisory group assembled by Nashville Mayor John Cooper on Nashville's use of CARES Act funds. Oliver delivered the group's recommendations, which included providing grants to childcare programs to help working parents, opening voting locations in underserved communities, and funding local businesses denied SBA loans during the pandemic.

== Tennessee Senate (2023–present) ==
=== Election ===
In April 2022, Senator Brenda Gilmore of the 19th district announced her retirement. Oliver entered the race for the Democratic nomination to the seat and defeated four other candidates in the primary. She later won the general election against Republican Pime Hernandez.

=== Tenure ===
On March 13, 2026, Oliver co-sponsored legislation to restrict businesses and investors purchasing high numbers of single-family homes. She garnered bipartisan support for the bill on the House floor, but the legislation died in committee when fellow Democrat Bo Mitchell refused to second a motion for its consideration. In response, Oliver posted on social media, claiming that Mitchell refused to support the bill due to pettiness over Oliver's special election endorsement for Aftyn Behn and his "grudge" over having lost the primary to a woman. Oliver and Mitchell had previously clashed over housing policy.

On April 29, 2026, the Supreme Court ruled in Louisiana v. Callais, making it more difficult for claims of vote dilution through gerrymandering to succeed in court. In response, the Tennessee General Assembly entered an extraordinary session to redraw the state's congressional map, eliminating the state's only majority minority congressional district. As lawmakers gathered to vote on the proposed map, Oliver unfurled a banner with the text "Jim Crow 2.0" and "Stop the TN Steal", while singing the hymn "Lift Every Voice and Sing". Lieutenant Governor and Speaker of the Tennessee Senate Randy McNally blocked Oliver from voting on the map, later issuing a statement calling her conduct "disgraceful".

==== Committee assignments ====
Oliver serves on the following committees in the Tennessee Senate:

- Energy, Agriculture and Natural Resources Committee
- Government Operations Committee
- Joint Education, Health and General Welfare Committee
- Joint Commerce, Labor, Transportation and Agriculture

== Personal life ==
Oliver is married to Leshuan Oliver, a law enforcement agent. They have a daughter and two sons. Oliver has cited the shooting of Trayvon Martin, which occurred two days after the birth of her older son, as an inspiration for entering advocacy. She has publicly described herself as a sexual assault survivor. She is Christian.

== Electoral history ==
2022 Tennessee Senate, 19th district, Democratic Party primary election
Party	Candidate	Votes	%
Democratic	Charlane Oliver	5,801	33.4
Democratic	Jerry Maynard	5,152	29.7
Democratic	Barry Barlow	4,554	26.2
Democratic	Ludye Wallace	1,521	8.8
Democratic	Rossi Turner	336	1.9
Total votes		17,364	100.00

2022 Tennessee Senate, 19th district, general election
Party	Candidate	Votes	%
Democratic	Charlane Oliver	30,472	83.2
Republican	Pime Hernandez	6,150	16.8
Total votes		36,662	100.00
Democratic hold			
