= 2025 Tennessee's 7th congressional district special election =

- December 2, 2025

Tennessee's 7th congressional district
- Turnout: ~38% ▼ (Note: The Tennessee Secretary of State has not released an official districtwide turnout report. Turnout is calculated by dividing the total number of votes cast by the number of registered voters. Using 180,012 votes cast and approximately 469,000 registered voters, the result comes to about 0.38.)
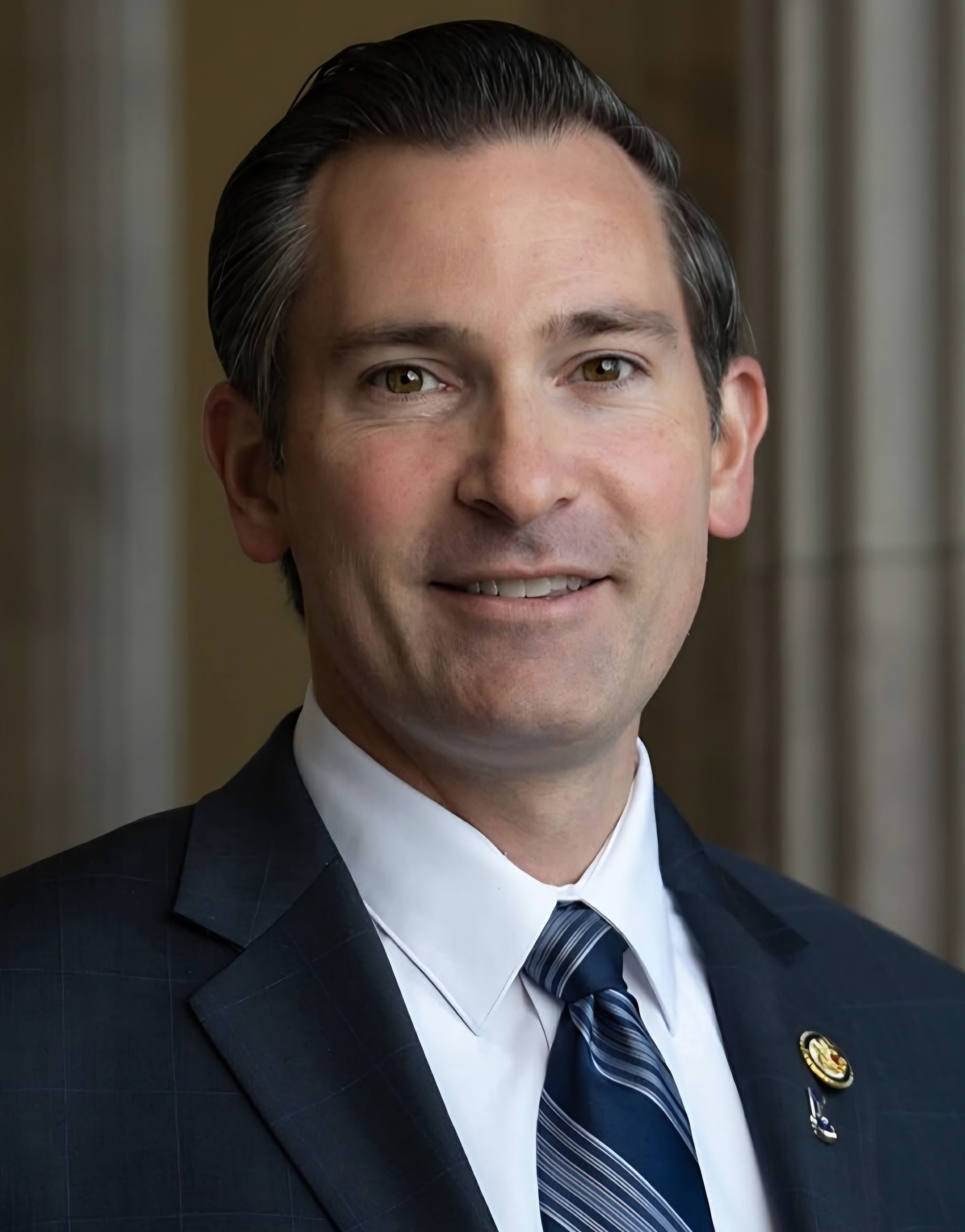

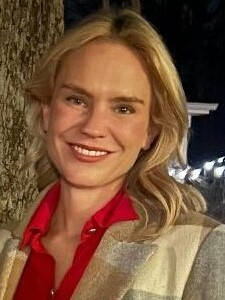
Nominee	Matt Van Epps	Aftyn Behn
Party	Republican	Democratic
Popular vote	97,034	81,109
Percentage	53.90%	45.06%
- Van Epps: 40–50% 50–60% 60–70% 70–80% 80–90% >90% Behn: 40–50% 50–60% 60–70% 70–80% 80–90% >90% No data
U.S. Representative before election
Mark Green
Republican
Elected U.S. Representative
Matt Van Epps
Republican

The 2025 Tennessee's 7th congressional district special election was held on December 2, 2025, to fill the vacant seat in Tennessee's 7th congressional district. The deadline for entering the special election was on October 7, 2025. Republican Matt Van Epps defeated Democratic nominee Aftyn Behn in the general election, and will serve in the United States House of Representatives for the remainder of the 119th United States Congress, which will end on January 3, 2027. The seat became vacant on July 20, 2025, following the resignation of Republican Mark Green, who took a private sector job. Green resigned after voting to help pass the One Big Beautiful Bill Act.

Primary elections took place on October 7, where Republican Matt Van Epps and Democrat Aftyn Behn won their respective primaries. The in-person early voting period ran from November 12 to 26.

In the December 2 general election, Van Epps defeated Behn by 8.8%. Democrats significantly improved their margins in the special election, overperforming their 2024 result by 12.6%. Although voter turnout was lower, as is common in special elections, it reached a level similar to what the district recorded during the 2022 midterms. This marked the strongest Democratic performance in the district since 1982.

Van Epps was sworn in to Congress on December 4, 2025.

== Partisan background ==
The 7th congressional district is a mixed urban-rural district includes parts of Nashville that are heavily Democratic, such as downtown, two universities, Belmont and Vanderbilt, and most of the city's majority-black precincts. Surrounding counties, including Cheatham, Dickson, Robertson, and Williamson, are generally affluent and include mainly majority-white exurbs and suburbs. Franklin, in particular, is a wealthy Republican suburban stronghold. Montgomery County, anchored by Clarksville, Tennessee's fifth-largest city, is politically mixed and slightly more competitive than the district overall. Clarksville is diverse, with White, Black, and Hispanic populations spread throughout the city, and the county often serves as a bellwether for the district. The district's rural areas are overwhelmingly Republican, consisting of eight counties that are predominantly White, and this portion helps maintain the district's strongly red character.

In the 2024 presidential election, the district voted for Donald Trump by more than 22%. It also supported Mark Green in 2024 by over 21%. The district's 2025 Cook PVI was R+10.

== Campaign ==
=== Republican primary ===
The Republican primary was held on October 7, 2025, to fill the vacancy created by the resignation of Mark Green. The contest featured 11 candidates, including state representatives Jody Barrett, Gino Bulso, Lee Reeves and businessman Stuart Cooper. Matt Van Epps, an Army veteran and former commissioner of the Tennessee Department of General Services, ran on a platform of border security and the "America First" agenda.

On October 3, 2025, Donald Trump endorsed Van Epps, leading fellow candidates Lee Reeves and Stuart Cooper to withdraw and endorse him, though Reeves' and Cooper's name remained on the ballot. The endorsement triggered a broader consolidation of party support behind Van Epps, who won the primary with 51.6% of the vote. He carried 12 of the district's 14 counties, while Barrett won his home counties of Dickson and Hickman.

=== Democratic primary ===
Four candidates contested the Democratic primary: state representatives Aftyn Behn, Vincent Dixie, and Bo Mitchell, and consultant Darden Copeland. Behn, a community organizer and social worker, won the nomination with a plurality of 27.9% of the vote, defeating Copeland by 933 votes. Her campaign focused on universal healthcare, rural hospital funding, and the rising cost of living. National Democratic groups monitored the race as a test of progressive messaging in a district redrawn in 2022 to include Democratic strongholds in Nashville.

=== General election ===
The general election campaign was characterized by significant national investment. Speaker of the House Mike Johnson campaigned with Van Epps, and President Trump participated in "tele-rallies" to boost turnout. Conservative super PACs, including MAGA Inc., spent over $1.7 million on advertising targeting Behn. Behn received high-profile support from former vice president Al Gore, U.S. representative Alexandria Ocasio-Cortez, and former vice president Kamala Harris. In November, Harris visited Nashville to headline a canvassing kickoff for the Tennessee Democratic Party. While Harris did not mention Behn by name during her remarks, she urged voters to recognize the "power in the South" and emphasized the national significance of the special election.

The campaign featured aggressive attack advertisements from both sides. Republican groups ran ads highlighting Behn's past comments where she described herself as a "radical" and claimed to have "bullied" state police during protests; ads also resurfaced an old social media post where she stated she "hated" the city of Nashville and country music. Behn dismissed these as distractions from her focus on healthcare affordability. Conversely, Democratic ads criticized Van Epps for his ties to national Republican leadership and his support for the One Big Beautiful Bill Act, which Behn characterized as a "transfer of wealth to the rich".

== Republican primary ==
=== Candidates ===
==== Nominee ====
- Matt Van Epps, former commissioner of the Tennessee Department of General Services (2024–2025)

==== Eliminated in primary ====
- Jody Barrett, state representative from the 69th district (2023–present)
- Gino Bulso, state representative from the 61st district (2023–present)
- Adolph Dagan, teacher
- Mason Foley, former legislative correspondent for U.S. Senator Mitch McConnell
- Jason Knight, Montgomery County commissioner and candidate for Tennessee's 22nd Senate district in 2019
- Joe Leurs, retired police officer
- Stewart Parks, realtor, participant in the January 6 Capitol attack, and candidate for the 5th district in 2022
- Tres Wittum, legislative policy analyst, candidate for Tennessee's 5th congressional district in 2022 and candidate for U.S. Senate in 2024

==== Withdrawn ====
- Stuart Cooper, businessman (endorsed Van Epps; remained on ballot)
- Jay Reedy, state representative from the 74th district (2015–present) (endorsed Bulso)
- Jon Thorp, commercial helicopter pilot (ran as an independent)
- Lee Reeves, state representative from the 65th district (2025–present) (endorsed Van Epps; remained on ballot)

==== Declined ====
- Aron Maberry, state representative from the 68th district (2025–present) (endorsed Reeves)
- Brandon Ogles, former state representative from the 61st district (2019–2023), candidate for this district in 2024, and cousin of U.S. representative Andy Ogles
- Bill Powers, state senator from the 22nd district (2019–present)

=== Endorsements ===
Jody Barrett

Executive branch officials

- Michael Flynn, former U.S. National Security Advisor (2017)

Local officials

- Tim Eads, Dickson County sheriff
- Tito Ortiz, former Huntington Beach, California city councilmember (2020–2021)

Individuals

- Camie Guenther-Green, ex-wife of former U.S. representative Mark Green
- John Rich, musician

Organizations

- House Freedom Fund
Gino Bulso

State legislators

- Jay Reedy, state representative from the 74th district (2015–present)

Individuals

- Darrell Waltrip, former NASCAR driver
Matt Van Epps

Executive branch officials

- Donald Trump, 45th and 47th president of the United States (2017–2021, 2025–present)

U.S. representative

- Mark Green, former U.S. representative from Tennessee's 7th congressional district (2019–2025)
- Mike Haridopolos, U.S. representative from Florida's 8th congressional district (2025–present)
- Jim Jordan, U.S. representative from Ohio's 4th congressional district (2007–present)
- David McIntosh, former U.S. representative from Indiana's 2nd congressional district (1995–2001)

Statewide officials

- Bill Haslam, former Governor of Tennessee (2011–2019)
- Bill Lee, Governor of Tennessee (2019–present)

State legislators

- Lee Reeves, state representative from the 65th district (2025–present)

Local officials

- Glenn Jacobs, Knox County mayor (2018–2026) (Note: Glenn Jacobs endorsed Matt Van Epps after Lee Reeves, whom he had originally endorsed, dropped out.)
- Michael Lankford, Montgomery County commissioner

Organizations

- Club for Growth
- With Honor Fund
Lee Reeves (withdrawn)

State legislators

- Jeremy Faison, state representative from the 11th district (2011–present)
- Jack Johnson, majority leader of the Tennessee Senate (2019–present) from the 27th district (2007–present)
- Aron Maberry, state representative from the 68th district (2025–present)
- Jake McCalmon, state representative from the 63th district (2023–present)

Local officials

- Glenn Jacobs, Knox County mayor (2018–2026)
- 7 other mayors

Party officials

- Lonnie Spivak, former chair of the Nashville Republican Party

Organizations

- GOPAC

=== Fundraising ===
Italics indicate a withdrawn candidate.

Campaign finance reports as of November 11, 2025
Candidate	Raised	Spent	Cash on hand
Gino Bulso (R)	$757,062 (Note: $693,973 of this total was self-funded by Bulso)	$701,501	$55,561
Jody Barrett (R)	$316,907	$255,345	$61,562
Stuart Cooper (R)	$34,653 (Note: $1,995 of this total was self-funded by Cooper)	$28,793	$5,859
Mason Foley (R)	$405,548 (Note: $325,000 of this total was self-funded by Foley)	$391,822	$13,726
Jason Knight (R)	$41,865 (Note: $20,000 of this total was self-funded by Knight)	$36,093	$5,772
Joe Leurs (R)	$6,604	$17,747	$0
Stewart Parks (R)	$362,210 (Note: $67,167 of this total was self-funded by Parks)	$358,595	$3,615
Matthew Van Epps (R)	$992,716	$761,549	$231,167
Lee Reeves (R)	$578,854 (Note: $300,000 of this total was self-funded by Reeves)	$550,388	$28,466
Source: Federal Election Commission

=== Polling ===
Poll source	Date(s) administered	Sample size (Note: Key: A – all adults RV – registered voters LV – likely voters V – unclear)	Margin of error	Jody Barrett	Gino Bulso	Lee Reeves	Matt Van Epps	Other	Undecided
Spry Strategies (Note: This poll was sponsored by Americans for Prosperity Tennessee)	August 19–23, 2025	500 (LV)	± 4.4%	10%	9%	8%	7%	8% (Note: Knight with 3%; Wittum with 2%; Cooper, Dagan, and Parks with 1%; Foley and Leurs with 0%)	58%

=== Results ===
Results by county: Van Epps: 30–40%; 40–50%; 50–60%; 60–70%; Barrett: 50–60%

Results by precinct: Van Epps: 30–40%; 40–50%; 50–60%; 60–70%; 70–80%; >90%; Barrett: 20–30%; 30–40%; 40–50%; 50–60%; 60–70%; 70–80%; Bulso: 30–40%; 40–50%; Parks: >90%; Tie: 20–30% 30–40%; 40–50%; 50%; No data/No votes

Matt Van Epps won twelve of the fourteen counties, while Jody Barrett won the two counties he represents in the Tennessee State House, Dickson and Hickman.

Republican primary results
Party	Candidate	Votes	%
Republican	Matt Van Epps	19,006	51.56%
Republican	Jody Barrett	9,337	25.33%
Republican	Gino Bulso	4,005	10.86%
Republican	Lee Reeves (withdrawn)	1,929	5.23%
Republican	Mason Foley	1,022	2.77%
Republican	Stewart Parks	595	1.61%
Republican	Jason Knight	381	1.03%
Republican	Stuart Cooper (withdrawn)	239	0.65%
Republican	Tres Wittum	133	0.36%
Republican	Joe Leurs	122	0.33%
Republican	Adolph Dagan	93	0.25%
Total votes		36,862	100.00%

==== By county ====
Results by county
County	Van Epps		Barrett		Bulso		Reeves		Parks		Others		Total
Benton (part)	336	51.53%	132	20.25%	123	18.87%	17	2.61%	25	3.83%	19	2.91%	652
Cheatham	1,695	57.75%	681	23.20%	234	7.97%	116	3.95%	42	1.43%	167	5.69%	2,935
Davidson (part)	1,359	52.11%	474	18.17%	318	12.19%	158	6.06%	52	1.99%	247	9.47%	2,608
Decatur	427	58.25%	120	16.37%	72	9.82%	27	3.68%	58	7.91%	29	3.96%	733
Dickson	1,504	36.00%	2,201	52.68%	256	6.13%	124	2.97%	29	0.69%	64	1.53%	4,178
Hickman	567	28.72%	1,041	52.74%	199	10.08%	59	2.99%	54	2.74%	54	2.74%	1,974
Houston	232	34.63%	165	24.63%	214	31.94%	15	2.24%	23	3.43%	21	3.13%	670
Humphreys	568	47.61%	368	30.85%	146	12.24%	48	4.02%	12	1.01%	51	4.27%	1,193
Montgomery	5,837	66.87%	1148	13.15%	915	10.48%	307	3.52%	51	0.58%	471	5.40%	8,729
Perry	230	46.00%	167	33.40%	61	12.20%	13	2.60%	18	3.60%	11	2.20%	500
Robertson	2,810	64.18%	628	14.34%	503	11.49%	153	3.49%	69	1.58%	215	4.91%	4,378
Stewart	590	58.65%	147	14.61%	164	16.30%	34	3.38%	40	3.98%	31	3.08%	1,006
Wayne	457	50.89%	268	29.84%	69	7.68%	30	3.34%	40	4.45%	34	3.79%	898
Williamson (part)	2,394	37.36%	1,797	28.04%	731	11.41%	828	12.92%	82	1.28%	576	8.99%	6,408
Totals	19,006	51.56%	9,337	25.33%	4,005	10.86%	1,929	5.23%	595	1.61%	1,990	5.39%	36,862

== Democratic primary ==
=== Candidates ===
==== Nominee ====
- Aftyn Behn, state representative from the 51st district (2023–present)

==== Eliminated in primary ====
- Darden Copeland, consultant
- Vincent Dixie, state representative from the 54th district (2019–present)
- Bo Mitchell, state representative from the 50th district (2013–present)

==== Declined ====
- Charlane Oliver, state senator from the 19th district (2023–present)
- Megan Barry, former mayor of Nashville (2015–2018) and nominee for this district in 2024

=== Endorsements ===
Aftyn Behn

Organizations

- Indivisible Tennessee
- Knoxville Democratic Socialists of America
- Moms Demand Action
- Progressive Democrats of America
- Tennessee College Democrats
Vincent Dixie

State legislators

- Gloria Johnson, state representative from the 90th district (2013–2015, 2019–present)

Organizations

- The Collective PAC
Bo Mitchell

U.S. representatives

- Bob Clement, U.S. representative from Tennessee's 5th congressional district (1988–2003)
- John Tanner, U.S. representative from Tennessee's 8th congressional district (1989–2011)

State legislators

- Heidi Campbell, state senator from the 20th district (2021–present)

Local officials

- Jason Spain, Nashville metro councilmember from the 30th district
- Sheri Weiner, Nashville metro councilmember from the 22nd district

Labor unions

- International Association of Fire Fighters Local 140

=== Fundraising ===
Campaign finance reports as of November 12, 2025
Candidate	Raised	Spent	Cash on hand
Aftyn Behn (D)	$1,230,629	$708,892	$521,737
Darden Copeland (D)	$591,675 (Note: $100,000 of this total was self-funded by Copeland)	$483,889	$107,786
Vincent Dixie (D)	$161,609	$145,924	$15,685
Bo Mitchell (D)	$228,777	$198,633	$30,144
Source: Federal Election Commission

=== Results ===
Results by county: Behn: 30–40%; Copeland: 30–40%; 40–50%; 50–60%; Mitchell: 30–40%; 40–50%; 50–60%; 60–70%; Dixie: 30–40%

Results by precinct: Behn: 30–40%; 40–50%; 50–60%; 60–70%; 70–80%; >90%; Copeland: 20–30%; 30–40%; 40–50%; 50–60%; 60–70%; 70–80%; 80–90%; Mitchell: 20–30%; 30–40%; 40–50%; 50–60%; 60–70%; 70–80%; 80–90%; >90%; Dixie: 20–30%; 30–40%; 40–50%; 50–60%; 60–70% 70–80%; Tie: 20–30% 30–40%; 50%; No data/No votes

Aftyn Behn narrowly won, carrying one county, Williamson County, by a slim margin. She performed well in the more populous Montgomery and Davidson counties, which helped secure her victory. Darden Copeland and Bo Mitchell each carried six counties, while Vincent Dixie won Davidson.

Democratic primary results
Party	Candidate	Votes	%
Democratic	Aftyn Behn	8,653	27.89%
Democratic	Darden Copeland	7,720	24.88%
Democratic	Bo Mitchell	7,498	24.17%
Democratic	Vincent Dixie	7,153	23.06%
Total votes		31,024	100.00%

==== By county ====
Results by county
County	Behn		Copeland		Mitchell		Dixie		Total
Benton (part)	36	21.05%	68	39.77%	65	38.01%	2	1.17%	171
Cheatham	397	24.69%	512	31.84%	601	37.38%	98	6.09%	1,608
Davidson (part)	3,919	28.39%	1,856	13.44%	2,920	21.15%	5,110	37.02%	13,805
Decatur	19	8.84%	75	34.88%	118	54.88%	3	1.40%	215
Dickson	376	24.85%	400	26.44%	684	45.21%	53	3.50%	1,513
Hickman	57	13.35%	164	38.41%	190	44.50%	16	3.75%	427
Houston	56	27.72%	81	40.10%	59	29.21%	6	2.97%	202
Humphreys	81	15.14%	189	35.33%	247	46.17%	18	3.36%	535
Montgomery	1,931	28.77%	2,146	31.97%	1,216	18.12%	1,419	21.14%	6,712
Perry	15	9.38%	37	23.13%	106	66.25%	2	1.25%	160
Robertson	372	23.15%	678	42.19%	417	25.95%	140	8.71%	1,607
Stewart	56	17.28%	174	53.70%	80	24.69%	14	4.32%	324
Wayne	15	9.74%	76	49.35%	56	36.36%	7	4.55%	154
Williamson (part)	1,323	36.84%	1,264	35.20%	739	20.58%	265	7.38%	3,591
Totals	8,653	27.89%	7,720	24.88%	7,498	24.17%	7,153	23.06%	31,024

== Independents ==
=== Candidates ===
==== Declared ====
- Terri Christie, boat captain
- Bobby Dodge
- Robert James Sutherby
- Jon Thorp, commercial helicopter pilot (previously ran as a Republican)

=== Fundraising ===
Campaign finance reports as of September 30, 2025
Candidate	Raised	Spent	Cash on hand
Jon Thorp (I)	$7,392	$7,332	$60
Source: Federal Election Commission

== General election ==
=== Predictions ===
Source	Ranking	As of
Inside Elections	Lean R	November 20, 2025
The Cook Political Report	Likely R	November 13, 2025
Sabato's Crystal Ball	Likely R	July 10, 2025

=== Post-primary endorsements ===
Matt Van Epps (R)

U.S. representatives

- Tim Burchett, U.S. representative from Tennessee's 2nd congressional district (2019–present)
- Mike Johnson, speaker of the United States House of Representatives (2023–present) from Louisiana's 4th congressional district (2017–present)
- Andy Ogles, U.S. representative from Tennessee's 5th congressional district (2023–present)

State legislators

- Jack Johnson, majority leader of the Tennessee Senate (2019–present) from the 27th district (2007–present)
- Joe Gruters, state senator from Florida's 22nd district (2018–present) and chair of the Republican National Committee (2025–present)

Individuals

- Kid Rock, musician

Organizations

- National Federation of Independent Business FedPAC
Aftyn Behn (D)

Executive branch officials

- Al Gore, 45th vice president of the United States (1993–2001) and former U.S. senator from Tennessee (1985–1993)

U.S. representatives

- Jasmine Crockett, U.S. representative from Texas's 30th congressional district (2023–2027)
- Alexandria Ocasio-Cortez, U.S. representative from New York's 14th congressional district (2019–present)
- Maxwell Frost, U.S. representative from Florida's 10th congressional district (2023–present)
- Pramila Jayapal, U.S. representative from Washington's 7th congressional district (2017–present)

State legislators

- Charlane Oliver, state senator from the 19th district (2023–present)

Party officials

- David Hogg, former vice chair of the Democratic National Committee (2025)
- Ken Martin, chair of the Democratic National Committee (2025–present)

Labor unions

- Tennessee AFL-CIO

Organizations

- Congressional Progressive Caucus PAC
- Elect Democratic Women
- End Citizens United
- Jane Fonda Climate PAC
- National Women's Political Caucus
- Stand Up for Science
- People for the American Way

Political parties

- Working Families Party

=== Polling ===
Poll source	Date(s) administered	Sample size	Margin of error	Matt Van Epps (R)	Aftyn Behn (D)	Other	Undecided
Emerson College (Note: Poll sponsored by Nexstar Media Group)	November 22–24, 2025	600 (LV)	± 3.9%	48%	46%	2% (Note: Thorp with 1%, Christie with 1%, Dodge and Sutherby with <1%)	5%
Emerson College	November 22–24, 2025	600 (LV)	± 3.9%	49% (Note: With voters who lean towards a given candidate)	47%	4% (Note: Thorp with 2%, Christie with 1%, Dodge with 1%, Sutherby with <1%)	–
Impact Research (D) (Note: This poll was sponsored by Your Community PAC)	October 16–19, 2025	700 (LV)	± 3.7%	52%	44%	1% (Note: Thorp (I) with 1%)	3%
Workbench Strategy (D) (Note: This poll was sponsored by Behn's campaign)	October 15–19, 2025	400 (LV)	± 5.7%	51%	41%	7% (Note: "Independent candidates" with 7%)	1%
Workbench Strategy (D)	October 15–19, 2025	400 (LV)	± 5.7%	52% (Note: With voters who lean towards a given candidate)	44%	4% (Note: "Would Not Vote/Undecided/Don't Know" with 4%)	

=== Results ===
2025 Tennessee's 7th congressional district special election
Party	Candidate	Votes	%	±%
Republican	Matt Van Epps	97,034	53.90%	−5.60
Democratic	Aftyn Behn	81,109	45.06%	+7.01
Independent	Jon Thorp	932	0.52%	N/A
Independent	Terri Christie	610	0.34%	N/A
Independent	Bobby Dodge	198	0.11%	N/A
Independent	Robert Sutherby	129	0.07%	N/A
Total votes		180,012	100.00%	
Republican hold				

==== By county ====
County	Matt Van Epps Republican		Aftyn Behn Democratic		Various candidates Independent		Margin			Total votes cast
County	#	%	#	%	#	%	#	%	Swing	Total votes cast
Benton (part)	1,724	77.24%	470	21.06%	38	1.70%	1,254	56.18%	−5.16%	2,232
Cheatham	7,917	66.27%	3,910	32.73%	120	1.00%	4,007	33.54%	−8.94%	11,947
Davidson (part)	9,163	21.57%	32,990	77.65%	330	0.78%	−23,827	−56.08%	−19.36%	42,483
Decatur	1,970	79.34%	486	19.57%	27	1.09%	1,484	59.77%	−5.78%	2,483
Dickson	9,169	69.93%	3,812	29.07%	130	0.99%	5,357	40.86%	−7.28%	13,111
Hickman	3,883	75.90%	1,157	22.62%	76	1.49%	2,726	53.28%	−4.27%	5,116
Houston	1,408	72.76%	506	26.15%	21	1.09%	902	46.61%	−7.53%	1,935
Humphreys	3,035	71.41%	1,159	27.27%	56	1.32%	1,876	44.14%	−7.28%	4,250
Montgomery	22,997	53.34%	19,552	45.35%	569	1.32%	3,445	7.99%	−11.72%	43,118
Perry	1,274	76.75%	364	21.93%	22	1.33%	910	54.82%	−8.63%	1,660
Robertson	12,608	71.07%	4,911	27.68%	221	1.25%	7,697	43.39%	−4.00%	17,740
Stewart	2,588	76.25%	767	22.60%	39	1.15%	1,821	53.65%	−7.88%	3,394
Wayne	2,412	84.63%	417	14.63%	21	0.74%	1,995	70.00%	−4.25%	2,850
Williamson (part)	16,886	60.98%	10,608	38.31%	199	0.72%	6,278	22.67%	−9.52%	27,693
Totals	97,034	53.90%	81,109	45.06%	1,869	1.04%	15,925	8.84%	−12.61%	180,012

Swing by county: Democratic — +2.5–5%; Democratic — +5–7.5%; Democratic — +7.5–10%; Democratic — +10–12.5%; Democratic — +>15%

== Analysis ==
Despite Matt Van Epps winning the seat, political analysts and local media noted that Aftyn Behn significantly narrowed the margin in a district that Donald Trump carried by more than 22 percent and that Mark Green carried by more than 21 percent in 2024. Behn improved upon prior Democratic performances in every county within the district and recorded gains in urban, suburban, exurban, and rural areas.

Precinct flips from 2024: Democratic Hold Gain from Republican / Republican Hold

Aftyn Behn's strongest gains were concentrated in the Davidson County portion of the district, anchored by Nashville, where Democratic margins shifted nearly 20 percent compared to former Nashville mayor Megan Barry's 2024 performance. She carried most urban Nashville precincts by large margins.

In Montgomery County, Behn performed the best in Clarksville, where she flipped several precincts mainly in the northeastern part of the city and performed well in downtown and other traditionally Democratic parts of the city. This was her only other county besides Davidson in which she gained more than double digits and marked her second-best performance in the district. While Behn did well in Clarksville, she lost Montgomery County by 8 percent, as Van Epps held enough ground in the southern and eastern parts of the county to win it.

In Williamson County, Behn made notable gains in portions of Franklin, flipping some precincts in the city. While she was unable to reduce the Republican margin in the county to below 60 percent, she still gained ground by shifting the county nearly 10 percent. Despite this shift, analysts at Sabato's Crystal Ball noted that her performance in this populous subsection of the district was relatively "stagnant" compared to the larger swings seen elsewhere. Her margin in the county was similar to the results recorded during the 2020 election. However, she trailed the 2018 performance of Phil Bredesen, who narrowly lost the 7th District under these lines during his senate campaign.

Republican advantages in mainly suburban, exurban, and rural areas across the district ultimately secured the victory for Van Epps.

In 2026, Van Epps won by an even narrower margin of just 2.2%. This was partially attributed to the 2026 Tennessee redistricting making the district more competitive, and partially due to another strong blue environment.

== See also ==
- 2025 United States elections
- List of special elections to the United States House of Representatives
- List of United States representatives from Tennessee
- Political party strength in Tennessee
- 119th United States Congress

== Notes ==
Partisan clients
