= Matt Van Epps =

American politician (born 1983)

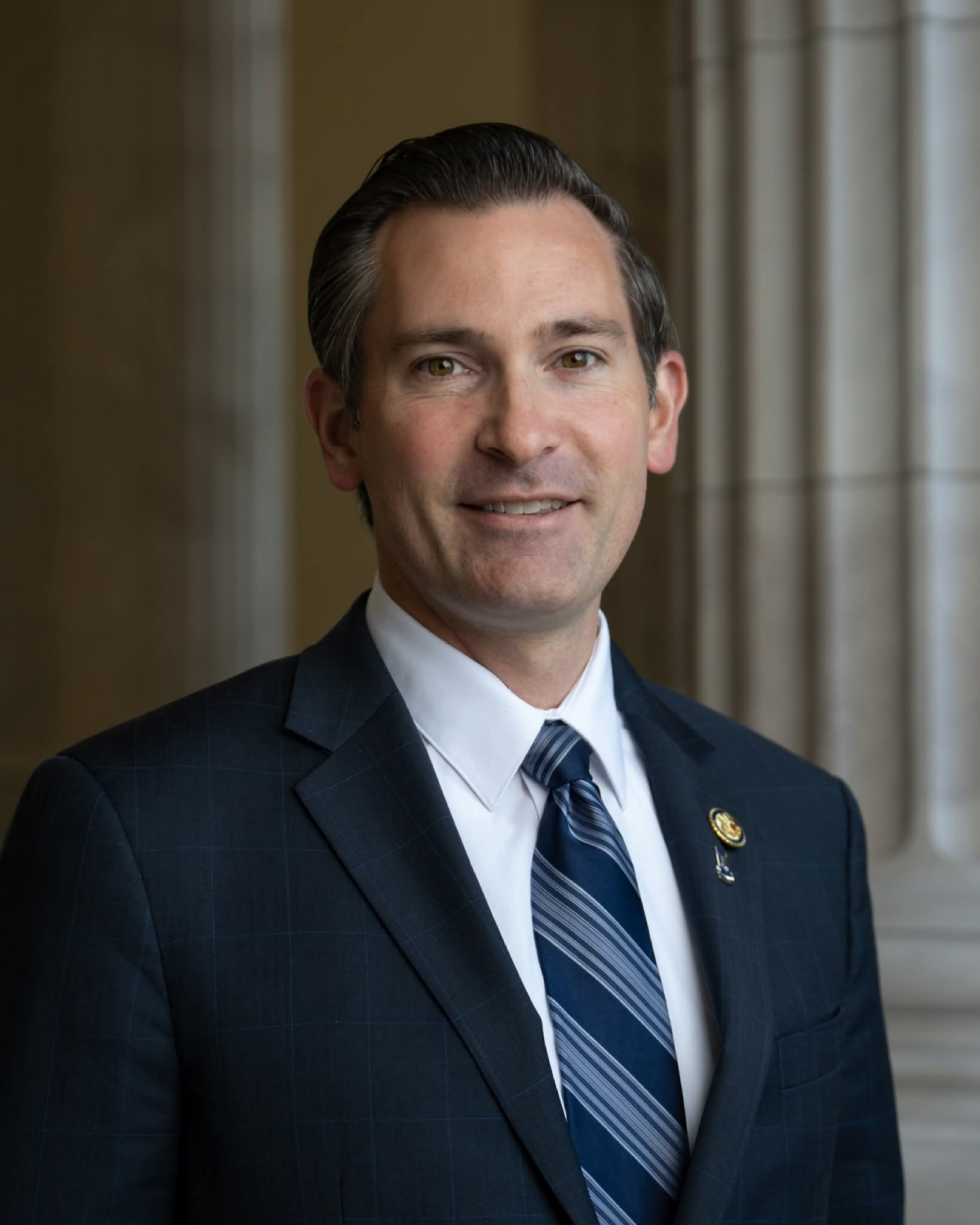
- Official portrait, 2026

Member of the U.S. House of Representatives from Tennessee's 7th district
- Incumbent
- Assumed office December 4, 2025
- Preceded by: Mark Green

Tennessee Commissioner of General Services
- In office September 17, 2024 – June 10, 2025
- Governor: Bill Lee
- Preceded by: Christi Branscom
- Succeeded by: Jeff Holmes

Personal details
- Born: Matthew Robert Van Epps; March 29, 1983 (age 43) Ohio, U.S.
- Party: Republican
- Spouse: Meg Wrather (m. 2023)
- Children: 1
- Education: United States Military Academy (BS); University of North Carolina, Chapel Hill (MPA)
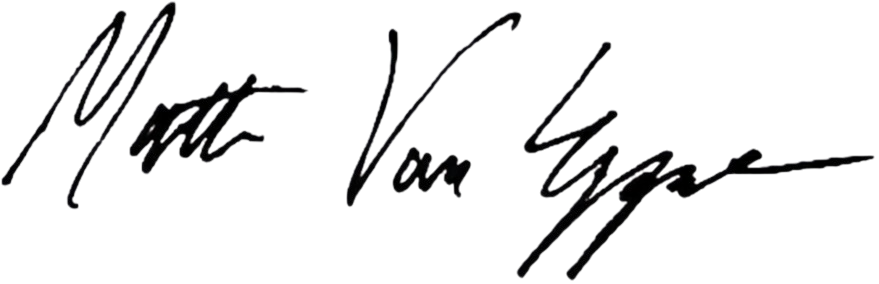
- Signature
- Website: House website Campaign website

Military service
- Branch/service: United States Army; Tennessee Army National Guard
- Years of service: 2005–2015; 2015–present (guard)
- Rank: Lieutenant Colonel
- Unit: 160th Special Operations Aviation Regiment (Airborne)
- Battles/wars: Iraq War; Operation Iraqi Freedom; War in Afghanistan
- Awards: Air Medal
- Van Epps's voice Van Epps after being sworn in. Recorded December 4, 2025

Matthew Robert Van Epps (born March 29, 1983) is an American politician and former Army officer serving as the U.S representative for Tennessee's 7th congressional district since December 2025. A member of the Republican Party, he was elected in the 2025 special election. He previously served as the commissioner of the Tennessee Department of General Services from 2024 to 2025. He was sworn in on December 4, 2025.

== Early life and education ==
Matthew Robert Van Epps was born on March 29, 1983. He graduated from Mentor High School in Mentor, Ohio, where he played baseball, football, and was a member of the National Honor Society. After leaving the Army, Van Epps obtained a master's degree in public administration from the University of North Carolina at Chapel Hill.

== Military service ==
Van Epps graduated from the United States Military Academy at West Point in 2005 and commissioned into the Army as an aviation officer, serving on active duty for ten years. He currently serves as a lieutenant colonel in the Tennessee Army National Guard. During his military career, he was awarded the Air Medal with "V" device, the Bronze Star, and the Meritorious Service Medal.

== Political career ==
Van Epps was appointed commissioner of the Tennessee Department of General Services by Governor Bill Lee, serving from 2024 to 2025. On June 10, 2025, he resigned from his post to run in the 2025 special election for Tennessee's 7th congressional district, following the resignation of U.S. representative Mark Green.

== U.S. House of Representatives ==
=== Elections ===
==== 2025 special election ====
Shortly after announcing his campaign, Van Epps received endorsements from both Green and Governor Lee. The 7th district seat, considered a solid Republican district by the Cook Political Report, covers much of Middle Tennessee, including Clarksville, portions of Nashville, and western Williamson County.

In October 2025, President Donald Trump endorsed Van Epps in the Republican primary for the 7th district, describing him as a "MAGA warrior" and a "combat-decorated Army helicopter pilot." Trump's endorsement came four days before the primary election and was followed by the withdrawal of state representative Lee Reeves, who publicly suspended his campaign and endorsed Van Epps.

The Republican primary initially featured 11 candidates, including state representatives Jody Barrett, Gino Bulso, and Reeves, who were considered frontrunners before the endorsement. Following Trump's announcement, most outside spending in the race focused on Van Epps and Barrett.

Van Epps won the Republican primary with 51.6% of the vote on October 7, 2025, and defeated the Democratic nominee Aftyn Behn in the December 2 special election, with 53.9% of the popular vote.

==== 2026 ====
Van Epps is seeking re-election to a full term.

=== Tenure ===
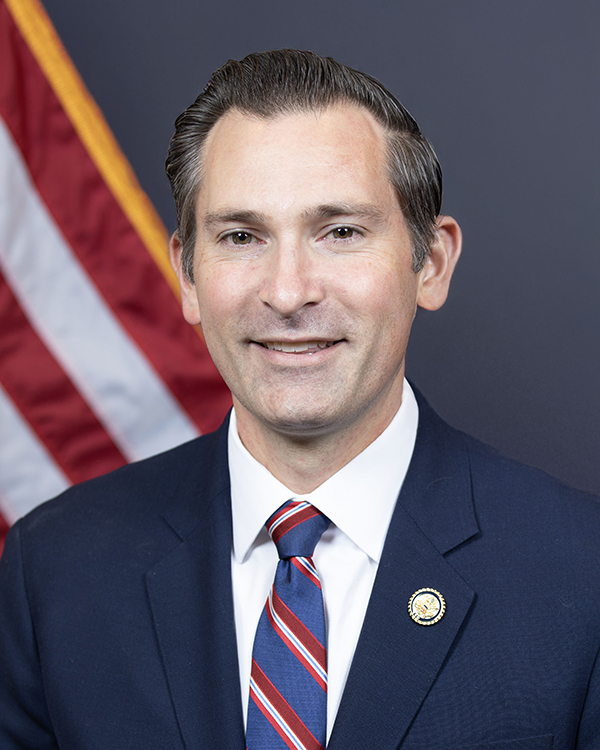
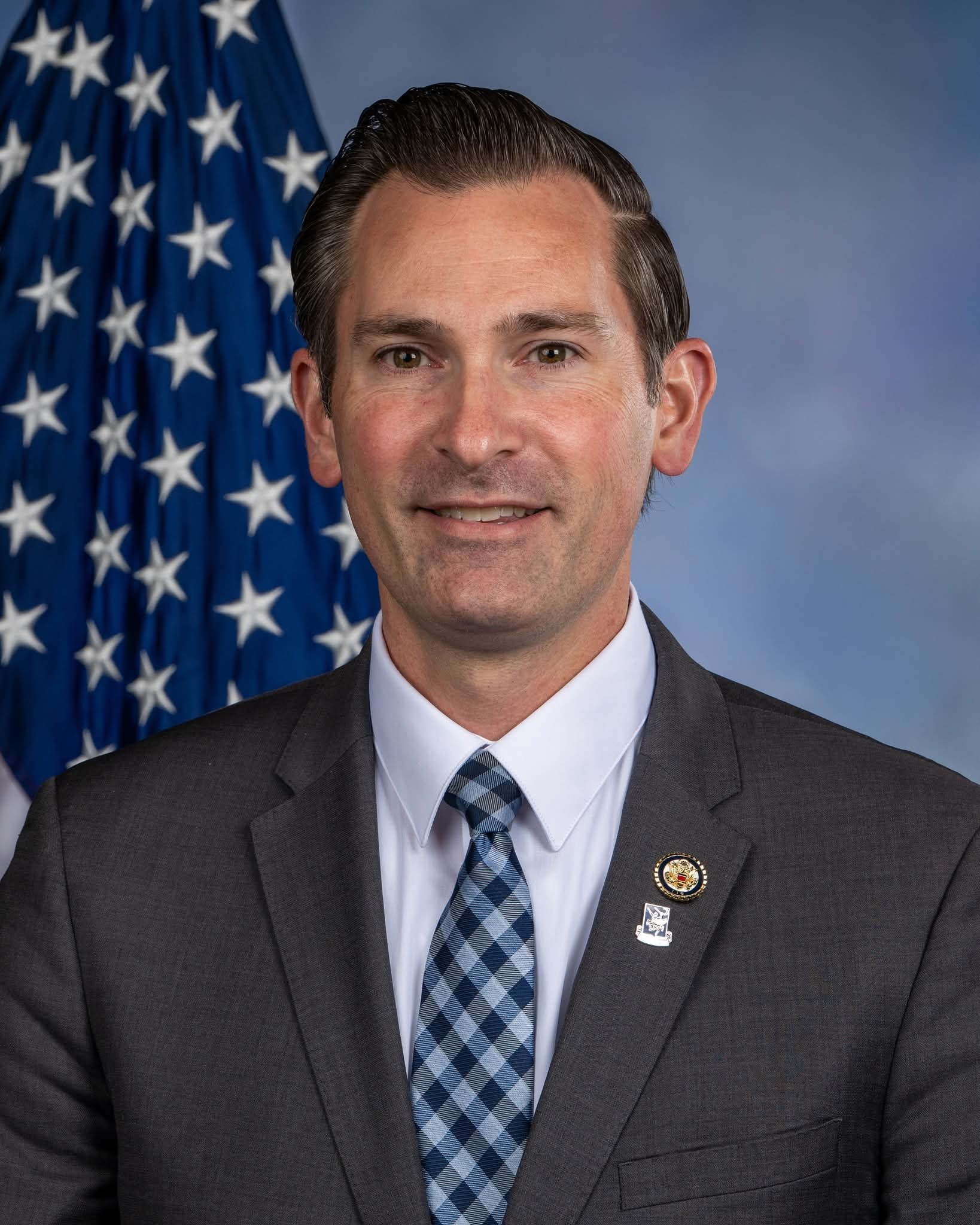
Rep. Van Epps's other official portraits, c. 2025

Van Epps was sworn into office on December 4, 2025.

On December 9, 2025, Van Epps voted to pass the Secure Rural Schools Reauthorization Act of 2025. The act passed overwhelmingly in the chamber, passing in a vote of 399–5. The act extends federal payments to rural counties to support schools, roads, and local services.

==== Committee assignments ====
For the 119th Congress: H.Res. 940

- Committee on Homeland Security
- Committee on Science, Space, and Technology
- Republican Study Committee

== Political positions ==
=== Economic and fiscal policy ===
Van Epps is a self-described "fiscal hawk" and conservative Republican whose platform aligns with the "America First" agenda.

During the 2025 campaign, Van Epps supported the One Big Beautiful Bill Act, a 2025 reconciliation package that extends tax cuts from the Tax Cuts and Jobs Act of 2017, implements welfare reforms, and increases funding for border security.

=== National security and immigration ===
Citing his background as a combat-decorated pilot, Van Epps supports a "Peace Through Strength" foreign policy and has advocated for a robust defense budget. On immigration, he supports the completion of the U.S.–Mexico border wall and has called for the deportation of undocumented immigrants with criminal records.

=== Government reform ===
Van Epps has been critical of "woke" ideologies within the federal bureaucracy and the military. He supports broad deregulation to stimulate small business growth and has called for a reduction in the size of the federal workforce.

=== Education ===
Van Epps supports school choice and federal policies that allow education funding to follow the student to private or charter schools.

=== Healthcare ===
Van Epps has called for reforms to the healthcare system aimed at reducing the cost of prescription drugs through increased market competition. He supports state-level reforms to Medicaid to increase program efficiency and has emphasized a focus on "world-class care" for military veterans. Van Epps has consistently maintained that market-driven solutions and reducing federal bureaucracy are the primary methods for improving healthcare access and affordability.

=== Second Amendment ===
Van Epps identifies as a defender of the Second Amendment and opposes federal measures for stricter gun control.

== Personal life ==
Van Epps lives in Nashville, Tennessee. He and his wife, Meg, have one daughter. Van Epps is a Christian.

== Electoral history ==
Republican primary results
Party	Candidate	Votes	%
Republican	Matt Van Epps	19,006	51.56%
Republican	Jody Barrett	9,337	25.33%
Republican	Gino Bulso	4,005	10.86%
Republican	Lee Reeves (withdrawn)	1,929	5.23%
Republican	Mason Foley	1,022	2.77%
Republican	Stewart Parks	595	1.61%
Republican	Jason Knight	381	1.03%
Republican	Stuart Cooper	239	0.65%
Republican	Tres Wittum	133	0.36%
Republican	Joe Leurs	122	0.33%
Republican	Adolph Dagan	93	0.25%
Total votes		36,862	100.00%

2025 Tennessee's 7th congressional district special election
Party	Candidate	Votes	%	±%
Republican	Matt Van Epps	97,034	53.90%	−5.60
Democratic	Aftyn Behn	81,109	45.06%	+7.01
Independent	Jon Thorp	932	0.52%	N/A
Independent	Terri Christie	610	0.34%	N/A
Independent	Bobby Dodge	198	0.11%	N/A
Independent	Robert Sutherby	129	0.07%	N/A
Total votes		180,012	100.00%	
Republican hold				

U.S. House of Representatives
Preceded by Mark Green	Member of the U.S. House of Representatives from Tennessee's 7th congressional district 2025–present	Incumbent
U.S. order of precedence (ceremonial)
Preceded by Adelita Grijalva	United States representatives by seniority 427th	Succeeded by Christian Menefee
