= Bo Mitchell =

American politician (born 1970)

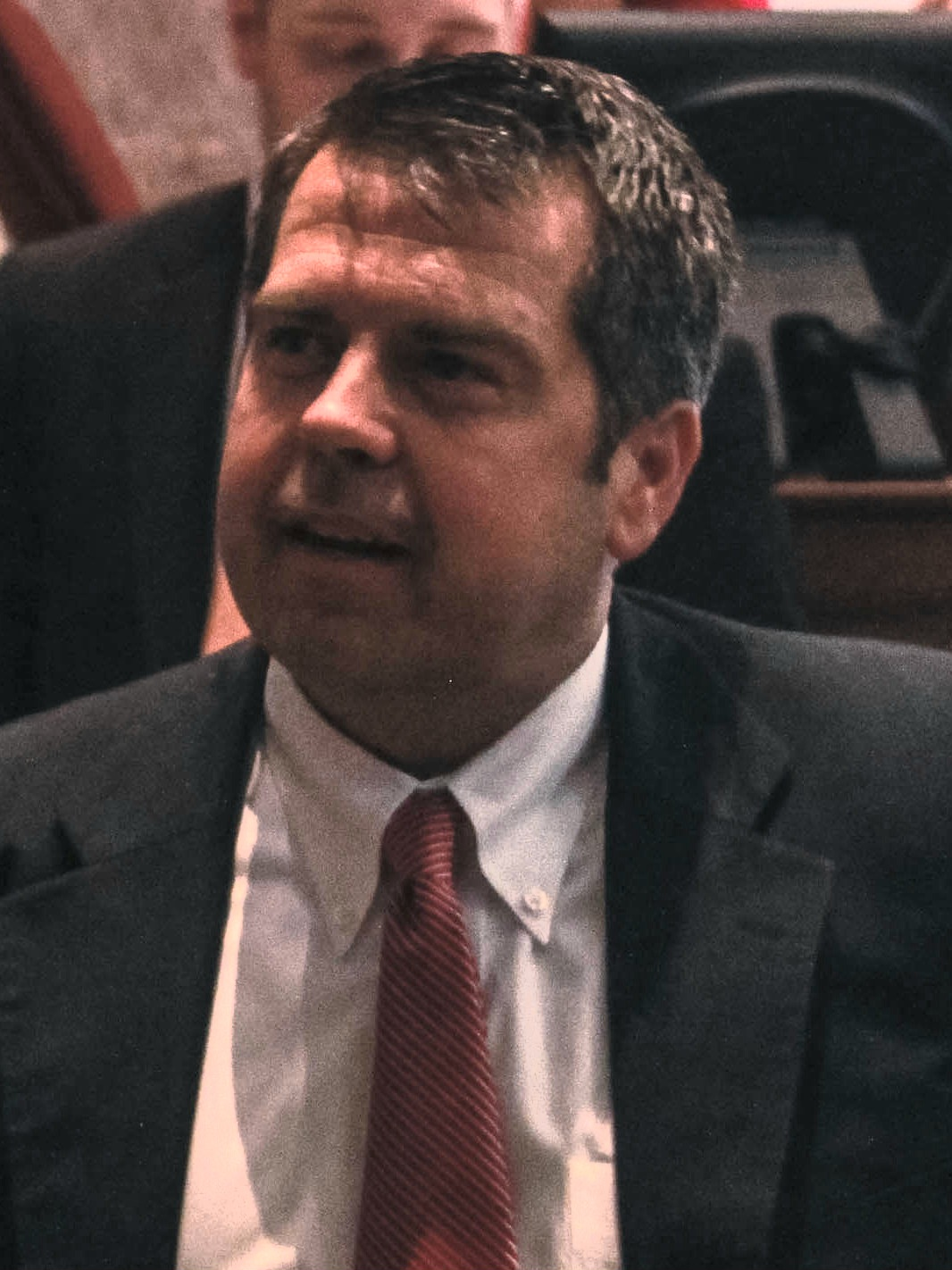

Member of the Tennessee House of Representatives from the 50th district
- Incumbent
- Assumed office January 8, 2013
- Preceded by: Gary Moore

Personal details
- Born: James R. Mitchell; September 5, 1970 (age 56)
- Party: Democratic
- Spouse: Chastity Mitchell
- Children: 2
- Education: Lipscomb University (BA); Nashville School of Law (JD)

James R. "Bo" Mitchell (born September 5, 1970) is an American politician. A member of the Democratic Party, he has represented the 50th district in the Tennessee House of Representatives since 2013, and previously served as a two-term councilman for District 35 in the Nashville Metro Council.

== Education ==
A middle Tennessee native, Mitchell graduated from Dickson County High School in 1988 and obtained a Bachelor of Arts degree in Political Science from David Lipscomb University in 1992. In 2003 he earned a Juris Doctor from the Nashville School of Law.

== Political career ==
=== Early career ===
Mitchell started his career in politics volunteering for the Bill Clinton 1992 presidential campaign. He is a well-known Democratic Party operative in the state of Tennessee. Mitchell has managed campaigns for former Tennessee State Representative Gary Moore and the late Tennessee State Senator Pete Springer along with General Sessions Judge Leon Rubin.

In 2007, Mitchell accepted a position as Director of Community Affairs for former Governor Phil Bredesen.

=== Tennessee House District 69 campaign ===
In 2000, Mitchell ran in the Democratic primary for the 69th district in the Tennessee House of Representatives. The district encompassed Dickson and Hickman counties.

The race was made up of four candidates: Bo Mitchell, David Shepard, James Edward, and Tom Waychoff.

The primary was held on August 3, 2000, Mitchell came in second with 2,586 to Shepard who won with 3,329. Shepard won the subsequent general election in November and would represent the district in the Tennessee General Assembly until 2017.

=== Nashville Metro Council ===
In 2007, Mitchell ran for Nashville Metro Council in District 35, which includes part of Bellevue, Tennessee, winning 56–44. In 2011, he successfully ran for re-election, winning 65-35. Due to term limits in the Metropolitan Charter, Mitchell's second term was his final one, at least consecutively.

In 2012, Mitchell voted against a property tax increase each time it was brought to a vote.

=== Tennessee House District 50 ===
In 2012, Mitchell ran for the Tennessee General Assembly once again, this time in the district to which he had moved following his earlier defeat. His campaign focused primarily on job creation and education. He won the election and was sworn into office on January 8, 2013.

=== U.S. House campaign ===
In July 2025, Mitchell announced he would run in the special election for Tennessee's 7th congressional district. The election was triggered by the resignation of Republican incumbent Mark Green following his yes vote on the final One Big Beautiful Bill Act. Mitchell lost the Democratic primary to fellow state representative Aftyn Behn.

== Personal life ==
Mitchell lives in Bellevue, Tennessee with his wife and their two children. Mitchell worked previously as Regional Director for Health Cost Solutions from 2009-2019 and currently serves as the Principal of Harpeth Benefits, LLC, an independent insurance and employee benefits agency in Nashville.
