= Vincent B. Dixie =

American politician (born 1973)

Vincent Dixie
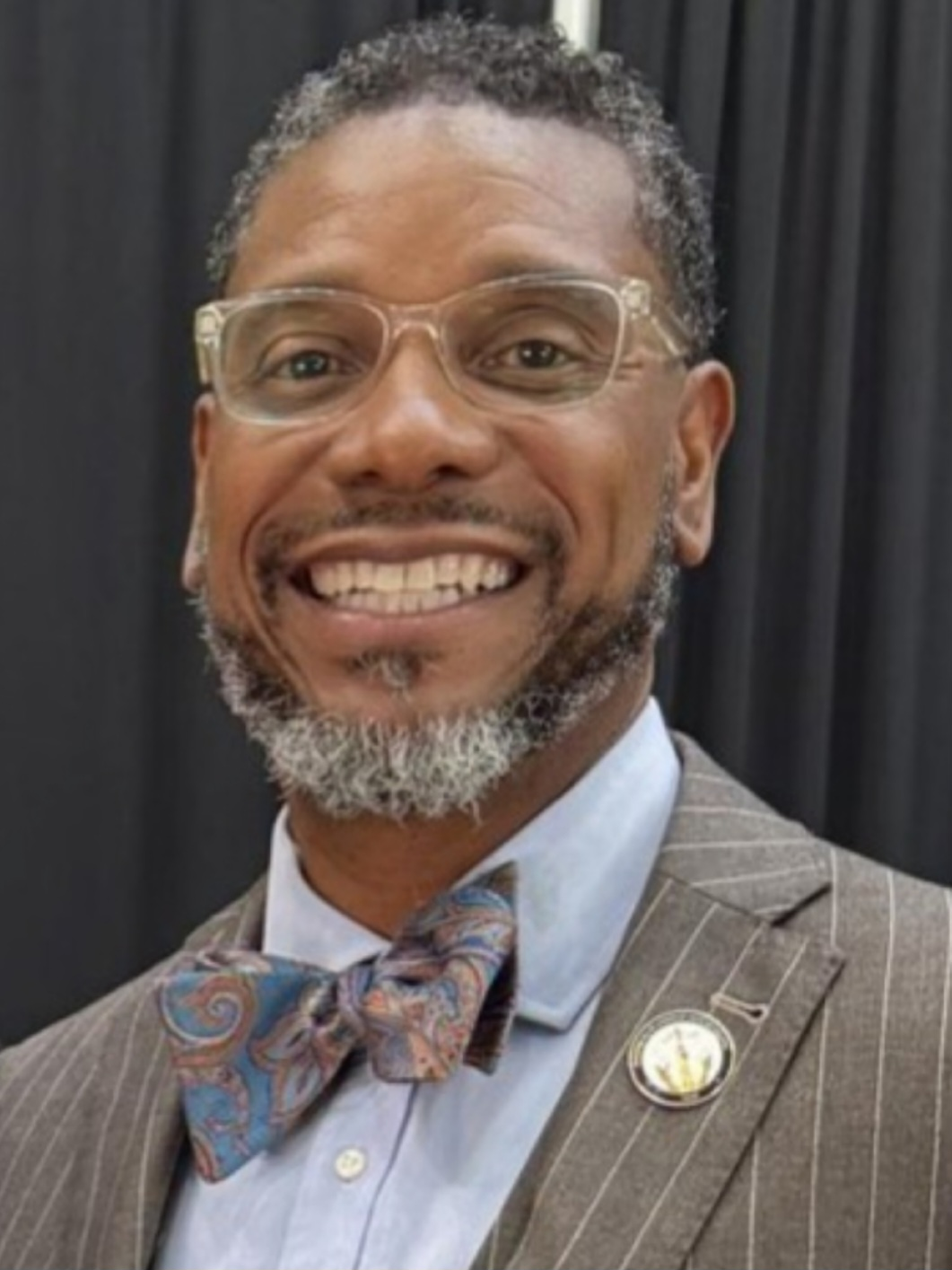
- Dixie in 2025

Member of the Tennessee House of Representatives from the 54th district
- Incumbent
- Assumed office January 8, 2019
- Preceded by: Brenda Gilmore

Personal details
- Born: August 20, 1973 (age 53) Chattanooga, Tennessee, U.S.
- Party: Democratic
- Spouse: Ericka Dixie
- Children: 2
- Education: Tennessee State University (BBA, MBA)

Vincent Bernard Dixie (born August 20, 1973) is an American businessman, politician, and a Democratic member of the Tennessee House of Representatives, representing the 54th district since 2019. He succeeded Brenda Gilmore after she was sworn into the Tennessee Senate.

== Education and early career ==
Dixie attended Tennessee State University where he received his bachelor's degree in Accounting (BBA) in 1997 and a Masters in Business Administration (MBA) in 2004. In 2009, he founded the bail bonding companies A Way Out Bonding and Bail U Out Bonding. Prior to this he worked in the health care industry as an international auditor for Hospital Corporation of America and Ardent Health Services.

== Political campaigns ==
In November 2024, Dixie announced he would run to be party chair of the Tennessee Democratic Party. During the election by the state executive committee in January 2025, he withdrew after the first round of voting.

In July 2025, Dixie announced he would run in the special election for Tennessee's 7th congressional district. The election was triggered by the resignation of Republican incumbent Mark Green following his yes vote on the final One Big Beautiful Bill Act. Dixie lost the Democratic primary to fellow state representative Aftyn Behn.

== Legislative committees ==
Dixie currently serves as a member of the following legislative committees:

- Education Committee
  - K–12 Subcommittee
- Health Committee
  - Public Health Subcommittee

== Political positions and sponsored bills ==
=== Criminal justice ===
Dixie sponsored HB 0883, a bill which allows felons who have gone at least five years without incident the opportunity to petition to have their criminal history sealed. He also sponsored HB 0881, a bill called the "Drug Treatment Instead of Incarceration Act".

=== Education ===
Dixie sponsored HB1550 to delete the "Tennessee Education Savings Account Pilot Program", a school voucher program for low- and middle-income students.

=== Health care ===
Dixie sponsored the following bills in relation to health including HB 887, which is the "Prescription Drug Fair Pricing Act", HB 1259, which will expand Medicaid eligibility to people who have an opioid addiction and make less than the Federal poverty level, in the duration of their active involvement at any approved substance abuse treatment facility.

=== Gun rights ===
Dixie has consistently received "F" ratings from the NRA Political Victory Fund in regards to his gun rights positions.

== Personal life ==
Dixie and his wife Ericka have two daughters: Noelle and Hannah Marie. He attends St. Vincent de Paul Catholic Church where he serves as a member of the church's finance committee.

Others community involvements are:

- member, Omega Psi Phi fraternity
- member, National Association of Black Accountants
- member, Tennessee Association of Professional Bail Agents
- knight/ member, Knights of Peter Claver
- fellow/ co-chair, New Leaders Council Nashville Chapter
- House Member, 111th General Assembly
- Democratic Caucus Treasurer

== Electoral history ==
2018 Tennessee House of Representatives 54th district election
Party	Candidate	Votes	%
Democratic	Vincent Dixie	18,194	84.1
Independent	John Smith	3,428	15.9
Total votes		21,622	100.0

2020 Tennessee House of Representatives 54th district election
Party	Candidate	Votes	%
Democratic	Vincent Dixie (incumbent)	24,619	100.0
Total votes		24,619	100.0

2022 Tennessee House of Representatives 54th district election
Party	Candidate	Votes	%
Democratic	Vincent Dixie (incumbent)	13,955	100.0
Total votes		13,955	100.0

2024 Tennessee House of Representatives 54th district election
Party	Candidate	Votes	%
Democratic	Vincent Dixie (incumbent)	22,893	100.0
Total votes		22,893	100.0
