= Tennessee's 19th Senate district =

American legislative district

Tennessee's 19th State Senate district
Senator
Charlane Oliver; D–Goodlettsville
- Demographics: 30% White; 51% Black; 11% Hispanic; 2% Asian; 1% Other; 5% Multiracial
- Population (2022): 218,816

Tennessee's 19th Senate district is one of 33 districts in the Tennessee Senate. It has been represented by Democrat Charlane Oliver since 2023, succeeding fellow Democrat Brenda Gilmore.

== Geography ==
District 19 is based in downtown Nashville, covering some or all of North Nashville, Antioch, East Nashville, Madison, and Goodlettsville. The district, located in Davidson County, is the only majority-Black Senate district in the state outside of Memphis.

The district is located within Tennessee's 5th, 6th, and 7th congressional districts.

== Recent election results ==
Tennessee Senators are elected to staggered four-year terms, with odd-numbered districts holding elections in midterm years and even-numbered districts holding elections in presidential years.

=== 2018 ===
2018 Tennessee Senate election, District 19
Primary election
Party	Candidate	Votes	%
Democratic	Brenda Gilmore	13,885	64.7
Democratic	Howard Jones	5,262	24.5
Democratic	Sandra Moore	1,181	5.5
Democratic	George Thomas	1,132	5.3
Total votes		21,460	100
General election
Democratic	Brenda Gilmore	49,586	85.8
Independent	Christina Callaway	6,271	10.8
Independent	Rueben Dockery	1,926	3.3
Total votes		57,802	100
Democratic hold			

=== 2014 ===
2014 Tennessee Senate election, District 19
Primary election
Party	Candidate	Votes	%
Democratic	Thelma Harper (incumbent)	10,520	86.2
Democratic	Brandon Puttbrese	1,685	13.8
Total votes		12,205	100
General election
Democratic	Thelma Harper (incumbent)	23,235	75.3
Republican	Sterlina Inez Brady	4,701	15.2
Independent	George Thomas	2,899	9.4
Write in	Rueben (Dock) Dockery	38	0.1
Total votes		30,873	100
Democratic hold			

=== Federal and statewide results ===
Year	Office	Results
2020	President	Biden 77.4 – 18.7%
2016	President	Clinton 79.5 – 16.4%
2012	President	Obama 82.0 – 16.5%
2012	Senate	Clayton 70.3 – 23.3%
