= Jody Barrett =

American politician (born 1973)

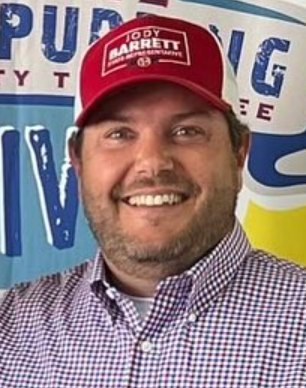

Member of the Tennessee House of Representatives from the 69th district
- Incumbent
- Assumed office January 10, 2023
- Preceded by: Michael G. Curcio

Personal details
- Born: Joseph Michael Barrett; November 8, 1973 (age 53) Bon Aqua, Tennessee, U.S.
- Party: Republican
- Spouse: Holly (m. 1996)
- Children: 3
- Education: Lincoln Memorial University (BA); University of Mississippi (JD)
- Website: Campaign website

Joseph Michael Barrett (born November 8, 1973) is an American attorney and politician in Tennessee. He is a Republican and has represented the 69th district in the Tennessee House of Representatives since 2023.

== Early life and education ==
Barrett graduated from Dickson County Senior High in 1992, then earned a BA in history from Lincoln Memorial University in 1996 and a JD from the University of Mississippi School of Law in 1999.

== Political career ==
Barrett represents the 69th district in the Tennessee House of Representatives. He voted to expel two colleagues following their protest on the House floor. In 2026, Representative Barrett sponsored HB 570, that would have provided equal justice for the pre-born, removing legal immunity for mothers who end their children's lives by abortion.

=== 2025 Congressional campaign ===
On July 7, 2025, Barrett announced his candidacy for the 2025 Tennessee's 7th congressional district special election following the resignation of Congressman Mark Green. He competed in the Republican primary held on October 7, 2025, but lost to Matt Van Epps, who advanced to the general election scheduled for December 2, 2025.

== Personal life ==
Barrett is married to Holly Barrett, and they have two children. He is a Baptist.
