= Tennessee House of Representatives 69th district =

State legislative district in Tennessee

Tennessee's 69th State House of Representatives district
- Map of Tennessee House districts with the 69th District shaded in red
Representative
Jody Barrett; R–Dickson
since 2023
- Demographics: 89.7% White; 2.3% Black; 3.6% Hispanic; 0.2% Asian; 3.7% Multiracial
- Population (2024): 69,050

The Tennessee House of Representatives 69th district is one of the 99 legislative districts in the lower house of the Tennessee General Assembly. The district is located in Middle Tennessee and covers Hickman, Lewis, and part of Dickson counties. The district includes Hohenwald, Centerville, Charlotte, and part of Dickson. The rest of the district is unincorporated and mostly rural. Jody Barrett has represented the district since 2023.

== Demographics ==
The Tennessee Comptroller estimates the population as of 2024 at 69,050.

- 89.7% of the district is White
- 3.6% of the district is Hispanic
- 2.3% of the district is Black
- 0.2% of the district is Asian
- 3.7% of the district is Two or more races

Detailed demographic information is also available through Census Reporter.

== History ==
The 88th Tennessee General Assembly was the first in which all districts were numbered. At this time, the 69th district was in Dickson, Hickman, Humphreys and Lewis counties. From the 89th-90th GAs, it was composed of Dickson, Hickman, and Lewis counties. From the 91st-92nd, it was composed of Dickson, Hickman, Humphreys, and Lewis counties. During the 93rd, it was composed of Dickson, Hickman and Humphreys counties. From the 94th-107th GAs, it was in Dickson and Hickman counties. From the 108th-112th GAs, it was composed of Hickman, and parts of Maury and Dickson counties. Since the 113th General Assembly, it has been composed of Hickman, Lewis, and part of Dickson counties.

== List of Representatives ==
Representative	Party	Years of Service	General Assembly	Hometown
Jody Barrett	Republican	2023-present	113th-114th	Dickson
Brian Ragan	Republican	2021-2022	112th	Dickson
Michael Curcio	Republican	2017-2020	110th-111th	Dickson
David Shepard	Democratic	2001-2016	102nd-109th	Dickson
Douglas S. Jackson	Democratic	1987-2000	95th-101st	Dickson
Walter M. Work	Democratic	1973-1986	88th-94th	Burns
