= Aftyn Behn =

American politician (born 1989)

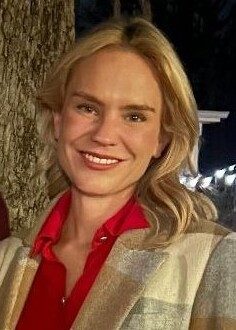
- Behn in 2025

Member of the Tennessee House of Representatives from the 51st district
- Incumbent
- Assumed office October 4, 2023
- Preceded by: Anthony Davis

Personal details
- Born: Aftyn Alyssa Behn; November 24, 1989 (age 36) Knoxville, Tennessee, U.S.
- Party: Democratic
- Education: University of Texas at Austin (BA, MSW)

Aftyn Alyssa Behn (/beɪn/ BAYN; born November 24, 1989) is an American politician who has represented the 51st district of the Tennessee House of Representatives since 2023. Before being elected to office, Behn worked in social services and community advocacy, including serving as a healthcare organizer for the Tennessee Justice Center. She was the Democratic nominee in the 2025 special election for Tennessee's 7th congressional district, and was defeated in the general election by Republican Matt Van Epps.

== Early life and education ==
Behn was born on November 24, 1989, in Knoxville, Tennessee. As a child, she was a Girl Scout and visited the Tennessee House of Representatives chamber; she later earned the organization's highest honor, the Girl Scout Gold Award.

Behn graduated from the Webb School of Knoxville in 2008, completing her high school education. She then attended the University of Texas at Austin and earned bachelor's degrees in liberal arts and psychology in 2012. She went on to complete a master's degree at the Steve Hicks School of Social Work in 2016 with a focus on administration and policy practice, and earned a portfolio certificate from the Texas Center for Disability Studies. During her final year, she completed a practicum in Switzerland at the United Nations High Commission on Refugees.

== Early career ==
Behn began her work as a healthcare community organizer for the Tennessee Justice Center in Nashville in 2017. The next year, she became the lead organizer for Enough is Enough TN, a campaign advocating for the expulsion of state representative David Byrd following accusations of sexual assault against underage girls. In 2019, Behn was removed from the Tennessee House chambers during a protest against Byrd's continued service; she shouted at Speaker Glen Casada and was cited and released from police custody the same day. She remained active in state politics, opposing the 2023 Tennessee House of Representatives expulsions and organizing protests outside the State Capitol.

== Political career ==
=== Tennessee House of Representatives ===
In 2023, after the death of five-term state representative Bill Beck, Behn campaigned in a special election for the 51st district of the Tennessee House of Representatives. The Nashville Metro Council appointed former councilmember Anthony Davis to serve as interim representative until the special election in September. Behn defeated Davis in the August primary with 53.46% of the vote. She won the general election with 75.61% of the vote.

On November 20, 2023, Behn announced her legislative proposal to repeal the Tennessee sales tax on groceries. On June 24, 2024, she and Nashville attorney Rachel Welty filed a lawsuit against the state of Tennessee challenging a law passed during the 2024 legislation that they believe criminalizes certain speech in violation of the First Amendment. A federal judge temporarily blocked the law in September 2024. On December 2, 2024, Behn announced legislation to codify the Equal Rights Amendment in the Tennessee constitution.

In 2024, Behn partnered with Republican Todd Warner to sponsor bipartisan legislation aimed at reforming how the Tennessee General Assembly handles workplace harassment and discrimination complaints. Their bill, House Bill 2533, proposed shifting the investigation process from internal legislative oversight to an independent liaison working with the state attorney general's office. This move was intended to increase transparency and reduce political interference in handling sensitive allegations.

In May 2025, Behn followed ICE around Nashville and filmed herself confronting agents as they conducted their patrols. Federal officials, including U.S. Representative Andy Ogles, accused Behn of obstructing law enforcement operations. Behn had criticized ICE operations in South Nashville that resulted in the arrest of a number of immigrants and said that, according to witnesses, children had been left in vehicles as their mothers were detained.

==== Committee assignments ====
- Agriculture & Natural Resources Committee
- Disaster Relief Committee of Extraordinary Session
- Naming & Designating Committee
- Transportation Committee

=== U.S. House campaign ===
On July 9, 2025, Behn announced she would run in the special election for Tennessee's 7th congressional district. The election was triggered by the resignation of Republican Mark Green, who took a private sector job after voting to pass the One Big Beautiful Bill Act.

Behn defeated fellow state representatives Vincent Dixie and Bo Mitchell, as well as businessman Darden Copeland, in the Democratic primary on October 7, 2025. She was defeated by Republican Matt Van Epps in the general election on December 2, 2025. The campaign was highly publicized, receiving attention from national political leaders from both parties.

== Electoral history ==
Democratic primary results
Party	Candidate	Votes	%
Democratic	Aftyn Behn	8,653	27.89%
Democratic	Darden Copeland	7,720	24.88%
Democratic	Bo Mitchell	7,498	24.17%
Democratic	Vincent Dixie	7,153	23.06%
Total votes		31,024	100.00%

2025 Tennessee's 7th congressional district special election
Party	Candidate	Votes	%	±%
Republican	Matt Van Epps	96,988	53.91%	−5.59
Democratic	Aftyn Behn	81,044	45.05%	+7.00
Independent	Jon Thorp	932	0.52%	N/A
Independent	Terri Christie	610	0.34%	N/A
Independent	Bobby Dodge	196	0.11%	N/A
Independent	Robert Sutherby	129	0.07%	N/A
Total votes		179,899	100.00%	

Tennessee House of Representatives
Preceded by Anthony Davis	Member of the Tennessee House of Representatives from the 51st district 2023–present	Incumbent
