= Gino Bulso =

American politician (born 1961)

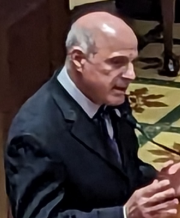
- Bulso in 2023

Member of the Tennessee House of Representatives from the 61st district
- Incumbent
- Assumed office January 10, 2023
- Preceded by: Brandon Ogles

Personal details
- Born: December 25, 1961 (age 64)
- Party: Republican
- Children: 5
- Education: Cornell College, BPh (1983); Emory University School of Law, JD (1986)

Gino Bulso (born December 25, 1961) is an American politician representing the 61st district in the Tennessee House of Representatives. Bulso is a managing partner of Bulso, PLC in Brentwood. He is a member of the Republican Party.

Bulso graduated from Cornell College in 1983 and Emory University Law School in 1986.

As a trial lawyer, Bulso recovered a $146.5 million judgement in Nissan North America v. West Covina Nissan and also worked on U.S. Securities Exchange Commission v. CapWealth Advisors.

From 2019 to 2020, Bulso acted as legal counsel to the Williamson County GOP. Bulso was also the Chairman of the Advisory Committee on Rules of Practice and Procedure for the Tennessee Supreme Court in 2021.

== Tenure ==
Bulso is a member of the Civil Justice Committee, the Education Administration, the Government Operations Committee, the Civil Justice Subcommittee, the Joint Judiciary and Government, and the K-12 Subcommittee.

In 2023, Bulso supported motions to expel three sitting Democratic representatives for from the legislature for violating decorum rules. Protesters were at the capitol voicing their support for gun control, days after the Covenant School shooting. HR 64, the resolution to remove Gloria Johnson, was sponsored by Bulso; the resolution failed by a vote of 65–30. The resolution to remove Justin Jones, HR 65, was sponsored by Bud Hulsey and co-sponsored by Bulso, Andrew Farmer, and Johnny Garrett; it passed with a vote of 72–25.

In 2026, Bulso proposed a set of bills which would restrict the rights of LGBTQ people in the state and challenge the Supreme Court rulings of Obergefell v. Hodges and Bostock v. Clayton County, with the latter being challenged by a bill called the "Banning Bostock Act".

== Personal life ==
Bulso is married and has five children. He is Catholic, and plays tennis competitively.
