= 2026 Tennessee House of Representatives election =

- November 3, 2026

99 Seats in the Tennessee House of Representatives 50 seats needed for a majority
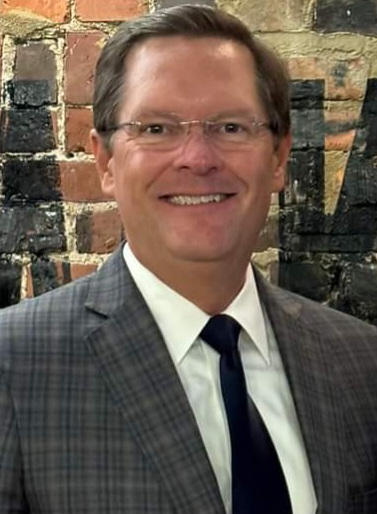

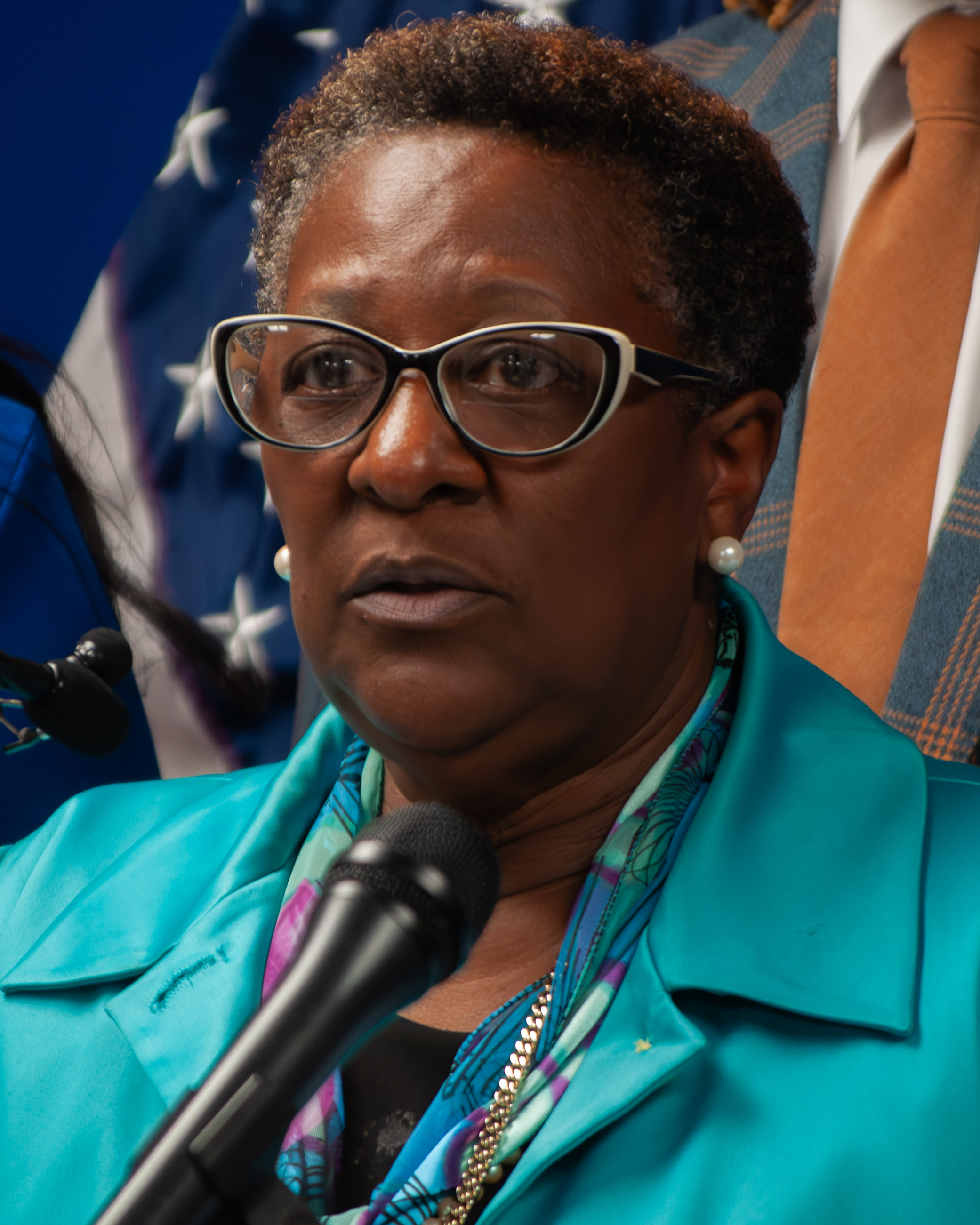
	Majority party	Minority party
Leader	Cameron Sexton	Karen Camper
Party	Republican	Democratic
Leader's seat	25th: Crossville	87th: Memphis
Last election	75 seats	24 seats
Seats before	75	24
Seats won	69	29
Seat change	▼6	▲5
	Third party
Party	Write-in
Seats won	1
- Results by party Republican hold Democratic hold Democratic gain Write-in gain
Speaker of the House before election
Cameron Sexton
Republican
Elected Speaker of the House
TBD

The 2026 Tennessee House of Representatives election was held on November 3, 2026, to elect 99 seats for the Tennessee House of Representatives. The elections coincided with the governor, U.S. Senate, U.S. House, and state senate elections. The primary elections were held on August 6, 2026. Tennessee has open primaries, meaning that any voter can choose to vote on either a Republican or Democratic ballot during primary elections.

== Partisan background ==
In the 2024 presidential election in Tennessee, Republican Donald Trump won 75 of the 99 state house districts, while Democrat Kamala Harris won 24. Going into the 2026 elections, Republicans hold 75 seats in the Tennessee House of Representatives, while Democrats hold 24.

2024 presidential data by house district Trump: 50–60%; 60–70%; 70–80%; 80–90%; Harris: 50–60%; 60–70%; 70–80%; 80–90%

=== Crossover districts ===
These districts voted for one party in the 2024 presidential election and another in the 2024 Tennessee House elections.

==== Trump district ====
- District 67: Donald Trump won the district with a margin of 1.8%.

==== Harris district ====
- District 97: Kamala Harris won the district with a margin of 4.9%.

== Retirements ==
=== Republicans ===
Eight Republicans are not seeking re-election:

- District 2: Bud Hulsey is retiring.
- District 8: Jerome Moon is retiring to run for Blount County mayor.
- District 11: Jeremy Faison is retiring.
- District 31: Ron Travis is retiring to run for Rhea County executive.
- District 32: Monty Fritts is retiring to run for governor.
- District 45: Johnny Garrett is retiring to run for Tennessee's 6th congressional district.
- District 78: Mary Littleton is retiring.
- District 81: Debra Moody is retiring.

=== Democrats ===
Four Democrats are not seeing re-election:

- District 59: Caleb Hemmer is retiring.
- District 80: Johnny Shaw is retiring.
- District 84: Joe Towns resigned after being elected as criminal court clerk of Shelby County.
- District 93: T. J. Hardaway is retiring.

== Incumbents defeated ==
=== In primary elections ===
==== Republicans ====
Two Republicans lost renomination.

1. District 1: John Crawford lost renomination to Jessica Means.
2. District 36: Dennis Powers lost renomination to Noah Smith.

==== Democrats ====
One Democrat lost renomination.

1. District 96: Gabby Salinas lost renomination to Telisa Franklin.

=== In general elections ===
Republican incumbents in six districts were defeated by Democrats.

1. District 13: Robert Stevens was defeated by Brett Windrow.
2. District 18: Elaine Davis was defeated by Bryan Goldberg.
3. District 34: Tim Rudd was defeated by Owen Farnsworth.
4. District 49: Mike Sparks was defeated by Connie Casha.
5. District 75: Michael Lankford was defeated by Allie Phillips.
6. District 97: John Gillespie was defeated by Jesse Huseth.

== Open seats ==
All retiring incumbents were succeeded by members of their own party.

=== Republican seats held by Republicans ===
1. District 2: Won by Gary Stidham.
2. District 8: Won by Jordan Henderson.
3. District 11: Won by Kenny Cody.
4. District 31: Won by Andrew Swafford.
5. District 32: Won by Jack Stockton.
6. District 45: Won by Brian Stewart.
7. District 78: Won by Perry Keenan.
8. District 81: Won by Brett Giannini.

=== Democratic seats held by Democrats ===
1. District 59: Won by Mark Proctor.
2. District 80: Won by Andrea Bond Johnson.
3. District 84: Won by Matthew Szalaj.
4. District 93: Won by John Bradley.

== Predictions ==
Source	Ranking	As of
Sabato's Crystal Ball	Safe R	January 22, 2026
State Navigate	Safe R	October 24, 2026

== Results summary ==
Summary of the November 3, 2026 Tennessee House of Representatives election
Party	Candidates (Note: One candidate per party per seat)	Votes		Seats		
Party	Candidates	No.	%	Up	Won	+/–
Republican	TBD	TBD		75	TBD	
Democratic	TBD	TBD		24	TBD	
Independents	TBD	TBD		0	TBD	
Total		TBD		99		Steady

== Overview ==
District	Incumbent				This race
District	Member	Party	First elected	Status	Candidates
District 1	John Crawford	Republican	2016	Incumbent lost renomination. New member elected. Republican hold.	▌ ✓ Jessica Means (Republican)
District 2	Bud Hulsey	Republican	2014	Incumbent retiring. New member elected. Republican hold.	▌ ✓ Gary Stidham (Republican)
District 3	Timothy Hill	Republican	2012; 2020 (retired); 2023 (appointed)	Incumbent re-elected.	▌ ✓ Timothy Hill (Republican); ▌Lori Love (Democratic)
District 4	Renea Jones	Republican	2024	Incumbent re-elected.	▌ ✓ Renea Jones (Republican)
District 5	David Hawk	Republican	2002	Incumbent re-elected.	▌Catherine Bacon (Democratic); ▌ ✓ David Hawk (Republican)
District 6	Tim Hicks	Republican	2020	Incumbent re-elected.	▌Brad Batt (Democratic); ▌Rodger Broadwater (Independent); ▌ ✓ Tim Hicks (Republican)
District 7	Rebecca Alexander	Republican	2020	Incumbent re-elected.	▌ ✓ Rebecca Alexander (Republican); ▌Sarah Jayne Della Vecchia (Democratic)
District 8	Jerome Moon	Republican	2017 (appointed); 2018	Incumbent retiring. New member elected. Republican hold.	▌ ✓ Jordan Henderson (Republican); ▌Hilary Trudell (Democratic)
District 9	Gary Hicks	Republican	2015 (appointed); 2016	Incumbent re-elected.	▌ ✓ Gary Hicks (Republican)
District 10	Rick Eldridge	Republican	2018	Incumbent re-elected.	▌ ✓ Rick Eldridge (Republican)
District 11	Jeremy Faison	Republican	2010	Incumbent retiring. New member elected. Republican hold.	▌Larry Jeremiah Brown (Independent); ▌ ✓ Kenny Cody (Republican); ▌Sheila Grooms McMahan (Democratic)
District 12	Fred Atchley	Republican	2024	Incumbent re-elected.	▌ ✓ Fred Atchley (Republican)
District 13	Robert Stevens	Republican	2022	Incumbent lost re-election. New member elected. Democratic gain.	▌Robert Stevens (Republican); ▌ ✓ Brett Windrow (Democratic)
District 14	Jason Zachary	Republican	2015 (special)	Incumbent re-elected.	▌Lindsay Young Honaker (Democratic); ▌ ✓ Jason Zachary (Republican)
District 15	Sam McKenzie	Democratic	2020	Incumbent re-elected.	▌ ✓ Sam McKenzie (Democratic)
District 16	Michele Carringer	Republican	2020	Incumbent re-elected.	▌Eliza Boles (Democratic); ▌ ✓ Michele Carringer (Republican)
District 17	Andrew Farmer	Republican	2012	Incumbent re-elected.	▌ ✓ Andrew Farmer (Republican)
District 18	Elaine Davis	Republican	2020	Incumbent lost re-election. New member elected. Democratic gain.	▌Elaine Davis (Republican); ▌ ✓ Bryan Goldberg (Democratic)
District 19	Dave Wright	Republican	2018	Incumbent re-elected.	▌Jenny Fowler (Democratic); ▌ ✓ Dave Wright (Republican)
District 20	Tom Stinnett	Republican	2024	Incumbent re-elected.	▌Jeff Coggin (Independent); ▌Karen Gertz (Democrat); ▌ ✓ Tom Stinnett (Republican)
District 21	Lowell Russell	Republican	2018	Incumbent re-elected.	▌ ✓ Lowell Russell (Republican)
District 22	Dan Howell	Republican	2014	Incumbent re-elected.	▌ ✓ Dan Howell (Republican)
District 23	Mark Cochran	Republican	2018	Incumbent re-elected.	▌Jeremy Bromwell (Independent); ▌ ✓ Mark Cochran (Republican); ▌Jason Hitt (Independent)
District 24	Kevin D. Raper	Republican	2022	Incumbent re-elected.	▌Daniel F. Jones (Democratic); ▌ ✓ Kevin D. Raper (Republican)
District 25	Cameron Sexton	Republican	2010	Incumbent re-elected.	▌Monica Mowdy (Democratic); ▌ ✓ Cameron Sexton (Republican)
District 26	Greg Martin	Republican	2022 (appointed)	Incumbent re-elected.	▌Nathan B. Denton (Democratic); ▌ ✓ Greg Martin (Republican)
District 27	Michele Reneau	Republican	2024	Incumbent re-elected.	▌Paige Quirin (Democratic); ▌ ✓ Michele Reneau (Republican)
District 28	Yusuf Hakeem	Democratic	2018	Incumbent re-elected.	▌Demetrus Coonrod (Independent); ▌ ✓ Yusuf Hakeem (Democratic); ▌Johnny Horne (Independent)
District 29	Greg Vital	Republican	2018	Incumbent re-elected.	▌Ryan V. Scofield (Democratic); ▌ ✓ Greg Vital (Republican)
District 30	Esther Helton-Haynes	Republican	2018	Incumbent re-elected.	▌ ✓ Esther Helton-Haynes (Republican); ▌Art Rymer (Democratic)
District 31	Ron Travis	Republican	2012	Incumbent retiring. New member elected. Republican hold.	▌Keith Nolan (Independent); ▌Randy A. Sharp (Independent); ▌ ✓ Andrew Swafford (Republican); ▌Michael Woodlee (Democratic)
District 32	Monty Fritts	Republican	2012	Incumbent retiring. New member elected. Republican hold.	▌Ali Simpson (Democratic); ▌ ✓ Jack Stockton (Republican)
District 33	Rick Scarbrough	Republican	2024	Incumbent re-elected.	▌Anne Backus (Democratic); ▌ ✓ Rick Scarbrough (Republican)
District 34	Tim Rudd	Republican	2016	Incumbent lost re-election. New member elected. Democratic gain.	▌ ✓ Owen Farnsworth (Democratic); ▌Tim Rudd (Republican)
District 35	William Slater	Republican	2022	Incumbent re-elected.	▌Phil Barnes (Democratic); ▌ ✓ William Slater (Republican)
District 36	Dennis Powers	Republican	2010	Incumbent lost renomination. New member elected. Republican hold.	▌ ✓ Noah Smith (Republican)
District 37	Charlie Baum	Republican	2022	Incumbent re-elected.	▌ ✓ Charlie Baum (Republican); ▌Mary Ann Young (Democratic)
District 38	Kelly Keisling	Republican	2022	Incumbent re-elected.	▌ ✓ Kelly Keisling (Republican); ▌Seth McMillan (Democratic)
District 39	Iris Rudder	Republican	2018	Incumbent re-elected.	▌ ✓ Iris Rudder (Republican)
District 40	Michael Hale	Republican	2022	Incumbent re-elected.	▌ ✓ Michael Hale (Republican); ▌Daniel T. Hawthorne (Democratic)
District 41	Ed Butler	Republican	2022	Incumbent re-elected.	▌ ✓ Ed Butler (Republican); ▌R. Jason Goodman (Democratic)
District 42	Ryan Williams	Republican	2010	Incumbent re-elected.	▌Trenton Tyler Strode (Democratic); ▌ ✓ Ryan Williams (Republican)
District 43	Paul Sherrell	Republican	2016	Incumbent re-elected.	▌Samantha Petit (Democratic); ▌ ✓ Paul Sherrell (Republican)
District 44	William Lamberth	Republican	2012	Incumbent re-elected.	▌Jennifer J. Barton (Republican); ▌ ✓ William Lamberth (Republican)
District 45	Johnny Garrett	Republican	2018	Incumbent retiring. New member elected. Republican hold.	▌Mandy Cook (Democratic); ▌ ✓ Brian Stewart (Republican)
District 46	Clark Boyd	Republican	2018	Incumbent re-elected.	▌ ✓ Clark Boyd (Republican); ▌Dominic Howard (Democratic)
District 47	Rush Bricken	Republican	2018	Incumbent re-elected.	▌ ✓ Rush Bricken (Republican); ▌Mike Stein (Democratic)
District 48	Bryan Terry	Republican	2018	Incumbent re-elected.	▌Matt Ferry (Democratic); ▌ ✓ Bryan Terry (Republican)
District 49	Mike Sparks	Republican	2010	Incumbent lost re-election. New member elected. Democratic gain.	▌ ✓ Connie Casha (Democratic); ▌Mike Sparks (Republican)
District 50	Bo Mitchell	Democratic	2012	Incumbent re-elected.	▌ ✓ Bo Mitchell (Democratic)
District 51	Aftyn Behn	Democratic	2023 (special)	Incumbent re-elected.	▌ ✓ Aftyn Behn (Democratic)
District 52	Justin Jones	Democratic	2022	Incumbent re-elected.	▌Martez Coleman (Independent); ▌ ✓ Justin Jones (Democratic); ▌Michele Vetter (Republican)
District 53	Jason Powell	Democratic	2012	Incumbent re-elected.	▌ ✓ Jason Powell (Democratic)
District 54	Vincent B. Dixie	Democratic	2018	Incumbent re-elected.	▌ ✓ Vincent B. Dixie (Democratic)
District 55	John Ray Clemmons	Democratic	2014	Incumbent re-elected.	▌ ✓ John Ray Clemmons (Democratic); ▌Jayla Thomas (Republican)
District 56	Bob Freeman	Democratic	2012	Incumbent re-elected.	▌ ✓ Bob Freeman (Democratic)
District 57	Susan Lynn	Republican	2012	Incumbent re-elected.	▌Matt Burchfield (Democratic); ▌ ✓ Susan Lynn (Republican)
District 58	Harold M. Love Jr.	Democratic	2012	Incumbent re-elected.	▌ ✓ Harold M. Love Jr. (Democratic)
District 59	Caleb Hemmer	Democratic	2022	Incumbent retiring. New member elected. Democratic hold.	▌Bill Hancock (Republican); ▌ ✓ Mark Proctor (Democratic)
District 60	Shaundelle Brooks	Democratic	2024	Incumbent re-elected.	▌ ✓ Shaundelle Brooks (Democratic); ▌Eva Angelina Romero (Republican)
District 61	Gino Bulso	Republican	2022	Incumbent re-elected.	▌ ✓ Gino Bulso (Republican); ▌Becca Ripley (Democratic)
District 62	Pat Marsh	Republican	2009 (special)	Incumbent re-elected.	▌Brieanna L. Akers (Democratic); ▌ ✓ Pat Marsh (Republican)
District 63	Jake McCalmon	Republican	2022	Incumbent re-elected.	▌Laura Andreson (Democratic); ▌ ✓ Jake McCalmon (Republican)
District 64	Scott Cepicky	Republican	2018	Incumbent re-elected.	▌ ✓ Scott Cepicky (Republican); ▌Craig D'Apolito (Democratic)
District 65	Lee Reeves	Republican	2024	Incumbent re-elected.	▌Julian Pierre-Griffin (Democratic); ▌ ✓ Lee Reeves (Republican)
District 66	Sabi "Doc" Kumar	Republican	2014	Incumbent re-elected.	▌Tamara Bavendam (Democratic); ▌ ✓ Sabi "Doc" Kumar (Republican)
District 67	Ronnie Glynn	Democratic	2022	Incumbent re-elected.	▌ ✓ Ronnie Glynn (Democratic); ▌Chris Lanier (Republican)
District 68	Aron Maberry	Republican	2024	Incumbent re-elected.	▌ ✓ Aron Maberry (Republican); ▌Garfield Scott (Democratic)
District 69	Jody Barrett	Republican	2022	Incumbent re-elected.	▌ ✓ Jody Barrett (Republican); ▌Rachael Murray (Democratic)
District 70	Clay Doggett	Republican	2018	Incumbent re-elected.	▌ ✓ Clay Doggett (Republican); ▌Rayanne Moos (Democratic)
District 71	Kip Capley	Republican	2022	Incumbent re-elected.	▌ ✓ Kip Capley (Republican); ▌Matt Day (Democratic)
District 72	Kirk Haston	Republican	2018	Incumbent re-elected.	▌ ✓ Kirk Haston (Republican)
District 73	Chris Todd	Republican	2018	Incumbent re-elected.	▌ ✓ Chris Todd (Republican)
District 74	Jay Reedy	Republican	2014	Incumbent re-elected.	▌ ✓ Jay Reedy (Republican)
District 75	Michael Lankford	Republican	2025 (appointed)	Incumbent lost re-election. New member elected. Democratic gain.	▌Michael Lankford (Republican); ▌ ✓ Allie Phillips (Democratic)
District 76	Tandy Darby	Republican	2020	Incumbent re-elected.	▌ ✓ Tandy Darby (Republican)
District 77	Rusty Grills	Republican	2020	Incumbent re-elected.	▌ ✓ Rusty Grills (Republican); ▌Erin Reid (Independent)
District 78	Mary Littleton	Republican	2012	Incumbent retiring. New member elected. Republican hold.	▌Hillary Capes-Gwinn (Democratic); ▌ ✓ Perry Keenan (Republican)
District 79	Brock Martin	Republican	2022	Incumbent renominated.	▌Kirk D. Carter (Independent); ▌ ✓ Brock Martin (Republican)
District 80	Johnny Shaw	Democratic	2000	Incumbent retiring. New member elected. Democratic hold.	▌ ✓ Andrea Bond Johnson (Democratic); ▌Julian A. McTizic (Republican)
District 81	Debra Moody	Republican	2012	Incumbent retiring. New member elected. Republican hold.	▌ ✓ Brett Giannini (Republican)
District 82	Chris Hurt	Republican	2018	Incumbent re-elected.	▌ ✓ Chris Hurt (Republican)
District 83	Mark White	Republican	2010	Incumbent re-elected.	▌Margaret Price (Democratic); ▌ ✓ Mark White (Republican)
District 84	Joe Towns	Democratic	1994	Incumbent resigned to become Shelby County criminal court clerk. New member elected. Democratic hold.	▌ ✓ Matthew Szalaj (Democratic)
District 85	Jesse Chism	Democratic	2018	Incumbent re-elected.	▌ ✓ Jesse Chism (Democratic)
District 86	Justin J. Pearson	Democratic	2023 (special)	Incumbent re-elected.	▌ ✓ Justin J. Pearson (Democratic)
District 87	Karen Camper	Democratic	2008	Incumbent re-elected.	▌ ✓ Karen Camper (Democratic); ▌Reggie William Hall (Republican)
District 88	Larry Miller	Democratic	1992	Incumbent re-elected.	▌ ✓ Larry Miller (Democratic)
District 89	Justin Lafferty	Republican	2018	Incumbent renominated.	▌Randy Debord (Democratic); ▌ ✓ Justin Lafferty (Republican)
District 90	Gloria Johnson	Democratic	2012	Incumbent re-elected.	▌ ✓ Gloria Johnson (Democratic)
District 91	Torrey Harris	Democratic	2020	Incumbent re-elected.	▌ ✓ Torrey Harris (Democratic)
District 92	Todd Warner	Republican	2020	Incumbent re-elected.	▌Teri Mai (Democratic); ▌ ✓ Todd Warner (Republican)
District 93	T. J. Hardaway	Democratic	2026 (appointed)	Incumbent retiring. New member elected. Democratic hold.	▌ ✓ John Bradley (Democratic)
District 94	Ron Gant	Republican	2016	Incumbent re-elected.	▌ ✓ Ron Gant (Republican); ▌Francine Johnson (Democratic)
District 95	Kevin Vaughan	Republican	2017 (special)	Incumbent re-elected.	▌ ✓ Kevin Vaughan (Republican)
District 96	Gabby Salinas	Democratic	2022	Incumbent lost renomination. New member elected. Democratic hold.	▌ ✓ Telisa Franklin (Democratic)
District 97	John Gillespie	Republican	2020	Incumbent lost re-election. New member elected. Democratic gain.	▌John Gillespie (Republican); ▌ ✓ Jesse Huseth (Democratic)
District 98	Antonio Parkinson	Democratic	2011 (special)	Incumbent re-elected.	▌ ✓ Antonio Parkinson (Democratic)
District 99	Tom Leatherwood	Republican	2018	Incumbent re-elected.	▌ ✓ Tom Leatherwood (Republican); ▌William P. Mouzon (Independent)

=== District 1 ===
District 1 election
Nominee	Jessica Means
Party	Republican
Incumbent Representative
John Crawford
Republican

The 1st district is located in East Tennessee and consists of the northern half of Sullivan County along the Tennessee-Virginia border. It includes parts of the cities of Kingsport and Bristol. Incumbent Republican John Crawford has represented the district since 2017. He was challenged in the Republican primary by Sullivan County commissioner Jessica Means.

District 1 Republican primary
Party	Candidate	Votes	%
Republican	Jessica Means	4,021	60.97
Republican	John Crawford (incumbent)	2,574	39.03
Total votes		6,595	100.00

=== District 2 ===
District 2 election
Nominee	Gary Stidham
Party	Republican
Incumbent Representative
Bud Hulsey
Republican

The 2nd district is located in East Tennessee in the Tri-Cities area and consists of a western portion of Sullivan County. The district includes all of the city of Blountville and parts of the cities of Kingsport and Bristol. Incumbent Republican Bud Hulsey has represented the district since 2015. Hulsey announced he would not seek re-election.

District 2 Republican primary
Party	Candidate	Votes	%
Republican	Gary Stidham	6,217	100.00
Total votes		6,217	100.00

=== District 3 ===
District 3 election
Nominee	Timothy Hill	Lori Love
Party	Republican	Democratic
Incumbent Representative
Timothy Hill
Republican

The 3rd district is located in East Tennessee and consists of all of Johnson County and parts of Carter, Hawkins, and Sullivan counties. The district includes the cities of Mountain City, Bluff City, and Mount Carmel, as well as the northeasternmost point in the state at the North Carolina–Tennessee–Virginia Corners. Incumbent Republican Timothy Hill has represented the district since 2023.

District 3 Republican primary
Party	Candidate	Votes	%
Republican	Timothy Hill (incumbent)	8,210	100.00
Total votes		8,210	100.00

District 3 Democratic primary
Party	Candidate	Votes	%
Democratic	Lori Love	1,061	100.00
Total votes		1,061	100.00

=== District 4 ===
District 4 election
Nominee	Renea Jones
Party	Republican
Incumbent Representative
Renea Jones
Republican

The 4th district is located in East Tennessee and consists of all of Unicoi County and part of Carter County. It includes the cities of Elizabethton and Erwin. Incumbent Republican Renea Jones has represented the district since 2025.

District 4 Republican primary
Party	Candidate	Votes	%
Republican	Renea Jones (incumbent)	7,793	100.00
Total votes		7,793	100.00

=== District 5 ===
District 5 election
Nominee	David B. Hawk	Catherine Bacon
Party	Republican	Democratic
Incumbent Representative
David B. Hawk
Republican

The 5th district is located in East Tennessee and consists of all of Greene County. It includes the cities of Tusculum and Greeneville. Incumbent Republican David B. Hawk has represented the district since 2003.

District 5 Republican primary
Party	Candidate	Votes	%
Republican	David B. Hawk (incumbent)	7,319	100.00
Total votes		7,319	100.00

District 5 Democratic primary
Party	Candidate	Votes	%
Democratic	Catherine Bacon	1,019	100.00
Total votes		1,019	100.00

=== District 6 ===
District 6 election
Nominee	Tim Hicks	Brad Batt
Party	Republican	Democratic
Incumbent Representative
Tim Hicks
Republican

The 6th district is located in East Tennessee and represents a portion of Washington County, including parts of Johnson City. Incumbent Republican Tim Hicks has represented the district since 2021

District 6 Republican primary
Party	Candidate	Votes	%
Republican	Tim Hicks (incumbent)	7,296	100.00
Total votes		7,296	100.00

District 6 Democratic primary
Party	Candidate	Votes	%
Democratic	Brad Batt	2,437	100.00
Total votes		2,437	100.00

=== District 7 ===
District 7 election
Nominee	Rebecca Alexander	Sarah Jayne Della Vecchia
Party	Republican	Democratic
Incumbent Representative
Rebecca Alexander
Republican

The 7th district is located in East Tennessee and consists of a portion of Washington County, including all of the city of Jonesborough and parts of Johnson City. Incumbent Republican Rebecca Alexander has represented the district since 2021.

District 7 Republican primary
Party	Candidate	Votes	%
Republican	Rebecca Alexander (incumbent)	6,819	100.00
Total votes		6,819	100.00

District 7 Democratic primary
Party	Candidate	Votes	%
Democratic	Sarah Jayne Della Vecchia	2,398	100.00
Total votes		2,398	100.00

=== District 8 ===
District 8 election
Nominee	Jordan Henderson	Hilary Trudell
Party	Republican	Democratic
Incumbent Representative
Jerome Moon
Republican

The 8th district is located in East Tennessee and consists of a portion of Blount County, including all of the cities of Townsend and Walland and parts of Maryville and Alcoa. The district also includes a portion of the Great Smoky Mountains National Park. Incumbent Republican Jerome Moon has represented the district since 2017. Moon is retiring to run for Blount County Mayor.

District 8 Republican primary
Party	Candidate	Votes	%
Republican	Jordan Henderson	5,873	62.39
Republican	Tony Crisp	3,540	37.61
Total votes		9,413	100.00

District 8 Democratic primary
Party	Candidate	Votes	%
Democratic	Hilary Trudell	1,417	64.26
Democratic	Mac Pickle	788	35.74
Total votes		2,205	100.00

=== District 9 ===
District 9 election
Nominee	Gary Hicks
Party	Republican
Incumbent Representative
Gary Hicks
Republican

The 9th district is located in East Tennessee and consists of all of Hancock County and parts of Hawkins and Claiborne counties. The district includes the cities of Harrogate, Tazewell, Rogersville, and Church Hill. Incumbent Republican Gary Hicks has represented the district since 2016.

District 9 Republican primary
Party	Candidate	Votes	%
Republican	Gary Hicks (incumbent)	8,735	100.00
Total votes		8,735	100.00

=== District 10 ===
District 10 election
Nominee	Rick Eldridge
Party	Republican
Incumbent Representative
Rick Eldridge
Republican

The 10th district is located in East Tennessee and consists of all of Grainger County and a portion of Hawkins County. The district includes the cities of Morristown, Rutledge, and Bean Station. Incumbent Republican Rick Eldridge has represented the district since 2019.

District 10 Republican primary
Party	Candidate	Votes	%
Republican	Rick Eldridge (incumbent)	5,872	100.00
Total votes		5,872	100.00

=== District 11 ===
District 11 election
Nominee	Kenny Cody	Sheila Grooms McMahan
Party	Republican	Democratic
Incumbent Representative
Jeremy Faison
Republican

The 11th district is located in East Tennessee and consists of all of Cocke County and portions of Hamblen and Jefferson counties. The district includes all of the cities of Newport, Cosby, and parts of the cities of Jefferson City and Morristown. It also includes a portion of the Great Smoky Mountains National Park. Incumbent Republican Jeremy Faison had represented the district since 2011. Faison announced that he will not seek re-election. Kenny Cody, the former chair of the Cocke County Republican Party, ran to replace him.

District 11 Republican primary
Party	Candidate	Votes	%
Republican	Kenny Cody	7,432	70.81
Republican	Jeff Fancher	3,063	29.19
Total votes		10,495	100.00

District 11 Democratic primary
Party	Candidate	Votes	%
Democratic	Sheila Grooms McMahan	1,076	100.00
Total votes		1,076	100.00

=== District 12 ===
District 12 election
Nominee	Fred Atchley
Party	Republican
Incumbent Representative
Fred Atchley
Republican

The 12th district is located in East Tennessee and consists of a portion of Sevier County, including all of the cities of Gatlinburg, Pittman Center, and Pigeon Forge, part of Sevierville. The district also includes a large portion of the Great Smoky Mountains National Park. Incumbent Republican Fred Atchley has represented the district since 2025.

District 12 Republican primary
Party	Candidate	Votes	%
Republican	Fred Atchley (incumbent)	5,597	100.00
Total votes		5,597	100.00

=== District 13 ===
District 13 election
Nominee	Robert Stevens	Brett Windrow
Party	Republican	Democratic
Incumbent Representative
Robert Stevens
Republican

The 13th district is located in Middle Tennessee and consists of a western strip of Rutherford County and includes portions of the cities of Murfreesboro, Smyrna, La Vergne, and Eagleville. Incumbent Republican Robert Stevens has represented the district since 2023.

District 13 Republican primary
Party	Candidate	Votes	%
Republican	Robert Stevens (incumbent)	4,082	100.00
Total votes		4,082	100.00

District 13 Democratic primary
Party	Candidate	Votes	%
Democratic	Brett Windrow	2,725	100.00
Total votes		2,725	100.00

=== District 14 ===
District 14 election
Nominee	Jason Zachary	Lindsay Young Honaker
Party	Republican	Democratic
Incumbent Representative
Jason Zachary
Republican

The 14th district is located in East Tennessee and consists of a southwestern portion of Knox County. It includes most of the city of Farragut and a small part of Knoxville. Incumbent Republican Jason Zachary has represented the district since 2015.

District 14 Republican primary
Party	Candidate	Votes	%
Republican	Jason Zachary (incumbent)	10,152	100.00
Total votes		10,152	100.00

District 14 Democratic primary
Party	Candidate	Votes	%
Democratic	Lindsay Young Honaker	3,720	80.87
Democratic	Shivam R. Zaveri	880	19.13
Total votes		4,600	100.00

=== District 15 ===
District 15 election
Nominee	Sam McKenzie
Party	Democratic
Incumbent Representative
Sam McKenzie
Democratic

The 15th district is located in East Tennessee and consists of several neighborhoods in the city of Knoxville, which is in Knox County. It includes Downtown Knoxville, East Knoxville, most of the University of Tennessee, and parts of North Knoxville and South Knoxville. Incumbent Democrat Sam McKenzie has represented the district since 2021.

District 15 Democratic primary
Party	Candidate	Votes	%
Democratic	Sam McKenzie (incumbent)	4,762	100.00
Total votes		4,762	100.00

=== District 16 ===
District 16 election
Nominee	Michele Carringer	Eliza Boles
Party	Republican	Democratic
Incumbent Representative
Michele Carringer
Republican

The 16th district is located in East Tennessee and consists of a portion of northwestern Knox County, including the communities of Powell, Halls Crossroads, Heiskell, and a part of North Knoxville. Incumbent Republican Michele Carringer has represented the district since 2021.

District 16 Republican primary
Party	Candidate	Votes	%
Republican	Michele Carringer (incumbent)	7,491	100.00
Total votes		7,491	100.00

District 16 Democratic primary
Party	Candidate	Votes	%
Democratic	Eliza Boles	3,438	100.00
Total votes		3,438	100.00

=== District 17 ===
District 7 election
Nominee	Andrew Farmer
Party	Republican
Incumbent Representative
Andrew Farmer
Republican

The 17th district is located in East Tennessee and consists of a western portion of Jefferson County and a northeastern portion of Sevier County. The district includes the communities of New Market, Dandridge, and Strawberry Plains, and parts of Jefferson City and Sevierville. Incumbent Republican Andrew Farmer has represented the district since 2013.

District 17 Republican primary
Party	Candidate	Votes	%
Republican	Andrew Farmer (incumbent)	5,918	100.00
Total votes		5,918	100.00

=== District 18 ===
District 18 election
Nominee	Elaine Davis	Bryan Goldberg
Party	Republican	Democratic
Incumbent Representative
Elaine Davis
Republican

The 18th district is located in East Tennessee and consists of several Knoxville suburbs in southern and western Knox County. The district is situated around I-75 and West Knoxville and includes the communities of Amherst, Cedar Bluff, Rocky Hill, Bearden, Sequoyah Hills, Lakemoor Hills, Topside, Mount Olive, and Bonny Kate. Incumbent Republican Elaine Davis has represented the district since 2023. In 2024, Donald Trump won the district with a margin of 9.5%.

District 18 Republican primary
Party	Candidate	Votes	%
Republican	Elaine Davis (incumbent)	5,254	62.65
Republican	Brent N. Jones	2,760	32.91
Republican	Elliott Schuchardt	372	4.44
Total votes		8,386	100.00

District 18 Democratic primary
Party	Candidate	Votes	%
Democratic	Bryan Goldberg	5,665	100.00
Total votes		5,665	100.00

=== District 19 ===
District 19 election
Nominee	Dave Wright	Jenny Fowler
Party	Republican	Democratic
Incumbent Representative
Dave Wright
Republican

The 19th district is located in East Tennessee and consists of a northeastern portion of Knox County. It is the largest and most rural Tennessee House of Representatives district in the county. The district includes the communities of Corryton, Mascot, Asbury, and Harbison Crossroads, and parts of North Knoxville, Halls Crossroads, South Knoxville, and Strawberry Plains. Incumbent Republican Dave Wright has represented the district since 2019.

District 19 Republican primary
Party	Candidate	Votes	%
Republican	Dave Wright (incumbent)	7,906	100.00
Total votes		7,906	100.00

District 19 Democratic primary
Party	Candidate	Votes	%
Democratic	Jenny Fowler	2,657	100.00
Total votes		2,657	100.00

=== District 20 ===
District 20 election
Nominee	Tom Stinnett	Karen Gertz
Party	Republican	Democratic
Incumbent Representative
Tom Stinnett
Republican

The 20th district is located in East Tennessee and consists of a northwestern portion of Blount County, including parts of the cities of Maryville, Alcoa, and Louisville. Incumbent Republican Tom Stinnett has represented the district since 2025.

District 20 Republican primary
Party	Candidate	Votes	%
Republican	Tom Stinnett (incumbent)	6,617	100.00
Total votes		6,617	100.00

District 20 Democratic primary
Party	Candidate	Votes	%
Democratic	Karen Gertz	2,315	100.00
Total votes		2,315	100.00

=== District 21 ===
District 21 election
Nominee	Lowell Russell
Party	Republican
Incumbent Representative
Lowell Russell
Republican

The 21st district is located in East Tennessee and consists of most of Loudon County and a northern portion of Monroe County, including the communities of Tellico Village, Loudon, Vonore, Madisonville, Greenback, and a small part of Lenoir City. Incumbent Republican Lowell Russell has represented the district since 2019.

District 21 Republican primary
Party	Candidate	Votes	%
Republican	Lowell Russell (incumbent)	9,669	100.00
Total votes		9,669	100.00

=== District 22 ===
District 22 election
Nominee	Dan Howell
Party	Republican
Incumbent Representative
Dan Howell
Republican

The 22nd district is located in East Tennessee and consists of all of Meigs and Polk counties and most of Bradley County surrounding the city of Cleveland. It includes the communities of Charleston, Decatur, Benton, Ten Mile, and Ducktown, as well as the intersection of the borders of Tennessee, Georgia, and North Carolina. Incumbent Republican Dan Howell has represented the district since 2013.

District 22 Republican primary
Party	Candidate	Votes	%
Republican	Dan Howell (incumbent)	8,404	100.00
Total votes		8,404	100.00

=== District 23 ===
District 23 election
Nominee	Mark Cochran	Jeremy Bromwell	Jason Hitt
Party	Republican	Independent	Independent
Incumbent Representative
Rebecca Alexander
Republican

The 23rd district is located in East Tennessee and consists of all of McMinn County and a large southern portion of Monroe County. The district includes the communities of Tellico Plains, Englewood, Niota, and Etowah. It also includes a large section of Cherokee National Forest on the Tennessee-North Carolina border. Incumbent Republican Mark Cochran has represented the district since 2019.

District 23 Republican primary
Party	Candidate	Votes	%
Republican	Mark Cochran (incumbent)	5,214	63.30
Republican	Will Bolton	3,023	36.70
Total votes		8,237	100.00

=== District 24 ===
District 24 election
Nominee	Kevin Raper	Daniel Jones
Party	Republican	Democratic
Incumbent Representative
Kevin Raper
Republican

The 24th district is located in East Tennessee and consists of the city Cleveland and some of the surrounding communities in central Bradley County. Incumbent Republican Kevin Raper has represented the district since 2023.

District 24 Republican primary
Party	Candidate	Votes	%
Republican	Kevin Raper (incumbent)	5,693	100.00
Total votes		5,693	100.00

District 24 Democratic primary
Party	Candidate	Votes	%
Democratic	Daniel Jones	1,319	100.00
Total votes		1,319	100.00

=== District 25 ===
District 25 election
Nominee	Cameron Sexton	Monica Mowdy
Party	Republican	Democratic
Incumbent Representative
Cameron Sexton
Republican

The 25th district is located between East and Middle Tennessee and consists of all of Cumberland County and the eastern half of Putnam County. The district includes the cities of Crossville, Fairfield Glade, Lake Tansi, and Monterey. Incumbent Republican Speaker of the Tennessee House of Representatives Cameron Sexton has represented the district since 2011.

District 25 Republican primary
Party	Candidate	Votes	%
Republican	Cameron Sexton (incumbent)	11,591	100.00
Total votes		11,591	100.00

District 25 Democratic primary
Party	Candidate	Votes	%
Democratic	Monica Mowdy	1,657	100.00
Total votes		1,657	100.00

=== District 26 ===
District 26 election
Nominee	Greg Martin	Nathan Denton
Party	Republican	Democratic
Incumbent Representative
Greg Martin
Republican

The 26th district is located in East Tennessee and consists of a central strip of Hamilton County running from Sale Creek in the north, through Middle Valley, Lakesite, and Harrison, down to downtown Chattanooga in the south. Incumbent Republican Greg Martin has represented the district since 2023.

District 26 Republican primary
Party	Candidate	Votes	%
Republican	Greg Martin (incumbent)	8,821	100.00
Total votes		8,821	100.00

District 26 Democratic primary
Party	Candidate	Votes	%
Democratic	Nathan Denton	2,517	51.73
Democratic	Lucian LaFae	2,349	48.27
Total votes		4,866	100.00

=== District 27 ===
District 27 election
Nominee	Michele Reneau	Paige Quirin
Party	Republican	Democratic
Incumbent Representative
Michele Reneau
Republican

The 27th district is located in East Tennessee and consists of a western strip of Hamilton County running from Sale Creek in the north, through Soddy-Daisy, Signal Mountain, Red Bank, and parts of western Chattanooga, down to Lookout Mountain on the Tennessee-Georgia border in the south. Incumbent Republican Michele Reneau has represented the district since 2025.

District 27 Republican primary
Party	Candidate	Votes	%
Republican	Michele Reneau (incumbent)	6,030	58.30
Republican	Tony Hullender	4,313	41.70
Total votes		10,343	100.00

District 27 Democratic primary
Party	Candidate	Votes	%
Democratic	Paige Quirin	4,726	100.00
Total votes		4,726	100.00

=== District 28 ===
District 28 election
Nominee	Yusuf Hakeem	Demetrus Coonrod	Johnny Horne
Party	Democratic	Independent	Independent
Incumbent Representative
Yusuf Hakeem
Democratic

The 28th district is located in East Tennessee and consists of most of downtown Chattanooga in Hamilton County. Incumbent Democrat Yusuf Hakeem has represented the district since 2019.

District 28 Democratic primary
Party	Candidate	Votes	%
Democratic	Yusuf Hakeem (incumbent)	6,936	100.00
Total votes		6,936	100.00

=== District 29 ===
District 29 election
Nominee	Greg Vital	Ryan Scofield
Party	Republican	Democratic
Incumbent Representative
Greg Vital
Republican

The 29th district is located in East Tennessee and consists of an eastern strip of Hamilton County running from Birchwood in the north, through Harrison, down to Collegedale and eastern Chattanooga in the south. Incumbent Republican Greg Vital has represented the district since 2021.

District 29 Republican primary
Party	Candidate	Votes	%
Republican	Greg Vital (incumbent)	7,459	100.00
Total votes		7,459	100.00

District 29 Democratic primary
Party	Candidate	Votes	%
Democratic	Ryan Scofield	2,918	100.00
Total votes		2,918	100.00

=== District 30 ===
District 30 election
Nominee	Esther Helton-Haynes	Art Rymer
Party	Republican	Democratic
Incumbent Representative
Esther Helton-Haynes
Republican

The 30th district is located in East Tennessee and consists of a southern strip of Hamilton County along the Tennessee-Georgia border, running from Apison in the east, through Collegedale and East Ridge, over to Chattanooga in the west. Incumbent Republican Esther Helton-Haynes has represented the district since 2019.

District 30 Republican primary
Party	Candidate	Votes	%
Republican	Esther Helton-Haynes (incumbent)	5,630	100.00
Total votes		5,630	100.00

District 30 Democratic primary
Party	Candidate	Votes	%
Democratic	Art Rymer	3,913	100.00
Total votes		3,913	100.00

=== District 31 ===
District 31 election
Nominee	Andy Swafford	Michael Woodlee
Party	Republican	Democratic
Incumbent Representative
Ron Travis
Republican

The 31st district is located between East and Middle Tennessee and consists of the entirety of Rhea, Bledsoe, Van Buren, and Sequatchie counties. The district includes the cities of Spencer, Spring City, Pikeville, Dayton, and Lone Oak. Incumbent Republican Ron Travis had represented the district since 2013. Travis announced that he will not run for re-election and, instead is running for Rhea County executive. Andy Swafford, a member of the Bledsoe County commission, and Bo McCawley, a Rhea County school board member, ran in the Republican primary for this seat.

District 31 Republican primary
Party	Candidate	Votes	%
Republican	Andy Swafford	6,901	57.11
Republican	Harold "Bo" McCawley	5,182	42.89
Total votes		12,083	100.00

District 31 Democratic primary
Party	Candidate	Votes	%
Democratic	Michael Woodlee	1,382	100.00
Total votes		1,382	100.00

=== District 32 ===
District 32 election
Nominee	Jack Stockton	Ali Simpson
Party	Republican	Democratic
Incumbent Representative
Monty Fritts
Republican

The 32nd district is located in East Tennessee and consists of most of Roane County and a small part of northeastern Loudon County. The district includes most of Lenoir City, all of Kingston, Harriman, and Rockwood, and the Roane County portion of Oak Ridge. Additionally, district is home to Oak Ridge National Laboratory. Incumbent Republican Monty Fritts had represented the district since 2023. Fritts announced that he will not seek re-election and is retiring to run for governor.

District 32 Republican primary
Party	Candidate	Votes	%
Republican	Jack Stockton	6,483	59.84
Republican	Melissa Browder	3,808	35.15
Republican	Paul Suarez	543	5.01
Total votes		10,834	100.00

District 32 Democratic primary
Party	Candidate	Votes	%
Democratic	Ali Simpson	2,043	100.00
Total votes		2,043	100.00

=== District 33 ===
District 33 election
Nominee	Rick Scarbrough	Anne Backus
Party	Republican	Democratic
Incumbent Representative
Rick Scarbrough
Republican

The 33rd district is located in East Tennessee and consists of most of Anderson County. The district includes all of Briceville, most of Clinton, roughly half of Rocky Top, and the Anderson County portions of Oak Ridge and Oliver Springs. Incumbent Republican Rick Scarbrough has represented the district since 2025.

District 33 Republican primary
Party	Candidate	Votes	%
Republican	Rick Scarbrough (incumbent)	6,347	100.00
Total votes		6,347	100.00

District 33 Democratic primary
Party	Candidate	Votes	%
Democratic	Anne Backus	2,162	62.00
Democratic	Kelly McCampbell	1,325	38.00
Total votes		3,487	100.00

=== District 34 ===
District 34 election
Nominee	Tim Rudd	Owen Farnsworth
Party	Republican	Democratic
Incumbent Representative
Tim Rudd
Republican

The 34th district is located in Middle Tennessee and consists of a south-central portion of Rutherford County. The district includes large parts of the cities of Murfreesboro, Rockvale, Christiana, and Eagleville. Incumbent Republican Tim Rudd has represented the district since 2017.

District 34 Republican primary
Party	Candidate	Votes	%
Republican	Tim Rudd (incumbent)	4,476	100.00
Total votes		4,476	100.00

District 34 Democratic primary
Party	Candidate	Votes	%
Democratic	Owen Farnsworth	2,997	100.00
Total votes		2,997	100.00

=== District 35 ===
District 35 election
Nominee	William Slater	Phil Barnes
Party	Republican	Democratic
Incumbent Representative
William Slater
Republican

The 35th district is located in Middle Tennessee and consists of all of Trousdale County and a southeastern portion of Sumner County. The district includes all of the cities of Castalian Springs and Hartsville, roughly half of Gallatin, and small parts of Hendersonville and Bethpage. Incumbent Republican William Slater has represented the district since 2023.

District 35 Republican primary
Party	Candidate	Votes	%
Republican	William Slater (incumbent)	6,306	100.00
Total votes		6,306	100.00

District 35 Democratic primary
Party	Candidate	Votes	%
Democratic	Phil Barnes	1,481	67.75
Democratic	Lance Loftis	705	32.25
Total votes		2,186	100.00

=== District 36 ===
District 36 election
Nominee	Noah Smith
Party	Republican
Incumbent Representative
Dennis Powers
Republican

The 36th district is located in East Tennessee and consists of all of Union and Campbell counties, and the western half of Claiborne County. The district includes the cities of Maynardville, New Tazewell, La Follette, Jellico, Jacksboro, and Caryville. Incumbent Republican Dennis Powers has represented the district since 2011. He was challenged in the Republican primary by Noah Smith, an airline pilot.

District 36 Republican primary
Party	Candidate	Votes	%
Republican	Noah Smith	8,034	66.97
Republican	Dennis Powers (incumbent)	3,963	33.03
Total votes		11,997	100.00

=== District 37 ===
District 37 election
Nominee	Charlie Baum	Mary Ann Young
Party	Republican	Democratic
Incumbent Representative
Charlie Baum
Republican

The 37th district is located in Middle Tennessee and consists of a north-central strip of Rutherford County and includes portions of the cities of Murfreesboro, Smyrna, and Walterhill. Incumbent Republican Charlie Baum has represented the district since 2019.

District 37 Republican primary
Party	Candidate	Votes	%
Republican	Charlie Baum (incumbent)	4,498	100.00
Total votes		4,498	100.00

District 37 Democratic primary
Party	Candidate	Votes	%
Democratic	Mary Ann Young	1,521	59.65
Democratic	Marlayna Trego	1,029	40.35
Total votes		2,550	100.00

=== District 38 ===
District 38 election
Nominee	Kelly Keisling	Seth McMillan
Party	Republican	Democratic
Incumbent Representative
Kelly Keisling
Republican

The 38th district is located between East and Middle Tennessee and consists of a strip of counties stretching along the Kentucky-Tennessee border, including all of Scott, Pickett, Clay, and Macon counties, and the northern half of Fentress County. The district includes the cities of Oneida, Lafayette, Red Boiling Springs, Huntsville, and part of Jamestown. Incumbent Republican Kelly Keisling has represented the district since 2011.

District 38 Republican primary
Party	Candidate	Votes	%
Republican	Kelly Keisling (incumbent)	12,364	100.00
Total votes		12,364	100.00

District 38 Democratic primary
Party	Candidate	Votes	%
Democratic	Seth McMillan	1,081	100.00
Total votes		1,081	100.00

=== District 39 ===
District 39 election
Nominee	Iris Rudder
Party	Republican
Incumbent Representative
Iris Rudder
Republican

The 39th district is located between East and Middle Tennessee and consists of two counties on the Georgia-Tennessee border: Marion County and Franklin County. The district includes the cities of Winchester, Jasper, South Pittsburg, and Sewanee. The district is also home to The University of the South. Incumbent Republican Iris Rudder has represented the district since 2019.

District 39 Republican primary
Party	Candidate	Votes	%
Republican	Iris Rudder (incumbent)	9,232	100.00
Total votes		9,232	100.00

=== District 40 ===
District 40 election
Nominee	Michael Hale	Daniel Hawthorne
Party	Republican	Democratic
Incumbent Representative
Michael Hale
Republican

The 40th district is located in Middle Tennessee and consists of all of Jackson, Smith, DeKalb, and Cannon counties, and a very small portion of northeastern Wilson County. The district includes the cities of Smithville, Carthage, and Woodbury. Incumbent Republican Michael Hale has represented the district since 2023.

District 40 Republican primary
Party	Candidate	Votes	%
Republican	Michael Hale (incumbent)	10,634	100.00
Total votes		10,634	100.00

District 40 Democratic primary
Party	Candidate	Votes	%
Democratic	Daniel Hawthorne	1,528	100.00
Total votes		1,528	100.00

=== District 41 ===
District 41 election
Nominee	Ed Butler	R. Jason Goodman
Party	Republican	Democratic
Incumbent Representative
Ed Butler
Republican

The 41st district is located between East and Middle Tennessee and consists of all of Morgan and Overton counties, the southern half of Fentress County, a northern strip of Anderson County, and a very small piece of northern Roane County. The district includes the cities of Livingston, Coalfield, Norris, Petros, and parts of the cities of Oliver Springs and Clinton. Incumbent Republican Ed Butler has represented the district since 2023.

District 41 Republican primary
Party	Candidate	Votes	%
Republican	Ed Butler (incumbent)	9,638	100.00
Total votes		9,638	100.00

District 41 Democratic primary
Party	Candidate	Votes	%
Democratic	R. Jason Goodman	1,443	100.00
Total votes		1,443	100.00

=== District 42 ===
District 42 election
Nominee	Ryan Williams	Trenton Strode
Party	Republican	Democratic
Incumbent Representative
Ryan Williams
Republican

The 42nd district is located in Middle Tennessee and consists of the western half of Putnam County. The district includes the cities of Cookeville, Algood, and Baxter. Incumbent Republican Ryan Williams has represented the district since 2011.

District 42 Republican primary
Party	Candidate	Votes	%
Republican	Ryan Williams (incumbent)	9,542	100.00
Total votes		9,542	100.00

District 42 Democratic primary
Party	Candidate	Votes	%
Democratic	Trenton Strode	3,098	100.00
Total votes		3,098	100.00

=== District 43 ===
District 43 election
Nominee	Paul Sherrell	Samantha Petit
Party	Republican	Democratic
Incumbent Representative
Paul Sherrell
Republican

The 43rd district is located in Middle Tennessee and consists of all of White and Warren counties. The district includes the cities of McMinnville and Sparta. Incumbent Republican Paul Sherrell has represented the district since 2017.

District 43 Republican primary
Party	Candidate	Votes	%
Republican	Paul Sherrell (incumbent)	7,415	64.20
Republican	DeWayne Howard	4,135	35.80
Total votes		11,550	100.00

District 43 Democratic primary
Party	Candidate	Votes	%
Democratic	Samantha Petit	1,828	100.00
Total votes		1,828	100.00

=== District 44 ===
District 44 election
Nominee	William Lamberth	Latoya Holcomb
Party	Republican	Democratic
Incumbent Representative
William Lamberth
Republican

The 44th district is located in Middle Tennessee and consists of most of Sumner County. The district includes the cities of Portland, White House, Westmoreland, and part of the cities of Hendersonville and Gallatin. Incumbent Republican William Lamberth has represented the district since 2013.

District 44 Republican primary
Party	Candidate	Votes	%
Republican	William Lamberth (incumbent)	5,250	78.56
Republican	Jennifer J. Barton	1,433	21.44
Total votes		6,683	100.00

District 44 Democratic primary
Party	Candidate	Votes	%
Democratic	Latoya Holcomb	1,927	100.00
Total votes		1,927	100.00

=== District 45 ===
District 45 election
Nominee	Brian Stewart	Mandy Cook
Party	Republican	Democratic
Incumbent Representative
Johnny Garrett
Republican

The 45th district is located in Middle Tennessee and consists of a southwestern portion of Sumner County. The district includes all of the city of Shackle Island, most of Millersville, the western half of Hendersonville, and the Sumner County portion of Goodlettsville. Incumbent Republican Johnny Garrett has represented the district since 2019. Garrett is retiring from the seat to run for Tennessee's 6th congressional district, from which the incumbent John Rose is retiring to run for Governor.

District 45 Republican primary
Party	Candidate	Votes	%
Republican	Brian Stewart	3,295	48.66
Republican	Chris Hughes	1,789	26.42
Republican	John Gentry	1,688	24.92
Total votes		6,772	100.00

District 45 Democratic primary
Party	Candidate	Votes	%
Democratic	Mandy Cook	2,455	100.00
Total votes		2,455	100.00

=== District 46 ===
District 46 election
Nominee	Clark Boyd	Dominic Howard
Party	Republican	Democratic
Incumbent Representative
Clark Boyd
Republican

The 46th district is located in Middle Tennessee and consists of a large portion of Wilson County. The district includes most of the city of Lebanon, all of Watertown, and a small part of Gladeville. Incumbent Republican Clark Boyd has represented the district since 2018.

District 46 Republican primary
Party	Candidate	Votes	%
Republican	Clark Boyd (incumbent)	9,673	100.00
Total votes		9,673	100.00

District 46 Democratic primary
Party	Candidate	Votes	%
Democratic	Dominic Howard	3,025	100.00
Total votes		3,025	100.00

=== District 47 ===
District 47 election
Nominee	Rush Bricken	Mike Stein
Party	Republican	Democratic
Incumbent Representative
Rush Bricken
Republican

The 47th district is located in Middle Tennessee and consists of all of Grundy County and Coffee County. The district includes the cities of Manchester, Gruetli-Laager, New Union, and the Coffee County portion of Tullahoma. Incumbent Republican Rush Bricken has represented the district since 2019.

District 47 Republican primary
Party	Candidate	Votes	%
Republican	Rush Bricken (incumbent)	7,728	100.00
Total votes		7,728	100.00

District 47 Democratic primary
Party	Candidate	Votes	%
Democratic	Mike Stein	1,664	100.00
Total votes		1,664	100.00

=== District 48 ===
District 48 election
Nominee	Bryan Terry	Matt Ferry
Party	Republican	Democratic
Incumbent Representative
Bryan Terry
Republican

The 48th district is located in Middle Tennessee and consists of the eastern half of Rutherford County. The district includes a small part of the city of Murfreesboro and about half of Walterhill and Christiana. Incumbent Republican Bryan Terry has represented the district since 2015.

District 48 Republican primary
Party	Candidate	Votes	%
Republican	Bryan Terry (incumbent)	5,873	100.00
Total votes		5,873	100.00

District 48 Democratic primary
Party	Candidate	Votes	%
Democratic	Matt Ferry	2,781	100.00
Total votes		2,781	100.00

=== District 49 ===
District 49 election
Nominee	Mike Sparks	Connie Casha
Party	Republican	Democratic
Incumbent Representative
Mike Sparks
Republican

The 49th district is located in Middle Tennessee and consists of a northwestern portion of Rutherford County. The district includes most of the city of Smyrna, about half of La Vergne, and a small part of Murfreesboro. Incumbent Republican Mike Sparks has represented the district since 2011.

District 49 Republican primary
Party	Candidate	Votes	%
Republican	Mike Sparks (incumbent)	3,152	100.00
Total votes		3,152	100.00

District 49 Democratic primary
Party	Candidate	Votes	%
Democratic	Connie Casha	2,817	100.00
Total votes		2,817	100.00

=== District 50 ===
District 50 election
Nominee	Bo Mitchell
Party	Democratic
Incumbent Representative
Bo Mitchell
Democratic

The 50th district is located in Middle Tennessee and consists of a northwestern portion of Davidson County, and is the largest district in the county. The district includes a northwestern portion of the city of Nashville, most of the Davidson County portion of Goodlettsville, and all of the Davidson County portion of Ridgetop. Incumbent Democrat Bo Mitchell has represented the district since 2013. In 2024, Kamala Harris won the district with a margin of 4.4%.

District 50 Democratic primary
Party	Candidate	Votes	%
Democratic	Bo Mitchell (incumbent)	5,003	100.00
Total votes		5,003	100.00

=== District 51 ===
District 51 election
Nominee	Aftyn Behn
Party	Democratic
Incumbent Representative
Aftyn Behn
Democratic

The 51st district is located in Middle Tennessee and consists of a section of Nashville in central Davidson County. The district includes parts of Downtown Nashville, East Nashville, and South Nashville. Incumbent Democrat Aftyn Behn has represented the district since 2023.

District 51 Democratic primary
Party	Candidate	Votes	%
Democratic	Aftyn Behn (incumbent)	7,674	100.00
Total votes		7,674	100.00

=== District 52 ===
District 52 election
Nominee	Justin Jones	Michele Vetter
Party	Democratic	Republican
Incumbent Representative
Justin Jones
Democratic

The 52nd district is located in Middle Tennessee and consists of a section of Nashville in eastern Davidson County. The district includes Antioch and parts of East Nashville. Incumbent Democrat Justin Jones has represented the district since in 2023.

District 52 Democratic primary
Party	Candidate	Votes	%
Democratic	Justin Jones (incumbent)	4,420	100.00
Total votes		4,420	100.00

District 52 Republican primary
Party	Candidate	Votes	%
Republican	Michele Vetter	1,029	100.00
Total votes		1,029	100.00

=== District 53 ===
District 53 election
Nominee	Jason Powell
Party	Democratic
Incumbent Representative
Jason Powell
Democratic

The 53rd district is located in Middle Tennessee and consists of a section of Nashville in southeastern Davidson County. Incumbent Democrat Jason Powell has represented the district since 2013.

District 53 Democratic primary
Party	Candidate	Votes	%
Democratic	Jason Powell (incumbent)	4,059	100.00
Total votes		4,059	100.00

=== District 54 ===
District 54 election
Nominee	Vincent B. Dixie
Party	Democratic
Incumbent Representative
Vincent B. Dixie
Democratic

The 54th district is located in Middle Tennessee and consists of a section of Nashville in northwestern Davidson County. Incumbent Democrat Vincent B. Dixie has represented the district since 2019.

District 54 Democratic primary
Party	Candidate	Votes	%
Democratic	Vincent B. Dixie (incumbent)	8,313	100.00
Total votes		8,313	100.00

=== District 55 ===
District 55 election
Nominee	John Ray Clemmons	Jayla Thomas
Party	Democratic	Republican
Incumbent Representative
John Ray Clemmons
Democratic

The 55th district is located in Middle Tennessee and consists of a section of Nashville in southeastern Davidson County. Incumbent Democrat John Ray Clemmons has represented the district since 2015.

District 55 Democratic primary
Party	Candidate	Votes	%
Democratic	John Ray Clemmons (incumbent)	3,515	100.00
Total votes		3,515	100.00

District 55 Republican primary
Party	Candidate	Votes	%
Republican	Jayla Thomas	563	100.00
Total votes		563	100.00

=== District 56 ===
District 56 election
Nominee	Bob Freeman
Party	Democratic
Incumbent Representative
Bob Freeman
Democratic

The 56th district is located in Middle Tennessee and consists of a section of Nashville in southwestern Davidson County. Incumbent Democrat Bob Freeman has represented the district since 2019.

District 56 Democratic primary
Party	Candidate	Votes	%
Democratic	Bob Freeman (incumbent)	6,182	100.00
Total votes		6,182	100.00

=== District 57 ===
District 57 election
Nominee	Susan Lynn	Matt Burchfield
Party	Republican	Democratic
Incumbent Representative
Susan Lynn
Republican

The 57th district is located in Middle Tennessee and consists of a western portion of Wilson County, including Mount Juliet. Incumbent Republican Susan Lynn has represented the district since 2013.

District 57 Republican primary
Party	Candidate	Votes	%
Republican	Susan Lynn (incumbent)	8,611	100.00
Total votes		8,611	100.00

District 57 Democratic primary
Party	Candidate	Votes	%
Democratic	Matt Burchfield	3,262	74.82
Democratic	Heath Scott	1,098	25.18
Total votes		4,360	100.00

=== District 58 ===
District 58 election
Nominee	Harold M. Love Jr.
Party	Democratic
Incumbent Representative
Harold M. Love Jr.
Democratic

The 58th district is located in Middle Tennessee and consists of a section of Nashville in central Davidson County. Incumbent Democrat Harold M. Love Jr. has represented the district since 2013.

District 58 Democratic primary
Party	Candidate	Votes	%
Democratic	Harold M. Love Jr. (incumbent)	5,027	100.00
Total votes		5,027	100.00

=== District 59 ===
District 59 election
Nominee	Mark Proctor	Bill Hancock
Party	Democratic	Republican
Incumbent Representative
Caleb Hemmer
Democratic

The 59th district is located in Middle Tennessee and covers parts of southern Davidson County, including neighborhoods such as Belle Meade, Forest Hills, Oak Hill, and Bellevue, in Nashville. Incumbent Democrat Caleb Hemmer had represented the district since 2023. Hemmer announced that he will not seek re-election. The district is considered competitive. Bill Lee narrowly carried it in the 2022 gubernatorial election and in the 2024 presidential election, Kamala Harris won the district with a margin of 2.5%.

District 59 Democratic primary
Party	Candidate	Votes	%
Democratic	Mark Proctor	2,475	31.89
Democratic	Angie Lawless	2,397	30.88
Democratic	Beth West	1,755	22.61
Democratic	Rick Ewing	1,135	14.62
Total votes		7,762	100.00

District 59 Republican primary
Party	Candidate	Votes	%
Republican	Bill Hancock	5,513	100.00
Total votes		5,513	100.00

=== District 60 ===
District 60 election
Nominee	Shaundelle Brooks	Eva Romero
Party	Democratic	Republican
Incumbent Representative
Shaundelle Brooks
Democratic

The 60th district is located in eastern Davidson County and includes the suburbs of Donelson, Hermitage, Lakewood, and Old Hickory. Incumbent Democrat Shaundelle Brooks has represented the district since 2025. The district leans Democratic but remains somewhat competitive. In 2024, Kamala Harris won the district with a margin of 10.5%.

District 60 Democratic primary
Party	Candidate	Votes	%
Democratic	Shaundelle Brooks (incumbent)	5,469	100.00
Total votes		5,469	100.00

District 60 Republican primary
Party	Candidate	Votes	%
Republican	Eva Romero	3,328	100.00
Total votes		3,328	100.00

=== District 61 ===
District 61 election
Nominee	Gino Bulso	Becca Ripley
Party	Republican	Democratic
Incumbent Representative
Gino Bulso
Republican

The 61st district is located in Middle Tennessee and includes the northern part of Williamson County, particularly part of Brentwood and Franklin. Incumbent Republican Gino Bulso has represented the district since 2023.

District 61 Republican primary
Party	Candidate	Votes	%
Republican	Gino Bulso (incumbent)	7,557	100.00
Total votes		7,557	100.00

District 61 Democratic primary
Party	Candidate	Votes	%
Democratic	Becca Ripley	3,605	100.00
Total votes		3,605	100.00

=== District 62 ===
District 62 election
Nominee	Pat Marsh	Brieanna Akers
Party	Republican	Democratic
Incumbent Representative
Pat Marsh
Republican

The 62nd district is located in Middle Tennessee and includes Bedford, Moore, and parts of Lincoln counties. Incumbent Republican Pat Marsh has represented the district since 2009.

District 62 Republican primary
Party	Candidate	Votes	%
Republican	Pat Marsh (incumbent)	11,116	100.00
Total votes		11,116	100.00

District 62 Democratic primary
Party	Candidate	Votes	%
Democratic	Brieanna Akers	1,926	100.00
Total votes		1,926	100.00

=== District 63 ===
District 63 election
Nominee	Jake McCalmon	Laura Andreson
Party	Republican	Democratic
Incumbent Representative
Jake McCalmon
Republican

The 63rd district is located in Middle Tennessee, covering the eastern part of Williamson County, including Nolensville and parts of Brentwood and Franklin. Incumbent Republican Jake McCalmon has represented the district since 2022.

District 63 Republican primary
Party	Candidate	Votes	%
Republican	Jake McCalmon (incumbent)	7,231	100.00
Total votes		7,231	100.00

District 63 Democratic primary
Party	Candidate	Votes	%
Democratic	Laura Andreson	3,565	100.00
Total votes		3,565	100.00

=== District 64 ===
District 64 election
Nominee	Scott Cepicky	Craig D'Apolito
Party	Republican	Democratic
Incumbent Representative
Scott Cepicky
Republican

The 64th district is located in Middle Tennessee and includes the eastern half of Maury County, including most of the city of Columbia. Incumbent Republican Scott Cepicky has represented the district since 2019.

District 64 Republican primary
Party	Candidate	Votes	%
Republican	Scott Cepicky (incumbent)	7,539	100.00
Total votes		7,539	100.00

District 64 Democratic primary
Party	Candidate	Votes	%
Democratic	Craig D'Apolito	2,740	100.00
Total votes		2,740	100.00

=== District 65 ===
District 65 election
Nominee	Lee Reeves	Julian Pierre-Griffin
Party	Republican	Democratic
Incumbent Representative
Lee Reeves
Republican

The 65th district is located in Middle Tennessee and includes the western part of Williamson County, including Fairview and parts of Franklin and Thompson's Station. Incumbent Republican Lee Reeves has represented the district since 2025.

District 65 Republican primary
Party	Candidate	Votes	%
Republican	Lee Reeves (incumbent)	5,523	54.48
Republican	Michelle Foreman	4,615	45.52
Total votes		10,138	100.00

District 65 Democratic primary
Party	Candidate	Votes	%
Democratic	Julian Pierre-Griffin	3,500	100.00
Total votes		3,500	100.00

=== District 66 ===
District 66 election
Nominee	Sabi "Doc" Kumar	Tamara Bavendam
Party	Republican	Democratic
Incumbent Representative
Sabi "Doc" Kumar
Republican

The 66th district is located in Middle Tennessee, covering all of Robertson County which includes Springfield. Incumbent Republican Sabi "Doc" Kumar has represented the district since 2015. He is the first Indian American to be elected to the Tennessee State House, and chairs the House Insurance Committee and serves on several others.

District 66 Republican primary
Party	Candidate	Votes	%
Republican	Sabi "Doc" Kumar (incumbent)	6,186	100.00
Total votes		6,186	100.00

District 66 Democratic primary
Party	Candidate	Votes	%
Democratic	Tamara Bavendam	1,724	100.00
Total votes		1,724	100.00

=== District 67 ===
District 67 election
Nominee	Ronnie Glynn	Chris Lanier
Party	Democratic	Republican
Incumbent Representative
Ronnie Glynn
Democratic

The 67th district is located in Middle Tennessee and is located in the urban core of Clarksville in Montgomery County. The district includes the Austin Peay State University campus. Incumbent Democrat Ronnie Glynn has represented the district since 2023. In 2024, he narrowly won re-election by just a 0.6% margin. Donald Trump won the district with a margin of 1.8%. This is considered a highly competitive district.

District 67 Democratic primary
Party	Candidate	Votes	%
Democratic	Ronnie Glynn (incumbent)	3,351	100.00
Total votes		3,351	100.00

District 67 Republican primary
Party	Candidate	Votes	%
Republican	Chris Lanier	2,511	100.00
Total votes		2,511	100.00

=== District 68 ===
District 68 election
Nominee	Aron Maberry	Garfield Scott
Party	Republican	Democratic
Incumbent Representative
Aron Maberry
Republican

The 68th district is located in Middle Tennessee and consists of a section of Clarksville in eastern Montgomery County. Incumbent Republican Aron Maberry has represented the district since 2025.

District 68 Republican primary
Party	Candidate	Votes	%
Republican	Aron Maberry (incumbent)	7,184	100.00
Total votes		7,184	100.00

District 68 Democratic primary
Party	Candidate	Votes	%
Democratic	Garfield Scott	3,248	100.00
Total votes		3,248	100.00

=== District 69 ===
District 69 election
Nominee	Jody Barrett	Rachael Murray
Party	Republican	Democratic
Incumbent Representative
Jody Barrett
Republican

The 69th district is located in Middle Tennessee and includes all of Hickman and Lewis counties, as well as the western part of Dickson County. Incumbent Republican Jody Barrett has represented the district since 2023.

District 69 Republican primary
Party	Candidate	Votes	%
Republican	Jody Barrett (incumbent)	7,845	100.00
Total votes		7,845	100.00

District 69 Democratic primary
Party	Candidate	Votes	%
Democratic	Rachael Murray	1,202	67.76
Democratic	Van Harris	572	32.24
Total votes		1,774	100.00

=== District 70 ===
District 70 election
Nominee	Clay Doggett	Rayanne Moos
Party	Republican	Democratic
Incumbent Representative
Clay Doggett
Republican

The 70th district is located in Middle Tennessee and includes all of Giles County, as well as parts of Lawrence and Lincoln counties. Incumbent Republican Clay Doggett has represented the district since 2019.

District 70 Republican primary
Party	Candidate	Votes	%
Republican	Clay Doggett (incumbent)	10,657	100.00
Total votes		10,657	100.00

District 70 Democratic primary
Party	Candidate	Votes	%
Democratic	Rayanne Moos	1,798	100.00
Total votes		1,798	100.00

=== District 71 ===
District 71 election
Nominee	Kip Capley	Matt Day
Party	Republican	Democratic
Incumbent Representative
Kip Capley
Republican

The 71st district is located in southern Middle Tennessee and includes all of Wayne, and parts the western part of Maury County as well as parts of Hardin and Lawrence counties. Incumbent Republican Kip Capley has represented the district since 2023.

District 71 Republican primary
Party	Candidate	Votes	%
Republican	Kip Capley (incumbent)	8,227	100.00
Total votes		8,227	100.00

District 71 Democratic primary
Party	Candidate	Votes	%
Democratic	Matt Day	1,565	100.00
Total votes		1,565	100.00

=== District 72 ===
District 72 election
Nominee	Kirk Haston
Party	Republican
Incumbent Representative
Kirk Haston
Republican

The 72nd district is located mainly in West Tennessee and includes all of Chester, Decatur, and Perry County, as well as parts of Hardin and Henderson counties. Incumbent Republican Kirk Haston has represented the district since 2019.

District 72 Republican primary
Party	Candidate	Votes	%
Republican	Kirk Haston (incumbent)	8,565	100.00
Total votes		8,565	100.00

=== District 73 ===
District 73 election
Nominee	Chris Todd
Party	Republican
Incumbent Representative
Chris Todd
Republican

The 73rd district is located in West Tennessee and includes a part of Madison County and parts of Jackson. Incumbent Republican Chris Todd has represented the district since 2019.

District 73 Republican primary
Party	Candidate	Votes	%
Republican	Chris Todd (incumbent)	6,951	100.00
Total votes		6,951	100.00

=== District 74 ===
District 74 election
Nominee	Jay Reedy
Party	Republican
Incumbent Representative
Jay Reedy
Republican

The 74th district is located in Middle and West Tennessee and includes Benton, Houston, Humphreys, Stewart, and part of Henry County. Incumbent Republican Jay Reedy has represented the district since 2015.

District 74 Republican primary
Party	Candidate	Votes	%
Republican	Jay Reedy (incumbent)	10,455	100.00
Total votes		10,455	100.00

=== District 75 ===
District 75 election
Nominee	Michael Lankford	Allie Phillips
Party	Republican	Democratic
Incumbent Representative
Michael Lankford
Republican

The 75th district is located in Middle Tennessee and consists of a section of Clarksville in western Montgomery County. Republican Jeff Burkhart represented the district from 2023 until his death on November 14, 2025. Following Burkhart's death, the Montgomery County Commission appointed Republican Michael Lankford to represent the district. A Clarksville resident and Montgomery County commissioner, Lankford was selected on December 8, 2025, after a 9–9 tie vote with Democratic nominee Allie Phillips (who was also the Democratic nominee in 2024), which was broken by County Mayor Wes Golden. Lankford will serve the remainder of Burkhart's term. In 2024, Donald Trump won the district with a margin of 12.6%.

District 75 Republican primary
Party	Candidate	Votes	%
Republican	Michael Lankford (incumbent)	2,729	100.00
Total votes		2,729	100.00

District 75 Democratic primary
Party	Candidate	Votes	%
Democratic	Allie Phillips	2,438	100.00
Total votes		2,438	100.00

=== District 76 ===
District 76 election
Nominee	Tandy Darby
Party	Republican
Incumbent Representative
Tandy Darby
Republican

The 76th district is located in West Tennessee and includes all of Weakley and part of Carroll and Henry counties. Incumbent Republican Tandy Darby has represented the district since 2021.

District 76 Republican primary
Party	Candidate	Votes	%
Republican	Tandy Darby (incumbent)	7,569	100.00
Total votes		7,569	100.00

=== District 77 ===
District 77 election
Nominee	Rusty Grills	Erin Reid
Party	Republican	Independent
Incumbent Representative
Rusty Grills
Republican

The 77th district is located in West Tennessee and includes Dyer, Lake, and parts of Obion County. Incumbent Republican Rusty Grills has represented the district since 2020.

District 77 Republican primary
Party	Candidate	Votes	%
Republican	Rusty Grills (incumbent)	6,901	100.00
Total votes		6,901	100.00

=== District 78 ===
District 78 election
Nominee	Perry Keenan	Hillary Capes-Gwinn
Party	Republican	Democratic
Incumbent Representative
Mary Littleton
Republican

The 78th district is located in Middle Tennessee and consists of Cheatham County and the eastern half of Dickson County. The district includes the cities of Ashland City, Pleasant View, and part of Dickson. Incumbent Republican Mary Littleton had represented the district since 2013. Littleton announced that she would not seek re-election.

District 78 Republican primary
Party	Candidate	Votes	%
Republican	Perry Keenan	4,492	55.91
Republican	John Louallen	3,543	44.09
Total votes		8,035	100.00

District 78 Democratic primary
Party	Candidate	Votes	%
Democratic	Hillary Capes-Gwinn	1,208	50.29
Democratic	Aniya Farmer	1,194	49.71
Total votes		2,402	100.00

=== District 79 ===
District 79 election
Nominee	Brock Martin	Kirk Carter
Party	Republican	Independent
Incumbent Representative
Brock Martin
Republican

The 79th district is located in West Tennessee and includes parts of Carroll, Gibson, and Henderson counties. Incumbent Republican Brock Martin has represented the district since 2023.

District 79 Republican primary
Party	Candidate	Votes	%
Republican	Brock Martin (incumbent)	7,532	100.00
Total votes		7,532	100.00

=== District 80 ===
District 80 election
Nominee	Andrea Bond Johnson	Julian McTizic
Party	Democratic	Republican
Incumbent Representative
Johnny Shaw
Democratic

The 80th district is located in West Tennessee and consists of most of Hardeman County and parts of Haywood and Madison counties. The district includes the cities of Bolivar, Brownsville, and a part of Jackson. Incumbent Democrat Johnny Shaw had represented the district since 2001. Shaw announced that he will not seek re-election. In 2024, Kamala Harris won the district with a margin of 7.3%.

District 80 Democratic primary
Party	Candidate	Votes	%
Democratic	Andrea Bond Johnson	3,054	49.75
Democratic	Bethany Miller	2,178	35.48
Democratic	Shelia Godwin	907	14.77
Total votes		6,139	100.00

District 80 Republican primary
Party	Candidate	Votes	%
Republican	Julian McTizic	3,088	100.00
Total votes		3,088	100.00

=== District 81 ===
District 81 election
Nominee	Brett Giannini
Party	Republican
Incumbent Representative
Debra Moody
Democratic

The 81st district is located in West Tennessee and includes Tipton and part of Haywood County. Incumbent Republican Debra Moody has represented the district since 2013. Moody is not appearing on the ballot for this election.

District 81 Republican primary
Party	Candidate	Votes	%
Republican	Brett Giannini	4,387	57.23
Republican	Jason Fleming	3,278	42.77
Total votes		7,665	100.00

=== District 82 ===
District 82 election
Nominee	Chris Hurt
Party	Republican
Incumbent Representative
Chris Hurt
Republican

The 82nd district is located in West Tennessee and includes all of Crockett and Lauderdale County as well as parts of Gibson and Obion County. Incumbent Republican Chris Hurt has represented the district since 2019.

District 82 Republican primary
Party	Candidate	Votes	%
Republican	Chris Hurt (incumbent)	6,998	100.00
Total votes		6,998	100.00

=== District 83 ===
District 83 election
Nominee	Mark White	Margaret Price
Party	Republican	Democratic
Incumbent Representative
Mark White
Republican

The 83rd district is located in West Tennessee and consists of some Memphis suburbs in southeastern Shelby County. The district includes the city of Germantown and part of the neighborhood White Station. Incumbent Republican Mark White has represented the district since 2010. In 2024, Donald Trump won the district with a margin of 8.0%.

District 83 Republican primary
Party	Candidate	Votes	%
Republican	Mark White (incumbent)	6,597	100.00
Total votes		6,597	100.00

District 83 Democratic primary
Party	Candidate	Votes	%
Democratic	Margaret Price	4,795	100.00
Total votes		4,795	100.00

=== District 84 ===
District 84 election
Nominee	Joe Towns
Party	Democratic
Incumbent Representative
Joe Towns
Democratic

The 84th district is located in West Tennessee and includes parts of the city of Memphis in southern Shelby County. Incumbent Democrat Joe Towns has represented the district since 1995.

District 84 Democratic primary
Party	Candidate	Votes	%
Democratic	Joe Towns (incumbent)	4,086	72.89
Democratic	Kyler Gilkey	1,520	27.11
Total votes		5,606	100.00

=== District 85 ===
District 85 election
Nominee	Jesse Chism
Party	Democratic
Incumbent Representative
Jesse Chism
Democratic

The 85th district is located in West Tennessee and includes parts of the city of Memphis in southern Shelby County. Incumbent Democrat Jesse Chism has represented the district since 2019.

District 85 Democratic primary
Party	Candidate	Votes	%
Democratic	Jesse Chism (incumbent)	10,602	100.00
Total votes		10,602	100.00

=== District 86 ===
District 86 election
Nominee	Justin J. Pearson
Party	Democratic
Incumbent Representative
Justin J. Pearson
Democratic

The 86th district is located in West Tennessee and includes parts of the city of Memphis, primarily in western Shelby County. It covers areas such as Downtown, South Memphis, Benjestown, and Northaven. Incumbent Democrat Justin J. Pearson had represented the district since 2023. Pearson announced that he would run for Tennessee's 9th congressional district. At the same time, he is on the ballot for re-election.

District 86 Democratic primary
Party	Candidate	Votes	%
Democratic	Justin J. Pearson (incumbent)	6,475	92.24
Democratic	David Page	545	7.76
Total votes		7,020	100.00

=== District 87 ===
District 87 election
Nominee	Karen Camper	Reggie Hall
Party	Democratic	Republican
Incumbent Representative
Karen Camper
Democratic

The 87th district is located in West Tennessee in Memphis, covering part of Shelby County, and includes Whitehaven. Incumbent Democrat Karen Camper has represented the district since winning a special election in March 2008. She serves as House Minority Leader and chairs key committees.

District 87 Democratic primary
Party	Candidate	Votes	%
Democratic	Karen Camper (incumbent)	5,541	100.00
Total votes		5,541	100.00

District 87 Republican primary
Party	Candidate	Votes	%
Republican	Reggie Hall	502	100.00
Total votes		502	100.00

=== District 88 ===
District 88 election
Nominee	Larry Miller
Party	Democratic
Incumbent Representative
Larry Miller
Democratic

The 88th district is located in West Tennessee and includes parts of central Shelby County. Incumbent Democrat Larry Miller has represented the district since 1995.

District 88 Democratic primary
Party	Candidate	Votes	%
Democratic	Larry Miller (incumbent)	5,868	100.00
Total votes		5,868	100.00

=== District 89 ===
District 89 election
Nominee	Justin Lafferty	Randy Debord
Party	Republican	Democratic
Incumbent Representative
Justin Lafferty
Republican

The 89th district is located in East Tennessee and includes parts of western Knox County, including Karns. Incumbent Republican Justin Lafferty has represented the district since 2019.

District 89 Republican primary
Party	Candidate	Votes	%
Republican	Justin Lafferty (incumbent)	7,530	100.00
Total votes		7,530	100.00

District 89 Democratic primary
Party	Candidate	Votes	%
Democratic	Randy Debord	3,842	100.00
Total votes		3,842	100.00

=== District 90 ===
District 90 election
Nominee	Gloria Johnson
Party	Democratic
Incumbent Representative
Gloria Johnson
Democratic

The 90th district is located in East Tennessee and consists of several neighborhoods in the city of Knoxville, which is in Knox County. It includes West Knoxville and most of North Knoxville. Incumbent Democrat Gloria Johnson has represented the district since 2019.

District 90 Democratic primary
Party	Candidate	Votes	%
Democratic	Gloria Johnson (incumbent)	5,770	100.00
Total votes		5,770	100.00

=== District 91 ===
District 91 election
Nominee	Torrey Harris
Party	Democratic
Incumbent Representative
Torrey Harris
Democratic

The 91st district is located in West Tennessee and includes parts of the city of Memphis in southwestern Shelby County. Incumbent Democrat Torrey Harris has represented the district since 2021.

District 91 Democratic primary
Party	Candidate	Votes	%
Democratic	Torrey Harris (incumbent)	5,504	71.55
Democratic	Arriell Gipson-Martin	2,189	28.45
Total votes		7,693	100.00

=== District 92 ===
District 92 election
Nominee	Todd Warner	Teri Mai
Party	Republican	Democratic
Incumbent Representative
Todd Warner
Republican

The 92nd district is located in Middle Tennessee and covers all of Marshall County, parts of Franklin County, Marion County, and Lincoln County. Incumbent Republican Todd Warner has represented the district since 2021.

District 92 Republican primary
Party	Candidate	Votes	%
Republican	Todd Warner (incumbent)	4,430	52.17
Republican	Vincent Cuevas	4,062	47.83
Total votes		8,492	100.00

District 92 Democratic primary
Party	Candidate	Votes	%
Democratic	Teri Mai	2,751	100.00
Total votes		2,751	100.00

=== District 93 ===
District 93 election
Incumbent Representative
T. J. Hardaway
Democratic

The 93rd district is located in West Tennessee and includes parts of the city of Memphis in central Shelby County. Incumbent Democrat T. J. Hardaway was appointed by the Shelby County Board of Commissioners in 2026 to replace his father G. A. Hardaway, who died in April. Prior to his death, G. A. Hardaway failed to qualify for the ballot due to a signature on his petition being deemed invalid, leaving the 93rd district without any qualified candidates. On June 18, T. J. Hardaway announced a write-in bid for the seat. Hardaway later dropped his bid, leaving five write-in candidates running in the general election.

District 93 general election
Party	Candidate	Votes	%
Write-in	John Bradley		
Write-in	Brandon "DD" Washington		
Write-in	Mitchell Morrison		
Write-in	Tommy Brewington		
Write-in	Calvin Lacy		
Total votes			

=== District 94 ===
District 94 election
Nominee	Ron Gant	Francine Johnson
Party	Republican	Democratic
Incumbent Representative
Ron Gant
Republican

The 94th district is located in West Tennessee and includes all of Fayette and McNairy County and the southern part of Hardeman County. Incumbent Republican Ron Gant has represented the district since 2017.

District 94 Republican primary
Party	Candidate	Votes	%
Republican	Ron Gant (incumbent)	8,760	100.00
Total votes		8,760	100.00

District 94 Democratic primary
Party	Candidate	Votes	%
Democratic	Francine Johnson	2,726	100.00
Total votes		2,726	100.00

=== District 95 ===
District 95 election
Nominee	Kevin Vaughan
Party	Republican
Incumbent Representative
Kevin Vaughan
Republican

The 95th district is located in West Tennessee and includes part of Shelby County, particularly areas in the eastern suburbs of Memphis such as most of Collierville, some of Germantown, Lakeland, and Bartlett. Incumbent Republican Kevin Vaughan has represented the district since 2017.

District 95 Republican primary
Party	Candidate	Votes	%
Republican	Kevin Vaughan (incumbent)	7,795	100.00
Total votes		7,795	100.00

=== District 96 ===
District 96 election
Nominee	Telisa Franklin
Party	Democratic
Incumbent Representative
Gabby Salinas
Democratic

The 96th district is located in West Tennessee and includes a portion of central Shelby County, including parts of Memphis. Incumbent Democrat Gabby Salinas has represented the district since 2025.

District 96 Democratic primary
Party	Candidate	Votes	%
Democratic	Telisa Franklin	4,593	55.22
Democratic	Gabby Salinas (incumbent)	3,725	44.78
Total votes		8,318	100.00

=== District 97 ===
District 97 election
Nominee	John Gillespie	Jesse Huseth
Party	Republican	Democratic
Incumbent Representative
John Gillespie
Republican

The 97th district is located in West Tennessee and consists of some neighborhoods in the city of Memphis, which is in Shelby County. It includes East Memphis, Chickasaw Gardens, and part of the neighborhood White Station. The district also includes the park Shelby Farms. Incumbent Republican John Gillespie has represented the district since 2021. This is a highly competitive district. In 2024, Gillespie won re-election by 3.4%, and Kamala Harris won the district with a margin of 4.9%.

District 97 Republican primary
Party	Candidate	Votes	%
Republican	John Gillespie (incumbent)	5,924	100.00
Total votes		5,924	100.00

District 97 Democratic primary
Party	Candidate	Votes	%
Democratic	Jesse Huseth	5,896	100.00
Total votes		5,896	100.00

=== District 98 ===
District 98 election
Nominee	Antonio Parkinson
Party	Democratic
Incumbent Representative
Antonio Parkinson
Democratic

The 98th district is located in West Tennessee and includes a portion of central Shelby County, including parts of Memphis. Incumbent Democrat Antonio Parkinson has represented the district since 2011.

District 98 Democratic primary
Party	Candidate	Votes	%
Democratic	Antonio Parkinson (incumbent)	6,250	100.00
Total votes		6,250	100.00

=== District 99 ===
District 99 election
Nominee	Tom Leatherwood	William Mouzon
Party	Republican	Independent
Incumbent Representative
Tom Leatherwood
Republican

The 99th district is located in suburban Shelby County including parts of Bartlett and Millington as well as Lakeland and Arlington. Republican Tom Leatherwood has represented the district since 2020.

District 99 Republican primary
Party	Candidate	Votes	%
Republican	Tom Leatherwood (incumbent)	5,609	65.67
Republican	Amber Mills	2,932	34.33
Total votes		8,541	100.00

== See also ==
- 2026 Tennessee elections
- 2026 Tennessee Senate election
