= Andrea Bond Johnson =

American politician

Member of the Tennessee House of Representatives from the 80th district
- Incumbent
- Assumed office January 12, 2027
- Preceded by: Johnny Shaw

Personal details
- Party: Democratic
- Education: Tennessee State University; University of Tennessee
- Website: House website

Andrea Bond Johnson is an American politician who is the Democratic member-elect to the 80th district of the Tennessee House of Representatives.

== Education and career ==
Andrea Bond Johnson received her bachelor's degree from Tennessee State University before earning an MBA from the University of Tennessee. She owns a small insurance company and is a licensed mortician.

== Tennessee House of Representatives ==
In 2018 and 2020, Bond Johnson received the Democratic nomination to represent the 82nd district of the Tennessee House of Representatives. She lost both elections to Republican nominee Chris Hurt.

In 2025, Bond Johnson announced her third campaign for the 2026 state house elections. This time, she ran for the 80th district, the only Democratic seat in rural Tennessee. Despite facing opponents in the Democratic primary, Bond Johnson prevailed, winning the Democratic nomination. She later received the endorsement of the district's longtime representative Johnny Shaw. In the general election, Bond Johnson defeated Bolivar mayor Julian McTizic to win the election to the seat.

== Personal life ==
Bond Johnson lives in Brownsville, Tennessee.
