= Matthew Szalaj =

American politician

Member-elect of the Tennessee House of Representatives from the 84th district
- Assuming office January 12, 2027
- Succeeding: Joe Towns

Personal details
- Party: Democratic
- Website: House website

Matthew Szalaj is an American politician who is the Democratic member-elect for the 84th district of the Tennessee House of Representatives.

== Early career ==
Szalaj was formerly the special assistant for policy under Memphis mayor Paul Young.

In March 2026, Szalaj was appointed as an interim member of the Shelby County Commission, filling a vacancy created after previous commissioner Edmund Ford pleaded guilty to five counts of federal tax evasion.

== Tennessee House of Representatives ==
In August 2026, Joe Towns, the Democratic member for the 84th district of the Tennessee House of Representatives, won the Democratic nomination in his re-election bid. However, weeks later, Towns resigned from office to become Shelby County Criminal Court clerk. Because the resignation occurred after Towns won the primary, the 84th district was left without a nominee for the upcoming general election. Picking a replacement nominee became the responsibility of the Shelby County Democratic Party's executive committee.

According to the executive committee's rules, only members who live in the district without a nominee can vote to appoint a replacement. Under these rules, committee member Coleman Thompson became the only eligible voter, as he was the only member to live in the 84th district. Thompson selected Szalaj as the replacement nominee. Because no other candidates filed to run for the seat, Szalaj won the general election unopposed.
