= Jordan Henderson (politician) =

American politician

Member-elect of the Tennessee House of Representatives from the 8th district
- Assuming office January 12, 2027
- Succeeding: Jerome Moon

Personal details
- Born: Maryville, Tennessee
- Party: Republican
- Website: Campaign website

Jordan Henderson is an American politician. A member of the Republican Party, he is the member-elect of the Tennessee House of Representatives for the 8th district. He was elected at the 2026 election.
