= Bryan Goldberg (politician) =

American politician (born 1983)

Member-elect of the Tennessee House of Representatives from the 18th district
- Assuming office January 12, 2027
- Succeeding: Elaine Davis

Personal details
- Born: June 16, 1983 (age 43)
- Party: Democratic
- Children: 2
- Education: University of Tennessee (BS)
- Website: House website

Bryan Goldberg (born June 16, 1983) is an American politician who is the Democratic member-elect to the 18th district of the Tennessee House of Representatives.

== Early life and education ==
Bryan Goldberg was born on June 16, 1983. He attended the University of Tennessee, where he was a competitive swimmer. In 2007, he graduated cum laude with a BS in business administration.

== Tennessee House of Representatives ==
In 2024, Goldberg challenged incumbent Republican representative Elaine Davis for her seat in the 18th district of the Tennessee House of Representatives. Davis defeated Goldberg by about 2,600 votes.

In 2026, Goldberg challenged Davis in a second attempt at the seat. This time, he successfully ousted Davis, winning the election with roughly 55 percent of the district's vote.

== Personal life ==
Goldberg is married and has two children. He is Jewish. He has cited Bill Clinton and Howard Baker as leaders he would like to emulate.
