= Telisa Franklin =

American politician

Member-elect of the Tennessee House of Representatives from the 96th district
- Assuming office January 12, 2027
- Succeeding: Gabby Salinas

Personal details
- Born: Memphis, Tennessee, U.S.
- Party: Democratic
- Website: House website

Telisa Franklin is an American politician and entrepreneur who is the Democratic member-elect to the 96th district of the Tennessee House of Representatives.

== Early life and career ==
Telisa Franklin was born in Memphis, Tennessee, and grew up in the Douglass community.

She is a business owner and motivational speaker. She is the president of the Memphis Juneteenth Festival and a multicultural relations coordinator for the Mid-South Transplant Foundation.

== Tennessee House of Representatives ==
In 2024, Franklin ran for the 96th district of the Tennessee House of Representatives, seeking to replace retiring representative Dwayne Thompson. The Democratic primary included five candidates, including Franklin and Gabby Salinas, the recipient of Thompson's endorsement. In the primary, Franklin received the second-most votes, but lost the nomination to Salinas.

In 2026, Franklin again sought nomination to the seat, creating a two-way race in the primary between herself and Salinas. This time, Franklin defeated Salinas with 55 percent of the primary vote. She later won the general election uncontested.

== Personal life ==
Franklin lives in Memphis.
