= Noah Smith (politician) =

American politician (born 1999)

Member-elect of the Tennessee House of Representatives from the 36th district
- Assuming office January 12, 2027
- Succeeding: Dennis Powers

Personal details
- Born: October 25, 1999 (age 27)
- Party: Republican
- Education: University of Tennessee (BS)
- Occupation: Politician; pilot
- Website: House website

Noah Smith (born October 25, 1999) is an American politician who is the Republican member-elect to the 36th district of the Tennessee House of Representatives.

== Early life and education ==
Noah Smith was born on October 25, 1999. He graduated from Campbell County High School. He later attended the University of Tennessee. During his time in college, he was elected to the Campbell County School Board, and he worked as a legislative intern for Bill Hagerty. In 2022, he graduated with a BS in supply chain management, marketing, and political science. He later completed training to become a commercial pilot with Endeavor Air.

== Tennessee House of Representatives ==
In 2026, Smith announced his campaign to represent the 36th district in the Tennessee House of Representatives. In doing so, he challenged eight-term incumbent Dennis Powers, a fellow Republican endorsed by Bill Lee. Smith, who campaigned with a heavy emphasis on term limits, defeated Powers in the primary with over two-thirds of the vote. He faced no opponent in the general election.

== Personal life ==
Smith is a Baptist.
