= Joe McCord =

American politician

Member of the Tennessee House of Representatives from the 8th district
- In office January 12, 1999 – January 11, 2011
- Preceded by: Bill Clabough
- Succeeded by: Art Swann

Personal details
- Born: Knoxville, Tennessee, U.S.
- Party: Republican
- Children: 2
- Education: University of Tennessee (BA)
- Website: House website

Joe McCord, born in Knoxville, Tennessee, is a Tennessee politician and formerly served in the Tennessee House of Representatives representing the 8th district, which is a part of Blount County and Sevier County.

He was first elected to the 101st General Assembly and served as a member of the Republican Party. He was vice chair of the Wildlife Subcommittee and a member of the Commerce Committee, the Conservation and Environment Committee, the Ethics Committee, the Environment Subcommittee, and the Industrial Impact Subcommittee. During the 103rd General Assembly, he was a member of the Utilities and Banking Subcommittee. He also served as the Minority Caucus Vice-Chairman. In 2011, at the beginning of the 107th General Assembly, Speaker Beth Harwell appointed him Chief Clerk of the House of Representatives. He was reappointed to this post for the 108th General Assembly, which began in January 2013. He graduated from Maryville High School, received a B.A. from the University of Tennessee in 1991, and worked as a businessman.

Preceded by Burney Durham	Chief Clerk of the House of Representatives; 2011-present	Succeeded by incumbent
