= Elaine Davis (politician) =

American politician (born 1983)

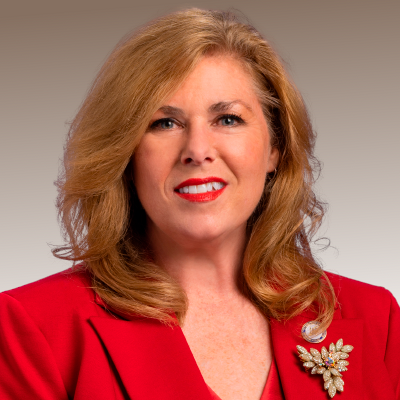

Member of the Tennessee House of Representatives from the 18th district
- Incumbent
- Assumed office January 10, 2023
- Preceded by: Eddie Mannis

Personal details
- Born: June 16, 1983 (age 43)
- Party: Republican
- Other political affiliations: Democratic (2006)
- Spouse: Married
- Children: 3
- Education: University of Tennessee (BA)
- Website: House website Campaign website

Elaine Davis (born June 16, 1983) is an American politician. She is a Republican, and represents parts of western and southern Knox County in the 18th district of the Tennessee House of Representatives. She assumed office on January 10, 2023.

== Early life and education ==
Davis was born on June 16, 1983, and attended Farragut High School. She graduated from the University of Tennessee with a bachelor's degree.

== Political career ==
=== 2006 Knox County Commission Election ===
In 2006, Davis ran for Seat B of the 4th District for the Knox County Commission. She ran as a Democrat in the Primary. She lost the general election to Phil B. Guthe.

Knox County Commission 4th District, Seat B General Election
Party	Candidate	Votes	%
Republican	Phil B. Guthe	3,214	55.3%
Democratic	Elaine Davis	2,591	44.6%
Republican	Harry Sherrod	3	0.05%
Total votes		5,808	100.0

=== 2020 Tennessee House Election ===
In 2020, Davis ran for the Tennessee House of Representatives in the 13th district. She won the Republican Primary unopposed. She lost to Democratic incumbent Gloria Johnson.

2020 Republican primary: Tennessee House of Representatives, District 13
Party	Candidate	Votes	%
Republican	Elaine Davis	4,066	100.00%
Total votes		4,066	100.0

2020 general election: Tennessee House of Representatives, District 13
Party	Candidate	Votes	%
Democratic	Gloria Johnson (incumbent)	14,242	52.93
Republican	Elaine Davis	12,664	47.07
Total votes		26,906	100.0

=== 2022 Tennessee House Election ===
After redistricting, Davis was in the 18th House District. The 18th District consists of the Suburbs around I-75 and West Knoxville, including the communities of Amherst, Ceder Bluff, Rocky Hill, Bearden, Sequoyah Hills, Lakemoor Hills, Topside, Mount Olive, and Bonny Kate. She won the Republican primary, and defeated Democrat Greg B. Kaplan.

2022 Republican primary: Tennessee House of Representatives, District 18
Party	Candidate	Votes	%
Republican	Elaine Davis	3,529	55.9%
Republican	Janet Testerman	2,785	44.1%
Total votes		6,314	100.0

2022 General Election: Tennessee House of Representatives: District 18
Party	Candidate	Votes	%
Republican	Elaine Davis	11,604	54.1%
Democratic	Gregory B. Kaplan	9,846	45.9%
Total votes		21,450	100.0

=== Tenure ===
Davis assumed office on January 10, 2023. She voted in favor of expelling three Democratic members of the State House after violating decorum rules, including Gloria Johnson.
