= John Bradley (Tennessee politician) =

American politician

Member-elect of the Tennessee House of Representatives from the 93rd district
- Assuming office January 12, 2027
- Succeeding: T. J. Hardaway

Personal details
- Party: Democratic
- Website: Campaign website

John Bradley is an American politician. A member of the Democratic Party, he is the member-elect for the Tennessee House of Representatives for the 93rd district. He was elected at the 2026 election in a write-in campaign.
