= Owen Farnsworth =

American politician

Member-elect of the Tennessee House of Representatives from the 34th district
- Assuming office January 14, 2027
- Succeeding: Tim Rudd

Personal details
- Born: 2001 or 2002 (age 24–25)
- Party: Democratic
- Other political affiliations: Democratic Socialists of America

Owen Farnsworth (born 2001 or 2002) is an American politician. A Democrat, he is the member-elect for the Tennessee House of Representatives from the 34th district.

== Biography ==
Farnsworth grew up in Fisher, Illinois and moved to Murfreesboro, Tennessee when he was 14. He attended Middle Tennessee State University, intending to receive a degree in political science, but ultimately dropped out due to not being able to afford tuition.

In 2026, Farnsworth defeated incumbent Tim Rudd in the 2026 Tennessee House of Representatives election, becoming the first Democrat to represent district 34 since Thomas C. Wheeler in 1990. He will be sworn in alongside the rest of the 115th Tennessee General Assembly on January 14, 2027.
