= Brett Windrow =

American politician

Member-elect of the Tennessee House of Representatives from the 13th district
- Assuming office January 12, 2027
- Succeeding: Robert Stevens

Personal details
- Party: Democratic
- Website: Campaign website

Brett Windrow is an American politician. A member of the Democratic Party, he is the member-elect for the Tennessee House of Representatives for the 13th district. He was elected at the 2026 election. Windrow is an attorney.
