= Kelly Keisling =

American politician (born 1951)

Member of the Tennessee House of Representatives from the 38th district
- Incumbent
- Assumed office January 11, 2011
- Preceded by: Leslie Winningham

Personal details
- Born: March 16, 1951 (age 75) Albany, Kentucky, U.S.
- Party: Republican
- Spouse: Janet
- Children: 3
- Education: Belmont University
- Website: House website Campaign website

Kelly T. Keisling (born March 16, 1951) is an American politician and a Republican member of the Tennessee House of Representatives representing the 38th district since January 2011.

In 2023, Keisling supported a resolution to expel three Democratic lawmakers from the legislature for violating decorum rules. The expulsion was widely characterized as unprecedented.

== Education ==
Keisling attended Belmont University.

== Career ==
During the COVID-19 pandemic, Keisling opposed vaccine requirements.

In 2012, Keisling sent a mass email through his state email account, drawing national attention, which claimed President Barack Obama was planning a fake assassination attempt as a pretext for imposing martial law to keep the 2012 election from happening.

=== Elections ===
- 2012 Keisling was unopposed for the August 2, 2012 Republican Primary, winning with 4,575 votes, and won the November 6, 2012 General election with 14,190 votes (71.8%) against Democratic nominee David Harper.
- 2010 To challenge District 38 incumbent Democratic Representative Leslie Winningham, Keisling was unopposed for the August 5, 2010 Republican Primary, winning with 5,537 votes, and won the November 2, 2010 General election with 7,965 votes (56.5%) against Representative Winningham.
