= Jason Powell =

American politician (born 1978)

Jason L. Powell
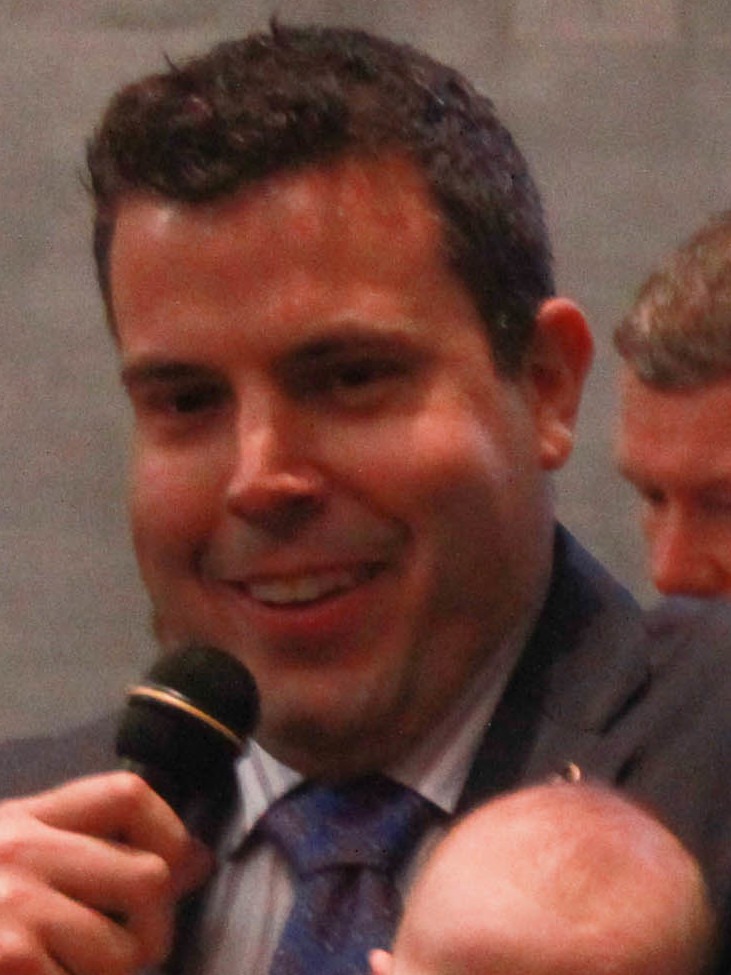

Member of the Tennessee House of Representatives from the 53rd district
- Incumbent
- Assumed office January 8, 2013
- Preceded by: Janis Baird Sontany

Personal details
- Born: January 25, 1978 (age 48) Nashville, Tennessee, U.S.
- Party: Democratic
- Spouse: Heather Corum
- Education: Montgomery Bell Academy; University of Colorado Boulder; University of Memphis; Tennessee State University

Jason Powell (born January 25, 1978) is an American politician. As a Democrat, he has represented the 53rd district in the Tennessee House of Representatives since 2013.

== Early life ==
Powell was born on January 25, 1978, in Nashville, Tennessee. He married Heather Corum, a nonprofit executive. The couple have two children named Sophie and Hawkes.

== Education ==
Powell attended Montgomery Bell Academy for high school. Powell also attended the University of Colorado Boulder and University of Memphis, he went in as a representative of the nation's largest college student government. He received a Master of Public Administration from Tennessee State University. Powell used to teach in public schools; he taught in schools in his district as well.

Powell has worked in real estate and nonprofit management.

== Religion ==
He attended Saint Matthias Church and he was also baptized there.

Powell considers himself Episcopal. The Episcopal Church is a member church of the worldwide Anglican Communion and is based in the United States with additional dioceses elsewhere. It is a mainline Christian denomination divided into nine provinces

== Organization ==
- He was a Former Board Number at, the Prevention Alliance of Tennessee.
- Licensed Real Estate Broker, State of Tennessee
- House Member of The 106th and 109th General Assembly
- Member, House Business and Utilities Committee

== Memberships ==
- Member, Caldwell-Abbay Hall Neighborhood Association
- Member, Cane Ridge Community Club
- Member, Crieve Hall Neighborhood Association
- Former Member, Education Report Card Committee, Nashville Area Chamber of Commerce
- Member, Fairlane Park Neighborhood Association
- Member, Glencliff Neighborhood Association
- Member, Greater Nashville Apartment Association
- Member, Greater Nashville Realtors
- Former Board Member, Nashville Emerging Leaders
- Former Board Member, Prevention Alliance of Tennessee
- Member, South Area Advisory Council, Nashville Area Chamber of Commerce
- Member, Tennessee Association of Realtors
- Member, Woodbine Neighborhood Association
