= Connie Casha =

American politician

Member-elect of the Tennessee House of Representatives from the 49th district
- Assuming office January 12, 2027
- Succeeding: Mike Sparks

Personal details
- Party: Democratic
- Spouse: Joey Casha
- Website: House website

Connie Casha is an American politician and educator who is the Democratic member-elect to the 49th district of the Tennessee House of Representatives.

== Early career ==
Before entering politics, Casha was director of early learning programs and adjunct professor at Middle Tennessee State University in Murfreesboro.

== Tennessee House of Representatives ==
In 2026, Casha declared her candidacy against eight-term incumbent Mike Sparks, the Republican in Tennessee's 49th House district. She defeated Sparks in the general election, winning 55 percent of the district's votes.

== Personal life ==
Casha is married to her husband, Joey.
