= Jerome Moon =

American politician (born 1947)

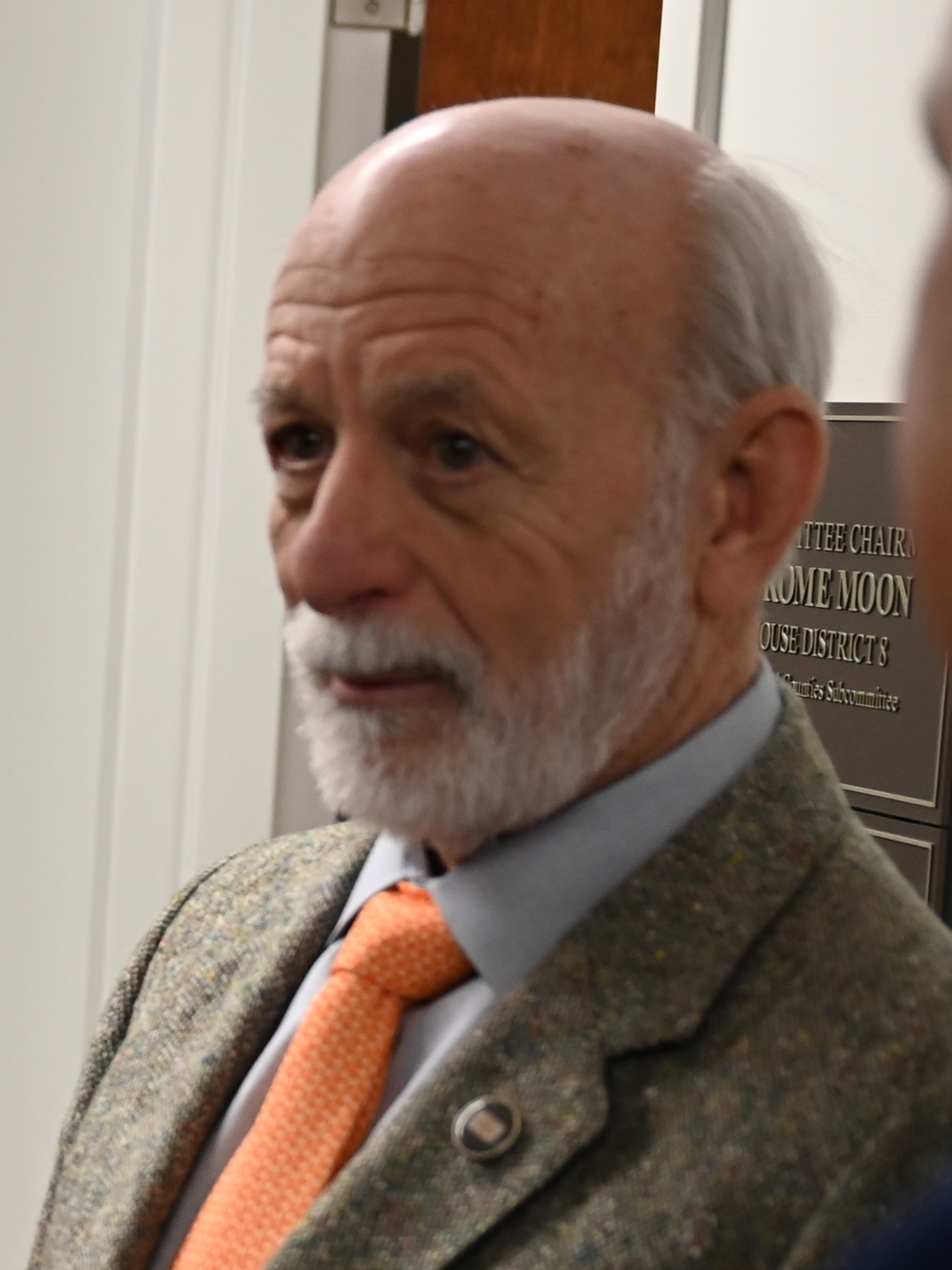
- Moon in 2025

Member of the Tennessee House of Representatives from the 8th district
- In office December 13, 2017 – November 3, 2026
- Preceded by: Art Swann
- Succeeded by: Jordan Henderson

Personal details
- Born: June 20, 1947 (age 79) Maryville, Tennessee, U.S.
- Party: Republican
- Spouse: Deborah
- Children: 2
- Education: University of Tennessee
- Website: House website

Jerome Moon (born June 20, 1947) is an American politician. A Republican, he represents District 8, encompassing parts of Blount County, in the Tennessee House of Representatives. Moon, the former chair of the Blount County Commission, was appointed the State House seat vacated by Art Swann on December 13, 2017.

== Career ==
In 2023, the Tennessee House voted on motions to remove three sitting Democratic representatives — Gloria Johnson, Justin Jones, and Justin J. Pearson — for disrupting proceedings with a protest as demonstrators were at the capitol voicing their outrage over a mass shooting at a Nashville school that left six dead. Moon voted in favor of all three resolutions: HR 63, to remove Pearson; HR 64, to remove Johnson; and HR 65, to remove Jones. Pearson and Jones were expelled, while Johnson was not.
