= Benjestown, Tennessee =

Unincorporated community in Tennessee, US

Coordinates: 35°15′06″N 90°03′19″W

Benjestown is an unincorporated community in Shelby County, Tennessee, United States, and is part of the Memphis metropolitan area.

== History ==
An old variant name is Benjes. A post office was established as Benjes in 1880, and remained in operation until it was discontinued in 1900. Benjestown was likely named for William Benjes, a German American industrialist.
