= Tennessee House of Representatives 93rd district =

State legislative district in Tennessee

Tennessee's 93rd State House of Representatives district
- Map of Tennessee House districts with the 93rd District shaded in red
Representative
T. J. Hardaway; D–Memphis
since 2026
- Demographics: 19.8% White; 57.7% Black; 19.2% Hispanic; 0.9% Asian; 1.3% Multiracial
- Population (2024): 70,956

The Tennessee House of Representatives 93rd district is one of the 99 legislative districts in the lower house of the Tennessee General Assembly. The district is located in West Tennessee and covers part of central Shelby County, curving around district 97. T. J. Hardaway has represented the district since 2026.

== Geography ==
The district includes parts of central Memphis around Midtown. It includes Binghampton and Orange Mound. Hollywood St forms a central axis, while Chelsea Avenue and Kimball Avenue are the northern and southern boundaries, respectively. It also includes a small unincorporated area in the northeast along Raleigh Lagrange Rd.

== Demographics ==
The Tennessee Comptroller estimates the population as of 2024 at 70,956. Poverty rates are nearly double the TN average of 13.8%, at 26.6%.

- 57.7% of the district is Black
- 19.8% of the district is White
- 19.2% of the district is Hispanic
- 0.9% of the district is Asian
- 1.3% of the district is Two or more races
- 1.1% of the district is some other race alone

Detailed demographic information is also available through Census Reporter.

== History ==
The 88th Tennessee General Assembly was the first in which all districts were numbered. The 93rd district has been part of Shelby County since it was created.

== List of Representatives ==
Representative	Party	Years of Service	General Assembly	Hometown
John Bradley	Democratic	November 3, 2026 - Present		
T. J. Hardaway	Democratic	May 7, 2026 - November 3, 2026	114th	Memphis
G. A. Hardaway	Democratic	2013 - April 24, 2026*	108th-114th	Memphis
Mike Kernell	Democratic	1975-2012	89th-107th	Memphis
R. Brad Martin	Republican	1973-1974	88th	Memphis

- G. A. Hardaway died in office. His son, T. J. Hardaway was appointed by the Shelby County Commission. He has chosen not to seek re-election.

No candidates qualified for the following election, which will be won by a write-in candidate. T. J. Hardaway endorsed Kyler Gillkey's write-in campaign.
