= Tennessee House of Representatives 18th district =

State legislative district in Tennessee

Tennessee's 18th State House of Representatives district
- Map of Tennessee House districts, with the 18th District shaded in red
Representative
Elaine Davis; R–Knoxville
- Demographics: 80% White; 5.5% Black; 7.5% Hispanic; 2.4% Asian; 0.6% Other; 3.9% Multiracial
- Population (2024): 72,525

The Tennessee House of Representatives 18th district is one of 99 legislative districts in the Tennessee House of Representatives. It represents south-central Knox County. The southeast is mostly unincorporated, while the west and north cuts into Knoxville. It includes the communities of Amherst, Ceder Bluff, Rocky Hill, Bearden, Sequoyah Hills, Lakemoor Hills, Topside, Mount Olive, and Bonny Kate. It has been represented by Republican Elaine Davis since 2023. The district is considered moderately competitive. In 2024, Donald Trump won the district by a margin of 9.5%.

== Demographics ==
According to the Tennessee Comptroller, District 4 had a population of approximately 72,525 as of 2024.

- 80% of the district is White
- 5.5% of the district is African American
- 7.5% of the district is Hispanic
- 2.4% of the district is Asian
- 0.6% of the district is some other race
- 3.9% of the district is two or more races

Detailed demographic information is also available via Census Reporter.

== History ==
The 88th Tennessee General Assembly was the first in which all districts were numbered. The 18th district has been part of Knox County since its creation.

== List of representatives ==
Representative	Party	Years of service	General Assembly	Residence
Elaine Davis	Republican	2023–present	113th–114th	Knoxville
Eddie Mannis	Republican	2021–2022	112th	Knoxville
Martin Daniel	Republican	2015–2020	109th–111th	Knoxville
Steve Hall	Republican	2011–2014	107th–108th	Knoxville
Stacey Campfield	Republican	2005–2010	104th–106th	Knoxville
Steven Buttry	Republican	1999–2004	101st–103rd	Knoxville
Tim Burchett	Republican	1995–1998	99th–100th	Knoxville
Maria Peroulas Draper	Republican	1985–1994	94th–98th	Knoxville
Bill Owen	Democratic	1981–1984	92nd–93rd	Knoxville
Jim Richards	Republican	1977–1980	90th–91st	Lenoir
Mike Rowland	Democratic	1975–1976	89th	Knoxville
Victor Ashe	Republican	1969–1974	86th-88th	Knoxville

== Electoral history ==
=== 2024 ===
2024 Tennessee House of Representatives election, District 18
Party	Candidate	Votes	%
Republican	Elaine Davis (incumbent)	18,611	53.75
Democratic	Brian Goldberg	16,013	46.25
Total votes		34,624	100.00

=== 2022 ===
2022 Tennessee House of Representatives election, District 18
Party	Candidate	Votes	%
Republican	Elaine Davis	11,604	54.10
Democratic	Gregory B. Kaplan	9,846	45.90
Total votes		21,450	100.00

=== 2020 ===
2020 Tennessee House of Representatives election, District 13
Party	Candidate	Votes	%
Republican	Eddie Mannis	17,400	54.80
Democratic	Virginia Couch	14,350	45.20
Total votes		31,750	100.00

=== 2018 ===
2018 Tennessee House of Representatives election, District 18
Party	Candidate	Votes	%
Republican	Martin Daniel (incumbent)	12,865	51.50
Democratic	Greg MacKay	12,118	48.50
Total votes		24,983	100.00

=== 2016 ===
2016 Tennessee House of Representatives election, District 18
Party	Candidate	Votes	%
Republican	Martin Daniel (incumbent)	15,572	59.18
Democratic	Brandi Price	10,742	40.82
Total votes		26,314	100.00
