= Robert Stevens (Tennessee politician) =

American politician and attorney

Member of the Tennessee House of Representatives from the 13th district
- In office January 10, 2023 – November 3, 2026
- Preceded by: Gloria Johnson (redistricting)
- Succeeded by: Brett Windrow

Personal details
- Born: May 23, 1985 (age 41)
- Party: Republican
- Education: Lipscomb University (BA); University of Memphis (JD)
- Website: House website

Robert Stevens (born May 23, 1985) is an American attorney and politician serving as a member of the Tennessee House of Representatives from the 13th district. A member of the Republican Party, he took office in January 2023. Before his election to the state legislature, Stevens served on the Rutherford County Commission from 2010 to 2022.

== Early life, education, and legal career ==
Stevens graduated from Middle Tennessee Christian School in 2003. He earned a bachelor's degree in political science from Lipscomb University in 2006 and a Juris Doctor from the University of Memphis in 2009. He works as an attorney in Smyrna, Tennessee.

== Political career ==
=== Rutherford County Commission ===
Stevens was elected to the Rutherford County Commission in 2010. He served three four-year terms before leaving the commission in August 2022.

=== Tennessee House of Representatives ===
Stevens ran for the Tennessee House of Representatives in 2022. In the general election, he defeated Democratic nominee Jeff Crum, receiving 8,672 votes to Crum's 5,311. Stevens was sworn into office on January 10, 2023.

On April 6, 2023, Stevens voted in favor of resolutions to expel Democratic representatives Justin Jones, Gloria Johnson, and Justin J. Pearson following their participation in a protest on the House floor calling for gun-control legislation after the 2023 Nashville school shooting. The House voted 72–25 to expel Jones and 69–26 to expel Pearson. The resolution to expel Johnson received a 65–30 vote, one vote short of the two-thirds majority required for expulsion.

Stevens was reelected in 2024, defeating Democratic nominee Jonathan Yancey with 16,210 votes to Yancey's 10,859.

During the 114th General Assembly, Stevens has served on the House Education, Private Acts, and Transportation committees and the Higher Education Subcommittee.
