= T. J. Hardaway =

American politician

Member of the Tennessee House of Representatives from the 93rd district
- In office May 7, 2026 – November 3, 2026
- Appointed by: Shelby County Commission
- Preceded by: G. A. Hardaway
- Succeeded by: John Bradley

Personal details
- Party: Democratic

Willis Lincoln Hardaway is an American politician who represented the 93rd district of the Tennessee House of Representatives in 2026. He was appointed by the Shelby County Commission to succeed his father, G. A. Hardaway, who served in the House from 2007 until his death in April 2026.
