= G. A. Hardaway =

American politician (1954–2026)

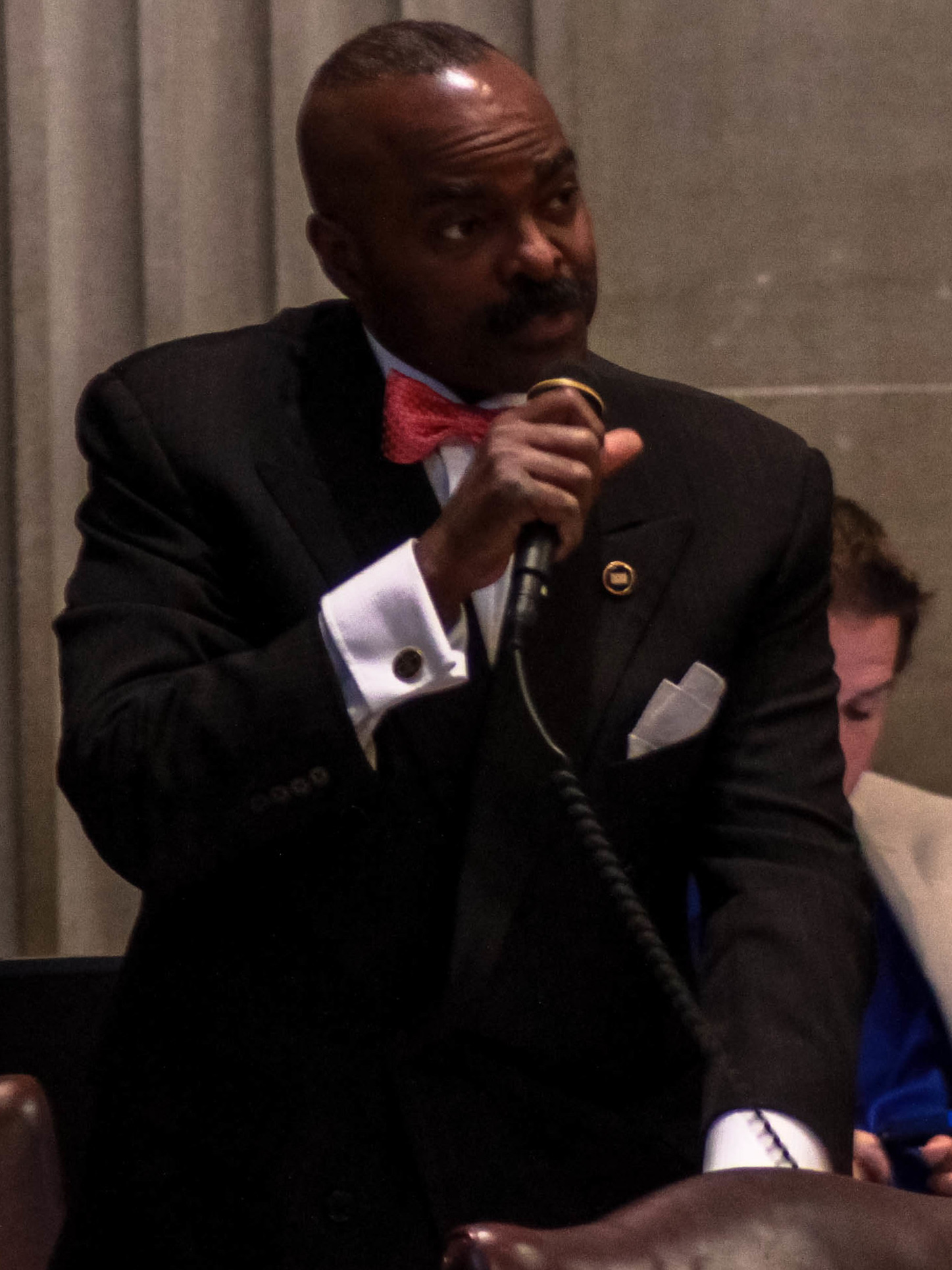
- Hardaway in 2014

Member of the Tennessee House of Representatives
- In office March 13, 2007 – April 24, 2026
- Preceded by: Henri Brooks
- Succeeded by: T. J. Hardaway
- Constituency: 92nd district (2007–2013); 93rd district (2013–2026)

Personal details
- Born: Goffrey A. Hardaway; June 18, 1954 Meridian, Mississippi, U.S.
- Died: April 24, 2026 (aged 71) Nashville, Tennessee, U.S.
- Party: Democratic
- Children: 3, including T.J.
- Education: DePaul University (BS)
- Website: House website

Goffrey A. Hardaway Sr. (June 18, 1954 – April 24, 2026) was an American politician who served as a Democratic member of the Tennessee House of Representatives. Elected in a 2007 special election, Hardaway represented Shelby County until his death in April 2026. Though originally elected to the 92nd district, he was later redistricted into the 93rd.

== Early life and education ==
Goffrey A. Hardaway was born in Meridian, Mississippi, on June 18, 1954. He held a BS in finance from DePaul University and worked as a real estate investor.

== Tennessee House of Representatives ==
In 2007, Democratic incumbent Henri Brooks resigned her 92nd district seat in the Tennessee House of Representatives, triggering a special election. Hardaway ran for the Democratic nomination to the seat, comprising parts of Shelby County, winning the primary unopposed. He then defeated Richard Morton in the general election.

In 2008, Hardaway defeated a challenger in the Democratic primary before winning his first full term in office unopposed in the general election. He would go on to win re-election again in 2010, 2012, 2014, 2016, 2018, 2020, 2022, and 2024. His closest subsequent election was the 2012 Democratic primary, in which Hardaway faced longtime representative Mike Kernell after being redistricted into the 93rd district. Hardaway defeated Kernell with just over 60 percent of the primary vote.

== Personal life and death ==
On the morning of April 24, 2026, Hardaway died, aged 71, at Vanderbilt University Medical Center in Nashville after a brief illness. His son T.J. Hardaway was appointed by the Shelby County Board of Commissioners to fill his seat in the legislature.

== Electoral history ==
Electoral history of G. A. Hardaway
Year	Office	District	Party	Primary			General			Result	Ref
Year	Office	District	Party	Total	%	P.	Total	%	P.	Result	Ref
2007	Tennessee House of Representatives	92	Democratic	623	100.0%	1st	1,405	58.1%	1st	Won	
2008	Tennessee House of Representatives	92	Democratic	4,032	73.3%	1st	14,819	100.0%	1st	Won	
2010	Tennessee House of Representatives	92	Democratic	5,579	100.0%	1st	8,254	100.0%	1st	Won	
2012	Tennessee House of Representatives	93	Democratic	2,927	61.0%	1st	16,126	100.0%	1st	Won	
2014	Tennessee House of Representatives	93	Democratic	5,069	100.0%	1st	6,996	73.6%	1st	Won	
2016	Tennessee House of Representatives	93	Democratic	2,945	100.0%	1st	13,832	83.8%	1st	Won	
2018	Tennessee House of Representatives	93	Democratic	4,816	83.4%	1st	12,323	100.0%	1st	Won	
2020	Tennessee House of Representatives	93	Democratic	4,723	100.0%	1st	13,900	99.9%	1st	Won	
2022	Tennessee House of Representatives	93	Democratic	5,150	100.0%	1st	7,359	100.0%	1st	Won	
2024	Tennessee House of Representatives	93	Democratic	2,209	75.2%	1st	12,398	80.9%	1st	Won	
