= Tennessee House of Representatives 96th district =

State legislative district in Tennessee

Tennessee's 96th State House of Representatives district
- Map of Tennessee House districts with the 96th District shaded in red
Representative
Gabby Salinas; D–Memphis
since 2025
- Demographics: 23.4% White; 58.7% Black; 9.3% Hispanic; 3.2% Asian; 4.6% Multiracial
- Population (2024): 70,542

The Tennessee House of Representatives 96th district is one of the 99 legislative districts in the lower house of the Tennessee General Assembly. The district is located in West Tennessee and covers part of central Shelby County. The district includes parts of North Memphis and Cordova. It includes areas northwest of the Memphis Zoo such as New Chelsea and Hollywood. It then stretches east, covering much of Cordova. Gabby Salinas has represented the district since 2025.

== Demographics ==
The Tennessee Comptroller estimates the population as of 2024 at 70,542.

- 58.7% of the district is Black
- 23.4% of the district is White
- 9.3% of the district is Hispanic
- 3.2% of the district is Asian
- 4.6% of the district is Two or more races

Detailed demographic information is also available through Census Reporter.

== History ==
The 88th Tennessee General Assembly was the first in which all districts were numbered. The 96th district has been part of Shelby County since it was created.

== List of Representatives ==
Representative	Party	Years of Service	General Assembly	Hometown
Gabby Salinas	Democratic	2025 - present	114th	Memphis
Dwayne Thompson	Democratic	2017-2024	110th-113th	Cordova
Steve McManus	Republican	2007-2016	105th-109th	Cordova
Paul Stanley	Republican	2001-2006	102nd-104th	Memphis
Joyce Hassell	Republican	1983-2000	93rd-101st	Memphis
Joe Kent	Republican	1979-1982	91st-92nd	Memphis
Edward F. Williams III	Republican	1971-1978	87th-90th	Memphis
