= Tennessee House of Representatives 13th district =

State legislative district in Tennessee

Tennessee's 13th State House of Representatives district
- Map of Tennessee House districts with the 13th District shaded in red
Representative
Robert Stevens; R–Smyrna
- Demographics: 61.2% White; 15.9% Black; 13.5% Hispanic; 5% Asian; 0.1% Native American; 0.5% Other; 3.7% Multiracial
- Population (2024): 76,919

The Tennessee House of Representatives 13th district is one of 99 legislative districts in the Tennessee House of Representatives. The district represents western Rutherford County. It includes the cities of La Vergne, portions of Smyrna, Eagleville, and much of Murfreesboro. It has been represented by former county commissioner Robert Stevens since 2023. The district is considered slightly competitive. In 2024, Donald Trump won the district by 18.3%

== History ==
Following redistricting on November 7, 2022, the district was moved from Knox County to Rutherford County.

== Demographics ==
The Tennessee Comptroller estimates the population as of 2024 at 76,919.

- 61.2% of the district is White
- 15.9% of the district is African American
- 13.5% of the district is Hispanic
- 5% of the district is Asian
- 0.5% of the district is some other race
- 3.7% of the district is Two or more races

Detailed demographic information is available through Census Reporter as well.

== List of representatives ==
Representative	Party	Years of service	General Assembly	Residence
Brett Windrow	Democratic	2026–present		
Robert Stevens	Republican	2023–2026	113th-114th	Smyrna
Gloria Johnson	Democratic	2019–2023 *Redistricted	111th-112th	Knoxville
Eddie Smith	Republican	2015–2018	109th-110th	Knoxville
Gloria Johnson	Democratic	2013–2014	108th	Knoxville
Harry Tindell	Democratic	1991–2012	97th-107th	Knoxville

== Under Current Lines ==
=== 2024 ===
2024 Tennessee House of Representatives election, District 13
Party	Candidate	Votes	%
Republican	Robert Stevens (incumbent)	16,210	59.88
Democratic	Jonathan Yancy	10,859	40.12
Total votes		27,069	100.00

=== 2022 ===
2022 Tennessee House of Representatives election, District 13
Party	Candidate	Votes	%
Republican	Robert Stevens	8,672	62.02
Democratic	Jeff Crum	5,311	37.98
Total votes		13,983	100.00
