= Gabby Salinas =

American politician

Member of the Tennessee House of Representatives from the 96th district
- Incumbent
- Assumed office January 14, 2025
- Preceded by: Dwayne Thompson

Personal details
- Born: Santa Cruz, Bolivia
- Party: Democratic
- Education: Christian Brothers University (BS); University of Kentucky College of Pharmacy (MS)
- Website: House website Campaign website

Gabriela Salinas is an American politician. She is a Democrat representing the 96th district in the Tennessee House of Representatives.

Salinas was born in Santa Cruz de la Sierra, Bolivia. After being diagnosed with Ewing sarcoma at age seven, she and her family relocated to Memphis, Tennessee to receive treatment at St. Jude Children's Research Hospital. Salinas graduated from Christian Brothers University in 2011.

Before her 2024 House campaign, Salinas had unsuccessfully run to become a member of the Tennessee General Assembly twice. In 2018, Salinas ran for the Tennessee Senate in the 31st district, where she was defeated by Republican incumbent Brian Kelsey in the general election. In 2020, she ran for the Tennessee House of Representatives in the 97th district, where she was defeated by Republican John Gillespie.

In 2024, Salinas ran again for the Tennessee House of Representatives, this time in the 96th district. She won the Democratic primary and was unopposed in the general election.
