= Joe Towns =

American politician

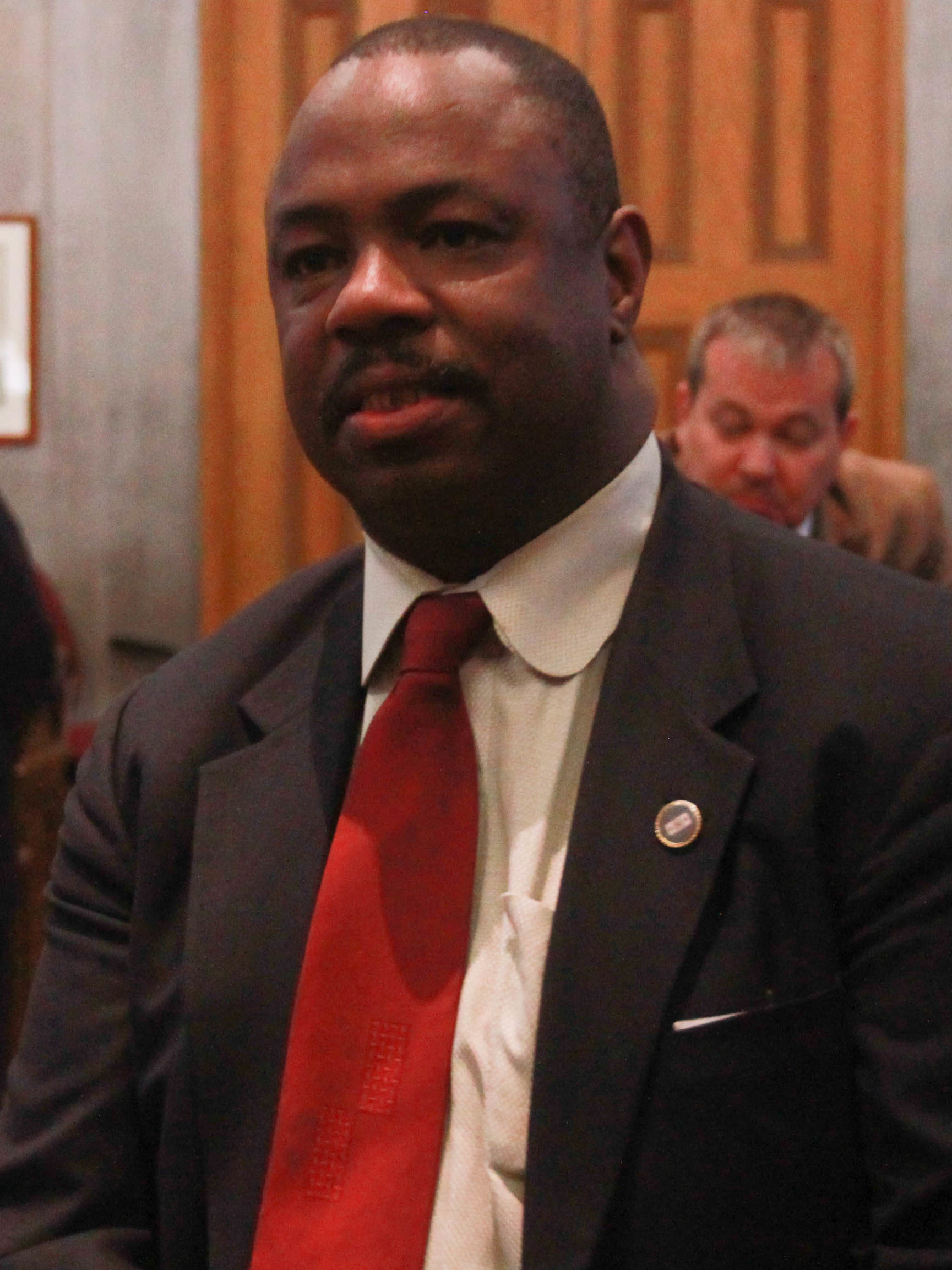
- Towns in 2014

Member of the Tennessee House of Representatives from the 84th district
- In office January 10, 1995 – August 31, 2026
- Preceded by: Bret Thompson
- Succeeded by: Vacant

Personal details
- Born: Memphis, Tennessee, U.S.
- Party: Democratic
- Education: LeMoyne–Owen College (BA); University of Arkansas (MS)
- Website: House website

Joe Towns Jr. is an American politician and a former Democratic member of the Tennessee House of Representatives representing the 84th district from 1995 to 2026. He resigned from the chamber after being elected as criminal court clerk of Shelby County.

== Early life and education ==
Joe Towns Jr. was born in Memphis, Tennessee. Towns earned his BA in political science from LeMoyne–Owen College and his MS from the University of Arkansas.

== Elections ==
- 2012 Towns was challenged in the August 2, 2012, Democratic primary, winning with 4,082 votes (81.6%), and was unopposed for the November 6, 2012, general election, winning with 19,389 votes.
- 1994 Towns was initially elected in the November 8, 1994, general election.
- 1996 Towns was challenged in the 1996 Democratic primary and was unopposed for the November 5, 1996, general election.
- 1998 Towns was challenged in the August 6, 1998, Democratic primary, winning with 3,621 votes (63.9%), and was unopposed for the November 3, 1998, general election, winning with 6,781 votes.
- 2000 Towns was challenged in the August 3, 2000, Democratic primary, winning with 2,430 votes (67.3%), and was unopposed for the November 7, 2000, general election, winning with 11,947 votes.
- 2002 Towns was unopposed for the August 1, 2002, Democratic primary, winning with 7,567 votes, and won the November 5, 2002, general election, winning with 9,930 votes (86.1%) against Independent candidate C. C. Buchanan.
- 2004 Towns was unopposed for both the August 5, 2004, Democratic primary, winning with 2,955 votes, and the November 2, 2004, general election, winning with 16,911 votes.
- 2006 Towns was challenged by his returning 1996 primary opponent in the August 3, 2006, Democratic primary, winning with 5,153 votes (73.2%), and was unopposed for the November 7, 2006, general election, winning with 13,155 votes.
- 2008 Towns was unopposed for both the August 7, 2008, Democratic primary, winning with 4,573 votes, and the November 4, 2008, general election, winning with 17,293 votes.
- 2010 Towns was challenged in the August 5, 2010, Democratic primary, winning with 6,381 votes (85.9%), and was unopposed for the November 2, 2010 General election with 10,596 votes.
