= Tennessee House of Representatives 80th district =

State legislative district in Tennessee

Tennessee's 80th State House of Representatives district
- Map of Tennessee House districts, with the 80th District shaded in red
Representative
Johnny Shaw; D–Bolivar
- Demographics: 36% White; 56% Black; 3% Hispanic; 0.4% Asian; 0.2% Native American; 0.2% Other; 3.6% Multiracial
- Population (2024): 65,980

The Tennessee House of Representatives 80th district is one of the 99 legislative districts in the lower house of the Tennessee General Assembly. The district covers parts of Hardeman, Haywood, and Madison counties. Cities in the district include Jackson, Brownsville, Bolivar, and Whiteville. The district has been represented by Johnny Shaw since 2001. The district is considered slightly competitive. In 2024, Kamala Harris won the district with a margin of 7.3%.

== Demographics ==
The Tennessee Comptroller estimates the population as of 2024 at 65,980. The district has a notably high poverty rate of 26.4%, while the median household income is nearly three-fifths of state medians.

- 56.4% of the district is African American
- 35.9% of the district is White
- 3.3% of the district is Hispanic
- 0.4% of the district is Asian
- 0.2% of the district is Native Americans
- 0.2% of the district is some other race alone
- 3.6% of the district is another race or 2 or more races.

== History ==
The 88th Tennessee General Assembly was the first in which all districts were numbered. At that time, the 80th district was made up of Fayette and Hardeman counties. During the 93rd GA, Chester, Hardin, and McNairy counties were included. From the 94th GA, it was made up of Hardeman, Chester, and Fayette counties. From the 102nd GA, it has been made up of parts of Hardeman, Haywood, and Madison counties.

== List of Representatives ==
Representative	Party	Years of Service	General Assembly	Residence
Johnny Shaw	Democratic	2001–present	102nd-114th	Bolivar
Page Walley	Republican	1991-2001	97th-101st	LaGrange
Robert Stallings	Democratic	1975-1991	89th-96th	Bolivar
Curtis Ross	Democratic	1969-1974	86th-88th<ref name ="Ross">"Representative Curtis Ross - TN General Assembly". wapp.capitol.tn.gov.</ref	Bolivar
