= Tennessee House of Representatives 84th district =

State legislative district in Tennessee

Tennessee's 84th State House of Representatives district
- Map of Tennessee House districts with the 84th District shaded in red
- Representative: Vacant
- Demographics: 5.6% White; 81% Black; 11.8% Hispanic; 0.2% Asian; 1% Multiracial
- Population (2024): 68,380

The Tennessee House of Representatives 84th district is one of the 99 legislative districts in the lower house of the Tennessee General Assembly. The district is located in West Tennessee and covers part of southern Shelby County. The seat is currently vacant. Joe Towns, who had represented the district since 1995, resigned August 31, 2026.

== Geography ==
The district includes parts of Southeast Memphis. It includes areas east of Memphis International Airport such as Hickory Hill and Capleville. The northern boundaries are Winchester Road and Bill Morris Parkway. The eastern boundary is Riverdale Road. The western boundary is Airways Boulevard. The southern boundary is East Holmes Road.

== Demographics ==
The Tennessee Comptroller estimates the population as of 2024 at 68,380. Poverty rates are 1.4x the Tennessee median of 13.8%, at 19.4%.

- 81% of the district is Black
- 5.6% of the district is White
- 11.8% of the district is Hispanic
- 0.2% of the district is Asian
- 1% of the district is Two or more races

Detailed demographic information is also available through Census Reporter.

== History ==
Prior to numbered districts, the district that would become the 84th was the 3rd district in Shelby County. The 88th Tennessee General Assembly was the first in which all districts were numbered. Since its creation, the 84th district has been in Shelby County.

== List of Representatives ==
| Representative | Party | Years of Service | General Assembly | Hometown |
|---|---|---|---|---|
| Joe Towns | Democratic | 1995 - August 31, 2026* | 99th-114th | Memphis |
| Bret Thompson | Democratic | 1993-1994 | 98th | Memphis |
| David A. Shirley | Democratic | 1981-1992 | 92nd-97th | Memphis |
| Sonny Hartzog | Republican | 1979-1980 | 91st | Memphis |
| Charlie Ashford | Republican | 1971-1978 | 87th-90th | Memphis |

- Joe Towns Jr resigned following election as Shelby County Criminal Court Clerk.
