= Tennessee House of Representatives 36th district =

State legislative district in Tennessee

Tennessee's 36th State House of Representatives district
- Map of Tennessee House districts with the 36th district shaded in red
Representative
| Dennis Powers; R–Jacksboro |
since 2011
- Demographics: 95% White; 0.4% Black; 1.8% Hispanic; 0.1% Asian; 2.5% Multiracial
- Population (2024): 69,891

The Tennessee House of Representatives 36th district is one of 99 legislative districts in the Tennessee House of Representatives. It represents Campbell, Union, and part of Claiborne counties. The district includes La Follette, Jacksboro, New Tazewell, and Maynardville. It has been represented by Dennis Powers since 2011.

== Geography ==
The district is centered around and bisected by Norris Lake. Chuck Swan State Forest, Cove Lake State Park and other nature reserves take up much of the district. It is largely rural, with two separate areas of urbanization on either side of the lake.

== Demographics ==
The Tennessee Comptroller estimates the population as of 2024 at 69,891. The district's poverty level is higher than state medians at 16.9%. Median household income sits at $53,362, compared to the Tennessee median of $69,595.

- 95% of the district is White
- 0.4% of the district is African American
- 1.8% of the district is Hispanic
- 0.1% of the district is Asian
- 2.5% of the district is Two or more races

Detailed demographic information is also available through Census Reporter.

== List of Representatives ==
| Representative | Party | Years of Service | General Assembly | Hometown |
|---|---|---|---|---|
| Dennis Powers | Republican | 2011 – present | 107th-114th | Jacksboro |
| Chad Faulkner | Republican | 2009 – 2010 | 106th | Luttrell |
| William A. Baird | Republican | 1999 – 2008 | 101st-105th | Jacksboro |
| Jerry Cross | Democratic | 1985 – 1998 | 94th-100th | Caryville |
| Mark Robertson | Republican | 1983 - 1984 | 93rd | Tazewell |
| Shirley Duer | Republican | 1981 - 1982 | 92nd | Tazewell |
| David Ledford | Democratic | 1977 – 1980 | 90th-91st | Rockwood |
| Anna Belle O'Brien | Democratic | 1975 – 1976 | 89th | Crossville |
| James A. Melton | Republican | 1973 – 1974 | 88th | Crossville |
