= Tennessee House of Representatives 8th district =

State legislative district in Tennessee

Tennessee's 8th State House of Representatives district
- Map of Tennessee House districts, with the 8th District shaded in red
Representative
Jerome Moon; R–Maryville
- Demographics: 90.7% White; 1.6% Black; 3.5% Hispanic; 0.7% Asian; 0.5% Other; 2.8% Multiracial
- Population: 70,461

The Tennessee House of Representatives 8th district is one of 99 legislative districts included in the lower house of the Tennessee General Assembly. It covers some of Knoxville's suburbs in Blount County, with the exceptions of large portions of Maryville and Alcoa, and all of Friendsville and Louisville. The district includes downtown Maryville, Maryville College, Rockford, Walland, Townsend, McGhee Tyson Airport, and the Blount County portion of the Great Smoky Mountains National Park. The district shares a border with Knox County, Monroe County, and a protracted border with Sevier County. The district has been represented by Jerome Moon, since 2017.

== Demographics ==
According to the Tennessee Comptroller, District 4 had a population of approximately 70,461 as of 2024.

- 90.7% of the district is White
- 1.6% of the district is African American
- 3.7% of the district is Hispanic
- 0.7% of the district is Asian
- 0.5% of the district is another race
- 2.8% of the district is Two or more races

== List of representatives ==
In 1993, the district was redistricted from Greene County to where it is today. The following is a list of the representatives who have represented the HD-08 since 1993:

Representatives	Party	Years of Service	General Assembly	Residence
Mae Stamey Owenby	Democratic	1993-1995	98th	Maryville
Bill Clabough	Republican	1995-1999	99th, 100th	Maryville
Joe McCord	Republican	1999-2011	101st, 102nd, 103rd 104th, 105th, 106th	Maryville
Art Swann	Republican	2011-2017	107th, 108th, 109th	Maryville
Jerome Moon	Republican	2017–present	110th, 111th, 112th	Maryville
