= Bonny Kate, Tennessee =

Unincorporated community in Tennessee, US

Coordinates: 35°53′00″N 83°53′59″W

Bonny Kate is an unincorporated community in Knox County, in the U.S. state of Tennessee.

== History ==
Bonny Kate was the nickname of the wife of John Sevier, first Governor of Tennessee.
