= 2015 Memphis mayoral election =

- October 8, 2015; Officially nonpartisan
- Turnout: 28.0% ▲10.0 pp
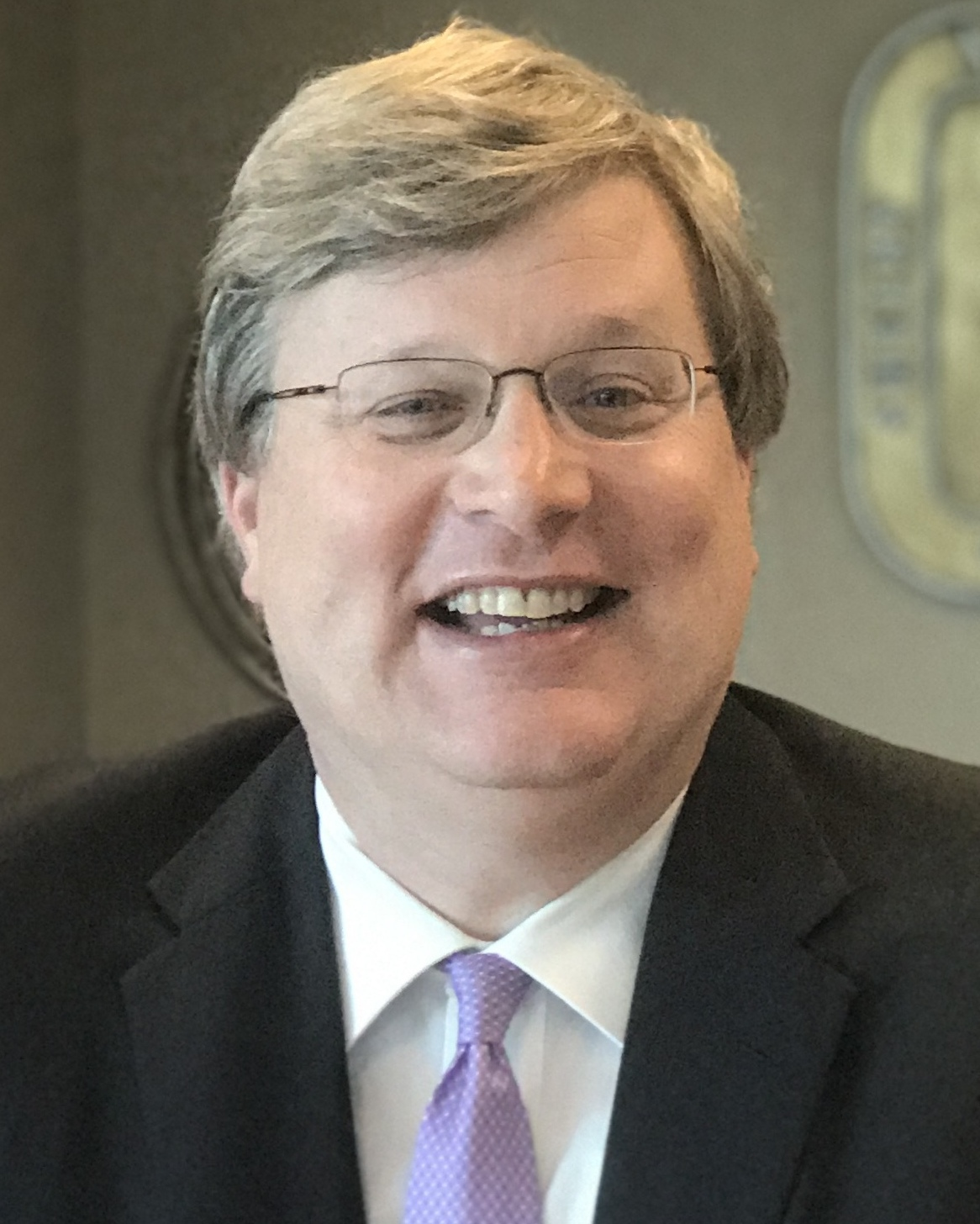

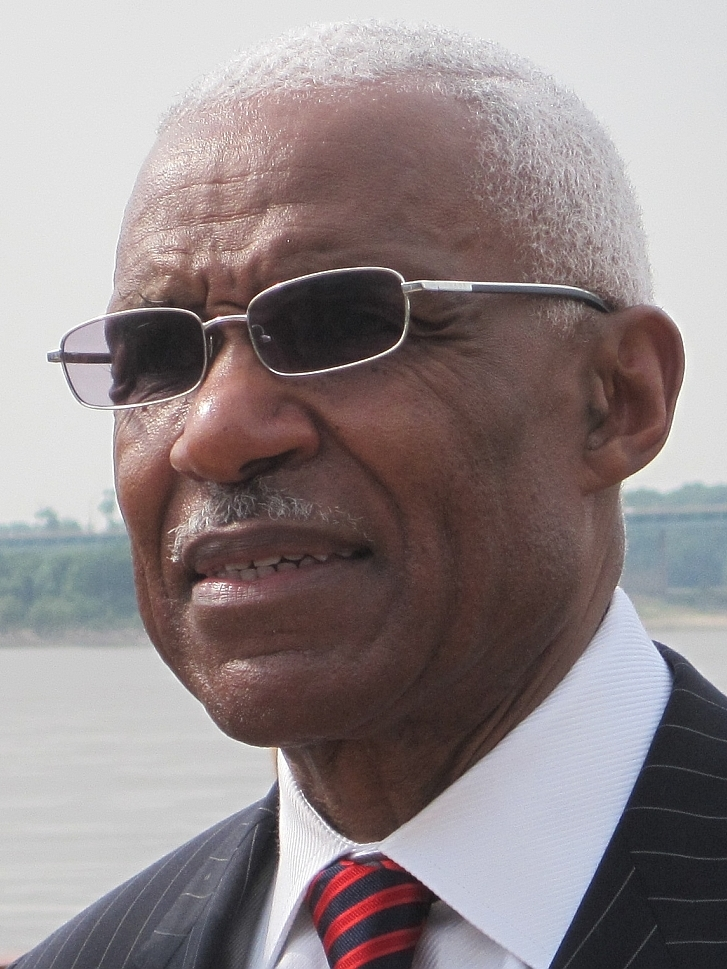
Candidate	Jim Strickland	A C Wharton
Party	Democratic	Democratic
Popular vote	42,020	22,490
Percentage	41.33%	22.12%
Candidate	Harold B. Collins	Mike Williams
Party	Democratic	Democratic
Popular vote	18,767	16,388
Percentage	18.46%	16.12%
- Results by precinct Strickland: 20–30% 30–40% 40–50% 50–60% 60–70% 70–80% 80–90% Wharton: 20–30% 30–40% 40–50% Collins: 20–30% 30–40% 40–50% Williams: 20–30% 30–40% >90% No votes
Mayor before election
A C Wharton
Democratic
Elected mayor
Jim Strickland
Democratic

The 2015 Memphis mayoral election took place on October 8, 2015, to elect the next mayor of Memphis, Tennessee. Incumbent Democratic Mayor A C Wharton ran for re-election to a second full term in office. He was defeated by Memphis City Councilman Jim Strickland, a fellow Democrat, who earned a plurality of the vote and became the first White mayor of Memphis in more than two decades.

The election was officially non-partisan, but each candidate was affiliated with a political party. The mayoral election coincided with elections for the thirteen seats on the Memphis City Council. Due to the 1991 ruling of U.S. District Judge Jerome Turner, there is no runoff allowed in citywide elections.

== General election ==
=== Candidates ===
==== Democratic Party ====
===== Declared =====
- Harold Collins, Memphis City Councillor
- Jim Strickland, Chairman of the Memphis City Council
- A C Wharton, incumbent Mayor
- Mike Williams, President of the Memphis Police Association

===== Potential/Withdrew =====
- Steve Basar, Shelby County Commissioner
- Carol Chumney, former State Representative, former Memphis City Councillor and candidate for Mayor in 2007 and 2009
- Justin Ford, Shelby County Commissioner and member of the Ford family
- Detric Golden, former University of Memphis basketball player
- James Harvey, former Shelby County Commissioner and candidate for Mayor in 2011
- Kenneth Whalum, minister, former School Board member, candidate for Mayor in 2011 and candidate for Mayor of Shelby County in 2014

===== Declined =====
- Edmund Ford Sr., Memphis City Councillor and candidate for Mayor in 2011
- Myron Lowery, Memphis City Councillor, former Mayor pro tempore and candidate for Mayor in 2009
- Jason Smith, State Senator and President of Smith Property Group

=== Campaign ===
Wharton was first elected Mayor in a 2009 special election following the resignation of Mayor Willie Herenton; he was elected to a full term in 2011. As mayor, Wharton oversaw the city's response to the 2009 recession and subsequent budget cuts. Wharton defended his record as mayor, but faced criticism from his challengers on Memphis' high crime rates, slow economic growth, and Wharton's benefits cuts to city workers. Strickland painted himself as a "law and order" candidate and promised to crack down on violent crime in the city, while Harold Collins called for a data-based approach to crime and for increased job training for Memphis residents. On Election Day, Strickland defeated Wharton by nearly twenty percentage points, winning a plurality of the vote.

=== Results ===
2015 Memphis mayoral election results
Party	Candidate	Votes	%
Nonpartisan	Jim Strickland	42,020	41.33%
Nonpartisan	A C Wharton (inc.)	22,490	22.12%
Nonpartisan	Harold Collins	18,767	18.46%
Nonpartisan	Mike Williams	16,388	16.12%
Nonpartisan	Sharon A. Webb	610	0.60%
Nonpartisan	M. Latroy Williams	413	0.41%
Nonpartisan	A. Fullilove, Jr.	369	0.36%
Nonpartisan	Robert Hodges	240	0.24%
Nonpartisan	D. P. Walker, Jr.	171	0.17%
Nonpartisan	Leo AwGoWhat	119	0.12%
Write-in		92	0.09%
Total votes		101,679	100.00%
