= 2019 Memphis mayoral election =

- October 3, 2019; Officially nonpartisan
- Turnout: 26.7% ▼1.3 pp
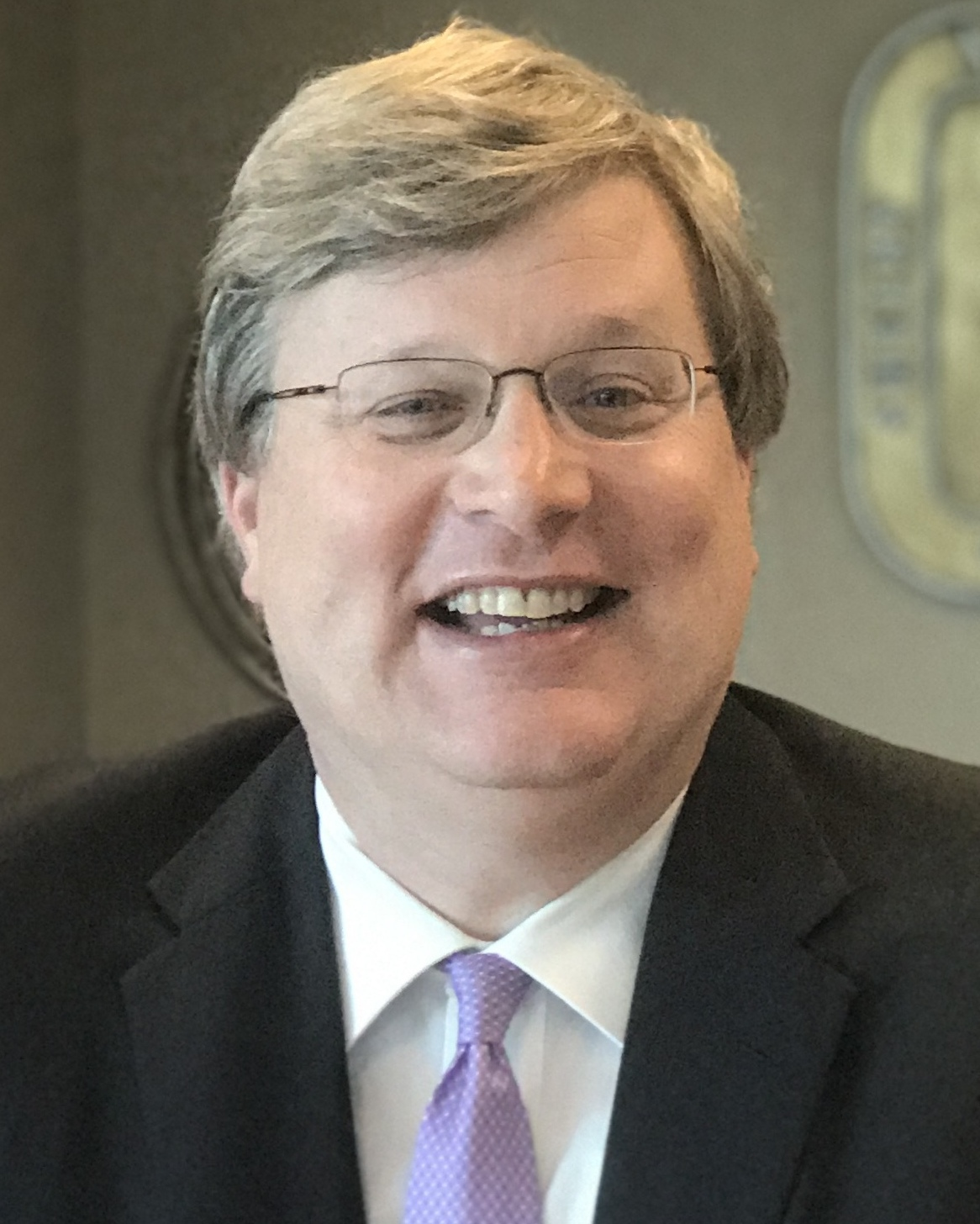

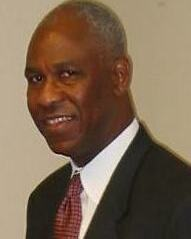
Candidate	Jim Strickland	Willie Herenton
Party	Democratic	Democratic
Popular vote	59,904	27,702
Percentage	62.11%	28.72%
Candidate	Tami Sawyer
Party	Democratic
Popular vote	6,669
Percentage	6.91%
- Results by precinct Strickland: 40–50% 50–60% 60–70% 70–80% 80–90% >90% Herenton: 40–50% 50–60% 60–70% 70–80% 80–90% >90% No votes
Mayor before election
Jim Strickland
Democratic
Elected mayor
Jim Strickland
Democratic

The 2019 Memphis mayoral election took place on October 3, 2019, to elect the mayor of Memphis, Tennessee. Jim Strickland, the incumbent mayor, was re-elected to second term in office. The mayoral election coincided with elections to all thirteen seats on the Memphis City Council.

The election was officially non-partisan, but all three major candidates were members of the Democratic Party.

== General election ==
=== Candidates ===
==== Declared ====
- W. W. Herenton, former Mayor of Memphis and former Superintendent of Memphis City Schools.
- Lemichael Wilson, restaurateur
- Tami Sawyer, Shelby County Commissioner; managing director of External Affairs - Teach For America
- Jim Strickland, incumbent Mayor of Memphis

==== Declined ====
- Keith Norman, pastor and former chairman of the Shelby County Democratic Party
- Van Turner, chairman of the Shelby County Commission
- Mike Williams, president of the Memphis Police Association and candidate for mayor in 2015 (Mr. Williams has publicly defended the Memphis Police Association endorsement of Dr. Herenton

=== Endorsements ===
Jim Strickland
- Mark Billingsley, Shelby County Commissioner
- Reginald Milton, Shelby County Commissioner
- Van Turner, Shelby County Commissioner
- Willie Brooks, Shelby County Commissioner
- Brandon Garrott Morrison, Shelby County Commissioner
- Edmund Ford Jr., Shelby County Commissioner
- Michael Whaley, Shelby County Commissioner
- Mickell Lowery, Shelby County Commissioner
- The Commercial Appeal, Memphis' largest newspaper
W.W. Herenton
- AFSCME Local 1733
- IBEW Local 1288
- Memphis Fire Fighters Association
- Memphis Police Association
Tami Sawyer
- Miska Clay-Bibbs, Shelby County Board of Education member
- Memphis-Midsouth Democratic Socialists of America
- Run for Something

=== Campaign ===
Jim Strickland was elected in 2015, defeating incumbent mayor A C Wharton and becoming the first white mayor of Memphis in more than two decades. His first term was marked by a focus on economic development, the removal of Confederate statues in the city's downtown, and controversy over the police department monitoring Black Lives Matter activists.

Strickland emphasized job growth and an increase in the number of police officers on the Memphis Police Department, while Willie Herenton and Tami Sawyer criticized the city's crime rate. Sawyer emphasized a generational change in leadership and her activism surrounding the removal of Confederate statues in 2017. Strickland was seen as the candidate of the city's business class and those satisfied with the direction of Memphis, while Sawyer relied on a base of young progressive voters and Herenton's base was largely made up of older black voters.

Herenton dismissed Sawyer as "a distraction" in response to concerns that she and Herenton would split the black vote; Sawyer responded by calling Herenton a "misogynist."

Sawyer faced criticism for an old tweet that was posted to Reddit in which she ridiculed a Memphis resident for crying over their recently euthanized dog. In mid-September 2019, further controversial tweets were unearthed from Sawyer's Twitter account, including one where Sawyer seemingly gloats about outing a closeted lesbian teacher.

Throughout the campaign, Strickland led in fundraising and advertising, and he was the only candidate to air television or radio ads.

=== Results ===
2019 Memphis mayoral election results
Party	Candidate	Votes	%
Nonpartisan	Jim Strickland (inc.)	59,904	62.11%
Nonpartisan	Willie Herenton	27,702	28.72%
Nonpartisan	Tami Sawyer	6,669	6.91%
Nonpartisan	Robert Prince Mongo	471	0.49%
Nonpartisan	Sharon A. Webb	445	0.46%
Nonpartisan	Lemichael D. Wilson	305	0.32%
Nonpartisan	Steven Bradley	232	0.24%
Nonpartisan	Terrence T. B. Boyce	228	0.24%
Nonpartisan	David Walker	224	0.23%
Nonpartisan	Leo AwGoWhat	77	0.08%
Nonpartisan	DeAngelos Pegues	64	0.07%
Write-in		134	0.14%
Total votes		96,455	100.00%
