= 2009 Memphis mayoral special election =

- October 15, 2009
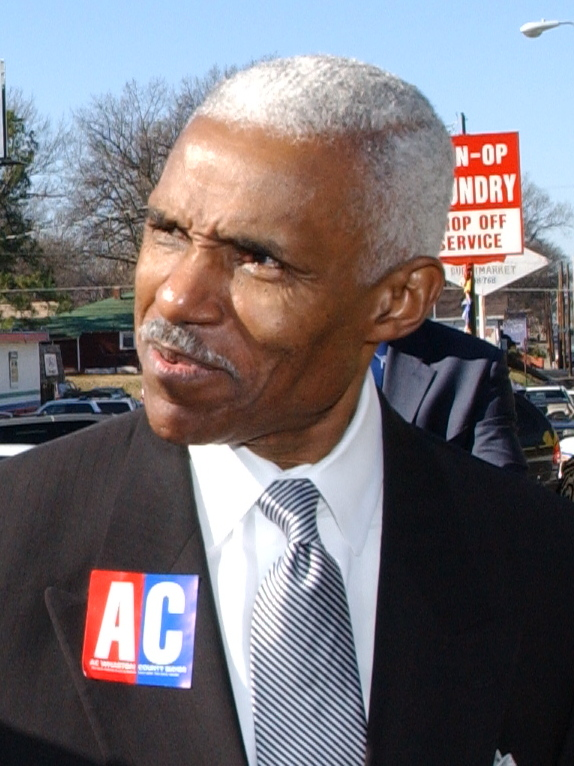

Nominee	A C Wharton	Myron Lowery	Carol Chumney
Party	Nonpartisan	Nonpartisan	Nonpartisan
Popular vote	65,529	19,644	10,863
Percentage	59.89%	17.95%	9.93%
Mayor before election
Myron Lowery (pro tem)
Nonpartisan
Elected Mayor
A C Wharton
Nonpartisan

The 2009 Memphis mayoral special election took place on October 15, 2009. Mayor Willie Herenton resigned on July 30, 2009, in anticipation of his 2010 campaign against Democratic Congressman Steve Cohen. Following Herenton's resignation, City Council Chairman Myron Lowery, a former WMC-TV news reporter, was elevated as Mayor Pro Tem, and served until the special election. Though Herenton suggested that he might run in the ensuing special election because of Lowery's "reckless style of leadership," Herenton ultimately opted not to.

Twenty-five candidates ran in the special election, including Lowery, County Mayor A C Wharton, former City Councilmember Carol Chumney, attorney Charles Carpenter, and professional wrestler Jerry Lawler. Wharton ended up winning the election in a landslide, receiving 60 percent of the vote.

== General election ==
=== Candidates ===
- A C Wharton, Mayor of Shelby County
- Myron Lowery, incumbent Mayor Pro Tem
- Carol Chumney, Memphis City Councilmember, 2007 candidate for Mayor
- Charles Carpenter, attorney, Herenton campaign manager
- Jerry Lawler, former professional wrestler
- Kenneth Whalum, Jr., Memphis City School Board member
- John Willingham, former County Commissioner, 2003 and 2007 candidate for Mayor of Memphis, 2006 Republican nominee for Mayor of Shelby County
- Wanda Halbert, City Councilmember
- Detric W. Stigall, city park services administrator
- Robert Hodges, perennial candidate
- Sharon A. Webb, Memphis City Schools Board member, 2007 candidate for Mayor
- E. C. Jones, former City Councilmember
- Leo AwGoWhat
- Silky Sullivan, Beale Street restaurateur
- Mary Wright
- Dewey Clark, bail bondsman
- Menelik Fombi
- Johnny Hatcher, Jr.
- Randy L. Cagle, businessman, 2007 candidate for Mayor
- James M. Clingan
- David W. Vinciarelli
- Constance Houston
- Ernest A. Lunati
- De Wayne Jones
- Vuong Vaughn Vo

==== Declined ====
- Jack Sammons, former City Councilmember
- Jim Strickland, City Councilmember
- Willie Herenton, former Mayor

=== Polling ===
Poll source	Date(s) administered	Sample size (Note: Key: A – all adults RV – registered voters LV – likely voters V – unclear)	Margin of error	A C Wharton	Carol Chumney	Myron Lowery	Charles Carpenter	Kenneth Whalum Jr.	Jerry Lawler	Leo AwGoWhat	Wanda Halbert	Robert Hodges	Undecided
Mason-Dixon Polling & Strategy	September 14–16, 2009	400 (LV)	± 5.0%	45%	11%	10%	5%	3%	2%	1%	1%	1%	21%
WREG Channel 3 News	October 9–11, 2009	400 (LV)	± 5.0%	53%	9%	16%	3%	5%	4%	–	–	–	7%

=== Results ===
2009 Memphis mayoral special election results
Party	Candidate	Votes	%
Nonpartisan	A C Wharton	65,529	59.89%
Nonpartisan	Myron Lowery (inc.)	19,644	17.95%
Nonpartisan	Carol Chumney	10,863	9.93%
Nonpartisan	Charles Carpenter	5,187	4.74%
Nonpartisan	Jerry Lawler	4,049	3.70%
Nonpartisan	Kenneth Whalum, Jr.	2,099	1.92%
Nonpartisan	John Willingham	438	0.40%
Nonpartisan	Wanda Halbert	372	0.34%
Nonpartisan	Detric W. Stigall	280	0.26%
Nonpartisan	Robert Hodges	267	0.24%
Nonpartisan	Sharon A. Webb	124	0.11%
Nonpartisan	E. C. Jones	85	0.08%
Nonpartisan	Leo AwGoWhat	54	0.05%
Nonpartisan	Silky Sullivan	51	0.05%
Nonpartisan	Mary Wright	42	0.04%
Nonpartisan	Dewey Clark	40	0.04%
Nonpartisan	Menelik Fombi	36	0.03%
Nonpartisan	Johnny Hatcher, Jr.	33	0.03%
Nonpartisan	Randy L. Cagle	29	0.03%
Nonpartisan	James M. Clingan	27	0.02%
Nonpartisan	David W. Vinciarelli	27	0.02%
Nonpartisan	Constance Houston	25	0.02%
Nonpartisan	Ernest A. Lunati	22	0.02%
Nonpartisan	De Wayne Jones	21	0.02%
Nonpartisan	Vuong Vaughn Vo	20	0.02%
Write-in		55	0.05%
Total votes		109,408	100.00%
