= 2007 Memphis mayoral election =

- October 4, 2007
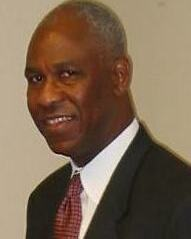

Nominee	Willie Herenton	Carol Chumney	Herman Morris
Party	Nonpartisan	Nonpartisan	Nonpartisan
Popular vote	70,192	57,196	35,161
Percentage	42.44%	34.58%	21.26%
Mayor before election
Willie Herenton
Nonpartisan
Elected Mayor
Willie Herenton
Nonpartisan

The 2007 Memphis mayoral election took place on October 4, 2007. Incumbent Mayor Willie Herenton ran for re-election to a fifth term. Herenton entered the campaign with a negative job approval, and popular Shelby County Mayor A C Wharton was seen as a strong possible opponent. A draft movement attempted to persuade Wharton to challenge Herenton, but he ultimately declined to run. Herenton's leading opponents were City Councilmember Carol Chumney and Herman Morris, the former president and CEO of Memphis Light, Gas and Water. Wharton ultimately won re-election with a plurality of the vote, winning 42 percent of the vote to Chumney's 35 percent and Morris's 21 percent.

However, Wharton would not end up serving his full term as Mayor. In 2009, as he unsuccessfully challenged Democratic Congressman Steve Cohen for re-election in 2010, Herenton resigned as Mayor, triggering a special election.

== General election ==
=== Candidates ===
- Willie Herenton, incumbent Mayor
- Carol Chumney, Memphis City Councilmember
- Herman Morris, former president and CEO of Memphis Light, Gas and Water
- John Herman Willingham, former County Commissioner, 2003 candidate for Mayor
- Sharon A. Webb, Memphis City Schools Board member
- Laura Davis Aaron, perennial candidate
- Carlos F. Boyland, bus driver
- Roosevelt Jamison, U.S. Navy veteran
- DeWayne A. Jones, Sr., businessman
- Fred Askew, retired boxer
- Randy L. Cagle, businessman
- Bill Jacox, perennial candidate
- James McKay
- Bill McAllister, computer systems engineer

==== Declined ====
- A C Wharton, Mayor of Shelby County
- James Perkins, former FedEx executive

==== Disqualified ====
- Billy Smith, former University of Memphis basketball player

=== Polling ===
Poll source	Date(s) administered	Sample size (Note: Key: A – all adults RV – registered voters LV – likely voters V – unclear)	Margin of error	Carol Chumney	Willie Herenton	Herman Morris	John Willingham	James Perkins	Other/ Others	Undecided	Declined
Ethridge and Associates	April 1–3, 2007	500 (LV)	± 4.4%	32%	20%	16%	3%	–	2%	25%	2%
Ethridge and Associates	July 8–10, 2007	500 (LV)	± 4.4%	24%	24%	12%	1%	3%	–	29%	–
Ethridge and Associates	September 23–25, 2007	500 (LV)	± 4.4%	19%	24%	19%	–	–	3%	22%	14%

Hypothetical polling

With A C Wharton

Poll source	Date(s) administered	Sample size	Margin of error	A C Wharton	Carol Chumney	Willie Herenton	Herman Morris	James Perkins	John Willingham	Other	Undecided	Declined
Ethridge and Associates	April 1–3, 2007	500 (LV)	± 4.4%	31%	20%	12%	9%	–	3%	4%	19%	2%
Ethridge and Associates	July 8–10, 2007	500 (LV)	± 4.4%	30%	14%	18%	6%	1%	1%	–	23%	–

=== Results ===
2007 Memphis mayoral election results
Party	Candidate	Votes	%
Nonpartisan	Willie Herenton (inc.)	70,192	42.44%
Nonpartisan	Carol Chumney	57,196	34.58%
Nonpartisan	Herman Morris	35,161	21.26%
Nonpartisan	John H. Willingham	1,118	0.68%
Nonpartisan	Sharon A. Webb	510	0.31%
Nonpartisan	Laura Davis Aaron	181	0.11%
Nonpartisan	Carlos F. Boyland	160	0.10%
Nonpartisan	Roosevelt Jamison	157	0.09%
Nonpartisan	DeWayne A. Jones, Sr.	140	0.08%
Nonpartisan	Fred Askew	126	0.08%
Nonpartisan	Randy L. Cagle	113	0.07%
Nonpartisan	Bill Jacox	95	0.06%
Nonpartisan	James McKay	92	0.06%
Nonpartisan	Bill McAllister	84	0.05%
Write-in		72	0.04%
Total votes		165,397	100.00%
