= David Kustoff =

American politician (born 1966)

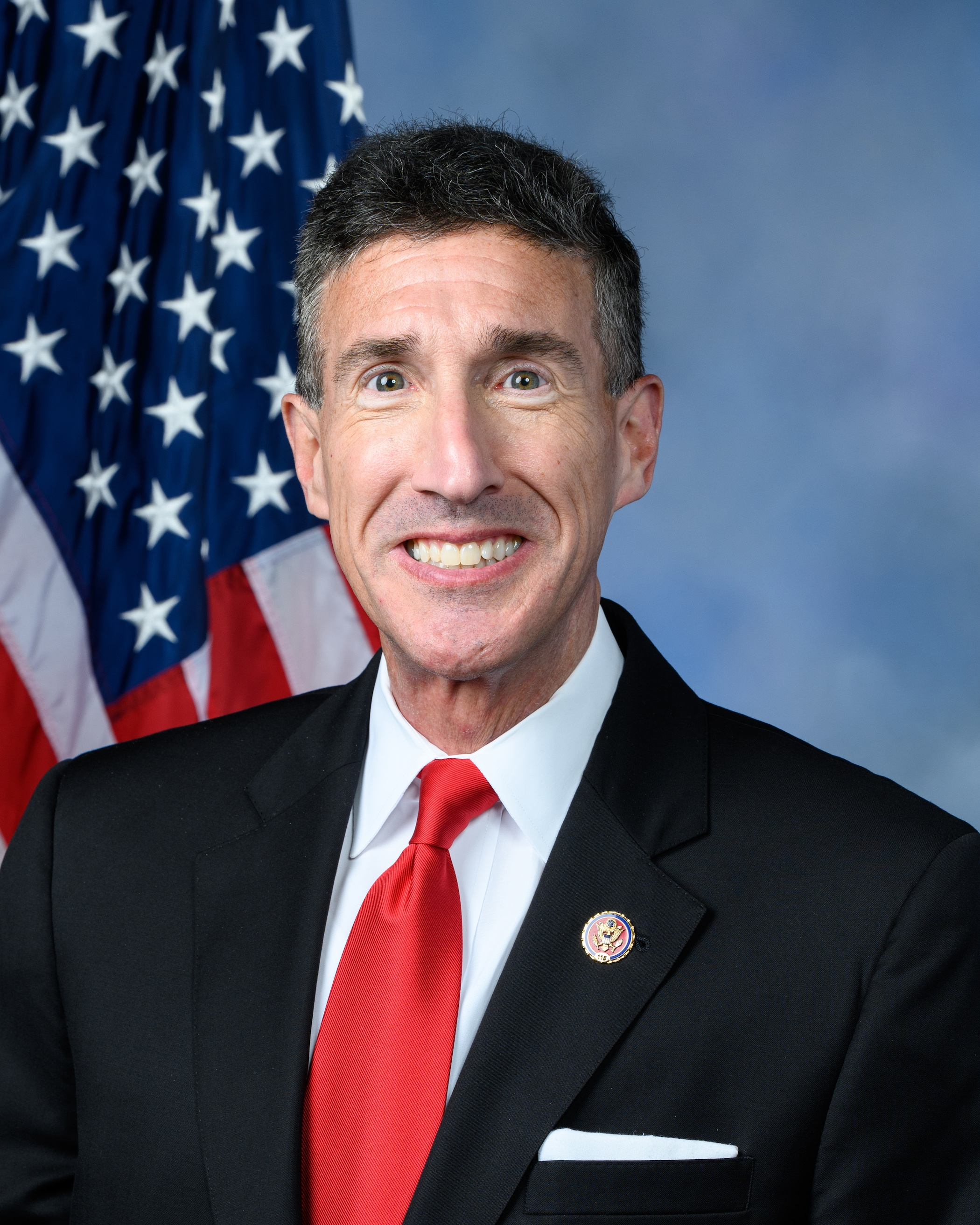
- Official portrait, 2023

Member of the U.S. House of Representatives from Tennessee's 8th district
- Incumbent
- Assumed office January 3, 2017
- Preceded by: Stephen Fincher

United States Attorney for the Western District of Tennessee
- In office March 16, 2006 – May 16, 2008
- President: George W. Bush
- Preceded by: Terrell Harris
- Succeeded by: Edward L. Stanton III

Personal details
- Born: David Frank Kustoff; October 8, 1966 (age 59) Memphis, Tennessee, U.S.
- Party: Republican
- Spouse: Roberta Kustoff
- Children: 2
- Education: University of Memphis (BA, JD)
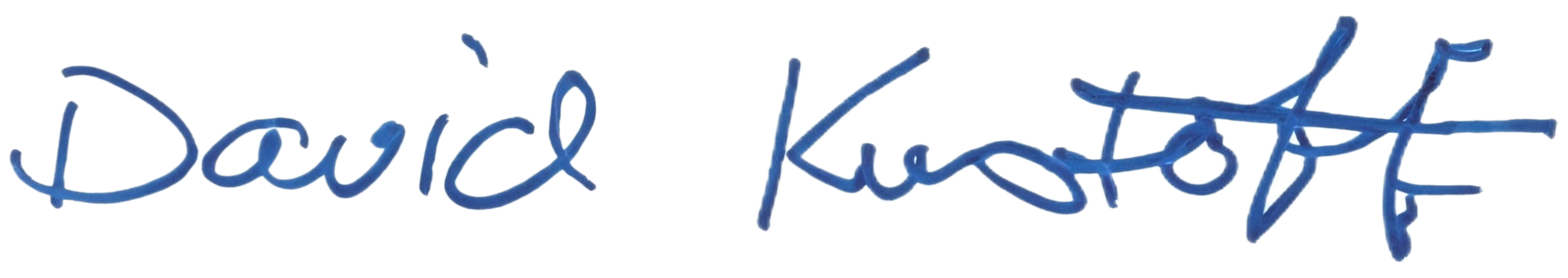
- Signature
- Website: House website Campaign website
- Kustoff's voice Kustoff honoring Major General Jackie Wood, former Tennessee adjutant general. Recorded May 1, 2024

David Frank Kustoff (/ˈkʌstɒf/ KUST-off; born October 8, 1966) is an American politician and attorney serving as the United States representative from Tennessee's 8th congressional district. The district includes the bulk of West Tennessee, but most of its population is in the eastern part of the Memphis area, including the eastern fourth of Memphis itself. From 2006 to 2008, Kustoff served as a United States attorney for the Western District of Tennessee. He is one of four Jewish Republicans in Congress, alongside Max Miller, Randy Fine, and Craig Goldman.

== Early life, education, and career ==
David Frank Kustoff was born in Memphis on October 8, 1966, and raised in the Memphis area. He graduated from Memphis's White Station High School in 1985. Kustoff attended the University of Memphis, graduating Omicron Delta Kappa and with a bachelor's degree in business administration in 1989. He then attended the Cecil C. Humphreys School of Law, graduating in 1992.

In 1998, Kustoff opened a law firm with Jim Strickland, whom he met at the University of Memphis. Both became active in Tennessee politics; Strickland was elected mayor of Memphis in 2015.

== Political career ==
Kustoff became active in politics during the 1990s, when he chaired the Republican Party of Shelby County. He served as George W. Bush's campaign chair in Tennessee during the 2000 and 2004 presidential elections. On August 8, 2002, Kustoff was named campaign chair for Lamar Alexander's 2002 Senate campaign. In December 2002, he criticized Senate minority leader Trent Lott after Lott praised Strom Thurmond for the harm that it would do to Republican outreach to minorities.

In 2002, Representative Ed Bryant announced that he would not seek reelection in Tennessee's 7th congressional district, which at the time included Kustoff's home in eastern Memphis, and would instead run in the senatorial election. On April 3, Kustoff announced that he would seek the Republican nomination to succeed Bryant. He lost the Republican primary to state senator Marsha Blackburn, who won with a plurality of 40.32%. Kustoff finished second with 20.24% of the vote and performed the best in the Memphis area, but two other Memphians split that region's vote. During the primary campaign Kustoff said he had an A+ rating from the National Rifle Association of America (NRA); in fact, the NRA had never rated him. Kustoff had filled out a questionnaire that the NRA said would have given him an A rating; Kustoff's campaign said that the candidate misspoke when he made his claim.

=== United States attorney ===
In 2006, President Bush nominated Kustoff as U.S. attorney for the Western District of Tennessee. The U.S. Senate confirmed him. During his tenure in office, Kustoff prosecuted the Operation Tennessee Waltz, after which John Ford, a prominent Tennessee politician, and others were sent to prison. Kustoff also worked to reduce crime in the Memphis area, joining a group of Memphis leaders and law enforcement officials called Operation Safe Community.

Kustoff resigned as U.S. attorney shortly before the 2008 election and returned to his private practice.

== U.S House of Representatives ==
=== Elections ===
In February 2016, Stephen Fincher announced that he would not run for reelection in Tennessee's 8th congressional district. Kustoff announced his campaign in February; eastern Memphis had been shifted from the 7th to the 8th in the 2010 redistricting. Kustoff began to emerge from the crowded pack when he was endorsed by former Arkansas governor and Republican presidential candidate Mike Huckabee, who filmed ads for Kustoff and campaigned with him. He narrowly won the primary with a plurality of 27.45% of the vote. Shelby County commissioner George Flinn finished second with 23.08%. Kustoff faced Democratic nominee Rickey Hobson, a Delta Air Lines manager and Somerville, Tennessee resident, in the general election. He visited all 15 counties in the district and urged skeptical Republicans to support Donald Trump for the presidency. Kustoff defeated Hobson in the general election, but had effectively assured himself of a seat in Congress with his primary victory. The addition of the Memphis suburbs had turned the 8th into one of the most Republican districts in the nation; with a Cook Partisan Voting Index of R+15, it was the most Republican district in the state outside East Tennessee.

In 2018 George Flinn ran against Kustoff for the Republican nomination and spent millions on his campaign, but Kustoff won with 56.00% of the vote to Flinn's 39.67%.

=== Committee assignments ===
For the 119th Congress:

- Committee on Ways and Means
  - Subcommittee on Health
  - Subcommittee on Tax

=== Caucus memberships ===
- Republican Study Committee

== Political positions ==
=== Health care ===
Kustoff voted for the American Health Care Act in May 2017. "[O]ur current health care system is failing Tennesseans", he said. Later that month, a woman angrily confronted him about that vote during a town hall meeting at the University of Tennessee at Martin; after the meeting ended and Kustoff along with some of his staff got into their car, she gave chase and allegedly attempted to run them off the road, then confronted them again about Kustoff's vote, reportedly banging on the windows of his car in the process. Police later arrested her on a felony charge of reckless endangerment.

=== National security ===
Kustoff supported Trump's 2017 executive order to impose a temporary ban on entry to the U.S. to citizens of seven Muslim-majority countries, saying, "I believe President Trump is putting American safety first, and I will encourage a long-term plan that is consistent with the values and compassion on which our great nation was founded."

=== LGBT rights ===
In December 2022, Kustoff was one of 169 Republicans who voted against the Respect for Marriage Act which would require all U.S states to recognize same-sex marriage. Kustoff voted against the Equality Act which would amend the original Civil Rights Act of 1964 to protect people from discrimination on the basis of sexual orientation or gender identity.

=== Texas v. Pennsylvania ===
In December 2020, Kustoff was one of 126 Republican members of the House of Representatives to sign an amicus brief in support of Texas v. Pennsylvania, a lawsuit filed at the United States Supreme Court contesting the results of the 2020 presidential election, in which Joe Biden prevailed over incumbent Donald Trump. The Supreme Court declined to hear the case on the basis that Texas lacked standing under Article III of the Constitution to challenge the results of an election held by another state.

== Personal life ==
Kustoff is Jewish and married to Roberta Kustoff, who is also a lawyer at the Kustoff and Strickland Firm. They have two children. They live in Germantown, an eastern suburb of Memphis.

Along with Max Miller, Randy Fine, and Craig Goldman, Kustoff is among the only four Republican Jewish members of the House of Representatives.

Kustoff served on the board of directors of BankTennessee and as a member of the Tennessee Higher Education Commission.

== Electoral history ==
David Kustoff electoral history

Tennessee's 7th congressional district Republican primary, 2002
Party	Candidate	Votes	%
Republican	Marsha Blackburn	36,633	40.32%
Republican	David Kustoff	18,392	20.24%
Republican	Brent Taylor	14,139	15.56%
Republican	Mark Norris	13,104	14.42%
Republican	Forrest Shoaf	7,319	8.06%
Republican	Sonny Carlota	642	0.71%
Republican	Randy Starkey	628	0.69%
Write-in		9	0.01%
Total votes		90,866	100.00%

Tennessee's 8th congressional district election, 2016
Primary election
Party	Candidate	Votes	%
Republican	David Kustoff	16,889	27.45%
Republican	George Flinn	14,200	23.08%
Republican	Mark Luttrell	10,878	17.68%
Republican	Brian Kelsey	7,942	12.91%
Republican	Brad Greer	6,819	11.08%
Republican	Tom Leatherwood	2,620	4.26%
Republican	Hunter Baker	1,014	1.65%
Republican	Ken Atkins	410	0.67%
Republican	Raymond Honeycutt	231	0.38%
Republican	George B. Howell	211	0.34%
Republican	David Wharton	131	0.21%
Republican	Dave Bault	109	0.18%
Republican	David J. Maldonado	76	0.12%
Total votes		61,530	100.00%
General election
Republican	David Kustoff	194,386	68.75%
Democratic	Rickey Hobson	70,925	25.09%
Independent	Shelia L. Godwin	6,442	2.28%
Independent	James Hart	4,057	1.43%
Independent	Adrian M. Montague	2,497	0.88%
Independent	Mark J. Rawles	2,445	0.86%
Independent	Karen Free Spirit Talley-Lane	1,981	0.70%
Total votes		282,733	100.00%
Republican hold			

Tennessee's 8th congressional district election, 2018
Primary election
Party	Candidate	Votes	%
Republican	David Kustoff (incumbent)	57,741	56.00%
Republican	George S. Flinn, Jr.	40,903	39.67%
Republican	Colleen Owens	4,460	4.33%
Total votes		103,104	100.00%
General election
Republican	David Kustoff (incumbent)	168,030	67.66%
Democratic	Erika Pearson	74,755	30.10%
Independent	James Hart	5,560	2.24%
Total votes		248,345	100.00%
Republican hold			

Tennessee's 8th congressional district election, 2020
Primary election
Party	Candidate	Votes	%
Republican	David Kustoff (incumbent)	70,677	100.00%
Total votes		70,677	100.00%
General election
Republican	David Kustoff (incumbent)	227,216	68.47%
Democratic	Erika Stotts Pearson	97,890	29.50%
Independent	James L. Hart	3,763	1.13%
Independent	Jon Dillard	2,984	0.90%
Total votes		331,853	100.00%
Republican hold			

Tennessee's 8th congressional district election, 2022
Primary election
Party	Candidate	Votes	%
Republican	David Kustoff (incumbent)	69,538	83.73%
Republican	Bob Hendry	6,990	8.42%
Republican	Danny Ray Bridger, Jr.	4,233	5.10%
Republican	Gary Dean Clouse	2,291	2.76%
Total votes		83,052	100.00%
General election
Republican	David Kustoff (incumbent)	155,602	73.99%
Democratic	Lynnette Williams	51,102	24.30%
Independent	James Hart	2,541	1.21%
Independent	Ronnie Henley	1,070	0.51%
Total votes		210,315	100.00%
Republican hold			

Tennessee's 8th congressional district election, 2024
Primary election
Party	Candidate	Votes	%
Republican	David Kustoff (incumbent)	55,809	100.00%
Total votes		55,809	100.00%
General election
Republican	David Kustoff (incumbent)	240,411	72.34%
Democratic	Sarah Freeman	85,043	25.59%
Independent	James Hart	6,861	2.06%
Total votes		332,315	100.00%
Republican hold			

== See also ==
- List of Jewish American jurists
- List of Jewish members of the United States Congress

Legal offices
Preceded by Terrell Harris	United States Attorney for the Western District of Tennessee; 2006–2008	Succeeded by Edward L. Stanton III
U.S. House of Representatives
Preceded by Stephen Fincher	Member of the U.S. House of Representatives from Tennessee's 8th congressional district 2017–present	Incumbent
U.S. order of precedence (ceremonial)
Preceded by Raja Krishnamoorthi	United States representatives by seniority 172nd	Succeeded by Brian Mast
