= 2023 Memphis mayoral election =

- October 5, 2023; Officially nonpartisan
- Turnout: 23.8% ▼2.9 pp
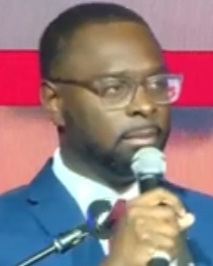

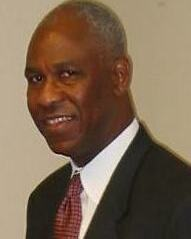

Candidate	Paul Young	Floyd Bonner
Party	Democratic	Democratic
Popular vote	24,420	19,900
Percentage	27.64%	22.53%
Candidate	Willie Herenton	Van Turner
Party	Democratic	Democratic
Popular vote	18,994	18,784
Percentage	21.50%	21.26%
- Results by precinct Young: 20–30% 30–40% 40–50% 50–60% Bonner: 20–30% 30–40% 40–50% 50–60% Herenton: 20–30% 30–40% 40–50% Turner: 20–30% 30–40% Tie: 20–30% 40–50% No votes
Mayor before election
Jim Strickland
Democratic
Elected mayor
Paul Young
Democratic

The 2023 Memphis mayoral election took place on October 5, 2023, to elect the next mayor of Memphis, Tennessee. Incumbent Jim Strickland was term-limited and could not seek re-election to a third term in office. The election used the plurality vote system, with no possibility of a runoff. The election was officially non-partisan, but several candidates were affiliated with political parties.

Municipal government official Paul Young won the election, with all other major candidates conceding on the night of the election. Young prevailed with a low plurality of the vote against numerous other candidates, including Shelby County Sheriff Floyd Bonner, former mayor Willie Herenton, and former Shelby County commission chair Van Turner.

== Background ==
=== Ordinance 5823 ===
Memphis law states that mayors can only serve two terms. However, the Memphis City Council voted to put an ordinance on the ballot that, if passed, would extend the limit to three terms. Incumbent mayor Jim Strickland expressed interest in running for a third term if Memphis voters approved the ordinance. The ordinance was decided on August 4, 2022, the same day as Tennessee's regularly scheduled primary elections. Voters overwhelmingly rejected it, keeping the two-term limit in place and barring Strickland from seeking re-election.

Memphis Ordinance 5823
Choice	Votes	%
Against	52,582	66.27%
For	26,759	33.73%
Total votes	79,341	100.00%

Precinct results Against: 70–80%; 60–70%; 50–60%; No data

=== Early voting ===
Early voting ran from September 16, 2023, to September 30, 2023. Turnout was the highest since 2007, with 57,951 votes being submitted. This compares to 52,718 early votes in 2019 and 51,840 in 2015.

== Candidates ==
=== Declared ===
The following 17 candidates were on the ballot: (Note: Key: D – Democratic Party I – Independent R – Republican Party)

- Carnita Atwater, community organizer and Democratic candidate for Governor of Tennessee in 2022 (I)
- Jennings Bernard, private probation company owner (I)
- Floyd Bonner, Shelby County Sheriff (D)
- Joe Brown, former host of Judge Joe Brown and former Shelby County Criminal Court judge (I)
- Kendra Calico, hunger relief charity president (I)
- Karen Camper, Minority Leader of the Tennessee House of Representatives (D)
- J.W. Gibson, former Shelby County commissioner
- Reggie Hall, life coach
- James Harvey, former Democratic chair of the Shelby County Commission (R)
- Willie Herenton, former mayor (D)
- Michelle McKissack, chair of the Shelby County Board of Education (D)
- Brandy Price, activist (D)
- Justina Ragland
- Tekeva Shaw, life coach
- Van Turner, former chair of the Shelby County Commission (D)
- Derek Winn, bakery assistant (I)
- Paul Young, president and CEO of the Downtown Memphis Commission and former director of the Memphis Division of Housing and Community Development (D)

=== Withdrawn ===
- Frank Colvett, city councilor (R); withdrew July 27, 2023

== Endorsements ==
Floyd Bonner

Organizations

- Memphis Police Association
- Memphis Fire Fighters Association
Van Turner

Federal politicians

- Steve Cohen, U.S. Representative, TN-9

State legislators

- Justin Pearson, state representative

County officials

- Lee Harris, mayor of Shelby County

Labor unions

- AFSCME Local 1733

Organizations

- Planned Parenthood Tennessee (co-endorsement with Paul Young)
- Stand for Children
Paul Young

Individuals

- Craig Brewer, film director
- NLE Choppa, rapper
- Elliot Perry, former professional basketball player

Organizations

- Planned Parenthood Tennessee (co-endorsement with Van Turner)
- Shelby County Young Democrats

== Polling ==
Poll source	Date(s) administered	Sample size (Note: Key: A – all adults RV – registered voters LV – likely voters V – unclear)	Margin of error	Floyd Bonner	Joe Brown	Karen Camper	Frank Colvett	J.W. Gibson	Willie Herenton	Michelle McKissack	Van Turner	Paul Young	Undecided
Hart Research	Sept. 5-7 2023	-	± 5%	19%	4%	1%	-	5%	13%	3%	9%	20%	23%
Emerson College	August 11–13, 2023	600 (LV)	± 3.9%	10%	10%	≤1%	-	5%	16%	3%	7%	14%	26%
HIT Strategies	May 2023	400 (LV)	± 4.9%	9%	4%	1%	4%	1%	13%	2%	9%	8%	48%
Caissa Public Strategy	May 2023	600 (LV)	± 4.0%	15%	9%	3%	3%	3%	15%	6%	17%	8%	21%
Caissa Public Strategy	February 2023	1,000 (LV)	± 4.7%	15%	3%	4%	3%	2%	14%	4%	16%	12%	13%

== Campaign finance ==
2022-2023 Campaign Finance Reporting
Candidate	Total Receipts	Total Disbursements	Cash on Hand (Note: As of September 25, 2023)	Loans Outstanding
Floyd Bonner	$757,346	$600,102	$157,244	$34,951
Karen Camper	$125,567	$109,716	$15,851	$4,500
Frank Colvett	$157,450	$125,924	$31,526	$0
J.W. Gibson	$401,473	$398,380	$3,093	$300,000
Willie Herenton	$105,293	$54,652	$50,641	$0
Michelle McKissack	$155,957	$133,434	$22,523	$25,000
Van Turner	$564,435	$450,790	$133,645	$0
Paul Young	$1,059,250	$855,283	$203,967	$0

== Results ==
2023 Memphis mayoral election results
Party	Candidate	Votes	%
Nonpartisan	Paul A. Young	24,420	27.64%
Nonpartisan	Floyd Bonner	19,900	22.53%
Nonpartisan	Willie Herenton	18,994	21.50%
Nonpartisan	Van Turner	18,784	21.26%
Nonpartisan	J. W. Gibson	2,176	2.46%
Nonpartisan	Michelle McKissack	1,437	1.63%
Nonpartisan	Joe Brown	1,030	1.17%
Nonpartisan	Karen Camper	591	0.67%
Nonpartisan	James Harvey	325	0.37%
Nonpartisan	Brandy A. Price	129	0.15%
Nonpartisan	Carnita Atwater	122	0.14%
Nonpartisan	Tekeva "Keva" Shaw	95	0.11%
Nonpartisan	Jennings Bernard	89	0.10%
Nonpartisan	Reggie Hall	77	0.09%
Nonpartisan	Kendra C. Calico	58	0.07%
Nonpartisan	Derek Winn	57	0.06%
Nonpartisan	Justina Ragland	53	0.06%
Total votes		88,337	100.00%
