= Tennessee House of Representatives 82nd district =

State legislative district in Tennessee

Tennessee's 82nd State House of Representatives district
- Map of Tennessee House districts with the 82nd District shaded in red
Representative
Chris Hurt; R–Halls
since 2019
- Demographics: 70.1% White; 18.6% Black; 5.4% Hispanic; 0.5% Asian; 4.7% Multiracial
- Population (2024): 65,690

The Tennessee House of Representatives 82nd district is one of the 99 legislative districts in the lower house of the Tennessee General Assembly. The district is located in West Tennessee and covers Crockett, Lauderdale, and parts of Gibson and Obion counties. The district includes Obion, Medina, Bells, and Alamo. It also includes Ripley, Halls, Friendship, and parts of Humboldt, and Gibson. Much of the district is unincorporated and largely rural. Chris Hurt has represented the district since 2019.

== Demographics ==
The Tennessee Comptroller estimates the population as of 2024 at 65,690.

- 70.1% of the district is White
- 18.6% of the district is Black
- 5.4% of the district is Hispanic
- 0.5% of the district is Asian
- 0.3% of the district is some other race alone
- 4.7% of the district is Two or more races

Detailed demographic information is also available through Census Reporter.

== History ==
The 88th Tennessee General Assembly was the first in which all districts were numbered. At this time, the 82nd district was in Shelby County. At the 93rd, it was made up of Haywood, Lauderdale and Madison counties. From the 94th-97th GAs it was in Haywood and Lauderdale counties. From the 98th-101st GAs, it was in Haywood, Lauderdale, and part of Hardeman counties. At the 102nd, it was composed of Haywood, Lauderdale, and part of Fayette counties. From the 103rd-107th, it was composed of Crockett, Lauderdale, and part of Dyer counties. From the 108th-112th it was composed of Crockett, Lauderdale, and Haywood counties. Since the 113th General Assembly, it has been composed of Crockett, Lauderdale, and part of Gibson, and Obion counties.

== List of Representatives ==
Representative	Party	Years of Service	General Assembly	Hometown
Chris Hurt	Republican	2019-present	111th-114th	Halls
Craig Fitzhugh	Democratic	1995-2018	99th-110th	Ripley
Floyd Crain	Democratic	1983-1994	93rd-98th	Ripley
U. A. Presnell Moore	Republican	1973-1982	88th-92nd	Memphis
