= 2011 Memphis mayoral election =

- October 6, 2011
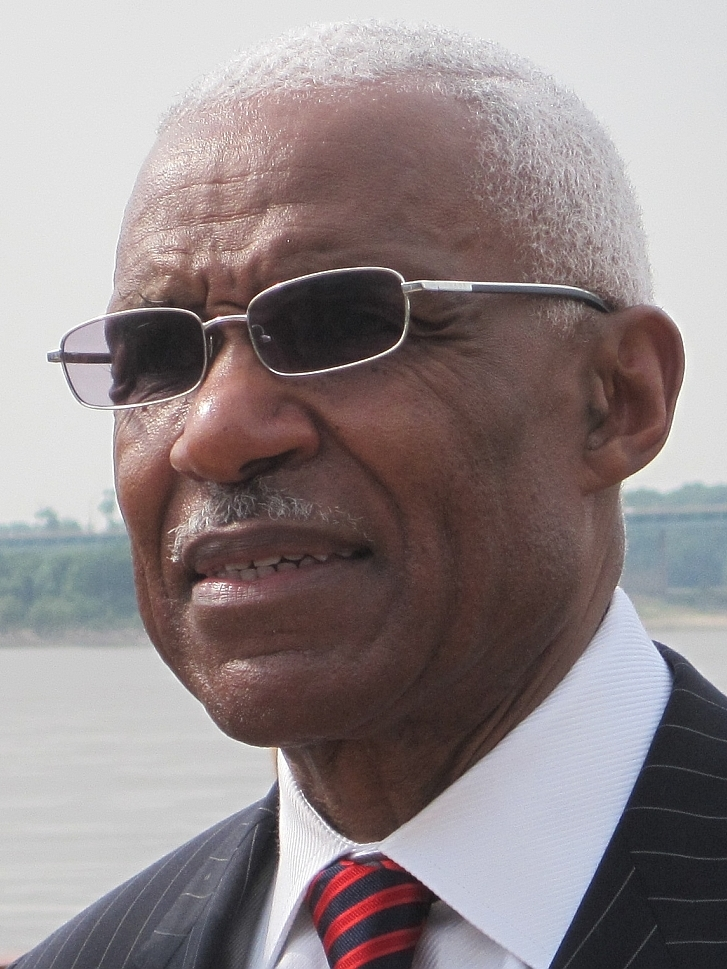

Nominee	A C Wharton	Edmund H. Ford, Sr.
Party	Nonpartisan	Nonpartisan
Popular vote	48,645	20,911
Percentage	65.35%	28.09%
Mayor before election
A C Wharton
Nonpartisan
Elected Mayor
A C Wharton
Nonpartisan

The 2011 Memphis mayoral election took place on October 6, 2011. Incumbent Mayor A C Wharton, who was first elected in a 2009 special election, ran for re-election to a full term. He was challenged by a large field of candidates, the most well-known of whom were former City Councilmember Edmund Ford, Sr., and County Commissioner James Harvey. Wharton, who won the 2009 election in a landslide, remained popular, and won the "enthusiastic endorsement" of the Commercial Appeal, which praised his "considerable skills in efforts to attract new job-creating industries to Memphis" and "balanced approach in June during a difficult budget season."

Wharton ultimately won re-election by a wide margin, receiving 65 percent of the vote to Ford's 28 percent and Harvey's 3 percent.

== General election ==
=== Candidates ===
- A C Wharton, incumbent Mayor
- Edmund Ford, Sr., former City Councilmember
- James Harvey, County Commissioner
- Kenneth B. Robinson
- Robert Hodges
- Marty Merriweather
- James R. Barbee
- Carlos F. Boyland
- Leo AwGoWhat
- DeWayne DEA Jones

=== Results ===
2011 Memphis mayoral election results
Party	Candidate	Votes	%
Nonpartisan	A C Wharton (inc.)	48,645	65.35%
Nonpartisan	Edmund Ford, Sr.	20,911	28.09%
Nonpartisan	James Harvey	2,053	2.76%
Nonpartisan	Kenneth B. Robinson	774	1.04%
Nonpartisan	Robert Hodges	751	1.01%
Nonpartisan	Marty Merriweather	442	0.59%
Nonpartisan	James R. Barbee	310	0.42%
Nonpartisan	Carlos F. Boyland	170	0.23%
Nonpartisan	Leo AwGoWhat	141	0.19%
Nonpartisan	DeWayne DEA Jones	79	0.11%
Write-in		160	0.21%
Total votes		74,436	100.00%
