= John Herman Willingham =

American inventor and pitmaster (1932-2013)

John Willingham
- Willingham at Memphis in May, 2012
- Born: John Herman Willingham; May 19, 1932; Bevier, Missouri, U.S.
- Died: May 15, 2013 (aged 80); Memphis, Tennessee, U.S.
- Education: University of Missouri
- Occupations: Inventor, barbecue competitor, restaurateur
- Known for: W'ham Turbo Cooker; Memphis in May Barbecue Championship
- Spouse: Marjorie Yock
- Children: 3

John Herman Willingham (May 19, 1932 – May 15, 2013) was an American barbecue competitor, inventor, restaurateur, and politician from Memphis, Tennessee. He won the Memphis in May World Championship Barbecue Cooking Contest in 1983 and 1984, and the top professional division of the American Royal barbecue contest in 1984 and 1991.

Willingham developed barbecue equipment and other patented products, including the W'ham Turbo Cooker. He served as a Shelby County Commissioner, made several campaigns for mayor of Memphis and of Shelby County, and was inducted into the American Royal Barbecue Hall of Fame as a Legacy Inductee in 2012.

== Early life and education ==
John Herman Willingham was born on May 19, 1932, in Bevier, Missouri. He attended the University of Missouri on a football and baseball scholarship. The Missouri baseball team finished second at the College World Series in 1952, with Willingham on the roster. He signed a professional contract to pitch for the St. Louis Cardinals organization, but was inducted into the United States Army in 1953, serving until 1955. He returned to professional baseball afterward, playing in the Cardinals organization through 1956, when an injury ended his playing career. He married Marjorie Yock. They had three daughters: Kristi, Karla, and Kara.

== Inventions and business ==
After his military service, Willingham worked in the construction industry. He spent five years in the precast-concrete construction business in Little Rock, Arkansas, with former Arkansas governor Winthrop Rockefeller, and later held a post at the United States Department of Housing and Urban Development during the Nixon administration.

Willingham was named on 17 U.S. patents. His earliest was granted in 1961 for a dispenser for material containers. Later patents covered concrete form surfacing, a crane boom attachment, systems of industrialized building construction using precast Tee-shaped concrete elements, and portable concrete molding apparatus. A patent issued on May 27, 1986, described an indirect-heat cooker. The cooker was marketed as the W'ham Turbo Cooker. According to a 2013 Commercial Appeal profile, it was promoted as a way to reduce carcinogens produced during cooking. One of the original cookers was provided to the American Royal Barbecue Hall of Fame Museum in Kansas City in 2015.

In November 2011, Willingham filed an application for a hydroelectric paddlewheel system for high-flow rivers. The application cited the Mississippi River at Memphis as a possible use. The patent was granted on July 8, 2014, about fourteen months after his death. A continuation patent was granted on January 5, 2016. Both patents were assigned to Power Flo LLC.

His other inventions included the Harmonic Stress Releaser, a therapeutic device developed for his wife Marjorie's migraine headaches; and a nasal spray bottle design. Smart City Memphis reported that his precast-concrete building method, which he called the T Mobile Pre-Cast Concrete Molding Machine and Sub-systems, was the subject of a panel discussion with Buckminster Fuller at the Massachusetts Institute of Technology in the early 1970s.

Willingham opened his first restaurant in Collierville, Tennessee. A restaurant at Perkins Road and American Way operated from 1985 to 1987. A fire gutted the Brookhaven Circle location on August 2, 2001, and the business relocated to a former Shoney's building in the Parkway Village neighborhood. He founded Whamco, Inc. to manufacture and distribute Willingham's dry rubs, marinades, and sauces.

== Barbecue career ==
Willingham and his team, the River City Rooters, won the Overall Grand Championship at the Memphis in May World Championship Barbecue Cooking Contest in 1983, placing first in the ribs division, and again in 1984. A 1996 profile in The Commercial Appeal described Willingham as a "barbecue impresario."

The River City Rooters won the American Royal's top professional division in 1984 — then called the commercial division — the same year as their Memphis in May title. They won it again in 1991, when the top event was known as the American Royal/K.C. Masterpiece International Invitational Contest, and also took first place in the brisket and pork categories.

Willingham's restaurant won the "Best Ribs in America" prize at the National Rib Cook-Off in Cleveland in 1990 and again in 1991, taking a $25,000 award.

Willingham's team competed at Memphis in May for thirty years, and he won in several event categories over that period.

Nathan Myhrvold, co-founder of Modernist Cuisine, contacted Willingham in 1991 after reading about his cooker and later competed as a member of Willingham's team at the Memphis in May contest. Members of the Modernist Cuisine staff continued to compete on the Willingham team after his death.

In 1999, Willingham appeared on the television cooking series Home Cooking with Amy Coleman, which he had taped the previous summer in Vancouver.

== Cookbook ==
In 1996, William Morrow and Company published John Willingham's World Champion Bar-B-Q: Over 150 Recipes and Tall Tales for Authentic, Braggin' Rights, Real Southern Bar-B-Q, and All the Fixin's (ISBN 978-0-688-13287-3). The Commercial Appeal reviewed the book. It also received reviews in The Sun News and the Arizona Daily Sun, and recipes from it were adapted in a St. Louis Post-Dispatch barbecue feature previewing the American Royal.

== Public service ==
In 1996 Willingham ran in the Republican primary for Tennessee's 9th congressional district, seeking the seat being vacated by Harold Ford Sr.. He finished second in a six-candidate race behind Rod DeBerry. He was elected to the Shelby County Commission in 2002, where he proposed a county payroll tax intended to replace the local option sales tax, the wheel tax, and part of the property tax.

Willingham ran for mayor of Memphis in 2003, losing to incumbent Willie Herenton, who won a fourth consecutive term. Following the election Willingham filed suit in Chancery Court alleging fraud or other irregularities, seeking to overturn the result or force a recount; the suit offered no specific evidence, though Willingham and his lawyer said they were investigating claims that votes from newly annexed areas went uncounted. He was also a candidate for Shelby County mayor in 2006. The following year, Willingham contested the Nemphis mayoral election for a second time.

== Recognition ==
Willingham was inducted into the National Barbecue Hall of Fame; by 2009 he was billed as a Hall of Fame inductee. After the American Royal acquired the Hall of Fame, he was listed as a Legacy Inductee alongside inductees including Henry Ford, Johnny Trigg, and Guy Fieri.

== Death ==
Willingham died on May 15, 2013, at St. Francis Hospital in Memphis, Tennessee, of heart failure. He was 80 years old. He died as that year's Memphis in May World Championship Barbecue Cooking Contest was opening. Don Pelts, founder of Corky's Barbecue in Memphis, died the following morning.

Willingham donated his body to medical research. He was survived by his wife, Marjorie Yock Willingham, and three daughters.
