= Karen Camper =

American politician (born 1958)

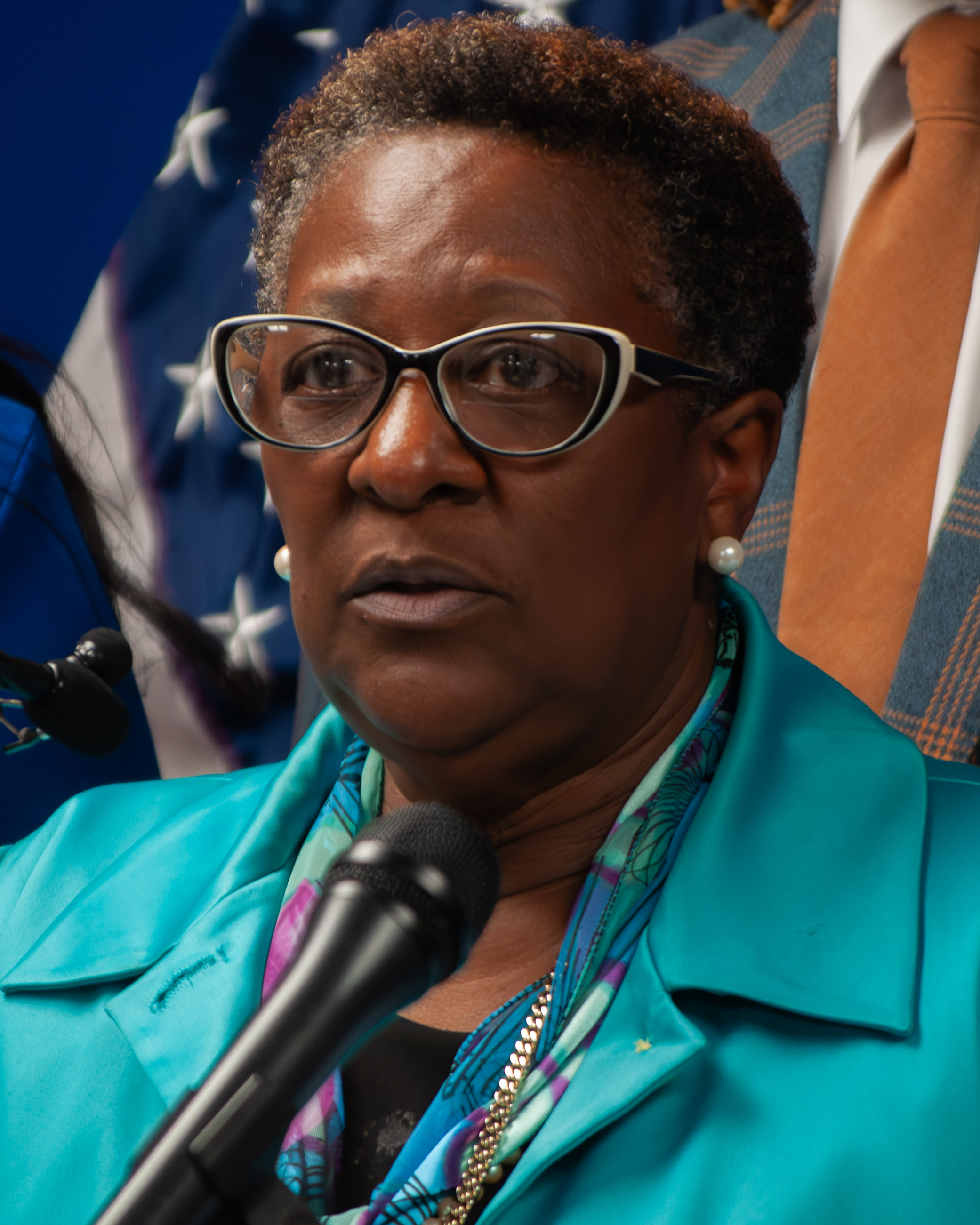
- Camper in 2023

Minority Leader of the Tennessee House of Representatives
- Incumbent
- Assumed office January 8, 2019
- Preceded by: Craig Fitzhugh

Member of the Tennessee House of Representatives from the 87th district
- Incumbent
- Assumed office March 31, 2008
- Preceded by: Gary Rowe

Personal details
- Born: January 15, 1958 (age 68) Memphis, Tennessee, U.S.
- Party: Democratic
- Spouse: Divorced
- Children: 1
- Education: SUNY Albany (AS); University of Tennessee (BA)
- Website: House website
- Military career
- Allegiance: United States
- Branch: United States Army
- Rank: Chief Warrant Officer

Karen D. Camper (born January 15, 1958) is an American politician serving as Tennessee's House Minority Leader, a position she has held since 2019. She is the first Black person to serve as a party leader in the Tennessee House of Representatives. A member of the Democratic Party, Camper has served as the representative for the 87th district since 2008. She was a candidate in the 2023 Memphis mayoral election.

== Early life and education ==
Karen D. Camper was born on January 15, 1958, in Memphis, Tennessee. While she was still young, her family relocated to Chicago. Camper was raised in the Robert Taylor Homes, a large public housing project on the city's South Side.

When she was 11, Camper's uncle passed away, triggering a move back to Memphis. She graduated from South Side High School, and then left the state once more to attend the University at Albany, where she earned an AS — she later returned to Tennessee to study computer science at the University of Tennessee. However, before her junior year, Camper was recruited to the United States Army.

== Career ==
Though she initially intended to spend only four years with the military before returning to complete her degree, Camper eventually worked over two decades in the Army. While serving, she spent time in Hawaii, Korea, and Germany. During her tenure, she reached the rank of chief warrant officer.

After returning to the States, Camper began working as a substitute teacher for Memphis City Schools. She also opened a nonprofit organization aimed to teach young people interested in the performing arts the business skills useful for succeeding in the entertainment industry.

== Tennessee House of Representatives (2008–present) ==
=== Elections ===
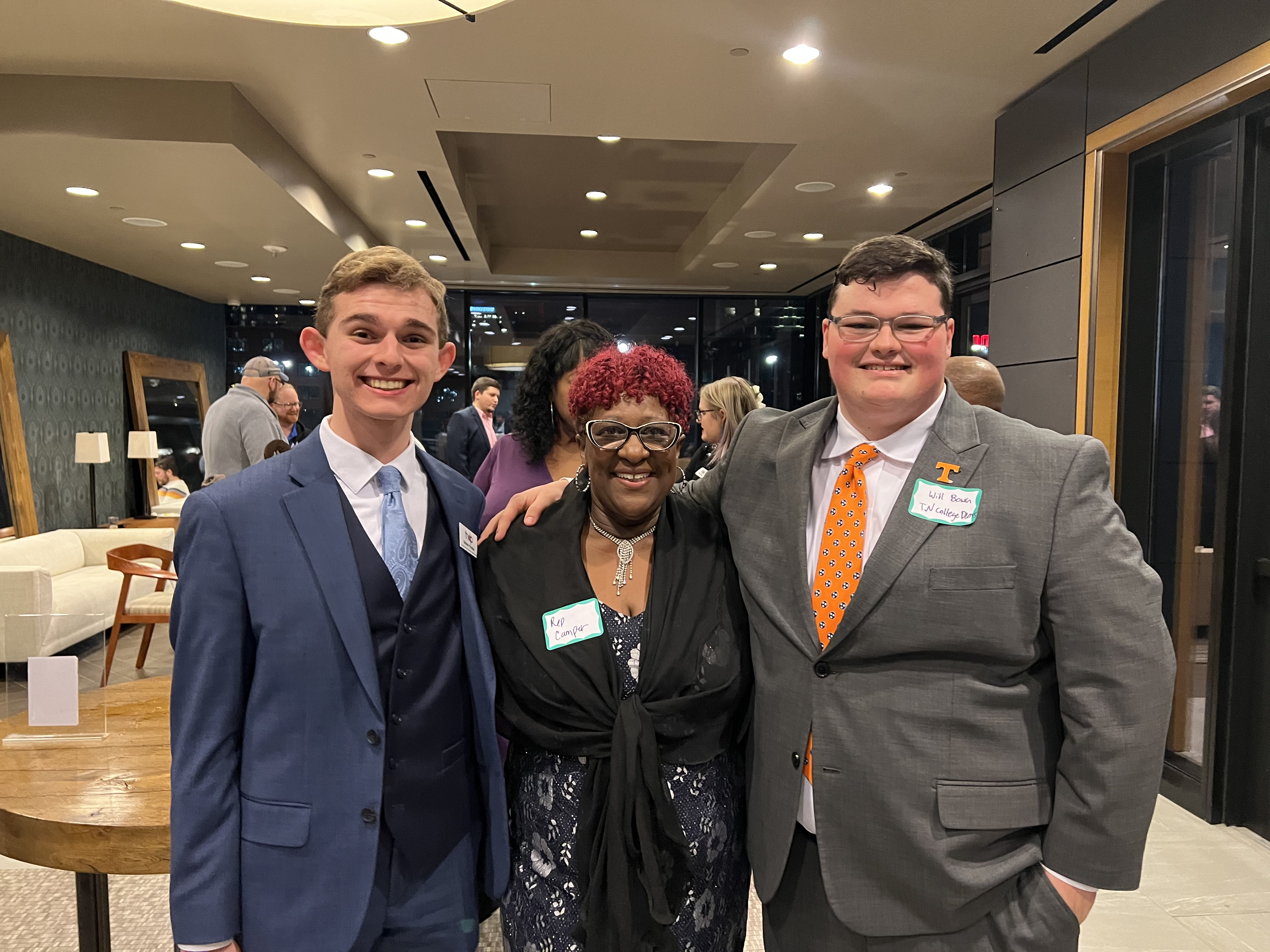
Camper with leaders of the Tennessee College Democrats in 2023

Camper's first election was for a seat on the Memphis City Council. She lost the election; however, in 2008, she was appointed by the Shelby County Commission to represent the 87th district in the Tennessee House of Representatives after incumbent Gary Rowe died in office. Camper later won the special election to complete the term.

In 2008, Camper was challenged in the Democratic primary by Jennings Bernard. She handily won the election with 66.8 percent of the votes, and was unopposed in the subsequent general election. In 2010, Camper was again challenged in the primary election, this time by Justin H. Settles. She increased her margin, winning 75.6 percent of the votes, and again ran unopposed in the general election. In 2012, Camper was unopposed in both the primary and general elections.

=== Tenure ===
Camper was elected on December 17, 2018, to be the Leader of the Tennessee House Democratic Caucus, making her the first Black party leader in the Tennessee House of Representatives. In 2024, she defeated G. A. Hardaway to retain the position.

On November 11, 2022, Camper announced she was running in the 2023 Memphis mayoral election.

== Personal life ==
Camper is a Baptist. She is divorced and has one child.

Camper is an honorary member of Zeta Phi Beta. She was inducted into the Alpha Omega chapter on July 11, 2026 at the Grand Boule in Nashville, Tennessee.

Tennessee House of Representatives
Preceded by Craig Fitzhugh	Minority Leader of the Tennessee House of Representatives; 2019–present	Incumbent
