= Chris Hurt =

American politician (born 1972)

- Hurt in 2026

Member of the Tennessee House of Representatives from the 82nd district
- Incumbent
- Assumed office January 8, 2019
- Preceded by: Craig Fitzhugh

Personal details
- Born: July 5, 1972 (age 54)
- Party: Republican
- Spouse: Dawn Hurt
- Children: 5
- Education: Lambuth University (BS)
- Website: House website Campaign website

Chris Hurt (born July 5, 1972) is an American politician. A Republican, he represents the 82nd district, which contains parts of Lauderdale, Haywood, and Crockett counties, in the Tennessee House of Representatives.

== Biography ==
Chris Hurt attended Halls High School in Halls, Tennessee, and received a Bachelor of Science from Lambuth University. He was a teacher and the head football coach at Halls High School from 2000 to 2014. He is also a real estate broker.

Hurt was first elected to the Tennessee House of Representatives in 2018. He serves on the Commerce Committee, Business Subcommittee, Education Committee, Higher Education Subcommittee, Transportation Committee, and Infrastructure Subcommittee.

In 2023, Hurt supported a resolution to expel three Democratic lawmakers from the legislature for violating decorum rules. The expulsion was widely characterized as unprecedented.

== Political positions ==
Hurt self-identifies as a conservative Republican. He self identifies as "100% pro-life". He opposes same-sex marriage, and supports gun rights. He opposes illegal immigration and sanctuary cities.

In February 2022, Hurt introduced a bill, HB 254, that would designate "a person who has been issued an enhanced handgun carry permit" as a member of law enforcement. A similar bill, SB 2523, was introduced in the state senate by Joey Hensley. A Hensley spokesperson said the bill would only allow someone to carry a gun where the police can. The Tennessee State Lodge for the Fraternal Order of Police said that it is "adamantly opposed" to the bill.

== Personal life ==
Hurt is married to Dawn Hurt, and they have five children. He attends First Baptist Church in Halls.
