= Tami Sawyer =

American politician

Shelby County Commissioner, District 7
- Former
- In office September 1, 2018 – August 31, 2022
- Preceded by: Melvin Burgess
- Succeeded by: Henri E. Brooks

Personal details
- Born: April 27, 1982 (age 44) Evanston, IL
- Party: Democrat
- Education: University of Memphis

Tami Sawyer (born April 27, 1982) is an American politician and civil rights activist. She was elected in August 2018 as Shelby County Commissioner for District 7 and resides in Memphis, Tennessee. She is a member of the Democratic Party. She serves as chair of the Education and Legislative committees. She is chair of the Shelby County Commission Black Caucus. As of 2024, Sawyer is running for election as the Shelby County General Sessions Court Clerk.

Sawyer has provided commentary on social justice and public policy for many outlets including Al Jazeera, CNN, The Commercial Appeal, Essence Forbes, HuffPost, MLK50, MSNBC, NPR, Roland Martin, and Time. In 2020, We Can't Wait, a documentary chronicling her 2019 mayoral campaign, was named Best Home Towner Feature at the Indie Memphis Film Festival. Sawyer is featured in the award-winning 2022 documentary, Who We Are: A Chronicle of Racism in America with Jeffery Robinson.

Sawyer is a member of Alpha Kappa Alpha sorority and the Links, Inc., social organizations for Black women.

In June 2026, Sawyer was arrested. She faces six federal charges which include theft, fraud, and money laundering. The charges allege that Sawyer "embezzled, stole and knowingly $44,607.35 in public funds to her own use."

== Early life and education ==
Sawyer was born in Evanston, Illinois, to Gladys and Andrew Sawyer, Jr. She has one older brother, Michael. At the age of 8, her family relocated to South Holland, Illinois. When Sawyer was 12, her parents returned to her mother's home state, Tennessee. The Sawyer family resided in Mason, Tennessee, and she attended St. Mary's Episcopal School for middle school and high school. Upon graduation from high school in 2000, Sawyer attended Hampton University. She subsequently graduated from the University of Memphis in 2004 with a BA in Political Science. Sawyer then attended Howard University School of Law for two years before leaving to explore career opportunities. As of 2020, Sawyer is a graduate student at the University of Memphis seeking a master's degree in rhetorical communications.

== Career ==
From 2008 to 2014, Sawyer was a human capital analyst supporting diversity initiatives at NAVSEA PEO IWS, a program office of the United States Navy. During that time, she competed on the Food Network's Cupcake Wars and owned a small cupcake business, Tami Cakes.

Having lived in Washington, D.C. for a decade, she returned home to Memphis and led a team in teacher licensing for Shelby County Schools.

In 2015, Sawyer began a five-year tenure with Teach For America Memphis as the managing director, Diversity and Community Partnerships.

Following her employment with Teach for America, Sawyer held leadership positions with Black Voters Matter and Our Black Party.

Sawyer is co-chair of the Memphis NAACP Legal Defense Fund.

== Activism and #TakeEmDown901 ==
Following the trial of George Zimmerman for the killing of Trayvon Martin, and the domestic attack on the Washington Navy Yard in 2013, Sawyer became engaged in social justice and political activism. In 2014, she organized her first protest at the National Civil Rights Museum in the wake of the decision by a St. Louis grand jury not to try Darren Wilson for the killing of Michael Brown. Sawyer became known as a leader and voice of the burgeoning Black Lives Matter movement in Memphis.

Sawyer organized a vigil in December 2015 after a Cleveland prosecutor declined to charge the police officers who shot and killed Tamir Rice. The vigil was held in Health Sciences Park in front of the statue of Confederate General and Ku Klux Klan Grand Wizard, Nathan Bedford Forrest. Two years later, the City of Memphis removed both the Forrest statue and a statue of Jefferson Davis, president of the Confederacy, after responding to pressure from the #TakeEmDown901 movement which Sawyer formed and led.

After being elected to office in 2018, Sawyer continued her activism. She was a participant and organizer in the 2020 George Floyd protests in Memphis. In 2021, Sawyer was arrested outside of the White House with several other activists while protesting for an end to the filibuster and protection of voting rights.

== Political campaigns ==
- 2016 Tennessee State Representative, District 90
  - Sawyer lost the Democratic Primary to incumbent John DeBerry, Jr. DeBerry (56.67%) - Sawyer (43.37%).
- 2018 Shelby County Commissioner, District 7
  - Sawyer won the Democratic Primary with 50.3% over two opponents.
  - Sawyer defeated Republican Sam Goff in the general election. Sawyer (80.5%) - Goff (19.4%).
- 2019 Memphis Mayor
  - Sawyer was an unsuccessful challenger to incumbent Jim Strickland. She finished 3rd of 11 candidates and garnered 6.9% of the vote.
- Sawyer's term as Commissioner ended on August 31, 2022. She announced that she will not run for re-election but plans to begin a Ph.D. program in public policy.

== Controversy ==
In 2019, Sawyer was at the center of controversy when old tweets from the politician surfaced in which she communicated racist, anti-police, anti-disability, and anti-LGBTQ sentiments. In response community members created online petitions calling for Sawyer to be removed from the 2019 mayoral ballot. WMC Political Analyst Mike Nelson was quoted as saying “These are devastating revelations about someone who is a self-avowed progressive. These are the farthest things from progressive sentiments”.

Sawyer later apologized for several of the tweets, stating, “There are tweets that show a woman who, at that point, still hadn’t come to terms with her homophobia, who still wasn’t standing up and being a voice for all, regardless of ability. I am, not just deeply ashamed, but deeply sorry for those tweets, the harm they caused at the time, and the harm that seeing them now will still bring up, especially for members of those communities, and for all of us. … It is clear that I have not always been the person that I am today. I have said things in public platforms that are hurtful, offensive, and just wrong. As someone who works every day in the fight for justice, I am sorry I ever thought these things, said these things, and amplified these things. I am embarrassed by my past self and I am grateful to have had the space, the teachers, and the desire to grow beyond that version of me. To those my words and actions from my past hurt: I am sorry”.

== Awards and recognition ==
- Ebony Power 100 List 2018
- Memphis Business Journal Top 40 under 40 Class of 2018
- The Tennessean's 18 Tennesseans to Watch in 2018
- Reckon South's 2022 Reckon List
- Women of Achievement Heroism Award 2018
