= Richard Hackett =

American mayor

Richard C. Hackett

Mayor of Memphis
- In office December 21, 1982 – December 31, 1991
- Preceded by: Wallace Madewell
- Succeeded by: W. W. Herenton

Richard Cecil "Dick" Hackett (born July 21, 1949) served as the mayor of Memphis, Tennessee from 1982 to 1991. Prior to that he was the Shelby County (Tennessee) Clerk from 1978 to 1982. When he took office as mayor, he was 33 years old and was the youngest mayor of a major U.S. city. He is best known for his defeat in the historic 1991 election that saw the victory of the first African-American mayoral candidate in the city's history, W. W. Herenton.

Despite his incredibly narrow loss to Herenton (172 votes out of slightly over 248,000 cast), Hackett was a fairly popular mayor during his nine years in office. He ran and won three times, claiming victory in a 1982 special election as well as in the 1983 and 1987 general elections. His percentage of the vote increased each time, culminating in a lopsided victory in 1987 in which he garnered over 58% of the vote, including nearly 20% of the black vote. Despite this, by 1991 Hackett had become vulnerable due to changing demographics (because of continued white flight to the suburbs and an increasing black population, the city was nearly 55% African-American by 1991) as well as controversies during his second full term, including Holiday Inn's corporate headquarters leaving the city for Atlanta, serious problems with the Memphis Housing Authority and embarrassing issues involving the financing of the Pyramid Arena in downtown.

During Hackett's nine years as mayor, tourism, downtown redevelopment, business growth and non-profit institutional development were his main priorities. He was considered a fiscal conservative, with property taxes increasing only once while he was in office (in 1985) and the city's debt level remaining well under control. On the issue of race, Hackett was seen by many as a moderate, especially in comparison to his predecessors J. Wyeth Chandler (1972–82) and Henry Loeb (1968–71). He appointed many African-Americans as division directors, most notably James Ivey as police director and Greg Duckett as chief administrative officer.

After his 1991 defeat, Hackett worked for several non-profit agencies over the next 15 years. In July 2006, he became the CEO/director of the Children's Museum of Memphis.

Hackett's nephew is Relay podcast network co-founder Stephen M. Hackett.

Political offices
Preceded by Wallace Madewell	Mayor of Memphis, Tennessee; 1982 - 1991	Succeeded by W. W. Herenton
