= Joe Brown (judge) =

American judge (born 1947)

Judge Joe Brown
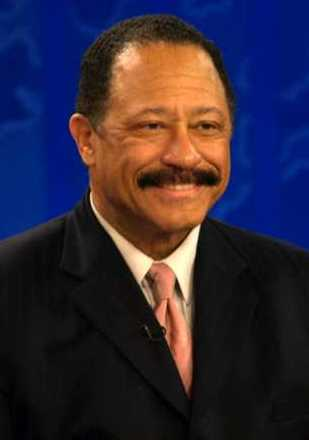
- Born: Joseph Blakeney Brown Jr. July 5, 1947 (age 79); Washington, D.C., U.S.
- Other name: Judge Joe Brown
- Education: University of California, Los Angeles (BA, JD)
- Occupations: Judge; lawyer; television personality
- Years active: 1978–present
- Spouse: Deborah Herron (m. 2001; div. 2017)
- Children: 2
- Website: jjbbbq.com

Joseph Blakeney Brown Jr. (born July 5, 1947), known professionally as Judge Joe Brown, is an American judge, former lawyer and television personality. He is a former Shelby County, Tennessee Criminal Court judge and a former arbiter of the arbitration-based reality court show Judge Joe Brown.

== Early life and education ==
Raised in the Crenshaw District of Los Angeles, Brown graduated as valedictorian from Dorsey High School. He earned a bachelor's degree in political science from the University of California, Los Angeles and a Juris Doctor from UCLA School of Law. While attending law school, Brown worked as a substitute teacher. He is a member of Alpha Phi Alpha fraternity.

Brown comes from a family of pioneers and activists. His grandfather on his father's side worked in Jackson, Tennessee with Alex Haley's grandfather as physician partners. His great-grandfather brought the Church of God in Christ (COGIC) to Kansas City in 1896. His grandmother on his mother's side was Choctaw and donated land to the historically black Lane College in Jackson, where his ancestors served as faculty and librarians.

His family history is marked by acts of defiance against racism and injustice. His grandfather and uncle murdered two deputy sheriffs for supposedly participating in the lynching of another uncle. His great-grandfather on his mother's side was a Yoruba chief who was kidnapped and brought to America illegally after the slave trade ended.

Brown has spoken about how his upbringing shaped his philosophy.

I grew up in one of the toughest neighborhoods in South Central Los Angeles. If you saw the movie Boyz n the Hood, that was the way I grew up. I watched my parents tough it out on a daily basis, and I saw that what really kept them going was making a difference to others.

== Career ==
After graduating from law school, Brown moved to Memphis, Tennessee to work as an attorney for the Legal Services Corporation. Brown later worked for the Equal Employment Opportunity Commission. By 1978, Brown became the first African-American prosecutor in Memphis, and he later directed the Memphis public defender's office. He would later open his own law practice before being elected as a judge on the State Criminal Court of Shelby County, Tennessee in 1990. While on the bench he was known for his sometimes unusual sentences, such as sentencing a child molester to confess to his church congregation and ordering a drug trafficker to apologize in a newspaper letter.

Brown was thrust into the national spotlight while presiding over James Earl Ray's last appeal of his conviction for the assassination of Martin Luther King Jr. Brown was removed from the reopened investigation of King's murder due to alleged bias. It was during this time that Brown caught the attention of the producers of Judge Judy.

In March 2014, Brown won the Democratic primary for the position of Shelby County district attorney. He lost the general election to Republican incumbent Amy Weirich by 65% to 35%, after making comments about her sexuality.

Brown asserted that Weirich's "husband moved out and took the kids," and that "she needs to come out of the closet." Weirich responded: "It's a sad day that someone that out of touch with reality considers himself a viable candidate for one of the important positions in Shelby County."

In August 2015, Brown served five days in the Shelby County Jail after having been held in contempt of court in March 2014. Brown apparently raised his voice and interrupted a magistrate judge while representing a woman seeking child support in Shelby County Juvenile Court. Brown claimed that the sentence was excessive, and that he should have only been fined; Harold Horne, the Shelby County Juvenile Court chief magistrate that found Brown in contempt, responded that "This is not Hollywood. This is the real thing and as an officer of the court he should have known better."

Responding to a bar discipline complaint filed regarding the contempt incident, Brown declared himself unable to adequately defend himself as a result of health issues, including type II diabetes, hypertension, and stress. His law license was entered on the disability inactive list (suspending his ability to practice law in Tennessee), and the discipline case was placed on indefinite hold until such a time as Brown is healthy enough to face the complaint.

Brown was an Independent candidate for the 2023 Memphis mayoral election. He finished 7th.

== Personal life ==
Brown is twice divorced and has two sons from his first marriage.

=== Legal issues ===
In March 2014, Brown was arrested in Memphis, Tennessee, and charged with five counts of contempt of court and getting "verbally abusive" during a child support case overseen by Magistrate Harold Horne. Brown, who retains his law license, was reviewing a child support matter as a favor to an acquaintance.

According to press accounts, Brown became combative and irate after Horne refused to discuss details of the case that were not on the schedule. Brown was sentenced to five days in jail, but was later released on his own recognizance. Brown surrendered to the Shelby County Sheriff on August 27, 2015, to serve his five-day sentence at the Shelby County Corrections Facility in Memphis. In audio obtained by WREG and an available transcript on eonline.com, Brown can be heard arguing that the judge didn't have the authority to sit on the bench.

"Excuse me, on what authority do you sit by the way? As a former judge here, we have a rule in the 30th Judicial District—it says every single Magistrate Referee has to be unanimously approved by every Circuit, Chancery, and Criminal Court Judge. I don't recall that your name's ever been submitted, sir. This tribunal on a General Sessions Court's authority is insufficient to establish you. Therefore, I challenge your authority to hear it. And by the way, what is that, Magistrate, sir, with due respect." Brown then said, "OK, OK, I'll tell you what. I'll be out of here very shortly on a Petition for Habeas Corpus and I'll bring up all these problems and guess what, you might not be operating tomorrow."

Brown was warned that he would be held in contempt before these comments. Judge Horne began increasing the quantity of days Brown could be held in contempt after Brown continued disrupting the court. Judge Brown's lawyer filed an appeal, but the appeal was refused. He was released from protective custody at the Shelby County Corrections Facility the morning of September 1, 2015. After his release, he compared himself to notable civil rights activists who spent significant time imprisoned for their activism like Martin Luther King Jr., Nelson Mandela, and Stokely Carmichael. Some in the community took offense to this assertion since the incident took place during Brown's Shelby County district attorney campaign and Brown brought his own lawyer with him during the 2014 incident, causing many to wonder if it was a ploy for publicity.
