= Watkins Overton =

American politician (1894–1958)

S. Watkins Overton Jr.

Mayor of Memphis
- In office 1949 – March 1, 1953
- Preceded by: James J. Pleasants Jr.
- Succeeded by: Frank T. Tobey
- In office 1928–1939
- Preceded by: Rowlett Paine
- Succeeded by: Edward H. Crump

Personal details
- Born: June 5, 1894 Memphis, Tennessee, U.S.
- Died: December 2, 1958 (aged 64) Memphis, Tennessee, U.S.

Samuel Watkins Overton Jr. (June 5, 1894 – December 2, 1958) was an American politician and the longest-serving mayor in the history of Memphis, Tennessee.

== Early life ==
Samuel Watkins Overton Jr. was born in Memphis on June 5, 1894, to Samuel Watkins Overton Sr. and Mary Hill Overton. Watkins Overton Jr. was also the great-great-grandson of Judge John Overton, the founder of Memphis; his grandfather John Overton III also served as Mayor of Memphis from 1881 to 1883. Watkins Overton Jr. graduated with his AB degree from Carroll College in Waukesha, Wisconsin. During World War I, he served with the Ambulance Corps of AEF. He earned his J.D. from the University of Chicago in 1921. He was a member of Tau Kappa Epsilon, Phi Delta Phi, Omicron Delta Kappa, and Order of the Coif. After completing law school, Overton entered the practice of law in Memphis.

== Political career ==
When Watkins Overton ran for Mayor of Memphis in 1927, aided by the E. H. Crump political machine,. construction of an airport was a major focus of his mayoral campaign. Overton quickly appointed an airport planning commission after his election, and on June 15, 1929, the Memphis Municipal Airport (later renamed Memphis International Airport) opened for business.

The city was also in debt to the amount of $900,000 when he took control of the city in 1928. During the depression, Overton managed to erase the debt and accumulate a $1 million surplus. He also successfully lobbied for federally funded projects through the WPA and PWA.

His second term ended in acrimony: disgusted by the City Commission, he resigned on March 1, 1953.

Watkins Overton died on December 2, 1958, in Memphis.
