= Paul Young (American politician) =

Mayor of Memphis, Tennessee since 2024 (born 1979)

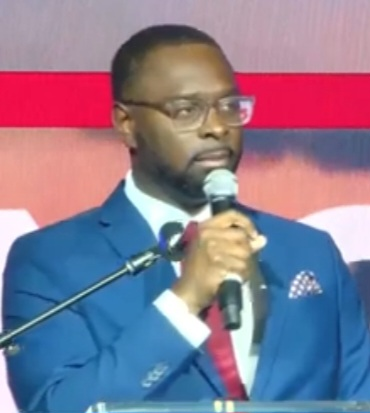

65th Mayor of Memphis
- Incumbent
- Assumed office January 1, 2024
- Preceded by: Jim Strickland

Personal details
- Born: Paul Andrew Young; October 7, 1979 (age 47) Memphis, Tennessee, U.S.
- Party: Democratic
- Education: University of Tennessee (BS); University of Memphis (MS, MBA)

Paul Andrew Young (born October 7, 1979) is an American politician and businessman who is the 65th and current mayor of Memphis, Tennessee. He has served since January 1, 2024.

== Early life and education ==
Young was born on October 7, 1979, to Dr. William Young, a Vietnam War veteran, and Rev. Diane Young. He grew up in the Oakhaven neighborhood of Memphis. His father became the chaplain of Methodist Hospital when Paul was two years of age, the first African-American to do so. William Young also founded a church in Bolivar, Tennessee, when Paul was seven. Diane and William founded the Healing Center Full Gospel Baptist Church in Oakhaven when Paul was 11. Paul's parents were surrogate parents for many children while Paul was growing up. Paul attended East High School in Memphis. He earned a degree in Electrical Engineering from the University of Tennessee. He decided to pursue a master's degree in city and regional planning after hearing a sermon from his mother. He also has a degree in business administration. In 2009, Young was named a mid-career fellow by the nonprofit New Memphis.

== Pre-mayoral career ==
Young was president and CEO of the Downtown Memphis Commission, during COVID-19. As CEO of the DMC, he stated the need for a grocery store in the downtown area, and one year later the opening of the South Point grocery store was announced.

== Mayoral campaign ==
Young's 2023 mayoral campaign focused on strengthening the Memphis economy and creating more jobs. His platform included proposals for technology and development. Young's platform addressed systemic issues such as poverty and crime, with a focus on neighborhood safety and expanding opportunities.

=== Campaign strategy ===
Young's campaign used a multi-step strategy to engage voters. The campaign worked with VoteShift, a firm specializing in strategies for candidates focused on racial equity. Content was shared across various platforms, including YouTube and story ads. In a Reddit AMA on October 3, 2023, Young engaged with Memphians and answered questions about the future of Memphis. During the AMA, Reddit users asked for his views on Memphis's current state, particularly from his perspective as a resident.

=== Election results ===
In the 2023 Memphis mayoral election, Paul Young received 24,408 votes from 98 precincts, 4,500 more than his nearest competitor, Floyd Bonner Jr. The second closest competitor was Willie Herenton, a former Memphis mayor. The vote was split among 17 candidates on the ballot. This was the first election since 1971 where an incumbent was not seeking re-election. A total of 88,699 votes were cast, representing 23.8% of registered voters.

== Mayor of Memphis ==
Young was elected mayor of Memphis in the 2023 Memphis mayoral election. He was sworn in on January 1, 2024.

=== Public safety ===
During his mayoral bid, Paul Young promised a "pandemic like response" to crime, which he described as engaging multiple stakeholders such as police, the district attorney, judges, and community organizers. Since his election, Young has focused on public safety through initiatives such as Operation Code Zero. Operation Code Zero was introduced to reduce crime by increasing police presence in high-crime and high-traffic tourist areas. Young is also overseeing the installation of $10–15 million worth of AI-powered cameras across Memphis to address concerns over crime and shootings.

In September 2025, after U.S. President Donald Trump publicly announced his intention to deploy U.S. federal troops to Memphis for alleged public safety reasons, Young was quick to speak out against this planned deployment, however Young said he planned to make the most out of the deployment.

=== Transportation and infrastructure ===
Young replaced the entire MATA (Memphis Area Transit Authority) board. This followed a period of significant financial deficits in the system. Public approval of MATA declined from 75% in 2018 to 38% in more recent years. A large portion of buses required engine repairs. Young ordered a forensic audit of MATA's finances to identify inefficiencies and areas of unnecessary spending.

=== Fiscal responsibility ===
Young implemented several tax increases aimed at improving city services and infrastructure, including a 49-cent property tax hike, a $30 increase in vehicle registrations, and a $12 increase on solid waste fees. The administration created public dashboards, including one from the Memphis Police Department, that tracks data points like homicide rates. The administration aims to create a system that addresses the current needs of the city while preparing for future growth.

=== Economic development and housing ===
Young's administration supported financial incentives to encourage investment in affordable housing. Young has also committed to increasing funding for the Affordable Housing Trust Fund.

Additionally, Young's transition team recommended establishing a small business support network to help accelerate the growth of businesses. In August 2024, Paul Young and police Chief C.J. Davis announced $3 million to compensate businesses recovering from crime.

== Personal life ==
Paul is married to Jamila Smith-Young. Jamila is a nurse practitioner and assistant professor at University of Tennessee Health Science Center. Paul and Jamila have two children, aged 12 and eight. Paul has two siblings, Dorcas Young Griffin, an older sister, and Rev. David Young. Dorcas is the Shelby County Government Deputy Chief Administrative Officer. Rev. David Young is a pastor. Paul has two half siblings. His half-brother William Jr. has struggled with homelessness, despite his family's efforts. Paul's father William died of congestive heart failure at the age of 77 on October 5, 2022, five days after Paul launched his mayoral campaign.

Young is a fan of hip-hop. He is a member of Kappa Alpha Psi.

== Kidnapping attempt ==
In June 2025, Young was targeted in a kidnapping attempt. The suspected perpetrator Trenton Abston was arrested after scaling the wall of Young's neighborhood. After being taken into custody, Abston, who carried out the attempted kidnapping soon after an incident took place which involved targeting public officials in Minnesota, was found to have a TASER, gloves, rope and duct tape in his vehicle. In addition to Young, Abston also had a list of several other leaders' names, as well as the names of their spouses and children.

In May 2026, Abston was federally indicted for the kidnapping attempt.

Political offices
Preceded by Jim Strickland	Mayor of Memphis; 2024–present	Incumbent
