= Craig Fitzhugh =

American politician (born 1950)

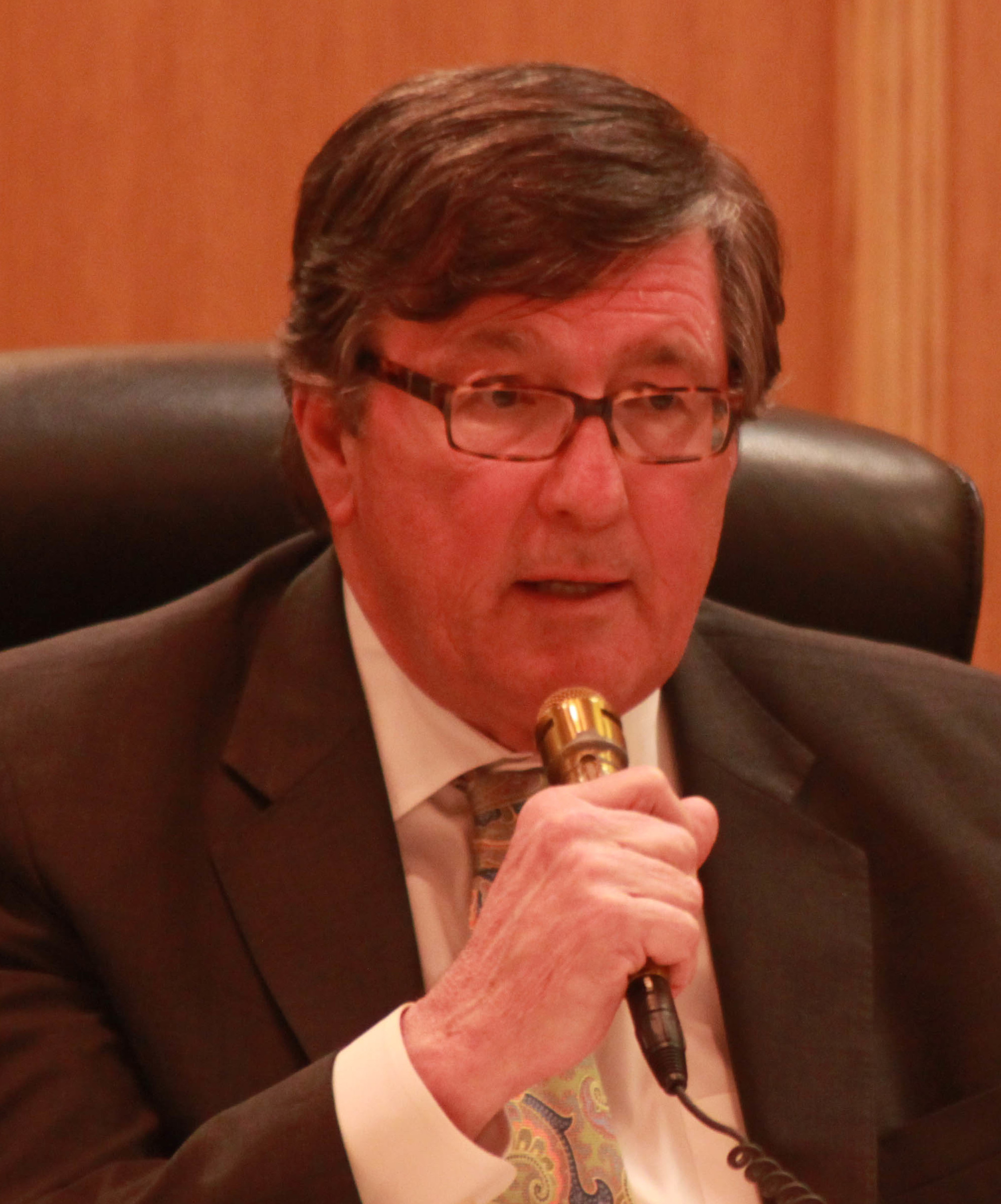
- Fitzhugh in 2014

Minority Leader of the Tennessee House of Representatives
- In office January 11, 2011 – January 8, 2019
- Preceded by: Gary Odom
- Succeeded by: Karen Camper

Member of the Tennessee House of Representatives from the 82nd district
- In office January 1, 1995 – January 8, 2019
- Preceded by: Floyd Crain
- Succeeded by: Chris Hurt

Mayor of Ripley
- Incumbent
- Assumed office August 6, 2020
- Preceded by: Jon Pavletic

Personal details
- Born: March 22, 1950 (age 76) Brownsville, Tennessee, U.S.
- Party: Democratic
- Spouse: Pamela Fitzhugh
- Children: 2 children
- Education: University of Tennessee (BS, JD)
- Website: Official website

Military service
- Allegiance: United States
- Branch/service: United States Air Force
- Years of service: 1976–1980 (Active); 1980–1988 (Reserve)
- Rank: Captain (Active); Major (Reserve)
- Unit: U.S. Air Force Reserve

Calvin "Craig" Fitzhugh (born March 22, 1950) is an American politician. He was a member of the Tennessee House of Representatives, representing the 82nd District, which, when he represented it, encompassed all of Crockett, Haywood and Lauderdale counties. He is a member of the Democratic Party and served as the House Minority Leader until January 2019.

== Biography ==
Fitzhugh was born in Brownsville, Tennessee, in 1950 and raised in Ripley, Tennessee. He graduated from Ripley High School in 1968, where he played varsity baseball, football, and basketball. He graduated from the University of Tennessee in 1972 with a bachelor's degree in Banking and Finance. While at UT, he was a member of the Phi Gamma Delta fraternity and played centerfield on the UT Freshman Baseball Team.

Fitzhugh graduated from law school at UT in 1975. He served four years active duty in the Air Force as a captain in the Judge's Advocate General Corp., serving at bases in North Carolina and England. In 1980, Fitzhugh returned to practice law in Ripley where he worked until joining the Bank of Ripley in 1992. He currently serves as the Bank of Ripley's CEO.

Fitzhugh has been married to Pam Chism for 45 years. They have two children and five grandchildren.

Fitzhugh is active in the Tennessee Banker's Association, where he previously served as chairman of the statewide organization. He also remains active in the legal community where he was formerly a member of the Tennessee Board of Professional Responsibility. Recently, Fitzhugh was inducted as a Fellow of the Tennessee Bar Foundation.

An Eagle Scout, Fitzhugh has been an assistant scoutmaster since 1981. He was awarded the Silver Beaver Award and is a Brotherhood Order of the Arrow member and has completed Woodbadge training.

Fitzhugh is a 30+year Life Sponsor of Ducks Unlimited and a former District and Zone Chairman. He was a fourth generation member of First Baptist Church in Ripley, where he served as a Deacon.

In 2010, he was a finalist for the presidency of the University of Tennessee.

== Education ==
Fitzhugh graduated from Ripley High School in 1968. He then attended the University of Tennessee where he received a B.S. in Banking and Finance in 1972. He received a Juris Doctor (J.D.) in 1975 from the University of Tennessee School of Law.

== Political career ==
Fitzhugh was a municipal judge for the City of Gates, Tennessee, from 1990 to 1992. Fitzhugh was first elected to the Tennessee House in 1994, taking office in 1995. He served in that position until 2019, representing the 82nd District. Fitzhugh was elected by the Democratic caucus to serve as House Minority Leader in December 2010 and prior to that served as the chairman of the House Finance, Ways and Means Committee.

Fitzhugh declined to run for Governor of Tennessee in the 2014 gubernatorial election. He ran unsuccessfully for governor in 2018, losing to former Nashville mayor Karl Dean in the primary on August 2, 2018.

Fitzhugh currently serves as the mayor of Ripley, Tennessee. He ran for mayor in 2020, defeating then-incumbent mayor, Jon Pavletic, with 57.61% of the town's vote.

== Legislation ==
On June 4, 2007, Fitzhugh voted in favor for SB 2326 which increased the Cigarette Tax from 20 cents to 60 cents per pack. It passed the Tennessee House of Representatives 59–37. He sponsored and passed the largest tax reduction in the State's history in the reduction of the sales tax on food. He was instrumental in passage of the Complete College Act, led the fight for expansion of Medicaid and the rejection of vouchers for Tennessee schools.

Following the 2012 meningitis related death of a local university student, Fitzhugh & State Senator Lowe Finney filed the 'Jacob Nunnely Act' which required students living in on-campus housing to be immunized against the disease. The bill passed and was signed into law by Gov. Bill Haslam on June 4, 2013.

Tennessee was previously one of 31 states that allowed a rapist, whose crime resulted in pregnancy, to sue the survivor for custody of said child. In 2015, Fitzhugh introduced HB 554/SB 1121 which sought to terminate the parental rights of a rapist upon conviction for that crime from which a child resulted. The bill passed both the House and Senate unanimously. It was signed into law by Gov. Bill Haslam on April 16, 2015.

== Military service ==
Fitzhugh served as a Judge Advocate General in the United States Air Force from 1976 to 1980 and achieved the rank of captain. He also served in the United States Air Force Reserve from 1980 to 1988 and achieved the rank of major.

== Electoral history ==
Tennessee House of Representatives Election 2016
Party	Candidate	Votes	%	±%
Republican	Andy Cole	8,213	44.04	
Democratic	Craig Fitzhugh	10,437	55.96	

Tennessee House of Representatives Election 2014
Party	Candidate	Votes	%	±%
Republican	No Candidate			
Democratic	Craig Fitzhugh	7,830	100	

Tennessee House of Representatives Election 2012
Party	Candidate	Votes	%	±%
Republican	Johnny Edwards	8,172	39.97	
Democratic	Craig Fitzhugh	12,273	60.03	

Tennessee House of Representatives Election 2010
Party	Candidate	Votes	%	±%
Republican	Johnny Edwards	6,680	48.95	
Democratic	Craig Fitzhugh	6,964	51.05	

Tennessee House of Representatives Election 2008
Party	Candidate	Votes	%	±%
Republican	No Candidate			
Democratic	Craig Fitzhugh	13,088	100	

Tennessee House of Representatives Election 2006
Party	Candidate	Votes	%	±%
Republican	No Candidate			
Democratic	Craig Fitzhugh	12,098	100	

Tennessee House of Representatives Election 2004
Party	Candidate	Votes	%	±%
Republican	Dave Dahl	7,693	38.79	
Democratic	Craig Fitzhugh	12,140	61.21	

Tennessee House of Representatives Election 2002
Party	Candidate	Votes	%	±%
Republican	Dave Dahl	6,003	39.45	
Democratic	Craig Fitzhugh	8,901	58.49	
Independent	Richard Rhoads	312	2.05	

Tennessee House of Representatives
Preceded by Gary Odom	Minority Leader of the Tennessee House of Representatives; 2011–2019	Succeeded by Karen Camper
