= Myron Lowery =

American politician and news anchor (1946–2025)

62nd Mayor of Memphis
- In office July 31, 2009 – October 26, 2009
- Preceded by: W. W. Herenton
- Succeeded by: A C Wharton

Personal details
- Born: December 26, 1946 Columbus, Ohio, U.S.
- Died: September 27, 2025 (aged 78)
- Education: LeMoyne-Owen College (BS); New York University (MS); University of Tennessee (MS)
- Profession: News anchor; politician

Myron Lowery (December 26, 1946 – September 27, 2025) was an American politician who served as the mayor pro tempore of Memphis, Tennessee, from July 31, 2009, to October 26, 2009. He was a television news anchor for WMC-TV 5 in Memphis. Lowery served on the Memphis City Council from 1991. He became interim mayor on July 31, 2009, following the retirement of Mayor W. W. Herenton. He ran for Mayor of Memphis in a special election held on October 15, 2009, losing to A C Wharton.

Lowery's tenure as Mayor Pro Tem was marked by attempts to remove officials from Herenton's controversial prior administration and efforts at transparency in government.

== Life and career ==
Lowery was born in Columbus, Ohio on December 26, 1946. At different times, Lowery served as a board member of the Tennessee Municipal League, Tennessee Quality, Goals for Memphis, Leadership Memphis, Goodwill Boys Club, The Memphis Zoo, the Headstart Policy Council, and the Board of Trustees of LeMoyne-Owen College.

On the national front, Lowery was a member of the Board of Directors for National League of Cities. He served as Vice-President of the National Association of Black Journalists and as Secretary, Treasurer, Vice-Chairman and Chairman of the Democratic Municipal Officials. In 1996, he was a speaker at the Democratic National Convention. Lowery served as a member of the Democratic National Committee and was a member of the National Black Caucus of Local Elected Officials. He was also a past treasurer of the United Negro College Fund's National Alumni Council.

Lowery held a Bachelor of Science in Sociology from LeMoyne-Owen College, a Master of Science in Education from New York University and a Master of Science in Urban Education from the University of Tennessee. He also held an honorary degree from Southeastern College of Technology.

In September 2009, Lowery greeted visiting Tibetan Buddhist leader, the Dalai Lama, with a fist bump, which garnered brief national news coverage. Lowery reportedly pre-arranged the greeting with the leader's handlers.

In July 2015, Lowery moved to unearth the remains of Civil War general and Ku Klux Klan's first Grand Wizard Nathan Bedford Forest and his wife and have his memorial removed because: "It is no longer politically correct to glorify someone who was a slave trader, someone who was a racist, on public property."

Lowery died at the age of 78 on September 27, 2025.

== Sources ==
- Fox News Councilmember takes first step to remove Nathan Bedford Forrest statue from a city park
- Zack McMillin, Myron Lowery takes long path to top job; Council leader to serve as mayor until election, Memphis Commercial Appeal, June 26, 2009
- Myron Lowery files petition to run for Memphis mayor, Memphis Commercial Appeal, August 26, 2009
- Council Super District 8
- Associated Press, Dalai Lama comes to Memphis, gets fist bump, joke, September 23, 2009; retrieved from WISH-TV website on October 27, 2009

Political offices
Preceded by Willie Herenton	Mayor of Memphis, Tennessee; 2009 (pro tem)	Succeeded by A C Wharton
