= A C Wharton =

American educator, politician, and attorney

A C Wharton Jr.
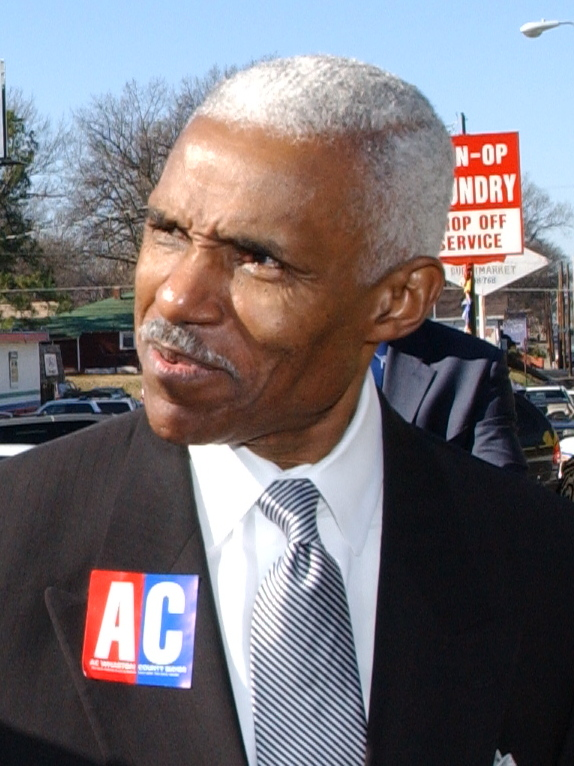
- Wharton in 2002

63rd Mayor of Memphis
- In office October 26, 2009 – December 31, 2015
- Preceded by: Willie Herenton; Myron Lowery (pro tem)
- Succeeded by: Jim Strickland

Personal details
- Born: August 17, 1944 (age 82) Lebanon, Tennessee, U.S.
- Party: Democratic
- Spouse: Ruby Wharton
- Education: Tennessee State University (BA); University of Mississippi (JD)
- Website: ACwharton.com

A C Wharton Jr. (born August 17, 1944) is an American educator, politician, and attorney who served as the 63rd mayor of Memphis, Tennessee and previously mayor of Shelby County. He was the second African American to serve as mayor of Shelby County.

== Early life, education, and early career ==
A C Wharton was born and raised in Lebanon, Tennessee. A C Wharton shares his name with his father and grandfather, and named his eldest son by the same name. Wharton has stated that his first name is simply the letters "A" and "C" and does not stand for anything else.

He graduated from Tennessee State University with a degree in political science and earned a J.D. degree from the University of Mississippi. He became an academic, teaching at the university for 25 years.

In 1980, then-Shelby County Mayor Bill Morris appointed Wharton as Chief Shelby County Public Defender. His concern for the mentally ill in the criminal justice system resulted in the Jericho Initiative, which became a national model program. He chaired the county's Jail Overcrowding Committee and developed new ways to reduce overcrowding without compromising public safety.

== Shelby County Mayor ==
In 2002 Wharton was elected as the first African-American mayor of Shelby County. He became a member of the Mayors Against Illegal Guns Coalition, a group with the stated goal of "making the public safer by getting illegal guns off the streets." Wharton initiated Operation Safe Community. In addition, he developed a program to help prisoners develop the skills to succeed in life and to support their families. He increased funding for the drug court. He is credited with working to toughen gun laws and seeking passage of laws that make criminals pay into a special program to help victims.

Wharton improved the management and accountability of the county's Head Start program. His reforms attracted the attention of the United States Congress, where he was called to testify before the House Committee on Education, with many of his subsequent recommendations being incorporated as changes to public policy. He was a strong advocate "Books from Birth," a unique early-childhood education program which provides books for over 28,000 children in Memphis and Shelby County every year.

Between 2008 and 2009, Wharton convened and led the community-wide effort which led to the drafting of Sustainable Shelby, an environmentally sustainable agenda for the county.

== Memphis mayor ==
=== Election ===
In June 2009, Wharton announced his intentions to run for mayor of Memphis in a special election to replace Mayor Willie Herenton, who vacated the office soon after being elected to his fifth term in order to run again for superintendent of the city school board. Wharton won the election in a landslide, receiving 60 percent of the vote in a field of twenty-five candidates.

Wharton was sworn into office on October 26, 2009. He was the fourth African American to serve as Mayor of Memphis (previous African-American mayors were J. O. Patterson Jr., W. W. Herenton, and Myron Lowery). He was the second African American (after Herenton) to be elected to that office. He was re-elected in 2011, winning 65 percent of the vote.

=== Tenure ===
In 2010, Wharton pledged to build over 50 miles of bicycle lanes and associated facilities in Memphis. Memphis had been ranked as one of America's worst cities for cycling by Bicycling magazine in 2008. The Memphis Greenline was completed and bike lanes were designated throughout the city. There are plans for further expansion with the aid of a $15 million federal grant. In 2010 Wharton hired the city's first Bicycle and Pedestrian Coordinator.

He created the city's Office of Talent and Capital in 2010 in an effort to promote employment in the city.

In September 2013, a U.S. Chamber of Commerce Foundation report recognized Memphis as a paradigm for a government focused on job creation, crime reduction, and economic growth. The Chamber cited development strategies created by Wharton's "Innovation Delivery Team" in praising Memphis.

Wharton has been criticized for awarding contracts to his friends, underfunding Memphis City Schools, underfunding the Memphis Police Department and for cutting services for young people and the elderly, while offering incentive packages to corporate interests. He has reiterated his commitment to economic development and job creation, to benefit all citizens.

Wharton publicly disagreed with the 2010 Forbes ranking of Memphis as the Most Miserable City in America. By 2013, four years into Wharton's tenure as mayor, Memphis no longer appeared on that Forbes list of miserable cities in any rank.

On June 17, 2014, the Memphis City Council passed Wharton's budget "that includes Mayor A C Wharton's plan to cut retiree and current employee health benefits". Under Wharton's budget, all current city employees and retirees (under the age of 65) (including Police and Fire) would have to pay 24% in increased health insurance premiums. City Retirees over the age of 65 now have to pay 100% of their health insurance premiums.

In 2015, Wharton lost re-election to former city councilman Jim Strickland, winning 22 percent of the vote to Strickland's 41 percent.

=== Lawsuits ===
In 2010, the United States Environmental Protection Agency and the Tennessee Department of Environment and Conservation filed a joint federal lawsuit against the city administration for violating the Clean Water Act and the state Water Quality Control Act.

In 2011 on a different issue, city employees filed a federal class action suit against the Wharton administration, claiming that his budget and relations with the city union violated city employees' First Amendment and the Fourteenth Amendment rights.

== Personal life ==
Wharton lives in the Glenview neighborhood of Memphis with his wife, Ruby, an attorney. The couple has three sons together and raised three other boys. The Whartons also have seven grandchildren.

Political offices
Preceded by Myron Lowery	Mayor of Memphis, Tennessee; 2009 – 2015	Succeeded by Jim Strickland
