= Jim Strickland (politician) =

American politician

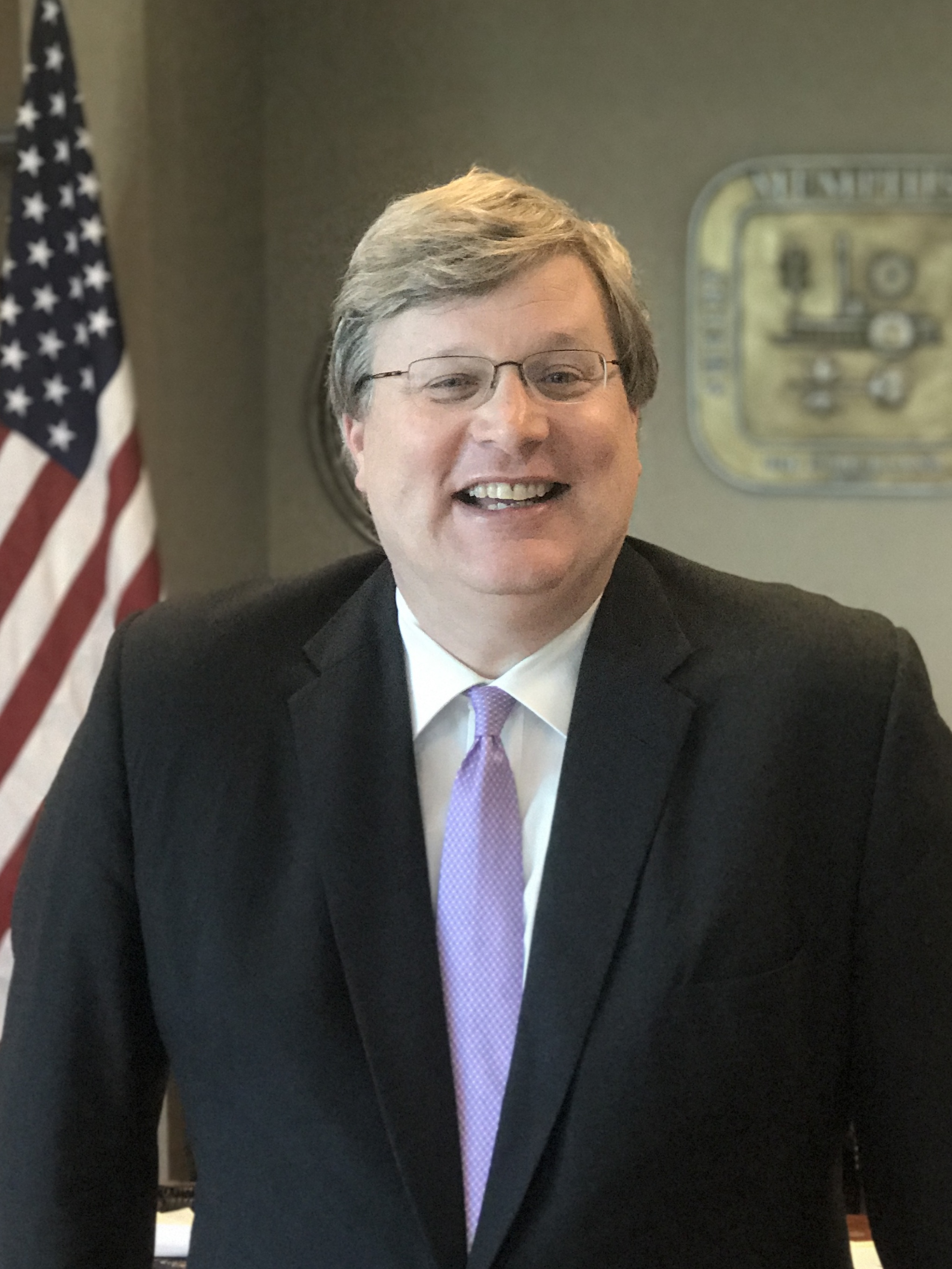

64th Mayor of Memphis
- In office January 1, 2016 – January 1, 2024
- Preceded by: A C Wharton
- Succeeded by: Paul Young

Member of the Memphis City Council from the 5th district
- In office January 2008 – January 2016
- Preceded by: Carol Chumney
- Succeeded by: Worth Morgan

Personal details
- Born: James Steven Strickland Jr. October 22, 1963 (age 62) Mishawaka, Indiana, U.S.
- Party: Democratic
- Spouse: Melyne Strickland
- Children: 2
- Education: University of Memphis (BA, JD)

James Steven Strickland Jr. (born October 22, 1963) is an American attorney and politician who served as the 64th mayor of Memphis, Tennessee between 2016 and 2024. A member of the Democratic Party, he previously served as a member of the Memphis City Council. Strickland is also the dean of the University of Memphis Cecil C. Humphreys School of Law.

== Early life, education, and early career ==
Strickland was born on October 22, 1963, in Mishawaka, Indiana. His family moved to Memphis, Tennessee, and he graduated from Christian Brothers High School in 1982. He received a bachelor's degree and Juris Doctor from the University of Memphis in 1989.

In 1998, Strickland opened a law firm with one of his classmates at the University of Memphis, David Kustoff, who now represents much of Memphis' eastern portion in Congress. Strickland's professional experience also includes working in the law firm of Glankler Brown, PLLC from 1990 to 1998, clerking for Justice William H. D. Fones of the Tennessee Supreme Court, and working as an adjunct law professor at the University of Memphis.

== Memphis City Council ==
After being first elected to the City Council in October 2007, Strickland was re-elected in October 2011. In 2013, he was elected to serve as Vice Chairman and was the Chairman of the Council for 2014.

== Mayor of Memphis ==
=== 2015 election ===
On January 15, 2015, Jim Strickland announced his plan to run for mayor. Throughout his campaign, Strickland focused on crime, poverty, and blight throughout Memphis.

Strickland was elected mayor on October 8, 2015, with 42% of the city's vote, beating incumbent Mayor A C Wharton who received 22% of the vote. The election was an uncommon victory over an incumbent, with the last case being in 1991. Strickland's win marked the first time since 1972 that a council member took the office of mayor.

Strickland was Memphis' first white mayor in 24 years. In Otis Sanford's book Boss Crump to King Willie: How Race Changed Memphis Politics, he notes that "Strickland also made history by receiving more of a percentage of the black vote than any winning white candidate since William B. Ingram in 1963."

=== Tenure ===
Mayor Strickland entered office with several preceding problems: the threat of forced de-annexation for the Tennessee General Assembly, millions in unknown financial obligations, and the looming risk of losing the city's fourth-largest public company, ServiceMaster.

Strickland overcame early challenges by effectively dodging the threat of de-annexation which would have potentially lost 111,000 residents and somewhere between $27 million and $80 million in tax revenue for the city of Memphis. He passed the first city budget in a unanimous and "unheard-of seven-minute" vote. The second budget passed by Strickland included a $5.9 million increase for the Memphis Police Department for recruitment and an additional $6 million for officer overtime. Strickland also budgeted for the expansion of public libraries which included the reopening of 10 branches. Another $2 million was dedicated to street paving, bringing the overall total to $18.5 million, almost double that spent on streets in the 2014-15 fiscal year. Mayor Strickland was also able to retain ServiceMaster by relocating the company to Downtown Memphis, which marked a major victory for the city, saving 1,200 jobs and $100 million in payroll. Mary Kay Wegner who was in charge of the company's search for a new headquarters called Strickland "one of the chief influencers" on their decision to stay in Memphis.

Strickland placed a focus on contracts going to minority and female contractors. The percentage as of April 2017 is 21.1%. The change is a 68% increase from January 2016 when Strickland entered office. These efforts made up part of a larger plan to reduce contract disparity and approach city government in terms of data. The city of Memphis began to collect data and set monthly goals in order to target other specific issues, such as successfully reducing 911 response times, which were reduced from over a minute wait time in 2015 to 14 seconds in 2016.

Due to the expansion of companies such as ServiceMaster and non-profits such as St. Jude Children's Hospital, there is an estimated $7 billion in current and future developments for the city of Memphis.

In response to the death of Tyre Nichols, Strickland said in a statement that he was "sad and angry" for the family of Nichols and the Memphis Police Department. He also indicated that the SCORPION unit, which the five officers who were charged with murder in Nichols' death had been members of, had been inactive since an internal investigation was started following Nichols' death. Strickland had previously praised the SCORPION unit for its multiple arrests and asset seizures in an address to the city in January 2022.

=== 2019 election ===
In January 2019, Strickland announced his intention to run for a second term. He was challenged by former mayor W.W. Herenton and Shelby County Commissioner Tami Sawyer. Strickland won re-election to a second term, garnering 62% of the votes cast for Mayor in one of the lowest turnout elections since the current Mayor/Council form of government was approved in 1966.

== Personal life ==
Strickland and his wife, Melyne, have two children. His son Brian Strickland is a television writer and producer for The Masked Singer.

== See also ==
- List of mayors of Memphis, Tennessee

Political offices
Preceded by A C Wharton	Mayor of Memphis; 2016–2024	Succeeded by Paul Young
