= Carol Chumney =

American politician (born 1961)

Member of the Memphis City Council from the 5th district
- In office 2004–2008
- Preceded by: John Vergos
- Succeeded by: Jim Strickland

Member of the Tennessee House of Representatives from the 89th district
- In office January 8, 1991 – October 20, 2003
- Preceded by: Pamela Gaia
- Succeeded by: Beverly Marrero

Personal details
- Born: Carolyn Jean Chumney; February 13, 1961 (age 65) San Antonio, Texas, U.S.
- Party: Democratic
- Education: University of Memphis
- Occupation: Lawyer

Carolyn Jean Chumney (born February 13, 1961) is an American lawyer and politician from the U.S. state of Tennessee. She served in the Tennessee House of Representatives from 1991 to 2003. She represented the fifth district (East Memphis and Midtown) on the Memphis, Tennessee City Council from 2004 to 2007. Chumney came in second place in the Democratic primary for Shelby County mayor in 2002, and within 7 points of being elected the first woman Memphis mayor in 2007. Chumney was a leading attorney taking the fight for election security to the U.S. Supreme Court and Congress. She is also the author of "The Arena: One Woman's Story" [Lady Justice Publishing 2021], which has gained national recognition, including First Place At-Large Autobiography, by the National Federation of Press Women. Chumney is now an elected Shelby County Circuit Court Judge (Memphis metropolitan area) and took office on September 1, 2022, after winning the countywide election.

== Biography ==
She attended school at:

- Shady Grove School
- White Station High School
- The University of Memphis

As a Presidential Scholar, she earned her B.A. in economics and history with honors, magna cum laude, and was student government president (1982–83).

Chumney earned her Juris Doctor from the University of Memphis Law School in 1986, as a Herff Law Scholar. During law school she was the editor-in-chief of the law review.

As a trial attorney, Chumney began her private practice in 1987, at Glankler Brown law firm, where she later became a partner. Later she had her own law office in the White Station Tower. In 2001, she was honored by the Association for Women Attorneys for outstanding achievements in and for the legal profession.

=== House and legislation ===
From her election to the Tennessee House of Representatives in 1990, over thirteen years Carol rose to various leadership positions, including chair of the House Children & Family Affairs Standing Committee, House Majority Whip, and chair of the Shelby County delegation. She passed the child care reform law as reported in Time magazine, The New York Times, and statewide news publications. She also secured the $200,000 state grant to create the UT Memphis Center for Women's Health. She is now an elected Shelby County Circuit Court Judge ( Memphis metropolitan area) and took the countywide office on September 1, 2022.

=== Acclamations ===
Chumney has been recognized for her leadership with awards

- Tennessee Trial Lawyer's Consumer Protection Award (1995)
- Tennessee Citizen Action Leadership Award (1995)
- Tennessee Task Force Against Domestic Violence (1996)
- Tennessee Association for Education of Young Children
- University of Tennessee Health Science Leadership Award (2001)
- Tennessee Sierra Club (2001)
- Tennessee Development District Association Legislator of the Year Award (2003)
- National Democratic Leadership Council's A100 New Democrats to Watch (2003)
- Memphis Woman Magazine 50 Women Who Make a Difference (2003)

She created and hosts Tennessee Lookout, a public information show on the Library Channel 18.

Preceded by John Vergos	Memphis, Tennessee District 5 City Council Member; 2004–2008	Succeeded by Jim Strickland
