= Memphis City Council =

City government

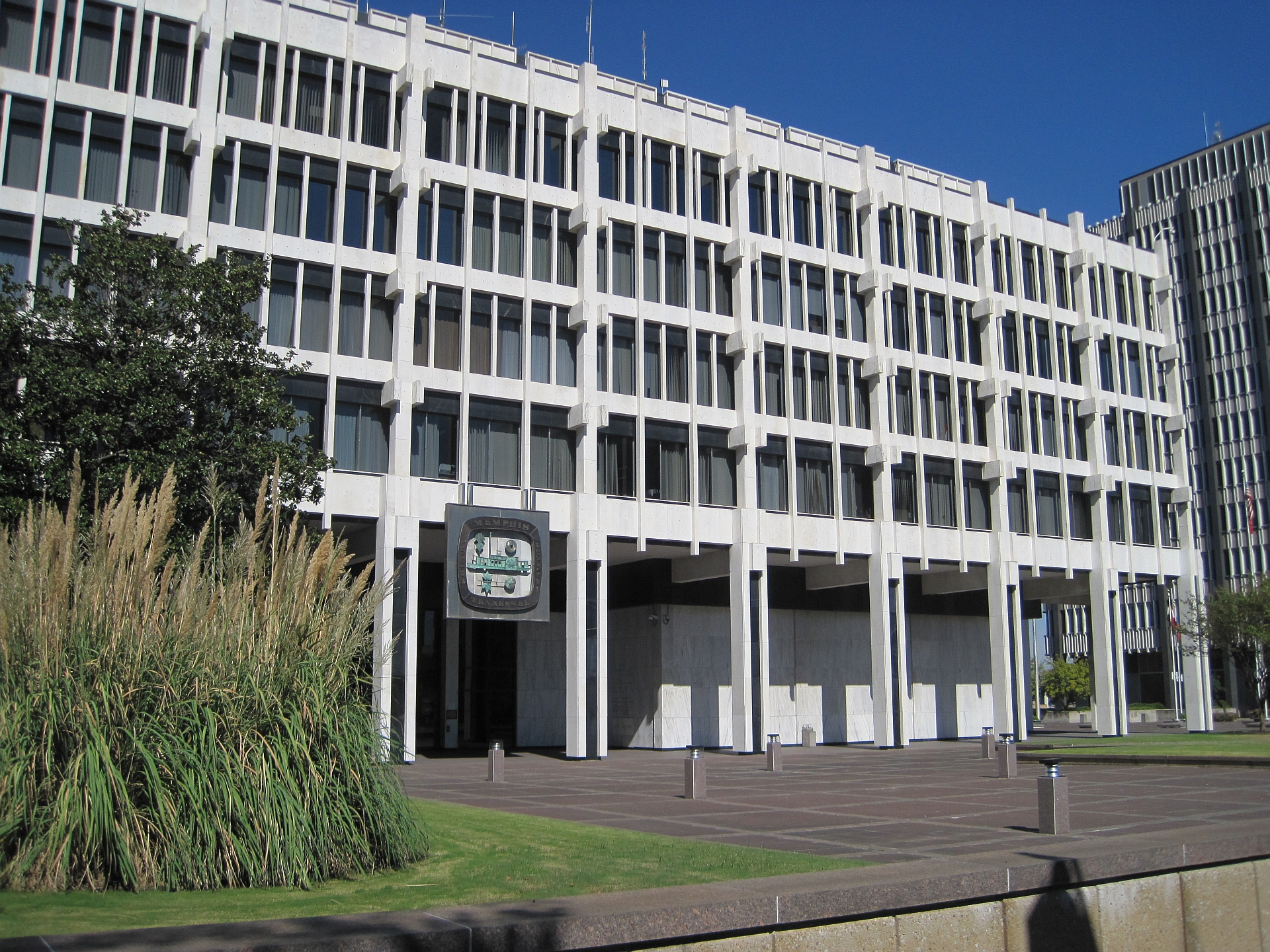
The City Council's chambers are in Memphis City Hall.

The Memphis City Council is the legislative branch of government for the city of Memphis, Tennessee. It is made up of 13 members: 7 single-district members and 6 "super district" members. Council members are elected to four-year terms with a two-term limit. The city is governed by Mayor Paul Young and the thirteen city council members. Memphis uses a strong-mayor form of government in which the city council acts as a check against the power of the executive branch, the mayor. The council is responsible for approving the city budget, making land use decisions, and approving, amending, or rejecting other legislative proposals. The council is also responsible for approving Memphis Gas Light and Water (MLGW) expenditures over $250,000 and salaries over $180,000 (March 22, 2022 Minutes, page 14); likewise, its annual budget and its rate increases.

Memphis City Council committees meet on every first and third Tuesday of every month.

The first city council took office in 1968, after the modern city charter had been approved by Memphis voters in a 1966 referendum. The 1966 charter set the salary for council members at $6,000, which was later raised to $20,100 in 1995, and later raised again to the current amount of $30,100. The 1966 charter provided for run-off elections when no candidate got a majority of the vote, but a federal judge overruled that section of the charter in 1991.

In 1995, the council adopted a new district plan which changed council positions to all districts. This plan provides for nine districts, seven with one representative each and two districts with three representatives each. In 2010, the council approved a new redistricting plan to reflect recent demographic shifts.

By law, Memphis municipal elections are Nonpartisan, in that candidates do not represent a specific political party.

== Current membership ==
The current Memphis City Council was elected in the October 2023 Memphis elections and was sworn in on January 2, 2024.

Memphis City Council, 2024-2027
District	Member	Took office
1	Rhonda Logan	2020
2	Jerri Green	2024
3	Pearl Eva Walker	2024
4	Jana Swearengen-Washington	2022
5	Philip Spinosa	2024
6	Edmund Ford, Sr.	2020
7	Michalyn Easter-Thomas	2020
8-1	JB Smiley, Jr. - Chairman	2020
8-2	Janika White	2024
8-3	Yolanda Cooper-Sutton	2024
9-1	Chase Carlisle	2020
9-2	J. Ford Canale - Vice Chairman	2018
9-3	Jeff Warren	2020
