= W. W. Herenton =

Former mayor of Memphis, Tennessee (born 1940)

Willie W. Herenton
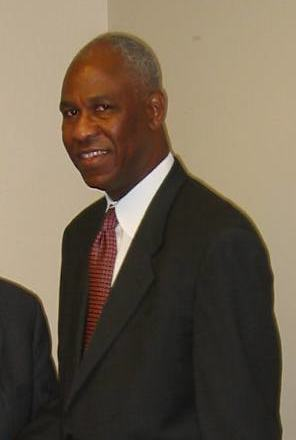

62nd Mayor of Memphis
- In office January 1, 1992 – July 30, 2009
- Preceded by: Richard Hackett
- Succeeded by: Myron Lowery (acting)

Personal details
- Born: Willie Wilbert Herenton; April 23, 1940 (age 86) Memphis, Tennessee, U.S.
- Party: Democratic
- Education: LeMoyne-Owen College (BA); University of Memphis (MEd); Southern Illinois University (EdD)

Willie Wilbert Herenton (born April 23, 1940) is an American politician from Memphis, Tennessee. He was the first elected African-American mayor of Memphis. He was elected to five consecutive terms and abruptly resigned the position mid-way through his fifth term in 2009.

== Early life and education ==
Willie Wilbert Herenton was born to Ruby Lee Harris in Memphis, Tennessee. Raised by a single mother, Herenton was encouraged at a young age to pursue his dreams of becoming a Golden Gloves boxer. Herenton graduated from Le Moyne-Owen College with a bachelors of science in Elementary Education and from the University of Memphis (formerly Memphis State University) with a masters in Educational Administration. However, segregation forced Herenton to leave Memphis to attain his doctorate in education at Southern Illinois University.

== Memphis City Schools ==
After graduating from Le Moyne-Owen, Herenton began working at Memphis City Schools as a fifth-grade teacher in Memphis. During the 1968 Memphis Sanitation Strike, Herenton marched in solidarity with the sanitation workers; however, the choice to march with Martin Luther King, Jr. and wear the sign declaring "I AM A MAN" resulted in threats of termination and ostracism from school district leadership and fellow teachers. But in 1969 Herenton was appointed principal of Bethel Grove Elementary and at 28 became the youngest principal ever hired in Memphis. Three years later, he completed his Ph.D. degree at Southern Illinois University. A year after returning from the Rockefeller Foundation Superintendent Training Program, Herenton became the Deputy Superintendent of Memphis City Schools. In 1979, Herenton became the first African-American superintendent of Memphis City Schools. During Herenton's 12-year tenure as MCS superintendent, ambitious programs aimed at creating opportunities and services to disadvantaged youth, as well as expanding teacher freedoms, were implemented. However, he was mired in controversy after accusations of sexual harassment from a female teacher surfaced in 1988, leading to his divorce, an admission of an affair, and an out-of-court settlement. Further criticism of his performance as superintendent, as well as an impending mayoral campaign, led him to resign in 1991.

== Mayor of Memphis ==
=== Elections ===
In April 1991, more than 3000 predominantly African-American citizens of Memphis gathered in the Mid-South Coliseum and selected Herenton as the consensus candidate for the 1991 mayoral election. On October 3, Herenton became the first African-American to be elected mayor of Memphis (J.O. Patterson, Jr. served as interim mayor in 1982). Herenton won his first term by defeating incumbent mayor Richard Hackett in 1991 by 146 votes.

Herenton went on to win five consecutive mayoral elections. He was elected to his fifth term in office on October 4, 2007.

=== Tenure ===
During his tenure, some critics referred to him as "King Willie", after he was televised saying he didn't care whether Memphians voted for him or not. Another scandal ensued when he started a second chance program for first time offenders, allegedly connected to his relationship to a female felon.

Herenton was praised for putting the city on solid financial footing and presiding over the redevelopment of downtown Memphis, an influx of private capital investment, and the arrival of two professional sports teams: the Memphis Grizzlies and Memphis Redbirds.

Herenton was long-listed for the 2008 World Mayor award; however, he was not selected for this honor.

On March 20, 2008, Herenton announced that he would be stepping down from his position as Memphis' mayor, effective July 31, 2008. This move angered many politicians in the city, including Councilwoman Carol Chumney, who had run for mayor of Memphis in the October 2007 election. He made this announcement just over 90 days after his fifth re-election. Herenton stated that he was departing office in order to seek the position of superintendent of Memphis City Schools, amidst speculation that he was stepping down in advance of a run for Congress or because of impending legal troubles from an ongoing criminal investigation at City Hall. He later stated that he would not leave the office of mayor unless he got the position as the superintendent of schools. Herenton said that he only ran for re-election in 2007 to protect the city of Memphis from the other main candidates, Herman Morris and Councilwoman Carol Chumney. When the stated day came, Herenton failed to step down as Mayor and said he would serve out his term until 2011.

In April 2009, Herenton formed an exploratory committee to run in the 2010 US Congressional Election for the 9th District of Tennessee, presumably intending to challenge incumbent Steve Cohen in the Democratic primary. On June 25, 2009, Herenton announced his resignation as Mayor, effective July 10. On July 6, he announced that he would delay his retirement until July 30.

He resigned from office on July 30, 2009. Memphis City Council Chairman Myron Lowery was appointed as mayor pro tempore. Lowery served for three months before losing to A.C. Wharton in a special election to serve out the remainder of Herenton's term.

== 2010 congressional campaign ==
In 2010, Herenton announced that he would run against Congressman Steve Cohen in the Democratic primary for Tennessee's 9th congressional district—a majority African-American and heavily Democratic-leaning district.

In September 2009, Herenton attracted controversy with his statement in a radio interview that Cohen "really does not think very much of African-Americans" and that "[Cohen]'s played the black community well." Herenton's campaign manager, Sidney Chism, who is African American, told the New York Times that the Memphis-area congressional seat held by Cohen, who is Jewish, "was set aside for people who look like me. It wasn't set aside for a Jew or a Christian. It was set aside so that blacks could have representation." The National Jewish Democratic Council (NJDC) criticized Herenton for these remarks, stating that his comments were "unacceptable in a Democratic primary or anywhere in our political discourse."

Despite Herenton's attempts to isolate Cohen from the African-American voters, Cohen received endorsements from both President Barack Obama and the Congressional Black Caucus. Cohen won the Democratic primary election, with Herenton taking 20% of the vote.

== 2019 and 2023 mayoral campaigns ==
On April 5, 2018, Herenton announced his intention to run for mayor of Memphis for a sixth term, challenging the incumbent Jim Strickland in the 2019 Memphis mayoral election. Strickland won the election, and Herenton conceded to Strickland that night.

On February 6, 2023, Herenton joined the race to succeed Strickland. Herenton placed third with 22% of the vote, behind Shelby County Sheriff Floyd Bonner and CEO of the Downtown Memphis Commission Paul Young, who was elected mayor.

== Personal life ==
Herenton has four children; he and his first wife are divorced. His grandson Willie played college basketball for the University of Miami Hurricanes.

Political offices
Preceded by Richard Hackett	Mayor of Memphis; 1992–2009	Succeeded by Myron Lowery
