= List of mayors of Memphis, Tennessee =

This is a list of mayors of Memphis, Tennessee.

== History ==
As a result of a yellow fever epidemic in 1879, Memphis lost so much of its population that it was disincorporated and was not rechartered until 1895. This accounts for the absence of a mayor during the period 1879–1893. The city leaders during this period were known as President of the Taxing District. They were David T. Porter (1879-1881), John Overton (1881-1883), David P. Hadden (1883-1891), William D. Bethell (1891-1893) and Walker L. Clapp (1893-1895) who then became mayor. See the article History of Memphis, Tennessee for more information.

Image	Mayor	Years	Notes
	Marcus B. Winchester	1827–1829	
	Isaac Rawlings	1829–1831	
	Seth Wheatley	1831–1832	
	Robert Lawrence	1832–1833	
	Isaac Rawlings (2nd term)	1833–1836	
	Enoch Banks	1836–1837	
	John H. Morgan	1837–1838	
	Enoch Banks (2nd term)	1838–1839	
	Thomas Dixon	1839–1841	
	William Spickernagle	1841–1842	
	Edwin Hickman	1842–1845	
	Jesse J. Finley	1845–1846	
	Edwin Hickman (2nd term)	1846–1847	
	Enoch Banks (3rd term)	1847–1848	
	Gardner E. Locke	1848–1849	
	Edwin Hickman (3rd term)	1849–1852	
	A. B. Taylor	1852–1855	
	Addison H. Douglass	1855–1856	
	Thomas B. Carroll	1856–1857	
	Richard D. Baugh	1857–1861	
	John Park	1861–1864	
	Thomas H. Harris	1864	
	Channing Richards	1864–1865	
	John Park (2nd term)	1865–1866	
	William Lofland	1866–1868	
	Edgar M. McDavitt	1868	
	John W. Leftwich	1868–1869	
	John T. Swayne	1869	
	John W. Leftwich (2nd term)	1869–1870	
	John Johnson	1870–1874	
	John Loague	1874–1876	
	John R. Flippin	1876–1879	
	(None)	1879–1895	As a result of a yellow fever epidemic in 1879, Memphis lost so much of its population that it was disincorporated and was not rechartered until 1895. This accounts for the absence of a mayor during the period 1879–1893. The city leaders during this period were known as President of the Taxing District. They were David T. Porter (1879-1881), John Overton (1881-1883), David P. Hadden (1883-1891), William D. Bethell (1891-1893) and Walker L. Clapp (1893-1895) who then became mayor. See the article History of Memphis, Tennessee for more information.
	Walker L. Clapp	1895–1898	
	Joseph John "JJ" Williams	1898–1906	
	James H. Malone	1906–1910	
	E. H. "Boss" Crump	1910–1915	
	George C. Love	1915–1916	
	Thomas C. Ashcroft	1916–1917	
	Harry H. Litty	1917–1918	
	Frank L. Monteverde	1918–1919	
	Rowlett Paine	1920–1927	
	Watkins Overton	1928–1939	
	E. H. "Boss" Crump (2nd term)	1940	
	Joseph P. Boyle	1940	
	Walter Chandler	1940–1946	
	Joseph P. Boyle (2nd term)	1946	
	Sylvanus W. Polk, Sr.	1946–1947	
	James J. Pleasants, Jr.	1947–1949	
	Watkins Overton	1949–1953	
	Frank T. Tobey	1953–1955	
	Walter Chandler	1955	
	Edmund Orgill	1956–1959	
	Henry Loeb	1960–1963	
	Claude Armour	1963	
	William B. Ingram	1963–1967	
	Henry Loeb (2nd term)	1968–1971	
	J. Wyeth Chandler	1972–1982	Resigned from office to accept a circuit court judgeship
	J.O. Patterson, Jr.	1982	Served as interim mayor. First African-American mayor. Former State Representative (one term) and former State Senator (two terms).
	Wallace Madewell	1982	
	Richard C. Hackett	1982–1991	
	W. W. Herenton	1992–2009	First elected African-American mayor
	Myron Lowery	2009 (Mayor pro tem)	3rd African-American mayor
	A C Wharton	2009–2015	2nd elected African American mayor
	Jim Strickland	2016–2024	
	Paul Young	2024–present	5th African-American mayor.

== See also ==
- Timeline of Memphis, Tennessee
