= 2020 Tennessee Senate election =

2020 Tennessee State Senate election
- November 3, 2020

16 of the 33 seats in the Tennessee State Senate 17 seats needed for a majority
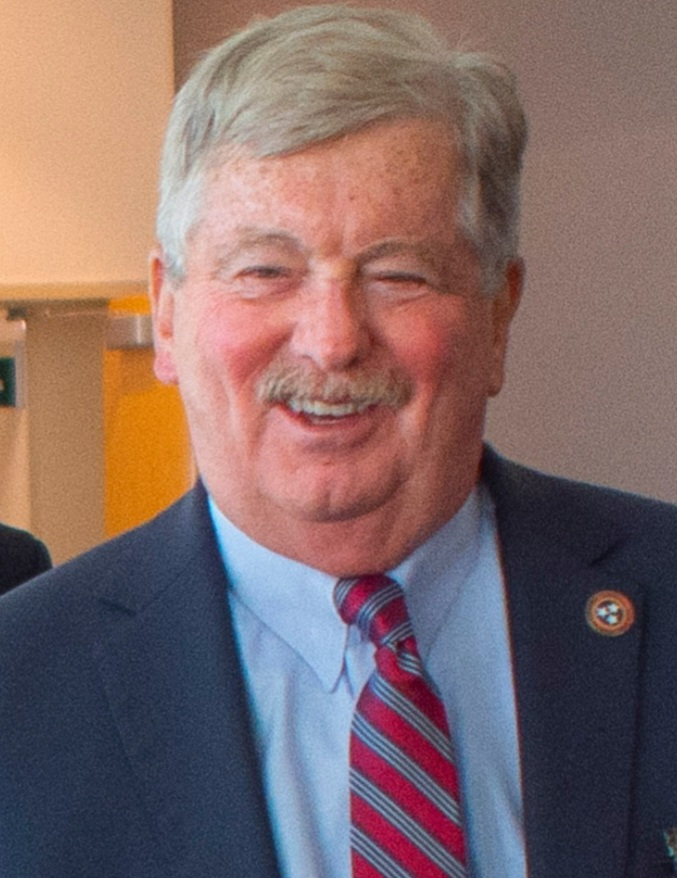

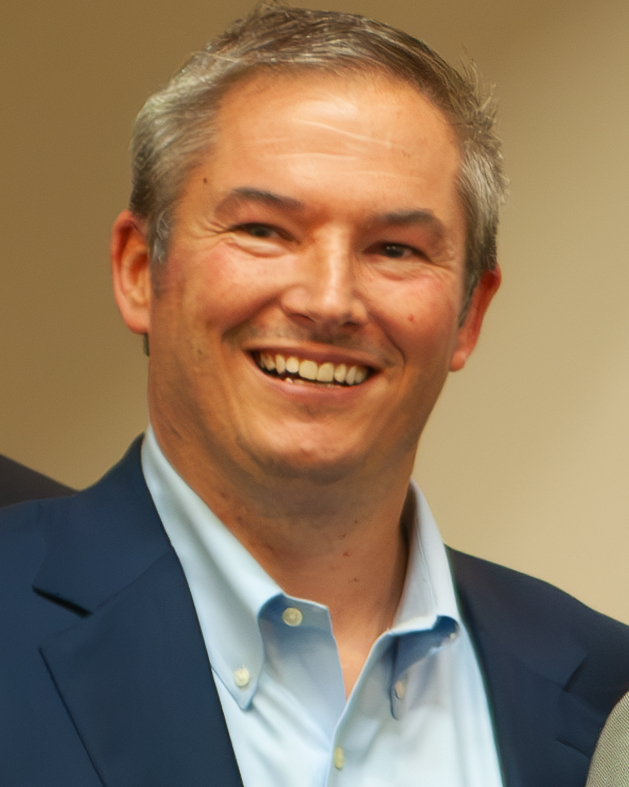
	Majority party	Minority party
Leader	Randy McNally	Jeff Yarbro
Party	Republican	Democratic
Leader's seat	5th - Oak Ridge	21st - Nashville
Last election	28 seats	5 seats
Seats before	28	5
Seats won	27	6
Seat change	▼1	▲1
Popular vote	939,727	321,494
Percentage	71.41%	24.43%
Swing	▲11.78%	▼13.44%
- Democratic gain Republican hold Democratic hold No election 50–60% 60–70% 70–80% >90% 50–60% >90%
Speaker before election
Randy McNally
Republican
Elected Speaker
Randy McNally
Republican

The 2020 Tennessee State Senate election was held on November 3, 2020, to elect 16 of the 33 seats for the Tennessee's State Senate. The elections coincided with the Presidential, U.S. Senate, U.S. House, and State House elections. The primary elections were held on August 6, 2020, with the exception of presidential primaries held on March 3 of that year.

Republicans lost District 20, which includes suburban parts of Nashville in Davidson County.

== Retirements ==
One incumbent did not run for re-election in 2020. That incumbent was:

=== Republicans ===
1. District 26: Dolores Gresham: Retiring

== Incumbents defeated ==
=== In the general election ===
==== Republicans ====
1. District 20: Steven Dickerson lost to Heidi Campbell.

== Predictions ==
Source	Ranking	As of
The Cook Political Report	Safe R	October 21, 2020

== Results summary ==
Summary of the November 3, 2020 Tennessee Senate election results
Party	Candidates	Votes		Seats				
Party	Candidates	No.	%	Before	Up	Won	After	+/–
Republican	15	939,727	71.41	28	15	14	27	▼1
Democratic	10	321,494	24.43	5	1	2	6	▲1
Independent	3	52,928	4.02	0	0	0	0	Steady
Write-in	2	1,777	0.14	0	0	0	0	Steady
Total		1,315,926	100	33	16	16	33	Steady

Popular vote
Republican	71.41%
Democratic	24.43%
Other	4.16%

Senate seats
Republican	81.82%
Democratic	18.18%

=== Close races ===
Two races were decided by a margin of under 10%:

District	Winner	Margin
District 10	Republican	6.32%
District 20	Democratic (gain)	3.52%

== Overview ==
District	Incumbent			Results	Candidates
District	Senator	Party	First elected	Results	Candidates
District 2	Art Swann	Republican	2017 (appointed)	Incumbent re-elected.	▌ ✓ Art Swann (Republican)
District 4	Jon Lundberg	Republican	2016	Incumbent re-elected.	▌ ✓ Jon Lundberg (Republican); ▌ Amber Riddle (Democratic)
District 6	Becky Duncan Massey	Republican	2011 (special)	Incumbent re-elected.	▌ ✓ Becky Duncan Massey (Republican); ▌ Jane George (Democratic)
District 8	Frank S. Niceley	Republican	2012	Incumbent re-elected.	▌ ✓ Frank S. Niceley (Republican)
District 10	Todd Gardenhire	Republican	2012	Incumbent re-elected.	▌ ✓ Todd Gardenhire (Republican); ▌Glenn Scruggs (Democratic)
District 12	Ken Yager	Republican	2008	Incumbent re-elected.	▌ ✓ Ken Yager (Republican)
District 14	Shane Reeves	Republican	2018 (special)	Incumbent re-elected.	▌ ✓ Shane Reeves (Republican); ▌Chase Clemons (Democratic)
District 16	Janice Bowling	Republican	2012	Incumbent re-elected.	▌ ✓ Janice Bowling (Republican); ▌Sheila Younglove (Democratic)
District 18	Ferrell Haile	Republican	2010; 2011 (retired); 2012	Incumbent re-elected.	▌ ✓ Ferrell Haile (Republican); ▌John Gentry (Independent)
District 20	Steven Dickerson	Republican	2012	Incumbent lost re-election. New member elected. Democratic gain.	▌ ✓ Heidi Campbell (Democratic); ▌Steven Dickerson (Republican)
District 22	Bill Powers	Republican	2019 (special)	Incumbent re-elected.	▌ ✓ Bill Powers (Republican); ▌Ronnie Glynn (Democratic)
District 24	John Stevens	Republican	2012	Incumbent re-elected.	▌ ✓ John Stevens (Republican); ▌Yahweh Yahweh (Independent)
District 26	Dolores Gresham	Republican	2008	Incumbent retired. New member elected. Republican hold.	▌ ✓ Page Walley (Republican); ▌Civil Miller-Watkins (Democratic)
District 28	Joey Hensley	Republican	2012	Incumbent re-elected.	▌ ✓ Joey Hensley (Republican); ▌James Gray (Independent)
District 30	Sara Kyle	Democratic	2014 (special)	Incumbent re-elected.	▌ ✓ Sara Kyle (Democratic)
District 32	Paul Rose	Republican	2019 (special)	Incumbent re-elected.	▌ ✓ Paul Rose (Republican); ▌Julie Byrd Ashworth (Democratic)

== District 2 ==
Following Republican Doug Overbey's appointment as U.S. Attorney for the Eastern District of Tennessee in 2017, fellow Republican Art Swann was appointed to replace him.

2020 Tennessee's 2nd Senate district election
- November 3, 2020
Nominee	Art Swann
Party	Republican
Popular vote	79,674
Percentage	97.82%
Senator before election
Art Swann
Republican
Elected Senator
Art Swann
Republican

=== Republican primary ===
Republican primary
Party	Candidate	Votes	%
Republican	Art Swann (incumbent)	20,675	100
Total votes		20,675	100

=== General election ===
Tennessee's 2nd State Senate District general election, 2020
Party	Candidate	Votes	%
Republican	Art Swann (incumbent)	79,674	97.82
Write-in	Patti Larimer Young	1,774	2.18
Total votes		81,448	100
Republican hold			

== District 4 ==
2020 Tennessee's 4th Senate district election
- November 3, 2020
Nominee	Jon Lundberg	Amber Riddle
Party	Republican	Democratic
Popular vote	65,638	17,381
Percentage	79.06%	20.94%
Senator before election
Jon Lundberg
Republican
Elected Senator
Jon Lundberg
Republican

=== Republican primary ===
Republican primary
Party	Candidate	Votes	%
Republican	Jon Lundberg (incumbent)	21,051	100
Total votes		21,051	100

=== Democratic primary ===
Democratic primary
Party	Candidate	Votes	%
Democratic	Amber Riddle	2,967	100
Total votes		2,967	100

=== General election ===
Tennessee's 4th State Senate District general election, 2020
Party	Candidate	Votes	%
Republican	Jon Lundberg (incumbent)	65,638	79.06
Democratic	Amber Riddle	17,381	20.94
Total votes		83,019	100
Republican hold			

== District 6 ==
2020 Tennessee's 6th Senate district election
- November 3, 2020
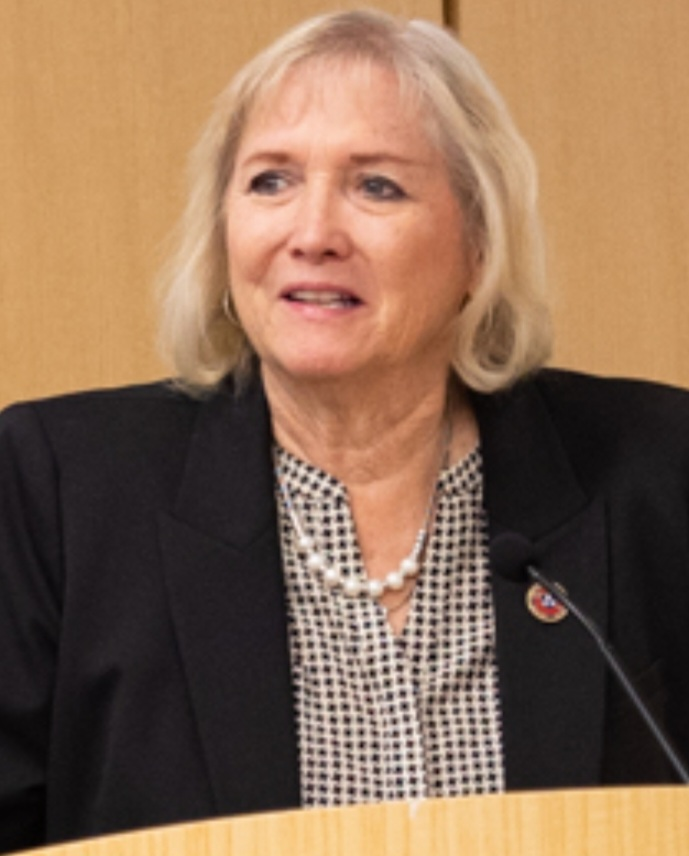

Nominee	Becky Duncan Massey	Jane George
Party	Republican	Democratic
Popular vote	61,286	35,785
Percentage	63.14%	36.87%
Senator before election
Becky Duncan Massey
Republican
Elected Senator
Becky Duncan Massey
Republican

The 6th Senate district covers a large portion of Knox County. It covers southern and western portions of Knoxville, Seymour, and Strawberry Plains. The district had been represented by Becky Duncan Massey.

=== Republican primary ===
Republican primary
Party	Candidate	Votes	%
Republican	Becky Duncan Massey (incumbent)	19,741	100
Total votes		19,741	100

=== Democratic primary ===
Democratic primary
Party	Candidate	Votes	%
Democratic	Jane George	7,783	63.96
Democratic	Sam Brown	4,386	36.04
Total votes		12,169	100

=== General election ===
Tennessee's 6th State Senate District general election, 2020
Party	Candidate	Votes	%
Republican	Becky Duncan Massey (incumbent)	61,286	63.14
Democratic	Jane George	35,785	36.87
Total votes		97,071	100
Republican hold			

== District 8 ==
2020 Tennessee's 8th Senate district election
- November 3, 2020
Nominee	Frank Niceley
Party	Republican
Popular vote	59,713
Percentage	100.00%
Senator before election
Frank Niceley
Republican
Elected Senator
Frank Niceley
Republican

=== Republican primary ===
Republican primary
Party	Candidate	Votes	%
Republican	Frank S. Niceley (incumbent)	18,298	100
Total votes		18,298	100

=== General election ===
Tennessee's 8th State Senate District general election, 2020
Party	Candidate	Votes	%
Republican	Frank S. Niceley (incumbent)	59,713	100
Total votes		59,713	100
Republican hold			

== District 10 ==
2020 Tennessee's 10th Senate district election
- November 3, 2020
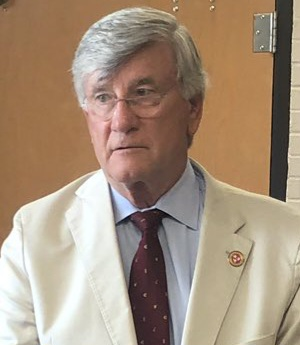

Nominee	Todd Gardenhire	Glenn Scruggs
Party	Republican	Democratic
Popular vote	45,049	39,688
Percentage	53.16%	46.84%
- County results Gardenhire: 80–90% Scruggs: 50–60%
Senator before election
Todd Gardenhire
Republican
Elected Senator
Todd Gardenhire
Republican

The 10th senate district covers part of Bradley County and part of Hamilton County. The district had been represented by Todd Gardenhire.

Todd Gardenhire won re-election by 6.3%, defeating his Democratic opponent Glenn Scruggs.

In the concurrent 2020 presidential race, Donald Trump narrowly carried this district, winning by 3.4%.

=== Republican primary ===
Republican primary
Party	Candidate	Votes	%
Republican	Todd Gardenhire (incumbent)	13,720	100
Total votes		13,720	100

=== Democratic primary ===
Democratic primary
Party	Candidate	Votes	%
Democratic	Glenn Scruggs	10,952	100
Total votes		10,952	100

=== General election ===
Tennessee's 10th State Senate District general election, 2020
Party	Candidate	Votes	%
Republican	Todd Gardenhire (incumbent)	45,049	53.16
Democratic	Glenn Scruggs	39,688	46.84
Total votes		84,737	100
Republican hold			

== District 12 ==
2020 Tennessee's 12th Senate district election
- November 3, 2020
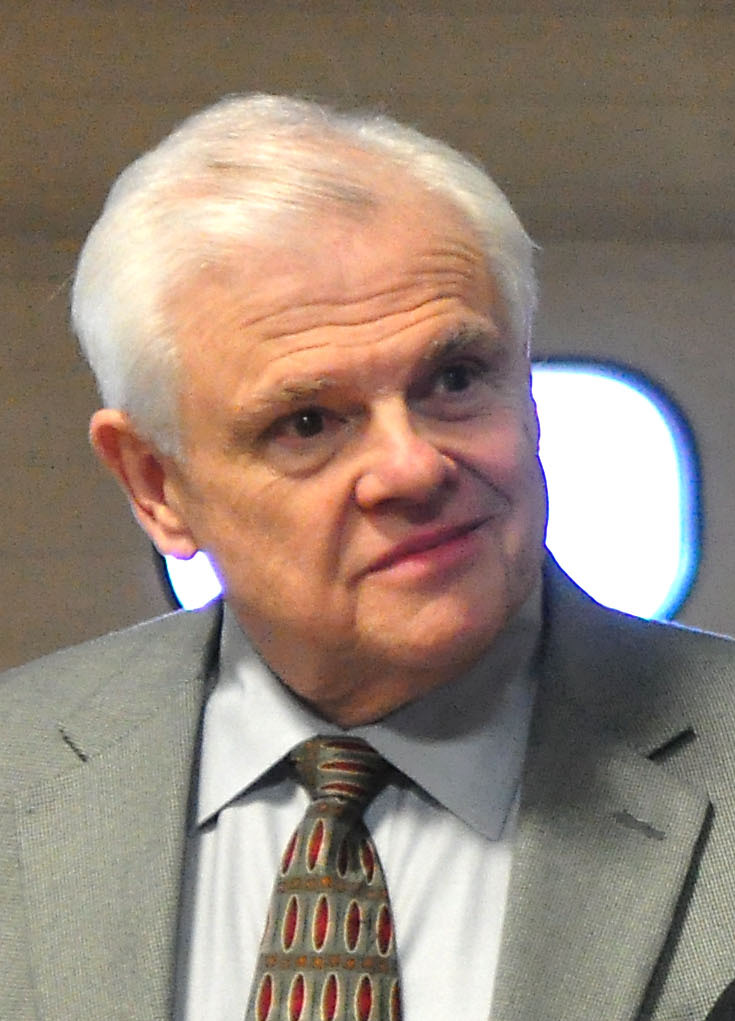
Nominee	Ken Yager
Party	Republican
Popular vote	69,042
Percentage	100.00%
Senator before election
Ken Yager
Republican
Elected Senator
Ken Yager
Republican

=== Republican primary ===
Republican primary
Party	Candidate	Votes	%
Republican	Ken Yager (incumbent)	20,408	100
Total votes		20,408	100

=== General election ===
Tennessee's 12th State Senate District general election, 2020
Party	Candidate	Votes	%
Republican	Ken Yager (incumbent)	69,042	100
Total votes		69,042	100
Republican hold			

== District 14 ==
There was a special election to succeed Jim Tracy In March 2018. Republican Shane Reeves defeated Democrat Gayle Jordan in the general election, with 71.7% of the vote.

2020 Tennessee's 14th Senate district election
- November 3, 2020
Nominee	Shane Reeves	Chase Clemons
Party	Republican	Democratic
Popular vote	62,351	24,440
Percentage	71.84%	28.16%
Senator before election
Shane Reeves
Republican
Elected Senator
Shane Reeves
Republican

Reeves won re-election to a full term in 2020, receiving 71.8% of the vote.

=== Republican primary ===
Republican primary
Party	Candidate	Votes	%
Republican	Shane Reeves (incumbent)	20,195	100
Total votes		20,195	100

==== Democratic primary ====
Democratic primary
Party	Candidate	Votes	%
Democratic	Chase Clemons	6,475	100
Total votes		6,475	100

=== General election ===
Tennessee's 14th State Senate District general election, 2020
Party	Candidate	Votes	%
Republican	Shane Reeves (incumbent)	62,351	71.84
Democratic	Chase Clemons	24,440	28.16
Total votes		86,791	100
Republican hold			

== District 16 ==
2020 Tennessee's 16th Senate district election
- November 3, 2020
Nominee	Janice Bowling	Sheila Younglove
Party	Republican	Democratic
Popular vote	62,379	19,687
Percentage	76.01%	23.99%
Senator before election
Janice Bowling
Republican
Elected Senator
Janice Bowling
Republican

=== Republican primary ===
Republican primary
Party	Candidate	Votes	%
Republican	Janice Bowling (incumbent)	21,638	100
Total votes		21,638	100

==== Democratic primary ====
Democratic primary
Party	Candidate	Votes	%
Democratic	Sheila Younglove	6,183	100
Total votes		6,183	100

=== General election ===
Tennessee's 16th State Senate District general election, 2020
Party	Candidate	Votes	%
Republican	Janice Bowling (incumbent)	62,379	76.01
Democratic	Sheila Younglove	19,687	23.99
Total votes		82,066	100
Republican hold			

== District 18 ==
2020 Tennessee's 18th Senate district election
- November 3, 2020
Nominee	Ferrell Haile	John A. Gentry
Party	Republican	Independent
Popular vote	68,141	26,261
Percentage	72.18%	27.82%
Senator before election
Ferrell Haile
Republican
Elected Senator
Ferrell Haile
Republican

The 18th senate district is based in Sumner and Trousdale Counties, and covers parts of eastern Davidson County. The district had been represented by Republican and Senate President Ferrell Haile.

=== Republican primary ===
Republican primary
Party	Candidate	Votes	%
Republican	Ferrell Haile (incumbent)	18,923	100
Total votes		18,923	100

=== General election ===
Tennessee's 18th State Senate District general election, 2020
Party	Candidate	Votes	%
Republican	Ferrell Haile (incumbent)	68,141	72.18
Independent	John A. Gentry	26,261	27.82
Total votes		94,402	100
Republican hold			

== District 20 ==
2020 Tennessee's 20th Senate district election
- November 3, 2020
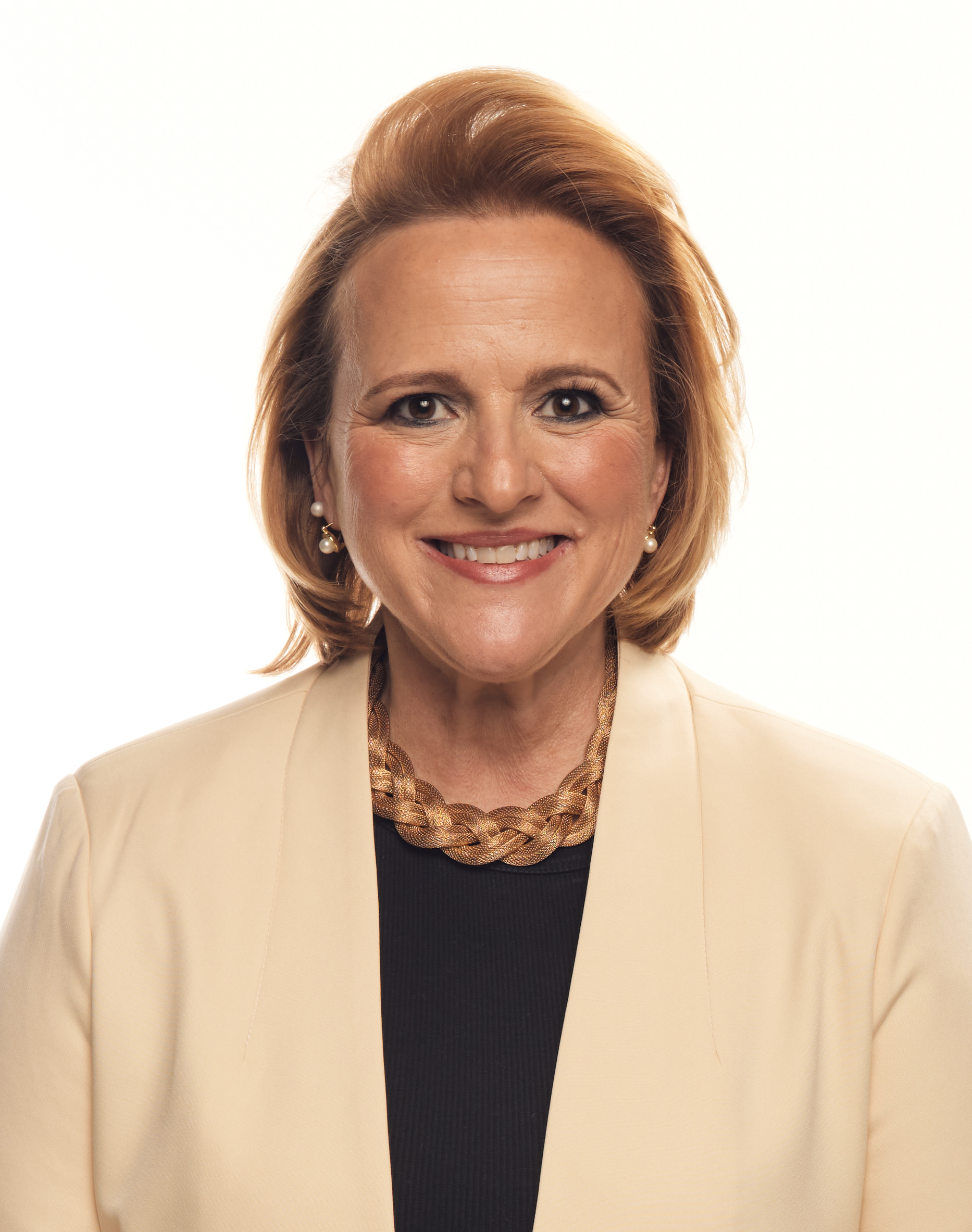

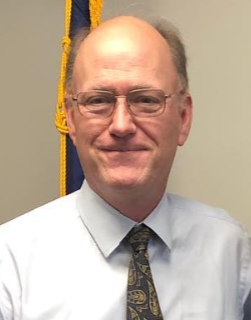
Nominee	Heidi Campbell	Steven Dickerson
Party	Democratic	Republican
Popular vote	58,746	54,755
Percentage	51.76%	48.24%
- Precinct results Campbell: 50–60% 60–70% 70–80% >90% Dickerson: 50–60% 60–70% 70–80% No data
Senator before election
Steven Dickerson
Republican
Elected Senator
Heidi Campbell
Democratic

The 20th senate district was based in Davidson County, and encompassed many of Nashville's wealthy inner suburbs, including Forest Hills, Belle Meade, and parts of Oak Hill and Goodlettsville. The district had been represented by Republican Steven Dickerson, who won re-election in 2016 by 12.5%. The district had been labeled competitive, and Dickerson was considered the most vulnerable incumbent heading into 2020, as the district had been trending leftwards.

Incumbent Republican Steven Dickerson narrowly lost re-election to Democratic nominee Heidi Campbell by 3.5%. This was the first time since 2006 that a Democrat was able to flip a Republican held seat.

In the concurrent 2020 presidential race, Democratic nominee Joe Biden comfortably carried this district, winning by 9.2%.

=== Republican primary ===
Republican primary
Party	Candidate	Votes	%
Republican	Steven Dickerson (incumbent)	14,345	100.00%
Total votes		14,345	100.00%

=== Democratic primary ===
Democratic primary
Party	Candidate	Votes	%
Democratic	Heidi Campbell	13,441	51.37%
Democratic	Kimi Abernathy	12,723	48.63%
Total votes		26,164	100.00%

=== General election ===
==== Polling ====
Poll source	Date(s) administered	Sample size (Note: Key: A – all adults RV – registered voters LV – likely voters V – unclear)	Margin of error	Steve Dickerson (R)	Heidi Campbell (D)	Undecided
Change Research/Heidi Campbell (Note: Poll sponsored by Campbell's campaign)	August 31 – September 1, 2020	531 (LV)	± 4.2%	47%	49%	4%

Tennessee's 20th State Senate District general election, 2020
Party	Candidate	Votes	%
Democratic	Heidi Campbell	58,746	51.76%
Republican	Steven Dickerson (incumbent)	54,755	48.24%
Total votes		113,501	100.00%
Democratic gain from Republican			

== District 22 ==
2020 Tennessee's 22nd Senate district election
- November 3, 2020
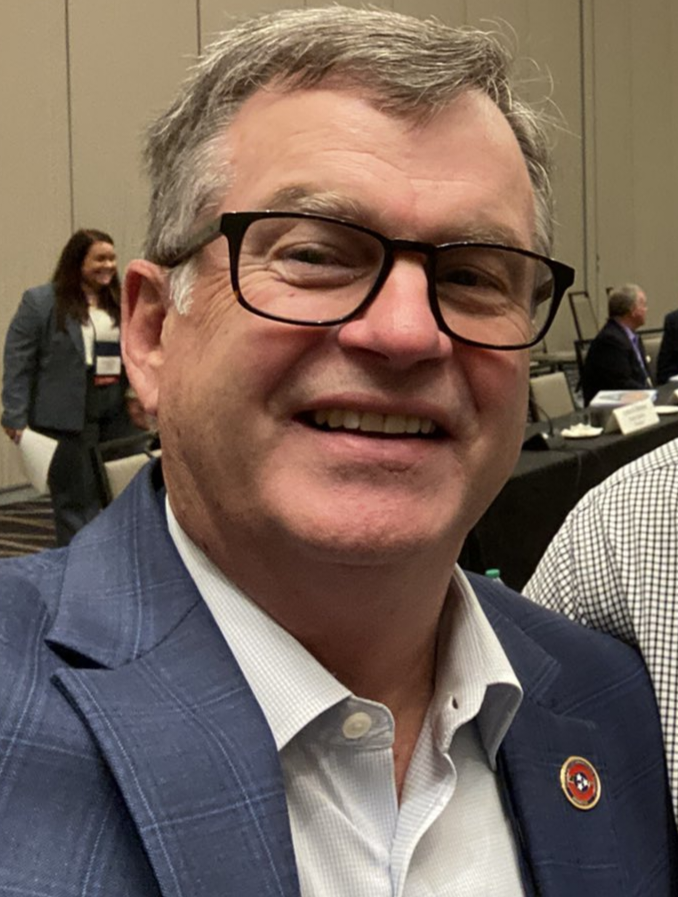

Nominee	Bill Powers	Ronnie Glynn
Party	Republican	Democratic
Popular vote	49,767	30,383
Percentage	62.09%	37.91%
- Powers: 50–60% 60–70% 70–80% 80–90% Glynn: 50–60% 60–70%
Senator before election
Bill Powers
Republican
Elected Senator
Bill Powers
Republican

The 22nd senate district was based in Clarksville, where it covered Montgomery County, as well as Stewart and Houston Counties.

A special election was held on April 23, 2019 due to Senator Mark Green stepping down from his position because he was elected to the U.S. Congress, causing a vacancy. Bill Powers ran as a Republican against Democratic Juanita Charles as well as Independent party members Doyle Clark and David Cutting. Powers won that special election with 53.6% of the vote.

=== Republican primary ===
Republican primary
Party	Candidate	Votes	%
Republican	Bill Powers (incumbent)	8,338	52.75
Republican	Doug Englen	7,468	47.25
Total votes		15,806	100

=== Democratic primary ===
Democratic primary
Party	Candidate	Votes	%
Democratic	Ronnie Glynn	6,724	100
Total votes		6,724	100

=== General election ===
Tennessee's 22nd State Senate District general election, 2020
Party	Candidate	Votes	%
Republican	Bill Powers (incumbent)	49,767	62.09
Democratic	Ronnie Glynn	30,383	37.91
Total votes		80,150	100
Republican hold			

By county

County	Powers	%	Glynn	%	Total
Houston	2,643	75.51%	857	24.49%	2,969
Montgomery	42,460	59.93%	28,394	40.07%	70,854
Stewart	4,664	80.47%	1,132	19.53%	3,500

== District 24 ==
2020 Tennessee's 24th Senate district election
- November 3, 2020
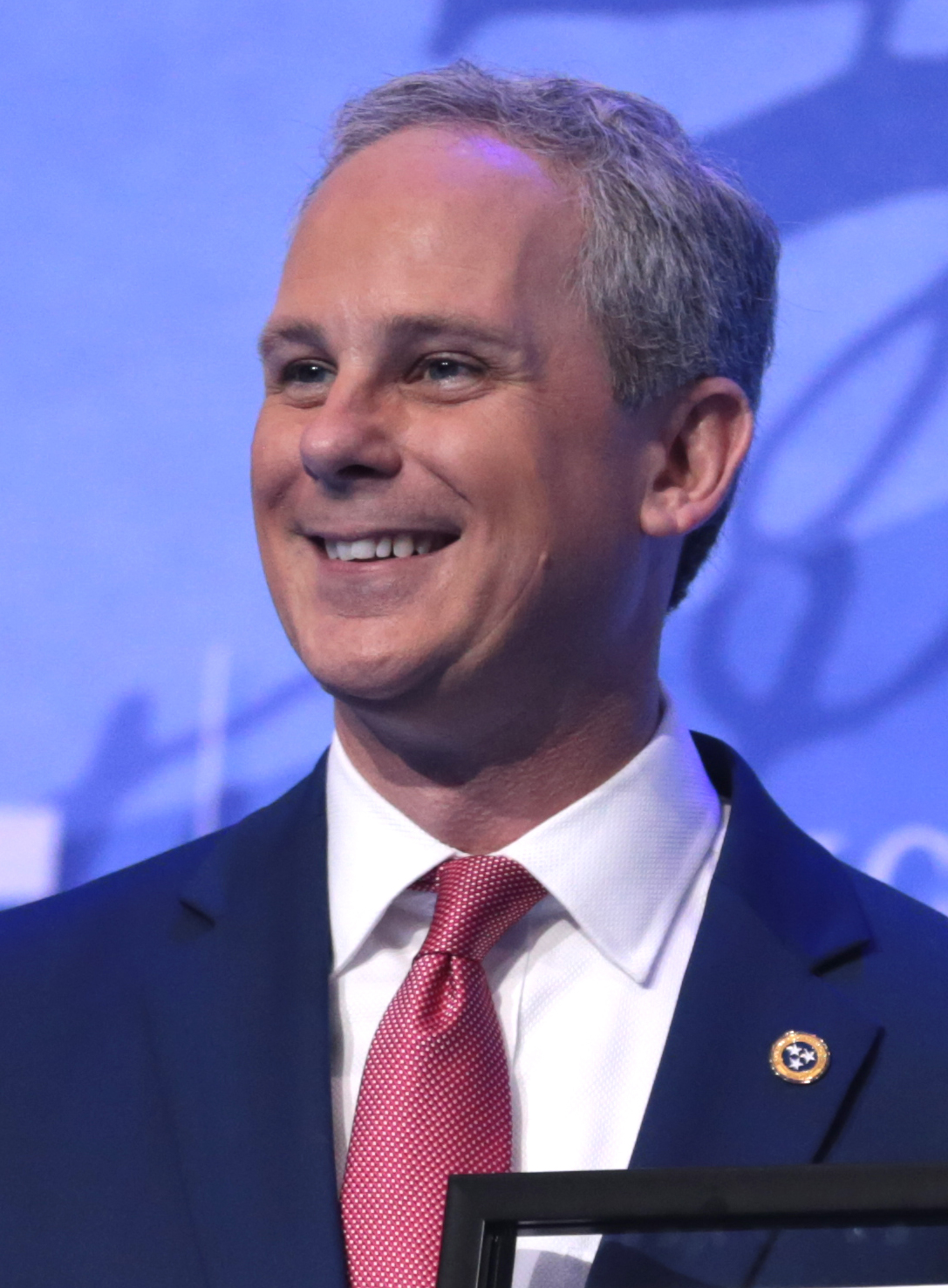

Nominee	John Stevens	Yahweh Yahweh
Party	Republican	Independent
Popular vote	63,532	8,795
Percentage	87.84%	12.16%
Senator before election
John Stevens
Republican
Elected Senator
John Stevens
Republican

=== Republican primary ===
Republican primary
Party	Candidate	Votes	%
Republican	John Stevens (incumbent)	13,061	61.24
Republican	Casey L. Hood	8,266	38.76
Total votes		21,327	100

=== General election ===
Tennessee's 24th State Senate District general election, 2020
Party	Candidate	Votes	%
Republican	John Stevens (incumbent)	63,532	87.84
Independent	Yahweh Yahweh	8,795	12.16
Total votes		72,327	100
Republican hold			

== District 26 ==
2020 Tennessee's 26th Senate district election
- November 3, 2020
Nominee	Page Walley	Civil Miller-Watkins
Party	Republican	Democratic
Popular vote	62,701	19,918
Percentage	75.89%	24.11%
- County results Walley: 60–70% 70–80% 80–90% Watkins: 50–60%
Senator before election
Dolores Gresham
Republican
Elected Senator
Page Walley
Republican

=== Republican primary ===
Republican primary
Party	Candidate	Votes	%
Republican	Page Walley	12,892	53.23
Republican	Jai Templeton	11,328	46.77
Total votes		24,220	100

=== Democratic primary ===
Democratic primary
Party	Candidate	Votes	%
Democratic	Civil Miller-Watkins	5,301	100
Total votes		5,301	100

=== General election ===
Tennessee's 26th State Senate District general election, 2020
Party	Candidate	Votes	%
Republican	Page Walley	62,701	75.89
Democratic	Civil Miller-Watkins	19,918	24.11
Total votes		82,619	100
Republican hold			

== District 28 ==
2020 Tennessee's 28th Senate district election
- November 3, 2020
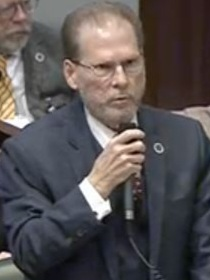

Nominee	Joey Hensley	James Anthony Gray
Party	Republican	Independent
Popular vote	65,050	17,872
Percentage	78.44%	21.55%
Senator before election
Joey Hensley
Republican
Elected Senator
Joey Hensley
Republican

=== Republican primary ===
Republican primary
Party	Candidate	Votes	%
Republican	Joey Hensley (incumbent)	21,083	100
Total votes		21,083	100

=== General election ===
Tennessee's 28th State Senate District general election, 2020
Party	Candidate	Votes	%
Republican	Joey Hensley (incumbent)	65,050	78.44
Independent	James Anthony Gray	17,872	21.55
Write-in	James R. Trusty	3	0.00
Total votes		82,925	100
Republican hold			

== District 30 ==
2020 Tennessee's 30th Senate district election
- November 3, 2020
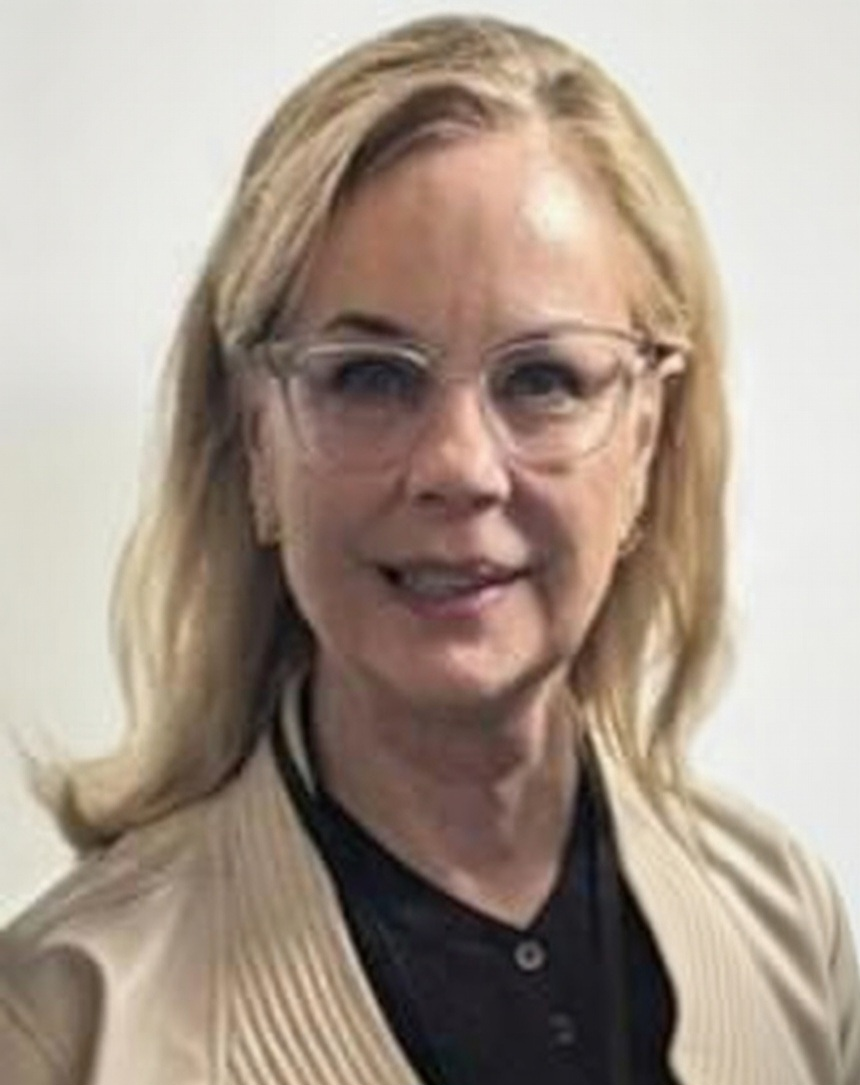
Nominee	Sara Kyle
Party	Democratic
Popular vote	43,895
Percentage	100.00%
Senator before election
Sara Kyle
Democratic
Elected Senator
Sara Kyle
Democratic

=== Democratic primary ===
Democratic primary
Party	Candidate	Votes	%
Democratic	Sara Kyle (incumbent)	10,241	70.47
Democratic	M. LaTroy Williams	4,292	29.53
Total votes		14,533	100

=== General election ===
Tennessee's 30th State Senate District general election, 2020
Party	Candidate	Votes	%
Democratic	Sara Kyle (incumbent)	43,895	100
Total votes		43,895	100
Democratic hold			

== District 32 ==
2020 Tennessee's 32nd Senate district election
- November 3, 2020
Nominee	Paul Rose	Julie Byrd Ashworth
Party	Republican	Democratic
Popular vote	70,649	31,571
Percentage	69.12%	30.89%
Senator before election
Paul Rose
Republican
Elected Senator
Paul Rose
Republican

There was a special election to succeed Mark Norris on March 12, 2019. Republican Paul Rose defeated Democrat Eric Coleman in the general election, with 84.0% of the vote.

=== Republican primary ===
Republican primary
Party	Candidate	Votes	%
Republican	Paul Rose (incumbent)	17,294	76.40
Republican	Scott Throckmorton	5,342	23.60
Total votes		22,636	100

=== Democratic primary ===
Democratic primary
Party	Candidate	Votes	%
Democratic	Julie Byrd Ashworth	7,486	100
Total votes		7,486	100

=== General election ===
Tennessee's 32nd State Senate District general election, 2020
Party	Candidate	Votes	%
Republican	Paul Rose (incumbent)	70,649	69.12
Democratic	Julie Byrd Ashworth	31,571	30.89
Total votes		102,220	100
Republican hold			

== See also ==
- 2020 Tennessee elections
- 2020 Tennessee House of Representatives election

== Notes ==
Partisan clients
