= 2022 United States House of Representatives elections in Tennessee =

- November 8, 2022

All 9 Tennessee seats to the United States House of Representatives
- Turnout: 38.61% ▼30.69 pp
	Majority party	Minority party
Party	Republican	Democratic
Last election	7	2
Seats won	8	1
Seat change	▲1	▼1
Popular vote	1,099,462	581,902
Percentage	64.28%	34.02%
Swing	▲4.98%	▼4.88%

Republican hold Republican gain
Democratic hold
Republican
50–60%
60–70%
70–80%
80–90%
Democratic
50–60%
60–70%
70–80%

The 2022 United States House of Representatives elections in Tennessee were held on November 8, 2022, to elect the nine U.S. representatives from the state of Tennessee, one from each of the state's nine congressional districts. The elections coincided with other elections to the House of Representatives, elections to the United States Senate, and various state and local elections.

These elections were the first under Tennessee's new congressional map after redistricting was completed by the state government. During the general elections, Republican Andy Ogles flipped Tennessee's 5th congressional district, which was previously represented by Democrat Jim Cooper. With the number of Democrats in the delegation being reduced to just one, the 9th district's Steve Cohen, this represented the fewest Democrats sent to congress by Tennessee since the 41st Congress during reconstruction, an all Republican delegation.

== Redistricting ==
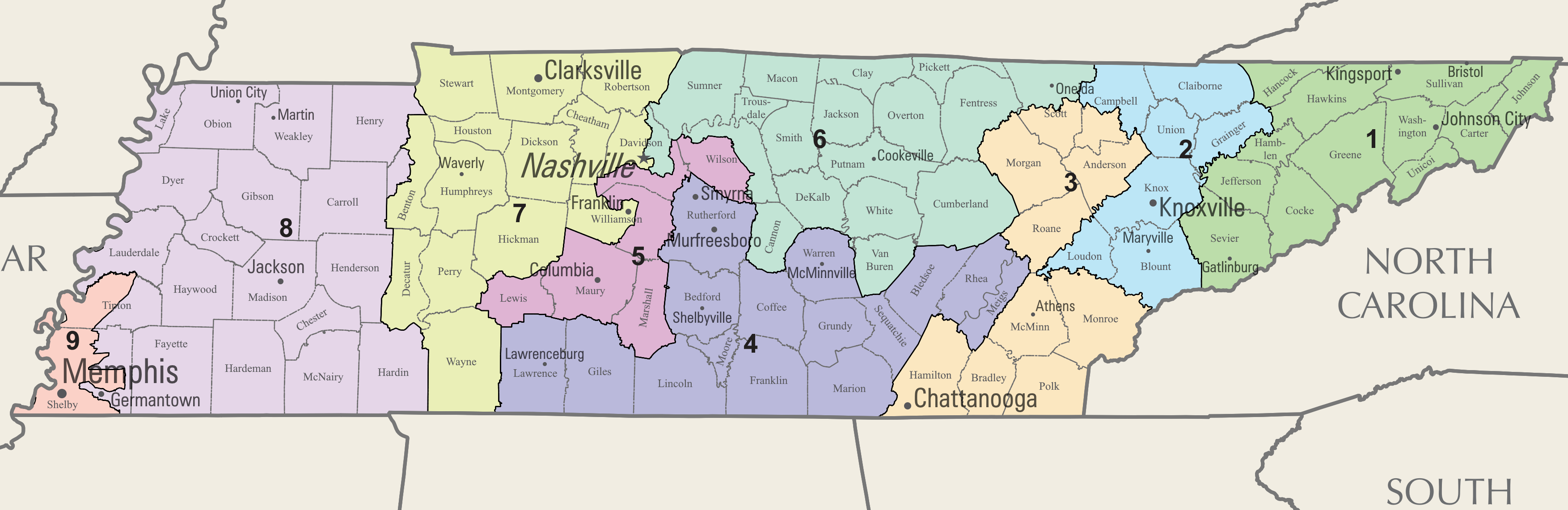
Tennessee's congressional districts, 2023-2033

The Tennessee Legislature drew new maps for Tennessee's congressional districts to account for the new 2020 census data. The Republican Party had a trifecta in the Tennessee Government at the time, giving them full control of the redistricting process. Legislators drew the maps for the state from late 2021 through early 2022. The maps that were eventually passed were widely criticized as partisan gerrymanders.

In particular, the redistricting split up the House district which had represented Democrat-heavy Nashville as long as Tennessee had been a state. The three districts that absorbed the city were then all won by Republicans, giving them 89% of Tennessee's U.S. House seats despite only getting 64% of the popular vote. This split also prevented urban voters from electing an African-American representative to the U.S. House, despite representing about 17% of the population.

== Overview ==
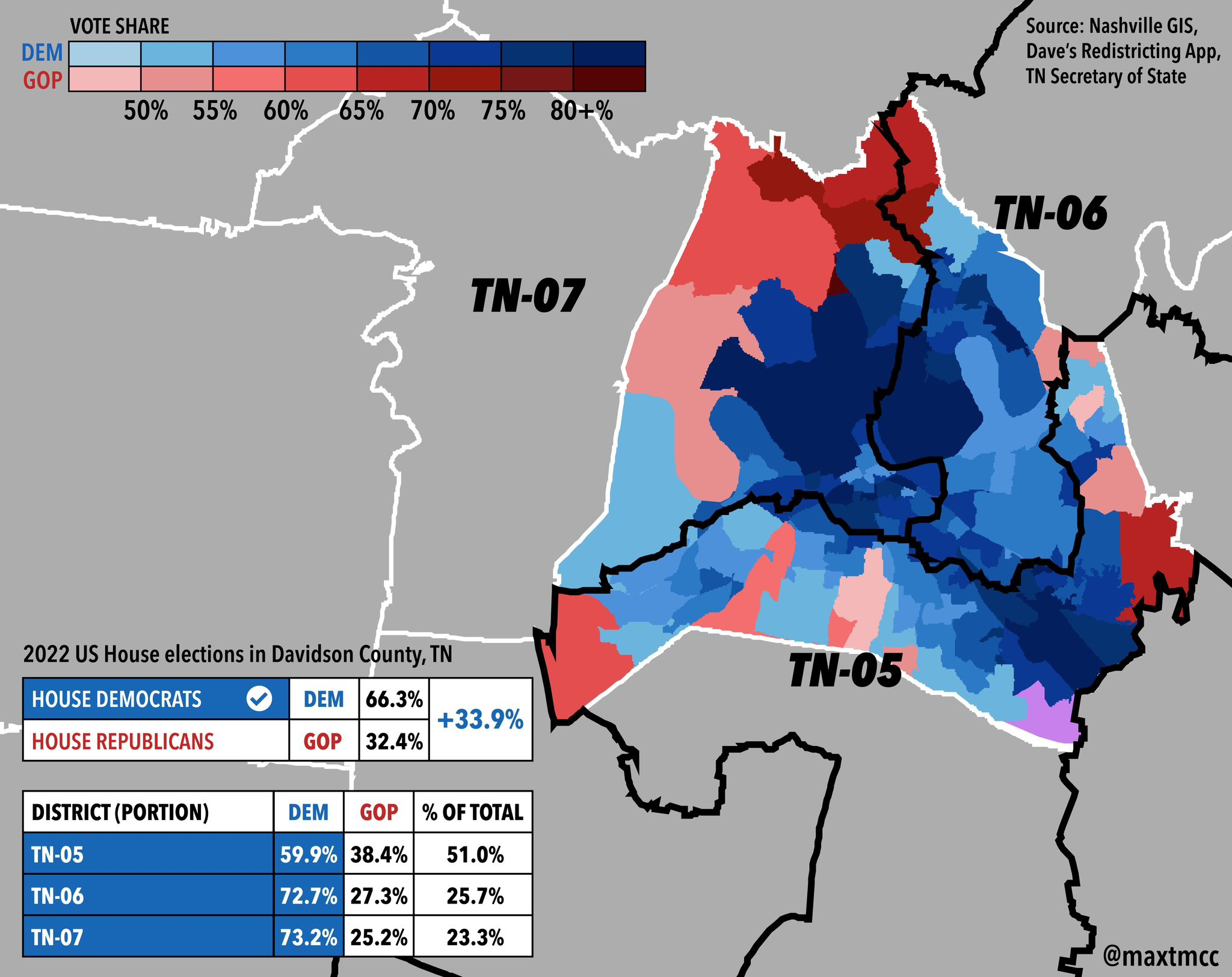
Davidson County results by precinct

District	Republican		Democratic		Others		Total		Result
District	Votes	%	Votes	%	Votes	%	Votes	%	Result
District 1	147,241	78.32%	37,049	19.71%	3,713	1.97%	188,003	100.0%	Republican hold
District 2	141,089	67.91%	66,673	32.09%	0	0.00%	207,762	100.0%	Republican hold
District 3	136,639	68.38%	60,334	30.19%	2,857	1.43%	199,830	100.0%	Republican hold
District 4	122,401	70.57%	44,648	25.74%	6,388	3.68%	173,437	100.0%	Republican hold
District 5	123,558	55.84%	93,648	42.32%	4,069	1.84%	221,275	100.0%	Republican gain
District 6	129,388	66.33%	65,675	33.67%	0	0.00%	195,063	100.0%	Republican hold
District 7	108,421	59.96%	68,973	38.14%	3,428	1.90%	180,822	100.0%	Republican hold
District 8	155,602	73.99%	51,102	24.30%	3,611	1.72%	210,315	100.0%	Republican hold
District 9	35,123	26.23%	93,800	70.04%	4,995	3.73%	133,918	100.0%	Democratic hold
Total	1,099,462	64.28%	581,902	34.02%	29,061	1.70%	1,710,425	100.0%	

Popular vote
Republican	64.28%
Democratic	34.02%
Other	1.70%

House seats
Republican	88.89%
Democratic	11.11%

== District 1 ==
2022 Tennessee's 1st congressional district election
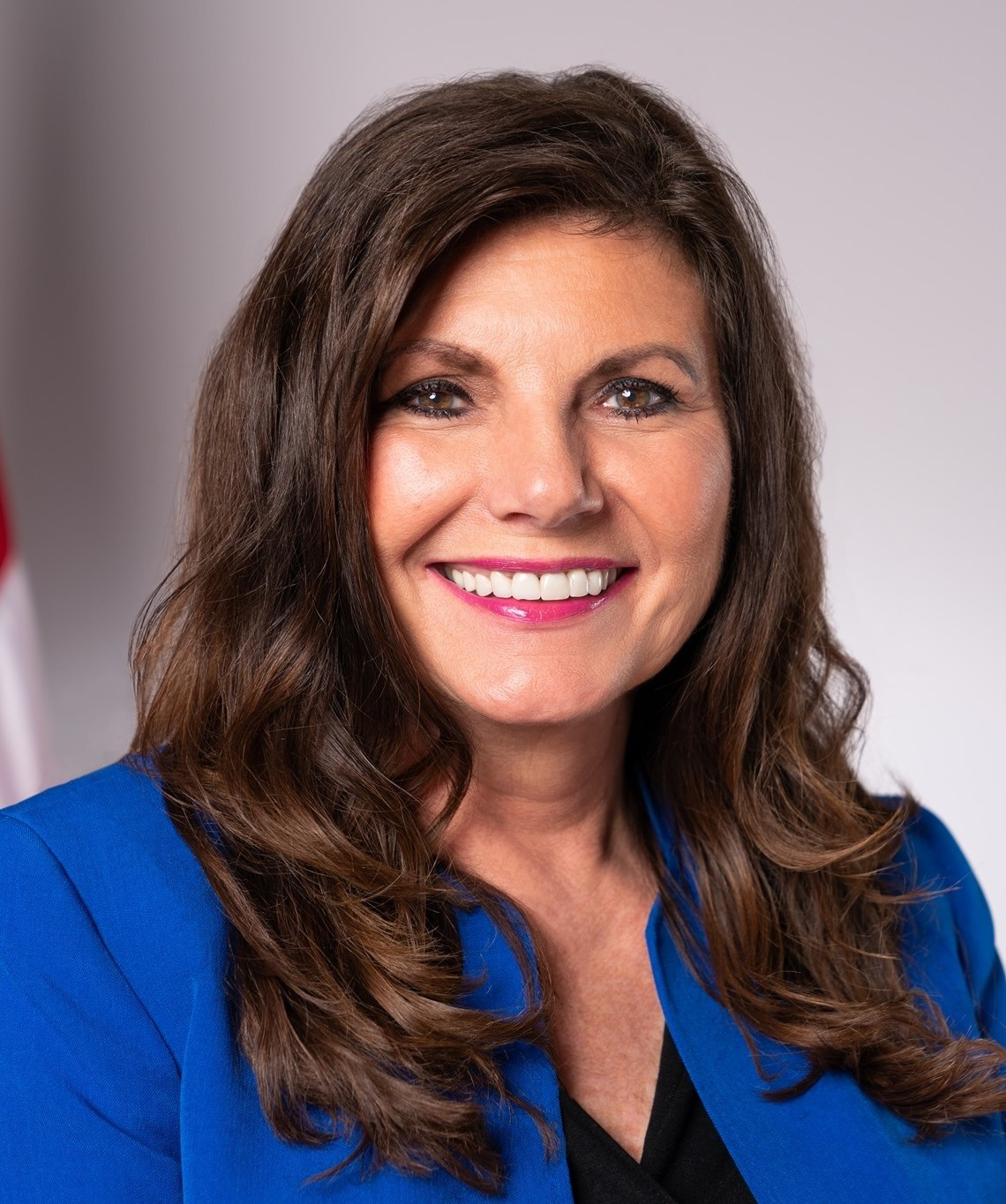

Nominee	Diana Harshbarger	Cameron Parsons
Party	Republican	Democratic
Popular vote	147,241	37,049
Percentage	78.32%	19.71%
- County results Harshbarger: 60–70% 70–80% 80–90%
U.S. Representative before election
Diana Harshbarger
Republican
Elected U.S. Representative
Diana Harshbarger
Republican

The 1st district is based in northeast Tennessee, encompassing all of Carter, Cocke, Greene, Hamblen, Hancock, Hawkins, Johnson, Sullivan, Unicoi, and Washington counties and parts of Jefferson and Sevier counties, and includes the Tri-Cities region. The district was barely impacted by the 2020 redistricting cycle. The incumbent was Republican Diana Harshbarger, who was elected with 74.7% of the vote in 2020 and won re-election in 2022.

=== Republican primary ===
==== Candidates ====
===== Nominee =====
- Diana Harshbarger, incumbent U.S. Representative (2021–present)

==== Disqualified ====
- James Andrew Greene
- Chuck Miller
- Gary Wyatt

===== Endorsements =====
Diana Harshbarger

Executive Branch officials

- Donald Trump, 45th President of the United States (2017–2021)

==== Results ====
Republican primary results
Party	Candidate	Votes	%
Republican	Diana Harshbarger (incumbent)	43,761	100.00%
Total votes		43,761	100.00%

=== Democratic primary ===
==== Candidates ====
===== Nominee =====
- Cameron Parsons, employee at Eastman Chemical Company

==== Results ====
Democratic primary results
Party	Candidate	Votes	%
Democratic	Cameron Parsons	6,099	100.00%
Total votes		6,099	100.00%

=== Independents ===
==== Candidates ====
===== Declared =====
- Richard Baker, Republican candidate for this seat in 2020
- Ahmed Makrom, nurse

=== General election ===
==== Predictions ====
Source	Ranking	As of
The Cook Political Report	Solid R	February 7, 2022
Inside Elections	Solid R	May 23, 2022
Sabato's Crystal Ball	Safe R	February 8, 2022
Politico	Solid R	April 5, 2022
RCP	Safe R	June 9, 2022
Fox News	Solid R	July 11, 2022
DDHQ	Solid R	July 20, 2022
538	Solid R	June 30, 2022
The Economist	Safe R	September 28, 2022

==== Results ====
2022 Tennessee's 1st congressional district election
Party	Candidate	Votes	%
Republican	Diana Harshbarger (incumbent)	147,241	78.32%
Democratic	Cameron Parsons	37,049	19.71%
Independent	Richard Baker	2,466	1.31%
Independent	Ahmed Makrom	1,247	0.66%
Total votes		188,003	100.00%
Republican hold			

== District 2 ==
2022 Tennessee's 2nd congressional district election
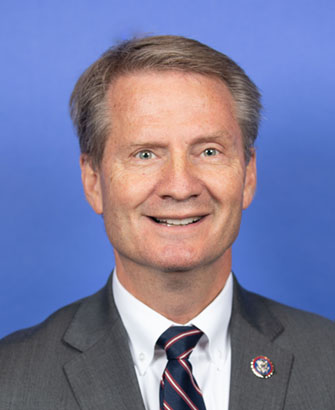

Nominee	Tim Burchett	Mark Harmon
Party	Republican	Democratic
Popular vote	141,089	66,673
Percentage	67.91%	32.09%
- County results Burchett: 60–70% 70–80% 80–90%
U.S. Representative before election
Tim Burchett
Republican
Elected U.S. Representative
Tim Burchett
Republican

The 2nd district is located in eastern Tennessee, anchored by Knoxville. The district was barely impacted by the 2020 redistricting cycle. The incumbent was Republican Tim Burchett, who was re-elected with 67.6% of the vote in 2020 and won re-election in 2022.

=== Republican primary ===
==== Nominee ====
- Tim Burchett, incumbent U.S. Representative (2019–present)

==== Results ====
Republican primary results
Party	Candidate	Votes	%
Republican	Tim Burchett (incumbent)	56,880	100.00%
Total votes		56,880	100.00%

=== Democratic primary ===
==== Candidates ====
===== Nominee =====
- Mark Harmon, professor at the University of Tennessee, former Knox County commissioner (2006–2010), and nominee for Texas's 13th congressional district in 1998

===== Disqualified =====
- Marcus Lowery

==== Endorsements ====
Mark Harmon

Labor unions

- Tennessee AFL–CIO

==== Results ====
Democratic primary results
Party	Candidate	Votes	%
Democratic	Mark Harmon	24,879	100.00%
Total votes		24,879	100.00%

=== Independents ===
==== Candidates ====
===== Disqualified =====
- Jeffrey Grunau

=== General election ===
==== Predictions ====
Source	Ranking	As of
The Cook Political Report	Solid R	February 7, 2022
Inside Elections	Solid R	May 23, 2022
Sabato's Crystal Ball	Safe R	February 8, 2022
Politico	Solid R	April 5, 2022
RCP	Safe R	June 9, 2022
Fox News	Solid R	July 11, 2022
DDHQ	Solid R	July 20, 2022
538	Solid R	June 30, 2022
The Economist	Safe R	September 28, 2022

==== Results ====
2022 Tennessee's 2nd congressional district election
Party	Candidate	Votes	%
Republican	Tim Burchett (incumbent)	141,089	67.91%
Democratic	Mark Harmon	66,673	32.09%
Total votes		207,762	100.00%
Republican hold			

== District 3 ==
2022 Tennessee's 3rd congressional district election
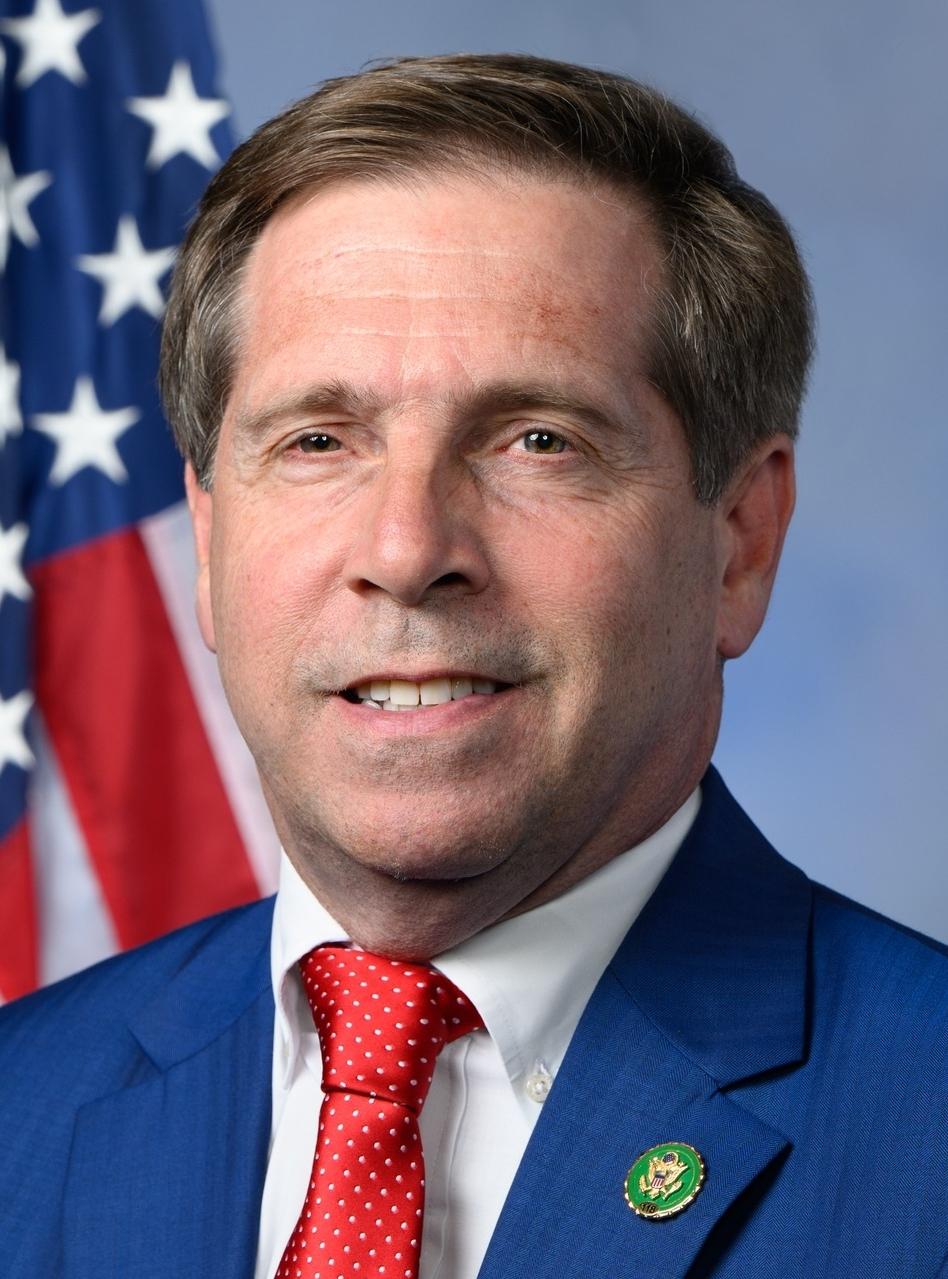

Nominee	Chuck Fleischmann	Meg Gorman
Party	Republican	Democratic
Popular vote	136,639	60,334
Percentage	68.38%	30.19%
- County results Fleischmann: 50–60% 60–70% 70–80% 80–90%
U.S. Representative before election
Chuck Fleischmann
Republican
Elected U.S. Representative
Chuck Fleischmann
Republican

The 3rd district encompasses most of the Chattanooga metro in eastern Tennessee, along with several suburban and rural areas near Knoxville and the Tri-Cities. The district was barely impacted by the 2020 redistricting cycle. However, under the new lines, the district no longer touches the border of Kentucky. The incumbent was Republican Chuck Fleischmann, who was re-elected with 67.3% of the vote in 2020 and won re-election in 2022.

=== Republican primary ===
==== Candidates ====
===== Nominee =====
- Chuck Fleischmann, incumbent U.S. Representative (2011–present)

===== Eliminated in primary =====
- Sandy Casey, Navy veteran

===== Disqualified =====
- Dewitt Ferrell
- Bradley Hayes

===== Withdrew =====
- Kenny Morgan

==== Endorsements ====
Chuck Fleischmann

U.S. Presidents

- Donald Trump, 45th President of the United States (2017–2021)

==== Results ====
Republican primary results by county: Fleischmann: 70–80%; 80–90%

Republican Primary Election
Party	Candidate	Votes	%
Republican	Chuck Fleischmann (incumbent)	52,073	79.28%
Republican	Sandy Casey	13,609	20.72%
Total votes		65,682	100.00%

=== Democratic primary ===
==== Nominee ====
- Meg Gorman, nominee for this seat in 2020

==== Results ====
Democratic Primary Election
Party	Candidate	Votes	%
Democratic	Meg Gorman	22,208	100.00%
Total votes		22,208	100.00%

=== Independents ===
==== Candidates ====
===== Declared =====
- Thomas Rumba
- Rick Tyler, white supremacist and perennial candidate (later decided to run for governor instead)

==== Disqualified ====
- Amber Hysell

=== General election ===
==== Predictions ====
Source	Ranking	As of
The Cook Political Report	Solid R	February 7, 2022
Inside Elections	Solid R	May 23, 2022
Sabato's Crystal Ball	Safe R	February 8, 2022
Politico	Solid R	April 5, 2022
RCP	Safe R	June 9, 2022
Fox News	Solid R	July 11, 2022
DDHQ	Solid R	July 20, 2022
538	Solid R	June 30, 2022
The Economist	Safe R	September 28, 2022

==== Results ====
2022 Tennessee's 3rd congressional district election
Party	Candidate	Votes	%
Republican	Chuck Fleischmann (incumbent)	136,639	68.38%
Democratic	Meg Gorman	60,334	30.19%
Independent	Rick Tyler	1,736	0.87%
Independent	Thomas Rumba	1,121	0.56%
Total votes		199,830	100.00%
Republican hold			

== District 4 ==
2022 Tennessee's 4th congressional district election
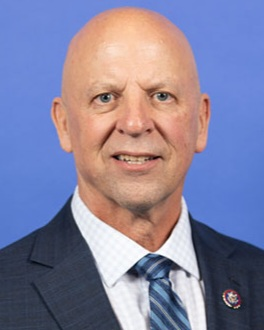

Nominee	Scott DesJarlais	Wayne Steele
Party	Republican	Democratic
Popular vote	122,401	44,648
Percentage	70.57%	25.74%
- County results DesJarlais: 60–70% 70–80% 80–90%
U.S. Representative before election
Scott DesJarlais
Republican
Elected U.S. Representative
Scott DesJarlais
Republican

The 4th district encompasses the southern part of Middle Tennessee, including Murfreesboro and Lynchburg. The district was barely impacted by the 2020 redistricting cycle, though it does take up more of the southern border of the state. The incumbent was Republican Scott DesJarlais, who was re-elected with 66.7% of the vote in 2020 and won re-election in 2022.

=== Republican primary ===
==== Candidates ====
===== Nominee =====
- Scott DesJarlais, incumbent U.S. Representative (2011–present)

===== Disqualified =====
- Charles Dean Smith

==== Results ====
Republican primary results
Party	Candidate	Votes	%
Republican	Scott DesJarlais (incumbent)	60,699	100.00%
Total votes		60,699	100.00%

=== Democratic primary ===
==== Candidates ====
===== Nominee =====
- Wayne Steele, write-in candidate for this seat in 2018

===== Eliminated in primary =====
- Arnold White

==== Results ====
Democratic primary results
Party	Candidate	Votes	%
Democratic	Wayne Steele	11,168	65.07%
Democratic	Arnold White	5,994	34.93%
Total votes		17,162	100.00%

=== Independents ===
==== Candidates ====
- Clyde Benson, veteran
- Tharon Chandler, journalist and perennial candidate
- David Jones, engineer and Libertarian activist
- Joseph Mayger
- Mike Winton, perennial candidate

=== General election ===
==== Predictions ====
Source	Ranking	As of
The Cook Political Report	Solid R	February 7, 2022
Inside Elections	Solid R	May 23, 2022
Sabato's Crystal Ball	Safe R	February 8, 2022
Politico	Solid R	April 5, 2022
RCP	Safe R	June 9, 2022
Fox News	Solid R	July 11, 2022
DDHQ	Solid R	July 20, 2022
538	Solid R	June 30, 2022
The Economist	Safe R	September 28, 2022

==== Results ====
2022 Tennessee's 4th congressional district election
Party	Candidate	Votes	%
Republican	Scott DesJarlais (incumbent)	122,401	70.57%
Democratic	Russell Steele	44,648	25.74%
Independent	Mike Winton	2,834	1.63%
Independent	Clyde Benson	1,806	1.04%
Independent	David Jones	708	0.41%
Independent	Tharon Chandler	585	0.34%
Independent	Joseph Magyer	455	0.26%
Total votes		173,437	100.00%
Republican hold			

== District 5 ==
2022 Tennessee's 5th congressional district election
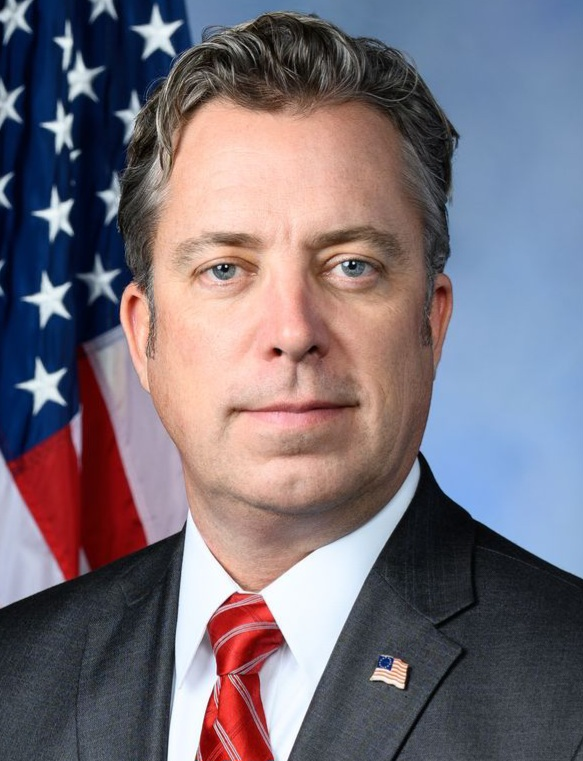

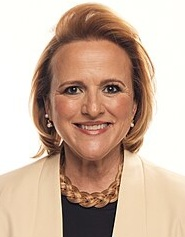
Nominee	Andy Ogles	Heidi Campbell
Party	Republican	Democratic
Popular vote	123,558	93,648
Percentage	55.84%	42.32%
- Ogles: 40–50% 50–60% 60–70% 70–80% 80–90% >90% Campbell: 50–60% 60–70% 70–80% 80–90% >90% Tie: 40–50% No data
U.S. Representative before election
Jim Cooper
Democratic
Elected U.S. Representative
Andy Ogles
Republican

The 5th district was previously centered on Nashville and the immediate surrounding suburbs, and it also used to contain Dickson and part of Cheatham County. The incumbent was Democrat Jim Cooper, who ran unopposed in 2020.

On January 25, Cooper announced he would withdraw his candidacy for re-election and refund all campaign contributions, citing the state legislature's move to split Davidson County into three congressional districts.

Under the new Republican redistricting map, the new 5th district shifted from D+7 to R+9 and contained only the southern part of Nashville, as well as portions of Wilson and Williamson Counties and the entirety of Maury, Lewis, and Marshall Counties. The 6th and 7th districts absorbed the eastern and western parts of Davidson county, respectively.

In the general election, Republican Andy Ogles defeated Democratic challenger Heidi Campbell. With Ogles' victory, he became the first Republican in 147 years to represent Nashville in the House of Representatives.

Heidi Campbell performed strongest in the district's portion of Davidson County, where she swept nearly every precinct. This success included winning the traditionally Republican stronghold of Forest Hills and maintaining comfortable margins in and around her hometown of Oak Hill, where she previously served as Vice Mayor and the first female Mayor. These areas largely overlap with Tennessee Senate District 20, which Campbell had represented since 2020.

=== Democratic primary ===
==== Candidates ====
===== Nominee =====
- Heidi Campbell, state senator

===== Disqualified =====
- Justicia Rizzo

===== Withdrawn =====
- Jim Cooper, incumbent U.S. Representative (2003–2023)
- Odessa Kelly, executive director of Stand Up Nashville (candidate in the 7th district)

==== Endorsements ====
Odessa Kelly (withdrew)

Local officials

- Sean Parker, District 5 Metro Councilman
- Delisha Porterfield, District 29 Metro Councilwoman

Organizations

- Brand New Congress
- Indivisible
- Justice Democrats
- Working Families Party

Labor unions

- SEIU (Local 109 and National)
Heidi Campbell

Federal officials

- Jim Cooper, incumbent U.S. Representative (2003–2023)

State officials

- Phil Bredesen, 48th governor of Tennessee (2003–2011)
- Randy Stamps, state representative (199?–1999) (Republican)

Labor unions

- Communication Workers of America
- Tennessee AFL–CIO

Organizations

- League of Conservation Voters
- National Women's Political Caucus
- Sierra Club

Labor unions

- SEIU (Local 205)

Individuals

- Devon Gilfillian, singer
- Stella Parton, singer
- Lucinda Williams, singer

==== Results ====
Democratic primary results
Party	Candidate	Votes	%
Democratic	Heidi Campbell	30,830	100.00%
Total votes		30,830	100.00%

=== Republican primary ===
Early in the cycle, the Tennessee Republican Party’s state executive committee removed Donald Trump-endorsed Morgan Ortagus, along with Robby Starbuck and Baxter Lee, from the ballot. The party invoked internal bylaws requiring candidates to have voted in three of the last four statewide Republican primaries, a move widely criticized by some as an effort by the local "establishment" to narrow the field. Andy Ogles emerged as the winner with 35.4% of the vote, defeating former State House Speaker Beth Harwell and retired Brigadier General Kurt Winstead.

==== Candidates ====
===== Nominee =====
- Andy Ogles, mayor of Maury County

===== Eliminated in primary =====
- Geni Batchelor, realtor
- Jeff Beierlein, healthcare executive
- Natisha Brooks, homeschool operator and owner
- Beth Harwell, former Speaker of the Tennessee House of Representatives (2011–2019), former state representative (1989–2019), and candidate for governor of Tennessee in 2018
- Timothy Bruce Lee, Nashville Fire Department paramedic
- Robby "Starbuck" Newsom, film director (write-in)
- Stewart Parks, realtor
- Kurt Winstead, retired national guard brigadier general
- Tres Wittum, policy and research analyst for state senator Bo Watson

===== Disqualified =====
- Baxter Lee, entrepreneur
- Morgan Ortagus, former Spokesperson for the United States Department of State (2019–2021)

===== Withdrew =====
- Quincy McKnight, businessman and Republican primary candidate for Tennessee State Senate District 21 (candidate for Nashville mayor)

===== Declined =====
- Manny Sethi, orthopedic surgeon and candidate for U.S. Senate in 2020

==== Endorsements ====
Beth Harwell

State legislators

- Frank Niceley, state senator from the 8th district (2013–2025)

Organizations

- Maggie's List
Quincy McKnight (withdrew)

State legislators

- Vernon Jones, former Democratic Georgia state representative (1993–2001, 2017–2021) and Chief Executive Officer of DeKalb County (2001–2009)

Organizations

- Frederick Douglass Foundation
Morgan Ortagus (disqualified)

Executive Branch officials

- Donald Trump, 45th President of the United States (2017–2021)
Robby Starbuck (disqualified)

U.S. Senators

- Rand Paul, U.S. Senator from Kentucky (2011–present)

U.S. Representatives

- Madison Cawthorn, U.S. Representative for NC-11 (2021–2023)
- Marjorie Taylor Greene, U.S. Representative for GA-14 (2021–2026)

Individuals

- Sebastian Gorka, former Deputy Assistant to the President
- Kari Lake, former television news journalist and candidate in the 2022 Arizona gubernatorial election
- Candace Owens, conservative author and activist
Andy Ogles

Organizations

- Club for Growth
- Veterans for America First

Individuals

- Dave Ramsey, conservative talk radio host
Kurt Winstead

Executive Branch officials

- Morgan Ortagus, former Spokesperson for the United States Department of State (2019–2021) and disqualified candidate for this seat

==== Polling ====
Poll source	Date(s) administered	Sample size (Note: Key: A – all adults RV – registered voters LV – likely voters V – unclear)	Margin of error	Jeff Beierlein	Beth Harwell	Timothy Lee	Andy Ogles	Kurt Winstead	Other	Undecided
Spry Strategies (R) (Note: This poll was sponsored by Winstead's campaign)	July 2022	300 (LV)	± 5.7%	9%	22%	10%	15%	20%	–	24%
1892 Polling (R) (Note: This poll was sponsored by Harwell's campaign)	July 2022	400 (LV)	± 4.9%	3%	24%	–	30%	13%	9%	21%

==== Results ====
Republican primary results by county: Ogles: 20–30%; 30–40%; 40–50%; 50–60%; Harwell: 30–40%

Republican primary results
Party	Candidate	Votes	%
Republican	Andy Ogles	21,325	35.40%
Republican	Beth Harwell	15,021	24.93%
Republican	Kurt Winstead	12,721	21.12%
Republican	Jeff Beierlien	4,093	6.79%
Republican	Robby "Starbuck" Newsom (write-in)	2,492	4.14%
Republican	Natisha Brooks	1,747	2.90%
Republican	Geni Batchelor	1,017	1.69%
Republican	Timothy Bruce Lee	845	1.40%
Republican	Stewart T. Parks	586	0.97%
Republican	Tres Wittum	398	0.66%
Total votes		60,245	100.00%

=== Independent Candidates ===
==== Candidates ====
===== Declared =====
- Derrick Brantley, business development consultant
- Daniel Cooper, former Maury County Commissioner
- Rick Shannon, veteran, author, pastor, and business owner

=== General election ===
==== Predictions ====
Source	Ranking	As of
The Cook Political Report	Likely R (flip)	October 14, 2022
Inside Elections	Likely R (flip)	May 23, 2022
Sabato's Crystal Ball	Safe R (flip)	February 8, 2022
Politico	Likely R (flip)	April 5, 2022
RCP	Likely R (flip)	June 9, 2022
Fox News	Solid R (flip)	July 11, 2022
DDHQ	Likely R (flip)	July 20, 2022
538	Solid R (flip)	June 30, 2022
The Economist	Likely R (flip)	September 28, 2022

==== Polling ====
Poll source	Date(s) administered	Sample size	Margin of error	Heidi Campbell (D)	Andy Ogles (R)	Undecided
Frederick Polls (D) (Note: This poll was sponsored by Campbell's campaign)	August 12–17, 2022	1,622 (LV)	± 2.4%	51%	48%	1%

==== Results ====
The results were controversial, mainly revolving around the state's gerrymandering, which many experts believed was what allowed Ogles to win. There were also some controversies around Ogles himself, who later came under fire over disputes involving his career and education.

2022 Tennessee's 5th congressional district election
Party	Candidate	Votes	%
Republican	Andy Ogles	123,558	55.84%
Democratic	Heidi Campbell	93,648	42.32%
Independent	Derrick Brantley	2,090	0.94%
Independent	Daniel Cooper	1,132	0.51%
Independent	Rich Shannon	847	0.38%
Total votes		221,275	100.00%
Republican gain from Democratic			

==== By county ====
County	Andy Ogles Republican		Heidi Campbell Democratic		Other votes		Total votes
County	%	#	%	#	%	#	Total votes
Davidson	38.38%	34,353	59.91%	53,627	1.71%	1,535	89,515
Lewis	78.91%	2,671	19.32%	654	1.77%	60	3,385
Marshall	74.76%	6,488	23.19%	2,012	2.05	178	8,678
Maury	68.17%	20,687	29.29%	8,888	2.54%	772	30,347
Williamson	66.38%	37,268	32.10%	18,020	1.52%	852	56,140
Wilson	66.52%	22,091	31.46%	10,447	2.02%	672	33,210

== District 6 ==
2022 Tennessee's 6th congressional district election
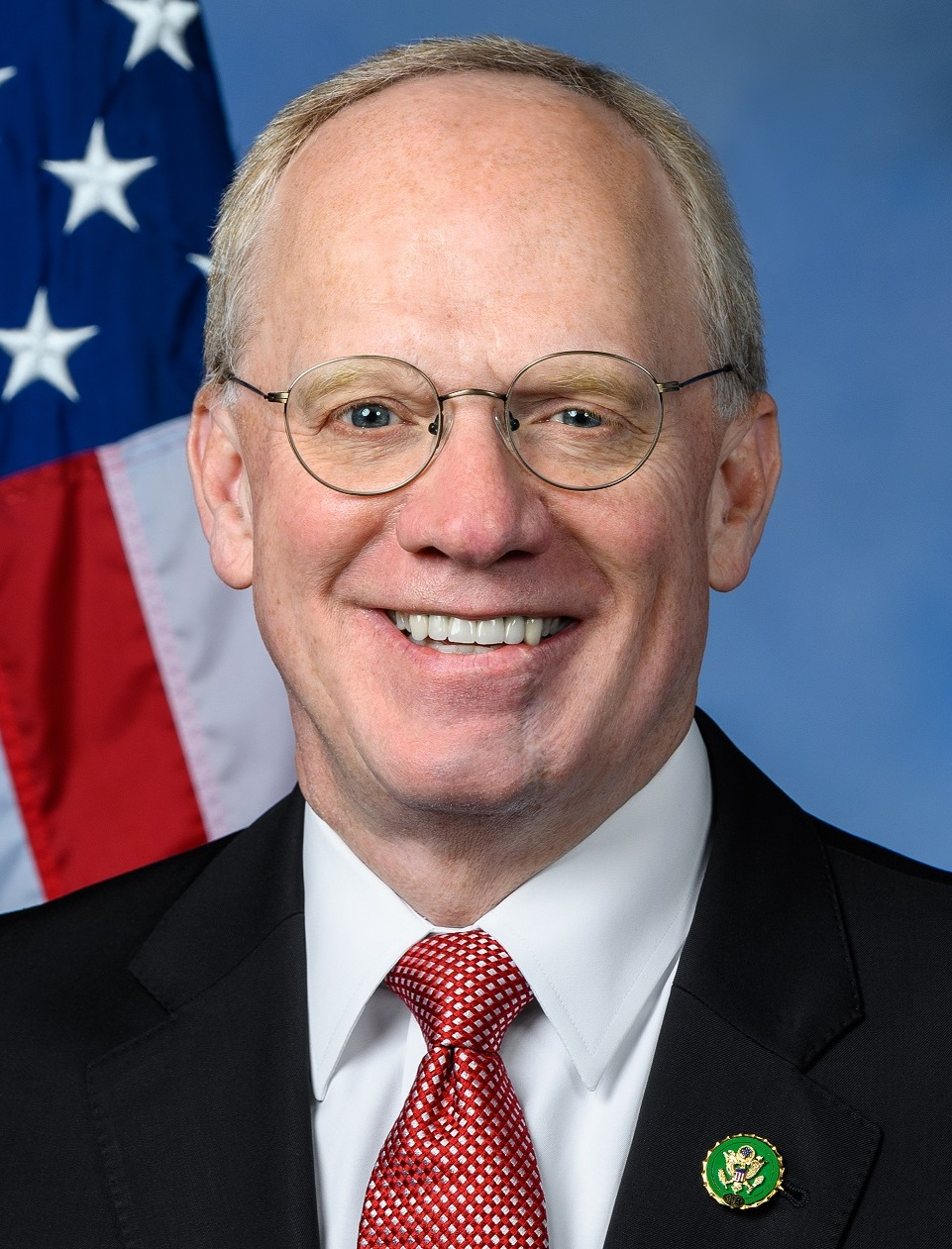

Nominee	John Rose	Randal Cooper
Party	Republican	Democratic
Popular vote	129,388	65,675
Percentage	66.33%	33.67%
- County results Rose: 70–80% 80–90% Cooper: 70–80%
U.S. Representative before election
John Rose
Republican
Elected U.S. Representative
John Rose
Republican

The 6th district encompasses the eastern portions and suburbs of Nashville and extends across northern Middle Tennessee. It includes the cities of Hendersonville and Gallatin, as well as the eastern portion of Lebanon. The district continues eastward across the Cumberland Plateau, including the regional centers of Cookeville and Crossville, and reaches as far as Scott County, where East Tennessee begins.

After redistricting, it absorbed the western portion of Davidson County. The incumbent was Republican John Rose, who was re-elected with 73.7% of the vote in 2020 and won re-election in 2022.

=== Republican primary ===
==== Candidates ====
===== Nominee =====
- John Rose, incumbent U.S. Representative (2019–2027)

==== Results ====
Republican primary results
Party	Candidate	Votes	%
Republican	John Rose (incumbent)	57,162	100.00%
Total votes		57,162	100.00%

=== Democratic primary ===
==== Candidates ====
===== Nominee =====
- Randal Cooper

===== Eliminated in primary =====
- Clay Faircloth, pastor

==== Results ====
Democratic primary results by county: Cooper: 70–80%; 80–90%; >90%

Democratic primary results
Party	Candidate	Votes	%
Democratic	Randal Cooper	17,332	74.70%
Democratic	Clay Faircloth	5,870	25.30%
Total votes		23,202	100.00%

=== General election ===
==== Predictions ====
Source	Ranking	As of
The Cook Political Report	Solid R	February 7, 2022
Inside Elections	Solid R	May 23, 2022
Sabato's Crystal Ball	Safe R	February 8, 2022
Politico	Solid R	April 5, 2022
RCP	Safe R	June 9, 2022
Fox News	Solid R	July 11, 2022
DDHQ	Solid R	July 20, 2022
538	Solid R	June 30, 2022
The Economist	Safe R	September 28, 2022

==== Results ====
2022 Tennessee's 6th congressional district election
Party	Candidate	Votes	%
Republican	John Rose (incumbent)	129,388	66.33%
Democratic	Randal Cooper	65,675	33.67%
Total votes		195,063	100.00%
Republican hold			

== District 7 ==
2022 Tennessee's 7th congressional district election
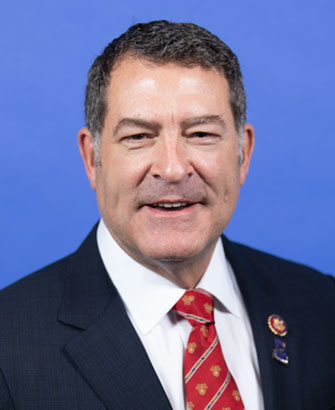

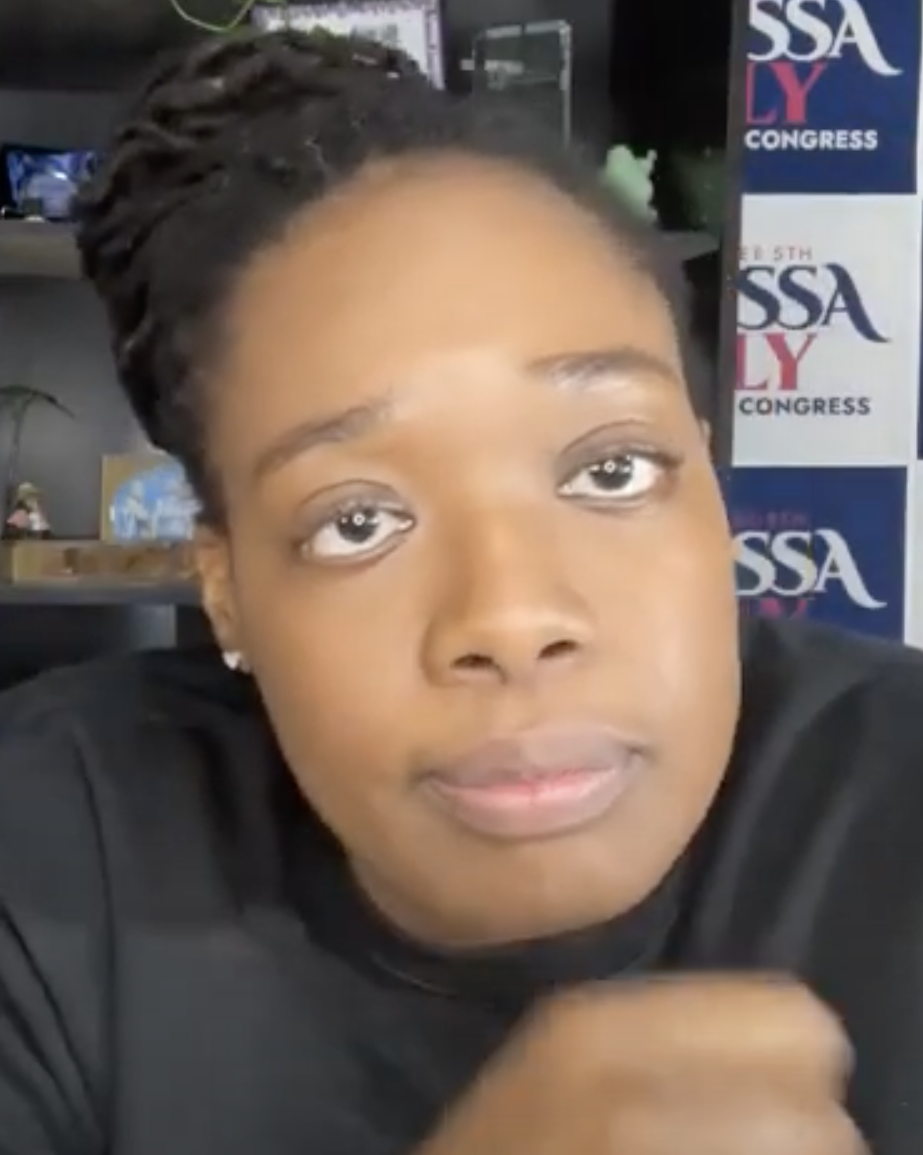
Nominee	Mark Green	Odessa Kelly
Party	Republican	Democratic
Popular vote	108,421	68,973
Percentage	59.96%	38.14%
- Green: 40–50% 50–60% 60–70% 70–80% 80–90% >90% Kelly: 40–50% 50–60% 60–70% 70–80% 80–90% >90% No data
U.S. Representative before election
Mark Green
Republican
Elected U.S. Representative
Mark Green
Republican

The 7th district is centered in Middle Tennessee, anchored by significant portions of Nashville and its western suburbs. The district includes most of Franklin as well as the western half of Williamson County, along with nearby communities such as Ashland City, Pleasant View, Dickson, Springfield, and part of White House.

To the northwest, the district prominently includes Clarksville, one of the state's largest cities anchored by Fort Campbell.

Beyond that the district stretches southward to the Alabama border, encompassing a large swath of predominantly rural counties.

The incumbent was Republican Mark Green, who was re-elected with 69.9% of the vote in 2020 and won re-election in 2022. Green's district was significantly impacted by redistricting, as he now represented a more central part of Tennessee. The 8th district absorbed most of Green's constituents in the western portion of the state.

=== Republican primary ===
==== Candidates ====
===== Nominee =====
- Mark Green, incumbent U.S. Representative (2019–2025)

==== Endorsements ====
Mark Green

Federal officials

- Donald Trump, former president of the United States

==== Results ====
Republican primary results
Party	Candidate	Votes	%
Republican	Mark Green (incumbent)	48,968	100.00%
Total votes		48,968	100.00%

=== Democratic primary ===
==== Candidates ====
===== Nominee =====
- Odessa Kelly, executive director of Stand Up Nashville

==== Endorsements ====
Odessa Kelly

Local officials

- Erica Gilmore, District 19 Metro Councilwoman and daughter of state senator Brenda Gilmore
- Sean Parker, District 5 Metro Councilman
- Delisha Porterfield, District 29 Metro Councilwoman
- Zulfat Suara, Metro Councilwoman at-large

Organizations

- Brand New Congress
- Indivisible
- Justice Democrats
- National Women's Political Caucus
- Working Families Party

Labor unions

- Communication Workers of America
- SEIU (Local 109 and National)
- Tennessee AFL–CIO

==== Results ====
Democratic Party Results
Party	Candidate	Votes	%
Democratic	Odessa Kelly	24,854	100.00%
Total votes		24,854	100.00%

=== Independents ===
==== Candidates ====
===== Declared =====
- Steven Hooper, candidate for U.S. Senate in 2020

=== General election ===
==== Predictions ====
Source	Ranking	As of
The Cook Political Report	Solid R	February 7, 2022
Inside Elections	Solid R	May 23, 2022
Sabato's Crystal Ball	Safe R	February 8, 2022
Politico	Solid R	April 5, 2022
RCP	Safe R	June 9, 2022
Fox News	Solid R	July 11, 2022
DDHQ	Solid R	July 20, 2022
538	Solid R	June 30, 2022
The Economist	Safe R	September 28, 2022

==== Results ====
Despite Green's comfortable win, with only 60% of the vote received, this was the worst he had performed since his 2018 election as a result of gerrymandering, where the new district included part of Davidson County.

2022 Tennessee's 7th congressional district election
Party	Candidate	Votes	%
Republican	Mark Green (incumbent)	108,421	59.96%
Democratic	Odessa Kelly	68,973	38.14%
Independent	Steven J. Hooper	3,428	1.90%
Total votes		180,822	100.00%
Republican hold			

==== By county ====
County	Mark Green Republican		Odessa Kelly Democratic		Other votes		Total votes
County	%	#	%	#	%	#	Total votes
Benton	80.52%	2,236	17.68%	491	1.80%	50	2,777
Cheatham	71.70%	8,342	26.69%	3,105	1.62%	188	11,535
Davidson	25.19%	10,325	73.23%	30,013	1.57%	645	40,983
Decatur	82.40%	2,696	15.92%	521	1.68%	55	3,272
Dickson	74.37%	9,918	23.54%	3,139	2.09%	279	13,057
Hickman	79.32%	4,571	19.24%	1,109	1.44%	83	5,763
Houston	76.66%	1,872	21.01%	513	4.18%	186	2,471
Humphreys	75.49%	3,360	20.33%	905	1.64%	87	4,352
Montgomery	60.55%	24,486	37.25%	15,064	2.20%	890	40,440
Perry	81.61%	1,518	17.04%	317	1.34%	29	1,864
Robertson	76.40%	13,638	21.53%	3,843	2.07%	369	17,850
Stewart	80.83%	3,124	16.07%	621	3.10%	120	3,865
Wayne	87.74%	3,042	10.67%	370	1.59%	55	3,467
Williamson	67.27%	19,293	31.25%	8,962	1.49%	426	28,681

== District 8 ==
2022 Tennessee's 8th congressional district election
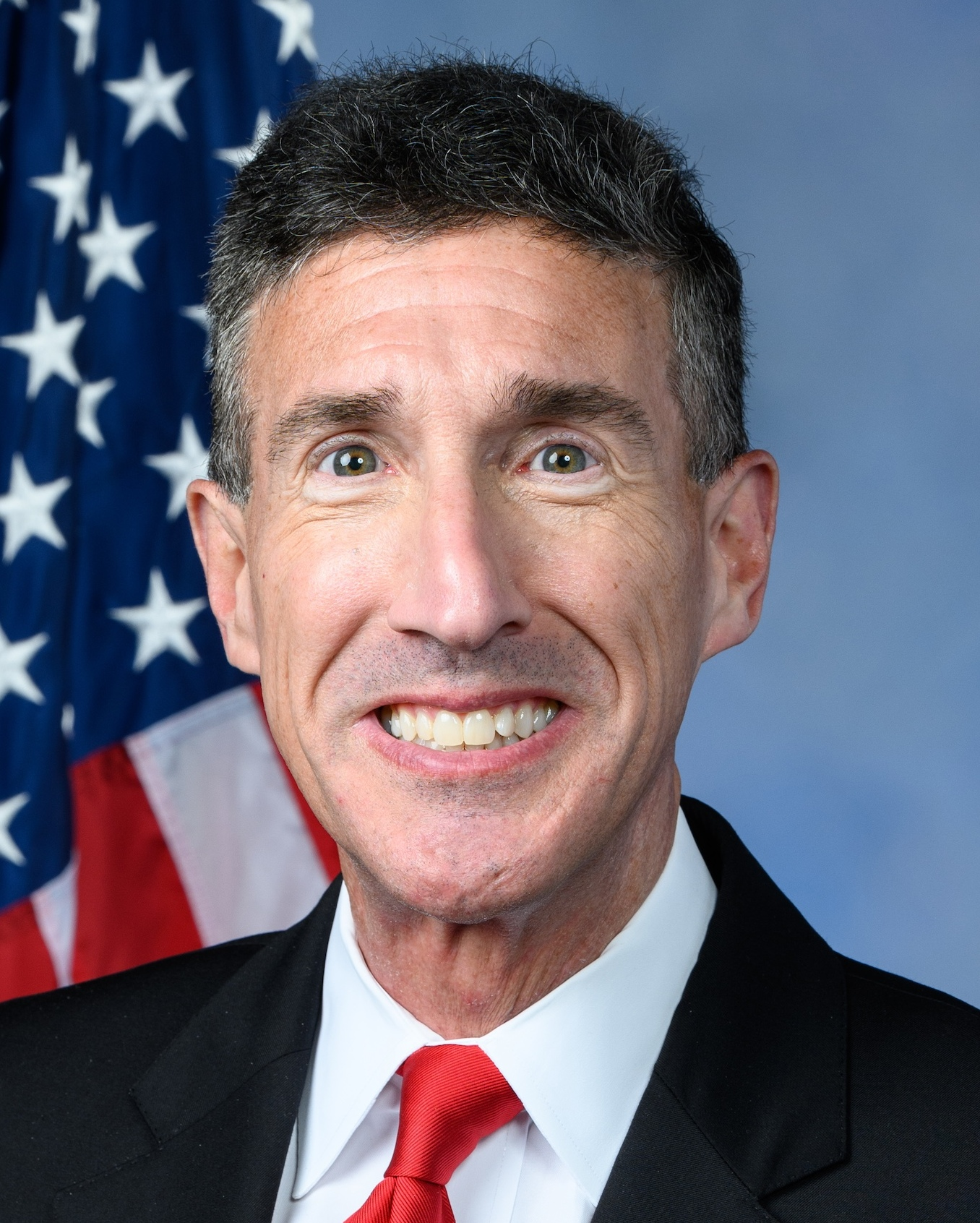

Nominee	David Kustoff	Lynnette Williams
Party	Republican	Democratic
Popular vote	155,602	51,102
Percentage	73.99%	24.30%
- County results Kustoff: 50–60% 60–70% 70–80% 80–90%
U.S. Representative before election
David Kustoff
Republican
Elected U.S. Representative
David Kustoff
Republican

The 8th district encompasses rural West Tennessee as well as taking in the eastern suburbs of Memphis, including Bartlett, Lakeland, Germantown, and Collierville, as well as the cities of Jackson, Paris, and Dyersburg. After redistricting, it absorbed much of the 7th district's Western state territory. The incumbent was Republican David Kustoff, who was re-elected with 68.5% of the vote in 2020 and re-elected in 2022.

=== Republican primary ===
==== Candidates ====
===== Nominee =====
- David Kustoff, incumbent U.S. Representative (2017–present)

===== Eliminated in primary =====
- Danny Ray Bridger Jr.
- Gary Clouse, therapist
- Bob Hendry, former Marine Corps infantry officer

==== Results ====
Republican primary results by county: Kustoff: 50–60%; 70–80%; 80–90%; >90%

Republican primary results
Party	Candidate	Votes	%
Republican	David Kustoff (incumbent)	69,538	83.73%
Republican	Bob Hendry	6,990	8.42%
Republican	Danny Ray Bridger Jr.	4,233	5.10%
Republican	Gary Clouse	2,291	2.76%
Total votes		83,052	100.00%

=== Democratic primary ===
==== Candidates ====
===== Nominee =====
- Lynnette Williams, perennial candidate

===== Eliminated in primary =====
- Tim McDonald

==== Results ====
Democratic primary results by county: Williams: 50–60%; 60–70%; 70–80%; McDonald: 50–60%

Democratic primary results
Party	Candidate	Votes	%
Democratic	Lynnette Williams	15,819	63.26%
Democratic	Tim McDonald	9,187	36.74%
Total votes		25,006	100.00%

=== Independents ===
==== Candidates ====
- James Hart, white supremacist, segregationist activist, realtor, perennial candidate, and Republican nominee for this district in 2004
- Ronnie Henley, perennial candidate

=== General election ===
==== Predictions ====
Source	Ranking	As of
The Cook Political Report	Solid R	February 7, 2022
Inside Elections	Solid R	May 23, 2022
Sabato's Crystal Ball	Safe R	February 8, 2022
Politico	Solid R	April 5, 2022
RCP	Safe R	June 9, 2022
Fox News	Solid R	July 11, 2022
DDHQ	Solid R	July 20, 2022
538	Solid R	June 30, 2022
The Economist	Safe R	September 28, 2022

==== Results ====
2022 Tennessee's 8th congressional district election
Party	Candidate	Votes	%
Republican	David Kustoff (incumbent)	155,602	73.99%
Democratic	Lynnette Williams	51,102	24.30%
Independent	James Hart	2,541	1.21%
Independent	Ronnie Henley	1,070	0.51%
Total votes		210,315	100.00%
Republican hold			

==== By county ====
County	David Kustoff Republican		Lynnette Williams Democratic		Other votes		Total votes
County	%	#	%	#	%	#	Total votes
Benton	77.40%	993	19.10%	245	3.51%	45	1,283
Carroll	80.49%	5,707	17.01%	1,206	2.75%	177	7,090
Chester	84.66%	3,764	13.74%	611	1.60%	71	4,446
Crockett	82.85%	2,662	15.59%	501	1.01%	50	3,213
Dyer	82.81%	6,784	15.39%	1,261	1.79%	147	8,192
Fayette	76.13%	10,693	22.42%	3,149	1.45%	203	14,045
Gibson	78.55%	9,619	19.65%	2,406	1.80%	110	12,135
Hardeman	62.96%	3,331	35.40%	1,873	1.64%	87	5,291
Hardin	86.70%	5,515	12.29%	782	1.01%	64	6,361
Haywood	50.66%	1,968	47.90%	1,861	1.44%	56	3,885
Henderson	86.18%	5,573	12.48%	807	1.35%	87	6,467
Henry	76.83%	6,408	18.45%	1,539	4.72%	394	8,341
Lake	77.59%	862	19.62%	218	2.79%	31	1,111
Lauderdale	69.81%	3,258	27.75%	1,295	2.44%	114	4,667
Madison	63.53%	15,076	34.69%	8,233	1.78%	423	23,732
McNairy	83.77%	5,751	14.41%	989	1.82%	125	6,865
Obion	84.16%	6,476	14.62%	1,125	1.22%	94	7,695
Shelby	70.04%	48,852	28.68%	20,005	1.28%	891	69,748
Tipton	76.59%	5,812	21.01%	1,594	2.40%	182	7,588
Weakley	80.72%	6,498	17.42%	1,402	1.86%	150	8,050

==== Counties that flipped from Democratic to Republican ====
- Haywood (largest city: Brownsville)

== District 9 ==
2022 Tennessee's 9th congressional district election
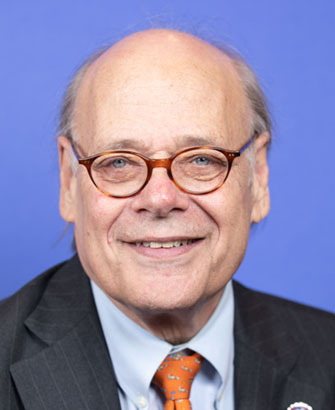

Nominee	Steve Cohen	Charlotte Bergmann
Party	Democratic	Republican
Popular vote	93,800	35,123
Percentage	70.04%	26.23%
- County results Cohen: 70–80% Bergmann: 70–80%
U.S. Representative before election
Steve Cohen
Democratic
Elected U.S. Representative
Steve Cohen
Democratic

The 9th district is based in Memphis. Redistricting left the 9th district intact, but it moved from having a 53% Democratic-leaning seat to a 43% Democratic-leaning seat after taking on some Republican-leaning suburbs and Half of Tipton County. The incumbent was Democrat Steve Cohen, who was re-elected with 77.4% of the vote in 2020 and re-elected in 2022.

=== Democratic primary ===
==== Candidates ====
===== Nominee =====
- Steve Cohen, incumbent U.S. Representative (2007–present)

===== Eliminated in primary =====
- M. Latroy Alexandria-Williams, perennial candidate

==== Endorsements ====
Steve Cohen

Organizations

- Feminist Majority PAC
- Sierra Club

Labor unions

- Tennessee AFL–CIO

==== Results ====
Democratic primary results by county: Cohen: 80–90%

Democratic primary results
Party	Candidate	Votes	%
Democratic	Steve Cohen (incumbent)	62,055	88.02%
Democratic	M. Latory Alexandria-Williams	8,449	11.98%
Total votes		70,504	100.00%

=== Republican primary ===
==== Candidates ====
===== Nominee =====
- Charlotte Bergmann, candidate for this seat in 2012, 2014, and 2020

===== Eliminated in primary =====
- Leo AwGoWhat, perennial candidate
- Brown Dudley

==== Results ====
Republican primary results by county: Bergmann: 40–50%; 50–60%

Republican primary results
Party	Candidate	Votes	%
Republican	Charlotte Bergmann	10,380	51.54%
Republican	Brown Dudley	8,760	43.50%
Republican	Leo AwGoWhat	1,000	4.97%
Total votes		20,140	100.00%

=== Independents ===
==== Candidates ====
===== Declared =====
- Dennis Clark, candidate for this seat in 2020
- Paul Cook, candidate for this seat in 2014 and 2016
- George Flinn, former Shelby County Commissioner and perennial candidate

=== General election ===
==== Predictions ====
Source	Ranking	As of
The Cook Political Report	Solid D	February 7, 2022
Inside Elections	Solid D	May 23, 2022
Sabato's Crystal Ball	Safe D	February 8, 2022
Politico	Solid D	April 5, 2022
RCP	Safe D	June 9, 2022
Fox News	Solid D	July 11, 2022
DDHQ	Solid D	July 20, 2022
538	Solid D	June 30, 2022
The Economist	Safe D	September 28, 2022

==== Results ====
2022 Tennessee's 9th congressional district election
Party	Candidate	Votes	%
Democratic	Steve Cohen (incumbent)	93,800	70.04%
Republican	Charlotte Bergmann	35,123	26.23%
Independent	George Flinn	3,349	2.50%
Independent	Dennis Clark	1,160	0.87%
Independent	Paul Cook	485	0.36%
Write-in		1	0.00%
Total votes		133,918	100.00%
Democratic hold			

== See also ==
- Elections in Tennessee
- Political party strength in Tennessee
- Tennessee Democratic Party
- Tennessee Republican Party
- Government of Tennessee
- 2022 Tennessee gubernatorial election
- 2022 Tennessee elections
- 2022 United States elections

== Notes ==
Partisan clients
