= Steven Dickerson =

American politician

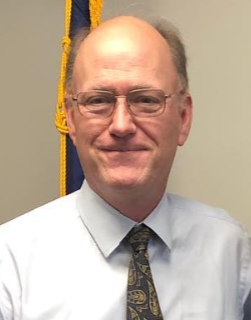
- Dickerson in 2019

Member of the Tennessee Senate from the 20th district
- In office January 8, 2013 – November 3, 2020
- Preceded by: Joe M. Haynes
- Succeeded by: Heidi Campbell

Personal details
- Party: Republican
- Education: Sewanee: The University of the South (BA); Wake Forest School of Medicine (MD)
- Profession: Physician

Steven Dickerson is an American politician and a former Republican member of the Tennessee Senate, representing District 20 from January 8, 2013 until November 3, 2020.

== Education ==
Dickerson earned his BA in history from Sewanee: The University of the South and his MD from Wake Forest School of Medicine.

== Elections ==
- 2020 Ran unopposed in the August 6, 2020, Republican primary. Lost to Heidi Campbell in the November 3, 2020, general election 54,399 (48.3%) to 58,101 (51.7%).
- 2016 Defeated Ron McDow in Republican primary winning 5,222 (60%) to 3,490 (40%). Defeated Erin Coleman in the general election winning 52,966 (56%) to 41,172 (44%).
- 2012 Redistricted to District 20, and with incumbent Democratic Senator Joe M. Haynes retiring and leaving the seat open, Dickerson ran in the three-way August 2, 2012 Republican primary, winning with 3,921 votes (48.5%), and won the November 6, 2012 general election with 46,254 votes (54.1%) against Democratic nominee Phillip North.
- 2010 Dickerson, initially to challenge District 21 incumbent Democratic Senator Douglas Henry, ran in the August 5, 2010 Republican primary, winning with 5,662 votes (56.6%), but lost the November 2, 2010 general election to Senator Henry.

== Legislative history ==
Senator Dickerson sponsored legislation to allow for the use of medical cannabis. Dickerson's bill allowing for "behind the counter" access to hormonal contraceptives made Tennessee only the third state to have a similar law enacted. Additionally, Dickerson sponsored and passed legislation allowing for syringe exchange programs.

== Medicare and Medicaid fraud lawsuit ==
In July 2019, Senator Dickerson, along with a now-defunct company he co-owned, Comprehensive Pain Specialists and other defendants, were sued by the federal government and the state of Tennessee for allegedly engaging in a fraudulent scheme to bilk government healthcare programs, including Medicare, Medicaid, and Tricare, for millions of dollars by billing the government for unnecessary and expensive toxicology tests and via other schemes.
