= Heidi Campbell (politician) =

American politician

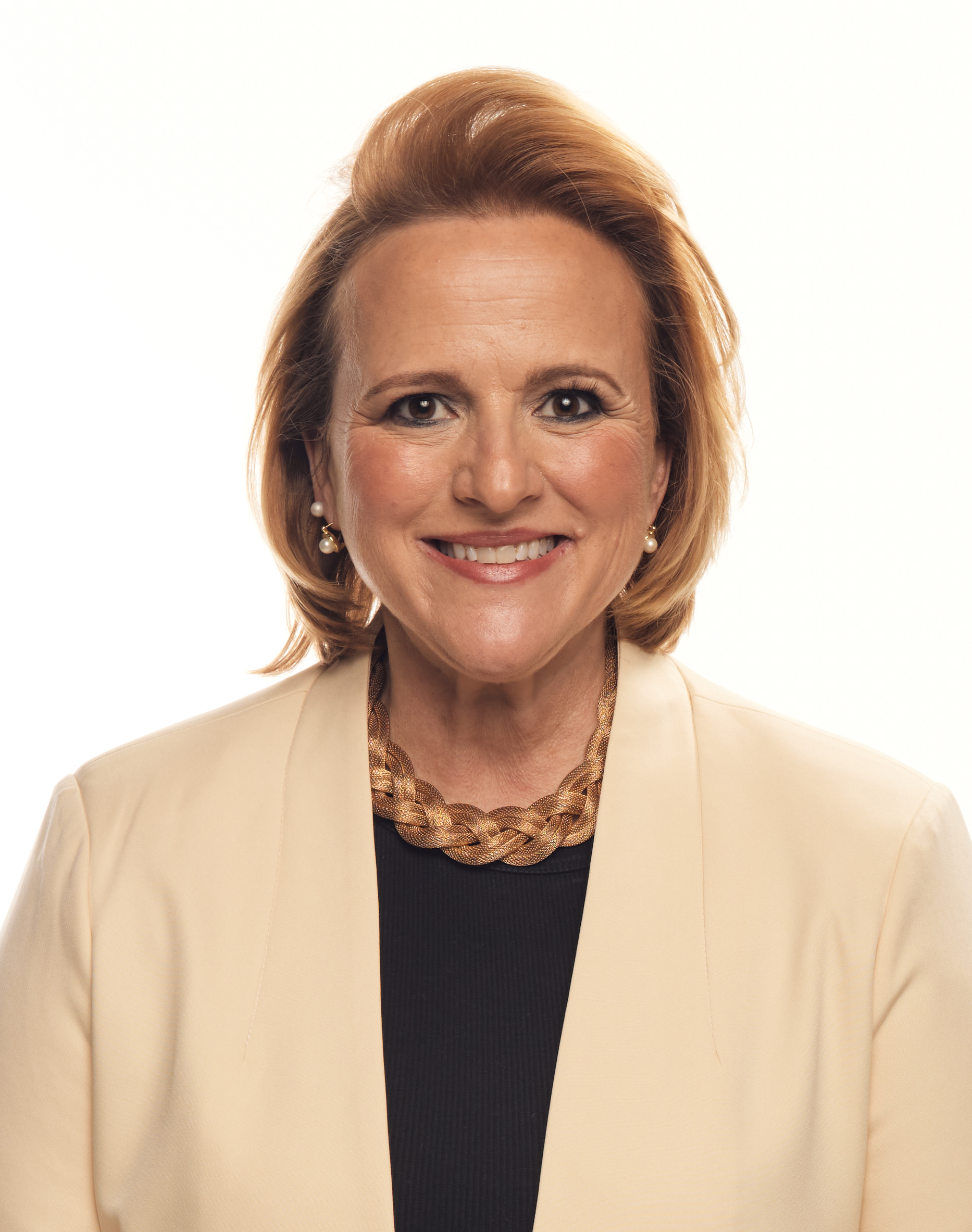
- Campbell in 2023

Member of the Tennessee Senate from the 20th district
- Incumbent
- Assumed office January 12, 2021
- Preceded by: Steven Dickerson

Mayor of Oak Hill
- In office 2014–2020
- Preceded by: Ron Coles
- Succeeded by: Dale Grimes

Personal details
- Party: Democratic
- Education: Sarah Lawrence College (BA); Vanderbilt University (MBA)
- Website: Campaign website

Heidi Campbell is an American music publisher and politician from Tennessee. A member of the Democratic Party, Campbell has represented the 20th district of the Tennessee Senate, covering the inner suburbs of Nashville, since 2021.

== Career ==
Campbell is a music marketing director and has owned her own music publishing company since 1995. She served as mayor of Oak Hill, a small suburb south of Nashville from 2014 to 2020.

In the 2020 elections, she won the Democratic primary for a seat in the Tennessee Senate before defeating two-term Republican incumbent Steven Dickerson, 51.7% to 48.3%.

In April 2022, Campbell announced her candidacy for Tennessee's 5th congressional district in the United States House of Representatives after incumbent Jim Cooper chose to retire. The district encompasses Nashville-Davidson County and five other Tennessee counties. Although the 5th district had been traditionally Democratic, it was redrawn in the redistricting cycle to favor Republicans, and Republican Andy Ogles defeated Campbell.

On April 5, 2023, Campbell announced her candidacy in the 2023 election to succeed John Cooper as mayor of Nashville.

In November 2024, and as the incumbent Democrat Representative she retained her Tennessee Senate seat against Republican candidate Wyatt Rampy for District 20.

Campbell won by over 16,000 votes against Rampy in the November 5 2024 election.

== Personal life ==
Campbell is married and has two children.

== Electoral history ==
Tennessee's 20th Senate district general election, 2024
| Party | Candidate | Votes | % |
|---|---|---|---|
| Democratic | Heidi Campbell (incumbent) | 63,353 | 57.41% |
| Republican | Wyatt Rampy | 46,997 | 42.59% |
| Total votes | | 110,350 | 100.00% |

United States House of Representatives Elections in Tennessee, 2022: District 5
| Party | Candidate | Votes | % |
|---|---|---|---|
| Republican | Andy Ogles | 123,358 | 55.87 |
| Democratic | Heidi Campbell | 93,375 | 42.29 |
| Independent | Derrick Brantley | 2,083 | 0.94 |
| Independent | Daniel Cooper | 1,125 | 0.51 |
| Independent | Rich Shannon | 846 | 0.38 |
| Total votes | | 220,787 | 100 |

Tennessee Senate Election, 2020: District 20
| Party | Candidate | Votes | % |
|---|---|---|---|
| Democratic | Heidi Campbell | 58,746 | 51.8 |
| Republican | Steven Dickerson | 54,755 | 48.2 |
| Total votes | | 113,501 | 100 |

Tennessee’s 20th Senate District Democratic Primary Results, 2020
| Party | Candidate | Votes | % |
|---|---|---|---|
| Democratic | Heidi Campbell | 13,441 | 51.4 |
| Democratic | Kimi Abernathy | 12,723 | 48.6 |
| Total votes | | 26,164 | 100 |

Tennessee Senate
| Preceded by Steven Dickerson | Member of the Tennessee Senate from the 20th district 2021–present | Incumbent |
