= 2016 Tennessee Senate election =

- November 8, 2016

16 of the 33 seats in the Tennessee State Senate 17 seats needed for a majority
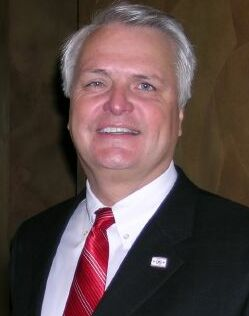

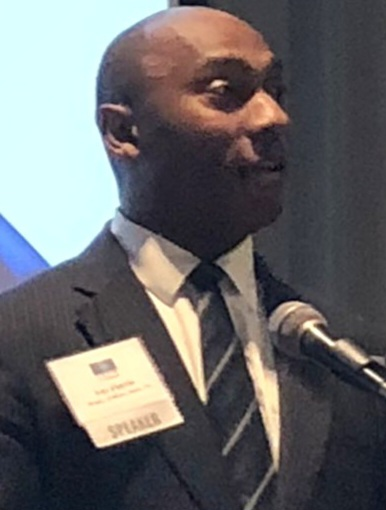
	Majority party	Minority party
Leader	Ron Ramsey (retired)	Lee Harris
Party	Republican	Democratic
Leader's seat	4th district	29th district
Seats before	28	5
Seats won	28	5
Seat change	Steady	Steady
Popular vote	802,362	172,753
Percentage	80.82%	17.40%
Swing	▲9.62%	▼8.78%
- Republican hold Democratic hold No Election 50–60% 60–70% 70–80% >90% >90%
Speaker before election
Ron Ramsey
Republican
Elected Speaker
Randy McNally
Republican

The 2016 Tennessee State Senate election was held on November 8, 2016, to elect 16 of the 33 seats for the Tennessee's State Senate. The elections coincided with the Presidential, U.S. House, and State House elections. The primary elections were held on August 4, 2016.

== Retirements ==
=== Republicans ===
- District 4: Ron Ramsey, lieutenant governor of Tennessee.

== Predictions ==
Source	Ranking	As of
Governing	Safe R	May 18, 2016

== Results summary ==
Party	Candidates	Votes		Seats				
Party	Candidates	No.	%	Before	Up	Won	After	+/–
Republican	15	802,362	80.82	28	15	15	28	Steady
Democratic	6	172,753	17.40	5	1	1	5	Steady
Independent	1	17,640	1.78	0	0	0	0	Steady
Write-in	1	1	0.00	0	0	0	0	Steady
Total		992,756	100	33	18	18	33	Steady

Popular vote
Republican	80.82%
Democratic	17.40%
Other	1.77%

Senate seats
Republican	84.85%
Democratic	15.15%

=== Closest race ===
Many of the senators running in this election ran unopposed. However, this race was the closest in the Senate election:

District	Winner	Margin
District 10	Republican	11.74%

== District 2 ==
2016 Tennessee's 2nd Senate district election
- November 8, 2016
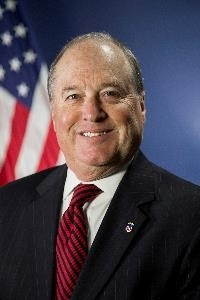
Nominee	Doug Overbey (Uncontested)
Party	Republican
Popular vote	66,262
Percentage	100.00%
Senator before election
Doug Overbey
Republican
Elected Senator
Doug Overbey
Republican

=== Republican primary ===
==== Candidates ====
- Doug Overbey, incumbent senator
- Scott Williams, veteran and small business owner

Republican primary
Party	Candidate	Votes	%
Republican	Doug Overbey (incumbent)	8,126	61.19%
Republican	Scott Williams	5,155	38.81%
Total votes		13,281	100.00%

=== General election ===
General election
Party	Candidate	Votes	%
Republican	Doug Overbey (incumbent)	66,262	100.00%
Total votes		66,262	100.00%

== District 4 ==
2016 Tennessee's 4th Senate district election
- November 8, 2016
Nominee	Jon Lundberg (Uncontested)
Party	Republican
Popular vote	60,516
Percentage	100.00%
Senator before election
Ron Ramsey
Republican
Elected Senator
Jon Lundberg
Republican

=== Republican primary ===
==== Candidates ====
- John Paul Blevins
- Neal Kerney, veteran and small business owner
- Jon Lundberg, state representative for the 1st district
- Tony Shipley, state representative for the 2nd district

==== Declined ====
- Ron Ramsey, incumbent senator and Speaker of the Senate (retiring)

Republican primary results
Party	Candidate	Votes	%
Republican	Jon Lundberg	7,019	55.21%
Republican	Tony Shipley	2,684	21.11%
Republican	Neal Kerney	2,629	20.68%
Republican	John Paul Blevins	381	3.00%
Total votes		12,713	100.00%

=== General election ===
General election
Party	Candidate	Votes	%
Republican	Jon Lundberg	60,516	100.00%
Total votes		60,516	100.00%

== District 6 ==
2016 Tennessee's 6th Senate district election
- November 8, 2016
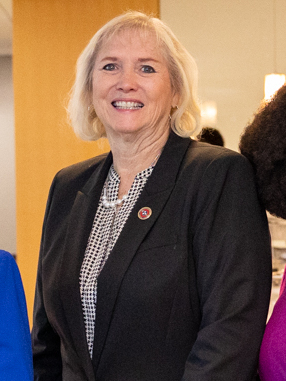
Nominee	Becky Duncan Massey (Uncontested)
Party	Republican
Popular vote	62,688
Percentage	100.00%
Senator before election
Becky Duncan Massey
Republican
Elected Senator
Becky Duncan Massey
Republican

=== Republican primary ===
==== Candidates ====
- Becky Duncan Massey, incumbent senator

Republican primary results
Party	Candidate	Votes	%
Republican	Becky Duncan Massey (incumbent)	5,563	100.00%
Total votes		5,563	100.00%

=== General election ===
General election
Party	Candidate	Votes	%
Republican	Becky Duncan Massey (incumbent)	62,688	100.00%
Total votes		62,688	100.00%

== District 8 ==
2016 Tennessee's 8th Senate district election
- November 8, 2016
Nominee	Frank Niceley (Uncontested)
Party	Republican
Popular vote	49,440
Percentage	100.00%
Senator before election
Frank Niceley
Republican
Elected Senator
Frank Niceley
Republican

=== Republican primary ===
- Frank Niceley, incumbent senator

Republican primary results
Party	Candidate	Votes	%
Republican	Frank Niceley (incumbent)	11,114	100.00%
Total votes		11,114	100.00%

=== General election ===
General election
Party	Candidate	Votes	%
Republican	Frank Niceley (incumbent)	49,440	100.00%
Total votes		49,440	100.00%

== District 10 ==
2016 Tennessee's 10th Senate district election
- November 8, 2016
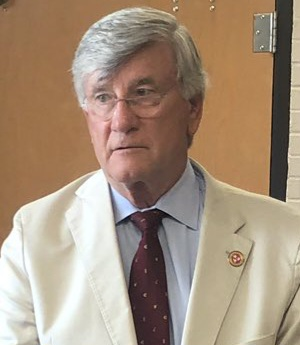

Nominee	Todd Gardenhire	Khristy Wilkinson
Party	Republican	Democratic
Popular vote	39,308	31,043
Percentage	55.87%	44.13%
- County results Gardenhire: 80–90% Wilkinson: 50–60%
Senator before election
Todd Gardenhire
Republican
Elected Senator
Todd Gardenhire
Republican

=== Republican primary ===
==== Candidates ====
- Todd Gardenhire, incumbent senator
  Republican primary results
  Party	Candidate	Votes	%
  Republican	Todd Gardenhire (incumbent)	6,058	100.00%
  Total votes		6,058	100.00%

=== Democratic primary ===
==== Candidates ====
- Ty O'Grady, entrepreneur and college professor
- Khristy Wilkinson
- Nick Wilkinson, director of the Chattanooga Office of Economic Development
  Democratic primary results
  Party	Candidate	Votes	%
  Democratic	Khristy Wilkinson	2,662	43.58%
  Democratic	Nick Wilkinson	2,111	34.56%
  Democratic	Ty O'Grady	1,335	21.86%
  Total votes		6,108	100.00%

=== General election ===
General election
Party	Candidate	Votes	%
Republican	Todd Gardenhire (incumbent)	39,308	55.87%
Democratic	Khristy Wilkinson	31,043	44.13%
Total votes		70,351	100.00%

== District 12 ==
2016 Tennessee's 12th Senate district election
- November 8, 2016
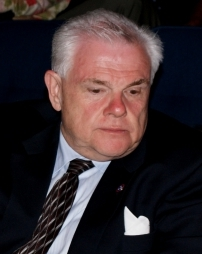
Nominee	Ken Yager (Uncontested)
Party	Republican
Popular vote	55,219
Percentage	100.00%
Senator before election
Ken Yager
Republican
Elected Senator
Ken Yager
Republican

=== Republican primary ===
==== Candidates ====
- Ken Yager, incumbent senator

Republican primary results
Party	Candidate	Votes	%
Republican	Ken Yager (incumbent)	12,860	100.00%
Total votes		12,860	100.00%

=== General election ===
General election
Party	Candidate	Votes	%
Republican	Ken Yager (incumbent)	55,219	100.00%
Total votes		55,219	100.00%

== District 14 ==
2016 Tennessee's 14th Senate district election
- November 8, 2016
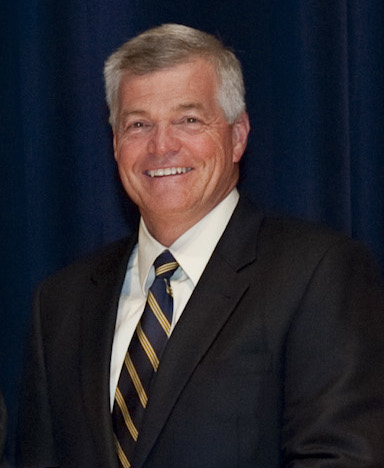

Nominee	Jim Tracy	Gayle Jordan
Party	Republican	Democratic
Popular vote	53,082	18,259
Percentage	74.41%	25.59%
- Results by county Tracy: 60–70% 70–80% 80–90%
Senator before election
Jim Tracy
Republican
Elected Senator
Jim Tracy
Republican

=== Republican primary ===
==== Candidates ====
- Jim Tracy, incumbent senator
- Matt Randolph, retail manager
- Steve Lane, teacher

Republican primary results
Party	Candidate	Votes	%
Republican	Jim Tracy (incumbent)	10,817	81.63%
Republican	Steve Lane	1,681	12.68%
Republican	Matt Randolph	754	5.69%
Total votes		13,252	100.00%

=== Democratic primary ===
==== Candidates ====
- Gayle Jordan, attorney

Democratic primary results
Party	Candidate	Votes	%
Democratic	Gayle Jordan	2,767	100.00%
Total votes		2,767	100.00%

=== General election ===
General election
Party	Candidate	Votes	%
Republican	Jim Tracy (incumbent)	53,082	74.41%
Democratic	Gayle Jordan	18,259	25.59%
Total votes		71,341	100.00%

== District 16 ==
2016 Tennessee's 16th Senate district election
- November 8, 2016

Nominee	Janice Bowling	Mike Winton
Party	Republican	Democratic
Popular vote	46,846	22,205
Percentage	67.84%	32.16%
- Results by county Bowling: 60–70% 70–80% Winton: 50–60%
Senator before election
Janice Bowling
Republican
Elected Senator
Janice Bowling
Republican

=== Republican primary ===
==== Candidates ====
- Janice Bowling, incumbent senator
- Michael Shane Wilcher, member of the Warren County Commission from the 3rd district

Republican primary
Party	Candidate	Votes	%
Republican	Janice Bowling (incumbent)	10,235	81.74%
Republican	Scott Williams	2,287	18.26%
Total votes		12,522	100.00%

=== Democratic primary ===
==== Candidates ====
- Mike Winton, businessman
- Alice Demetreon, retired corrections officer

Democratic primary
Party	Candidate	Votes	%
Democratic	Mike Winton	3,342	70.27%
Democratic	Alice Demetreon	1,414	29.73%
Total votes		4,756	100.00%

=== General election ===
General election
Party	Candidate	Votes	%
Republican	Janice Bowling (incumbent)	46,846	67.84%
Democratic	Mike Winton	22,205	32.16%
Total votes		69,051	100.00%

== District 18 ==
2016 Tennessee's 18th Senate district election
- November 8, 2016
Nominee	Ferrell Haile (Uncontested)
Party	Republican
Popular vote	64,220
Percentage	100.00%
Senator before election
Ferrell Haile
Republican
Elected Senator
Ferrell Haile
Republican

=== Republican primary ===
==== Candidates ====
- Ferrell Haile, incumbent senator

Republican primary results
Party	Candidate	Votes	%
Republican	Ferrell Haile (incumbent)	10,326	100.00%
Total votes		10,326	100.00%

=== General election ===
General election
Party	Candidate	Votes	%
Republican	Ferrell Haile (incumbent)	64,220	100.00%
Total votes		64,220	100.00%

== District 20 ==
2016 Tennessee's 20th Senate district election
- November 8, 2016
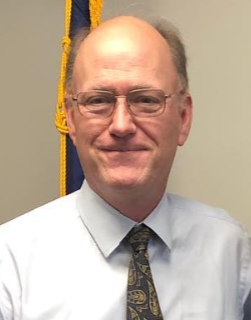

Nominee	Steven Dickerson	Erin Coleman
Party	Republican	Democratic
Popular vote	52,966	41,172
Percentage	56.26%	43.74%
- Precinct results Dickerson: 50–60% 60–70% 70–80% Coleman: 50–60% 60–70% >90%
Senator before election
Steven Dickerson
Republican
Elected Senator
Steven Dickerson
Republican

The 20th senate district was based in Davidson County, and encompassed many of Nashville's wealthy inner suburbs, including Forest Hills, Belle Meade, and parts of Oak Hill and Goodlettsville. The district had been represented by Republican Steven Dickerson.

Incumbent Steven Dickerson won both the primary and the general election comfortably, receiving 59.9% of the vote in the primary and 56.3% in the general election.

In the concurrent 2016 presidential race, Democratic nominee Hillary Clinton narrowly carried this district, winning by 0.2%.

=== Republican primary ===
==== Candidates ====
- Steven Dickerson, incumbent senator
- Ron McDow, Tennessee delegate at the 2016 Republican National Convention

Republican primary
Party	Candidate	Votes	%
Republican	Steven Dickerson (incumbent)	5,222	59.94%
Republican	Ron McDow	3,490	40.06%
Total votes		8,712	100.00%

=== Democratic primary ===
==== Candidates ====
- Erin Coleman, attorney

Democratic primary results
Party	Candidate	Votes	%
Democratic	Erin Coleman	8,788	100.00%
Total votes		8,788	100.00%

=== General election ===
General election
Party	Candidate	Votes	%
Republican	Steven Dickerson (incumbent)	52,966	56.26%
Democratic	Erin Coleman	41,172	43.74%
Write-in	Joseph H. Johnston (write-in)	1	0.00%
Total votes		54,287	100.00%

== District 22 ==
2016 Tennessee's 22nd Senate district election
- November 8, 2016
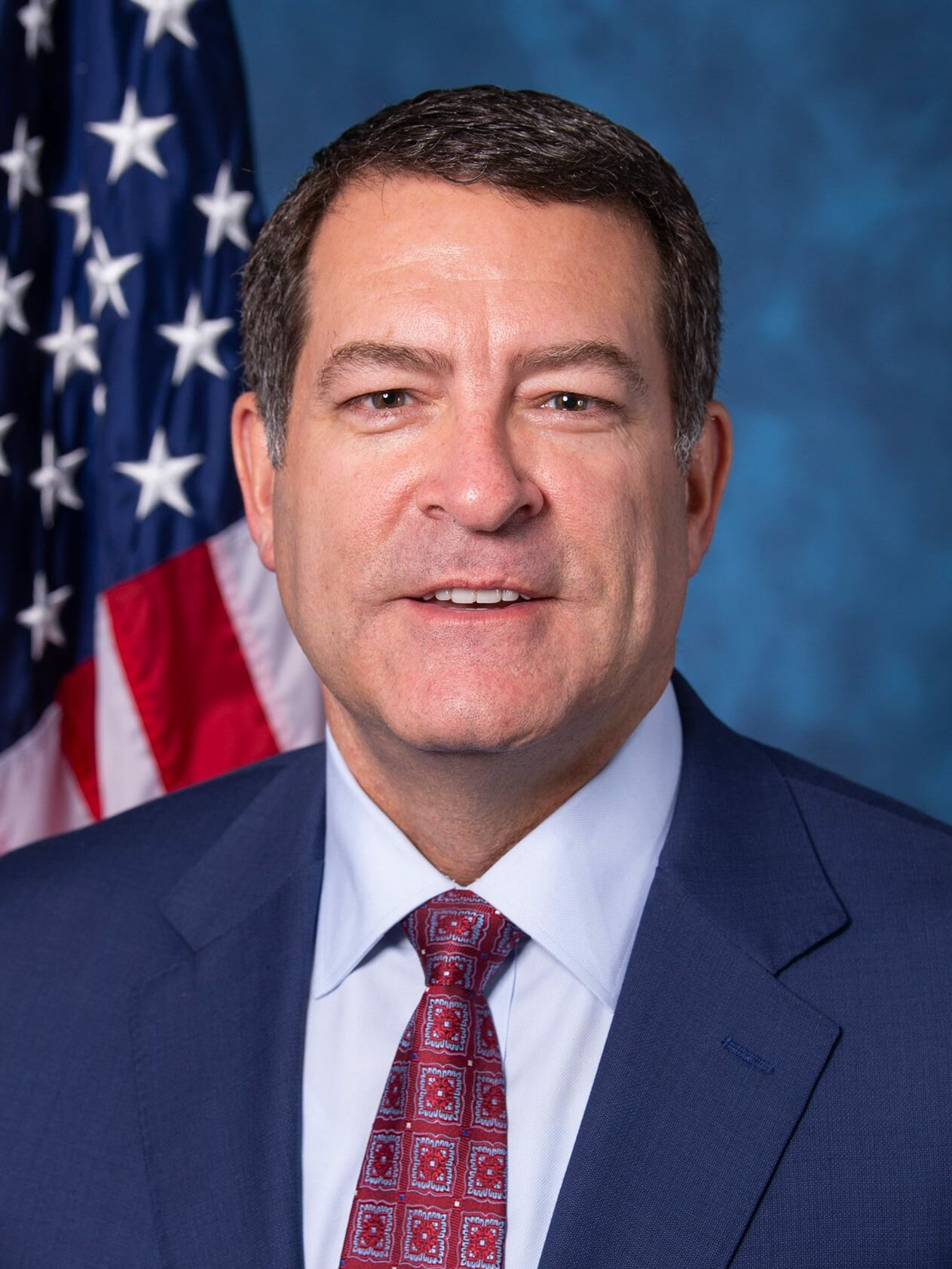

Nominee	Mark Green	David L. Cutting
Party	Republican	Democratic
Popular vote	41,497	20,406
Percentage	67.04%	32.96%
- Green: 50–60% 60–70% 70–80% 80–90% Cutting: 50–60%
Senator before election
Mark Green
Republican
Elected Senator
Mark Green
Republican

The 22nd senate district was based in Clarksville, where it covered Montgomery County, as well as Stewart and Houston Counties. The district had been represented by Republican Mark Green.

Incumbent Mark Green won both the primary and the general election easily, receiving 84.2% of the vote in the primary and 67.0% in the general election.

In the concurrent 2016 presidential race, Republican nominee Donald Trump comfortably carried this district, which he received 58.1% of the vote. Mark Green ran well ahead of Trump across the district, easily outperforming him overall and posting especially strong margins in Montgomery County.

=== Republican primary ===
==== Candidates ====
- Mark Green, incumbent senator
- Lori L. Smith, small business owner, Clarksville fencing

Republican primary
Party	Candidate	Votes	%
Republican	Mark Green (incumbent)	6,183	84.17%
Republican	Lori L. Smith	1,163	15.83%
Total votes		7,346	100.00%

=== Democratic primary ===
==== Candidates ====
- David L. Cutting, retired architectural engineer and small business owner

Democratic primary results
Party	Candidate	Votes	%
Democratic	David L. Cutting	2,692	100.00%
Total votes		2,692	100.00%

=== General election ===
General election
Party	Candidate	Votes	%
Republican	Mark Green (incumbent)	41,497	67.04%
Democratic	David L. Cutting	20,406	32.96%
Total votes		61,903	100.00%

By county

County	Green	%	Cutting	%	Total
Houston	2,070	69.72%	899	30.28%	2,969
Montgomery	35,631	65.99%	18,362	34.01%	53,993
Stewart	3,796	76.83%	1,145	23.17%	4,941

== District 24 ==
2016 Tennessee's 24th Senate district election
- November 8, 2016
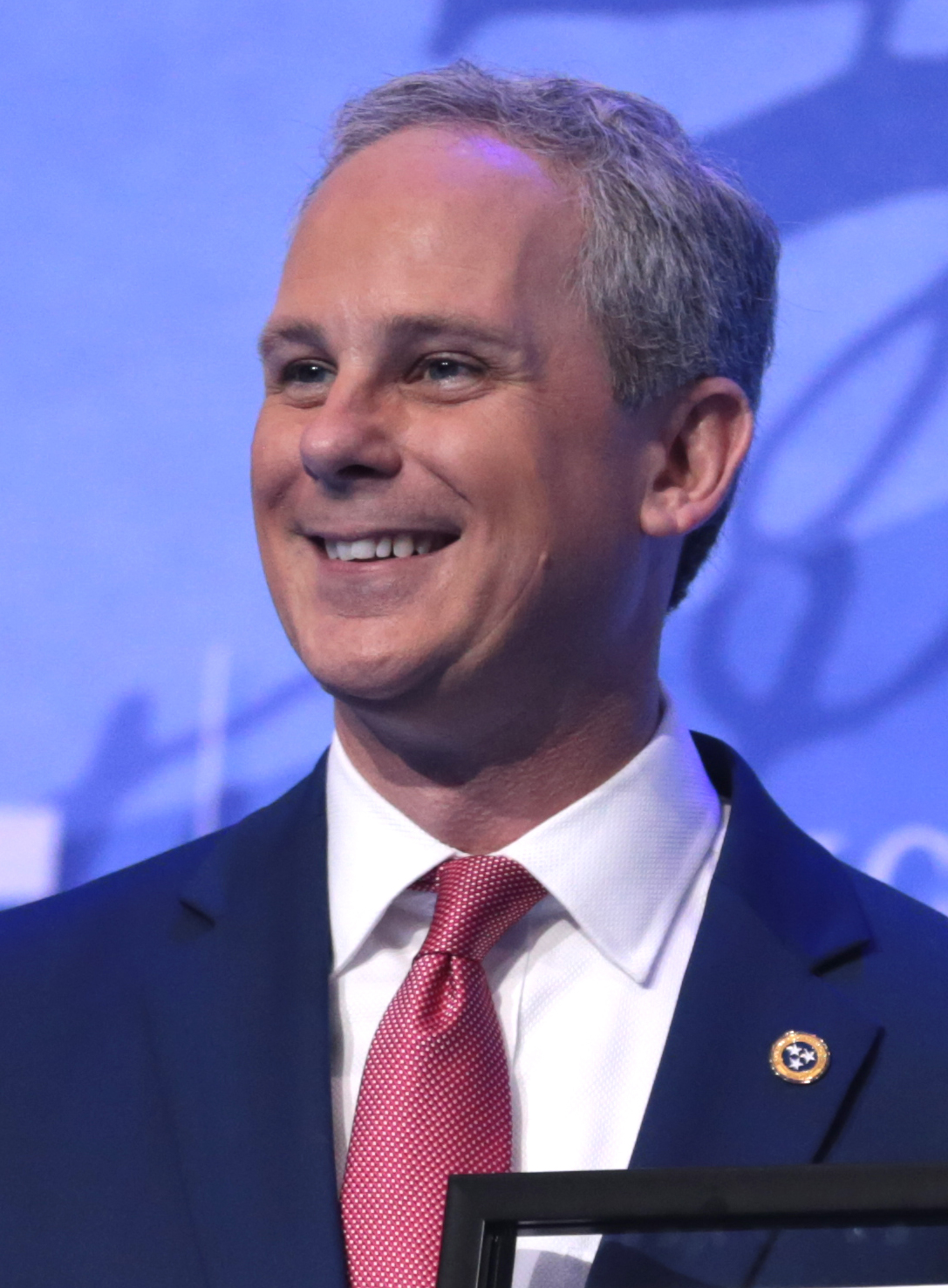
Nominee	John Stevens (Uncontested)
Party	Republican
Popular vote	46,945
Percentage	100.00%
Senator before election
John Stevens
Republican
Elected Senator
John Stevens
Republican

=== Republican primary ===
==== Candidates ====
- John Stevens, incumbent senator

Republican primary results
Party	Candidate	Votes	%
Republican	John Stevens (incumbent)	9,474	100.00%
Total votes		9,474	100.00%

=== General election ===
General election
Party	Candidate	Votes	%
Republican	John Stevens (incumbent)	46,945	100.00%
Total votes		46,945	100.00%

== District 26 ==
2016 Tennessee's 26th Senate district election
- November 8, 2016
Nominee	Dolores Gresham (Uncontested)
Party	Republican
Popular vote	54,210
Percentage	100.00%
Senator before election
Dolores Gresham
Republican
Elected Senator
Dolores Gresham
Republican

=== Republican primary ===
==== Candidates ====
- Dolores Gresham, incumbent senator
- Bob Shutt, mayor of Savannah, Tennessee

Republican primary
Party	Candidate	Votes	%
Republican	Dolores Gresham (incumbent)	9,938	52.79%
Republican	Bob Shutt	8,889	47.21%
Total votes		18,827	100.00%

=== General election ===
General election
Party	Candidate	Votes	%
Republican	Dolores Gresham (incumbent)	54,210	100.00%
Total votes		54,210	100.00%

== District 28 ==
2016 Tennessee's 28th Senate district election
- November 8, 2016
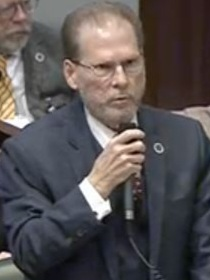

Nominee	Joey Hensley	Joey Norman
Party	Republican	Independent
Popular vote	51,251	17,460
Percentage	74.59%	25.41%
Senator before election
Joey Hensley
Republican
Elected Senator
Joey Hensley
Republican

=== Republican primary ===
==== Candidates ====
- Joey Hensley, incumbent senator

Republican primary results
Party	Candidate	Votes	%
Republican	Joey Hensley (incumbent)	9,260	100%
Total votes		9,260	100%

=== Independent candidate ===
- Joey Norman, firefighter

=== General election ===
General election
Party	Candidate	Votes	%
Republican	Joey Hensley (incumbent)	51,251	74.59%
Independent	Joey Norman	17,460	25.41%
Total votes		68,711	100.00%

== District 30 ==
2016 Tennessee's 30th Senate district election
- November 8, 2016
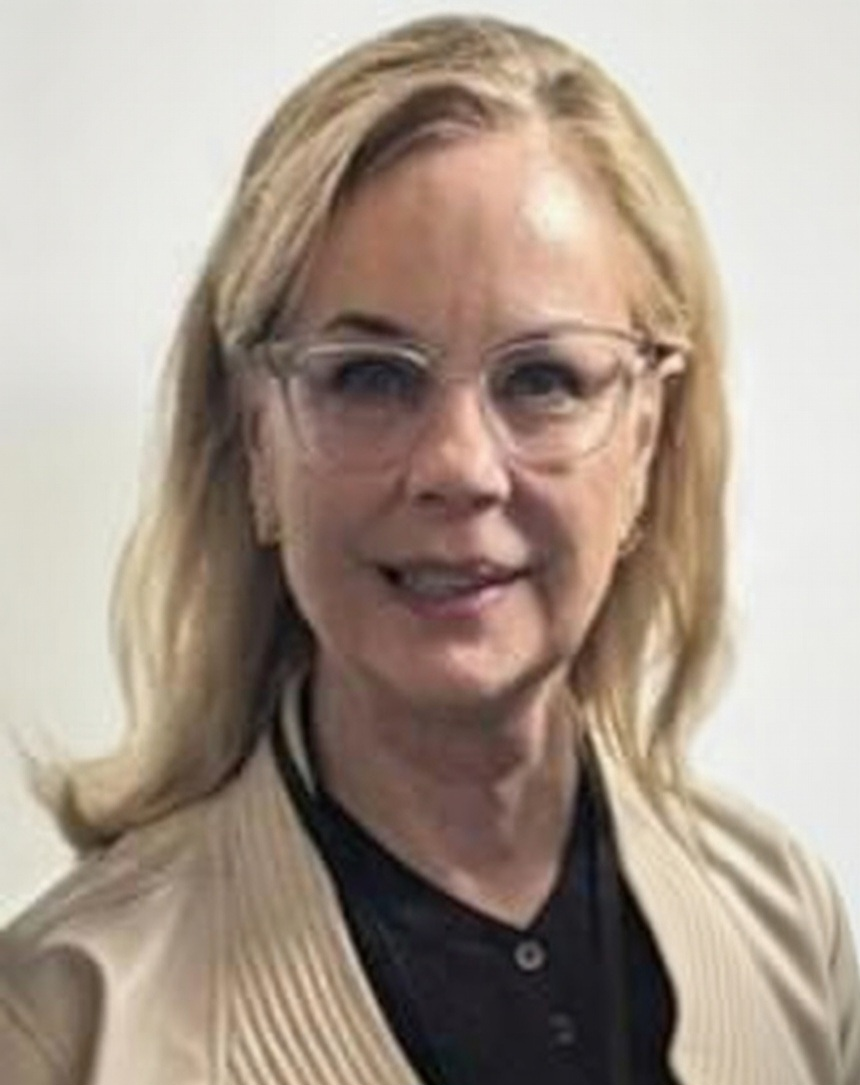
Nominee	Sara Kyle (Uncontested)
Party	Democratic
Popular vote	39,668
Percentage	100.00%
Senator before election
Sara Kyle
Democratic
Elected Senator
Sara Kyle
Democratic

=== Democratic primary ===
==== Candidates ====
- Sara Kyle, incumbent senator
- Beverly Marrero, former 30th district senator

Democratic primary results
Party	Candidate	Votes	%
Democratic	Sara Kyle (incumbent)	7,607	75.42%
Democratic	Beverly Marrero	2,479	24.58%
Total votes		10,086	100.00%

=== General election ===
General election
Party	Candidate	Votes	%
Democratic	Sara Kyle (incumbent)	39,668	100.00%
Total votes		39,668	100.00%

== District 32 ==
2016 Tennessee's 32nd Senate district election
- November 8, 2016
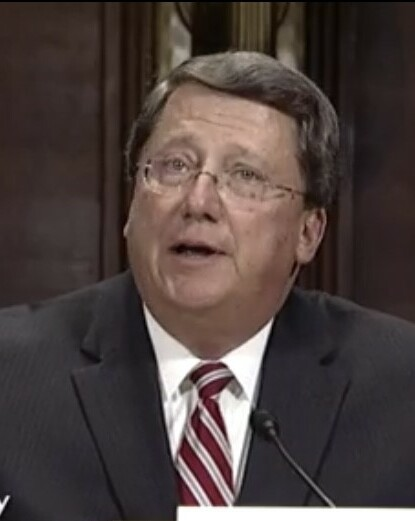
Nominee	Mark Norris (Uncontested)
Party	Republican
Popular vote	57,912
Percentage	100.00%
Senator before election
Mark Norris
Republican
Elected Senator
Mark Norris
Republican

=== Republican primary ===
==== Candidates ====
- Mark Norris, incumbent senator

Republican primary results
Party	Candidate	Votes	%
Republican	Mark Norris (incumbent)	15,273	100.00%
Total votes		15,273	100.00%

=== General election ===
General election
Party	Candidate	Votes	%
Republican	Mark Norris (incumbent)	57,912	100.00%
Total votes		57,912	100.00%

== See also ==
- 2016 Tennessee elections
- 2016 Tennessee House of Representatives election
