= Tennessee's 20th Senate district =

American legislative district

Tennessee's 20th State Senate district
Senator
Heidi Campbell; D–Oak Hill
- Demographics: 75% White; 12% Black; 6% Hispanic; 3% Asian; 3% Multiracial
- Population (2022): 218,507

Tennessee's 20th Senate district is one of 33 districts in the Tennessee Senate. It has been represented by Democrat Heidi Campbell since 2020, following her defeat of incumbent Republican Steven Dickerson.

== Geography ==
District 20 covers many of Nashville's wealthy inner suburbs in Davidson County, including Forest Hills, Belle Meade, most of Oak Hill, and part of Goodlettsville. The rest of the district consists of parts of outer Nashville proper.

The district is located in Tennessee's 5th, 6th, and 7th congressional districts

== Recent election results ==
Tennessee Senators are elected to staggered four-year terms, with odd-numbered districts holding elections in midterm years and even-numbered districts holding elections in presidential years.

=== Results under new lines (2022–2032) ===
Tennessee's 20th Senate district general election, 2024
Party	Candidate	Votes	%
Democratic	Heidi Campbell (incumbent)	63,353	57.41%
Republican	Wyatt Rampy	46,997	42.59%
Total votes		110,350	100.00%

=== 2020 ===
2020 Tennessee Senate election, District 20
Primary election
Party	Candidate	Votes	%
Democratic	Heidi Campbell	13,292	51.4
Democratic	Kimi Abernathy	12,575	48.6
Total votes		25,867	100
General election
Democratic	Heidi Campbell	58,746	51.8
Republican	Steven Dickerson (incumbent)	54,755	48.2
Total votes		113,501	100
Democratic gain from Republican			

=== 2016 ===
2016 Tennessee Senate election, District 20
Primary election
Party	Candidate	Votes	%
Republican	Steven Dickerson (incumbent)	5,222	59.9
Republican	Ron McDow	3,490	40.1
Total votes		8,712	100
General election
Republican	Steven Dickerson (incumbent)	52,966	56.3
Democratic	Erin Coleman	41,172	43.7
Total votes		94,138	100
Republican hold			

=== 2012 ===
2012 Tennessee Senate election, District 20
Primary election
Party	Candidate	Votes	%
Democratic	Phillip North	5,148	74.3
Democratic	James Baxter	1,784	25.7
Total votes		6,932	100
Republican	Steven Dickerson	5,378	48.5
Republican	David Hall	3,325	30.0
Republican	Rob Mortenson	2,379	21.5
Total votes		11,082	100
General election
Republican	Steven Dickerson	46,254	54.1
Democratic	Phillip North	39,280	45.9
Total votes		85,534	100
Republican gain from Democratic			

=== Federal and statewide results ===
Year	Office	Results
2020	President	Biden 53.3 – 44.0%
2016	President	Clinton 47.3 – 47.1%
2012	President	Romney 56.1 – 42.4%
2012	Senate	Corker 65.1 – 29.1%
