= 2024 Tennessee Senate election =

2024 Tennessee State Senate election
- November 5, 2024

16 of the 33 seats in the Tennessee State Senate 17 seats needed for a majority
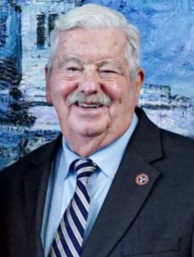

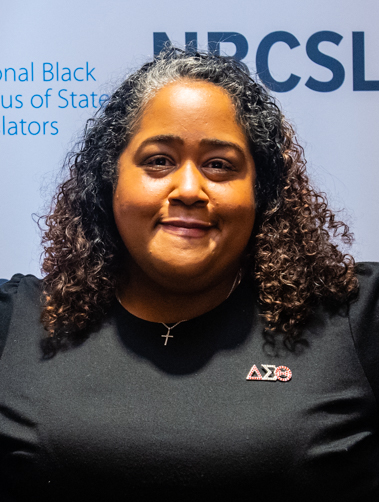
	Majority party	Minority party
Leader	Randy McNally	Raumesh Akbari
Party	Republican	Democratic
Leader's seat	5th - Oak Ridge	29th - Memphis
Last election	27 seats	6 seats
Seats before	27	6
Seats won	27	6
Seat change	Steady	Steady
Popular vote	969,827	325,890
Percentage	71.65%	24.08%
Swing	▲1.01%	▼2.73%
- Republican hold Democratic hold No election 60–70% 70–80% 80–90% >90% 50–60% 70–80%
Speaker before election
Randy McNally
Republican
Elected Speaker
Randy McNally
Republican

The 2024 Tennessee State Senate elections were held on November 5, 2024, to elect 16 of the 33 seats in the Tennessee State Senate. The elections coincided with the Presidential, U.S. Senate, U.S. House, and State House elections. The primary elections were held on August 1, 2024, with the exception of presidential primaries being held on March 5. Tennessee has open primaries, meaning that any voter can choose to vote on either a Republican or Democratic ballot during primary elections.

Following the 2024 elections, no seats changed hands, leaving Tennessee's State Senate delegation at a 27–6 Republican supermajority.

== Retirements ==
=== Republicans ===
1. District 2: Art Swann retired.

== Incumbents defeated ==
=== In primary election ===
Two incumbent senators, both Republicans, were defeated in the August 1 primary election.

==== Republicans ====
1. District 4: Jon Lundberg lost renomination to Bobby Harshbarger.
2. District 8: Frank Niceley lost renomination to Jessie Seal.

== Predictions ==
Most recent CNalysis forecast Republican: Solid R; Democratic: Solid D; No election

Source	Ranking	As of
CNalysis	Solid R	October 31, 2024

== Summary of results ==
Italics denote an open seat held by the incumbent party; bold text denotes a gain for a party.

State Senate District	Incumbent	Party	Elected Senator	Outcome
2	Art Swann	Rep	Tom Hatcher	Rep Hold
4	Jon Lundberg	Rep	Bobby Harshbarger	Rep Hold
6	Becky Duncan Massey	Rep	Becky Duncan Massey	Rep Hold
8	Frank Niceley	Rep	Jessie Seal	Rep Hold
10	Todd Gardenhire	Rep	Todd Gardenhire	Rep Hold
12	Ken Yager	Rep	Ken Yager	Rep Hold
14	Shane Reeves	Rep	Shane Reeves	Rep Hold
16	Janice Bowling	Rep	Janice Bowling	Rep Hold
18	Ferrell Haile	Rep	Ferrell Haile	Rep Hold
20	Heidi Campbell	Dem	Heidi Campbell	Dem Hold
22	Bill Powers	Rep	Bill Powers	Rep Hold
24	John D. Stevens	Rep	John D. Stevens	Rep Hold
26	Page Walley	Rep	Page Walley	Rep Hold
28	Joey Hensley	Rep	Joey Hensley	Rep Hold
30	Sara P. Kyle	Dem	Sara P. Kyle	Dem Hold
32	Paul W. Rose	Rep	Paul W. Rose	Rep Hold

== Overview ==
Summary of the November 5, 2024 Tennessee Senate election results
Party	Candidates	Votes		Seats				
Party	Candidates	No.	%	Before	Up	Won	After	+/–
Republican	15	969,827	71.65%	27	14	14	27	Steady
Democratic	11	325,890	24.08%	6	2	2	6	Steady
Independent	6	57,817	4.27%	0	0	0	0	Steady
Write-in	1	11	0.00%					Steady
Total		1,353,545	100.00%	33	17	17	33	Steady

Popular vote
Republican	71.65%
Democratic	24.08%
Independents	4.27%

Senate seats
Republican	81.82%
Democratic	18.18%

District	Incumbent			Results	Candidates
District	Senator	Party	Electoral history	Results	Candidates
District 2	Art Swann	Republican	2017 (Appointed)	Incumbent retiring New member elected Republican hold	▌ ✓ Tom Hatcher (Republican); ▌ Patti Young (Democratic)
District 4	Jon Lundberg	Republican	2016	Incumbent lost renomination New member elected Republican hold	▌ ✓ Bobby Harshbarger (Republican); ▌ Dalia M. Price (Independent)
District 6	Becky Duncan Massey	Republican	2011 (special)	Incumbent re-elected	▌ ✓ Becky Duncan Massey (Republican); ▌ Dominica Bryan (Democratic)
District 8	Frank Niceley	Republican	2012	Incumbent lost renomination New member elected Republican hold	▌ ✓ Jessie Seal (Republican); ▌ R.E. Ellison (Democratic)
District 10	Todd Gardenhire	Republican	2012	Incumbent re-elected	▌ ✓ Todd Gardenhire (Republican); ▌ Missy Crutchfield (Democratic)
District 12	Ken Yager	Republican	2012	Incumbent re-elected	▌ ✓ Ken Yager (Republican); ▌ Curtis Kelly (Democratic); ▌ Charles Hutson II (Independent)
District 14	Shane Reeves	Republican	2018	Incumbent re-elected	▌ ✓ Shane Reeves (Republican); ▌ Elizabeth Smith (Democratic)
District 16	Janice Bowling	Republican	2012	Incumbent re-elected	▌ ✓ Janice Bowling (Republican); ▌ Wayne Steele (Democratic); ▌ Scott Bean (Independent)
District 18	Ferrell Haile	Republican	2012	Incumbent re-elected	▌ ✓ Ferrell Haile (Republican); ▌ Walter S. Chandler (Democratic); ▌ Laura A. Black (Independent); ▌ John Gentry (Independent)
District 20	Heidi Campbell	Democratic	2020	Incumbent re-elected	▌ ✓ Heidi Campbell (Democratic); ▌Wyatt Rampy (Republican)
District 22	Bill Powers	Republican	2019 (special)	Incumbent re-elected	▌ ✓ Bill Powers (Republican); ▌ Karen Reynolds (Democratic)
District 24	John Stevens	Republican	2012	Incumbent re-elected	▌ ✓ John Stevens (Republican)
District 26	Page Walley	Republican	2020	Incumbent re-elected	▌ ✓ Page Walley (Republican)
District 28	Joey Hensley	Republican	2012	Incumbent re-elected	▌ ✓ Joey Hensley (Republican); ▌ James Dallas (Democratic)
District 30	Sara Kyle	Democratic	2014 (special)	Incumbent re-elected	▌ ✓ Sara Kyle (Democratic); ▌ Mitchell Morrison (Independent)
District 32	Paul Rose	Republican	2012	Incumbent re-elected	▌ ✓ Paul Rose (Republican)

== District 2 ==
2024 Tennessee's 2nd Senate district election
- November 5, 2024
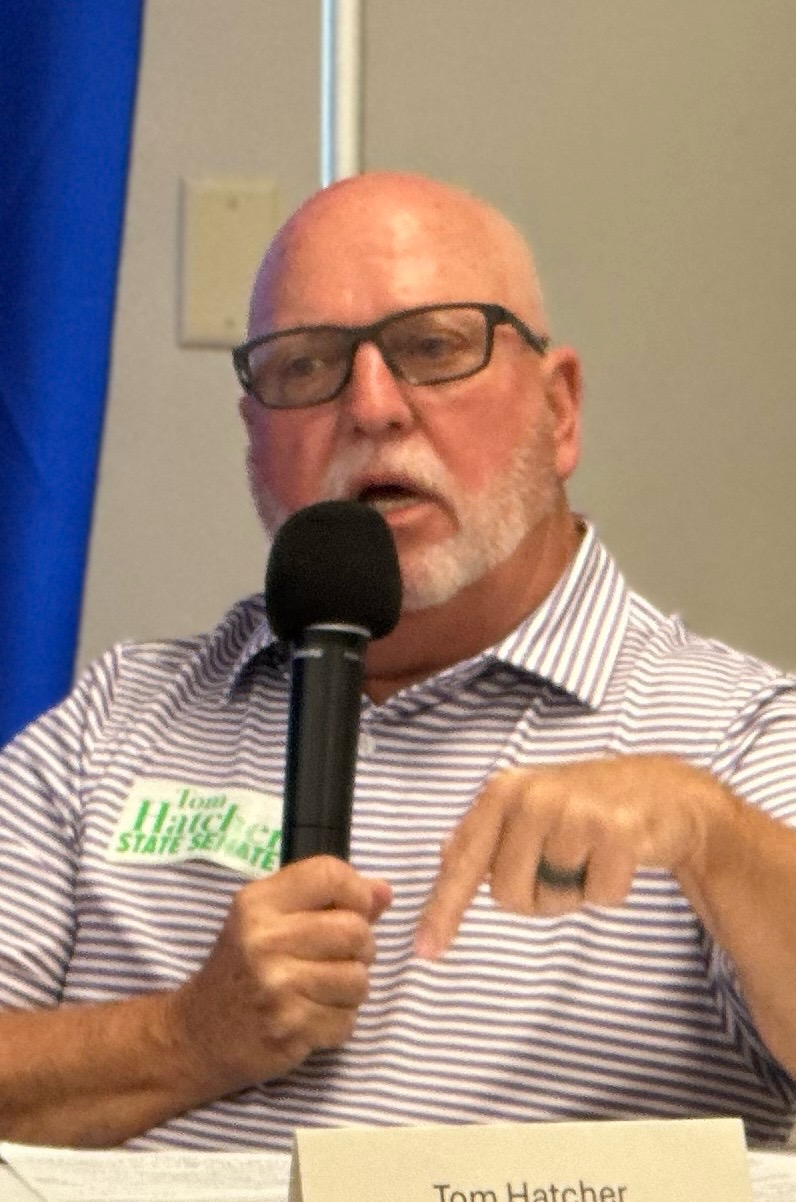

Nominee	Tom Hatcher	Patti Young
Party	Republican	Democratic
Popular vote	78,351	21,111
Percentage	78.77%	21.23%
- County results Hatcher: 70–80% 80–90%
Senator before election
Art Swann
Republican
Elected Senator
Tom Hatcher
Republican

The 2nd Senate district consists of all of Blount, Monroe, and Polk counties, and part of Bradley County. Since 2017, the district had been represented by Art Swann. On January 11, 2024, Swann announced he would not seek re-election.

=== Republican primary ===
==== Candidates ====
- Tom Hatcher, circuit court clerk of Blount County
- Bryan Richey, state representative from the 20th district
- John Pullias, business owner and manufacturing consultant

==== Declined ====
- Art Swann, incumbent senator

==== Results ====
Results by county: Hatcher: 70–80% 80–90%

Republican primary
Party	Candidate	Votes	%
Republican	Tom Hatcher	12,265	72.79%
Republican	Bryan Richey	3,239	19.22%
Republican	John G. Pullias	1,345	7.98%
Total votes		16,849	100.00%

=== Democratic primary ===
==== Candidates ====
- Patti Young, teacher and vice chair of the Blount County Democratic Party

==== Results ====
Democratic primary
Party	Candidate	Votes	%
Democratic	Patti Young	3,267	100.00%
Total votes		3,267	100.00%

=== General Election ===
Tennessee's 2nd Senate district general election, 2024
Party	Candidate	Votes	%
Republican	Tom Hatcher	78,351	78.77%
Democratic	Patti Young	21,111	21.23%
Total votes		99,462	100.00%

== District 4 ==
2024 Tennessee's 4th Senate district election
- November 5, 2024
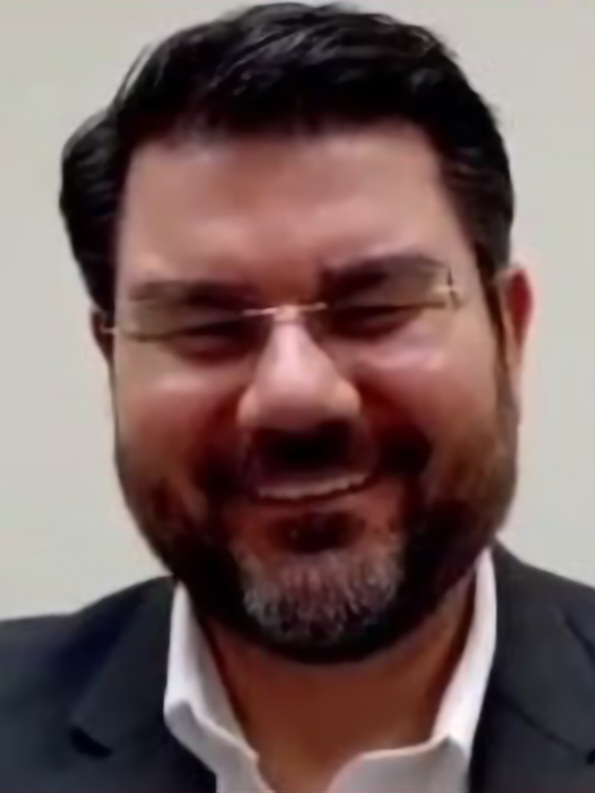

Nominee	Bobby Harshbarger	Dalia Price
Party	Republican	Independent
Popular vote	72,900	22,059
Percentage	76.77%	23.23%
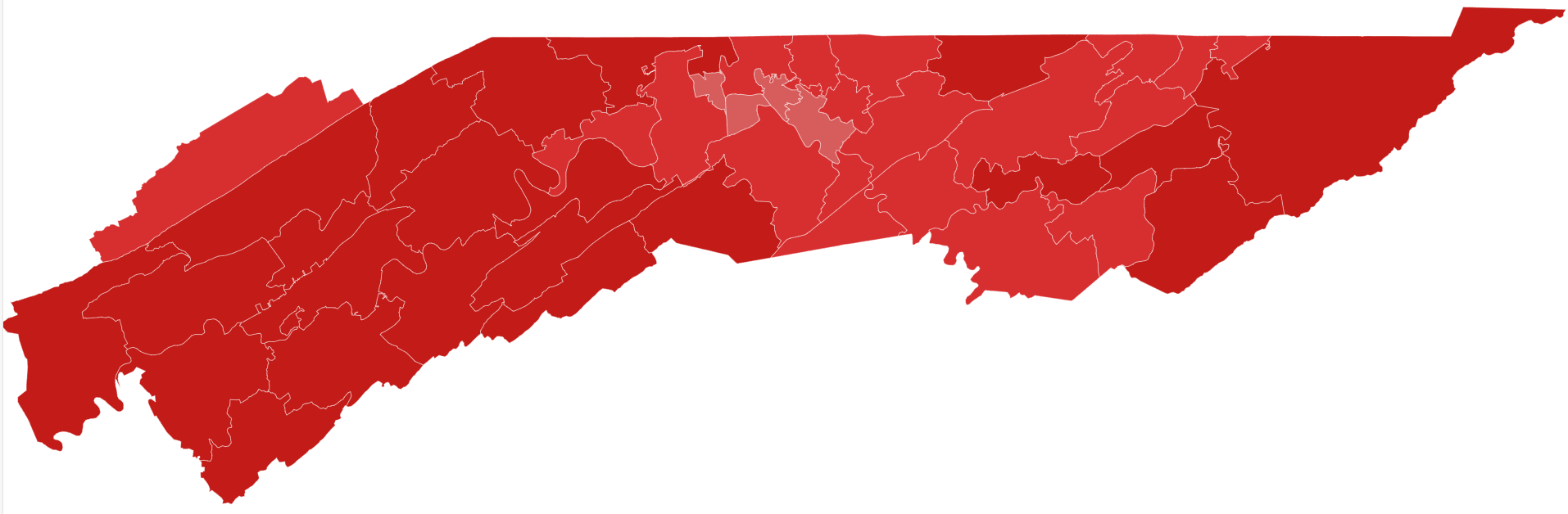
- Precinct results Harshbarger: 60–70% 70–80% 80–90%
Senator before election
Jon Lundberg
Republican
Elected Senator
Bobby Harshbarger
Republican

The 4th senate district includes all of Hawkins and Sullivan counties. The district had been represented by Jon Lundberg.

=== Republican primary ===
Incumbent Republican state senator Jon Lundberg ran for re-election with the backing of much of the state Republican establishment, including incumbent governor Bill Lee, lieutenant governor Randy McNally, and Senate Majority leader Jack Johnson, while his opponent, Bobby Harshbarger, the son of Diana Harshbarger, was backed by former U.S. President Donald Trump.

==== Candidates ====
- Jon Lundberg, incumbent senator
- Robert “Bob” Harshbarger III, pharmacist, former Kingsport board of alderman candidate in 2021, and son of U.S. congresswoman Diana Harshbarger

==== Endorsements ====
Jon Lundberg

U.S. representatives

- Phil Roe, former U.S Representative from Tennessee's 1st congressional district (2009–2021)

State-level officials

- Bill Lee, 50th Governor of Tennessee (2019–present)
- Randy McNally, Lieutenant Governor of Tennessee (2017–present)

State Senators

- Jack Johnson, Tennessee Senate Majority leader (2019–present)

Organizations

- Tennessee Right to Life
- Americans for Prosperity
Bobby Harshbarger

Executive Branch officials

- Donald Trump, 45th President of the United States (2017–2021)

U.S. Representatives

- Diana Harshbarger, U.S. Representative from Tennessee's 1st congressional district (2021–present) (candidate's mother)

==== Results ====
Results by county: Harshbarger: 50–60%

Results by precinct: Harshbarger: 50–60%; 60–70%; Lundberg: 50–60%; 60–70%

Republican primary
Party	Candidate	Votes	%
Republican	Bobby Harshbarger	11,540	51.96%
Republican	Jon Lundberg (incumbent)	10,668	48.04%
Total votes		22,208	100.00%

=== Independent candidates ===
- Dalia M. Price

=== General election ===
Tennessee's 4th Senate district general election, 2024
Party	Candidate	Votes	%
Republican	Bobby Harshbarger	72,900	76.77%
Independent	Dalia M. Price	22,059	23.23%
Total votes		94,959	100.00%

== District 6 ==
2024 Tennessee's 6th Senate district election
- November 5, 2024
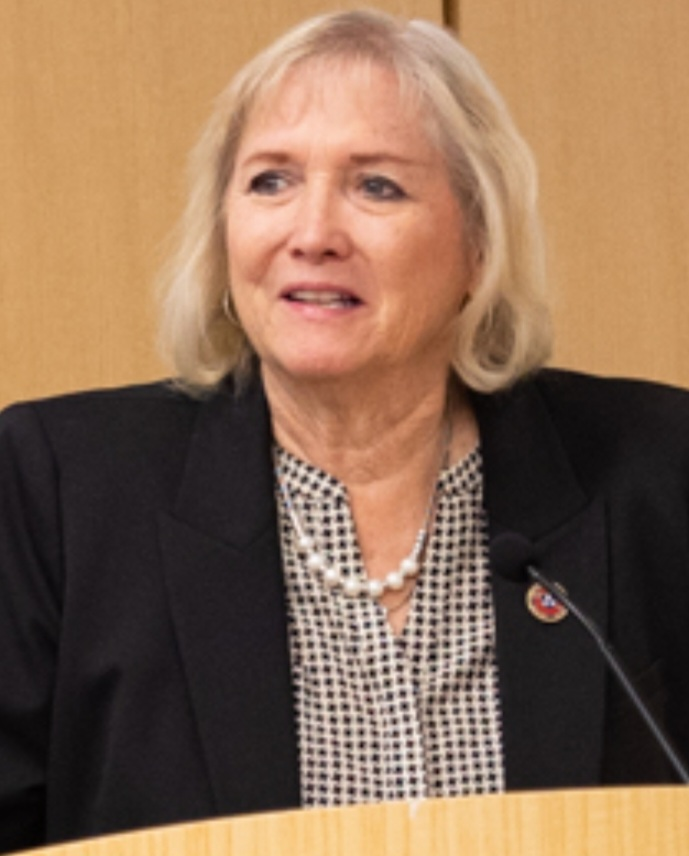

Nominee	Becky Duncan Massey	Domonica Bryan
Party	Republican	Democratic
Popular vote	63,009	35,219
Percentage	64.15%	35.85%
- Precinct results Massey: 50–60% 60–70% 70–80% 80–90% Bryan: 50–60% 60–70% 70–80% 80–90% >90% No data
Senator before election
Becky Duncan Massey
Republican
Elected Senator
Becky Duncan Massey
Republican

The 6th Senate district includes a large portion of Knox County. It covers southern and western portions of Knoxville, Seymour, and Strawberry Plains. The district had been represented by Becky Duncan Massey.

Republican Becky Duncan Massey easily won re-election and outperformed U.S. Representative Tim Burchett in many precincts within her district. While Burchett recorded the strongest showing of any Republican in Knox County during the 2024 federal races, Massey exceeded his performance in the part of Knox County that fall within her district.

=== Republican primary ===
==== Candidates ====
- Monica Irvine, entrepreneur
- Becky Duncan Massey, incumbent senator

==== Endorsements ====
Becky Duncan Massey

U.S. representatives

- Jimmy Duncan, former U.S Representative from Tennessee's 2nd congressional district (1988-2019) (candidate's brother)

Local officials

- Glenn Jacobs, Mayor of Knox County (2018-present)
- Charme Allen, District Attorney of Knox County (2014-present)

Labor unions

- Knoxville Firefighters Association
Monica Irvine

Organizations

- Tennessee Right to Life
- The Tennessee Conservative
- Moms for America Action
- Knox County Conservative Republicans
- Restore Liberty PAC
- Tennessee Firearms Association

==== Results ====
Republican primary
Party	Candidate	Votes	%
Republican	Becky Duncan Massey (incumbent)	10,085	59.76%
Republican	Monica Irvine	6,792	40.24%
Total votes		16,877	100.00%

=== Democratic primary ===
==== Candidates ====
- Domonica Bryan, social worker

==== Results ====
Democratic primary
Party	Candidate	Votes	%
Democratic	Domonica Bryan	10,336	100.00%
Total votes		10,336	100.00%

=== General Election ===
Tennessee's 6th Senate district general election, 2024
Party	Candidate	Votes	%
Republican	Becky Duncan Massey (incumbent)	63,009	64.15%
Democratic	Domonica Bryan	35,219	35.85%
Total votes		98,228	100.00%

== District 8 ==
2024 Tennessee's 8th Senate district election
- November 5, 2024
Nominee	Jessie Seal	R.E. Ellison
Party	Republican	Democratic
Popular vote	74,602	14,678
Percentage	83.56%	16.44%
- County results Seal: 80–90% >90%
Senator before election
Frank Niceley
Republican
Elected Senator
Jessie Seal
Republican

The 8th senate district includes Claiborne, Hancock, Union, Grainger, Jefferson, and part of Sevier County. The district had been represented by Frank Niceley.

Incumbent Frank Niceley was defeated for re-election in the Republican primary by Jessie Seal after opposing the expansion of the state's school voucher program. Seal easily won the general election with 83.6% of the vote.

=== Republican primary ===
==== Candidates ====
- Frank Niceley, incumbent senator
- Jessie Seal, public relations director

==== Endorsements ====
Frank Niceley

Organizations

- NRA-PVF

==== Results ====
Results by county: Seal: 50–60% 60–70% 70–80%; Niceley: 50–60%

Note: This includes the write-in totals in only Union and Sevier County.

Republican primary
Party	Candidate	Votes	%
Republican	Jessie Seal	10,200	55.59%
Republican	Frank Niceley (incumbent)	8,132	44.32%
Write-in		16	0.09%
Total votes		18,348	100.00%

=== Democratic primary ===
==== Candidates ====
- R.E. Ellison, software developer

==== Results ====
Note: This includes the write-in totals in only Union and Sevier County.

Democratic primary
Party	Candidate	Votes	%
Democratic	R. E. Ellison	1,453	99.38%
Write-in		9	0.62%
Total votes		1,462	100.00%

=== General election ===
Tennessee's 8th Senate district general election, 2024
Party	Candidate	Votes	%
Republican	Jessie Seal	74,602	83.56%
Democratic	R. E. Ellison	14,678	16.44%
Total votes		89,280	100.00%

== District 10 ==
2024 Tennessee's 10th Senate district election
- November 5, 2024
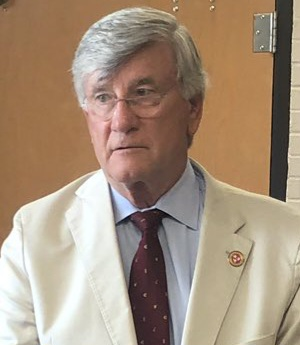

Nominee	Todd Gardenhire	Missy Crutchfield
Party	Republican	Democratic
Popular vote	54,521	34,536
Percentage	61.22%	38.78%
- County results Gardenhire: 50–60% 70–80% 80–90%
Senator before election
Todd Gardenhire
Republican
Elected Senator
Todd Gardenhire
Republican

The 10th senate district covers all of Bledsoe, Marion, and Sequatchi counties, including part of Hamilton County. The district had been represented by Todd Gardenhire.

During the 2022 redistricting cycle, maps enacted by the Tennessee General Assembly significantly altered Senate District 10. Bradley County was removed, which had previously helped anchor the district’s Republican lean, while boundaries within Hamilton County were adjusted to shift some Democratic areas of East Chattanooga into neighboring District 11. These changes made this portion of Hamilton County more competitive, while the addition of the reliably Republican counties of Bledsoe County, Marion County, and Sequatchie County strengthened the district’s overall Republican lean compared to the previous lines.

Todd Gardenhire won re-election with 61.2% of the vote, defeating his Democratic opponent Missy Crutchfield. Gardenhire won the district's portion of Hamilton County by 7%.

=== Republican primary ===
==== Candidates ====
- Todd Gardenhire, incumbent Senator
- Edward (Ed) LeCompte, former Red Bank city commissioner

==== Results ====
Note: This includes the write-in totals in only Hamilton County.

Republican primary
Party	Candidate	Votes	%
Republican	Todd Gardenhire (incumbent)	8,765	80.58%
Republican	Edward LeCompte	2,077	19.10%
Write-in		35	0.32%
Total votes		10,877	100.00%

=== Democratic primary ===
==== Candidates ====
- Missy Crutchfield, activist and daughter of former state senator Ward Crutchfield

==== Results ====
Note: This includes the write-in totals in only Hamilton County.

Democratic primary
Party	Candidate	Votes	%
Democratic	Missy Crutchfield	5,951	97.75%
Write-in		137	2.25%
Total votes		6,088	100.00%

=== General election ===
Tennessee's 10th Senate district general election, 2024
Party	Candidate	Votes	%
Republican	Todd Gardenhire (incumbent)	54,521	61.22%
Democratic	Missy Crutchfield	34,536	38.78%
Total votes		89,057	100.00%

== District 12 ==
2024 Tennessee's 12th Senate district election
- November 5, 2024
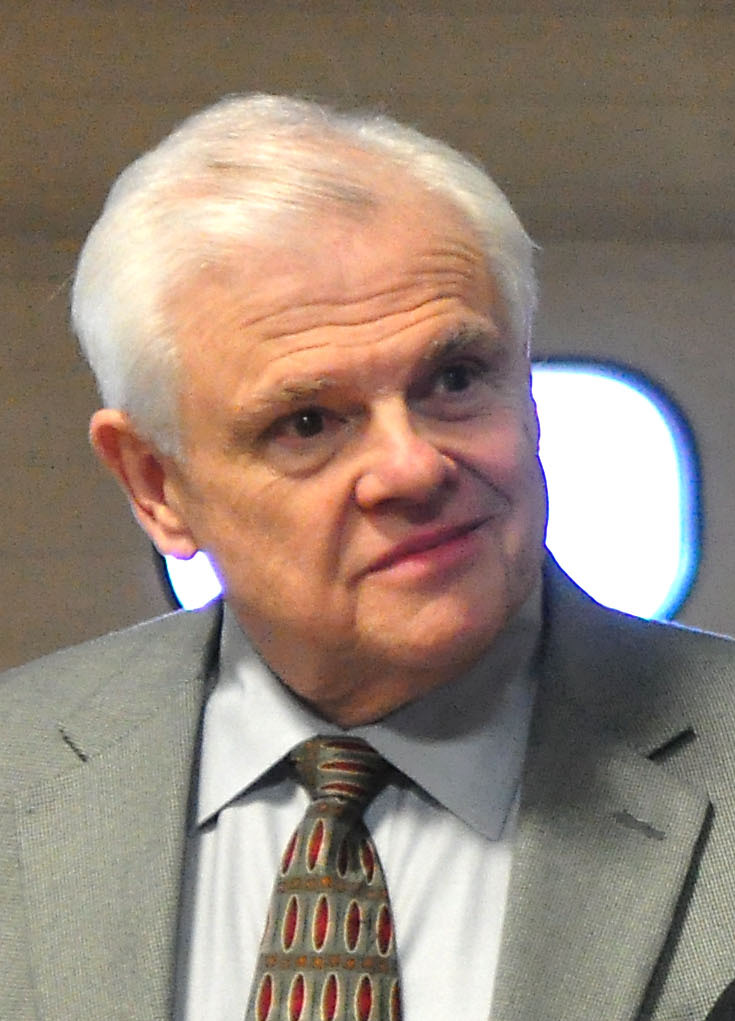

Nominee	Ken Yager	Charles Hutson II
Party	Republican	Independent
Popular vote	77,286	12,954
Percentage	85.64%	14.36%
- County results Yager: 80–90% >90%
Senator before election
Ken Yager
Republican
Elected Senator
Ken Yager
Republican

The 12th senate district covers Campbell, Clay, Fentress, Macon, Morgan, Overton, Pickett, Roane, and Scott Counties. The district had been represented by Republican Ken Yager.

Note: Only four counties — Clay, Macon, Overton, and Roane — have released write-in totals for the primary.

=== Republican primary ===
==== Candidates ====
- Ken Yager, incumbent Senator
- Teena Hedrick, nurse

==== Results ====
Republican primary
Party	Candidate	Votes	%
Republican	Ken Yager (incumbent)	15,654	77.32%
Republican	Teena Hedrick	4,587	22.66%
Write-in		6	0.03%
Total votes		20,247	100.00%

=== Democratic primary ===
==== Candidates ====
- Curtis Kelly

==== Results ====
Democratic primary
Party	Candidate	Votes	%
Democratic	Curtis Kelly	2,933	99.86%
Write-in		4	0.14%
Total votes		2,937	100.00%

=== Independent candidates ===
- Charles Hutson II

=== General election ===
Tennessee's 12th Senate district general election, 2024
Party	Candidate	Votes	%
Republican	Ken Yager (incumbent)	77,286	85.64%
Independent	Charles Hutson II	12,954	14.36%
Total votes		90,240	100.00%

== District 14 ==
2024 Tennessee's 14th Senate district election
- November 5, 2024
Nominee	Shane Reeves	E. R. Smith
Party	Republican	Democratic
Popular vote	48,964	23,055
Percentage	67.99%	32.01%
- County results Reeves: 50–60% 80–90%
Senator before election
Shane Reeves
Republican
Elected Senator
Shane Reeves
Republican

The 14th senate district covers Bedford, Cannon, and Moore counties, including part of part of Rutherford County. The district had been represented by Republican Shane Reeves.

During the 2022 redistricting cycle, the district’s boundaries were adjusted, though its overall partisan alignment did not change drastically. Lincoln County and Marshall County were removed, while Cannon County was added, and the district took in more Democratic-leaning areas of Rutherford County, including much of La Vergne and more Democratic parts of Murfreesboro. These changes slightly reduced the district’s Republican margin, though it remained a solidly Republican seat.

Shane Reeves won re-election with 68.0% of the vote, defeating Democratic nominee E. R. Smith. Although redistricting made the district’s portion of Rutherford County less Republican-leaning, Reeves still carried that area by a comfortable margin, winning it 58.8%–41.2%.

=== Republican primary ===
==== Candidates ====
- Shane Reeves, incumbent Senator

==== Results ====
Republican primary
Party	Candidate	Votes	%
Republican	Shane Reeves (incumbent)	7,091	100.00%
Total votes		7,091	100.00%

=== Democratic primary ===
==== Candidates ====
- E. R. Smith

==== Results ====
Democratic primary
Party	Candidate	Votes	%
Democratic	E. R. Smith	2,872	100.00%
Total votes		2,872	100.00%

=== General election ===
Tennessee's 14th Senate district general election, 2024
Party	Candidate	Votes	%
Republican	Shane Reeves (incumbent)	48,964	67.99%
Democratic	E. R. Smith	23,055	32.01%
Total votes		72,019	100.00%

== District 16 ==
2024 Tennessee's 16th Senate district election
- November 5, 2024
Nominee	Janice Bowling	Wayne Steele	Scott Bean
Party	Republican	Democratic	Independent
Popular vote	66,356	15,916	5,103
Percentage	75.94%	18.22%	5.84%
- County results Bowling: 70–80% 80–90%
Senator before election
Janice Bowling
Republican
Elected Senator
Janice Bowling
Republican

The 16th senate district covers Coffee, DeKalb, Franklin, Grundy, Lincoln, and Warren counties. The district had been represented by Republican Janice Bowling.

=== Republican primary ===
==== Candidates ====
- Janice Bowling , incumbent Senator

==== Results ====
Republican primary
Party	Candidate	Votes	%
Republican	Janice Bowling (incumbent)	14,896	100.00%
Total votes		14,896	100.00%

=== Democratic primary ===
==== Candidates ====
- Wayne Steele, Democratic nominee for Tennessee's 4th congressional district in 2022.

==== Results ====
Democratic primary
Party	Candidate	Votes	%
Democratic	Wayne Steele	3,051	100.00%
Total votes		3,051	100.00%

=== Independent candidates ===
- Scott Bean

=== General election ===
Tennessee's 16th Senate district general election, 2024
Party	Candidate	Votes	%
Republican	Janice Bowling (incumbent)	66,356	75.94%
Democratic	Wayne Steele	15,916	18.22%
Independent	Scott Bean	5,103	5.84%
Total votes		87,375	100.00%

== District 18 ==
2024 Tennessee's 18th Senate district election
- November 5, 2024
Nominee	Ferrell Haile	Walter Chandler
Party	Republican	Democratic
Popular vote	64,367	23,524
Percentage	67.60%	24.70%
- County results Haile: 60–70% 70–80%
Senator before election
Ferrell Haile
Republican
Elected Senator
Ferrell Haile
Republican

The 18th senate district is based in Sumner and Trousdale Counties. The district had been represented by Republican and Senate President Ferrell Haile.

=== Republican primary ===
==== Candidates ====
- Ferrell Haile, incumbent senator
- Chris Spencer, former Hendersonville alderman candidate and co-founder of the Sumner County Constitutional Republicans

==== Endorsements ====
Ferrell Haile

State-level officials

- Bill Lee, 50th Governor of Tennessee (2019-present)
- Randy McNally, Lieutenant Governor of Tennessee (2017-present)

==== Results ====
Republican primary
Party	Candidate	Votes	%
Republican	Ferrell Haile (incumbent)	9,684	59.17%
Republican	Chris Spencer	6,683	40.83%
Total votes		16,367	100.00%

=== Democratic primary ===
==== Candidates ====
- Walter S. Chandler, entrepreneur

==== Results ====
Democratic primary
Party	Candidate	Votes	%
Democratic	Walter S. Chandler	3,194	100.00%
Total votes		3,194	100.00%

=== Independent candidates ===
- Laura A. Black
- John Gentry

=== General election ===
Tennessee's 18th Senate district general election, 2024
Party	Candidate	Votes	%
Republican	Ferrell Haile (incumbent)	64,367	67.60%
Democratic	Walter S. Chandler	23,524	24.70%
Independent	John Gentry	3,956	4.15%
Independent	Laura A. Black	3,375	3.54%
Total votes		95,222	100.00%

== District 20 ==
2024 Tennessee's 20th Senate district election
- November 5, 2024
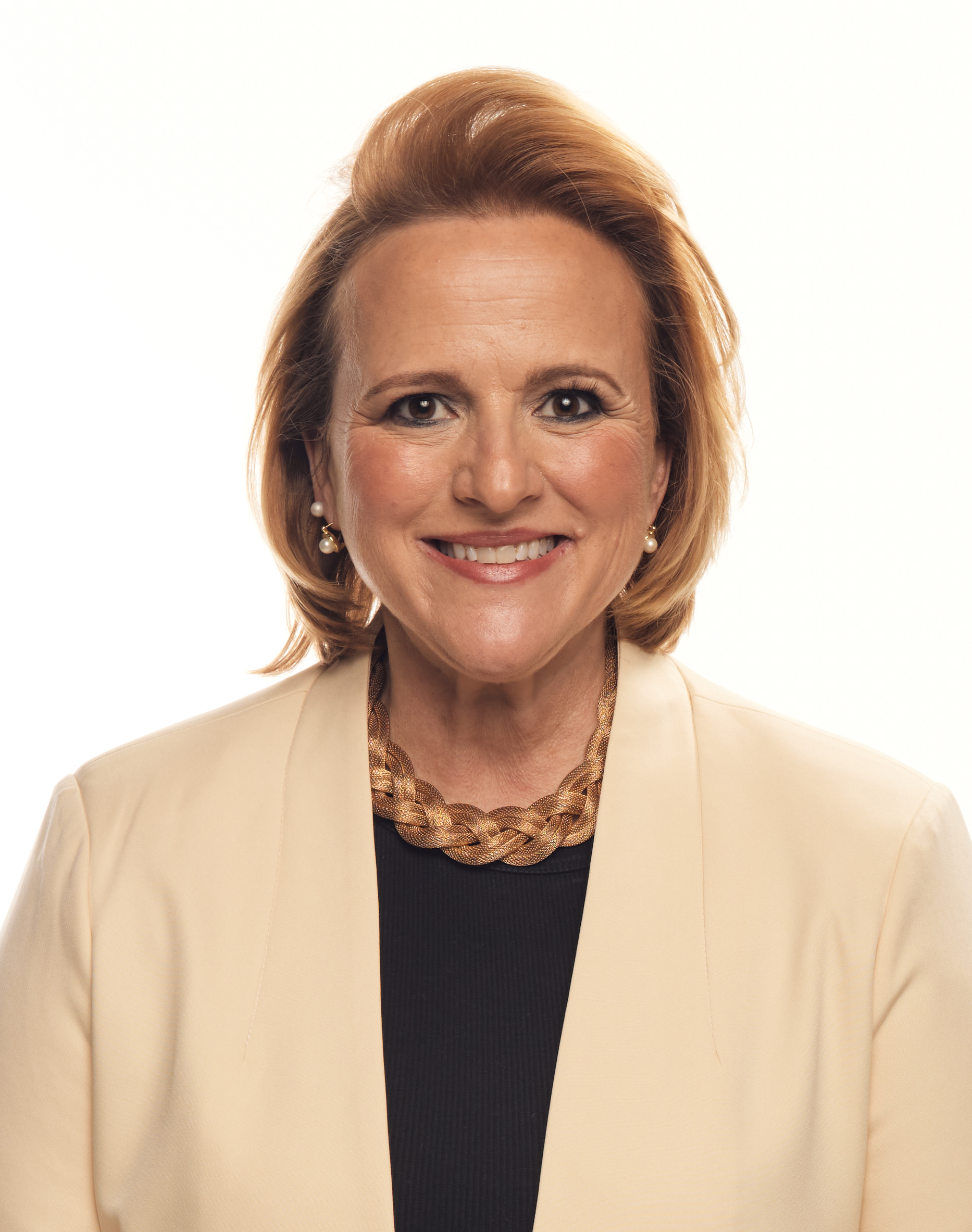

Nominee	Heidi Campbell	Wyatt Rampy
Party	Democratic	Republican
Popular vote	63,353	46,997
Percentage	57.41%	42.59%
- Precinct results Campbell: 50–60% 60–70% 70–80% 80–90% Rampy: 50–60% 60–70% 70–80% >90% No data
Senator before election
Heidi Campbell
Democratic
Elected Senator
Heidi Campbell
Democratic

The 20th senate district is based in Davidson County, and encompasses many of Nashville's wealthy inner suburbs, including Forest Hills, Belle Meade, and parts of Oak Hill and Goodlettsville. The district had been represented by Democrat Heidi Campbell.

During the 2022 redistricting cycle, Tennessee’s Republican controlled Legislature enacted new state legislative maps that affected Senate District 20. As part of the reconfiguration of Davidson County, District 20 was adjusted to allow District 17 to extend into Davidson and take in areas such as the Nashville International Airport. This adjustment added more Democratic friendly precincts to District 20. Civil rights groups criticized the overall changes as diluting minority voting strength, while courts later dismissed the related legal challenge.

=== Democratic primary ===
==== Candidates ====
- Heidi Campbell, incumbent Senator

==== Results ====
Democratic primary
Party	Candidate	Votes	%
Democratic	Heidi Campbell (incumbent)	17,145	100.00%
Total votes		17,145	100.00%

=== Republican primary ===
==== Candidates ====
- Wyatt Rampy, candidate for Tennessee's 59th House district in 2022

==== Results ====
Republican primary
Party	Candidate	Votes	%
Republican	Wyatt Rampy	8,808	100.00%
Total votes		8,808	100.00%

=== General Election ===
Tennessee's 20th Senate district general election, 2024
Party	Candidate	Votes	%
Democratic	Heidi Campbell (incumbent)	63,353	57.41%
Republican	Wyatt Rampy	46,997	42.59%
Total votes		110,350	100.00%

== District 22 ==
2024 Tennessee's 22nd Senate district election
- November 5, 2024
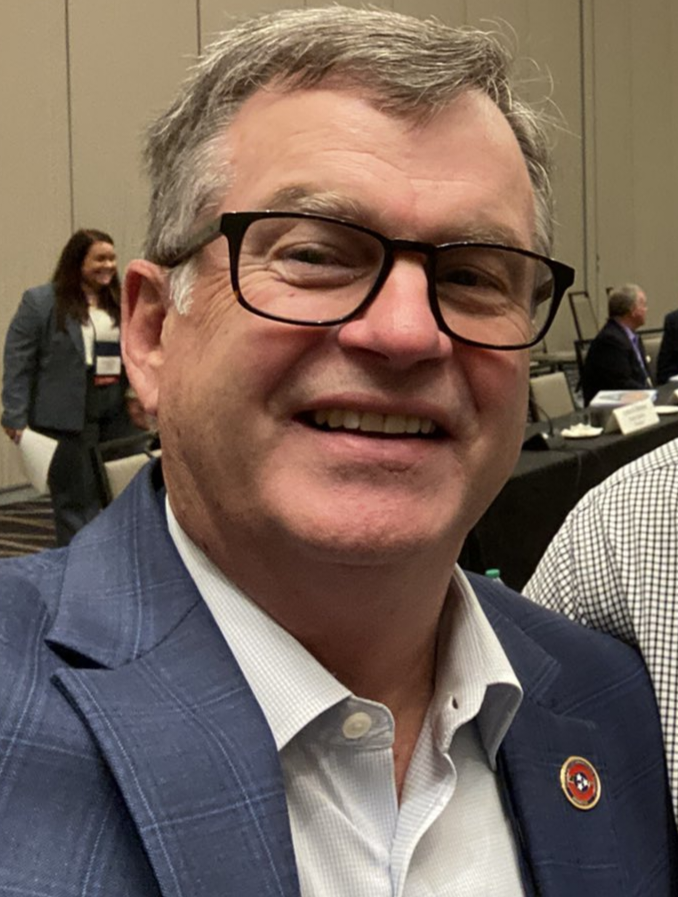

Nominee	Bill Powers	Karen Reynolds
Party	Republican	Democratic
Popular vote	45,571	29,180
Percentage	60.96%	39.04%
- Precinct results Powers: 50–60% 60–70% 70–80% 80–90% Reynolds: 50–60%
Senator before election
Bill Powers
Republican
Elected Senator
Bill Powers
Republican

The 22nd senate district is based in Clarksville, and covers most of Montgomery County. The district had been represented by Republican Bill Powers.

Following the 2022 redistricting cycle, population growth in Montgomery County led to the district’s boundaries shrinking. Houston and Stewart counties were removed and assigned to neighboring District 24, while a precinct in northeastern Montgomery County was transferred to District 23.

=== Republican primary ===
==== Candidates ====
- Bill Powers, incumbent Senator

==== Results ====
Republican primary
Party	Candidate	Votes	%
Republican	Bill Powers (incumbent)	7,718	100.00%
Total votes		7,718	100.00%

=== Democratic primary ===
==== Candidates ====
- Karen Reynolds, Clarksville city councillor for ward 9

==== Results ====
Democratic primary
Party	Candidate	Votes	%
Democratic	Karen Reynolds	3,797	100.00%
Total votes		3,797	100.00%

=== General election ===
Tennessee's 22nd Senate district general election, 2024
Party	Candidate	Votes	%
Republican	Bill Powers (incumbent)	45,571	60.96%
Democratic	Karen Reynolds	29,180	39.04%
Total votes		74,751	100.00%

== District 24 ==
2024 Tennessee's 24th Senate district election
- November 5, 2024
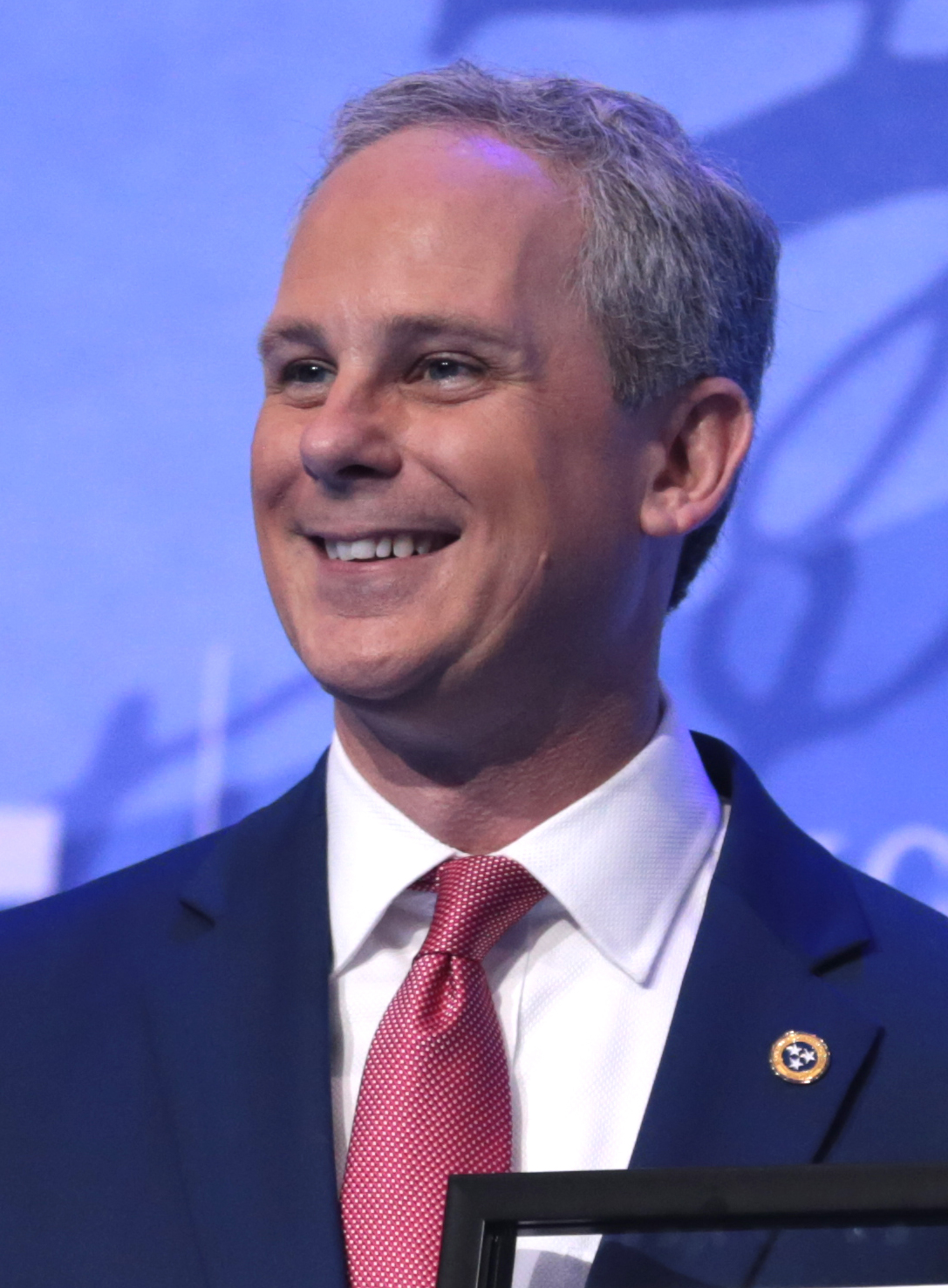
Nominee	John Stevens
Party	Republican
Popular vote	72,507
Percentage	100.00%
- County results Stevens: >90%
Senator before election
John Stevens
Republican
Elected Senator
John Stevens
Republican

The 24th district covers all of all of Benton, Carroll, Gibson, Henry, Houston, Obion, Stewart, and Weakley counties. The district had been represented by Republican John Stevens since 2017.

=== Republican primary ===
==== Candidates ====
- John Stevens, incumbent Senator
- Charles "Charlie" Cooper, chairman of the Benton County Republican Party

==== Results ====
Republican primary
Party	Candidate	Votes	%
Republican	John Stevens (incumbent)	12,486	75.03%
Republican	Charles Cooper	4,155	24.97%
Total votes		16,641	100.00%

=== General election ===
As no Democratic or independent candidates ran in the district, Stevens ran unopposed in the general election.

Tennessee's 24th Senate district general election, 2024
Party	Candidate	Votes	%
Republican	John Stevens (incumbent)	72,507	100.00%
Total votes		72,507	100.00%

== District 26 ==
2024 Tennessee's 26th Senate district election
- November 5, 2024
Nominee	Page Walley
Party	Republican
Popular vote	74,214
Percentage	99.99%
- County results Walley: >90%
Senator before election
Page Walley
Republican
Elected Senator
Page Walley
Republican

The 26th district covers all of all of Chester, Fayette, Hardeman, Hardin, Haywood, Lawrence, McNairy, and Wayne Counties. The district had been represented by Republican Page Walley since 2021.

=== Republican primary ===
==== Candidates ====
- Page Walley, incumbent Senator

==== Results ====
Republican primary
Party	Candidate	Votes	%
Republican	Page Walley (incumbent)	10,573	100.00%
Total votes		10,573	100.00%

=== General election ===
As no Democratic or independent candidates ran in the district, Walley ran unopposed in the general election.

Tennessee's 26th Senate district general election, 2024
Party	Candidate	Votes	%
Republican	Page Walley (incumbent)	74,214	99.99%
Write-in	James Gray	11	0.01%
Total votes		74,225	100.00%

== District 28 ==
2024 Tennessee's 28th Senate district election
- November 5, 2024
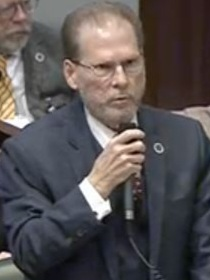

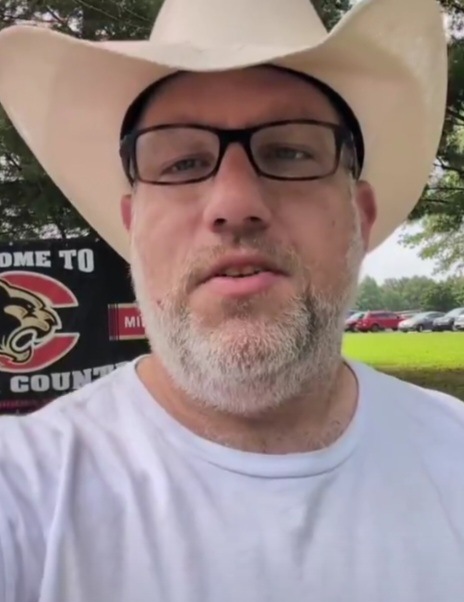
Nominee	Joey Hensley	James Dallas
Party	Republican	Democratic
Popular vote	74,286	25,086
Percentage	74.76%	25.24%
- County results Hensley: 60–70% 70–80% 80–90%
Senator before election
Joey Hensley
Republican
Elected Senator
Joey Hensley
Republican

The 28th Senate district includes Maury, Marshall, Lewis, and Giles counties, as well part of Williamson County. The district had been represented by Joey Hensley.

=== Republican primary ===
==== Candidates ====
- Joey Hensley, incumbent senator

==== Results ====
Republican primary
Party	Candidate	Votes	%
Republican	Joey Hensley (incumbent)	16,641	100.00%
Total votes		16,641	100.00%

=== Democratic primary ===
==== Candidates ====
- James Dallas, chairman of the Maury County Democratic Party

==== Results ====
Democratic primary
Party	Candidate	Votes	%
Democratic	James Dallas	3,874	100.00%
Total votes		3,874	100.00%

=== General election ===
Tennessee's 28th Senate district general election, 2024
Party	Candidate	Votes	%
Republican	Joey Hensley (incumbent)	74,286	74.76%
Democratic	James Dallas	25,086	25.24%
Total votes		99,372	100.00%

== District 30 ==
2024 Tennessee's 30th Senate district election
- November 5, 2024
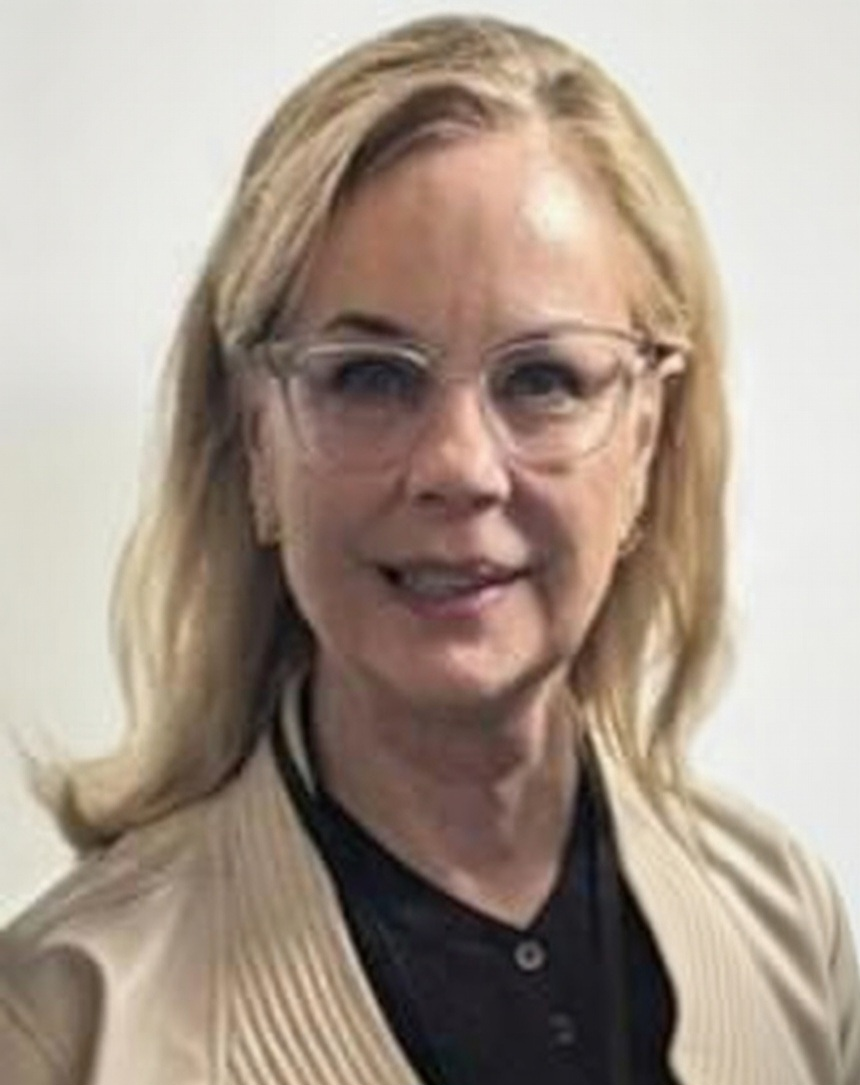

Nominee	Sara Kyle	Mitchell Morrison
Party	Democratic	Independent
Popular vote	40,232	10,370
Percentage	79.14%	20.40%
- Kyle: 50–60% 60–70% 70–80% 80–90% >90%
Senator before election
Sara Kyle
Democratic
Elected Senator
Sara Kyle
Democratic

The 30th Senate district is based in Memphis, covering much of the city's Downtown, North, and East neighborhoods. The district had been represented by Sara Kyle.

=== Democratic primary ===
==== Candidates ====
- Sara Kyle, incumbent senator

==== Results ====
Democratic primary
Party	Candidate	Votes	%
Democratic	Sara Kyle (incumbent)	6,764	68.19%
Democratic	M. LaTroy Williams	3,156	31.81%
Total votes		9,920	100.00%

=== Independent candidates ===
- Mitchell Morrison

=== General election ===
Tennessee's 30th Senate district general election, 2024
Party	Candidate	Votes	%
Democratic	Sara Kyle (incumbent)	40,232	79.14%
Independent	Mitchell Morrison	10,370	20.40%
Write-in		235	0.46%
Total votes		50,837	100.00%

== District 32 ==
2024 Tennessee's 32nd Senate district election
- November 5, 2024
Nominee	Paul Rose
Party	Republican
Popular vote	55,896
Percentage	97.70%
- County results Rose: >90%
Senator before election
Paul Rose
Republican
Elected Senator
Paul Rose
Republican

The 32nd Senate district is based in the eastern and northern suburbs of Memphis in Shelby as well as Lauderdale and Tipton Counties, covering parts of Memphis proper as well as Covington, Atoka, Munford, and most of Bartlett. The district had been represented by Paul Rose.

=== Republican primary ===
==== Candidates ====
- Paul Rose, incumbent senator

==== Results ====
Republican primary
Party	Candidate	Votes	%
Republican	Paul Rose (incumbent)	8,955	100.00%
Total votes		8,955	100.00%

=== General election ===
As no Democratic or independent candidates ran in the district, Rose ran unopposed in the general election.

Tennessee's 32nd Senate district general election, 2024
Party	Candidate	Votes	%
Republican	Paul Rose (incumbent)	55,896	97.70%
Write-in		1,318	2.30%
Total votes		57,214	100.00%

== See also ==
- 2024 Tennessee elections
- 2024 Tennessee House of Representatives election
- List of Tennessee General Assemblies
