= Tennessee Republican Party =

Tennessee affiliate of the U.S. Republican Party

- Chairperson: Scott Golden
- Governor of Tennessee: Bill Lee
- Senate Leader: Lt. Gov. Randy McNally
- House Leader: Speaker Cameron Sexton
- Headquarters: 95 White Bridge Road, Suite 414; Nashville, Tennessee 37205
- Ideology: Conservatism
- National affiliation: Republican Party
- Colors: Red (unofficial)
- United States Senate delegation: 2 / 2
- United States House of Representatives delegation: 8 / 9
- Seats in the Tennessee State Senate: 27 / 33
- Seats in the Tennessee House of Representatives: 75 / 99

Election symbol

Website
- tngop.org

The Tennessee Republican Party (TRP or TNGOP) is the affiliate of the United States Republican Party in Tennessee. Since the mid-1960s, the state has become increasingly Republican. The current chairman of the Republican Party of Tennessee is Scott Golden. It is currently the dominant party in the state, controlling all but one of Tennessee's nine U.S. House seats, both U.S. Senate seats, the governorship, and has supermajorities in both houses of the state legislature. As of 2026 Tennessee was the 10th most pro-republican voting state according to the Cook Partisan Voting Index.

== History ==
Upon its entry into the Union in 1796, Tennessee was strongly Democratic-Republican. Tennessee became a two-party system for more than 20 years during the Jacksonian era. The Democratic Party was formed by Jackson followers, and this party was dominant against the rival Whig Party led by Henry Clay. But in 1835, there was a turn in power of party, and a Whig governor was elected. Tennessee, after the American Civil War was part of the Democratic South for about a century. East Tennessee, however, remained strongly Republican. Even though the state was predominantly Democratic, two different presidential elections won the state of Tennessee in 1920 and 1928. In the 1960s and 1970s Republicans made a push into the Democratic power when, in 1966, Howard Baker was elected US senator. Then again Republicans made another push when Winfield Dunn was elected governor, the first Republican Governor in over 50 years.

Republicans rarely held seats in the U.S. House from the South during the Solid South period with the party only holding two seats in Tennessee between 1947 and 1952, out of the 105 seats in the south. Republicans won 80 of 2,565 congressional elections in the south during the first half of the 20th century. 50 of these victories were in eastern Tennessee.

== Leadership and staff ==
The Tennessee Republican Party has had five chairmen since 2005. On December 11, 2004, the State Executive Committee unanimously elected Bob Davis as Chairman of the Tennessee Republican Party to serve for the calendar years 2005 and 2006. He was subsequently elected to a second two-year term, 2007 and 2008, but resigned from the chairmanship in August 2007 to become Senior Adviser to presidential candidate Fred Thompson. The party's State Executive Committee then chose Robin Smith, former chairman of the Hamilton County Republican Party and vice chairman of the Tennessee GOP under Davis, to complete Davis's two-year term.

Republicans won a victory in Tennessee's 2008 elections, when the party won majorities in both houses of the Tennessee General Assembly for the first time since the Reconstruction Era election of 1868. Smith was unanimously re-elected at the end of 2008 to a full two-year term as chairman for calendar years 2009 and 2010. In April 2009, Smith announced her resignation in order to run for Congress in Tennessee's 3rd congressional district in the August 2010 Republican primary.

=== Staff ===
The Chairman of the Republican Party of Tennessee is Scott Golden, who was elected on December 3, 2016.

== Current elected officials ==
The Tennessee Republican Party controls the governor's office and a supermajority in the Tennessee Senate and the Tennessee House of Representatives. Republicans hold both of the state's U.S. Senate seats and 8 of the state's 9 U.S. House seats.

=== Members of Congress ===
==== U.S. Senate ====
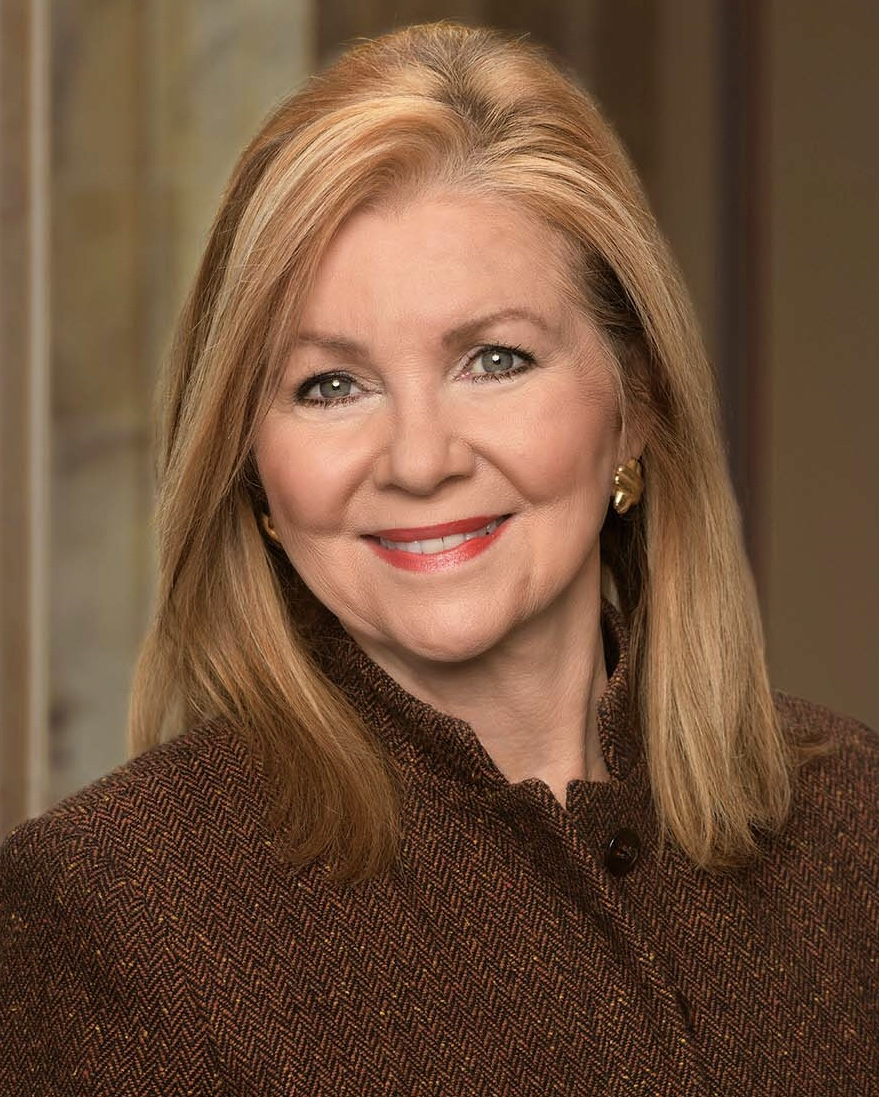
Senior U.S. Senator Marsha Blackburn

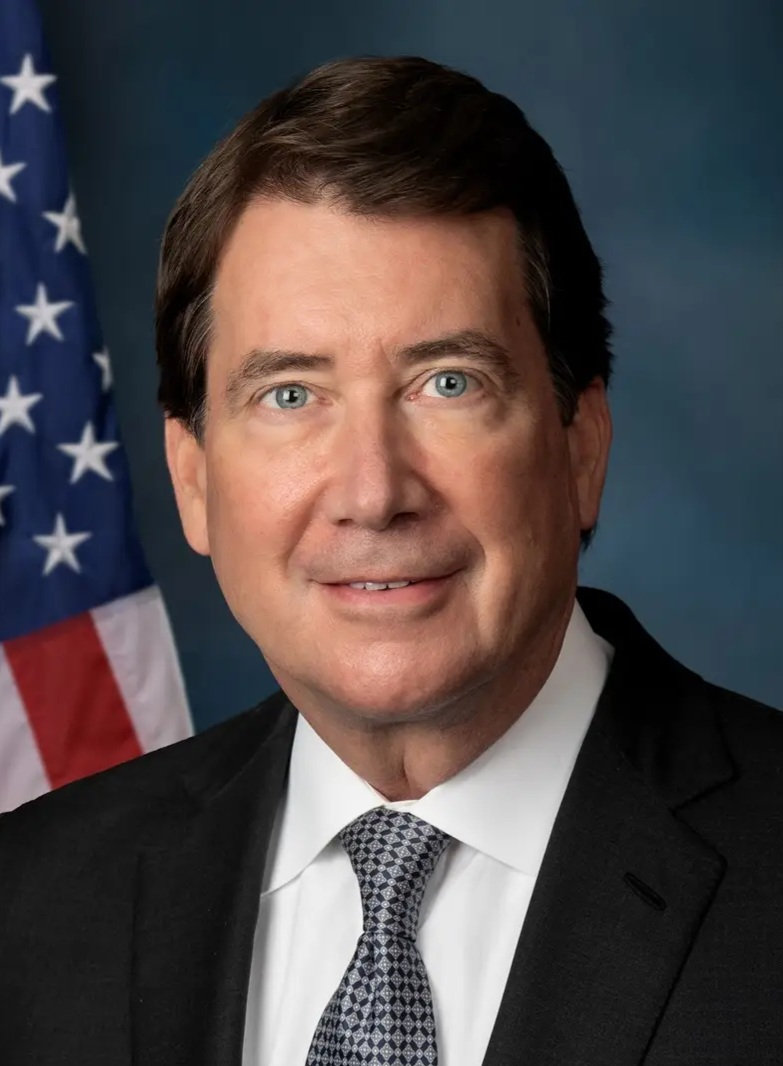
Junior U.S. Senator Bill Hagerty

==== U.S. House of Representatives ====
Tennessee Democratic Congressional Delegation
District	Member	Photo
1st	Diana Harshbarger	
2nd	Tim Burchett	
3rd	Chuck Fleischmann	
4th	Scott DesJarlais	
5th	Andy Ogles	
5th	Charlie Hatcher (elect)	
6th	John Rose	
6th	Johnny Garrett (elect)	
7th	Matt Van Epps	
8th	David Kustoff	
9th	Brent Taylor (elect)	

=== Statewide offices ===
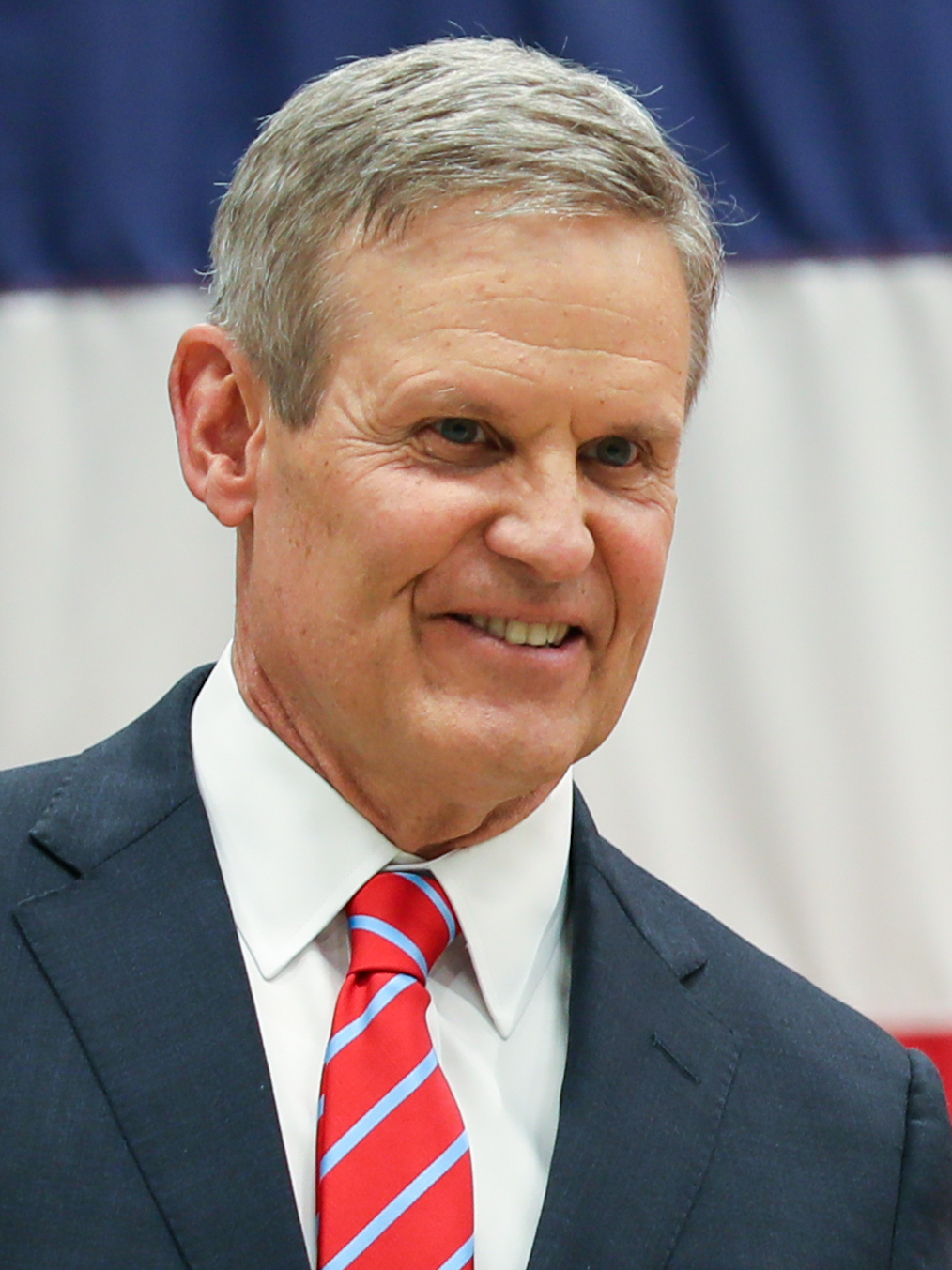
Governor Bill Lee

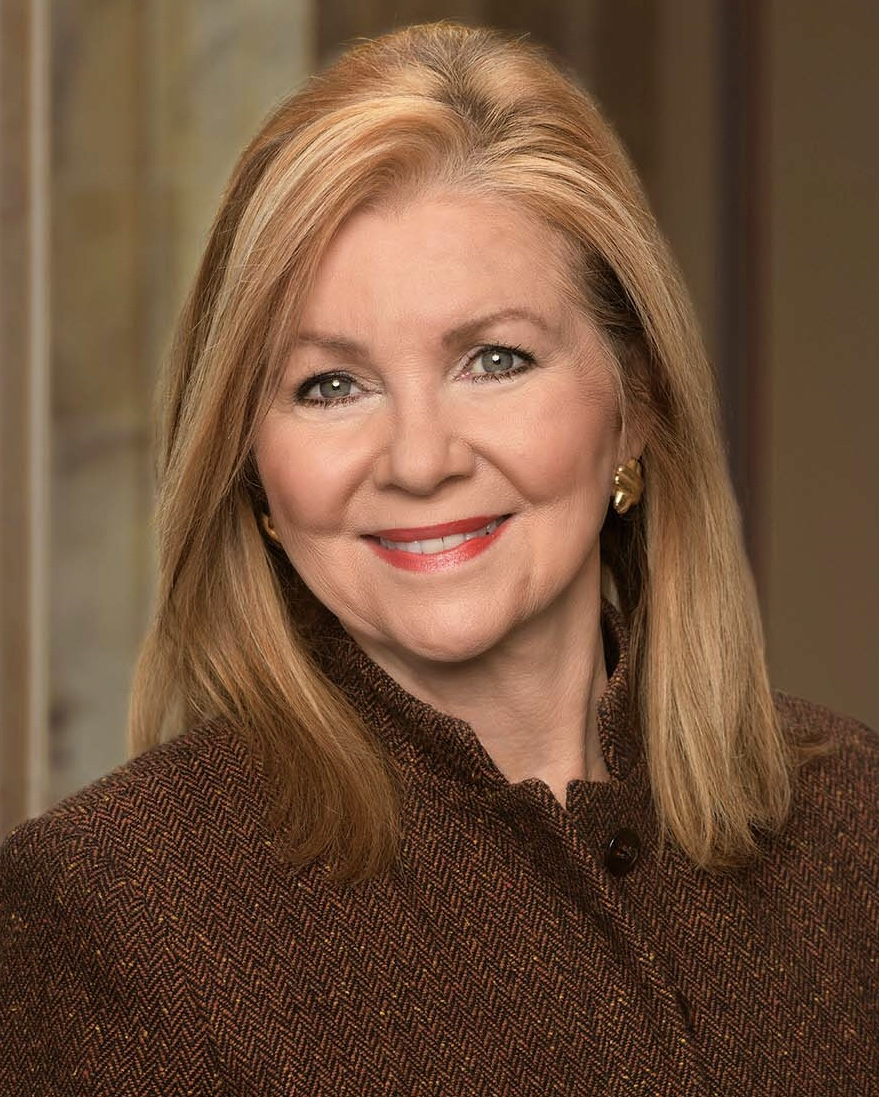
Governor-elect Marsha Blackburn

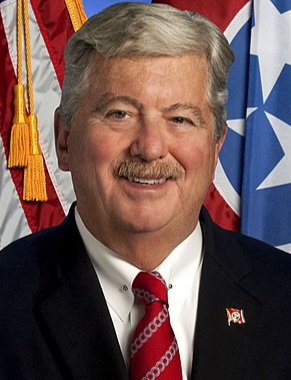
Lieutenant Governor Randy McNally

=== Legislative leadership ===
- Speaker of the Senate/Lt. Governor: Randy McNally
- Speaker of the House: Cameron Sexton

=== Tennessee state senate ===
As of 2025:

- J. Adam Lowe - District 1
- Tom Hatcher - District 2
- Rusty Crowe - District 3
- Bobby Harshbarger - District 4
- Lt. Gov. Randy McNally - District 5
- Becky Duncan Massey - District 6
- Richard Briggs - District 7
- Jessie Seal - District 8
- Steve Southerland - District 9
- Todd Gardenhire - District 10
- Bo Watson - District 11
- Ken Yager - District 12
- Dawn White - District 13
- Shane Reeves - District 14
- Paul Bailey - District 15
- Janice Bowling - District 16
- Mark Pody - District 17
- Ferrell Haile - District 18
- Bill Powers - District 22
- Kerry Roberts - District 23
- John Stevens - District 24
- Ed Jackson - District 25
- Page Walley - District 26
- Jack Johnson - District 27
- Joey Hensley - District 28
- Brent Taylor - District 31
- Paul Rose - District 32

=== Tennessee state house ===
As of 2025:

- John Crawford - District 1
- Bud Hulsey - District 2
- Timothy Hill - District 3
- Renea Jones - District 4
- David Hawk - District 5
- Tim Hicks - District 6
- Rebecca Alexander - District 7
- Jerome Moon - District 8
- Gary Hicks - District 9
- Rick Eldridge - District 10
- Jeremy Faison - District 11
- Fred Atchley - District 12
- Robert Stevens - District 13
- Jason Zachary - District 14
- Michele Carringer - District 16
- Andrew Farmer - District 17
- Elaine Davis - District 18
- Dave Wright - District 19
- Tom Stinnett - District 20
- Lowell Russell - District 21
- Dan Howell - District 22
- Mark Cochran - District 23
- Kevin Raper - District 24
- Speaker Cameron Sexton - District 25
- Greg Martin - District 26
- Michele Reneau - District 27
- Greg Vital - District 29
- Esther Helton - District 30
- Ron Travis - District 31
- Monty Fritts - District 32
- Rick Scarbrough - District 33
- Tim Rudd - District 34
- William Slater - District 35
- Dennis Powers - District 36
- Charlie Baum - District 37
- Kelly Keisling - District 38
- Iris Rudder - District 39
- Michael Hale - District 40
- Ed Butler - District 41
- Ryan Williams - District 42
- Paul Sherrell - District 43
- William Lamberth - District 44
- Johnny Garrett - District 45
- Clark Boyd - District 46
- Rush Bricken - District 47
- Bryan Terry - District 48
- Mike Sparks - District 49
- Susan Lynn - District 57
- Gino Bulso - District 61
- Pat Marsh - District 62
- Jake McCalmon - District 63
- Scott Cepicky - District 64
- Lee Reeves - District 65
- Sabi "Doc" Kumar - District 66
- Aron Maberry - District 68
- Jody Barrett - District 69
- Clay Doggett - District 70
- Kip Capley - District 71
- Kirk Haston - District 72
- Chris Todd - District 73
- Jay Reedy - District 74
- Michael Lankford - District 75
- Tandy Darby - District 76
- Rusty Grills - District 77
- Mary Littleton - District 78
- Brock Martin - District 79
- Debra Moody - District 81
- Chris Hurt - District 82
- Mark White - District 83
- Justin Lafferty - District 89
- Todd Warner - District 92
- Ron Gant - District 94
- Kevin Vaughan - District 95
- John Gillespie - District 97
- Tom Leatherwood - District 99

== Current structure ==
Here is the structure of the party as of December 2011

=== Elected officers of the state committee ===
- State Chairman
- Vice-chairman
- Secretary
- Treasurer
- Vice-Treasurer
- National Committeewoman
- National Committeeman
- General Counsel

=== State executive committee ===
The state executive committee (SEC) operates as the governing body for the state party. They establish rules and measures that best promote the success of the Republican Party and the broadening of its base. The SEC serves as the TRP's state primary board and establishes to guide and direct County Republican Parties. One man and one woman are elected from each state senate district.

- 33 districts
- 66 total representatives of the TRP
- 33 are male
- 33 are female

== Coalitions ==
- African American Development Council
- College Republicans
- Republican Jewish Coalition
- Republican National Hispanic Assembly of Tennessee
- Teenage Republicans
- Young Republicans
- Tennessee Federation of Republican Women

== Electoral achievements ==
=== Government trifecta ===
In the 2010 Tennessee gubernatorial election, Republican nominee Bill Haslam flipped the governors seat. With the state legislature also being controlled by Republicans, this established a historic Republican government trifecta for the first time since the reconstruction era election of 1869. Ever since this election, Republicans have maintained their trifecta, electing Republicans since then.

=== Legislative achievements ===
In 2008 Republicans won a historic victory when the party won majorities in both chambers of the Tennessee General Assembly for the first time since the reconstruction era election of 1868.

Since 2008, Republicans have maintained their majorities in both chambers and gained a historic Supermajority in both chambers in 2012.

=== Federal elections ===
Like other Southern states, before the 1960s, Tennessee was a solidly Democratic state. However, that started to change in the 1970s.

==== Presidential ====
Since 2000, Republicans have maintained their presidential election winning streak. The last time Tennessee voted for a Democratic presidential nominee was in 1996

==== U.S. legislative ====
Republicans have held hold both of the state's U.S. Senate seats since 1994. The current Republican senators are Marsha Blackburn and Bill Hagerty.

Republicans have also held a majority of U.S. House seats since 2010. The current delegation is an 8-1 Republican majority.

== Former Chairmen ==
- Guy Smith, editor of the Knoxville Journal, from 1948-1958
- Congressman Carroll Reece (R-Johnson City), from 1958 to 1961. Reece was Chair of the Republican National Committee from 1945-1948.
- Congressman Howard Baker, Sr. (R-Huntsville), from 1961 to 1962
- Erby Jenkins, from 1962 to 1963
- George Ed Wilson, from 1963 to 1964
- Harry Carbaugh, from 1964 to 1965
- Julius Hurst, the McNairy County Superintendent of Schools, was the first person from West Tennessee to chair the party and served from 1965 to 1966
- Ernest Koella, from 1966 to 1977
- Claude Robertson, from 1967 to 1969
- State Rep. Ed Bailey (R-Lexington) from 1969 to 1971
- S.L. “Kopie” Kopald, Jr., from 1971-1974
- Dortch Oldham, from 1974-1977.
- Thomas W. Beasley, from 1977 to 1981.
- Charles L. Overby, from 1981-1982.
- Susan Richardson Williams, from 1982 to 1984.
- State Rep Jim Henry (R-Kingston), from 1984 to 1988. Henry was also House Republican Leader from 1982 to 1988.
- Former State Rep. Brad Martin (R-Memphis), from 1988 to 1990.
- Tommy Hopper, 1990 to 1992.
- Randle Richardson, from 1992 to 1995.
- Jim Burnett, from 1995 to 1999.
- Chip Saltsman, from 1999 to 2001.
- Beth Harwell, from 2001 to 2004.
- Bob Davis, from 2005 to August 2007.
- Robin Smith, from August 4, 2007, to May 30, 2009.
- Chris Devaney, from 2009 to 2015
- Ryan Haynes, from 2015 to 2016.

== Past Republican governors ==
- Edward H. East 1865
- William G. Brownlow 1865–1869
- Dewitt C. Senter 1869–1871
- Alvin Hawkins 1881–1883
- Ben W. Hooper 1911–1915
- Alfred A. Taylor 1921–1923
- Winfield Dunn 1971–1975
- Lamar Alexander 1979–1987
- Don Sundquist 1995–2003
- Bill Haslam 2011–2019

== Notable Tennessee Republicans ==
- Fred Thompson
- Bill Frist
- Don Sundquist
- Howard Baker
- Bill Brock
- Winfield Dunn
- Lamar Alexander
- Bob Corker
- Kane (wrestler)

== Controversy and scandals ==
=== Controversies ===
In 2008, the Tennessee Republican Party issued a press release that featured a photo of Senator Obama dressed in traditional Kenya clothing that the TN GOP called "Muslim attire" and used Obama's middle name "Hussein." Both Senator John McCain and State Democratic Chairman Gray Sasser decried the press release.

=== Scandals ===
- In July 2009, state senator Paul Stanley resigned after being caught in a sexual relationship with a 22-year-old intern. Paul Stanley was known for running for family values. Stanley resigned because he wanted to focus more on his family and better that since his indiscretions. He was quoted saying, "And just because I fell far short of what God's standard was for me and my wife, doesn't mean that that standard is reduced in the least bit."
- Keith Westmoreland a Republican Tennessee State Representative, was arrested on 7 felony counts of lewd and exposing himself to girls under the age of 16. He committed suicide before he could be prosecuted.
- Operation Tennessee Waltz was a statewide bribery sting, where 3 Democratic Senators and 1 Republican Representative were either convicted or pleaded guilty. 8 other people also either pleaded guilty or were convicted.

== Electoral history ==
=== Gubernatorial ===
Tennessee Republican Party gubernatorial election results
Election	Gubernatorial candidate	Votes	Vote %	Result
1994	Don Sundquist	807,104	54.27%	Won ✓
1998	Don Sundquist	669,973	68.63%	Won ✓
2002	Van Hilleary	786,803	47.59%	Lost ✗
2006	Jim Bryson	540,853	29.74%	Lost ✗
2010	Bill Haslam	1,041,545	65.03%	Won ✓
2014	Bill Haslam	951,796	70.31%	Won ✓
2018	Bill Lee	1,336,106	59.56%	Won ✓
2022	Bill Lee	1,129,390	64.91%	Won ✓
2026	Marsha Blackburn	957,136	45.54%	Won ✓

== See also ==
- Tennessee Democratic Party
- Political party strength in Tennessee

== Works cited ==
- Black, Earl; Black, Merle (2002). The Rise of Southern Republicans. Harvard University Press. ISBN 067400728X.
- Moreland, Laurence; Steed, Robert; Baker, Tod, eds. (1991). The 1988 Presidential Election in the South: Continuity Amidst Change in Southern Party Politics. Praeger Publishers. ISBN 0275931455.
