= Senator Crutchfield =

Senator Crutchfield may refer to:

- Johnnie Crutchfield (born 1947), Oklahoma State Senate
- Ward Crutchfield (1928–2016), Tennessee State Senate
