= Rural Health Month =

Rural Health Month is celebrated in November in Australia and the United States.

== Australia ==
Rural Health Month was launched in Australia by Rural Health Pro, a social enterprise of RDN, in the year 2020. The event takes place annually in November and has been widely embraced by the rural health community as a time to acknowledge and celebrate the work of health professionals in remote, rural and regional health services.

RDN, an Australian charity for health access, conceived of the idea in 2019 as an opportunity for a multidisciplinary coming together of the rural health community for a series of educational and networking events events with a rural positive focus. In 2025, the National Rural Health Commissioner Professor Jenny May described the month as an opportunity for rural health professionals to access the professional support they need. "The power of connectedness is a vital ingredient in bringing our rural health community together," the Commissioner said.

Events taking place during Rural Health Month include the National Rural and Remote Health Awards. The Awards were inaugurated at Parliament House in 2023 by Rural Health Pro. The Awards celebrate the achievements of health professionals and organisations in rural and remote communities across Australia, including Aboriginal and Torres Strait Islander communities. Summing up the spirit of the Awards in her 2024 address at the ceremony, Governor-General Sam Mostyn said:

"Healthcare is so much more than just about treatment. It is education, it's prevention and management, it's project planning and execution, it's communication and collaboration, innovation and so much more. Yours are not just jobs, but vocations of care. Your work is essential to the wellbeing of all Australians and the prosperity and progress of our nation

— Ms Sam Mostyn, Governor-General of Australia, 2024 National Rural and Remote Health Awards

== United States ==
In the United States, Rural Health Month takes place in November, and includes National Rural Health Day. In November 2025, US Reps. Jill Tokuda (Hawaiʻi-02) and Diana Harshbarger (Tenn.-01), co-chairs of the Bipartisan Rural Health Caucus, led the US Congress in celebrating National Rural Health Day, highlighting the need to advance bipartisan policy to strengthen rural healthcare systems in America.
