= Ron Ramsey =

American politician (born 1955)

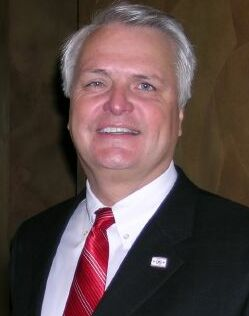
- Ramsey in 2006

49th Lieutenant Governor of Tennessee Speaker of the Tennessee Senate
- In office January 20, 2007 – January 9, 2017
- Governor: Phil Bredesen; Bill Haslam
- Preceded by: John Wilder
- Succeeded by: Randy McNally

Member of the Tennessee Senate from the 4th district
- In office January 1997 – January 9, 2017
- Preceded by: Jim Holcomb
- Succeeded by: Jon Lundberg

Member of the Tennessee House of Representatives from the 1st district
- In office January 1993 – January 1997
- Preceded by: Jim Holcomb
- Succeeded by: Steve Godsey

Personal details
- Born: Ronald Lynn Ramsey; November 20, 1955 (age 71) Johnson City, Tennessee, U.S.
- Party: Republican
- Spouse: Sindy Parker (m. 1980)
- Children: 3
- Education: East Tennessee State University (BS)

Ronald Lynn Ramsey (/ˈræmzi/; born November 20, 1955) is an American auctioneer, politician, and lobbyist, who served as the 49th lieutenant governor of Tennessee and speaker of the State Senate from 2007 to 2017. A Republican from Blountville in East Tennessee, Ramsey succeeded long-term Democratic Lieutenant Governor John S. Wilder in 2007, who had held the office of lieutenant governor since 1971.

Tennesseans do not elect their lieutenant governor; rather, the speaker of the Senate, who is first in the line of succession to the governor, is granted the title by statute. Ramsey is the first Republican Lieutenant Governor in Tennessee history, and unsuccessfully ran for Governor of Tennessee in the 2010 election, ultimately coming third in the Republican primary.

Ron Ramsey announced that he would not seek re-election in 2016, and would instead retire from politics. State Representative Jon Lundberg (R-Bristol) won the primary election on August 4, 2016, to take Ramsey's seat.

== Early years ==
Ramsey graduated from Sullivan Central High School in 1973, and later obtained his bachelor of science degree in 1978, majoring in building construction technology at East Tennessee State University in Johnson City. He is a member of the advisory board of the Farm Credit Association, a former president of the Blountville Business Association, and a former president and current member of the Bristol TN-VA Association of Realtors. He currently works as a real estate broker and an auctioneer.

== State legislature ==
Ramsey represented Senate District 4, which encompasses Johnson and Sullivan Counties in East Tennessee.

He was elected to the General Assembly as a member of the Tennessee House of Representatives in 1992, and served two terms. During his time as a state representative, Ramsey represented the 1st district, composed of Sullivan County. He was elected to the state Senate in 1996 and was re-elected in 2000, 2004, and 2008.

=== 2004 ===
During the 2004 election cycle, Ramsey was one of a few prominent Tennessee General Assembly leadership members who accepted campaign contributions from both the Jack Daniel's PAC and the Wine and Spirits Wholesalers of Tennessee PAC.

=== 2007 ===
In 2007, Ramsey garnered the support all of the GOP senators and one Democratic senator, Rosalind Kurita of Clarksville, in the vote for speakership of the Senate. He won with 18 votes to 15 for Wilder. He is the first Republican to serve as speaker of the Senate in 140 years. Ramsey appointed Kurita as speaker pro tempore in return for her support. Ramsey was re-elected as speaker of the Senate of the 106th General Assembly in 2009 by a vote of 19–14, making him the longest-serving Republican lieutenant governor in Tennessee state history, and the only one since the speaker was granted the additional title of lieutenant governor by state statute.

=== 2008 ===
In 2008, Ramsey endorsed Fred Thompson for President of the United States.

=== 2009 ===
==== SJR0014 Thomas Paine Day in Tennessee ====
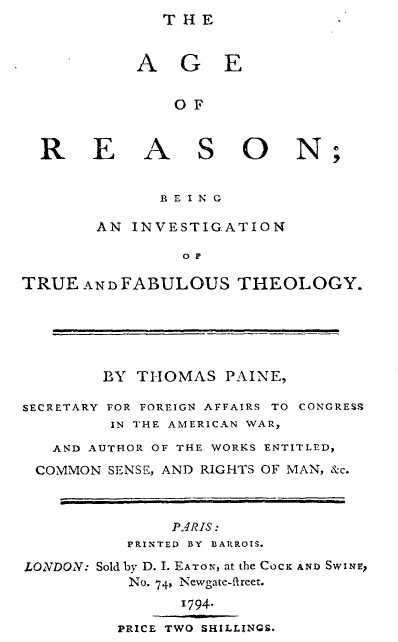
The Age of Reason, Part I. Title page of the first English edition.

Ramsey filed Senate Joint Resolution 14 on January 14, 2009, that if enacted, would have designated January 29 as "Thomas Paine Day" in Tennessee. Among many other notable praises of Paine by Ramsey within his SJR0014, Ramsey cited Paine as the author of the essay Common Sense (1775-17760, a widely circulated pamphlet in the British American colonies advocating independence of people inhabiting the Thirteen Colonies from King George III and Great Britain. Ramsey concluded his SRJ0014 resolution by noting, "Thomas Paine's influence on the American Revolution and his role as a Founding Father of the United States".

Ramsey later dropped his own legislative support of his SJR0014 Thomas Paine Day" resolution by May 6, 2009, after being informed that Paine was also the author of the best-selling book, The Age of Reason; Being an Investigation of True and Fabulous Theology (three editions: 1794, 1795, and 1807) that sparked a deistic revival in the early history of the United States by challenging the concept of institutionalized religion (in particular, Christianity), what Paine saw as evidence of corruption within the Christian Church as evidenced by the efforts of many of its Christian religious leaders to acquire temporal political power, and even the legitimacy of the Bible itself.

=== 2016 ===
On March 16, 2016, Ramsey posted on his Facebook page he would not seek re-election and leave politics altogether, dispelling rumors he was planning to run for governor in 2018.

== 2010 gubernatorial election ==
On February 28, 2009, Ramsey announced that he would run for the Republican nomination for governor of Tennessee.

In July 2010, 20 Tea Party organizations, about half of the roughly 40 Tea Party groups in Tennessee, endorsed Ramsey for governor because of his stances on state sovereignty, health care, immigration, and fiscal issues.

On July 14, 2010, Ramsey said that states would have to deal with attempts to bring Sharia law to the U.S.: "But you cross the line when they start trying to bring Sharia law into the United States. Now, you could even argue whether being a Muslim is actually a religion, or is it a nationality, way of life, cult, whatever you want to call it. Now certainly we do protect our religions, but at the same time this is something we are going to have to face."

On August 5, 2010, Ramsey finished third, receiving 22% votes of the total for the GOP nomination in the state of Tennessee.

== Electoral history ==
Tennessee State Senate District 2 Republican Primary Election, 1996
Party	Candidate	Votes	%
Republican	Ron Ramsey	11,891	62.57
Republican	Wally Boyd	7,113	37.43

Tennessee State Senate District 2 Election, 2000
Party	Candidate	Votes	%
Republican	Ron Ramsey (inc.)	36,105	71.5
Democratic	Vance Carrier	14,394	28.5
Write-ins	Write-ins	3	0.0

Tennessee State Senate District 2 Election, 2004
Party	Candidate	Votes	%
Republican	Ron Ramsey (inc.)	43,560	65.58
Democratic	Wm. "John" McKamey	22,867	34.42

Tennessee State Senate District 2 Election, 2008
Party	Candidate	Votes	%
Republican	Ron Ramsey (inc.)	48,774	72.73
Democratic	Bill Jones	18,292	27.27

Tennessee Governor Republican Primary Election, 2010
Party	Candidate	Votes	%
Republican	Bill Haslam	343,817	47.40
Republican	Zach Wamp	211,735	29.19
Republican	Ron Ramsey	159,555	22.00
Republican	Joe Kirkpatrick	6,787	0.94
Republican	Basil Marceaux, Sr.	3,514	0.48

Tennessee State Senate District 4 Election, 2012
Party	Candidate	Votes	%
Republican	Ron Ramsey (inc.)	55,913	100.00

== Sources ==
- "Lieutenant governor's contest may be a mystery worth decoding". Larry Daughtrey. The Tennessean. May 28, 2006.
- "3) Pharmacists For Life Joins International Boycott" Life Communications. November, 1994.
- "Campaign Finance Reform Bill Fails". Andy Spears. May 3, 2005.
- "John Gregory uses checkbook to promote conservative causes". Hank Haynes. September 3, 2006.
- "Faith Healers: The born-again Gregory brothers worked a financial miracle from cast-off drug brands". Forbes. Zina Moukheiber. October 28, 2002.
- "Campaign gift spat touches the governor". Tennessean. Bonna de la Cruz. October 2, 2004.

Political offices
Preceded by John Wilder	Lieutenant Governor of Tennessee; 2007–2017	Succeeded by Randy McNally
