= Chris Devaney =

American political figure

Chris Devaney served as Chairman of the Tennessee Republican Party from 2009 to 2015.

== Early life ==
Chris Devaney was raised in Cleburne, Texas. He graduated from the University of Oklahoma, where he received a Bachelor of Arts in political science.

== Career ==
He started his career as a journalist for NBC Radio News in Washington, D.C. and later worked in media relations for the Republican Conference of the United States Senate. In 1994, he moved to Tennessee to work on Fred Thompson's campaign for the United States Senate. and later worked for Senator Thompson in Washington, D.C. and Tennessee.

He later served as a senior staff member for Phil Gramm, Senator from Texas. In 2005, Devaney became executive director of the Tennessee Republican Party. and helped Bob Corker's 2006 senatorial campaign. Devaney became state director to Senator Corker shortly after his election.

Devaney was elected chairman of the Tennessee Republican Party in 2009, and was re-elected in 2010, 2012 and 2014. Under his leadership, Republicans in Tennessee gained supermajorities in the Tennessee General Assembly, majorities in the Congressional delegation, and majorities in county and judicial elections statewide.

In 2015, Devaney was appointed as executive director of the Children's Nutrition Program of Haiti, a non-profit that works to prevent and rehabilitate those suffering from childhood malnutrition.

Businessman Bill Lee hired Devaney as campaign manager for his insurgent and successful campaign for governor in Tennessee. He was later asked to join the Lee transition team and was appointed to Governor Bill Lee's cabinet as special assistant to the Governor.

In June 2019, Devaney resigned his position to immediately lead Dr. Manny Sethi's campaign for U.S. Senate in Tennessee.

== Personal life ==
He is married to Heather Devaney, and they live in Lookout Mountain, a suburb of Chattanooga, Tennessee. They have four children, and are members of Lookout Mountain Presbyterian Church.
