= Todd Gardenhire =

American politician (born 1948)

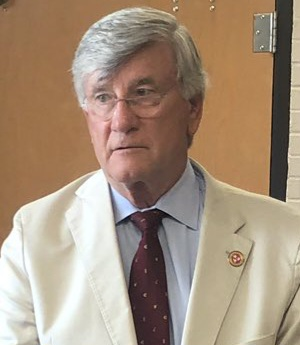
- Gardenhire in 2019

Member of the Tennessee Senate from the 10th district
- Incumbent
- Assumed office January 8, 2013
- Preceded by: Andy Berke

Personal details
- Born: Randall Todd Gardenhire; May 7, 1948 (age 78)
- Party: Republican
- Spouse: Sylvia Gowen
- Children: 4
- Education: University of Tennessee at Chattanooga (BS)
- Website: Senate website

Randall Todd Gardenhire (born May 7, 1948) is an American politician and a Republican member of the Tennessee Senate representing District 10 since January 8, 2013.

Gardenhire became the first Republican to represent District 10 in four decades.

== Education ==
Gardenhire earned his BS in business administration from the University of Tennessee at Chattanooga in 1972.

== Elections ==
- 2012 With District 10 incumbent Democratic Senator Andy Berke running for mayor of Chattanooga and leaving the seat open, Gardenhire ran in the August 2, 2012, Republican Primary, winning by 40 votes with 8,022 votes (50.1%), and won the November 6, 2012, General election with 49,472 votes (69.2%) against Democratic nominee Andraé McGary.
- 2016 won re-election
- 2020 won re-election
- 2024 won re-election

== Personal life ==
Gardenhire is married to Sylvia G. Gardenhire and has four children and five grandchildren. He is a Presbyterian.

Gardenhire was a Senior Vice President of Wealth Management at Morgan Stanley Smith Barney, a Vice President at Merrill Lynch (1976-1987), and a Branch Manager at Pioneer Bank (1972-1976). Gardenhire also served both as a former Presidential Appointee of the Pension Benefit Guaranty during the administration of President George W. Bush and as a former Presidential Appointee of White House Advance Operations during the administration of President Ronald Reagan. His wife Sylvia is retired from IBM.
