= Diana Harshbarger =

American politician (born 1960)

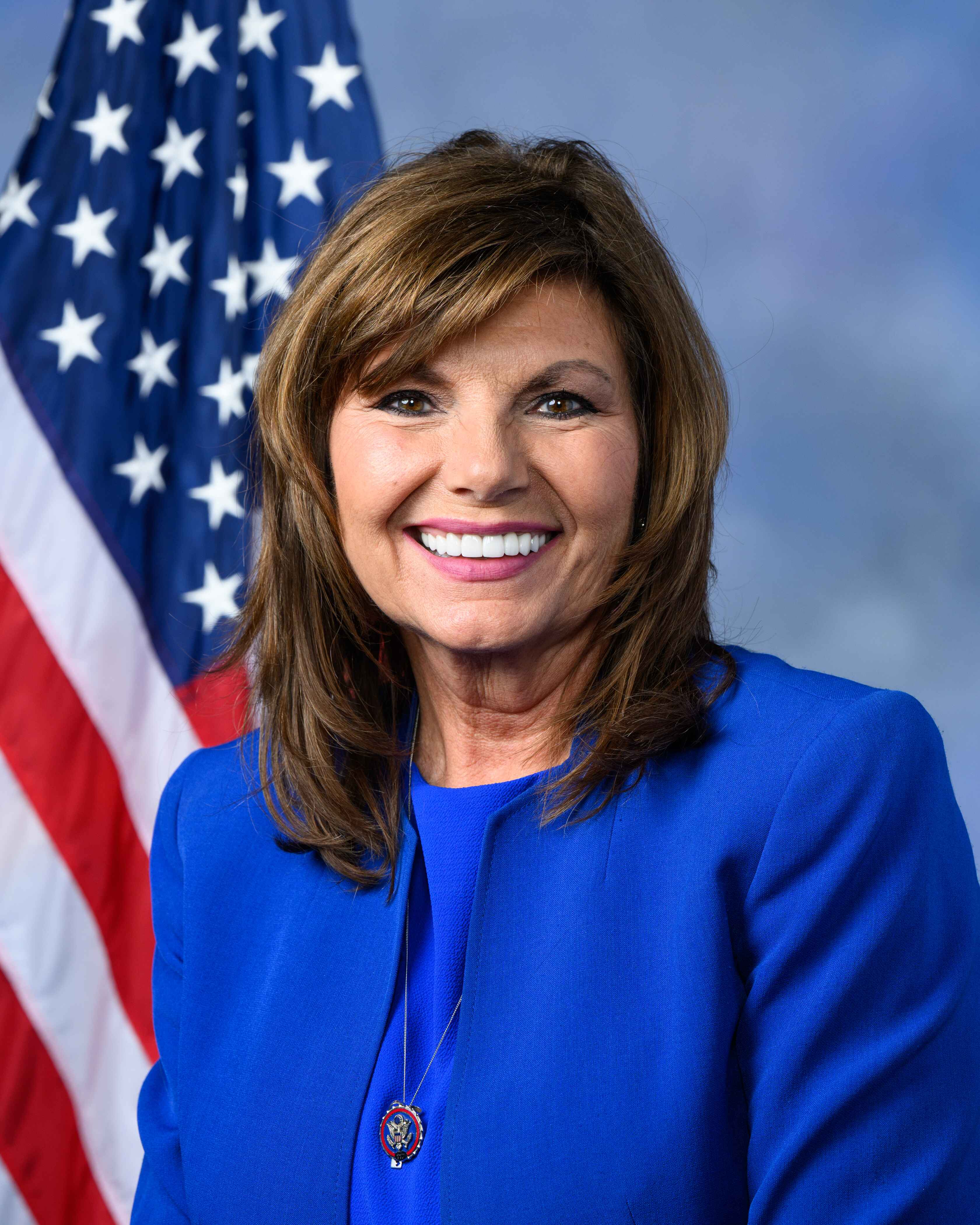
- Official portrait, 2021

Member of the U.S. House of Representatives from Tennessee's 1st district
- Incumbent
- Assumed office January 3, 2021
- Preceded by: Phil Roe

Personal details
- Born: January 1, 1960 (age 66) Kingsport, Tennessee, U.S.
- Party: Republican
- Spouse: Bob Harshbarger
- Children: Bobby
- Education: East Tennessee State University; Mercer University (PharmD)
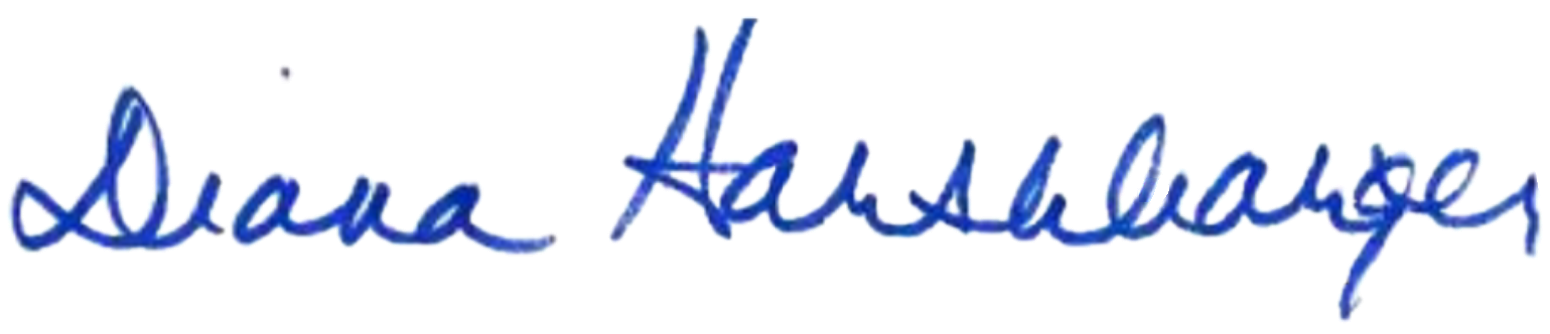
- Signature
- Website: House website Campaign website
- Harshbarger's voice Harshbarger on the importance of the Bible and prayer. Recorded December 1, 2021

Diana Lynn Harshbarger (/ˈhɑːrʃbɑːrɡər/ HARSH-bar-gər; born January 1, 1960) is an American pharmacist, businesswoman, and politician. Harshbarger has served as the U.S. representative for Tennessee's 1st congressional district since 2021. Her district is based in the Tri-Cities area in northeastern Tennessee.

A member of the Republican Party and a strong supporter of President Donald Trump, Harshbarger was first elected to the House of Representatives in 2020, succeeding incumbent representative Phil Roe. She won reelection in 2022 and 2024. A member of the Freedom Caucus and Republican Study Committee, she is the only woman in Tennessee’s house delegation.

Harshbarger was considering a run for Governor of Tennessee in 2026; however, she said she would only run if Senator Marsha Blackburn did not run.

== Early life and career ==
Harshbarger was born in Kingsport, Tennessee, and raised in nearby Bloomingdale. She is the first person in her family to graduate from high school. She attended East Tennessee State University and earned her Doctor of Pharmacy from Mercer University.

Harshbarger has been a licensed pharmacist since 1987. She and her husband, Bob, operate Premier Pharmacy, a compounding pharmacy.

== U.S. House of Representatives ==
=== Election ===
==== 2020 ====
After six-term incumbent and fellow Republican Phil Roe opted to retire from the United States House of Representatives, Harshbarger announced her candidacy to succeed him in the United States House of Representatives for Tennessee's 1st congressional district. She won the 17-way August 5 Republican primary and defeated Democratic nominee Blair Walsingham in the November general election. She had effectively clinched a seat in Congress with her victory in the primary, since the 1st is one of the few ancestrally Republican districts in the South. The 1st has been in Republican hands for all but four years since 1861, and Democrats have garnered as much as 40% of the vote only twice since 1898. The 1st historically gives its incumbents very long tenures in Washington. Harshbarger is only the ninth person (not counting caretakers) to hold the seat since 1911.

When Harshbarger took office on January 3, 2021, she became the fifth woman elected to Congress from Tennessee, but only the third who was not a stand-in for her husband, after Diane Black and Marsha Blackburn.

Harshbarger focused her campaign on fixing the opioid crisis, advocating anti-abortion legislation, and protecting religious freedom. She also highlighted American dependence on Chinese pharmaceutical imports as an issue of national security. During the Republican primary, her opponents criticized her over her alleged involvement with American Inhalation Medication Specialists (AIMS), a business her husband ran that sold mislabeled pharmaceuticals from China. In 2013 Robert Harshbarger pleaded guilty to fraud charges related to the company and was sentenced to 48 months in federal prison, in addition to over $800,000 in restitution and over $400,000 in asset forfeiture. Harshbarger's campaign said she had no involvement with AIMS, despite corporate records to the contrary.

Harshbarger declined to debate her competitors during the primary and general elections.

=== Tenure ===
On January 6, 2021, supporters of President Donald Trump stormed the U.S. Capitol during debate. Lawmakers fled to an undisclosed location for safety. Later that evening, Harshbarger joined 139 other Republican House members in voting to sustain objections to the certification of the results of the 2020 U.S. presidential election, based on claims of voter fraud.

In August 2021, Business Insider reported that Harshbarger had violated the Stop Trading on Congressional Knowledge (STOCK) Act of 2012, a federal transparency and conflict-of-interest law, by failing to properly disclose over 700 stock trades worth between $728,000 and $10.9 million.

Harshbarger supported efforts to impeach President Joe Biden. In September 2021 Harshbarger co-sponsored a resolution by Marjorie Taylor Greene to impeach President Joe Biden over the withdrawal of United States troops from Afghanistan. In May, 2023, she co-sponsored a resolution by Greene to impeach Biden over his handling of security at the United States–Mexico border. Also in May 2023, she co-sponsored Greene's resolutions to impeach Attorney General Merrick Garland, FBI director Christopher Wray, Secretary of Homeland Security Alejandro Mayorkas, and U.S. attorney for D.C. Matthew M. Graves.

Harshbarger was among the 71 Republicans who voted against final passage of the Fiscal Responsibility Act of 2023 in the House.

In 2024, Harshbarger voted against the $60 billion military aid package for Ukraine; The Washington Post reported that some of the funding would have supported defense jobs in her constituency.

On a podcast in 2025, Harshbarger called Representative Al Green a racist term and made a baseless accusation that he hides a gun in his cane. In the same podcast, she also used a slur to refer to members of the LGBTQ community.

In February 2026, Harshbarger prayed to the Christian god that "ungodly" persons should be removed from "places of authority".

== Political positions ==
=== Healthcare ===
In 2024, Harshbarger spoke against expanded coverage of anti-obesity drugs for Medicaid and Medicare recipients. She said, "Obesity is not a disease. It’s a side effect of different things, like unhealthy eating or whatever. So no, I’m not in favor of that, because it’s going to put us in dire straits and run us out of money."

=== Foreign policy ===
In 2025, Harshbarger commented on President Trump's proposal to take over the Gaza Strip and redevelop the area, saying "This is what the leader of the free world looks like" and "Promises made, promises kept".

=== Committee assignments ===
For the 119th Congress:

- Committee on Energy and Commerce
  - Subcommittee on Energy
  - Subcommittee on Health (Vice Chair)
  - Subcommittee on Oversight and Investigations

=== Caucus memberships ===
- GOP Doctors Caucus
- Rural Broadband Caucus
- Tennessee Valley Corridor Caucus
- Republican Study Committee
- Freedom Caucus
- Congressional Western Caucus

== Electoral history ==
=== 2020 ===
United States House of Representatives, Tennessee's 1st District Republican Primary
| Party | Candidate | Votes | % |
|---|---|---|---|
| Republican | Diana Harshbarger | 18,074 | 19.2 |
| Republican | Timothy Hill | 15,731 | 16.7 |
| Republican | Rusty Crowe | 15,179 | 16.1 |
| Republican | Josh Gapp | 13,379 | 14.2 |
| Republican | Steve Darden | 11,647 | 12.4 |
| Republican | John Clark | 8,826 | 9.4 |
| Republican | David Hawk | 4,717 | 5.0 |
| Republican | Nichole Williams | 2,803 | 3.0 |
| Republican | Jay Adkins | 1,635 | 1.7 |
| Republican | Carter Quillen | 853 | 0.9 |
| Republican | Richard Baker | 298 | 0.3 |
| Republican | Chad Fleenor | 282 | 0.3 |
| Republican | Phil Arlinghaus | 274 | 0.3 |
| Republican | Robert Franklin | 229 | 0.2 |
| Republican | Chuck Miller | 189 | 0.2 |
| Republican | Chance Cansler | 147 | 0.2 |

United States House of Representatives, Tennessee's 1st District
| Party | Candidate | Votes | % |
|---|---|---|---|
| Republican | Diana Harshbarger | 228,181 | 74.7 |
| Democratic | Blair Walsingham | 68,617 | 22.5 |
| Independent | Steve Holder | 8,261 | 2.8 |
| Independent | Josh Berger (write-in) | 4 | 0.0 |
| Independent | David Adams (write-in) | 2 | 0.0 |

=== 2022 ===
Republican primary results
| Party | Candidate | Votes | % |
|---|---|---|---|
| Republican | Diana Harshbarger (incumbent) | 43,761 | 100.0 |
| Total votes | | 43,761 | 100.0 |

2022 Tennessee's 1st Congressional District General Election
| Party | Candidate | Votes | % |
|---|---|---|---|
| Republican | Diana Harshbarger (incumbent) | 147,241 | 78.32% |
| Democratic | Cameron Parsons | 37,049 | 19.71% |
| Independent | Richard Baker | 2,466 | 1.31% |
| Independent | Ahmed Makrom | 1,247 | 0.66% |
| Total votes | | 188,003 | 100.0% |
| Republican hold | | | |

=== 2024 ===
2024 Tennessee's 1st Congressional District General Election
| Party | Candidate | Votes | % |
|---|---|---|---|
| Republican | Diana Harshbarger (incumbent) | 257,825 | 78.08% |
| Democratic | Kevin Jenkins | 64,021 | 19.39% |
| Independent | Richard Baker | 5,714 | 1.73% |
| Independent | Levi Brake | 2,639 | 0.80% |
| Total votes | | 330,199 | 100.00% |
| Republican hold | | | |

== Personal life ==
Harshbarger is a Baptist. Her husband pleaded guilty to federal charges of distributing misbranded drugs from China to kidney-dialysis patients; he was sentenced to 4 years in prison and ordered to pay restitution of $848,504 and a $25,000 criminal fine, in addition to forfeiting $425,000 in cash. Her only son, Bobby Harshbarger, is currently the Republican state Senator for Tennessee's 4th Senate district.

On July 30, 2024, her husband was issued a summons by the Sullivan County judicial commissioner after he was found trying to remove campaign signs from state Senator Jon Lundberg, their son's primary opponent. On August 29, all charges against him were dismissed.

== See also ==
- Women in the United States House of Representatives

U.S. House of Representatives
| Preceded by Phil Roe | Member of the U.S. House of Representatives from Tennessee's 1st congressional district 2021–present | Incumbent |
U.S. order of precedence (ceremonial)
| Preceded by Carlos A. Giménez | United States representatives by seniority 254th | Succeeded by Ashley Hinson |
