= Bobby Harshbarger =

American politician (born 1985)

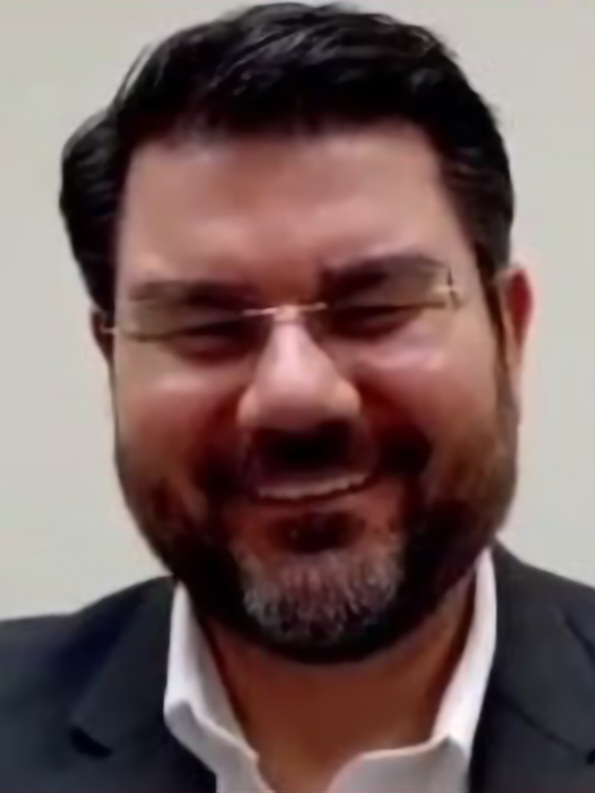
- Harshbarger in 2024

Member of the Tennessee Senate from the 4th district
- Incumbent
- Assumed office January 14, 2025
- Preceded by: Jon Lundberg

Personal details
- Born: Robert Harshbarger III; January 31, 1985 (age 41)
- Party: Republican
- Spouse: Erin Harshbarger
- Children: 2
- Relatives: Diana Harshbarger (mother)
- Education: East Tennessee State University (BS); Mercer University (PharmD)
- Website: Senate website Campaign website

Robert "Bobby" Harshbarger III (born January 31, 1985) is a Tennessee politician and pharmacist. A member of the Republican party, he was elected to Tennessee's 4th Senate district in 2024 after defeating Independent candidate Dalia Price.

== Tennessee Senate ==
On August 1, 2024, Harshbarger defeated incumbent State Senator Jon Lundberg 52-48% in the fourth district. He went on to win the general election in November by nearly 54 points.

== Personal life ==
Harshbarger was born on January 31, 1985. His mother is U.S. Representative Diana Harshbarger of Tennessee's 1st congressional district. Harshbarger completed his Bachelor of Science degree at East Tennessee State University and his Doctor of Pharmacy at Mercer University College of Pharmacy and Health Sciences.
