= Mercer University Health Sciences Center =

Private college in Georgia, US

- Type: Private
- Established: 2012
- Dean: Dr. Hewitt W. (Ted) Matthews
- Administrative staff: 400
- Students: 1700
- Location: Macon, Atlanta, Savannah, Columbus, Georgia, USA; 32°49′44″N 83°38′57″W
- Website: www.mercer.edu

The Mercer University Health Sciences Center opened on July 1, 2012. The Health Sciences Center has campuses in Macon, Atlanta, Savannah and Columbus in the U.S. state of Georgia.

The Mercer University board of trustees established the Health Sciences Center on April 20, 2012. The center provides centralized administration and unity of purpose for the university's programs in medicine, pharmacy, nursing, and health professions.

The Health Sciences Center enrolls more than 1,700 students, employs more than 400 full-time faculty and staff, and graduates more than 500 physicians, nurses and nurse educators, physician assistants, pharmacists, physical therapists, family therapists, public health professionals, and biomedical scientists each year.

Dr. Hewitt W. (Ted) Matthews, Dean of the College of Pharmacy, leads the Health Sciences Center as the university's Senior Vice President for Health Sciences.

== Academic Units ==
=== School of Medicine ===
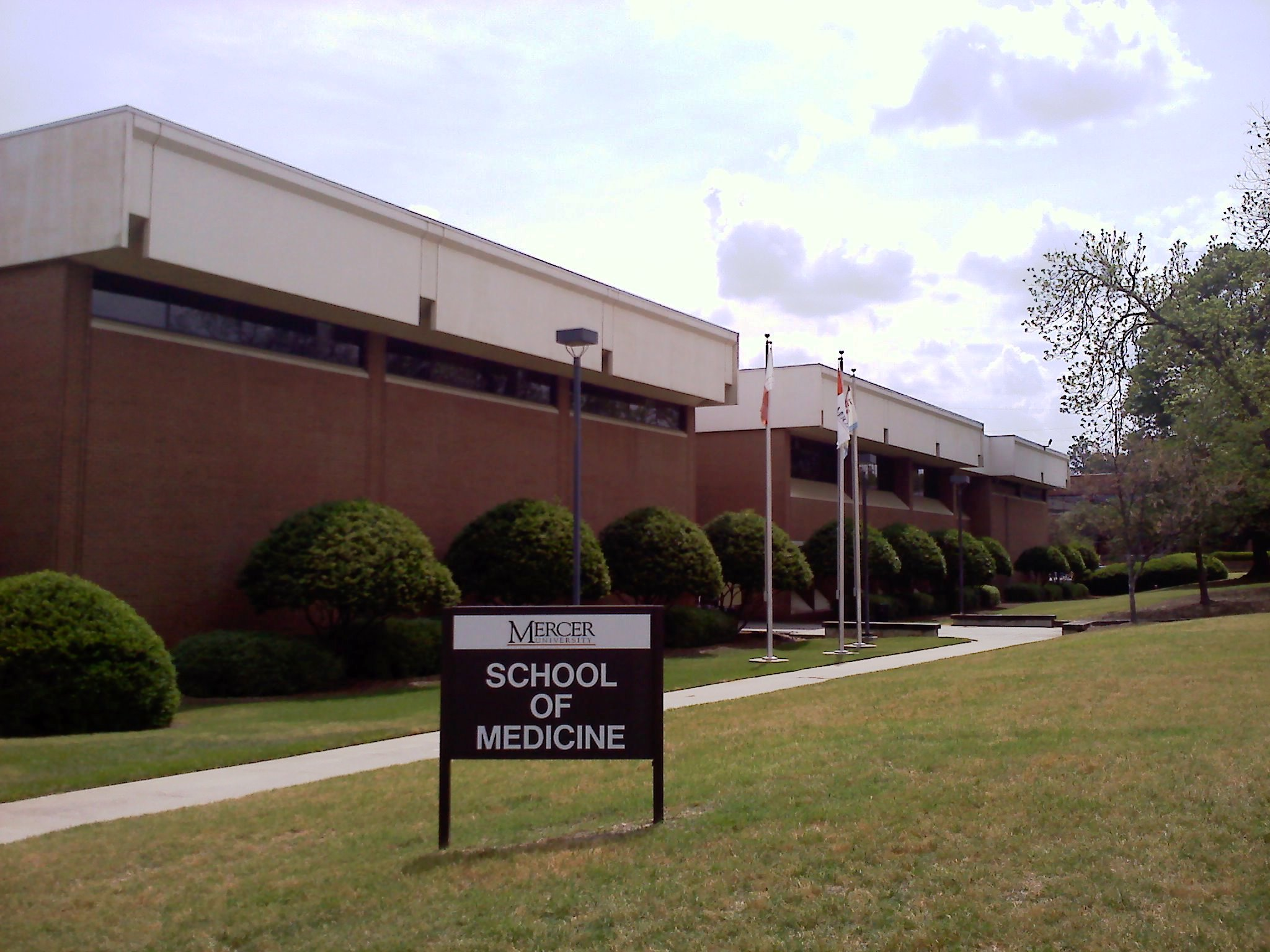
Medical Education Building - Macon

The School of Medicine, founded in 1982, is partially state funded and accepts only Georgia residents into the Doctor of Medicine program. The school's core mission is to train primary care physicians and other health professionals for service in rural and medically underserved areas of Georgia. In addition to the Doctor of Medicine, the school offers master's programs in family therapy and nurse anesthetist.

The School of Medicine has two four-year campuses; the original campus in Macon and a second campus in Savannah. Mercer opened the Savannah campus in 2008, the first medical school in southern Georgia, when the university received additional state funding to expand its existing partnership with Memorial University Medical Center. Third and fourth year Mercer students have completed clinical rotations at Memorial since 1996. The Macon and Savannah campuses are administered by Senior Associate Deans who report to one Dean.

The School of Medicine's four teaching hospitals are the Medical Center of Central Georgia in Macon, Memorial University Medical Center in Savannah, Columbus Regional Medical Center in Columbus, and St. Francis Hospital in Columbus. The Columbus campus offers clinical rotations for third- and fourth-year students.

The School of Medicine also has a clinical component—Mercer Medicine—through which faculty physicians of Internal and Family Medicine provide medical care to patients, while supporting a clinical learning environment for medical students.

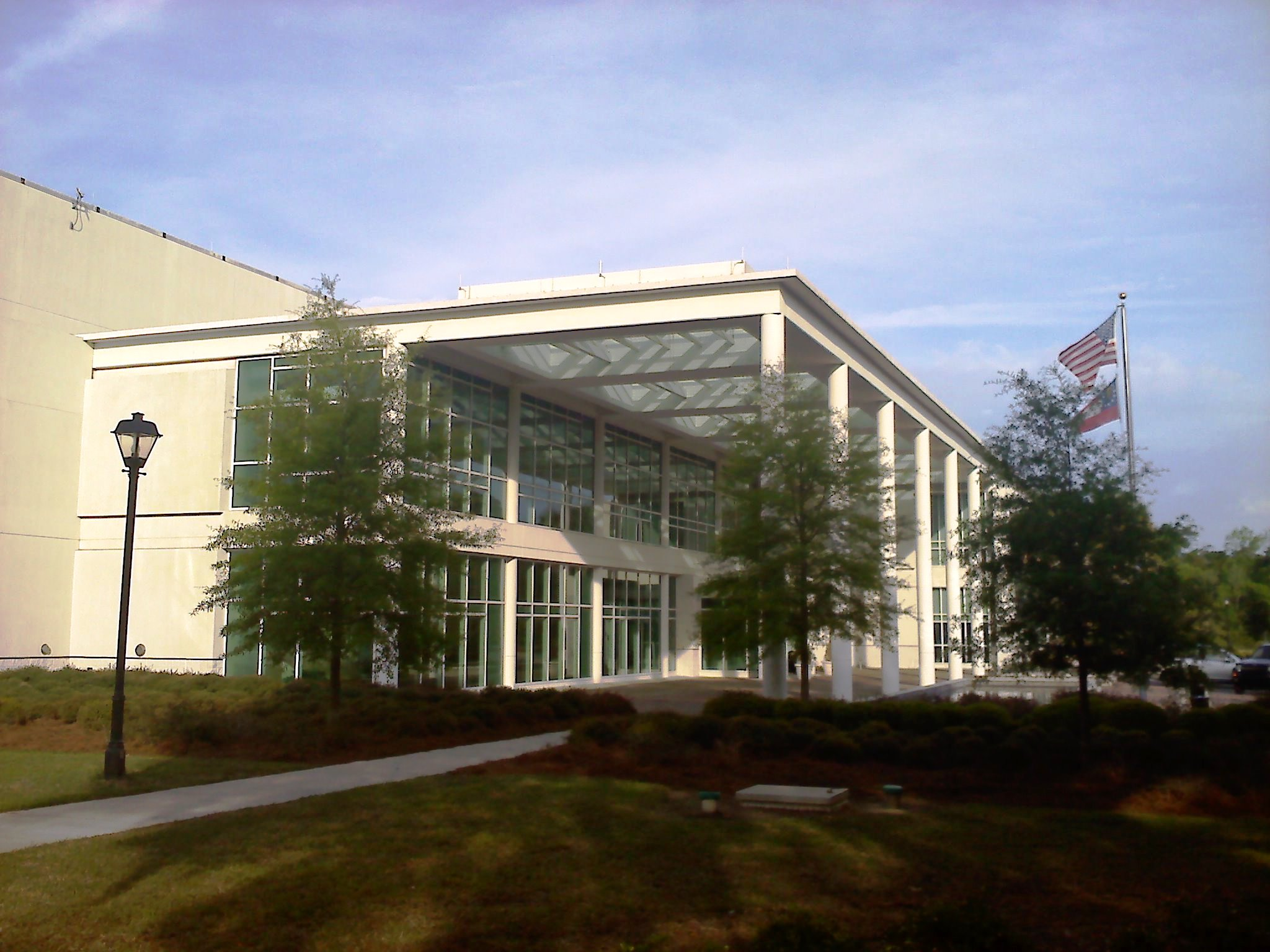
Medical Education Building - Savannah

In April 2011, Mercer announced a new Doctor of Clinical Medical Psychology program with the first students to enroll in the fall of 2012.

=== College of Pharmacy ===
The College of Pharmacy, founded in 1903, was an independent school in Atlanta until it merged with Mercer in 1959. The college, ranked by U.S. News & World Report among the top five private pharmacy schools in the country, moved from its downtown location to Mercer's Atlanta campus in 1992. In 1972, the then Southern School of Pharmacy offered the Doctor of Pharmacy as an advanced clinical degree in Pharmacy requiring 2 additional years. The first Doctor of Pharmacy students graduated in 1973. In 1981, the college became the first in the southeast and the fifth in the nation to offer the Doctor of Pharmacy, the highest level of pharmacy education, as its sole professional degree.

The college was named the Southern School of Pharmacy until 2006 when it was renamed the College of Pharmacy and Health Sciences; the name change reflected new physician assistant and physical therapy programs. The college received its current name in 2013 when the physician assistant and physical therapy programs were shifted to the new College of Health Professions.

In July 2013, Mercer announced plans for a new College of Pharmacy building on the Atlanta campus; construction will begin in 2014 with completion in 2015.

=== Georgia Baptist College of Nursing ===
The Georgia Baptist College of Nursing was founded in 1901 as the Baptist Tabernacle Infirmary, an independent institution in Atlanta. The college was renamed the Baptist Tabernacle Infirmary and Training School for Nurses when nursing education began in 1902. The college, named the Georgia Baptist College of Nursing in 1993, merged with Mercer in 2001 and moved from its downtown location to Mercer's Atlanta campus in 2002. The college offers undergraduate and graduate programs and provides clinical experiences at numerous Atlanta-area hospitals and at other community facilities.

The college began offering the Doctor of Philosophy in Nursing degree in August 2009 and the Doctor of Nursing Practice degree in August 2010.

Beginning in August 2013, the college will offer the Bachelor of Science in Nursing degree on the Macon campus; the degree program will continue on the Atlanta campus allowing students to attend either location.

=== College of Health Professions ===
The College of Health Professions opened on July 1, 2013. Mercer's twelfth academic unit offers the Doctor of Physical Therapy degree along with master's-level physician assistant and public health programs previously offered by the College of Pharmacy and the School of Medicine. The new college allows for the addition of future health sciences programs, such as occupational therapy, as well as expansion of existing programs on multiple Mercer campuses.

The physical therapy department and the Shepherd Center in Atlanta offer a 13-month post-professional residency that provides accelerated training for physical therapists. The Shepherd Center is one of the nation's best rehabilitation hospitals; the residency program is one of only 14 in the nation.

== Educational Partnerships ==
=== Piedmont Healthcare ===
The Center for Health and Learning is an educational partnership between the School of Medicine, the Georgia Baptist College of Nursing, and Piedmont Healthcare of Atlanta. Piedmont is a not-for-profit organization with several hospitals, including Piedmont Hospital and Piedmont Fayette Hospital, both recognized as among the best in the nation, a primary care physician group with approximately 20 clinics, and a physician network with approximately 500 members. Family therapy and nursing students are provided learning experiences at various facilities throughout the Piedmont system.
