= Tennessee's 10th Senate district =

American legislative district

Tennessee's 10th State Senate district
Senator
Todd Gardenhire; R–Chattanooga
- Demographics: 71% White; 15% Black; 8% Hispanic; 2% Asian; 2% Multiracial
- Population (2022): 212,858

Tennessee's 10th Senate district is one of 33 districts in the Tennessee Senate. It has been represented by Republican Todd Gardenhire since 2012, succeeding Democrat Andy Berke.

== List of representatives ==
- Todd Gardenhire, 2013-present
- Andy Berke, 2007-2013
- Ward Crutchfield, 1985-2007
- Bill Ortwein, 1977-1985

== Geography ==
District 10 is based in part of Hamilton County and part of Chattanooga, covering most of the city proper. The district includes the counties of Bledsoe, Marion, Sequatchie Counties.

The district is located largely within Tennessee's 4th congressional district, with the Chattanooga portion in the 3rd district. It borders the state of Georgia.

== Recent election results ==
Tennessee Senators are elected to staggered four-year terms, with odd-numbered districts holding elections in midterm years and even-numbered districts holding elections in presidential years.

=== Results under lines (2022-2032) ===
2024 Tennessee Senate election, District 10
Party	Candidate	Votes	%
Republican	Todd Gardenhire (incumbent)	54,521	61.22%
Democratic	Missy Crutchfield	34,536	38.78%
Total votes		89,057	100.00%

=== 2020 ===
2020 Tennessee Senate election, District 10
Party	Candidate	Votes	%
Republican	Todd Gardenhire (incumbent)	45,049	53.2
Democratic	Glenn Scruggs	39,688	46.8
Total votes		84,737	100
Republican hold			

=== 2016 ===
2016 Tennessee Senate election, District 10
Primary election
Party	Candidate	Votes	%
Democratic	Khristy Wilkinson	2,662	43.6
Democratic	Nick Wilkinson	2,111	34.6
Democratic	Ty O'Grady	1,335	21.9
Total votes		6,108	100
General election
Republican	Todd Gardenhire (incumbent)	39,308	55.9
Democratic	Khristy Wilkinson	31,043	44.1
Total votes		70,351	100
Republican hold			

=== 2012 ===
2012 Tennessee Senate election, District 10
Primary election
Party	Candidate	Votes	%
Democratic	Andrae McGary	4,302	61.6
Democratic	David Testerman	1,705	24.4
Democratic	Quenston Coleman	979	14.0
Total votes		6,986	100
Republican	Todd Gardenhire	8,022	50.1
Republican	Greg Vital	7,982	49.9
Total votes		16,004	100
General election
Republican	Todd Gardenhire	36,557	54.3
Democratic	Andrae McGary	30,745	45.7
Total votes		67,302	100
Republican gain from Democratic			

Gardenhire became the first Republican to represent District 10 in four decades.

=== Federal and statewide results (2012-2022 lines) ===
Year	Office	Results
2020	President	Trump 50.6 – 47.2%
2016	President	Trump 52.1 – 43.0%
2012	President	Romney 52.3 – 46.0%
2012	Senate	Corker 61.9 – 34.6%
