= Ward Crutchfield =

American politician (1928–2016)

Member of the Tennessee Senate from the 10th district
- In office January 8, 1985 – July 27, 2007
- Preceded by: Bill Ortwein
- Succeeded by: Andy Berke
- In office January 7, 1963 – January 3, 1967

Member of the Tennessee House of Representatives from Hamilton County
- In office January 2, 1961 – January 7, 1963
- Preceded by: Z. Cartter Patten Jr.
- Succeeded by: Arvin H. Reingold
- In office January 7, 1957 – January 5, 1959
- Preceded by: J. Fred Johnson Jr.
- Succeeded by: Z. Cartter Patten Jr.

Personal details
- Born: William Ward Crutchfield; December 6, 1928 Chattanooga, Tennessee
- Died: April 3, 2016 (aged 87) Chattanooga, Tennessee
- Party: Democratic
- Spouse: Joan Nunley (m. 1966)
- Education: University of Chattanooga; University of Tennessee College of Law
- Occupation: Lawyer; politician

Military service
- Allegiance: United States
- Branch/service: United States Army
- Years of service: 1953–1954

William Ward Crutchfield (December 6, 1928 – April 3, 2016) was an American politician and a Democratic member of the Tennessee Senate for the 10th district, which encompassed Marion County and part of Hamilton County. He was a member of the Tennessee House of Representatives from 1957 to 1959 and 1961 to 1963. He served as a state senator from 1963 to 1967 as well as in all General Assemblies from 1987 to 2007.

Crutchfield was a member of the Senate Finance, Ways and Means Committee; Senate Commerce, Labor, and Agriculture; and the Senate Education Committee. He was Chairman of the Senate Labor Committee during the 83rd and 84th General Assemblies. He served as the Democratic leader during the 101st through 103rd General Assemblies, and he was a Senate Democratic Caucus chairman.

He attended the University of Chattanooga (now the University of Tennessee at Chattanooga) and received a J.D. from the University of Tennessee College of Law in Knoxville in 1951. He received an honorable discharge from the U.S. Army. He is a former member of the Metropolitan Government Charter Commission. He worked as an attorney, having once been an acting attorney for Hamilton County and an attorney for the Hamilton County Board of Education.

== Operation Tennessee Waltz ==
On May 26, 2005, Crutchfield was arrested as part of the Operation Tennessee Waltz bribery scandal. He was accused of taking US$12,000 from a front company of the Federal Bureau of Investigation in USA vs. Ward Crutchfield and Charles Love. On July 12, 2007, Crutchfield pleaded guilty to one count of bribery. He resigned from the State Senate on July 27, 2007, and was succeeded by fellow Democrat Andy Berke. On January 17, 2008, he was sentenced to six months' home confinement, two years' probation, and a US$3,000 fine. He died at the age of 87 in 2016.
