= Jon Lundberg =

American politician (born 1961)

Member of the Tennessee Senate from the 4th district
- In office January 9, 2017 – January 14, 2025
- Preceded by: Ron Ramsey
- Succeeded by: Bobby Harshbarger

Member of the Tennessee House of Representatives from the 1st district
- In office January 9, 2007 – January 2017
- Preceded by: Steve Godsey
- Succeeded by: John Crawford

Personal details
- Born: June 26, 1961 (age 65) Royal Oak, Michigan, U.S.
- Party: Republican
- Spouse: Lisa Lundberg
- Children: Samantha; Nelson
- Occupation: Public Relations
- Website: State Page

Jon C. Lundberg (born June 26, 1961) is an American politician who served as a Republican member of the Tennessee State Senate for the 4th district. He was first elected to the 105th Tennessee General Assembly (2007–2008). He served as deputy speaker of the Senate and first vice chairman of the Education Committee, a member of the Finance and Judiciary Committee. In the House, he was chairman of the Civil Justice Committee, the Commerce Subcommittee, a member of the Civil Justice Subcommittee, a member of the Insurance and Banking Committee, and a member of the Calendar and Rules Committee. He also served in leadership as the Republican floor leader.

Following the statement from then Lt. Governor Ron Ramsey that he would not seek reelection, Lundberg announced his bid for the Lt. Governor's Senate seat on March 18, 2016. Lundberg won a four-way primary by more than 55% on August 4, 2016, and went on to win the general election November 8, 2016.

In 2020, Lundberg won re-election to the 4th Senate district in the general election by nearly 80%. Lunderberg lost his primary election by four points in 2024.

== Education and career ==
Lundberg graduated from the University of Southern Colorado (now known as Colorado State University Pueblo) with a bachelor's degree in communications. He attended graduate school at Wichita State University. He is a retired captain in the United States Navy Reserve, and he served on the board of Highlands Bankshares and Highlands Union Bank and the Tennessee Supreme Court Board of Professional Responsibility. His community service includes membership in the Bristol, Kingsport, and Johnson City Chambers of Commerce, prior service on the board of the Bristol Chamber of Commerce, Bristol Rotary Club, Thomas Green Lecture Series, King College President's Roundtable, past president of the Tri-Cities Chapter of the Public Relations Society of America, and vice president of the Rocky Mount Living History Museum. Jon Lundberg works in public relations.

He is president of Corporate Image Inc., a public-relations firm headquartered in East Tennessee and chief executive officer of Corporate Marketing, an advertising agency also headquartered in East Tennessee. In 2010, his company purchased Griffin Specialty Products and rebranded it to become Corporate Specialty Group, where he served as president. Corporate Specialty was sold in 2012. Prior to this, he was a broadcast journalist, being a lead anchor or managing editor for TV and radio stations in Colorado Springs, Vail, and Aspen, Colorado, in addition to Reno, Nevada, Wichita, Kansas, Bristol, Virginia, and Bristol, Tennessee.

On May 21, 2020, State Senator Rusty Crowe announced that Lundberg would be the co-chair of his campaign for election to the U.S. House of Representatives for the 1st District of Tennessee.

== Electoral history ==
=== 2006 ===
Tennessee House of Representatives - District 1 Republican Primary
Party	Candidate	Votes	%
Republican	Jon Lundberg	1,793	50.3
Republican	John Crawford	1,771	49.7

Tennessee House of Representatives - District 1
Party	Candidate	Votes	%
Republican	Jon Lundberg	8,720	61.2
Democratic	Kevin B. Smith	5,087	35.7
Independent	Jerry G. Dykes	294	0.02
Independent	John Robert Harrison	145	0.01

=== 2008 ===
Tennessee House of Representatives - District 1
Party	Candidate	Votes	%
Republican	Jon Lundberg (Incumbent)	12,986	65.6
Democratic	Michael Blain Surgenor	6,803	34.4

=== 2010 ===
Jon Lundberg ran unopposed in the 2010 general election.

=== 2012 ===
Jon Lundberg ran unopposed in the 2012 general election.

=== 2014 ===
Tennessee House of Representatives - District 1
Party	Candidate	Votes	%
Republican	Jon Lundberg (incumbent)	9,460	100
Independent	Harold Tucker (write-in)	1	0

=== 2016 ===
Jon Lundberg launched his campaign to succeed Lt. Governor Ron Ramsey, who was vacating the district 4 seat; he defeated former state representative Tony Shipley and perennial candidate Neal Kerney.

Tennessee State Senate - District 4 Republican Primary
Party	Candidate	Votes	%
Republican	Jon Lundberg	7,019	55.21
Republican	Tony Shipley	2,684	21.11
Republican	Neal Kerney	2,629	20.68
Republican	John Paul Blevins	381	3.00

Jon Lundberg ran unopposed in the 2016 general election.

=== 2020 ===
Jon Lundberg ran unopposed in the Republican primary election. In the general election, he defeated first-time candidate and Kingsport native Amber Riddle.

Tennessee State Senate - District 4
Party	Candidate	Votes	%
Republican	Jon Lundberg (incumbent)	65,638	79.1
Democratic	Amber Riddle	17,381	20.9
