= Randy McNally =

American politician (born 1944)

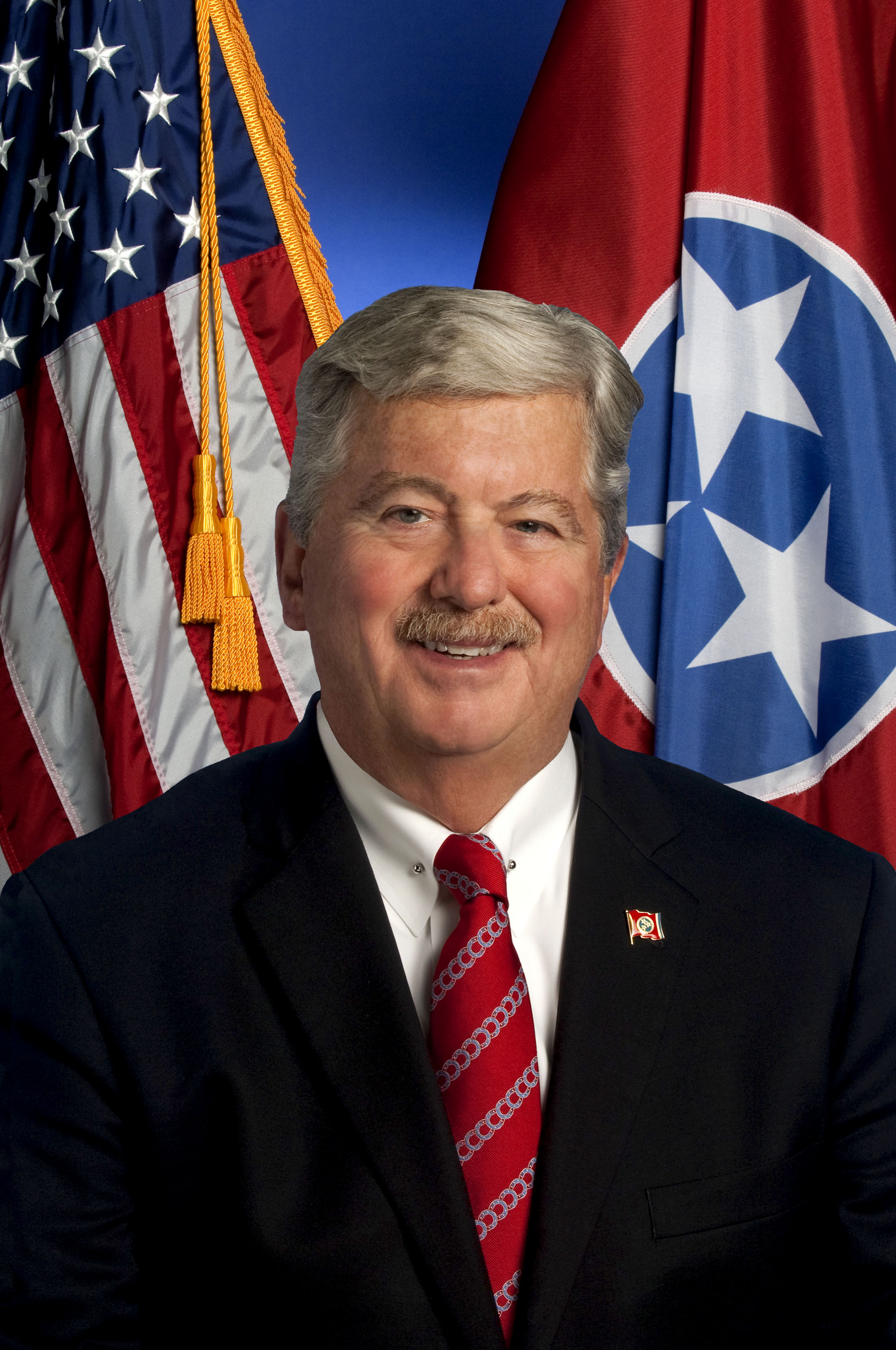
- Official portrait, 2011

50th Lieutenant Governor of Tennessee Speaker of the Tennessee Senate
- Incumbent
- Assumed office January 10, 2017
- Governor: Bill Haslam; Bill Lee
- Preceded by: Ron Ramsey

Member of the Tennessee Senate from the 5th district
- Incumbent
- Assumed office January 13, 1987
- Preceded by: Buzz Elkins

Member of the Tennessee House of Representatives from the 33rd district
- In office January 9, 1979 – January 13, 1987
- Preceded by: A. Keith Bissell
- Succeeded by: David Coffey

Personal details
- Born: James Rand McNally III; January 30, 1944 (age 82) Boston, Massachusetts, U.S.
- Party: Republican
- Spouse: Janice McNally
- Children: 2
- Education: University of Memphis (BS); University of Tennessee, Memphis (MPharm)
- Website: Government website

James Rand McNally III (born January 30, 1944) is an American politician. He is the 50th lieutenant governor of Tennessee. A member of the Republican Party, he has been the state senator from the 5th district since 1987.

On February 26, 2026, McNally announced his pending retirement from the Tennessee State Senate at the conclusion of his term in January 2027, citing health concerns. McNally has represented District 5 in the Tennessee Senate for 10 terms, having first been elected in 1986. His retirement ends a legislative career spanning 40 years.

== Early life and education ==
McNally was born in Boston, Massachusetts and later graduated from Oak Ridge High School, Tennessee in 1962, obtained a Bachelor of Science (BS) from Memphis State University in 1967, and graduated from University of Tennessee College of Pharmacy in 1969.

== Career ==
Beginning in the late 1960s, he worked as a pharmacist in chain drug stores. In 1978, he began employment as a hospital pharmacist at Methodist Medical Center in Oak Ridge, Tennessee. McNally has served in the Tennessee General Assembly since 1979. He was elected to the 91st through 94th General Assemblies as a member of the Tennessee House of Representatives. He was a key figure in the Operation Rocky Top investigation in the late 1980s, when he worked undercover to help the Federal Bureau of Investigation and Tennessee Bureau of Investigation obtain evidence on political corruption in the Tennessee state government.

He moved to the State Senate for the 95th General Assembly in 1987 and has served there continuously since then. McNally was a candidate for lieutenant governor and Speaker of the Senate in 2007, but fellow Republican Ron Ramsey was elected. On January 10, 2017, he was elected lieutenant governor and Senate Speaker by the state senate.

== Personal life ==
McNally is Roman Catholic. He and his wife, Janice, have two daughters.

In February 2023, McNally underwent emergency heart surgery after having symptoms of an irregular heartbeat. Doctors at Vanderbilt University Medical Center installed a pacemaker for McNally. He returned to the Tennessee Senate one week later.

=== Instagram controversy ===
In March 2023, it was reported McNally had used his verified Instagram account to 'like' and comment on sexually suggestive social media posts on the Instagram account of a 20-year-old gay man. Various LGBT groups criticized McNally and accused him of hypocrisy, due to his support for socially conservative laws, including the Tennessee Adult Entertainment Act. A spokesman for McNally stated he "enjoys interacting with constituents and Tennesseans of all religions, backgrounds and orientations on social media" and "has no intention of stopping".

About a week later, state Rep. Todd Warner released a statement calling on McNally to step down and accusing him of being a predator. A meeting of the Senate GOP caucus voted to retain McNally as speaker.

Political offices
Preceded by Ron Ramsey	Lieutenant Governor of Tennessee; 2017–present	Incumbent
