= Tennessee's 4th Senate district =

American legislative district

Tennessee's 4th State Senate district
Senator
Bobby Harshbarger; R–Kingsport
- Demographics: 93% White; 2% Black; 2% Hispanic; 1% Asian; 2% Multiracial
- Population (2022): 215,829

Tennessee's 4th Senate district is one of 33 districts in the Tennessee Senate. It has been represented by Republican Bobby Harshbarger since 2024, succeeding fellow Republican Jon Lundberg.

== Geography ==
District 4 is based in Kingsport and Bristol, the northern two cities in the Tri-Cities area, also including the nearby communities of Bloomingdale, Colonial Heights, Blountville, and Church Hill. The district, located in the far northeastern tip of the state, covers all of Hawkins and Sullivan County.

The district is located entirely within Tennessee's 1st congressional district, and overlaps with the 1st, 2nd, 3rd, and 4th districts of the Tennessee House of Representatives. It borders the state of Virginia.

== Recent election results ==
Tennessee Senators are elected to staggered four-year terms, with odd-numbered districts holding elections in midterm years and even-numbered districts holding elections in presidential years.

=== 2024 ===
2024 Tennessee Senate election, District 4
Primary election
Party	Candidate	Votes	%
Republican	Bobby Harshbarger	11,545	52.0
Republican	Jon Lundberg (incumbent)	10,668	48.0
Total votes		22,213	100
General election
Republican	Bobby Harshbarger	72,900	76.8
Independent	Dalia Price	22,059	23.2
Total votes		94,959	100
Republican hold			

=== 2020 ===
2020 Tennessee Senate election, District 4
Party	Candidate	Votes	%
Republican	Jon Lundberg (incumbent)	65,638	79.1
Democratic	Amber Riddle	17,381	20.9
Total votes		83,019	100
Republican hold			

=== 2016 ===
2016 Tennessee Senate election, District 4
Primary election
Party	Candidate	Votes	%
Republican	Jon Lundberg	7,019	55.2
Republican	Tony Shipley	2,684	21.1
Republican	Neal Kerney	2,629	20.7
Republican	John Paul Blevins	381	3.0
Total votes		12,713	100
General election
Republican	Jon Lundberg	60,516	100
Total votes		60,516	100
Republican hold			

=== 2012 ===
2012 Tennessee Senate election, District 4
Party	Candidate	Votes	%
Republican	Ron Ramsey (incumbent)	55,913	100
Total votes		55,913	100
Republican hold			

=== Federal and statewide results ===
Year	Office	Results
2020	President	Trump 76.3 – 22%
2016	President	Trump 76.8 – 19.4%
2012	President	Romney 73.2 – 25.2%
2012	Senate	Corker 76.1 – 19.9%

== List of members representing the district ==
Name	Party	Years	Electoral history
Ben W. Hooper	Republican	1981-1985	Elected in 1980. Retired.
J.B. Wallace	Republican	1985-1989	Elected in 1984. Retired.
Lynn Lawson	Republican	1989-1993	Elected in 1988. Retired.
Danny Wallace	Democratic	1993-1997	Elected in 1992. Lost Re-Election.
Michael Williams	Republican	1996- March 2007	Elected in 1996. Re-Elected in 2000. Re-Elected in 2004. Lost Re-Election.
Michael Williams	Independent	March 2007 - 2009	Elected in 1996. Re-Elected in 2000. Re-Elected in 2004. Lost Re-Election.
Mike Faulk	Republican	2009-2013	Elected in 2008. Retired.
Ron Ramsey	Republican	2013-2017	Redistricted from the 2nd District; Elected in 2012. Retired.
Jon Lundberg	Republican	2017–2025	Elected in 2016. Re-Elected in 2020. Lost Re-Election.
Bobby Harshbarger	Republican	2025–Present	Elected in 2024.
