= Bill Powers (American politician) =

American politician (born 1957)

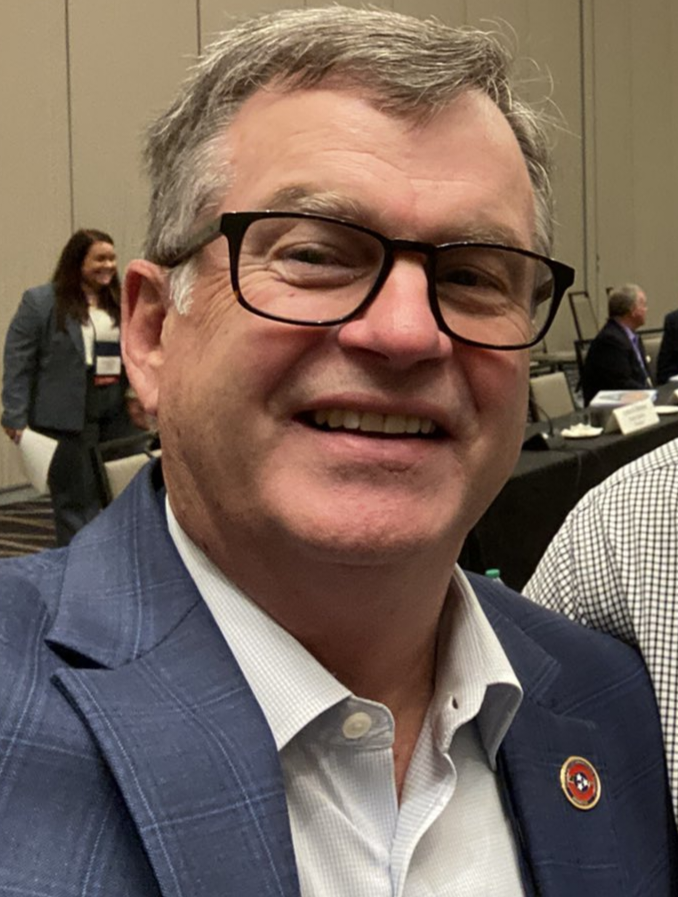
- Powers in 2021

Member of the Tennessee Senate from the 22nd district
- Incumbent
- Assumed office April 25, 2019
- Preceded by: Rosalind Kurita

Personal details
- Born: March 10, 1957 (age 68) Clarksville, Tennessee, U.S.
- Party: Republican
- Spouse: Fran Powers
- Children: 3
- Education: University of Tennessee, Knoxville (BA)
- Website: Campaign website

Bill Powers (born March 10, 1957) is a Republican member of the Tennessee Senate since being elected in April 2019. He represents the 22nd Senate district which includes most of Montgomery County.

== Early life, family, and education ==
He was born in Clarksville, Tennessee and continues to live there to this day. He is the husband of Fran Powers, and they are parents of three children: Spence, Louise, and Henry. He graduated with honors from the University of Tennessee with a Bachelor of Arts, English/History.

== Political career ==
=== Local politics ===
He was elected two terms on the Clarksville City Council. Throughout his two terms, Powers served as Chairman of Clarksville Gas & Water; Clarksville Department of Electricity/ Lightband Board of Directors; Parks & Recreation; and Board of Zoning Appeals for the city.

=== State politics ===
Powers began his campaign for the Tennessee Senate on January 11, 2019, due to Tennessee Senator Mark Green stepping down from his position, causing a vacancy. On March 7, Powers won the Republican primary with 39.1% of the vote. On April 23, Powers won the general election with 53.6% of the vote, defeating Democrat Juanita Charles and Independent candidates Doyle Clark and David Cutting. Powers was sworn in on April 25, on the same day he voted in favor of governor Bill Lee's education savings account legislation.

On February 14, 2020, Powers co-sponsored Senate Joint Resolution 723, which called for the Tennessee Valley Authority, United States Army Corps of Engineers, and other federal authorities to join Tennessee in "aggressively addressing the Asian carp invasion in Tennessee waterways." On May 11, Powers announced that the Tennessee Department of Health had received $118,309 to expand COVID-19 testing into Stewart County, to help combat the COVID-19 pandemic.

== Positions and committees ==
He is a member of multiple Senate committees and subcommittees which include:

- Senate Government Operations Committee
- Education, Health and General Welfare Subcommittee of Joint Government Operations Committee
- Senate Energy, Agriculture, and Natural Resources Committee
- Judiciary and Government Subcommittee of Joint Government Operations Committee

== Electoral history ==
=== 2019 ===
A special election was held on April 23, 2019 in which Powers ran as a Republican against Democratic Juanita Charles as well as Independent party members Doyle Clark and David Cutting. The results of the special election are shown in the table below.

Tennessee Senate District 22 special general election, 2019
Party	Candidate	Votes	%
Republican	Bill Powers	6,461	53.61%
Democratic	Juanita Charles	5,352	44.41%
Independent	Doyle Clark	155	1.29%
Independent	David Cutting	84	0.70%
Total votes		12,052	100.0%
Republican hold			

=== 2020 ===
Tennessee's 22nd State Senate District general election, 2020
Party	Candidate	Votes	%
Republican	Bill Powers (incumbent)	49,767	62.09%
Democratic	Ronnie Glynn	30,383	37.91%
Total votes		80,150	100.00%
Republican hold			

=== 2024 ===
Tennessee's 22nd Senate district general election, 2024
Party	Candidate	Votes	%
Republican	Bill Powers (incumbent)	45,571	60.96%
Democratic	Karen Reynolds	29,180	39.04%
Total votes		74,751	100.00%
