= Tennessee's 22nd Senate district =

American legislative district

Tennessee's 22nd State Senate district
Senator
| Bill Powers; R–Clarksville |
- Demographics: 61% White; 20% Black; 11% Hispanic; 2% Asian; 1% Other; 5% Multiracial
- Population (2022): 218,450

Tennessee's 22nd Senate district is one of 33 districts in the Tennessee Senate. It has been represented by Republican Bill Powers since a 2019 special election to replace fellow Republican Mark Green.

== Geography ==
District 22 is based in Clarksville, and covers most of, Montgomery County. Other communities in the district include Cunningham and Needmore.

The district is located entirely within Tennessee's 7th congressional district, and overlaps with the 67th, 68th and 75th districts of the Tennessee House of Representatives. It borders the state of Kentucky.

== Recent election results ==
Tennessee Senators are elected to staggered four-year terms, with odd-numbered districts holding elections in midterm years and even-numbered districts holding elections in presidential years.

=== 2020 ===
2020 Tennessee Senate election, District 22
Primary election
| Party | Candidate | Votes | % |
|---|---|---|---|
| Republican | Bill Powers (incumbent) | 8,337 | 52.7 |
| Republican | Doug Englen | 7,468 | 47.3 |
| Total votes | | 15,805 | 100 |
General election
| Republican | Bill Powers (incumbent) | 49,767 | 62.1 |
| Democratic | Ronnie Glynn | 30,383 | 37.9 |
| Total votes | | 80,150 | 100 |
| Republican hold | | | |

=== 2019 special ===
In November 2018, incumbent Mark Green was elected to Tennessee's 7th congressional district, leaving the 22nd Senate district open. Former senator Rosalind Kurita was appointed as a caretaker until a special election for the seat could be held in April 2019.

2019 Tennessee Senate special election, District 22
Primary election
| Party | Candidate | Votes | % |
|---|---|---|---|
| Republican | Bill Powers | 2,782 | 37.3 |
| Republican | Jeff Burkhart | 2,513 | 33.7 |
| Republican | Betty Burchett | 1,297 | 17.4 |
| Republican | Jason Knight | 868 | 11.6 |
| Total votes | | 7,460 | 100 |
General election
| Republican | Bill Powers | 6,461 | 53.6 |
| Democratic | Juanita Charles | 5,352 | 44.4 |
| Independent | Doyle Clark | 155 | 1.3 |
| Independent | David Cutting | 84 | 0.7 |
| Total votes | | 12,052 | 100 |
| Republican hold | | | |

=== 2016 ===
2016 Tennessee Senate election, District 22
Primary election
| Party | Candidate | Votes | % |
|---|---|---|---|
| Republican | Mark Green (incumbent) | 6,183 | 84.2 |
| Republican | Lori Smith | 1,163 | 15.8 |
| Total votes | | 7,346 | 100 |
General election
| Republican | Mark Green (incumbent) | 41,497 | 67.0 |
| Democratic | David Cutting | 20,406 | 33.0 |
| Total votes | | 61,903 | 100 |
| Republican hold | | | |

=== 2012 ===
2012 Tennessee Senate election, District 22
| Party | Candidate | Votes | % |
|---|---|---|---|
| Republican | Mark Green | 31,963 | 53.1 |
| Democratic | Tim Barnes (incumbent) | 28,257 | 46.9 |
| Total votes | | 60,220 | 100 |
| Republican gain from Democratic | | | |

=== 2008 ===
2008 Tennessee Senate election, District 22
| Party | Candidate | Votes | % |
|---|---|---|---|
| Democratic | Tim Barnes | 37,030 | 61.89% |
| Independent | Rosalind Kurita (write-in) | 22,805 | 38.11% |
| Total votes | | 59,835 | 100.00% |
| Democratic hold | | | |

=== 2004 ===
2004 Tennessee Senate election, District 22
| Party | Candidate | Votes | % |
|---|---|---|---|
| Democratic | Rosalind Kurita | 36,806 | 56.87% |
| Republican | Brenda Radford | 27,909 | 43.13% |
| Total votes | | 64,715 | 100.00% |
| Democratic hold | | | |

=== Federal and statewide results ===
| Year | Office | Results |
|---|---|---|
| 2020 | President | Trump 57.4 – 39.8% |
| 2016 | President | Trump 58.4 – 36.2% |
| 2012 | President | Romney 54.6 – 43.9% |
| 2012 | Senate | Corker 60.1 – 35.0% |
