= 2020 United States House of Representatives elections in Tennessee =

- November 3, 2020

All 9 Tennessee seats to the United States House of Representatives
- Turnout: 69.30% ▲14.84 pp
	Majority party	Minority party
Party	Republican	Democratic
Last election	7	2
Seats won	7	2
Seat change	Steady	Steady
Popular vote	1,685,255	1,105,537
Percentage	59.30%	38.90%
Swing	▲0.05%	▼0.29%

Republican
50–60%
60–70%
70–80%
80–90%
Democratic
50–60%
60–70%
70–80%
>90%

The 2020 United States House of Representatives elections in Tennessee was held on November 3, 2020, to elect the nine U.S. representatives from the state of Tennessee, one from each of the state's nine congressional districts. The elections coincided with the 2020 U.S. presidential election, as well as other elections to the House of Representatives, elections to the United States Senate, and various state and local elections.

Following the 2020 elections, no seats changed hands, leaving the Tennessee delegation at a 7-2 Republican majority.

== Overview ==
District	Republican		Democratic		Others		Total		Result
District	Votes	%	Votes	%	Votes	%	Votes	%	Result
District 1	228,181	74.71%	68,617	22.47%	8,625	2.82%	305,423	100.0%	Republican hold
District 2	238,907	67.64%	109,684	31.06%	4,606	1.30%	353,197	100.0%	Republican hold
District 3	215,571	67.30%	97,687	30.50%	7,041	2.20%	320,299	100.0%	Republican hold
District 4	223,802	66.67%	111,908	33.33%	0	0.00%	335,710	100.0%	Republican hold
District 5	0	0.00%	252,155	99.99%	14	0.01%	252,169	100.0%	Democratic hold
District 6	257,572	73.68%	83,852	23.99%	8,154	2.33%	349,578	100.0%	Republican hold
District 7	245,188	69.93%	95,839	27.33%	9,608	2.74%	350,635	100.0%	Republican hold
District 8	227,216	68.47%	97,890	29.50%	6,747	2.03%	331,853	100.0%	Republican hold
District 9	48,818	20.10%	187,905	77.37%	6,157	2.53%	242,880	100.0%	Democratic hold
Total	1,685,255	59.30%	1,105,537	38.90%	50,952	1.79%	2,841,744	100.0%	

Popular vote
Republican	59.30%
Democratic	38.90%
Other	1.79%

House seats
Republican	77.78%
Democratic	22.22%

== District 1 ==
2020 Tennessee's 1st congressional district election
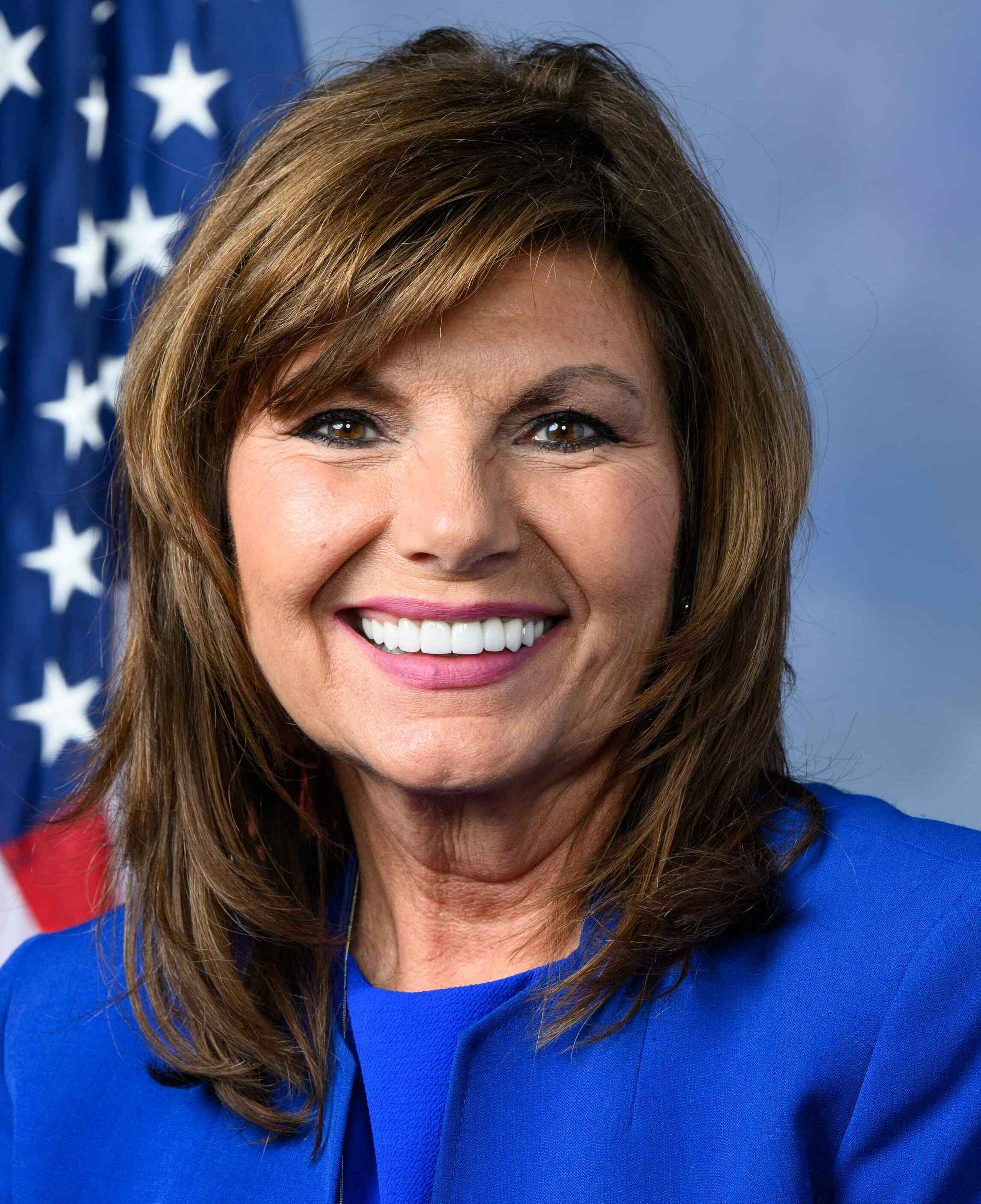

Nominee	Diana Harshbarger	Blair Walsingham
Party	Republican	Democratic
Popular vote	228,181	68,617
Percentage	74.7%	22.5%
- Harshbarger: 40–50% 50–60% 60–70% 70–80% 80–90% Walsingham: 50–60% 60–70%
U.S. Representative before election
Phil Roe
Republican
Elected U.S. Representative
Diana Harshbarger
Republican

The 1st district is based in northeast Tennessee, encompassing all of Carter, Cocke, Greene, Hamblen, Hancock, Hawkins, Johnson, Sullivan, Unicoi, and Washington counties and parts of Jefferson and Sevier counties, and includes the Tri-Cities region. The incumbent was Republican Phil Roe, who was re-elected with 77.1% of the vote in 2018. On January 3, 2020, Roe announced he was retiring from Congress and would not run for a seventh term. His successor, Diana Harshbarger, was the ninth person (not counting caretakers) to represent the district since 1921.

In the general election, Republican Diana Harshbarger won against Democratic challenger Blair Walsingham.

=== Republican primary ===
==== Candidates ====
===== Nominee =====
- Diana Harshbarger, pharmacist

===== Eliminated in primary =====
- Jay Adkins
- Phil Arlinghaus, radio producer
- Richard Baker
- Chance Cansler
- John Clark, former mayor of Kingsport
- Rusty Crowe, state senator
- Steve Darden, former mayor of Johnson City
- Chad Fleenor
- Robert Franklin
- Josh Gapp, physician
- David Hawk, state representative
- Timothy Hill, state representative
- Chuck Miller
- Carter Quillen, mechanical engineer, businessman, and merchant craftsman
- Nichole Williams, former sales representative and former intern for Phil Roe

====== Declined ======
- Dan Eldridge, former mayor of Washington County
- Jeremy Faison, state representative
- Jon Lundberg, state senator
- Jason Mumpower, former state representative
- Ashley Nickloes, Air National Guard pilot and candidate for Tennessee's 2nd congressional district in 2018
- David Purkey, former Tennessee Commissioner of Safety and Homeland Security
- Ron Ramsey, former lieutenant governor of Tennessee
- Phil Roe, incumbent U.S. representative

==== Endorsements ====
Diana Harshbarger

U.S. presidents

- Donald Trump, 45th president of the United States (2017–2021)
Steve Darden

Local officials

- Jeff Banyas, former mayor of Johnson City
Timothy Hill

Federal officials

- Rick Santorum, former U.S. senator from Pennsylvania (1995–2007)

State officials

- Rick Eldridge, state representative

Local officials

- Mike Taylor, mayor of Johnson County

Organizations

- Club for Growth PAC
- House Freedom Fund

==== Polling ====
Poll source	Date(s) administered	Sample size (Note: Key: A – all adults RV – registered voters LV – likely voters V – unclear)	Margin of error	Rusty Crowe	Steve Darden	Josh Gapp	Diana Harshbarger	David Hawk	Timothy Hill	Other	Undecided
Spry Strategies/WJHL 11	July 28–30, 2020	665 (LV)	± 4.5%	16%	9%	12%	16%	6%	10%	17% (Note: Clark with 9%; "another candidate" with 8%)	14%
Spry Strategies/WJHL 11	June 21–24, 2020	800 (LV)	± 4%	14%	6%	6%	22%	6%	11%	13% (Note: Clark with 5%; Adkins with 3%; Williams with 2%; "another candidate" with 3%)	21%

==== Primary results ====
Results by county: Harshbarger: 20–30%; Hill: 50–60%; Crowe: 20–30%; 30–40%; Gapp: 20–30%; Darden: 20–30%; Hawk: 30–40%

Republican primary results
Party	Candidate	Votes	%
Republican	Diana Harshbarger	18,074	19.2
Republican	Timothy Hill	15,731	16.7
Republican	Rusty Crowe	15,179	16.1
Republican	Josh Gapp	13,379	14.2
Republican	Steve Darden	11,647	12.4
Republican	John Clark	8,826	9.4
Republican	David B. Hawk	4,717	5.0
Republican	Nicole Williams	2,803	3.0
Republican	Jay Adkins	1,635	1.7
Republican	Carter M. Quillen	853	0.9
Republican	Richard Baker	298	0.3
Republican	Chad Fleenor	282	0.3
Republican	Phil Arlinghaus	274	0.3
Republican	Robert D. Franklin	229	0.2
Republican	Chuck Miller	189	0.2
Republican	Chance Cansler	147	0.2
Total votes		94,263	100.0

=== Democratic primary ===
==== Candidates ====
===== Nominee =====
- Blair Walsingham, U.S. Air Force veteran

===== Withdrawn =====
- Larry Smith, history professor
- Chris Rowe, U.S. Army veteran (endorsed Walsingham)

==== Endorsements ====
Blair Walsingham

Individuals

- Dani Cook, local personality and health care activist
- Mark Hamill, actor, voice actor, and writer
- Kristen Johnston, actress
- Debra Messing, actress
- Rosie O'Donnell, comedian, producer, actress, author, and television personality
- Piper Perabo, actress
- Andrew Yang, businessman, entrepreneur, non-profit leader and 2020 presidential candidate

Organizations

- Black Coffee Justice
- Humanity Forward
- Income Movement
- Indivisible-Greene County, Tennessee chapter
- Moms Demand Action
- No Dem Left Behind
- Tri-Cities Women of Color
- Washington County Young Democrats

Political parties

- Humanity First Party

==== Primary results ====
Democratic primary results
Party	Candidate	Votes	%
Democratic	Blair Walsingham	6,076	52.7
Democratic	Chris Rowe	3,869	33.6
Democratic	Larry Smith	1,572	13.7
Democratic	Anthony Rock (write-in)	3	0.0
Total votes		11,520	100.0

=== General election ===
==== Predictions ====
Source	Ranking	As of
The Cook Political Report	Safe R	July 2, 2020
Inside Elections	Safe R	June 2, 2020
Sabato's Crystal Ball	Safe R	July 2, 2020
Politico	Safe R	April 19, 2020
Daily Kos	Safe R	June 3, 2020
RCP	Safe R	June 9, 2020
Niskanen	Safe R	June 7, 2020

==== Results ====
Tennessee's 1st congressional district, 2020
Party	Candidate	Votes	%
Republican	Diana Harshbarger	228,181	74.7
Democratic	Blair Walsingham	68,617	22.5
Independent	Steve Holder	8,621	2.8
Write-in		4	0.0
Total votes		305,423	100.0
Republican hold			

== District 2 ==
2020 Tennessee's 2nd congressional district election
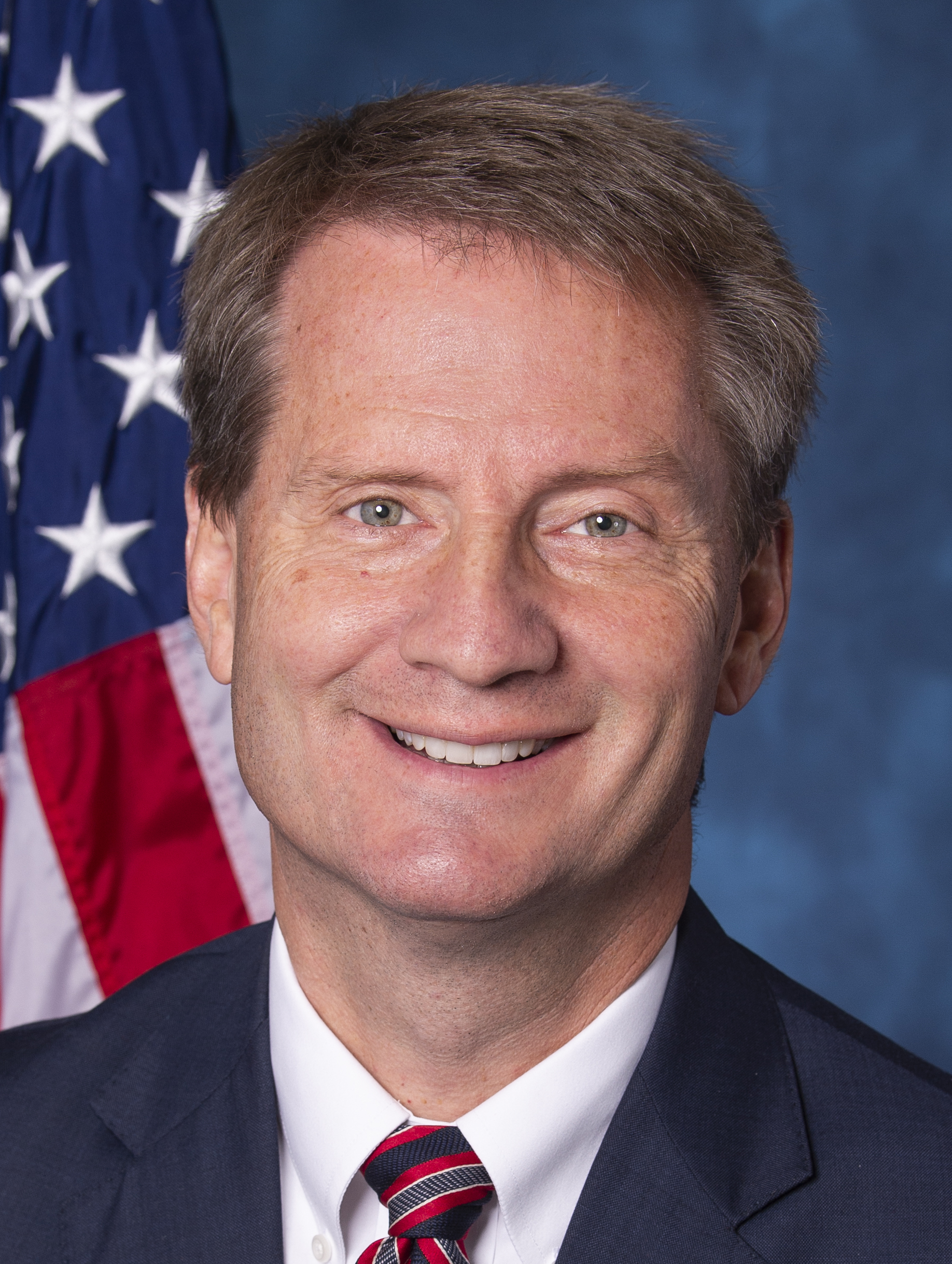

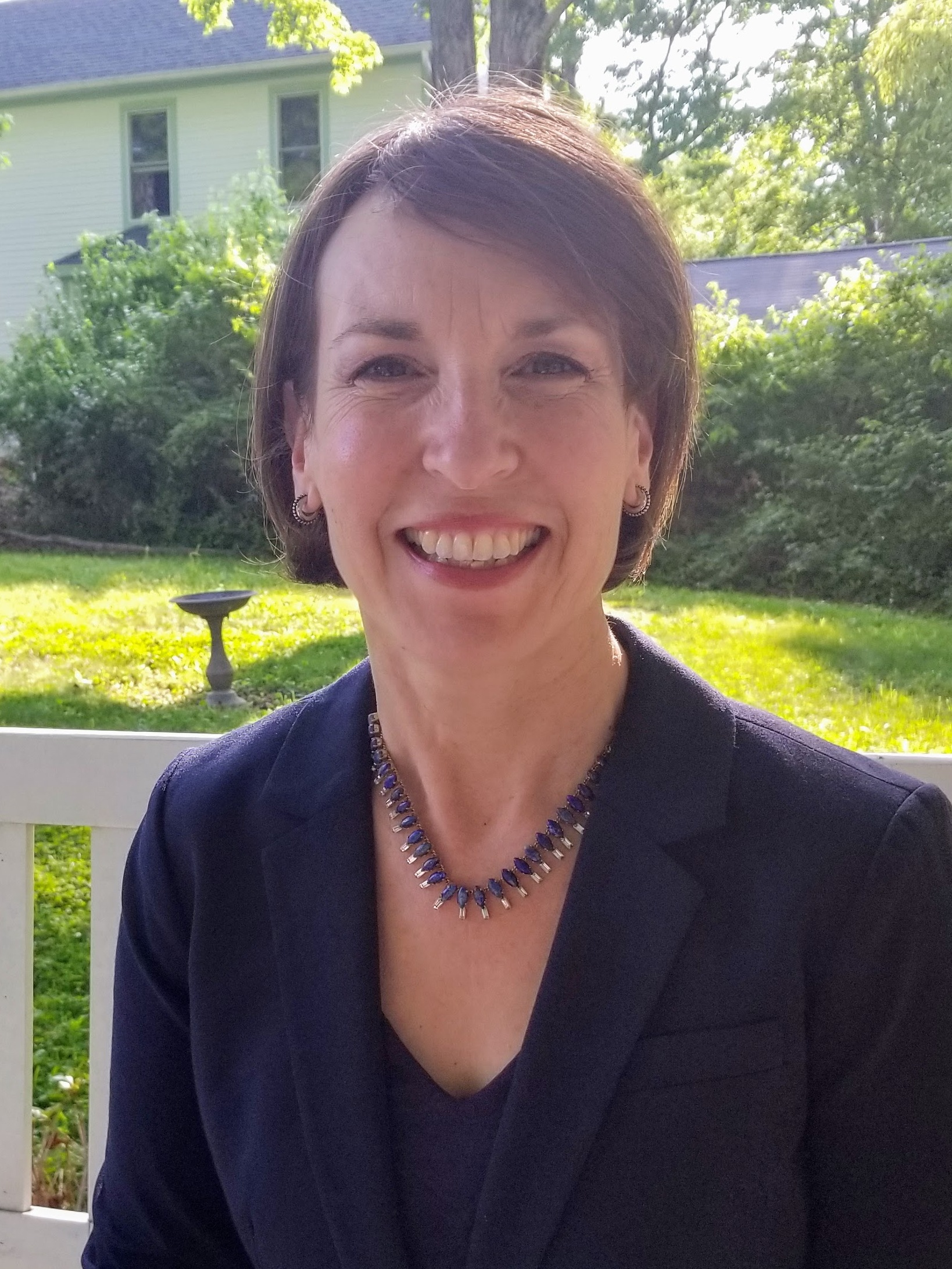
Nominee	Tim Burchett	Renee Hoyos
Party	Republican	Democratic
Popular vote	238,907	109,684
Percentage	67.6%	31.1%
- Burchett: 50–60% 60–70% 70–80% 80–90% >90% Hoyos: 40–50% 50–60% 60–70% 70–80% 80–90%
U.S. Representative before election
Tim Burchett
Republican
Elected U.S. Representative
Tim Burchett
Republican

The 2nd district is located in eastern Tennessee, anchored by Knoxville. The incumbent was Republican Tim Burchett, who was elected with 65.9% of the vote in 2018 and re-elected in 2020.

=== Republican primary ===
==== Nominee ====
- Tim Burchett, incumbent U.S. representative

==== Primary results ====
Republican primary results
Party	Candidate	Votes	%
Republican	Tim Burchett (incumbent)	78,990	100.0
Total votes		78,990	100.0

=== Democratic primary ===
==== Candidates ====
===== Nominee =====
- Renee Hoyos, former executive director of the Tennessee Clean Water Network and nominee for Tennessee's 2nd congressional district in 2018

===== Eliminated in primary =====
- Chance Brown, data engineer

==== Primary results ====
Democratic primary results
Party	Candidate	Votes	%
Democratic	Renee Hoyos	30,287	87.1
Democratic	Chance Brown	4,479	12.9
Total votes		34,766	100.0

=== General election ===
==== Predictions ====
Source	Ranking	As of
The Cook Political Report	Safe R	July 2, 2020
Inside Elections	Safe R	June 2, 2020
Sabato's Crystal Ball	Safe R	July 2, 2020
Politico	Safe R	April 19, 2020
Daily Kos	Safe R	June 3, 2020
RCP	Safe R	June 9, 2020
Niskanen	Safe R	June 7, 2020

==== Results ====
Tennessee's 2nd congressional district, 2020
Party	Candidate	Votes	%
Republican	Tim Burchett (incumbent)	238,907	67.6
Democratic	Renee Hoyos	109,684	31.1
Independent	Matthew Campbell	4,592	1.3
Write-in		14	0.0
Total votes		353,197	100.0
Republican hold			

== District 3 ==
2020 Tennessee's 3rd congressional district election
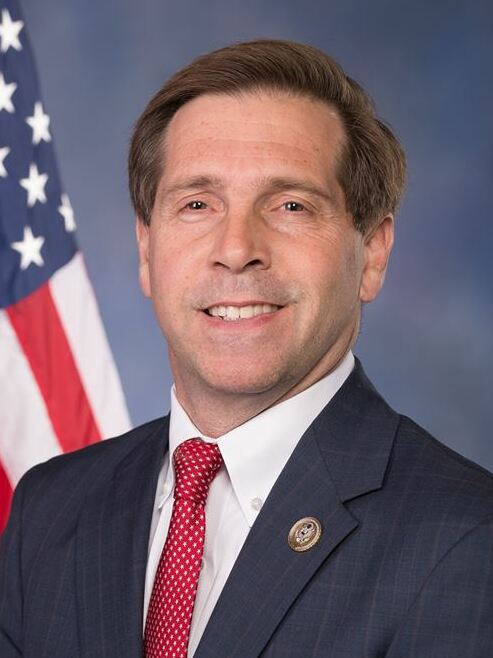

Nominee	Chuck Fleischmann	Meg Gorman
Party	Republican	Democratic
Popular vote	215,571	97,687
Percentage	67.3%	30.5%
- Fleischmann: 40–50% 50–60% 60–70% 70–80% 80–90% >90% Gorman: 40–50% 50–60% 60–70% 70–80% 80–90%
U.S. Representative before election
Chuck Fleischmann
Republican
Elected U.S. Representative
Chuck Fleischmann
Republican

The 3rd district encompasses most of the Chattanooga metro in eastern Tennessee, along with several suburban and rural areas near Knoxville and the Tri-Cities. The incumbent was Republican Chuck Fleischmann, who was re-elected with 63.7% of the vote in 2018 and re-elected in 2020.

=== Republican primary ===
==== Nominee ====
- Chuck Fleischmann, incumbent U.S. representative

==== Primary results ====
Republican primary results
Party	Candidate	Votes	%
Republican	Chuck Fleischmann (incumbent)	69,890	100.0
Total votes		69,890	100.0

=== Democratic primary ===
==== Candidates ====
===== Nominee =====
- Meg Gorman

==== Primary results ====
Democratic primary results
Party	Candidate	Votes	%
Democratic	Meg Gorman	28,578	100.0
Total votes		28,578	100.0

=== General election ===
==== Predictions ====
Source	Ranking	As of
The Cook Political Report	Safe R	July 2, 2020
Inside Elections	Safe R	June 2, 2020
Sabato's Crystal Ball	Safe R	July 2, 2020
Politico	Safe R	April 19, 2020
Daily Kos	Safe R	June 3, 2020
RCP	Safe R	June 9, 2020
Niskanen	Safe R	June 7, 2020

==== Results ====
Tennessee's 3rd congressional district, 2020
Party	Candidate	Votes	%
Republican	Chuck Fleischmann (incumbent)	215,571	67.3
Democratic	Meg Gorman	97,687	30.5
Independent	Amber Hysell	5,043	1.6
Independent	Nancy Baxley	1,990	0.6
Write-in		8	0.0
Total votes		320,299	100.0
Republican hold			

== District 4 ==
2020 Tennessee's 4th congressional district election
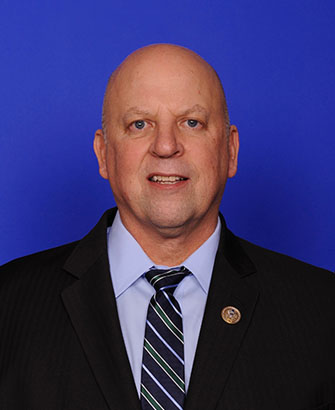

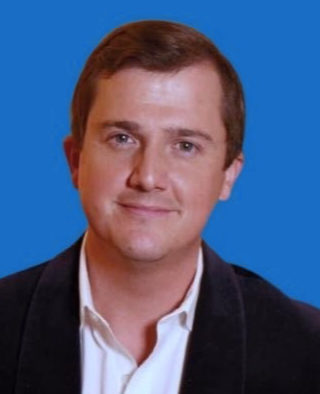
Nominee	Scott DesJarlais	Christopher Hale
Party	Republican	Democratic
Popular vote	223,802	111,908
Percentage	66.7%	33.3%
- DesJarlais: 50–60% 60–70% 70–80% 80–90% 90%+ Hale: 50–60% 60–70% 70–80% 80–90% Tie: 50%
U.S. Representative before election
Scott DesJarlais
Republican
Elected U.S. Representative
Scott DesJarlais
Republican

The 4th district encompasses the southern part of Middle Tennessee, including Murfreesboro and Lynchburg. The incumbent was Republican Scott DesJarlais, who was re-elected with 63.4% of the vote in 2018 and re-elected in 2020.

=== Republican primary ===
==== Nominee ====
- Scott DesJarlais, incumbent U.S. representative

==== Eliminated in primary ====
- Doug Meyer, former chairman of the Franklin County Republican Party
- Randy Sharp

==== Primary results ====
Republican primary results
Party	Candidate	Votes	%
Republican	Scott DesJarlais (incumbent)	55,194	71.0
Republican	Doug Meyer	14,184	18.3
Republican	Randy Sharp	8,298	10.7
Republican	Andrew Kingsolver (write-in)	2	0.0
Total votes		77,678	100.0

=== Democratic primary ===
==== Candidates ====
===== Nominee =====
- Christopher Hale, former Obama White House staffer

===== Eliminated in primary =====
- Lydia Noelle Bivens, development consultant

==== Primary results ====
Democratic primary results
Party	Candidate	Votes	%
Democratic	Christopher Hale	16,152	58.9
Democratic	Noelle Bivens	11,249	41.1
Total votes		27,401	100.0

=== General election ===
==== Predictions ====
Source	Ranking	As of
The Cook Political Report	Safe R	July 2, 2020
Inside Elections	Safe R	June 2, 2020
Sabato's Crystal Ball	Safe R	July 2, 2020
Politico	Safe R	April 19, 2020
Daily Kos	Safe R	June 3, 2020
RCP	Safe R	June 9, 2020
Niskanen	Safe R	June 7, 2020

==== Results ====
Tennessee's 4th congressional district, 2020
Party	Candidate	Votes	%
Republican	Scott DesJarlais (incumbent)	223,802	66.7
Democratic	Christopher Hale	111,908	33.3
Total votes		335,710	100.0
Republican hold			

== District 5 ==
2020 Tennessee's 5th congressional district election
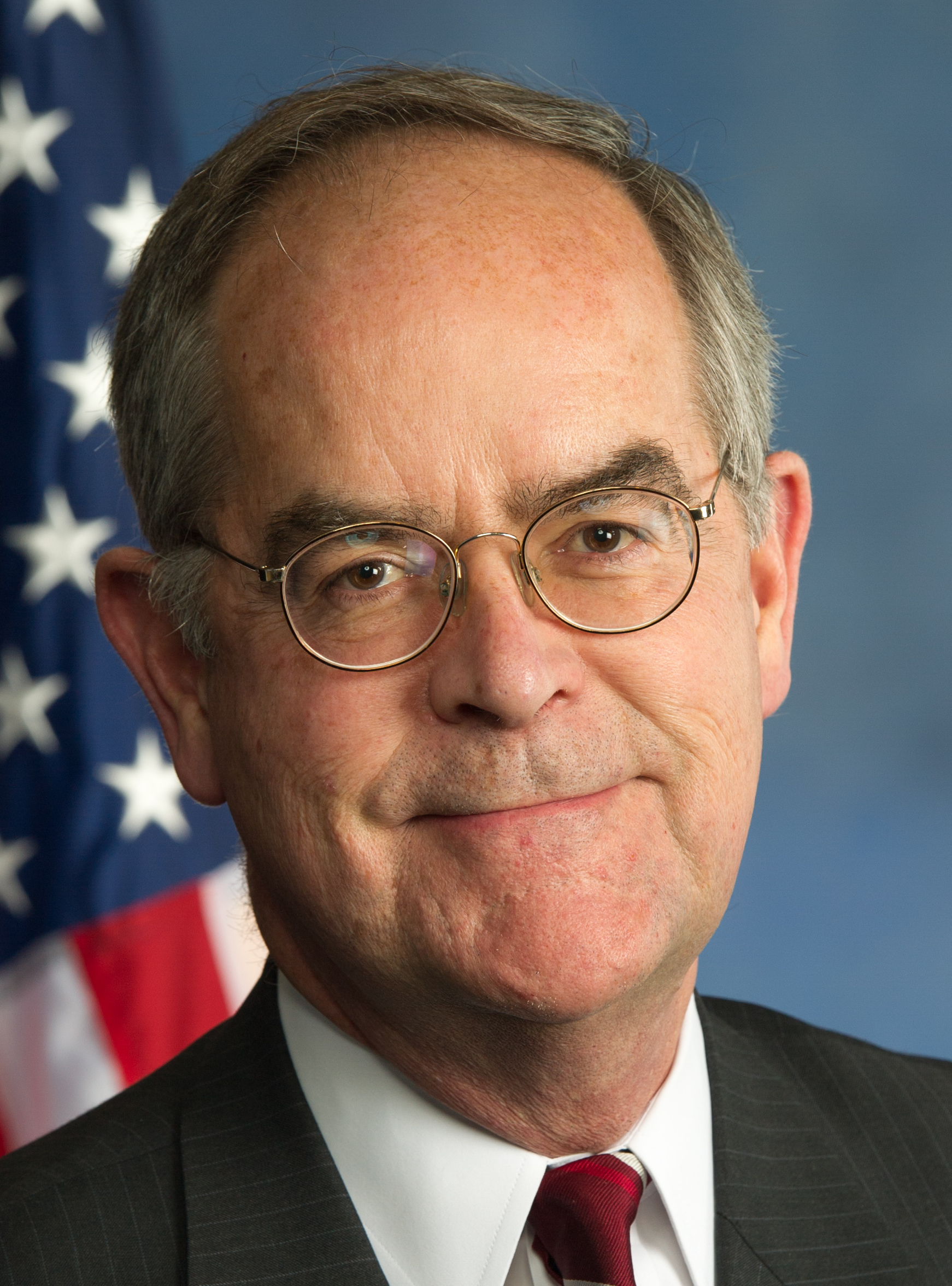
Nominee	Jim Cooper
Party	Democratic
Popular vote	252,155
Percentage	100.0%
- Cooper: >90%
U.S. Representative before election
Jim Cooper
Democratic
Elected U.S. Representative
Jim Cooper
Democratic

The 5th district is centered on Nashville and the immediate surrounding suburbs. The incumbent was Democrat Jim Cooper, who was re-elected with 67.8% of the vote in 2018 and re-elected in 2020.

=== Democratic primary ===
==== Candidates ====
===== Nominee =====
- Jim Cooper, incumbent U.S. representative

===== Eliminated in primary =====
- Keeda Haynes, public defender
- Joshua Rawlings, former Republican candidate for Tennessee House of Representatives in 2014

===== Withdrawn =====
- Justin Jones, activist

==== Endorsements ====
Jim Cooper

Organizations

- Communications Workers of America
- Humane Society of the United States Legislative Fund
- Planned Parenthood Action Fund
- Sierra Club
- Tennessee AFL–CIO
Keeda Haynes

State officials

- Brenda Gilmore, state senator and former state representative (2007–2019)

Organizations

- Blue America
- Demand Universal Healthcare (DUH)
- Democracy for America
- Indivisible
- Progressive Change Campaign Committee

Individuals

- Marianne Williamson, 2020 Democratic presidential candidate
Justin Jones (withdrawn)

Organizations

- Sunrise Movement
Meredith Page (withdrawn)

Organizations

- YDSA
- Rose Caucus

==== Primary results ====
Democratic primary results
Party	Candidate	Votes	%
Democratic	Jim Cooper (incumbent)	50,752	57.1
Democratic	Keeda Haynes	35,472	39.9
Democratic	Joshua Rawlings	2,681	3.0
Total votes		88,905	100.0

=== General election ===
==== Predictions ====
Source	Ranking	As of
The Cook Political Report	Safe D	July 2, 2020
Inside Elections	Safe D	June 2, 2020
Sabato's Crystal Ball	Safe D	July 2, 2020
Politico	Safe D	April 19, 2020
Daily Kos	Safe D	June 3, 2020
RCP	Safe D	June 9, 2020
Niskanen	Safe D	June 7, 2020

==== Results ====
Tennessee's 5th congressional district, 2020
Party	Candidate	Votes	%
Democratic	Jim Cooper (incumbent)	252,155	99.99%
Write-in		14	0.01%
Total votes		252,169	100.0
Democratic hold			

== District 6 ==
2020 Tennessee's 6th congressional district election
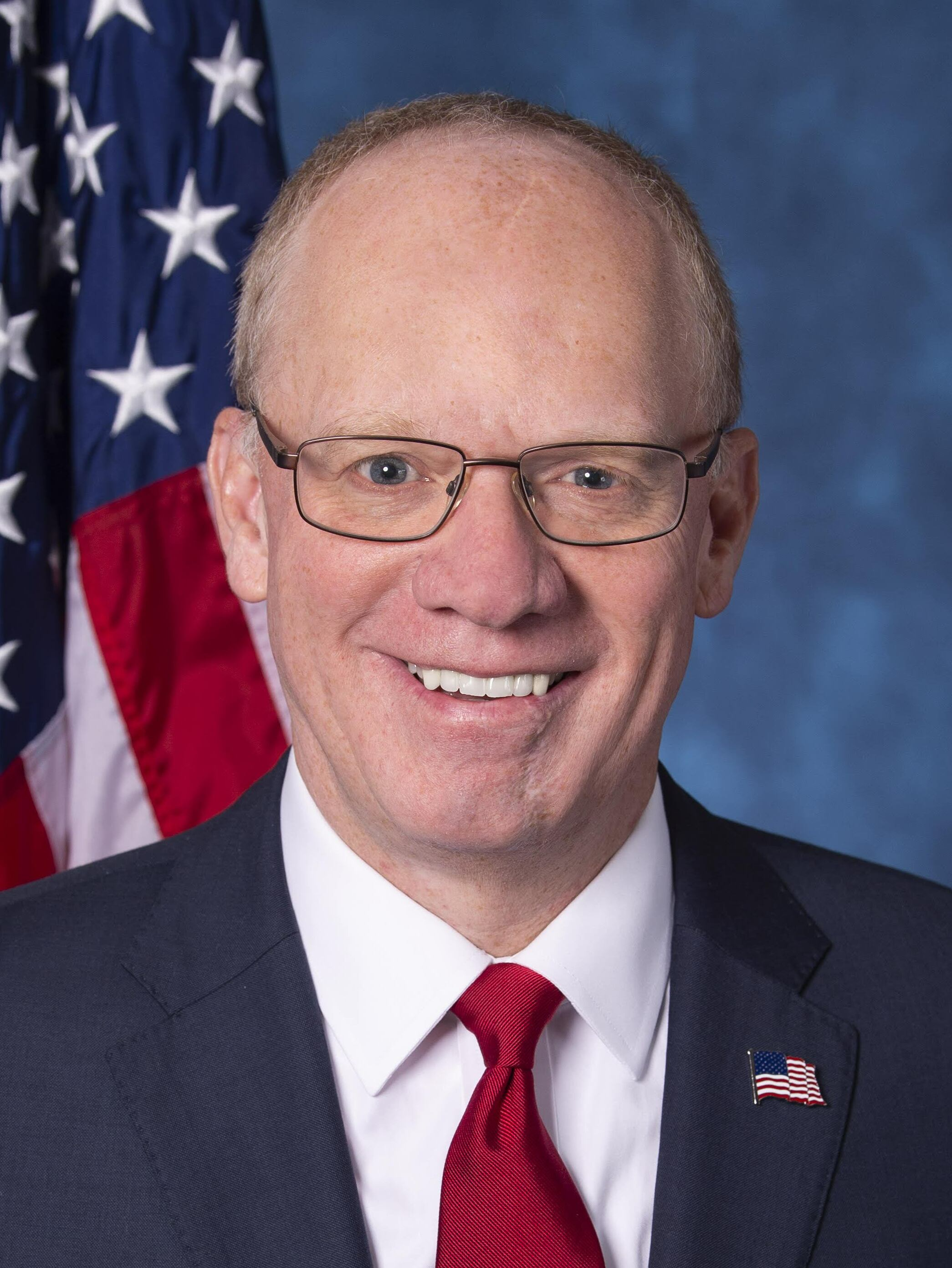

Nominee	John Rose	Christopher Finley
Party	Republican	Democratic
Popular vote	257,572	83,852
Percentage	73.7%	24.0%
- Rose: 50–60% 60–70% 70–80% 80–90% 90%+ Finley: 50–60% 60–70%
U.S. Representative before election
John Rose
Republican
Elected U.S. Representative
John Rose
Republican

The 6th district takes in the eastern suburbs of Nashville and the northern part of Middle Tennessee, including Hendersonville and Lebanon. The incumbent was Republican John Rose, who was elected with 69.5% of the vote in 2018 and re-elected in 2020.

=== Republican primary ===
==== Nominee ====
- John Rose, incumbent U.S. Representative

==== Primary results ====
Republican primary results
Party	Candidate	Votes	%
Republican	John Rose (incumbent)	78,340	100.0
Total votes		78,340	100.0

=== Democratic primary ===
==== Candidates ====
===== Nominee =====
- Christopher Finley, restaurant owner

==== Primary results ====
Democratic primary results
Party	Candidate	Votes	%
Democratic	Christopher Finley	21,375	100.0
Total votes		21,375	100.0

=== General election ===
==== Predictions ====
Source	Ranking	As of
The Cook Political Report	Safe R	July 2, 2020
Inside Elections	Safe R	June 2, 2020
Sabato's Crystal Ball	Safe R	July 2, 2020
Politico	Safe R	April 19, 2020
Daily Kos	Safe R	June 3, 2020
RCP	Safe R	June 9, 2020
Niskanen	Safe R	June 7, 2020

==== Results ====
Tennessee's 6th congressional district, 2020
Party	Candidate	Votes	%
Republican	John Rose (incumbent)	257,572	73.7
Democratic	Christopher Finley	83,852	24.0
Independent	Christopher Monday	8,154	2.3
Total votes		349,578	100.0
Republican hold			

== District 7 ==
2020 Tennessee's 7th congressional district election
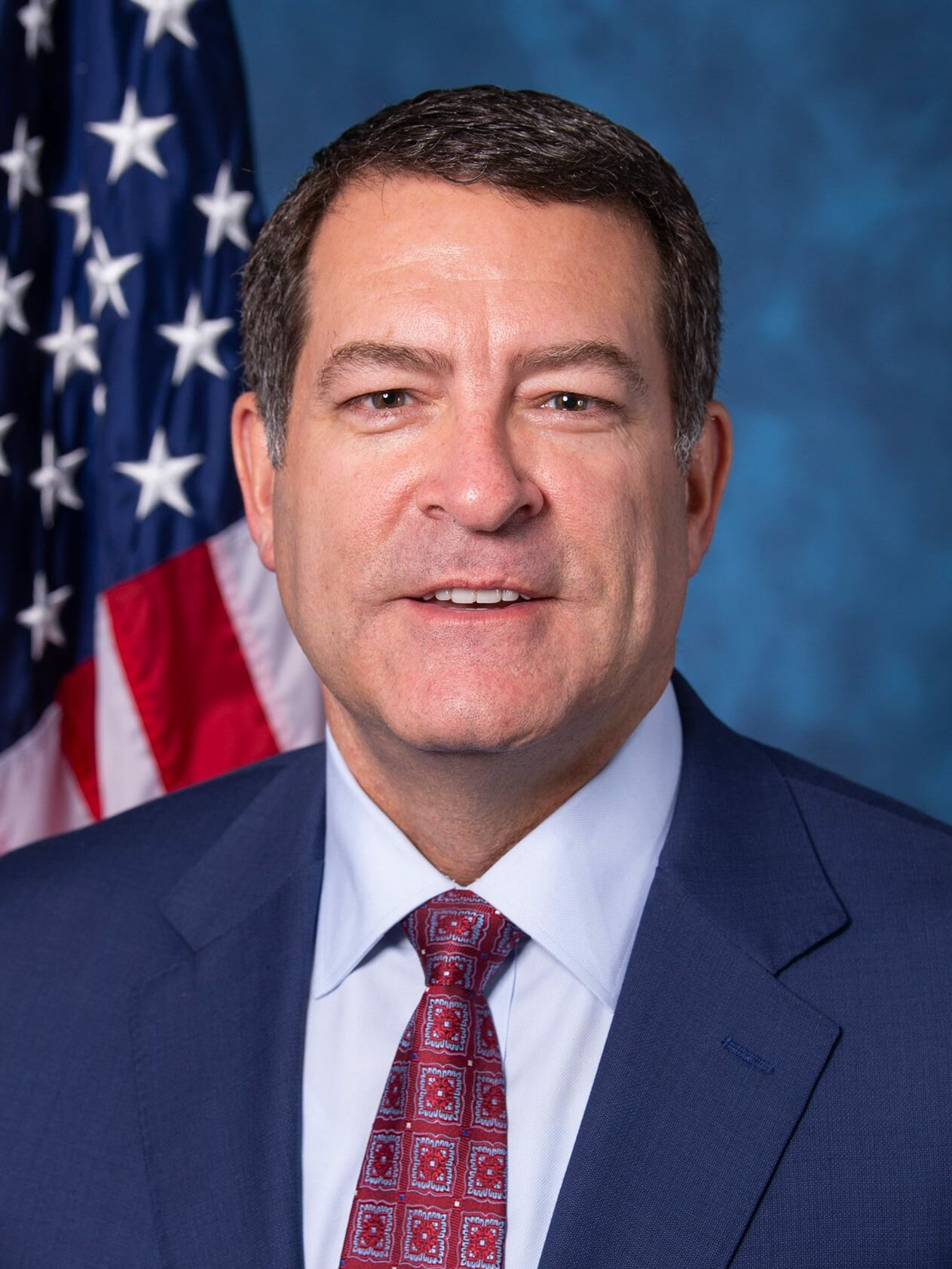

Nominee	Mark Green	Kiran Sreepada
Party	Republican	Democratic
Popular vote	245,188	95,839
Percentage	69.9%	27.3%
- Green: 40–50% 50–60% 60–70% 70–80% 80–90% 90%+ Sreepada: 40–50% 50–60% 60–70%
U.S. Representative before election
Mark Green
Republican
Elected U.S. Representative
Mark Green
Republican

The 7th district encompasses the southern suburbs of Nashville and western rural areas of Middle Tennessee. The incumbent was Republican Mark Green, who was elected with 66.9% of the vote in 2018 and re-elected in 2020.

=== Republican primary ===
==== Candidates ====
===== Nominee =====
- Mark Green, incumbent U.S. representative

==== Endorsements ====
Mark Green

Organizations

- Combat Veterans for Congress

==== Primary results ====
Republican primary results
Party	Candidate	Votes	%
Republican	Mark Green (incumbent)	73,540	100.0
Total votes		73,540	100.0

=== Democratic primary ===
==== Nominee ====
- Kiran Sreepada, public policy consultant

==== Primary results ====
Democratic primary results
Party	Candidate	Votes	%
Democratic	Kiran Sreepada	23,390	100.0
Total votes		23,390	100.0

=== General election ===
==== Predictions ====
Source	Ranking	As of
The Cook Political Report	Safe R	July 2, 2020
Inside Elections	Safe R	June 2, 2020
Sabato's Crystal Ball	Safe R	July 2, 2020
Politico	Safe R	April 19, 2020
Daily Kos	Safe R	June 3, 2020
RCP	Safe R	June 9, 2020
Niskanen	Safe R	June 7, 2020

==== Results ====
Tennessee's 7th congressional district, 2020
Party	Candidate	Votes	%
Republican	Mark Green (incumbent)	245,188	69.93%
Democratic	Kiran Sreepada	95,839	27.33%
Independent	Ronald Brown	7,603	2.17%
Independent	Scott Vieira	2,005	0.57%
Total votes		350,635	100.0
Republican hold			

== District 8 ==
2020 Tennessee's 8th congressional district election
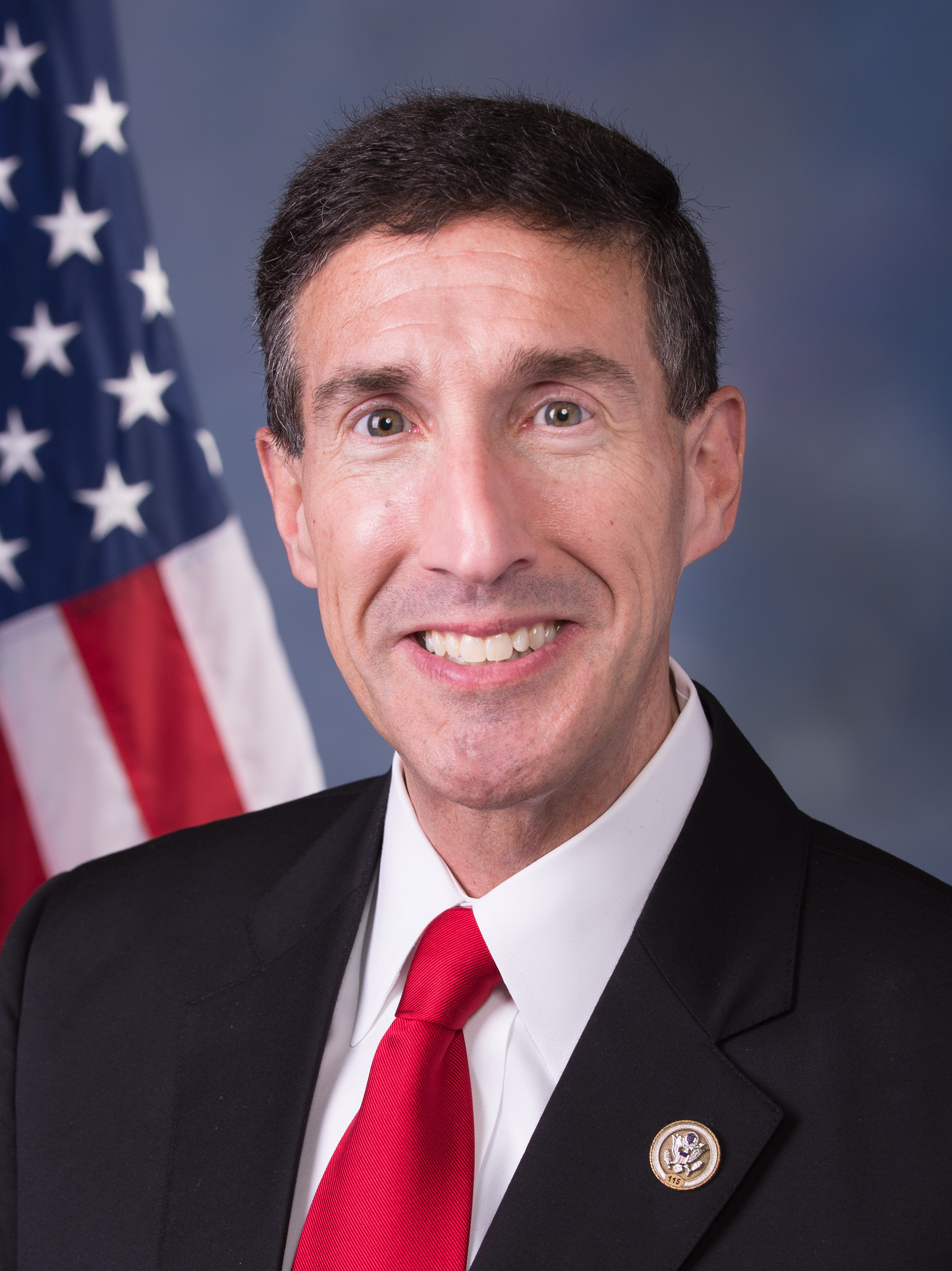

Nominee	David Kustoff	Erika S. Pearson
Party	Republican	Democratic
Popular vote	227,216	97,890
Percentage	68.5%	29.5%
- Kustoff: 40–50% 50–60% 60–70% 70–80% 80–90% >90% Pearson: 40–50% 50–60% 60–70% 70–80% 80–90% >90%
U.S. Representative before election
David Kustoff
Republican
Elected U.S. Representative
David Kustoff
Republican

The 8th district encompasses rural West Tennessee as well as taking in the eastern suburbs of Memphis, including Bartlett, Lakeland, Germantown, and Collierville. As well as the cities of Jackson, Union City, and Paris. The incumbent was Republican David Kustoff, who was re-elected with 67.7% of the vote in 2018 and re-elected in 2020.

=== Republican primary ===
==== Candidates ====
===== Nominee =====
- David Kustoff, incumbent U.S. representative

==== Primary results ====
Republican primary results
Party	Candidate	Votes	%
Republican	David Kustoff (incumbent)	70,677	100.0
Total votes		70,677	100.0

=== Democratic primary ===
==== Nominee ====
- Erika Stotts Pearson, former teacher and nominee for Tennessee's 8th congressional district in 2018

==== Eliminated in primary ====
- Lawrence Pivnick, attorney
- Hollis W. Skinner, former Trenton city councilman and U.S. Army veteran
- Savannah Williamson, former Madison County commissioner

==== Primary results ====
Democratic primary results
Party	Candidate	Votes	%
Democratic	Erika Stotts Pearson	14,510	51.1
Democratic	Savannah Williamson	5,788	20.4
Democratic	Lawrence Pivnick	4,685	16.5
Democratic	Hollis Skinner	3,389	12.0
Total votes		28,372	100.0

=== General election ===
==== Predictions ====
Source	Ranking	As of
The Cook Political Report	Safe R	July 2, 2020
Inside Elections	Safe R	June 2, 2020
Sabato's Crystal Ball	Safe R	July 2, 2020
Politico	Safe R	April 19, 2020
Daily Kos	Safe R	June 3, 2020
RCP	Safe R	June 9, 2020
Niskanen	Safe R	June 7, 2020

==== Results ====
Tennessee's 8th congressional district, 2020
Party	Candidate	Votes	%
Republican	David Kustoff (incumbent)	227,216	68.5
Democratic	Erika Stotts Pearson	97,890	29.5
Independent	James Hart	3,763	1.1
Independent	Jon Dillard	2,984	0.9
Total votes		331,853	100.0
Republican hold			

== District 9 ==
2020 Tennessee's 9th congressional district election
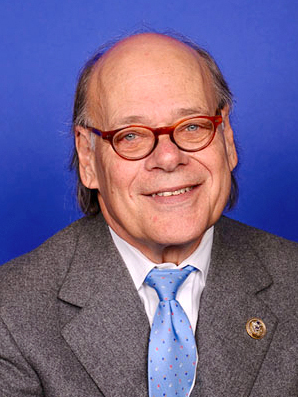

Nominee	Steve Cohen	Charlotte Bergmann
Party	Democratic	Republican
Popular vote	187,905	48,818
Percentage	77.4%	20.1%
- Cohen: 40–50% 50–60% 60–70% 70–80% 80–90% >90% Bergmann: 40–50% 50–60% 60–70%
U.S. Representative before election
Steve Cohen
Democratic
Elected U.S. Representative
Steve Cohen
Democratic

The 9th district is based in Memphis. The incumbent was Democrat Steve Cohen, who was re-elected with 80.0% of the vote in 2018 and re-elected in 2020.

=== Democratic primary ===
==== Candidates ====
===== Nominee =====
- Steve Cohen, incumbent U.S. representative

===== Eliminated in primary =====
- Leo Awgowhat
- Corey Strong, U.S. Navy veteran and former chair of Shelby County Democratic Party

==== Endorsements ====
Steve Cohen

Organizations

- Center for Biological Diversity
- Humane Society of the United States Legislative Fund
- Planned Parenthood
- Sierra Club
Corey Strong

Organizations

- Brand New Congress

==== Primary results ====
Democratic primary results
Party	Candidate	Votes	%
Democratic	Steve Cohen (incumbent)	56,312	84.0
Democratic	Corey Strong	9,994	14.9
Democratic	Leo Awgowhat	768	1.1
Total votes		67,074	100.0

=== Republican primary ===
==== Nominee ====
- Charlotte Bergmann, businesswoman and nominee for Tennessee's 9th congressional district in 2018

==== Primary results ====
Republican primary results
Party	Candidate	Votes	%
Republican	Charlotte Bergmann	12,160	100.0
Total votes		12,160	100.0

=== General election ===
==== Predictions ====
Source	Ranking	As of
The Cook Political Report	Safe D	July 2, 2020
Inside Elections	Safe D	June 2, 2020
Sabato's Crystal Ball	Safe D	July 2, 2020
Politico	Safe D	April 19, 2020
Daily Kos	Safe D	June 3, 2020
RCP	Safe D	June 9, 2020
Niskanen	Safe D	June 7, 2020

==== Results ====
Tennessee's 9th congressional district, 2020
Party	Candidate	Votes	%
Democratic	Steve Cohen (incumbent)	187,905	77.4
Republican	Charlotte Bergmann	48,818	20.1
Independent	Dennis Clark	3,962	1.6
Independent	Bobby Lyons	2,192	0.9
Write-in		3	0.0
Total votes		242,880	100.0
Democratic hold			

== See also ==
- 2020 United States presidential election in Tennessee
- 2020 United States Senate election in Tennessee
- 2020 Tennessee Senate election
- 2020 Tennessee House of Representatives election
- 2020 Tennessee elections
- 2020 United States House of Representatives elections
- 2020 United States elections

== Notes ==
Partisan clients
