= Tim Barnes (politician) =

American politician (born 1958)

Member of the Tennessee Senate from the 22nd district
- In office January 13, 2009 – 2013
- Preceded by: Rosalind Kurita
- Succeeded by: Mark Green

Personal details
- Born: Timothy Kent Barnes; December 28, 1958 (age 67) West Memphis, Arkansas, U.S.
- Party: Democratic
- Education: Harding University, University of Arkansas School of Law
- Profession: Attorney

Timothy Kent Barnes (born December 28, 1958) is a Democratic Party politician in Tennessee, who represented the 22nd district as State Senator from 2009 to 2013. Barnes ran unsuccessfully for the Tennessee House of Representatives in 2006. However, he is perhaps best known for his primary challenge of then-State Senator Rosalind Kurita in 2008. Kurita actually received slightly more votes (19) than Barnes during the actual election, but the Tennessee Democratic Executive Committee, due to crossover voting by Republicans (Tennessee law does not provide for voter registration by political party) ruled that Barnes had received more votes of actual Democrats and was declared the winner under party bylaws. As the Republicans had anticipated Kurita being the winner they did not nominate a candidate who would have been opposing her, had she won. Kurita challenged the executive committee decision in court but was unsuccessful in both her court challenge and a write-in campaign against Barnes, who served a single term and was defeated by Republican Mark Green for re-election in 2012.

Preceded by Rosalind Kurita	Tennessee State Senator, 22nd District; 2008–2012	Succeeded by Mark Green
