= Rosalind Kurita =

American politician

Member of the Tennessee Senate from the 22nd district
- In office January 18, 2019 – April 25, 2019
- Preceded by: Mark Green
- Succeeded by: Bill Powers
- In office January 14, 1997 – January 13, 2009
- Succeeded by: Tim Barnes

Personal details
- Party: Independent (since 2019)
- Other political affiliations: Democratic (before 2019)
- Spouse: George Kurita (m. 1972)
- Children: 3
- Education: University of Arkansas (BA)

Rosalind Kurita (née Culbertson) is an American politician who was formerly Speaker pro tempore of the Tennessee State Senate, who represented State Senate District 22 (Cheatham, Houston, and Montgomery counties), centered on Clarksville. She unsuccessfully sought the Democratic nomination in the 2006 United States Senate election in Tennessee. Kurita was appointed to her old seat on January 22, 2019, to serve as a caretaker until a special election.

== Early life and career ==
Rosalind Culbertson grew up in Midland, Texas, the daughter of a former leader in the Republican Party. A registered nurse, she received her B.A. from the University of Arkansas. She married George Kurita in 1972 and has three children. After her children's births, Kurita created her own small medical marketing business. Kurita began in politics as a county commissioner for Montgomery County.

== Political career ==
=== First Senate tenure ===
In 1996, Kurita won a state senate seat by defeating an incumbent Republican senator. She was re-elected twice, in 2000 and 2004.

In 2005, she was the first major Democratic candidate to enter the 2006 United States Senate election in Tennessee, and initially appeared to be competitive But she dropped out of the race in early April 2006, as a result of financial and organizational challenges.

On January 9, 2007, Kurita was the lone member of the Democratic caucus in the Tennessee Senate to vote together with all 17 Republican members to replace long-serving Democratic Senate Speaker John Shelton Wilder with Republican Ron Ramsey. On January 12, 2007, Ramsey named Kurita Speaker pro tempore, replacing Republican State Senator Micheal R. Williams, who had in the previous legislative session broken with his fellow Republicans to vote in favor of Wilder.

Before 2008 Kurita was mentioned as a possible candidate for the Democratic nomination in Tennessee's 7th congressional district in the 2008 election. The district, represented by Republican Marsha Blackburn (who served with her in the State Senate from 1999 to 2003), includes most of Kurita's state senate district. She also was mentioned as a candidate for the Tennessee U.S. Senate seat held by Republican Lamar Alexander. However, Kurita sought to remain in the State Senate. In the August 7, 2008, Democratic primary for District 22, she was opposed by Tim Barnes, whom she outpolled by just 19 votes, receiving 4,477 votes to Barnes' 4,458 votes. Election officials certified her victory, and no Republican candidate opposed her for the District 22 State Senate seat. However, Barnes contested the results, claiming that Kurita only won because a large number of Republicans crossed over to vote in Tennessee's open Democratic primary. On September 13, Tennessee Democratic Party officials met in Nashville and voted to strip Kurita of the nomination. Party officials in Kurita's district then held a convention and designated Barnes as the party's candidate in the November general election. Kurita had been on bad terms with party leadership because of her vote for Republican Ron Ramsey, enabling him to win election as Senate speaker. Kurita subsequently announced that she would seek re-election in November as a write-in candidate. Her write-in candidacy was unsuccessful, resulting in 23,322 votes, which was not sufficient to overcome Barnes' total of 36,977 votes as the Democratic nominee.

Kurita also sued the state Democratic Party in federal court, seeking to have her name restored to the ballot. Her lawsuit charged that the Tennessee law allowing political party officials to rule on challenges to primary election results violates the Fourteenth Amendment to the U.S. Constitution because it has no procedural rules to protect due process and it does not allow for judicial review. The complaint also contended that Kurita's rights were violated because rules for the party's review of the primary results were not adopted until the morning of the review meeting, and that the Democratic Party officials did not adequately explain their reasons for overturning the election results. On October 15, 2008, Judge Robert L. Echols of the United States District Court for the Middle District of Tennessee dismissed her complaint. His ruling stated that when primary election results are contested, under Tennessee law the primary board (in this instance the Democratic Party executive committee) has the authority to decide on the party's nominee. Kurita said she would appeal to the United States Court of Appeals for the Sixth Circuit, but this effort did not result in the revocation of Barnes having been awarded the nomination. Barnes succeeded Kurita in the State Senate in January 2009.

=== Second Senate tenure ===
In November 2018, State Senator Mark Green was elected to the U.S. House, vacating his senate seat in doing so. On January 14, 2019, the Montgomery County County Commission chose her from among 12 applicants to serve in the Senate until a special election could be called. Kurita did not run in the special election in August 2019.

Kurita was sworn into office on January 18, 2019. During her second stint, Kurita served as an independent, caucusing with the Republicans.
