= 2018 United States House of Representatives elections in Tennessee =

- November 6, 2018

All 9 Tennessee seats to the United States House of Representatives
- Turnout: 54.46% ▼7.46 pp
	Majority party	Minority party
Party	Republican	Democratic
Last election	7	2
Seats won	7	2
Seat change	Steady	Steady
Popular vote	1,279,655	846,450
Percentage	59.25%	39.19%
Swing	▼3.22%	▲5.86%

Republican
50–60%
60–70%
70–80%
80–90%
Democratic
50–60%
60–70%
70–80%

The 2018 United States House of Representatives elections in Tennessee was held on November 6, 2018, to elect the nine U.S. representatives from the state of Tennessee, one from each of the state's nine congressional districts. The elections coincided with the elections of other federal and state offices, including the senate and gubernatorial election.

Following the 2018 elections, no seats changed hands, leaving the Tennessee delegation at a 7-2 Republican majority.

== Overview ==
=== Statewide ===
Party	Votes	Percentage	Seats before	Seats after	+/–
Republican	1,279,655	59.25%	7	7	Steady
Democratic	846,450	39.19%	2	2	Steady
Independents	33,720	1.56%	0	0	Steady
Totals	2,159,825	100.00%	9	9	0

Popular vote
Republican	59.25%
Democratic	39.19%
Other	1.56%

House seats
Republican	77.78%
Democratic	22.22%

=== By district ===
Results of the 2018 United States House of Representatives elections in Tennessee by district:

District	Republican		Democratic		Others		Total		Result
District	Votes	%	Votes	%	Votes	%	Votes	%	Result
District 1	172,835	77.06%	47,138	21.02%	4,309	1.92%	224,282	100.0%	Republican hold
District 2	172,856	65.94%	86,668	33.06%	2,610	1.00%	262,134	100.0%	Republican hold
District 3	156,512	63.68%	84,731	34.48%	4,522	1.84%	245,765	100.0%	Republican hold
District 4	147,323	63.38%	78,065	33.58%	7,063	3.04%	232,451	100.0%	Republican hold
District 5	84,317	32.15%	177,923	67.85%	8	0.00%	262,248	100.0%	Democratic hold
District 6	172,810	69.47%	70,370	28.29%	5,560	2.24%	248,740	100.0%	Republican hold
District 7	170,071	66.86%	81,661	32.10%	2,652	1.04%	254,384	100.0%	Republican hold
District 8	168,030	67.66%	74,755	30.10%	5,560	2.24%	248,345	100.0%	Republican hold
District 9	34,901	19.23%	145,139	79.98%	1,436	0.79%	181,476	100.0%	Democratic hold
Total	1,279,655	59.25%	846,450	39.19%	33,720	1.56%	2,159,825	100.0%	

== District 1 ==
2018 Tennessee's 1st congressional district election
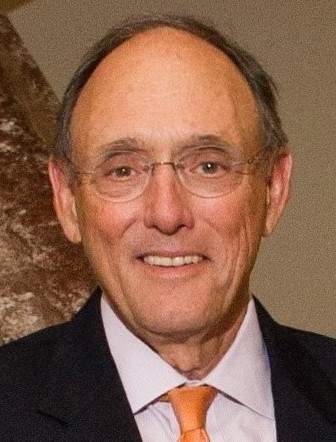

Nominee	Phil Roe	Marty Olsen
Party	Republican	Democratic
Popular vote	172,835	47,138
Percentage	77.1%	21.0%
- Roe: 50–60% 60–70% 70–80% 80–90% >90% Olsen: 50–60% 60–70%
U.S. Representative before election
Phil Roe
Republican
Elected U.S. Representative
Phil Roe
Republican

The 1st district covers the northeastern corner of the states and is anchored by the Tri-Cities area including the cities of Greeneville, Johnson City, and Kingsport. Incumbent Republican Phil Roe, who had represented the district since 2009, ran for re-election. He was re-elected with 78% of the vote in 2016. The district had a PVI of R+28.

=== Republican primary ===
Roe had initially promised to serve only five terms when first elected in 2008, but announced in February 2018 that he would run again that November.

==== Candidates ====
===== Nominee =====
- Phil Roe, incumbent U.S. representative

===== Eliminated in primary =====
- Mickie Lou Banyas, Navy veteran
- James Brooks
- Todd McKinley, writer and political commentator

==== Results ====
Republican primary results
Party	Candidate	Votes	%
Republican	Phil Roe (incumbent)	71,531	73.7
Republican	Todd McKinley	16,173	16.7
Republican	James Brooks	5,053	5.2
Republican	Mickie Lou Banyas	4,250	4.4
Total votes		97,007	100.0

=== Democratic primary ===
==== Candidates ====
===== Nominee =====
- Marty Olsen, professor

==== Results ====
Democratic primary results
Party	Candidate	Votes	%
Democratic	Marty Olsen	13,275	100.0
Total votes		13,275	100.0

=== General election ===
==== Predictions ====
Source	Ranking	As of
The Cook Political Report	Safe R	November 5, 2018
Inside Elections	Safe R	November 5, 2018
Sabato's Crystal Ball	Safe R	November 5, 2018
RCP	Safe R	November 5, 2018
Daily Kos	Safe R	November 5, 2018
538	Safe R	November 7, 2018
CNN	Safe R	October 31, 2018
Politico	Safe R	November 4, 2018

==== Results ====
Tennessee's 1st congressional district, 2018
Party	Candidate	Votes	%
Republican	Phil Roe (incumbent)	172,835	77.1
Democratic	Marty Olsen	47,138	21.0
Independent	Michael Salyer	4,309	1.9
Total votes		224,282	100.0
Republican hold			

== District 2 ==
2018 Tennessee's 2nd congressional district election
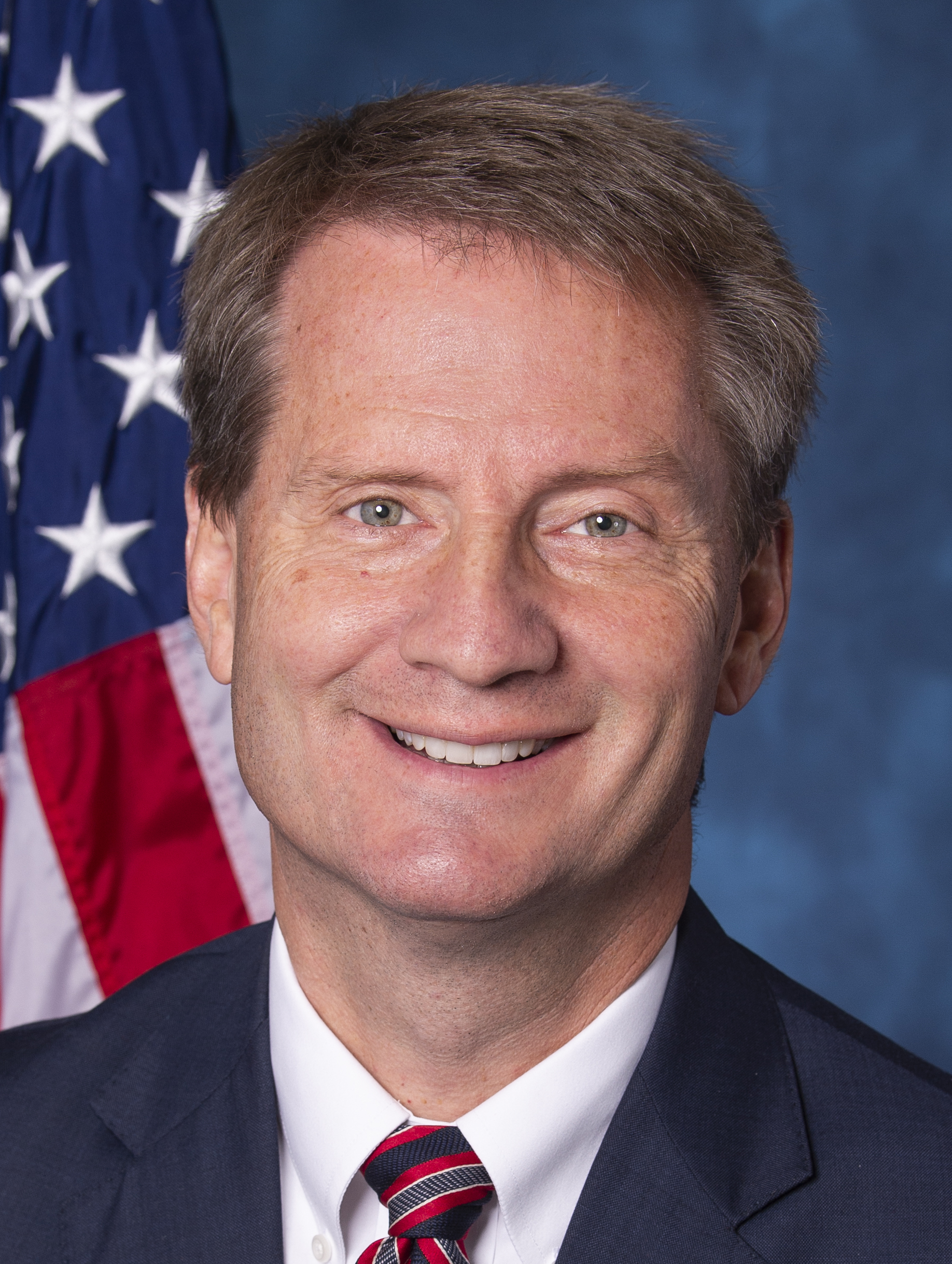

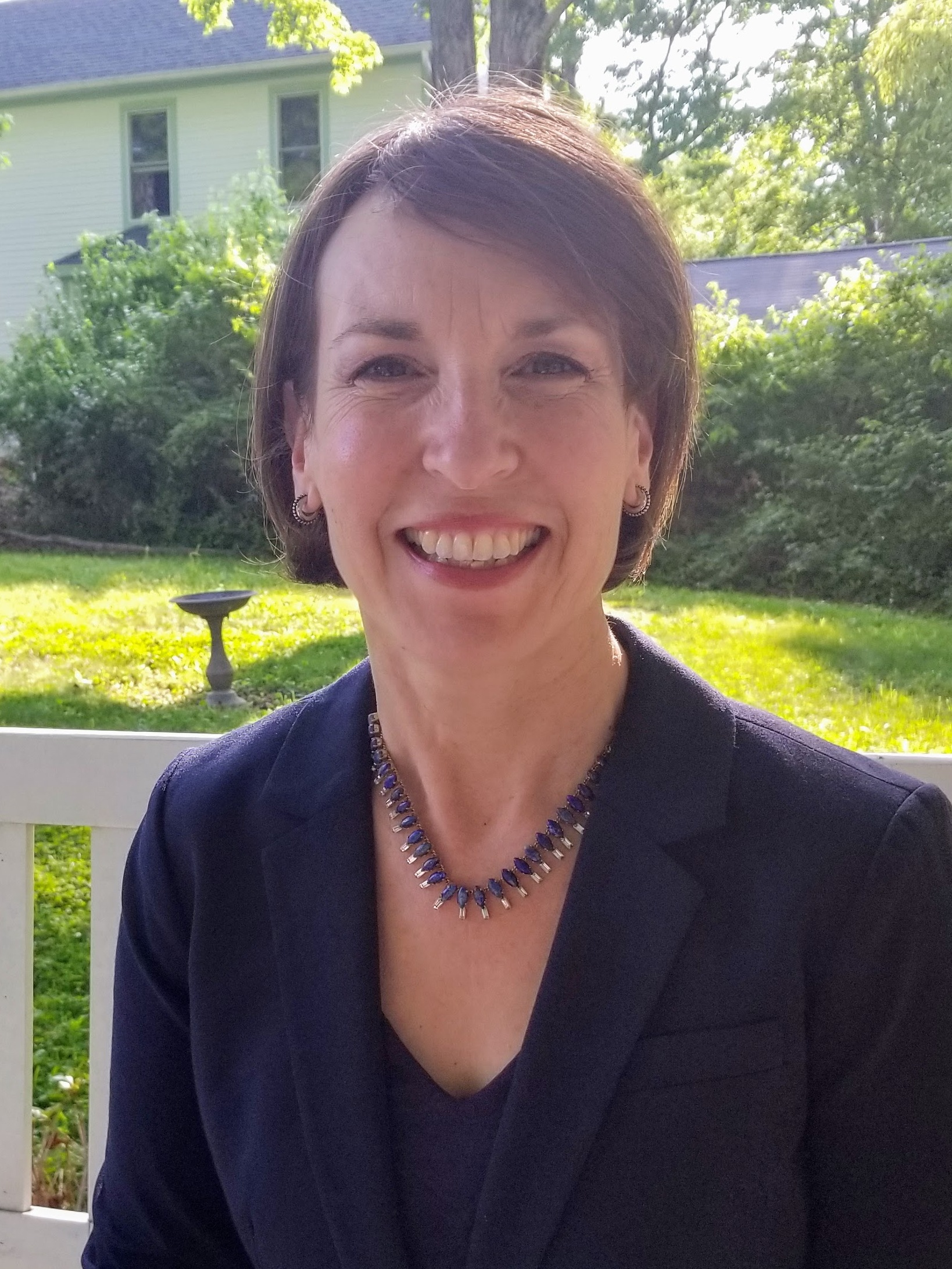
Nominee	Tim Burchett	Renee Hoyos
Party	Republican	Democratic
Popular vote	172,856	86,668
Percentage	65.9%	33.1%
- Burchett: 50–60% 60–70% 70–80% 80–90% >90% Hoyos: 50–60% 60–70% 70–80% 80–90%
U.S. Representative before election
John Duncan
Republican
Elected U.S. Representative
Tim Burchett
Republican

The 2nd district is located in northeastern Tennessee and is centered around Knoxville and its surrounding suburbs; other cities include Jefferson City and Tazewell. Incumbent Republican John Duncan, who had represented the district since 1988, did not run for re-election. He was re-elected with 76% of the vote in 2016. The district had a PVI of R+20.

=== Republican primary ===
On July 31, 2017, Duncan announced that he would not run for re-election in 2018, wishing to instead spend more time with his family.

==== Candidates ====
===== Nominee =====
- Tim Burchett, Knox County Mayor

===== Eliminated in primary =====
- Jason Emert, vice president for business development at First Choice Medical and candidate for state representative in 2014
- Hank Hamblin
- Jimmy Matlock, state representative
- Ashley Nickloes, U.S. Air Force reservist
- Vito Sagliano
- C. David Stransberry

===== Withdrawn =====
- Brad Fullington

===== Declined =====
- Jim Berrong, Blount County sheriff
- John Duncan, incumbent U.S. representative
- Ryan Haynes, former Tennessee Republican Party chair and former state representative
- Doug Overbey, state senator
- Jason Zachary, state representative and candidate for this 2016

==== Endorsements ====
Jason Emert

U.S. senators

- Ted Cruz, U.S. senator from Texas and presidential candidate in 2016
Jimmy Matlock

U.S. representatives

- Jimmy Duncan, incumbent U.S. representative
- Mark Meadows, House Freedom Caucus chairman
Sarah Ashley Nickloes

Organizations

- Winning with Women
- With Honor

Newspapers

- Knoxville News Sentinel

==== Results ====
Results by county: Burchett: 40–50%; 50–60%; 70–80%; Matlock: 40–50%; 70–80%

Republican primary results
Party	Candidate	Votes	%
Republican	Tim Burchett	47,914	48.2
Republican	Jimmy Matlock	35,845	36.1
Republican	Sarah Ashley Nickloes	10,955	11.0
Republican	Jason Emert	2,274	2.3
Republican	Hank Hamblin	855	0.9
Republican	Vito Sagliano	844	0.8
Republican	C. David Stansberry	656	0.7
Total votes		99,343	100.0

=== Democratic primary ===
==== Candidates ====
===== Nominee =====
- Renee Hoyos, executive director of the Tennessee Clean Water Network

===== Eliminated in primary =====
- Joseph Schenkenfelder
- Joshua Williams, psychologist

===== Declined =====
- Madeline Rogero, mayor of Knoxville

==== Results ====
Democratic primary results
Party	Candidate	Votes	%
Democratic	Renee Hoyos	22,203	72.4
Democratic	Joshua Williams	7,076	23.1
Democratic	Joseph Schenkenfelder	1,382	4.5
Total votes		30,661	100.0

=== Independents ===
Declared

- Greg Samples (Libertarian) (Note: Libertarian Party does not have ballot access. Appears on ballot as "Independent.")
- Marc Whitmire

=== General election ===
==== Predictions ====
Source	Ranking	As of
The Cook Political Report	Safe R	November 5, 2018
Inside Elections	Safe R	November 5, 2018
Sabato's Crystal Ball	Safe R	November 5, 2018
RCP	Safe R	November 5, 2018
Daily Kos	Safe R	November 5, 2018
538	Safe R	November 7, 2018
CNN	Safe R	October 31, 2018
Politico	Safe R	November 4, 2018

==== Results ====
Burchett defeated Hoyos to become only the seventh person (not including caretakers) to represent this district since 1909.

Tennessee's 2nd congressional district, 2018
Party	Candidate	Votes	%
Republican	Tim Burchett	172,856	65.9
Democratic	Renee Hoyos	86,668	33.1
Independent	Greg Samples	967	0.4
Independent	Jeffrey Grunau	657	0.3
Independent	Marc Whitmire	637	0.2
Independent	Keith LaTorre	349	0.1
Total votes		262,134	100.0
Republican hold			

== District 3 ==
2018 Tennessee's 3rd congressional district election
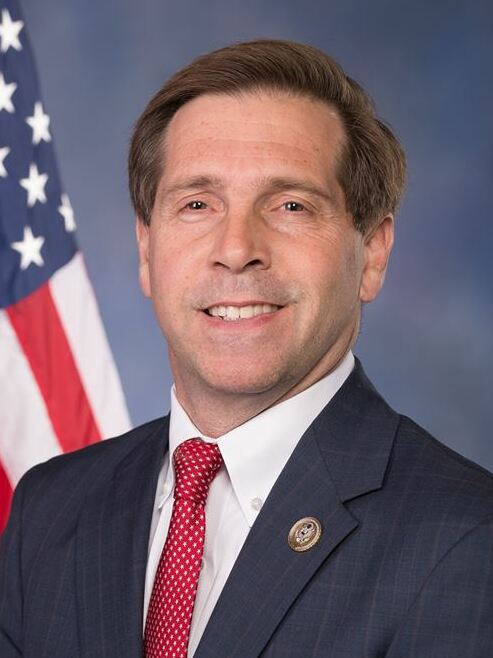

Nominee	Chuck Fleischmann	Danielle Mitchell
Party	Republican	Democratic
Popular vote	156,512	84,731
Percentage	63.7%	34.5%
- Fleischmann: 40–50% 50–60% 60–70% 70–80% 80–90% Mitchell: 40–50% 50–60% 60–70% 70–80% 80–90% >90%
U.S. Representative before election
Chuck Fleischmann
Republican
Elected U.S. Representative
Chuck Fleischmann
Republican

The 3rd district is located in eastern Tennessee and is anchored by Chattanooga; other cities include LaFollette and Oak Ridge. Incumbent Republican Chuck Fleischmann, who had represented the district since 2011, ran for re-election. He was re-elected with 66% of the vote in 2016. The district had a PVI of R+18.

=== Republican primary ===
==== Candidates ====
===== Nominee =====
- Chuck Fleischmann, incumbent U.S. representative

===== Eliminated in primary =====
- Jeremy Massengale
- Harold Shevlin
- William Spurlock Sr.

==== Results ====
Republican primary results
Party	Candidate	Votes	%
Republican	Chuck Fleischmann (incumbent)	67,779	79.4
Republican	Jeremy Massengale	10,212	12.0
Republican	William Spurlock Sr.	5,352	6.3
Republican	Harold Shevlin	2,055	2.4
Total votes		85,398	100.0

=== Democratic primary ===
==== Candidates ====
===== Nominee =====
- Danielle Mitchell, doctor

==== Results ====
Democratic primary results
Party	Candidate	Votes	%
Democratic	Danielle Mitchell	30,462	100.0
Total votes		30,462	100.0

=== General election ===
==== Predictions ====
Source	Ranking	As of
The Cook Political Report	Safe R	November 5, 2018
Inside Elections	Safe R	November 5, 2018
Sabato's Crystal Ball	Safe R	November 5, 2018
RCP	Safe R	November 5, 2018
Daily Kos	Safe R	November 5, 2018
538	Safe R	November 7, 2018
CNN	Safe R	October 31, 2018
Politico	Safe R	November 4, 2018

==== Results ====
Tennessee's 3rd congressional district, 2018
Party	Candidate	Votes	%
Republican	Chuck Fleischmann (incumbent)	156,512	63.7
Democratic	Danielle Mitchell	84,731	34.5
Independent	Rick Tyler	4,522	1.8
Total votes		245,765	100.0
Republican hold			

== District 4 ==
2018 Tennessee's 4th congressional district election
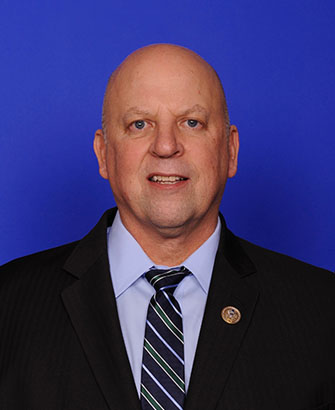

Nominee	Scott DesJarlais	Mariah Phillips
Party	Republican	Democratic
Popular vote	147,323	78,065
Percentage	63.4%	33.6%
- DesJarlais: 40–50% 50–60% 60–70% 70–80% 80–90% Phillips: 40–50% 50–60% 60–70% 70–80% 80–90%
U.S. Representative before election
Scott DesJarlais
Republican
Elected U.S. Representative
Scott DesJarlais
Republican

The 4th district is anchored by Murfreesboro in southern Tennessee; other cities include Cleveland and Mount Pleasant. Incumbent Republican Scott DesJarlais, who had represented the district since 2011, ran for re-election. He was re-elected with 65% of the vote in 2016. The district had a PVI of R+20.

=== Republican primary ===
==== Candidates ====
===== Nominee =====
- Scott DesJarlais, incumbent U.S. representative

===== Eliminated in primary =====
- Jack Maddux, U.S. Navy veteran, former police officer and business manager

==== Results ====
Republican primary results
Party	Candidate	Votes	%
Republican	Scott DesJarlais (incumbent)	61,990	70.0
Republican	Jack Maddux	26,572	30.0
Total votes		88,562	100.0

=== Democratic primary ===
==== Candidates ====
===== Nominee =====
- Mariah Phillips, retail store manager, teacher, and businesswoman

===== Eliminated in primary =====
- Christopher Hale, nonprofit executive and former Obama White House intern
- Steven Reynolds, manager in the construction industry and nominee for this seat in 2016

==== Results ====
Democratic primary results
Party	Candidate	Votes	%
Democratic	Mariah Phillips	15,468	47.5
Democratic	Christopher Hale	11,305	34.7
Democratic	Steven Reynolds	5,786	17.8
Total votes		32,559	100.0

=== General election ===
==== Predictions ====
Source	Ranking	As of
The Cook Political Report	Safe R	November 5, 2018
Inside Elections	Safe R	November 5, 2018
Sabato's Crystal Ball	Safe R	November 5, 2018
RCP	Safe R	November 5, 2018
Daily Kos	Safe R	November 5, 2018
538	Safe R	November 7, 2018
CNN	Safe R	October 31, 2018
Politico	Safe R	November 4, 2018

==== Results ====
Tennessee's 4th congressional district, 2018
Party	Candidate	Votes	%
Republican	Scott DesJarlais (incumbent)	147,323	63.4
Democratic	Mariah Phillips	78,065	33.6
Independent	Michael Shupe	7,056	3.0
Independent	Russell Wayne Steele (write-in)	7	0.0
Total votes		232,451	100.0
Republican hold			

== District 5 ==
2018 Tennessee's 5th congressional district election
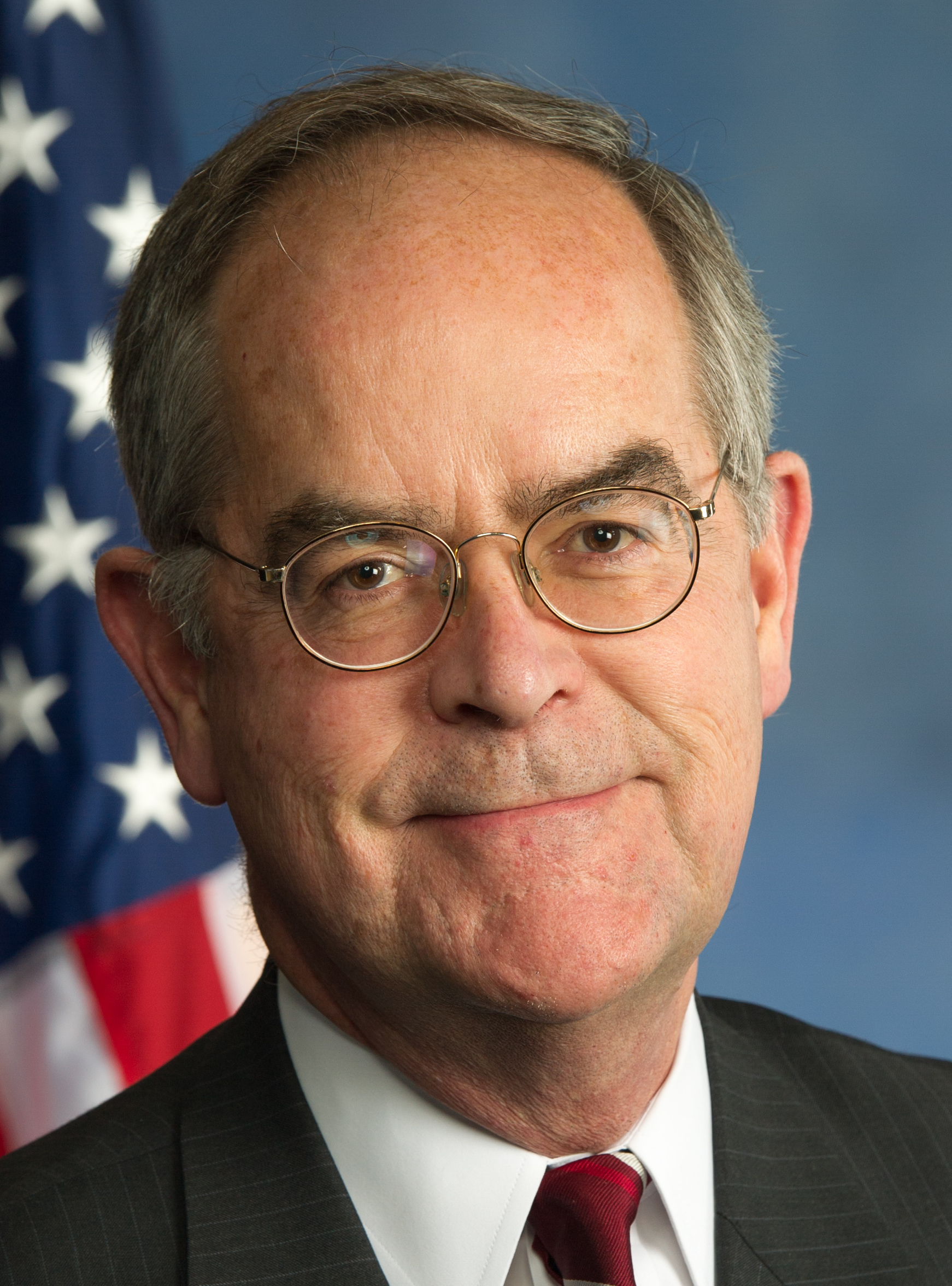

Nominee	Jim Cooper	Jody Ball
Party	Democratic	Republican
Popular vote	177,923	84,317
Percentage	67.8%	32.2%
- Cooper: 50–60% 60–70% 70–80% 80–90% 90%+ Ball: 50–60% 60–70% Tie: 50–60%
U.S. Representative before election
Jim Cooper
Democratic
Elected U.S. Representative
Jim Cooper
Democratic

The 5th district is centered around the state capital, Nashville, and the surrounding suburbs including the cities of Ashland City and Dickson. Incumbent Democrat Jim Cooper, who had represented the district since 2003 and previously represented the 4th district from 1983 until 1995, ran for re-election. He was re-elected with 63% of the vote in 2016. The district had a PVI of D+7.

=== Democratic primary ===
==== Candidates ====
===== Nominee =====
- Jim Cooper, incumbent U.S. representative

==== Results ====
Democratic primary results
Party	Candidate	Votes	%
Democratic	Jim Cooper (incumbent)	69,937	100.0
Total votes		69,937	100.0

=== Republican primary ===
==== Candidates ====
===== Nominee =====
- Jody Ball, former Texas law enforcement officer and business owner

===== Eliminated in primary =====
- Glen Dean

===== Withdrawn =====
- Chaz Allison

==== Results ====
Republican primary results
Party	Candidate	Votes	%
Republican	Jody Ball	20,125	55.8
Republican	Glen Dean	15,959	44.2
Total votes		36,084	100.0

=== General election ===
==== Predictions ====
Source	Ranking	As of
The Cook Political Report	Safe D	November 5, 2018
Inside Elections	Safe D	November 5, 2018
Sabato's Crystal Ball	Safe D	November 5, 2018
RCP	Safe D	November 5, 2018
Daily Kos	Safe D	November 5, 2018
538	Safe D	November 7, 2018
CNN	Safe D	October 31, 2018
Politico	Safe D	November 4, 2018

==== Results ====
Tennessee's 5th congressional district, 2018
Party	Candidate	Votes	%
Democratic	Jim Cooper (incumbent)	177,923	67.8
Republican	Jody Ball	84,317	32.2
Independent	Marshal Weaver (write-in)	8	0.0
Total votes		262,248	100.0
Democratic hold			

== District 6 ==
2018 Tennessee's 6th congressional district election
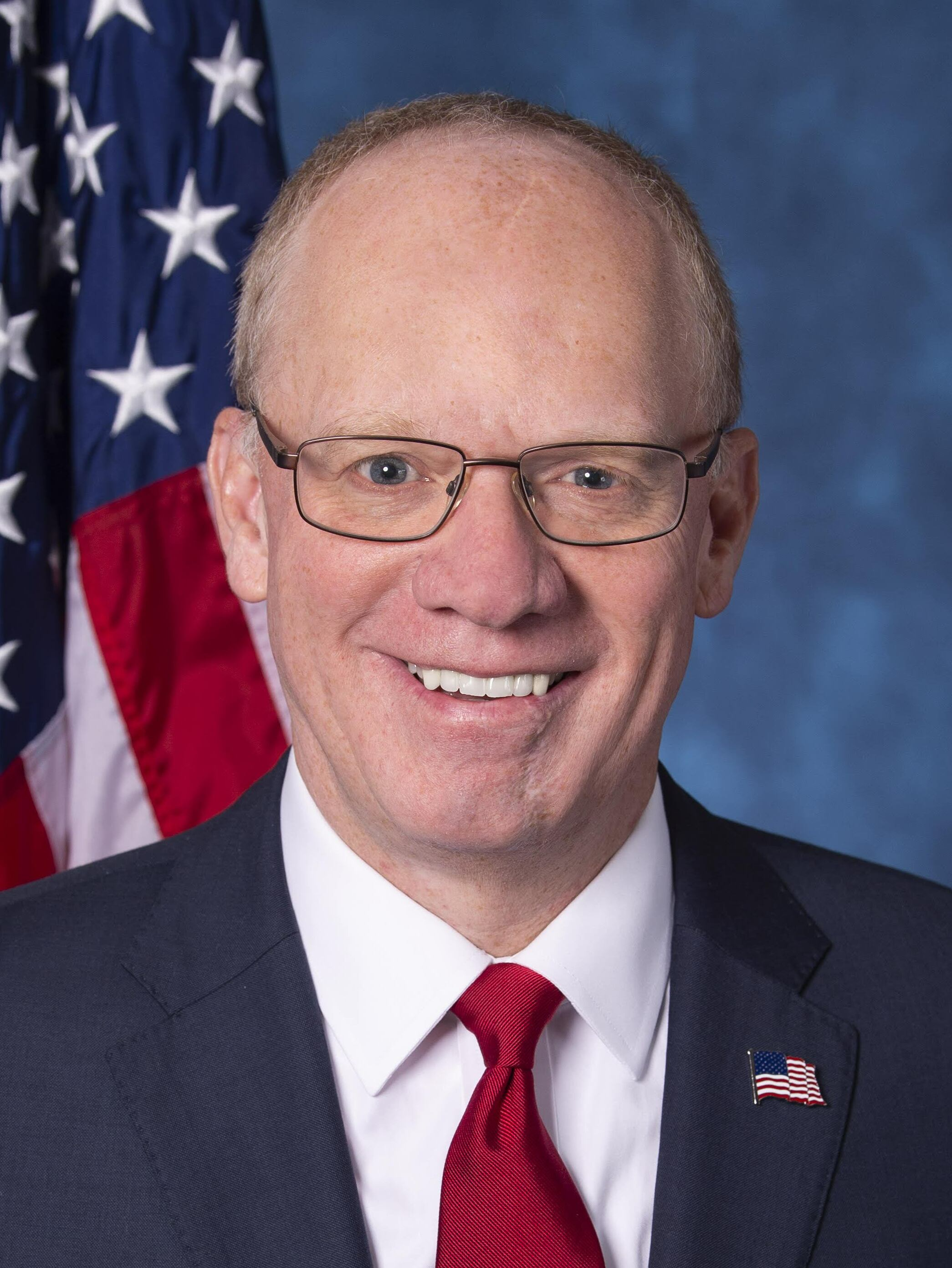

Nominee	John Rose	Dawn Barlow
Party	Republican	Democratic
Popular vote	172,810	70,370
Percentage	69.5%	28.3%
- Rose: 40–50% 50–60% 60–70% 70–80% 80–90% Barlow: 50–60% 70–80%
U.S. Representative before election
Diane Black
Republican
Elected U.S. Representative
John Rose
Republican

The 6th district is located in middle Tennessee including Cookeville, Gallatin, Hendersonville, and Lebanon. Incumbent Republican Diane Black, who had represented the district since 2011, did not run for re-election. She was re-elected with 71% of the vote in 2016. The district had a PVI of R+24.

=== Republican primary ===
Black ran for governor instead of re-election.

==== Candidates ====
===== Nominee =====
- John Rose, former Agriculture Commissioner of Tennessee

===== Eliminated in primary =====
- Bob Corlew, former state judge
- Judd Matheny, former state representative
- Christopher Monday
- Lavern Vivio

===== Declined =====
- Diane Black, incumbent U.S. representative

==== Endorsements ====
Bob Corlew

Organizations

- Tennessee Right to Life
Judd Matheny

U.S. representatives

- Dana Rohrabacher (R-CA)

Organizations

- House Freedom Caucus
- NRA Political Victory Fund

==== Results ====
Results by county: Rose: 30–40%; 40–50%; 50–60%; 60–70%; Corlew: 30–40%; 40–50%; Matheny: 60–70%

Republican primary results
Party	Candidate	Votes	%
Republican	John Rose	43,788	41.3
Republican	Bob Corlew	33,088	31.2
Republican	Judd Matheny	16,753	15.9
Republican	Lavern Vivio	9,506	9.0
Republican	Christopher Monday	3,021	2.9
Total votes		106,156	100.0

=== Democratic primary ===
==== Candidates ====
===== Nominee =====
- Dawn Barlow, director of hospital medicine at Livingston Regional Hospital

===== Eliminated in primary =====
- Christopher Finley
- Peter Heffernan
- Merrilee Wineinger

===== Withdrawn =====
- Stephen Brandon

==== Results ====
Democratic primary results
Party	Candidate	Votes	%
Democratic	Dawn Barlow	16,875	54.5
Democratic	Merrilee Wineinger	6,828	22.0
Democratic	Christopher Finley	4,662	15.1
Democratic	Peter Heffernan	2,590	8.4
Total votes		30,955	100.0

=== Independents ===
Declared

- Lloyd Dunn
- David Ross (Libertarian) (Note: Libertarian Party does not have ballot access. Appears on ballot as "Independent.")

=== General election ===
==== Predictions ====
Source	Ranking	As of
The Cook Political Report	Safe R	November 5, 2018
Inside Elections	Safe R	November 5, 2018
Sabato's Crystal Ball	Safe R	November 5, 2018
RCP	Safe R	November 5, 2018
Daily Kos	Safe R	November 5, 2018
538	Safe R	November 7, 2018
CNN	Safe R	October 31, 2018
Politico	Safe R	November 4, 2018

==== Results ====
Tennessee's 6th congressional district, 2018
Party	Candidate	Votes	%
Republican	John Rose	172,810	69.5
Democratic	Dawn Barlow	70,370	28.3
Independent	David Ross	3,426	1.4
Independent	Lloyd Dunn	2,134	0.8
Total votes		248,740	100.0
Republican hold			

== District 7 ==
2018 Tennessee's 7th congressional district election
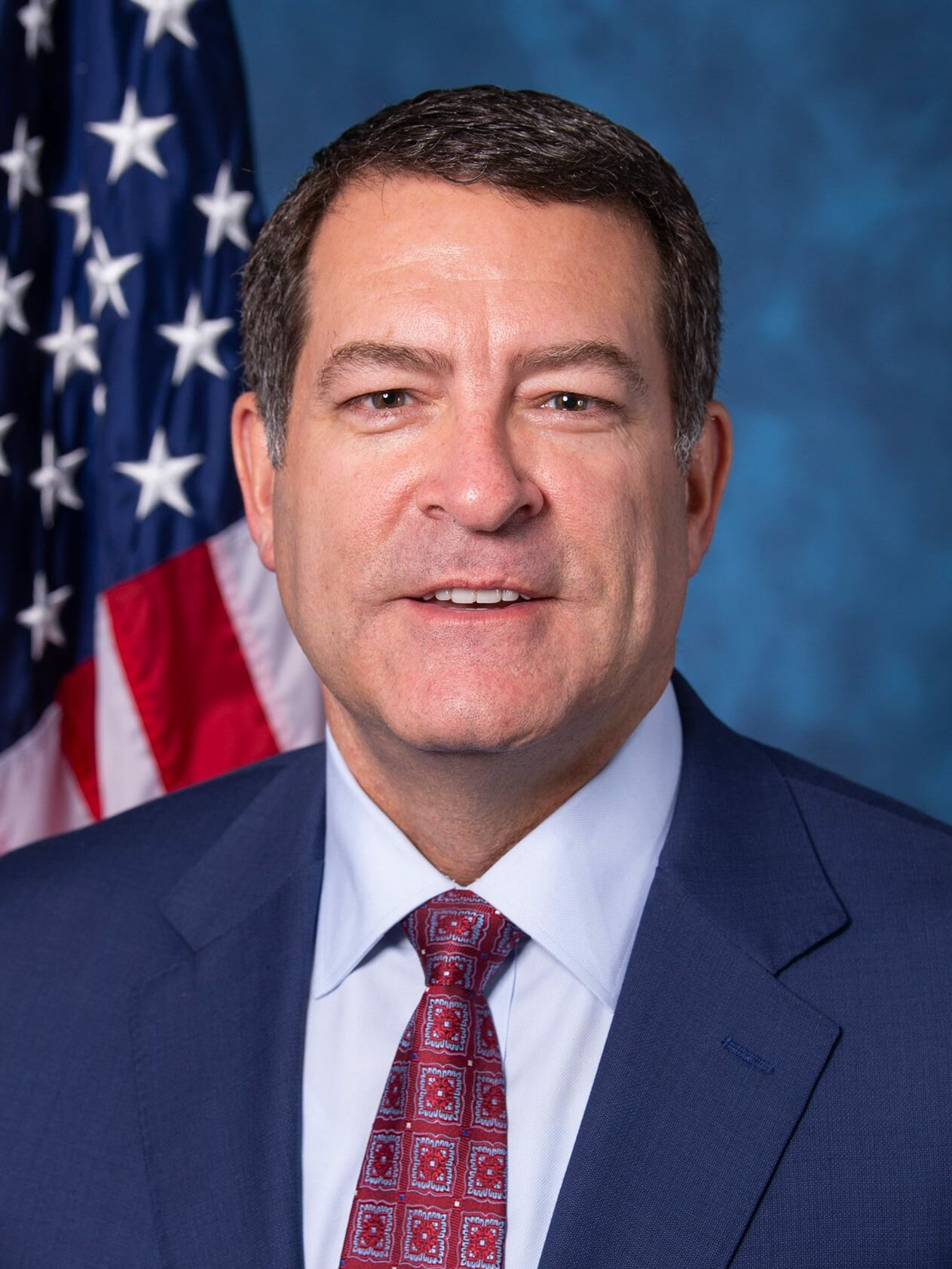

Nominee	Mark Green	Justin Kanew
Party	Republican	Democratic
Popular vote	170,071	81,661
Percentage	66.9%	32.1%
- Green: 50–60% 60–70% 70–80% 80–90%
U.S. Representative before election
Marsha Blackburn
Republican
Elected U.S. Representative
Mark Green
Republican

The 7th district is centered around the Nashville metropolitan area including the Nashville suburbs such as Brentwood and Franklin; other cities include Clarksville and Lawrenceburg. Incumbent Republican Marsha Blackburn, who had represented the district since 2003, did not run for re-election. She was re-elected with 72% of the vote in 2016. The district had a PVI of R+20.

=== Republican primary ===
Blackburn was expected to run for re-election until Senator Bob Corker announced he would retire. After Corker's announcement, she announced on October 5, 2017, she would run for Corker's seat in the U.S. Senate.

==== Candidates ====
===== Nominee =====
- Mark Green, state senator

===== Withdrawn =====
- Lee Thomas Miller, music producer

===== Declined =====
- Ken Moore, mayor of Franklin

==== Results ====
Republican primary results
Party	Candidate	Votes	%
Republican	Mark Green	79,393	100.0
Total votes		79,393	100.0

=== Democratic primary ===
==== Candidates ====
===== Nominee =====
- Justin Kanew, psychologist and former contestant on The Amazing Race 15 & The Amazing Race 18

===== Eliminated in primary =====
- Matt Reel, U.S. Army Special Forces member and former Democratic staffer

==== Results ====
Democratic primary results
Party	Candidate	Votes	%
Democratic	Justin Kanew	20,810	62.0
Democratic	Matt Reel	12,741	38.0
Total votes		33,551	100.0

=== General election ===
==== Predictions ====
Source	Ranking	As of
The Cook Political Report	Safe R	November 5, 2018
Inside Elections	Safe R	November 5, 2018
Sabato's Crystal Ball	Safe R	November 5, 2018
RCP	Safe R	November 5, 2018
Daily Kos	Safe R	November 5, 2018
538	Safe R	November 7, 2018
CNN	Safe R	October 31, 2018
Politico	Safe R	November 4, 2018

==== Results ====
Tennessee's 7th congressional district, 2018
Party	Candidate	Votes	%
Republican	Mark Green	170,071	66.9
Democratic	Justin Kanew	81,661	32.1
Independent	Leonard Ladner	1,582	0.6
Independent	Brent Legendre	1,070	0.4
Total votes		254,384	100.0
Republican hold			

== District 8 ==
2018 Tennessee's 8th congressional district election
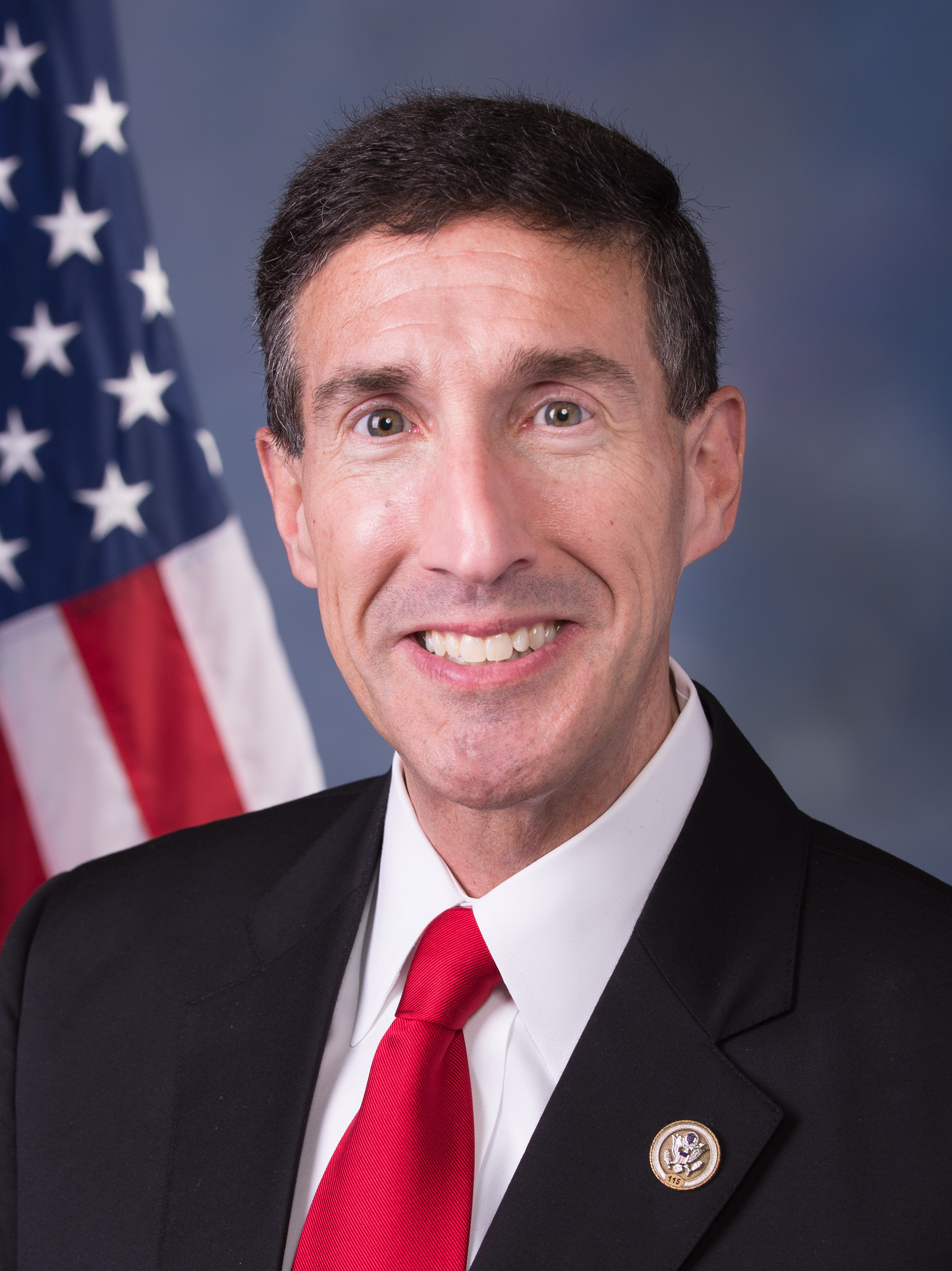

Nominee	David Kustoff	Erika Stotts Pearson
Party	Republican	Democratic
Popular vote	168,030	74,755
Percentage	67.7%	30.1%
- County results Kustoff: 50–60% 60–70% 70–80% Pearson: 50–60%
U.S. Representative before election
David Kustoff
Republican
Elected U.S. Representative
David Kustoff
Republican

The 8th district is located in western Tennessee, including the cities of Jackson, Paris and Union City, and the Memphis suburbs, such as Bartlett and Germantown. Incumbent Republican David Kustoff, who had represented the district since 2017, ran for re-election. He was elected with 69% of the vote in 2016. The district had a PVI of R+19.

=== Republican primary ===
==== Candidates ====
===== Nominee =====
- David Kustoff, incumbent U.S. representative

===== Eliminated in primary =====
- George Flinn Jr., physician and former electrical engineer

===== Withdrawn =====
- Colleen Owens (endorsed Flinn)

==== Results ====
Results by county: Kustoff: 40–50%; 50–60%; 60–70%; Flinn Jr.: 40–50%

Republican primary results
Party	Candidate	Votes	%
Republican	David Kustoff (incumbent)	57,695	56.0
Republican	George Flinn Jr.	40,869	39.7
Republican	Colleen Owens	4,452	4.3
Total votes		103,016	100.0

=== Democratic primary ===
==== Candidates ====
===== Nominee =====
- Erika Stotts Pearson, sports agent, financial adviser and television producer

===== Eliminated in primary =====
- John Boatner Jr.

==== Results ====
Democratic primary results
Party	Candidate	Votes	%
Democratic	Erika Stotts Pearson	16,973	50.3
Democratic	John Boatner Jr.	16,802	49.7
Total votes		33,775	100.0

=== General election ===
==== Predictions ====
Source	Ranking	As of
The Cook Political Report	Safe R	November 5, 2018
Inside Elections	Safe R	November 5, 2018
Sabato's Crystal Ball	Safe R	November 5, 2018
RCP	Safe R	November 5, 2018
Daily Kos	Safe R	November 5, 2018
538	Safe R	November 7, 2018
CNN	Safe R	October 31, 2018
Politico	Safe R	November 4, 2018

==== Results ====
Tennessee's 8th congressional district, 2018
Party	Candidate	Votes	%
Republican	David Kustoff (incumbent)	168,030	67.7
Democratic	Erika Pearson	74,755	30.1
Independent	James Hart	5,560	2.2
Total votes		248,345	100.0
Republican hold			

==== By county ====
County	David Kustoff Republican		Erika Pearson Democratic		Other votes	
County	%	#	%	#	%	#
Benton	51.35%	19	40.54%	15	8.11%	3
Carroll	74.64%	6,391	22.49%	1,926	2.87%	246
Crockett	74.32%	2,941	21.83%	864	3.84%	152
Dyer	78.10%	8,008	19.32%	1,981	2.57%	264
Fayette	71.94%	11,424	26.29%	4,175	1.77%	281
Gibson	72.94%	10,784	24.43%	3,612	2.63%	389
Haywood	44.55%	2,509	53.80%	3,030	1.65%	93
Henry	68.99%	6,811	23.56%	2,326	7.45%	736
Lake	69.68%	940	27.50%%	371	2.82%	38
Lauderdale	63.60%	3,794	33.91%	2,023	2.48%	148
Madison	57.18%	18,488	40.57%	13,119	2.25%	728
Obion	77.62%	7,316	20.12%	1,896	2.26%	213
Shelby	66.24%	67,898	32.16%	32,960	1.60%	1,640
Tipton	75.23%	13,533	22.71%	4,086	2.06%	370
Weakley	73.17%	7,174	24.18%	2,371	2.64%	259

== District 9 ==
2018 Tennessee's 9th congressional district election
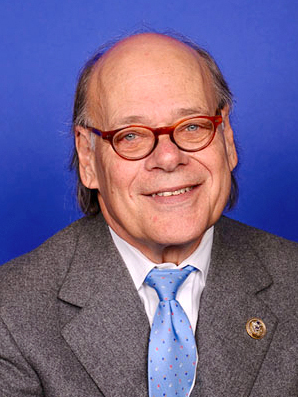

Nominee	Steve Cohen	Charlotte Bergmann
Party	Democratic	Republican
Popular vote	145,139	34,901
Percentage	80.0%	19.2%
- Cohen: 50–60% 60–70% 70–80% 80–90% 90%+ Bergmann: 50–60% 60–70% 70–80%
U.S. Representative before election
Steve Cohen
Democratic
Elected U.S. Representative
Steve Cohen
Democratic

The 9th district is based around Memphis and its surrounding suburbs including Millington. Incumbent Democrat Steve Cohen, who had represented the district since 2007, ran for re-election. He was re-elected with 79% of the vote in 2016. The district had a PVI of D+28.

=== Democratic primary ===
==== Candidates ====
===== Nominee =====
- Steve Cohen, incumbent U.S. representative

===== Eliminated in primary =====
- Isaac Richmond, founder of the Commission on Religion and Racism and candidate for this seat in 2014
- Kasandra Smith

===== Withdrawn =====
- M. LaTroy Williams

==== Results ====
Democratic primary results
Party	Candidate	Votes	%
Democratic	Steve Cohen (incumbent)	66,975	91.0
Democratic	Kasandra Smith	4,698	6.4
Democratic	Isaac Richmond	1,951	2.6
Total votes		73,319	100.0

=== Republican primary ===
==== Candidates ====
===== Nominee =====
- Charlotte Bergmann, business manager, nominee of this seat in 2014 and candidate in 2012

==== Results ====
Republican primary results
Party	Candidate	Votes	%
Republican	Charlotte Bergmann	17,850	100.0
Total votes		17,850	100.0

=== General election ===
==== Predictions ====
Source	Ranking	As of
The Cook Political Report	Safe D	November 5, 2018
Inside Elections	Safe D	November 5, 2018
Sabato's Crystal Ball	Safe D	November 5, 2018
RCP	Safe D	November 5, 2018
Daily Kos	Safe D	November 5, 2018
538	Safe D	November 7, 2018
CNN	Safe D	October 31, 2018
Politico	Safe D	November 4, 2018

==== Results ====
Tennessee's 9th congressional district, 2018
Party	Candidate	Votes	%
Democratic	Steve Cohen (incumbent)	145,139	79.98%
Republican	Charlotte Bergmann	34,901	19.23%
Independent	Leo AwGoWhat	1,436	0.79%
Total votes		181,476	100.00%
Democratic hold			

== See also ==
- 2018 Tennessee elections
- 2018 United States elections
