= Mark Green (Tennessee politician) =

American politician (born 1964)

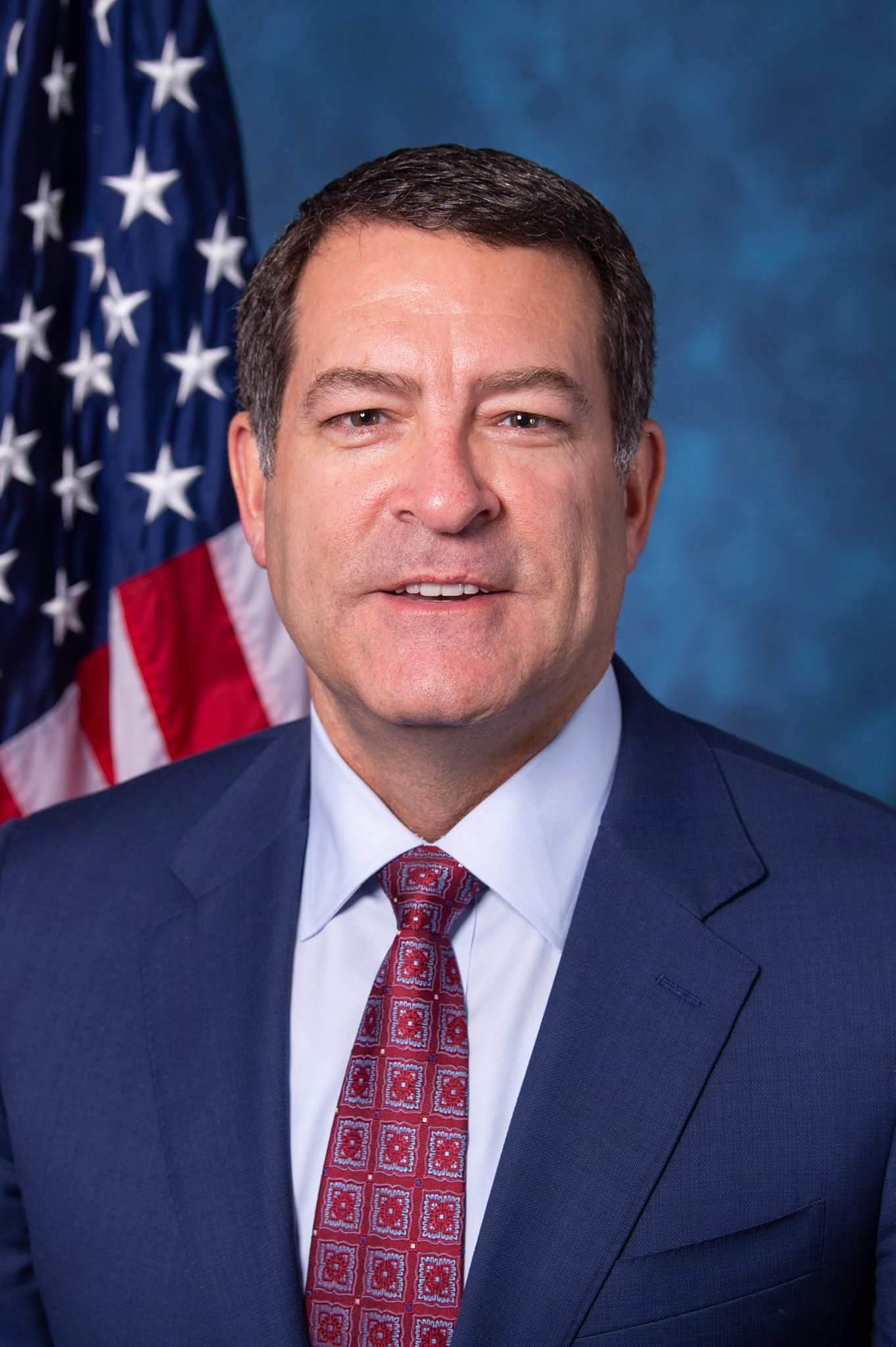
- Official portrait, 2019

Chair of the House Homeland Security Committee
- In office January 9, 2023 – July 20, 2025
- Preceded by: Bennie Thompson
- Succeeded by: Andrew Garbarino

Member of the U.S. House of Representatives from Tennessee's 7th district
- In office January 3, 2019 – July 20, 2025
- Preceded by: Marsha Blackburn
- Succeeded by: Matt Van Epps

Member of the Tennessee Senate from the 22nd district
- In office January 8, 2013 – November 1, 2018
- Preceded by: Tim Barnes
- Succeeded by: Rosalind Kurita

Personal details
- Born: Mark Edward Green; November 8, 1964 (age 61) Jacksonville, Florida, U.S.
- Party: Republican
- Spouse: Camilla Guenther (m. 1989; sep. 2024)
- Children: 2
- Education: United States Military Academy (BS); University of Southern California (MA); Wright State University (MD)

Military service
- Allegiance: United States
- Branch/service: United States Army
- Years of service: 1986–2006
- Rank: Major
- Battles/wars: Afghanistan War; Iraq War; Operation Red Dawn
- Awards: Bronze Star; Meritorious Service Medal; Army Commendation Medal; Army Achievement Medal; Air Medal with valor (2); Combat Medical Badge; Air Assault Badge; Flight Surgeon Badge; Ranger Tab; Senior Parachutist Badge
- Green's voice Green on the 2023 Nashville school shooting. Recorded March 29, 2023

Mark Edward Green (born November 8, 1964) is an American politician, physician, and retired U.S. Army surgeon who served as the U.S. representative for Tennessee's 7th congressional district from 2019 until his resignation in 2025. A member of the Republican Party, Green chaired the Committee on Homeland Security from 2023 to 2025. Before his election to Congress, he served in the Tennessee Senate, representing the 22nd district from 2013 to 2018.

After graduating from West Point, Green was an infantry officer. He then graduated from Boonshoft School of Medicine at Wright State University and became a flight surgeon, serving tours of duty in the War in Afghanistan and Iraq War. He wrote a book about his experience in Operation Red Dawn, in which Saddam Hussein was captured. After retiring from the military in 2006, Green became the CEO of a hospital emergency department staffing company.

Green first entered state politics in 2012 by defeating the Democratic incumbent Tim Barnes for a seat in the Tennessee Senate. In 2017, President Donald Trump nominated Green to serve as the United States secretary of the Army, but when comments Green had made about the LGBT community were revealed, he withdrew his nomination. When U.S. representative Marsha Blackburn announced her candidacy for the United States Senate in 2018, Green announced his candidacy to succeed her, and was elected in November of that year. He was re-elected in 2020 and 2022. In October 2023, he was a candidate for Speaker of the House of Representatives, but withdrew from the race on October 24.

On June 9, 2025, Green announced that he would be resigning after the passage of the One Big Beautiful Bill Act to take a job in the private sector. His last day in office was on July 20, 2025.

== Military career ==
In 1986, Green graduated from the United States Military Academy, where he earned a Bachelor of Science in quantitative business management. In 1987 he earned a master's degree in systems management from the University of Southern California. From 1987 to 1990, Green served as an infantry officer in the United States Army. His first duty assignment after graduation from the US Army Ranger School was with the 194th Armored Brigade at Fort Knox. There he served as a rifle platoon leader, scout platoon leader, and battalion adjutant for an infantry battalion. After the Infantry Officer's Advance Course, then-Captain Green served with the 82nd Airborne Division as an airborne battalion supply officer and rifle company commander.

Following a traumatic event in which a team of surgeons and critical care doctors saved his father's life, Green requested that the Army send him to medical school. He attended the Boonshoft School of Medicine at Wright State University, graduating with a Doctor of Medicine in 1999. He did his residency in emergency medicine at Fort Hood, Texas. After his residency, Green was selected to serve as the flight surgeon for the 160th Special Operations Aviation Regiment.

As a special operations flight surgeon, Green served a tour of duty in the Afghanistan War and two tours of duty in the Iraq War. He was the special operations flight surgeon during Operation Red Dawn, the military operation that captured Saddam Hussein. Green interrogated Hussein for six hours. After his military service, he authored a book, A Night With Saddam, detailing the capture and interrogation of Hussein and his service with the Army's elite aviation unit. Green was honorably discharged from the Army in 2006.

For his service, Green was awarded the Bronze Star, the Meritorious Service Medal with two oak leaf clusters, the Army Commendation Medal with two oak leaf clusters, the Achievement Medal with three oak leaf clusters, the Air Medal with the V Device for valor under heavy enemy fire while rescuing British Special Operations forces wounded near Fallujah, and the Combat Medical Badge, among other awards. He also earned the Air Assault Badge and the Flight Surgeon Badge during his service.

== Civilian career ==
Green founded and was chief executive officer of Align MD, a hospital emergency department management staffing company. Align MD provides staffing to emergency departments and hospital services in 50 hospitals in 10 states. Green also founded Two Rivers Medical Foundation, which provides health care to underserved populations worldwide via medical mission trips, and operates a free medical clinic in his hometown and in Memphis, Tennessee.

Green was on the boards of several for-profit companies, including American Physician Partners, Align MD, and Rural Physician Partners. Green is also a board member of the Middle Tennessee Boy Scouts of America. He has been on the advisory board of the political organization Latinos for Tennessee since 2015.

In 2015, Williamson College awarded Green an honorary doctorate.

Following his resignation from the Congress in 2025, Green cofounded Prosimos, a corporation focused on increasing trade and economic development between the United States and Guyana.

== Political career ==
=== Tennessee State Senate ===
Green was first elected to the Tennessee Senate in 2012, defeating Democratic incumbent Tim Barnes. He was rumored to be considering a challenge to Lamar Alexander in the 2014 U.S. Senate election, but declined to do so.

Green is most noteworthy for his legislation ending Tennessee's Hall Income Tax, only the second time in US history a state has repealed an income tax. He also co-sponsored a bill that eliminated the statute of limitations on rape cases where the DNA profile of the suspect is known. Green received awards recognizing his many laws protecting veterans and small businesses. He led the charge in Tennessee for automated technology in auto manufacturing, speaking at national conferences on the topic.

In 2015, Green proposed a pilot program to test an innovative solution to health care. The idea was to give Medicaid patients a reduced amount of health care dollars on a swipe card, giving them choice and control. The incentive is that any dollars not spent go to the patient as an addition to their earned income check. SJR 88 passed and was signed by the governor. The request for a waiver to test the program is at CMS for approval.

Green won the 2016 Republican primary 84% to 16% over Lori Smith of Clarksville, Tennessee. In the general election, he defeated Democratic nominee David Cutting, 67% to 33%.

=== Nomination as U.S. Army Secretary ===
In April 2017, President Donald Trump nominated Green for United States Secretary of the Army. Green was Trump's second nominee for this position after his first nominee, Vincent Viola, withdrew from consideration.

Green drew some opposition based on public comments about transgender people. At a September 2016 Tea Party gathering in Chattanooga, Tennessee, Green said, "If you polled the psychiatrists, they're going to tell you that transgender is a disease." He also supported a state law that limited access to public restrooms for transgender people to those matching their legal sex, not their gender identity, and told internet radio talk show host CJ Porter that he viewed his support of that law as part of his duty as a state senator to "crush evil".

Green also said that if school districts "want to have a bathroom that's separate for all of the, you know, guys or gals with question marks" but were concerned the "AFL-CIO is going to sue you, well, I got your back." It is assumed Green meant the American Civil Liberties Union (ACLU), not the American Federation of Labor and Congress of Industrial Organizations (AFL–CIO). Green also said that he would "not tolerate" students learning about Muslim beliefs and practices. Green added later that he doesn't "think we should teach the Lord's Prayer" in schools either. In a call for separation of church and state, he said, "Leave that to the churches, the synagogues, and the mosques."

Green withdrew his nomination on May 5, 2017.

=== 2018 Tennessee gubernatorial election ===
On January 4, 2017, Green filed paperwork to run for governor in the 2018 gubernatorial election. But in late 2017, when 7th District Representative Marsha Blackburn announced her candidacy for the United States Senate, Green announced he was running for the open congressional seat. His state senate district included almost all of the northeastern part of the congressional district.

== U.S. House of Representatives ==
=== Elections ===
==== 2018 ====
Green became the Republican nominee for the 2018 U.S. House of Representatives election in Tennessee's 7th congressional district after running unopposed for the nomination. His State Senate district included much of the northern part of the congressional district. Green won the general election in November and took office in January 2019.

==== 2020 ====
In the 2020 Republican primary, Green was unopposed. On November 3, he defeated Democratic nominee Kiran Sreepada and two independents with 69.9% of the vote.

==== 2022 ====
In the 2022 Republican primary, Green was unopposed. On November 8, he defeated Democratic nominee Odessa Kelly with 60.0% of the vote.

==== 2024 ====
In the 2024 Republican primary, Green was unopposed. On election day, he defeated Democratic nominee Megan Barry with 59.5% of the vote.

=== Tenure ===
After incumbent U.S. Senator Lamar Alexander announced he would not seek reelection in 2020, Green was considered a likely candidate for the seat. But on July 11, 2019, he announced that he would not be a candidate.

In late February 2021, Green and a dozen other Republican House members skipped votes and enlisted others to vote for them, citing the ongoing COVID-19 pandemic. But he and the other members were actually attending the Conservative Political Action Conference, which was held at the same time as their slated absences. In response, the Campaign for Accountability, an ethics watchdog group, filed a complaint with the House Committee on Ethics and requested an investigation into Green and the other lawmakers.

In August 2022, Business Insider reported that Green had violated the Stop Trading on Congressional Knowledge (STOCK) Act of 2012, a federal transparency and conflict-of-interest law, by failing to properly disclose a purchase of stock in NGL Energy Partners worth between $100,000 and $250,000. In a closed-door GOP meeting in 2024, Green called Secretary of Homeland Security Alejandro Mayorkas "a reptile with no balls."

On February 14, 2024, Green announced that he would not run for re-election, but he reversed this decision on February 29. On July 29, 2024, Green was announced as one of seven Republican members of a bipartisan task force investigating the attempted assassination of Donald Trump.

On June 9, 2025, Green announced his intent to resign from Congress following the passage of the One Big Beautiful Bill Act due to a private sector employment opportunity "too exciting to pass up". However, he said he will remain in Congress until "the House votes once again on the reconciliation package", setting a potentially unprecedented case of conflict of interest of being employed by a private entity while voting in Congress. On July 4, 2025 it was announced that he would resign on July 20. The 7th district special election to elect his replacement, on December 2, 2025, was won by Republican Matt Van Epps.

=== Committee assignments ===
- Committee on Homeland Security (Chairman)
- Committee on Foreign Affairs
  - Subcommittee on Indo-Pacific
  - Subcommittee on Western Hemisphere

=== Caucus memberships ===
- Freedom Caucus
- Republican Study Committee
- Special Operations Forces Caucus
- GOP Doctor's Caucus
- Pro-Life Caucus
- Prayer Caucus
- Military Family Caucus
- Military Veterans Caucus
- Congressional Army Caucus
- Congressional Taiwan Caucus
- House Republican Israel Caucus
- Songwriters Caucus
- Values Action Team
- Congressional Recording Arts and Sciences Caucus

== Political positions ==
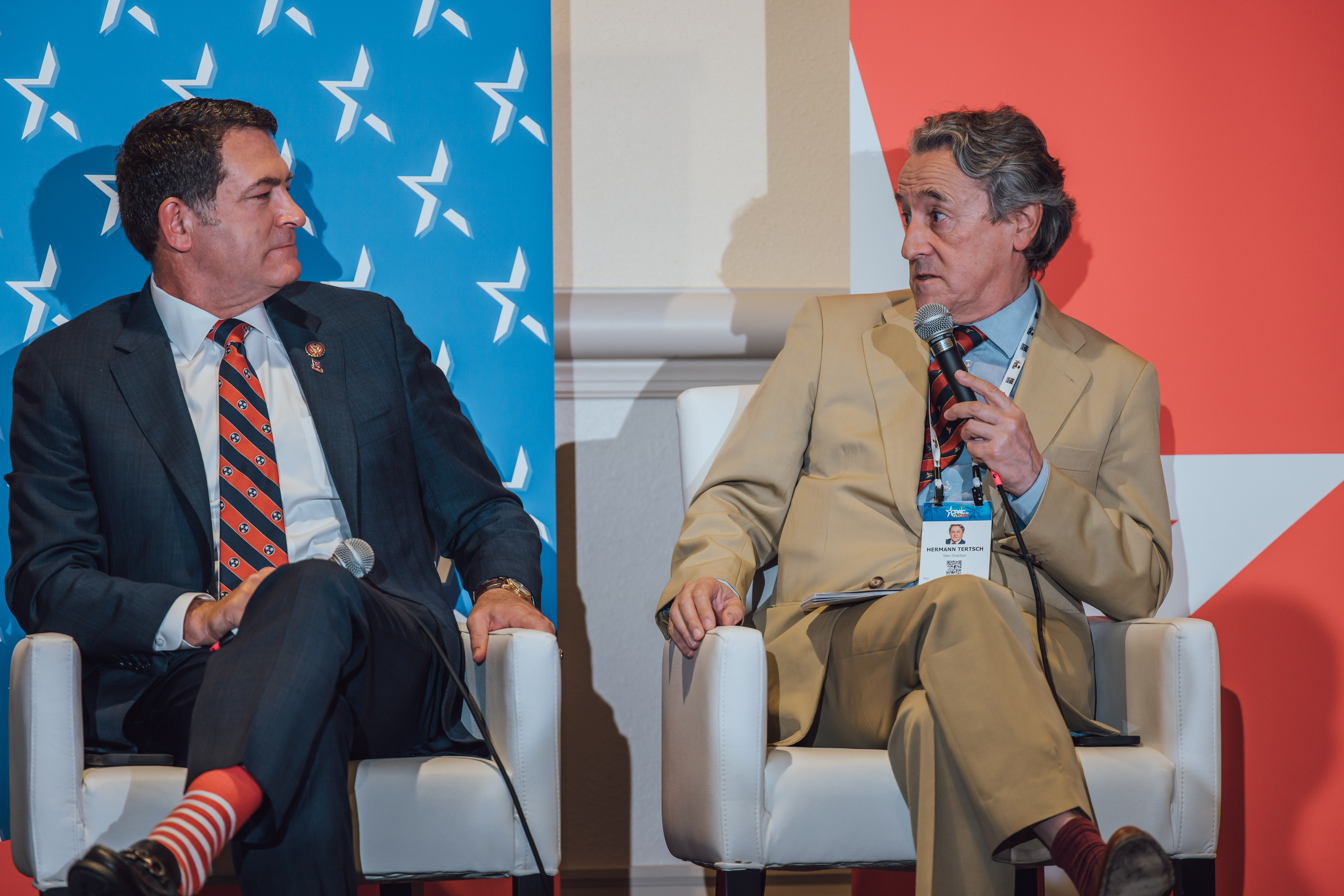
Green and Hermann Tertsch at CPAC 2022

=== Abortion ===
Green opposes abortion. In a 2019 op-ed, he wrote, "modern science has revealed that mother and baby are, in fact, two separate persons—long before the baby is born" and argued that "a child becomes a child at conception".

=== Climate change ===
Green has expressed skepticism about the scientific consensus on climate change. During a town hall meeting, he acknowledged that carbon dioxide levels are increasing but questioned whether they are causing global warming. He stated, "I'm not yet convinced that the science is proving that we're warming, but I am very convinced that we have aerial fertilization going on, and if we continue to cut trees in Brazil and other places, we're going to hurt ourselves, and then we will have warming." He also highlighted concerns about deforestation's role in climate change.

=== Creationism ===
Green rejects the theory of evolution, which is consensus in biology; in a 2015 lecture he used creationist reasoning such as "irreducible complexity".

=== 2020 election ===
In December 2019, Green voted against the articles of impeachment in the first impeachment of Donald Trump.

In December 2020, Green was one of 126 Republican members of the House of Representatives to sign an amicus brief in support of Texas v. Pennsylvania, a lawsuit filed at the United States Supreme Court contesting the results of the 2020 presidential election, in which Joe Biden prevailed over incumbent Donald Trump. The Supreme Court declined to hear the case on the basis that Texas lacked standing under Article III of the Constitution to challenge the results of an election held by another state.

=== Vaccines ===
In 2018, as a congressman-elect, Green said at a constituent meeting, "there is some concern that the rise in autism is the result of the preservatives that are in our vaccines", a claim that has been repeatedly debunked by scientific studies and rejected by medical organizations such as the American Academy of Pediatrics.

=== Transgender people ===
Green suggested military should not allow transgender troops due to "immorality", and claimed without evidence that physicians agree that "transgenderism" is a "disease".

=== Welfare ===
Green has suggested that welfare interrupts "the opportunity for people to come to a saving knowledge of who God is", and Americans should rely on God instead of governmental assistance.

=== 2024 Republican primary ===
Green was named as part of the Trump campaign's Tennessee leadership team.

=== Israel-Palestine conflict ===
Green voted to support Israel following the October 7 attacks.

== Personal life ==
Green and his wife, Camie, have two children. For most of his tenure in the state senate, he lived in Ashland City, Cheatham County, south of Clarksville and west of Nashville. He has since moved to Clarksville.

In August 2024, Green filed for divorce from his wife of nearly 36 years, citing irreconcilable differences. In a text message circulated among House Republicans, his wife later accused him of having an affair with a younger woman working as a political reporter for Axios. However, she later admitted to misidentifying the woman after receiving a cease and desist letter from the company. The actual woman involved anonymously confirmed the affair to Politico in an effort to clear the reporter's name.

== Electoral history ==
Mark Green electoral history

=== Tennessee State Senate ===
Tennessee's 22nd State Senate district election, 2012
Primary election
Party	Candidate	Votes	%
Republican	Mark Green	4,849	100.00%
Total votes		4,849	100.00%
General election
Republican	Mark Green	31,963	53.08%
Democratic	Tim Barnes (incumbent)	28,257	46.92%
Total votes		60,220	100.00%
Republican gain from Democratic			

Tennessee's 22nd State Senate district election, 2016
Primary election
Party	Candidate	Votes	%
Republican	Mark Green (incumbent)	6,183	84.17%
Republican	Lori L. Smith	1,163	15.83%
Total votes		7,346	100.00%
General election
Republican	Mark Green (incumbent)	41,497	67.04%
Democratic	David L. Cutting	20,406	32.96%
Total votes		61,903	100.00%
Republican hold			

=== U.S. House ===
Tennessee's 7th congressional district election, 2018
Primary election
Party	Candidate	Votes	%
Republican	Mark Green	83,314	100.00%
Total votes		83,314	100.00%
General election
Republican	Mark Green	170,071	66.86%
Democratic	Justin Kanew	81,661	32.10%
Independent	Lenny Ladner	1,582	0.62%
Independent	Brent Legendre	1,070	0.42%
Total votes		254,384	100.00%
Republican hold			

Tennessee's 7th congressional district election, 2020
Primary election
Party	Candidate	Votes	%
Republican	Mark Green (incumbent)	73,540	100.00%
Total votes		73,540	100.00%
General election
Republican	Mark Green (incumbent)	245,188	69.93%
Democratic	Kiran Sreepada	95,839	27.33%
Independent	Ronald Brown	7,603	2.17%
Independent	Scott Vieira	2,005	0.57%
Total votes		350,635	100.00%
Republican hold			

Tennessee's 7th congressional district election, 2022
Primary election
Party	Candidate	Votes	%
Republican	Mark Green (incumbent)	48,968	100.00%
Total votes		48,968	100.00%
General election
Republican	Mark Green (incumbent)	108,421	59.96%
Democratic	Odessa Kelly	68,973	38.14%
Independent	Steven J. Hooper	3,428	1.90%
Total votes		180,822	100.0%
Republican hold			

Tennessee's 7th congressional district election, 2024
Primary election
Party	Candidate	Votes	%
Republican	Mark Green (incumbent)	31,871	100.00%
Total votes		31,871	100.00%
General election
Republican	Mark Green (incumbent)	191,992	59.50%
Democratic	Megan Barry	122,764	38.05%
Independent	Shaun Greene	7,900	2.45%
Total votes		322,656	100.00%
Republican hold			

U.S. House of Representatives
Preceded by Marsha Blackburn	Member of the U.S. House of Representatives from Tennessee's 7th congressional district 2019–2025	Succeeded by Matt Van Epps
Preceded by Bennie Thompson	Chair of the House Homeland Security Committee; 2023–2025	Succeeded by Andrew Garbarino
U.S. order of precedence (ceremonial)
Preceded by Stephen Fincher as Former U.S. Representative	Order of precedence of the United States as Former U.S. Representative	Succeeded by Betty Sutton as Former U.S. Representative
