= Justin Kanew =

American writer, producer, and activist

- Born: June 22, 1979 (age 47); New York City, NY United States
- Occupations: Screenwriter, film producer, progressive political activist
- Known for: The Amazing Race
- Partner: Nicole Kanew
- Children: 2 Kaia Lisa, Koa
- Parent: Jeff Kanew

Justin Kanew is an American writer, film producer, and political activist known for his appearances on The Amazing Race and his involvement in politics in Tennessee. He gained attention for his congressional run in Tennessee's 7th District and his role as the founder of the progressive media outlet The Tennessee Holler.

== Entertainment career ==
Justin Kanew has worked in the entertainment industry as a writer and film producer. His credits include Coming 2 America (2021), Welcome to the Jungle (2013) and The Man Without a Face (1993). He participated in the 15th season of The Amazing Race in 2009, alongside Zev Glassenberg. The duo returned for the 18th season, The Amazing Race: Unfinished Business.

After working in Los Angeles for several years, Kanew relocated to Franklin, Tennessee, with his family. This move marked the beginning of his transition from entertainment to political activism.

== Political career and activism ==
Kanew announced his candidacy for the U.S. House of Representatives in Tennessee's 7th District in 2017. He ran as a Democrat, motivated by concerns about the direction of the country under then-President Donald Trump. Despite being a political newcomer and facing a heavily Republican district, Kanew campaigned on issues such as healthcare, education, and criminal justice reform. He lost the race to Republican Mark Green.

In addition to his congressional run, Kanew became known for his outspoken activism, particularly through his media platform, The Tennessee Holler. The outlet is known for its progressive stance and its critical coverage of Tennessee's Republican leadership. Kanew's activism includes viral moments, such as his passionate defense of mask mandates during a school board meeting in Williamson County, Tennessee, amid the COVID-19 pandemic.

== Personal life ==
Kanew was born and raised in New York City and has publicly identified as Jewish.The son of Hollywood director Jeff Kanew, he worked in Los Angeles as a screenwriter and film producer before relocating his family to Tennessee, where he founded the progressive media outlet the Tennessee Holler and became active in state politics. Justin Kanew is married to Nicole Kanew, and they have two children. The family lives in College Grove, Tennessee.

In April 2023, Kanew's home was targeted in a shooting while his family was asleep. The incident drew significant attention, with many speculating that the attack was politically motivated due to his outspoken activism. The incident remains under investigation.
