= Frank Jude Boccio =

American Buddhist teacher

- Born: 1956 (age 69–70)
- Education: University of Sunderland
- Occupations: Teacher; author
- Known for: Originator of Mindfulness Yoga; Author of Mindfulness Yoga: The Awakened Union of Breath, Body and Mind
- Children: 2

Frank Jude Boccio (born 1956) is a teacher and the originator of Mindfulness Yoga as he distinguishes his approach, based upon the Buddha's teaching of satipatthana, from Mindful Yoga, which simply emphasizes doing postures mindfully. He explains the difference in his blog where he writes "In mindful yoga, one is practicing asana mindfully; in Mindfulness Yoga one is practicing mindfulness in the posture." He is known both for his teaching in centres across America, and for his 2004 book Mindfulness Yoga: The Awakened Union of Breath, Body and Mind, which describes a practice that combines yoga as exercise and Buddhist meditational practice.

== Life ==
=== Education and training ===
Frank Jude Boccio began practising Buddhism in New York at the age of 18. He read Buddhist Studies at the University of Sunderland, obtaining a graduate-level diploma but deciding not to write a thesis and hence obtain an M.A. In 1989, he began a period of study under Lyn Fine and Patricia Hunt-Perry in the tradition of Thich Nhat Hanh; in 1997 he was ordained into the Tiep Hien order. He then studied under Samu Sunim, who ordained him as a dharma teacher in 2007.

He studied a variety of styles of modern yoga including Iyengar, Anusara, Ashtanga, Integral and Kundalini. He is a certified preventive and rehabilitative yoga teacher and therapist via the Bateman Institute. Georg Feuerstein has certified him for the Yoga Research and Education Center's 750-hour teacher training program.

=== Career ===
Boccio founded the Empty Mountain Sangha and the peer-led Tucson Mindfulness Practice Community. He teaches, lectures, and gives workshops and retreats in the Americas and Asia on Mindfulness Yoga integrating modern yoga and Buddhist vipassana mindfulness, at centres including Kripalu.

He has written articles for magazines including Tricycle, Yoga Journal, Shambhala Sun, Spring Wind, Namaskar, Elephant Journal, and Experience Life. He is the author of the 2004 book Mindfulness Yoga: The Awakened Union of Breath, Body and Mind which integrates Buddhism's Four Foundations of Mindfulness (Satipatthana) with the practice of yoga asanas, and chapters in various anthologies on the connection of yoga and Buddhism.

== Reception ==
=== Mindfulness Yoga ===
Phil Catalfo, reviewing Mindfulness Yoga for Yoga Journal, wrote that it was not surprising that many yoga practitioners also studied Buddhist practice, as the traditions have common roots, but that Boccio's was the first "successful book-length discourse" that properly integrated the practices. In Catalfo's view, Boccio shows that Buddhist practice "is itself a form of yoga, presenting a meditational approach to asana practice". He writes that the book consists mainly of four sequences, each of some dozens of "familiar poses": "Body as Body"; "Feelings as Feelings"; "Mindfully Aware"; and "Dharmas in the Dharmas", the headings intentionally reflecting the Anapanasati Sutta which combines mindful breathing with the direction of the attention to these four areas.

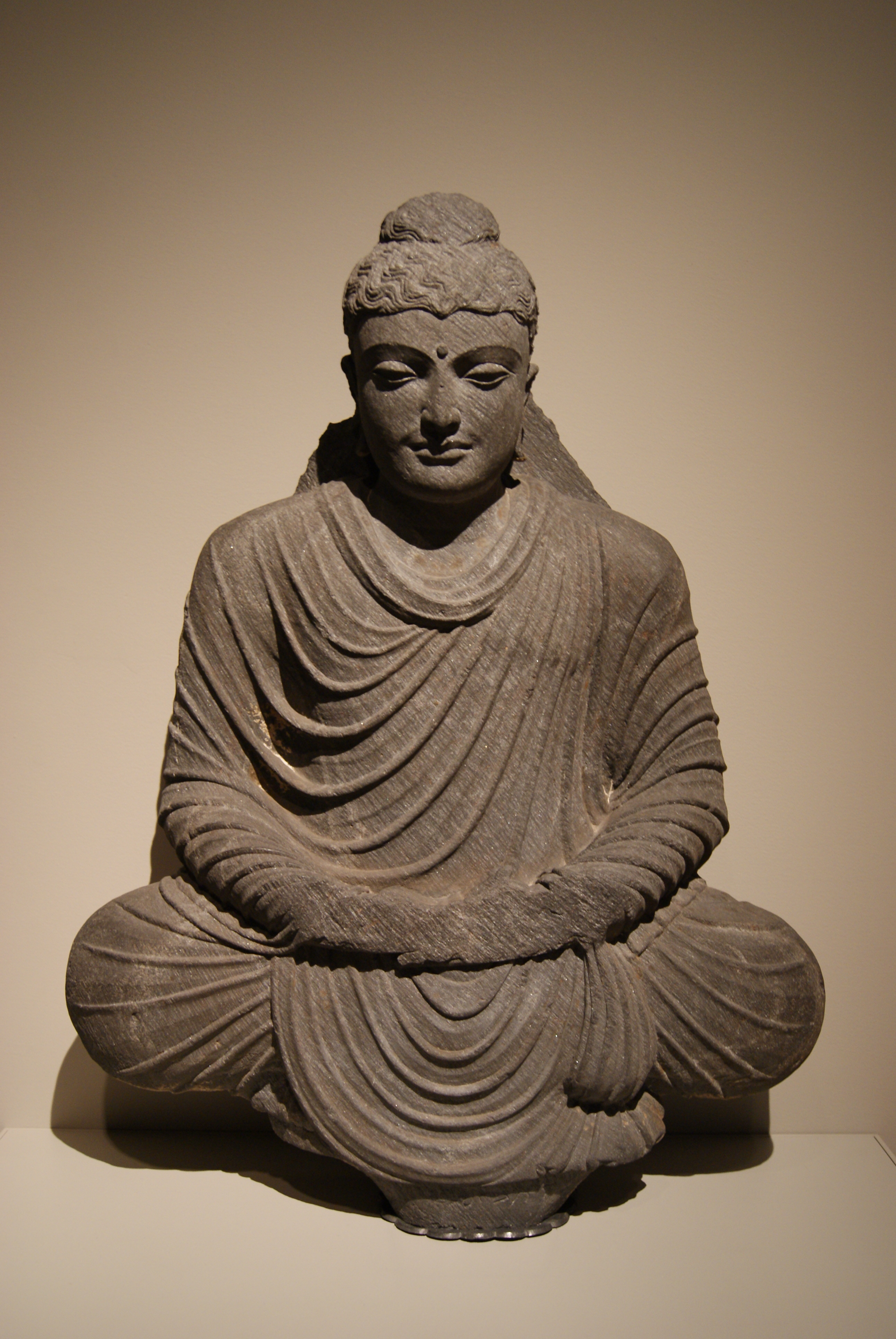
Buddha in anapanasati, mindfulness meditation. 3rd century, Kushan Empire

The yoga and meditation teacher and author Anne Cushman, reviewing the book for Tricycle: The Buddhist Review, noted that "Sneaking Hatha Yoga into a Buddhist practice used to be a guilty pleasure, like nibbling a secret stash of chocolate during a meditation retreat." Obstacles to combining them included Buddhist masters' warnings that hatha yoga's focus on the body encouraged a dangerous obsession with something that inevitably decayed, while modern yoga's energetic workouts did not look like serious spiritual practice. However, in the 21st century, hatha yoga is, she writes, regularly forming "an integral part of the schedule at Vipassana, Zen, and Tibetan Buddhist retreats". Cushman writes that Boccio "solidly locates hatha yoga practice in Buddhist history and philosophy, emphasizing the mindfulness techniques laid out in the Anapanasati Sutta and Satipatthana Sutta". She calls the book "the most erudite" and "the most philosophically comprehensive" of the three works on the topic that she reviews, tracing the origins of yoga to the life story of the Buddha, "himself a wandering yogi" in India. The book then provides a "dense but readable summary" of the core teachings of Buddhism and Patanjali's Yoga Sutras, before offering four complete, illustrated, meditational asana sequences, paying attention both to the physical postures and to their lessons "about the deepest truths in our lives".

The Kripalu Center for Yoga & Health called Boccio's book "the first to apply the Buddha's mindfulness meditation teachings to asana practice".

Publishers Weekly described the thesis of Mindfulness Yoga as "both novel and logical", since Buddhism "grew from Hindu-yoga roots", while modern yoga, especially the American kind, needed "greater appreciation of its spiritual significance." The review noted Boccio's debt to the Vietnamese Zen monk Thich Nhat Hanh (who wrote the Foreword). It found the four sequences of asanas in the book somewhat hard to follow, making the book more suitable for established practitioners.

In 2008, Nora Isaacs noted in Yoga Journal that Boccio and others such as Janice Gates, Cyndi Lee, Phillip Moffitt, and Sarah Powers, had "each, independently, discovered the benefits of merging mindfulness with asana", leading to "something we might call 'mindful yoga'."

== Personal life ==
Boccio has two daughters, one 36 years older than the other, and lives in Tucson, Arizona.

== Works ==
- Boccio, Frank (2004). Mindfulness Yoga : the awakened union of breath, body and mind. Wisdom Publications. ISBN 978-0-86171-335-6. OCLC 53483563.
