= Lucy's =

Lucy's may refer to:

- Lucy's Eagle Ironworks, or Lucy's, on the Oxford Canal in Jericho, Oxford, England
- Lucy's (bar), a dive bar in the East Village neighborhood of Manhattan, New York City
- Lucy's Record Shop, a record store and music venue in Nashville, Tennessee

== See also ==
- Lucy (disambiguation)
