= Kripalvananda =

Yogi (1913–1981)

- Born: January 29, 1913
- Died: December 29, 1981 (aged 68)
- Other names: Bapuji
- Occupations: Swami, yogi
- Known for: Kripalu Center

Kripalvananda (January 13, 1913 – December 29, 1981), also known as Swami Sri Kripalvanand or Bapuji, was a renowned master of kundalini yoga and the namesake of the Kripalu Center, Kripalu Yoga style and Kripalvananda Yoga Institute, as well as a significant influence on Kriya Yoga in the United States.

== Life ==
Kripalvananda was born in 1913 in Dabhoi, Gujarat, India.

He worked as a music teacher in Ahmedabad between 1935 and 1940, playing the tamboura and harmonium, and becoming a Master of Music at the same time.

In 1981 his health worsened and he decided to go back to India. He made a farewell speech to his American disciples on September 27, and he died on December 29. His shrine is in Malav, Gujarat.

== Dadaji ==
After his training by guru Dadaji (also known as Pranavandji or Bhagwan Lakulish), he renounced his worldly attachments and traveled throughout western India as a lecturer, writer, and teacher. Among other his students in 1947 were two prominent yogis, brothers, Amrit Desai and Shanti Desai, the first is creator of Kripalu Yoga.

He is reputed to have met Dadaji in Bombay circa 1932, when Dadaji told him he was occupying the body of a deceased sadhu for 18 months, during which time he could initiate Kripalvananda into the teachings of kundalini yoga. The two men traveled together for 15 months until Dadaji vanished. Several years later, in 1942, Kripalvananda took sannyasa vows and became a recognized kundalini yoga master.

Dadaji is said to have reappeared to Kripalvananda briefly in 1950, then in the body of a 19-year-old saint. In 1955, Kripalvananda encountered a statue of Lord Lakulisha, the 28th incarnation of Shiva, and recognized Lakulisha's face as the face of Dadaji. It is said that the advanced teachings of kundalini yoga were revealed to him at that instant.

== Disciples ==
Kripalvananda had 5 disciples who took vows of renunciation: Swami Rajarshi Muni, who maintains Bapuji's ashram in Gujarat, India, LIFE Mission; Swami Vinit Muni who died in 1995; Swami Asutosh Muni who maintains the mahasamadhi of Kripalvananda in Malav, India, and Yogeshwar Muni who was given the highest yogic teachings and commissioned by Kripalvananda to teach kundalini yoga in the West; he died in 2007. Kripalvananda's householder disciple, Amrit Desai, brought his own version of yoga to the West in the 1960s and created the Kripalu Yoga Center in his honour. And Amrit Desai's brother, Shanti Desai, who established in 1974 in the US the Shanti Yoga Institute.

Kripalvananda, along with his disciple Swami Vinit Muni, spent four years from 1977 to 1981 at Desai's yoga centers in the United States, primarily at the Kripalu Yoga Ashram in Sumneytown, Pennsylvania and at Kayavarohana West in 1977 and 1978 at Yogeshwar Muni's Ashram in St. Helena, California. While in the US, he performed intense sadhana for 10 hours daily. In 1981, as his health was failing, he returned to India, where he died on December 29, 1981.

Kripalvananda's disciple, Rajarshi Muni continues Kripalvanada's work as head of LIFE Mission and runs the Lakulish Yoga University in Gujarat, India, an accredited private yoga university which teaches yoga principles and methods and which grants degrees and certificates in yoga. LIFE Mission also has an ashram and retreat center in the United States. Lakulish Yoga and Health Retreat in Mebane, North Carolina, United States, is run by Swami Satyanand, a disciple of Swami Rajarshi Muni and offers yoga classes, workshops and seminars in the kundalini yoga tradition.
