= Stephen Cope =

Psychotherapist, Kripalu Yoga teacher, and author

Stephen Cope is a psychotherapist, Kripalu Yoga teacher, and author of several books on yoga and meditation. He is the founder of the Kripalu Institute for Extraordinary Living.

== Early life ==
Stephen Cope was brought up in Wooster, Ohio in the 1950s and 1960s; he learnt to play the piano from an early age. His father was an academic historian and dean of Wooster College. He was educated at Amherst College, where he became a Presbyterian (of his childhood he is reported to have been reared as a Protestant) and subsequently a Quaker. His working life began as a professional dancer with Minnesota Dance Theatre. He then became a pianist at the Boston Conservatory of Music, playing as an accompanist for its dance teaching. He trained as a priest at Episcopal Divinity School, Boston, in 1974, but was not ordained as he was openly homosexual. He took a master's degree in social work, and a graduate course in psychotherapy at Boston University, and had a career as a psychotherapist in Boston for 12 years.

== Yoga and meditation ==
He began practising Buddhist meditation while at Boston University. In 1987, he "fell in love with yoga" when he went on a yoga retreat at Kripalu, where the center's founder and guru, Amrit Desai, happened to be present. Cope states that he did not believe in the guru-disciple relationship, but he played along, and Desai "actually zapped me" with Shakti, something Cope had never heard of; Cope spent the next 3 days in a blissful state. He promptly took up asana practice; he then took a sabbatical to get his ideas on the relationship of yoga and meditation together; and less than a year later closed his psychotherapy practice to teach yoga at Kripalu.

== Career ==
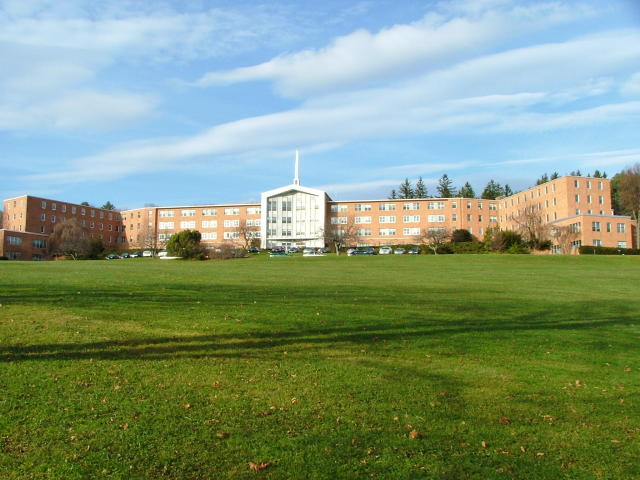
The Kripalu Center in Massachusetts, formerly a Jesuit seminary

Cope became a Kripalu Yoga teacher, and author of several books on yoga and meditation including the bestselling Yoga and the Quest for the True Self. In 1993 he organised a conference at Kripalu on psychotherapy and spirituality. A panel of experts including Marion Woodman and Daniel Goleman spoke on exposing the shadow side of the personality, leading Desai to admit that he too had such a "shadow"; the following year, Desai's sexual contact with female resident disciples became public, and Desai was forced to leave Kripalu. This led Cope to reflect that the Western world's version of yoga—asanas, pranayama, meditation—had lost the surrounding context of an ethical lifestyle (classical yoga's yamas and niyamas) that were needed to support those practices.

Cope is the founder of the Kripalu Institute for Extraordinary Living and is a scholar-in-residence at Kripalu; he has given numerous training courses there.

In 2008, Cope was identified by Nora Isaacs, writing in Yoga Journal, as one of the people who had "each, independently, discovered the benefits of merging mindfulness with asana", leading to "something we might call 'mindful yoga'."

== Reception ==
Yog Sundari were "touched and impressed" by The Wisdom of Yoga, calling it a useful guide and an alternative to the "often impenetrable" translations and commentaries on the Yoga Sutras.

== Works ==
- Yoga and the Quest for the True Self, Bantam, 2000. ISBN 978-0553386073
- Will Yoga & Meditation Really Change My Life?, Storey, 2003. ISBN 978-1580175098
- The Wisdom of Yoga: A Seeker's Guide to Extraordinary Living, Bantam, 2007. ISBN 978-0553380545
- The Great Work of Your Life: A Guide for the Journey to Your True Calling, Bantam Dell, 2015. ISBN 978-0553386073
- Deep Human Connection: Why We Need It More than Anything Else [originally titled Soul Friends: The Transforming Power of Deep Human Connection], Hay House, 2019. ISBN 978-1401946531
