= Mindful Yoga =

Buddhist-style mindfulness practice with yoga as exercise

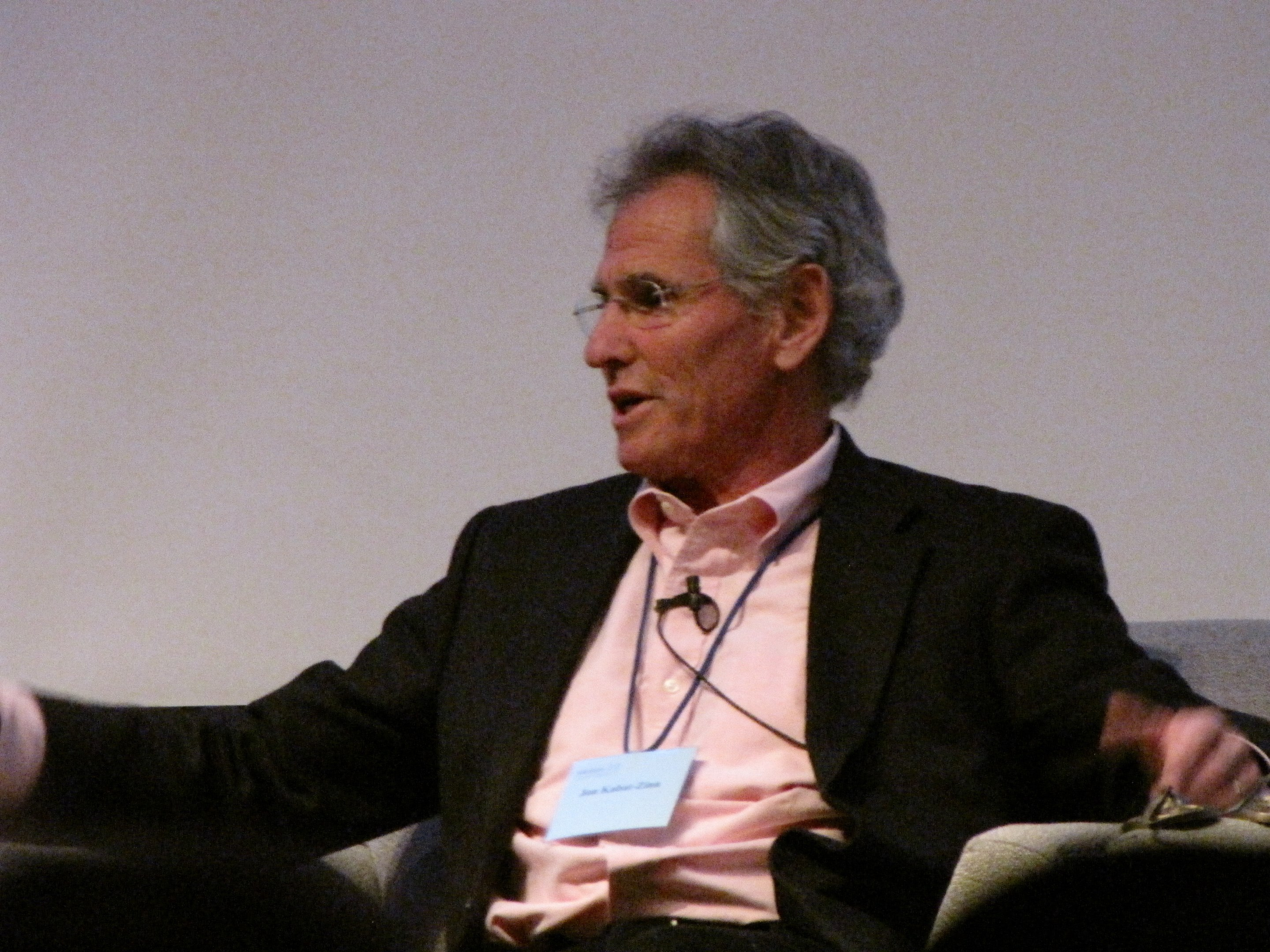
Professor Jon Kabat-Zinn pioneered the use of Mindful Yoga to treat stress at his Mindfulness-Based Stress Reduction clinic.

Mindful Yoga or Mindfulness Yoga combines Buddhist-style mindfulness practice with yoga as exercise to provide a means of exercise that is also meditative and useful for reducing stress. Buddhism and Hinduism have since ancient times shared many aspects of philosophy and practice including mindfulness, understanding the suffering caused by an erroneous view of reality, and using concentrated and meditative states to address such suffering.

The use of a hybrid of yoga and mindfulness for stress was pioneered by Jon Kabat-Zinn in America in 1990. It has since been advocated in differing forms by yoga and meditation teachers and authors from many backgrounds, such as Anne Cushman, Frank Jude Boccio, Stephen Cope, Janice Gates, Cyndi Lee, Phillip Moffitt, and Sarah Powers. Courses in Mindful Yoga are provided in Buddhist meditation centres, yoga studios, and stress clinics around the world.

== Origins ==
=== Ancient ===
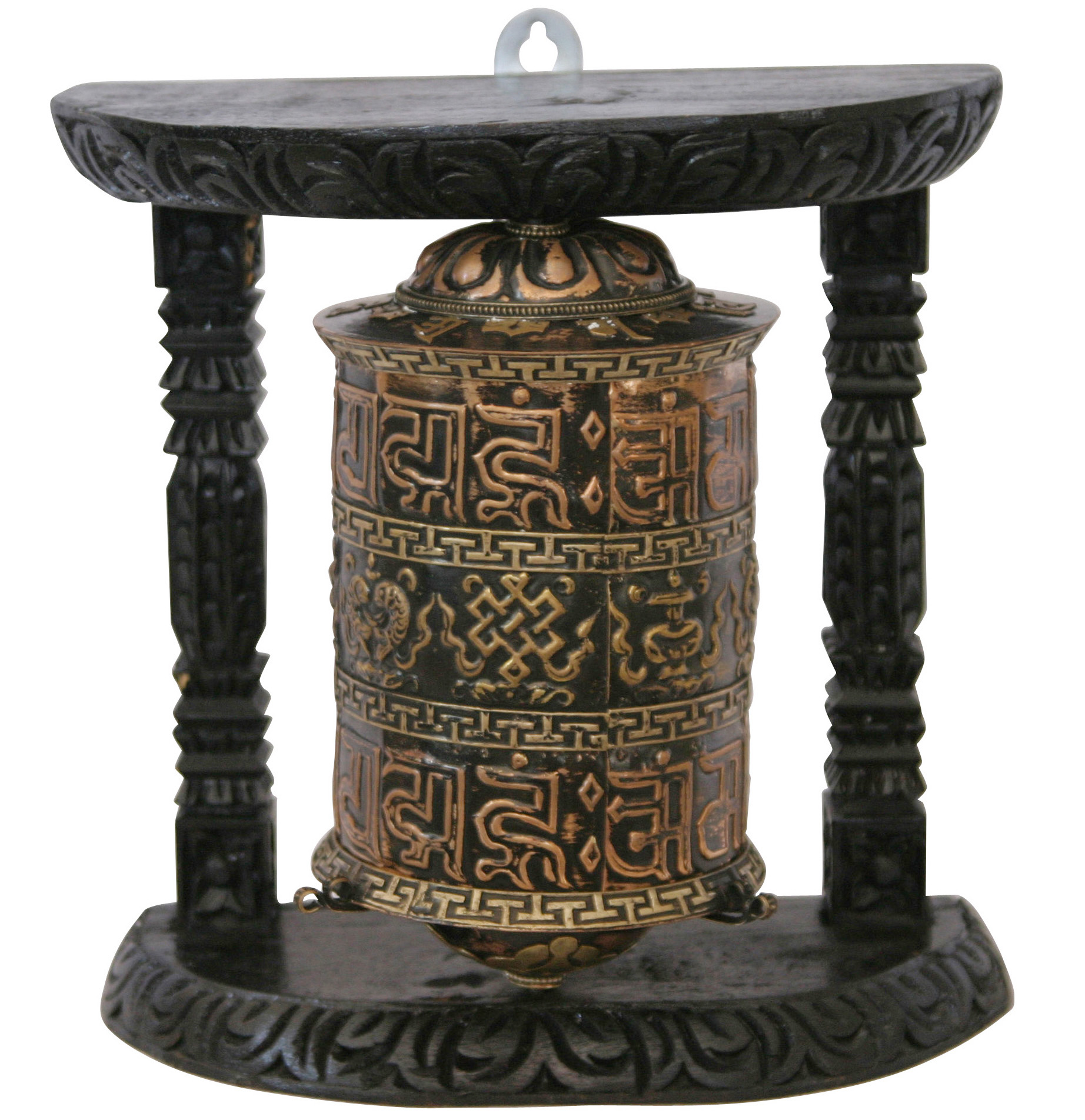
Hinduism and Buddhism share many of the concepts behind Mindful Yoga, such as karma, the endless chain of cause-and-effect, symbolised by the endless knot at the centre of this Nepalese prayer wheel.

The teacher of Mindful Yoga Anne Cushman notes that Hatha yoga and Buddhist meditation are branches of the same Indian contemplative tradition. In her view, asanas are both objects of meditation, and useful for preparing mind and body for sitting meditation, while Buddhism offers a formal structure of meditation techniques and philosophy that can exploit the "sensitivity, concentration, discipline and energy cultivated during asana practice."

In his 2006 book The Wisdom of Yoga, the psychotherapist and yoga scholar Stephen Cope examines the overlap of Patanjali's raja yoga and Buddhism. He notes that both were mainly concerned with "the problem of suffering, and the problem of seeing reality clearly." Both traditions provided three sets of tools: techniques for cultivating skilful behaviour to reduce suffering; techniques to develop intense states of concentration; and ways of investigating how the "self" is constructed by the mind. Both recognise "ordinary reality" as a confusing mental construction, as modern constructivism does, Cope writes. They agree that abolishing such confusion of thought permanently ends suffering. They agree, too, he states, on numerous "pillars" of their accounts of reality, with the concepts of nirodha (stilling the mind), klesha (afflictions), karma (cause and effect), samvega (urgent desire to change), samadhi (concentration), prajna (insight into reality), and samskara (impressions on consciousness). However, Cope writes, the meditation and "insight" practices described by Patanjali are missing from the mainstream Western tradition of yoga, though they are taught within Buddhism.

=== Modern ===
The professor of medicine and pioneer of Mindfulness Yoga Jon Kabat-Zinn wrote in 1990 that "Mindful hatha yoga is the third major formal meditation technique that we practice in the stress clinic [at the University of Massachusetts Medical School], along with the body scan (Note: Cushman states "This body-sensing journey [in which full attention is given to one part of the body after another, feeling any sensations that are there] ... is one variation of the ancient practice of Yoga nidra ... and of the body-scan technique commonly used in the Buddhist Vipassana tradition.") and sitting meditation…" Kabat-Zinn developed the original course in Mindfulness-Based Stress Reduction including sitting meditation and Mindful Yoga.

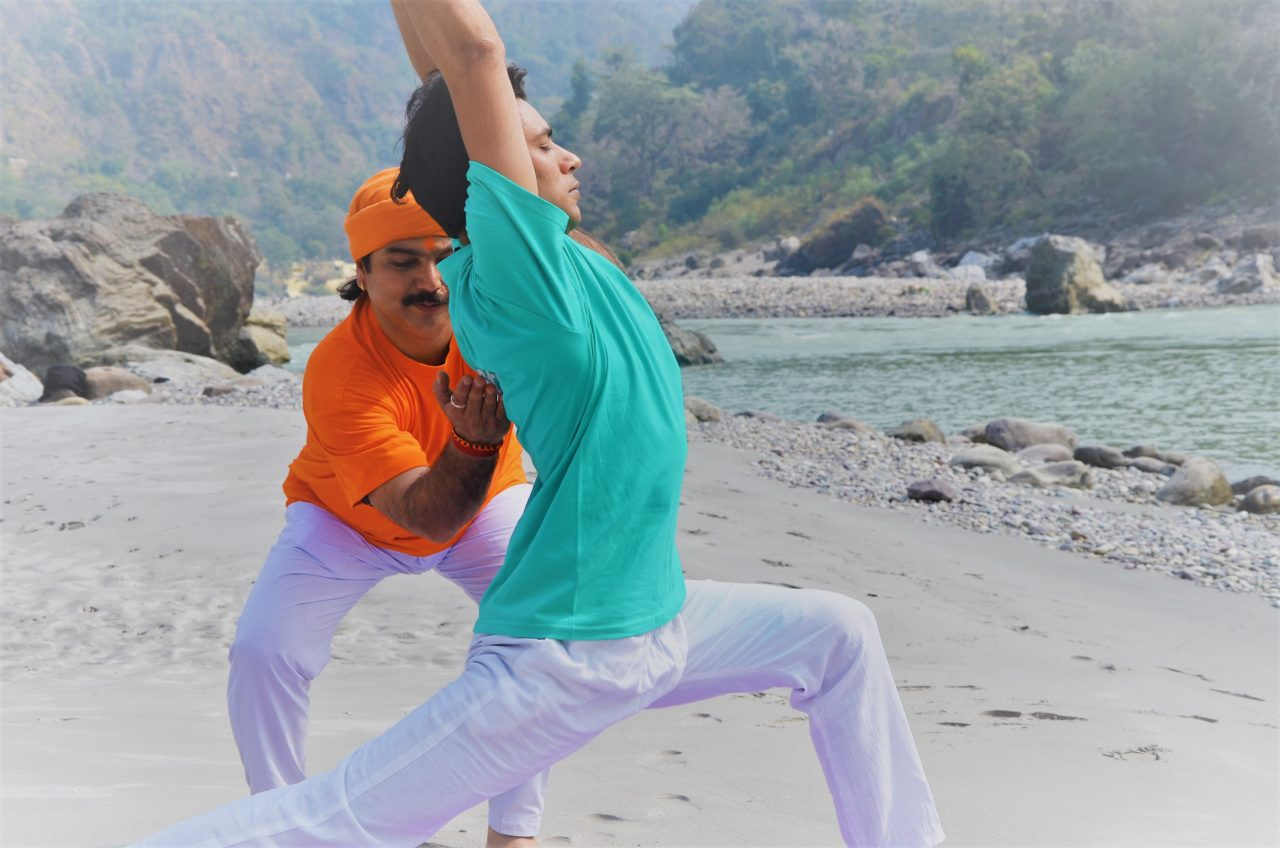
Practitioners can use yoga asanas such as Virabhadrasana I as an opportunity to observe their thoughts and sensations.

In 2008, the yoga teacher and editor of Yoga Journal Nora Isaacs wrote a feature on bringing "Mindfulness onto the Mat", noting that teachers from many backgrounds, such as Frank Jude Boccio, Cope, Janice Gates, Cyndi Lee, Phillip Moffitt, and Sarah Powers, had "each, independently, discovered the benefits of merging mindfulness with asana", leading to "something we might call 'Mindful Yoga'." Isaacs described the benefit of not reacting to the discomfort that one might feel in a standing asana such as Virabhadrasana I, instead just observing one's thoughts and sensations in the pose. She commented that the Noble Eightfold Path of Buddhism and the Patanjali's eight-limbed yoga have similarities, both going from "ethical practices and conduct and include training in concentration and awareness." She quotes Cope as saying that he sees "Buddha and Patanjali as brothers, using different languages, but speaking about and pointing to the same thing". Isaacs writes that yoga stresses concentration on a single object such as the breath, whereas Buddhism calls for mindfulness of all events as they come to one's consciousness. She quotes Boccio as saying that he does not just practice asanas mindfully; "I teach and practice mindfulness through the form of asana." Isaacs reports, too, that Cushman finds that mindfulness practice can enliven yoga for people who find sitting meditation difficult.

== Practice ==
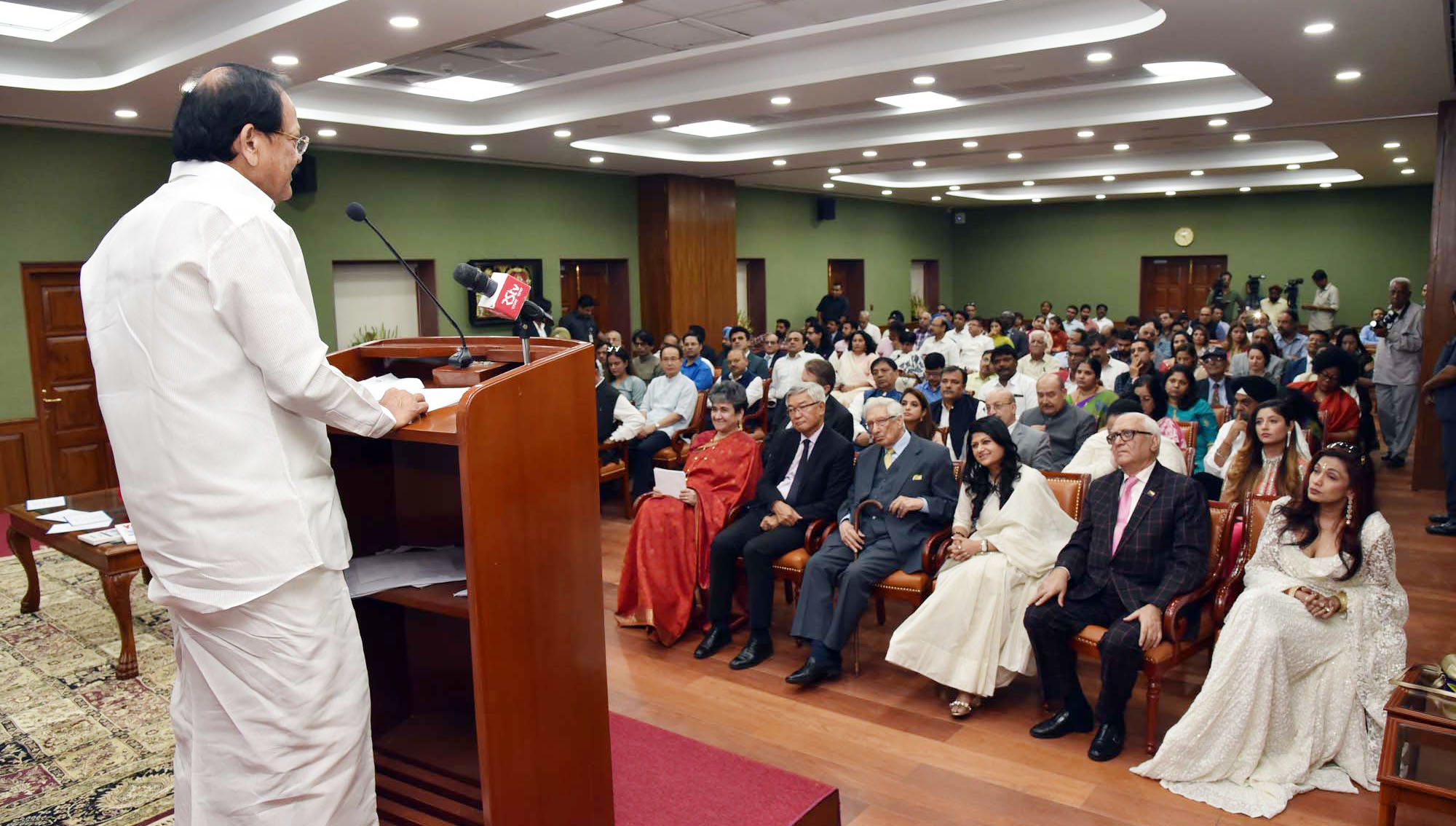
The Vice President of India, Venkaiah Naidu, releasing Mansi Gulati's book Yoga and Mindfulness, New Delhi, 2018

Cope notes in addition that yoga's asanas and pranayama, yoga breathing, "have found their way into many Buddhist meditation retreats", just as Buddhist meditation practices have appeared in yoga studios, so the "sister traditions" are beginning a "rapprochement", or a continuation of the exchange of practices and thinking that has carried on for two millennia.

Cushman writes that when she first taught yoga on a meditation retreat, her pupils told her that doing yoga gave them a fresh way to connect to "mindful presence", and made it easier to bring what they had discovered in meditation back into daily life.

The practice of Mindful Yoga has spread to meditation centres and stress clinics, with drop-in classes and courses available around the world, for example in the West London Buddhist Centre.

== Books ==
In 2004, Boccio published Mindfulness Yoga, relating Buddhism, especially the techniques of the Anapanasati Sutta and Satipatthana Sutta, to Yoga, especially the Yoga Sutras, and asanas. Also in 2004, Lee published her Yoga Body, Buddha Mind, advocating a combined practice, stating that "yoga helps Buddhists embody their meditation ... Similarly, the specific focus of Buddhist mindfulness and compassion helps the yogi's mind become unbiased, wakeful, and connected". This has been followed by other books such as Charlotte Bell's 2005 Mindful Yoga, Mindful Life: A Guide for Everyday Practice, structured around the eight limbs of Patanjali's yoga, Anne Cushman's 2014 Moving into Meditation with awareness of the body, Hannah Moss's 2018 The Practice of Mindful Yoga: A Connected Path to Awareness, which argues that "Yoga is only safe and effective when it has mindfulness at its heart", and Robert Butera's 2018 Body Mindful Yoga: Create a Powerful and Affirming Relationship with Your Body.

== Sources ==
- Cushman, Anne (2014). Moving into Meditation: A 12-Week Mindfulness Program for Yoga Practitioners. Shambhala. ISBN 978-1611800982.
