= John Stevens (Tennessee politician) =

American politician (born 1973)

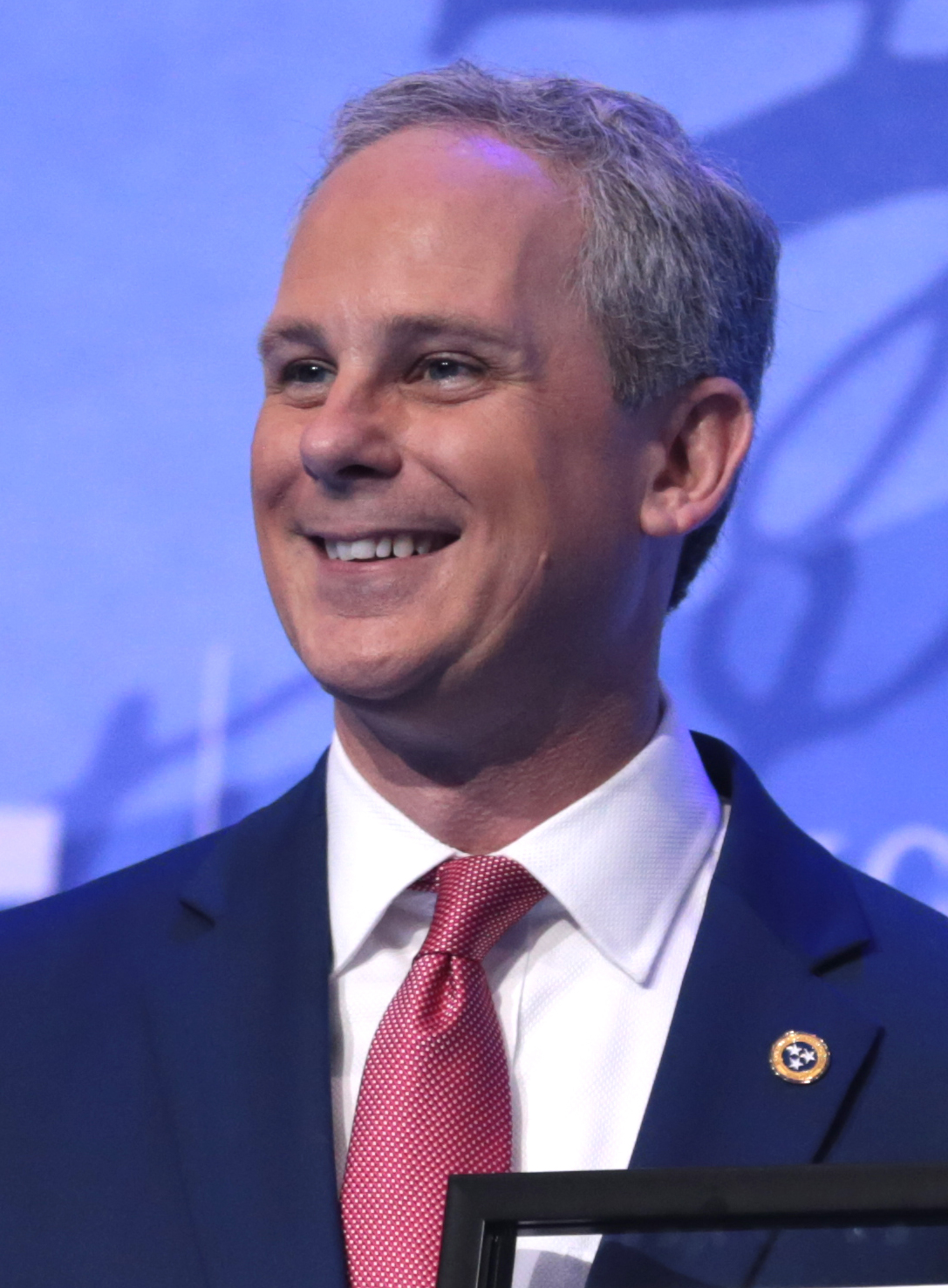
- Stevens in 2017

Member of the Tennessee Senate from the 24th district
- Incumbent
- Assumed office January 8, 2013
- Preceded by: Roy Herron

Personal details
- Born: October 18, 1973 (age 53)
- Party: Republican
- Spouse: Elicia Stevens
- Children: 2
- Education: University of Tennessee at Martin (BS); University of Memphis (JD)

John Stevens (born October 18, 1973) is an American politician who serves in the Tennessee Senate from the 24th district as a member of the Republican Party.

== Early life ==
John Stevens was born on October 18, 1973. From 1992 to 1996, he attended the University of Tennessee at Martin and graduated with a Bachelor of Science in political science and English. From 1999 to 2000, he attended Cumberland School of Law. From 2000 to 2002, he attended the University of Memphis and graduated with a Juris Doctor.

== Tennessee Senate ==
=== Elections ===
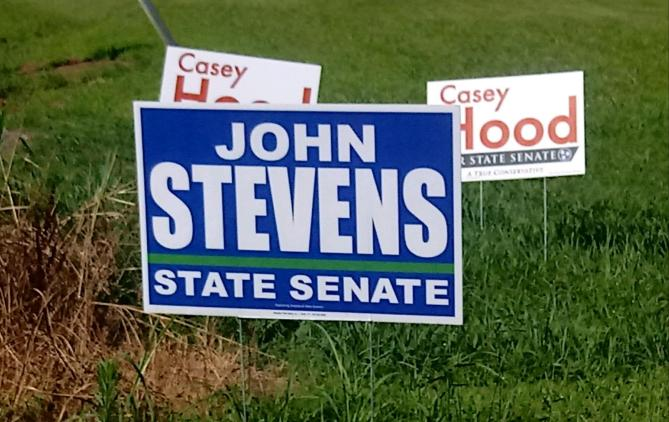
John Stevens' campaign sign

In 2012, Stevens won the Republican primary against Danny C. Jowers for a seat in the Tennessee Senate from the 24th district. In the general election he defeated Democratic nominee Brad Thompson. In 2016, Stevens won in the Republican primary and general election without opposition.

During the 2020 Republican primary Governor Bill Lee campaigned for Stevens. In the Republican primary Stevens defeated Casey L. Hood.

=== Tenure ===
During the 2020 United States Senate election in Tennessee Stevens endorsed Bill Hagerty.

== Political positions ==
=== Marijuana ===
On July 1, 2020, Nashville District Attorney Glenn Funk announced that people with less than half an ounce of marijuana would not be prosecuted. Stevens criticized Funk and stated that "the honorable thing to do is resign your office".

=== Ratings ===
In 2017, the American Conservative Union gave Stevens a 100% rating. The NRA Political Victory Fund gave Stevens an "A+" rating and endorsed him for reelection in 2020. In 2020, Americans for Prosperity gave Stevens an rating of 108%.

== Electoral history ==
2012 Tennessee Senate 24th district election
Primary election
Party	Candidate	Votes	%
Republican	John Stevens	5,419	60.92%
Republican	Danny C. Jowers	3,476	39.08%
Total votes		8,895	100.00%
General election
Republican	John Stevens	38,667	56.47%
Democratic	Danny C. Jowers	29,807	43.53%
Total votes		68,474	100.00%

2016 Tennessee Senate 24th district election
Primary election
Party	Candidate	Votes	%
Republican	John Stevens (incumbent)	9,474	100.00%
Total votes		9,474	100.00%
General election
Republican	John Stevens (incumbent)	46,945	100.00%
Total votes		46,945	100.00%

2020 Tennessee Senate 24th district election
Primary election
Party	Candidate	Votes	%
Republican	John Stevens (incumbent)	13,061	61.24%
Republican	Casey L. Hood	8,266	38.76%
Total votes		21,327	100.00%
General election
Republican	John Stevens	63,532	87.84%
Independent	Yahweh Yahweb	8,795	12.16%
Total votes		72,327	100.00%

2024 Tennessee Senate 24th district election
Primary election
Party	Candidate	Votes	%
Republican	John Stevens (incumbent)	12,488	75.03%
Republican	Charles Cooper	4,156	24.97%
Total votes		16,644	100.00%
General election
Republican	John Stevens (incumbent)	72,507	100.00%
Total votes		72,507	100.00%
