= Roy Herron =

American politician (1953–2023)

Chair of the Tennessee Democratic Party
- In office January 23, 2013 – January 10, 2015
- Preceded by: Chip Forrester
- Succeeded by: Mary Mancini

Member of the Tennessee Senate from the 24th district
- In office January 14, 1997 – January 8, 2013
- Preceded by: Milton H. Hamilton Jr.
- Succeeded by: John Stevens

Member of the Tennessee House of Representatives from the 76th district
- In office January 13, 1987 – January 14, 1997
- Preceded by: Ned McWherter
- Succeeded by: Mark Maddox

Personal details
- Born: September 30, 1953
- Died: July 9, 2023 (aged 69) Nashville, Tennessee, U.S.
- Party: Democratic
- Spouse: Nancy Carol Miller Herron
- Children: 3
- Education: University of Tennessee, Martin (BS); University of St. Andrews; Vanderbilt University (MDiv, JD)

Roy Herron (September 30, 1953 – July 9, 2023) was an American politician, attorney, and author. He was the chairman of the Tennessee Democratic Party. He was the Tennessee State Senator for the 24th district for 16 years and for 10 years before that the State Representative for the 76th district. He was the 2010 Democratic nominee for U.S. Representative for Tennessee's 8th congressional district.

The senate district encompassed Benton, Decatur, Henry, Henderson, Lake, Obion, Perry, Stewart, and Weakley counties.

== Early life, education and career ==
Roy Herron grew up in Weakley County, Tennessee, where his ancestor was one of the first two settlers in the 1820s. Herron grew up working on his family's farm and became an Eagle Scout.

Herron graduated with highest honors from the University of Tennessee at Martin in 1975. Herron was the 9th Governor of the Tennessee Intercollegiate State Legislature, a statewide organization of college students. Before serving as Governor, he was Lieutenant Governor of the organization. In 1975 and 1976 he was a Rotary Scholar in Scotland at the University of St. Andrews. He graduated from Vanderbilt University in 1980, with a M.Div. and a J.D. as one of the first two joint law and divinity graduates.

Herron worked as an attorney and a businessman. He served for many years as adjunct faculty at Vanderbilt University's law and divinity schools where he taught courses he created. He also worked as a United Methodist minister. He helped found and served as the co-chair of FaithfulDemocrats.com, an online community for Democrats of Christian faith. He also founded and led the non-profit Volunteer Center for Rural Development.

== Tennessee Legislature ==
Herron was first elected to the Tennessee House of Representatives in 1986 to fill Governor Ned McWherter's seat. He served in the House in the 95th through 99th Tennessee General Assemblies and in the Senate in the 100th through 107th. He rose to become floor leader and then chairman of the Senate Democratic Caucus. He also chaired the Select Committee on Children and Youth, the Senate General Welfare, Health and Human Resources Committee, and the Joint Tenncare Oversight Committee. He was a member of the Senate Finance, Ways and Means Committee, the Senate Government Operations Committee, the Joint Committee on Charitable Gaming, and the Joint Select Committee on Education. Herron was known for his work ethic (he attended every legislative session for 26 years except the day his youngest son was being born), his debating skills, and his strong advocacy for those he called "the working people and the hurting people".

Herron did not seek re-election in 2012.

== 2010 U.S. Congressional campaign ==
In April 2009, Herron announced that he would be running for Governor of Tennessee in the Democratic primary, but in December 2009, he declared as a candidate for Tennessee's 8th congressional district when Congressman John S. Tanner announced his retirement. Herron quickly became the frontrunner and other strong contenders did not challenge him. He was easily victorious in the August 2010 primary.

Herron faced Republican nominee Stephen Fincher; Tea Party candidate Donn Janes, who earlier dropped out of the Republican primary; and Independent Mark J. Rawles. Despite raising over $2 million, a record amount for a Tennessee Democratic congressional candidate, Herron lost to Fincher in November in the massive Republican wave which swept through Tennessee and the nation.

Herron did not have to give up his state senate seat to run in the congressional race; Tennessee state senators serve staggered four-year terms.

=== Endorsements ===
In the congressional race, Herron was endorsed by the state's two largest newspapers, the Memphis Commercial Appeal and the Nashville Tennessean, as well as every other endorsing newspaper, a total of at least eight newspapers.

== Chairmanship of the Tennessee Democratic Party ==
Herron was elected in 2013 as Tennessee Democratic Party Chairman.

His work as chairman was categorized as successful, despite challenging times with a divided State Executive Committee and Democratic superminorities in the Tennessee General Assembly.

Herron set records in Jackson Day fundraising and spoke out with unprecedented numbers of op-ed essays in major newspapers in the state. In the summer of 2014, he led a quiet but effective effort to save the Democratic justices on the Tennessee Supreme Court, successfully raising unprecedented funds for retaining the court. In the fall, he also led the party to victories in five of their seven targeted races in 2014 despite Republican advantages in numbers of office holders, funding, and outside groups weighing in heavily in state races.

In January 2015, Democratic activist and former candidate for State Senate Mary Mancini was elected to succeed Herron.

== Personal life ==
Herron and his wife had three sons: John, Rick, and Ben. The couple lived in Dresden southeast of Martin, Tennessee.

On July 1, 2023, Herron was injured in a jet ski accident on Kentucky Lake. He died at Vanderbilt University Medical Center on July 9, at the age of 69.

== Works ==
- Roy Herron, Things Held Dear: Soul Stories for My Sons, Westminster John Knox Press; 1st edition (July 1999), ISBN 978-0-664-22147-8
- Roy Herron (author), L.H. "Cotton Ivy" (co-author), Tennessee Political Humor: Some Of These Jokes You Voted For, Univ Tennessee Press (November 2000), ISBN 978-1-57233-102-0
- Roy Herron, How Can a Christian Be in Politics?: A Guide Toward Faithful Politics (Vital Questions), Tyndale House Publishers (March 2005), ISBN 978-0-8423-8108-6
- Roy Herron, God and Politics: How Can A Christian Be In Politics?, Tyndale House Publishers, Inc. (July 2008), ISBN 978-1-4143-2305-3
