= Mary Mancini =

American politician

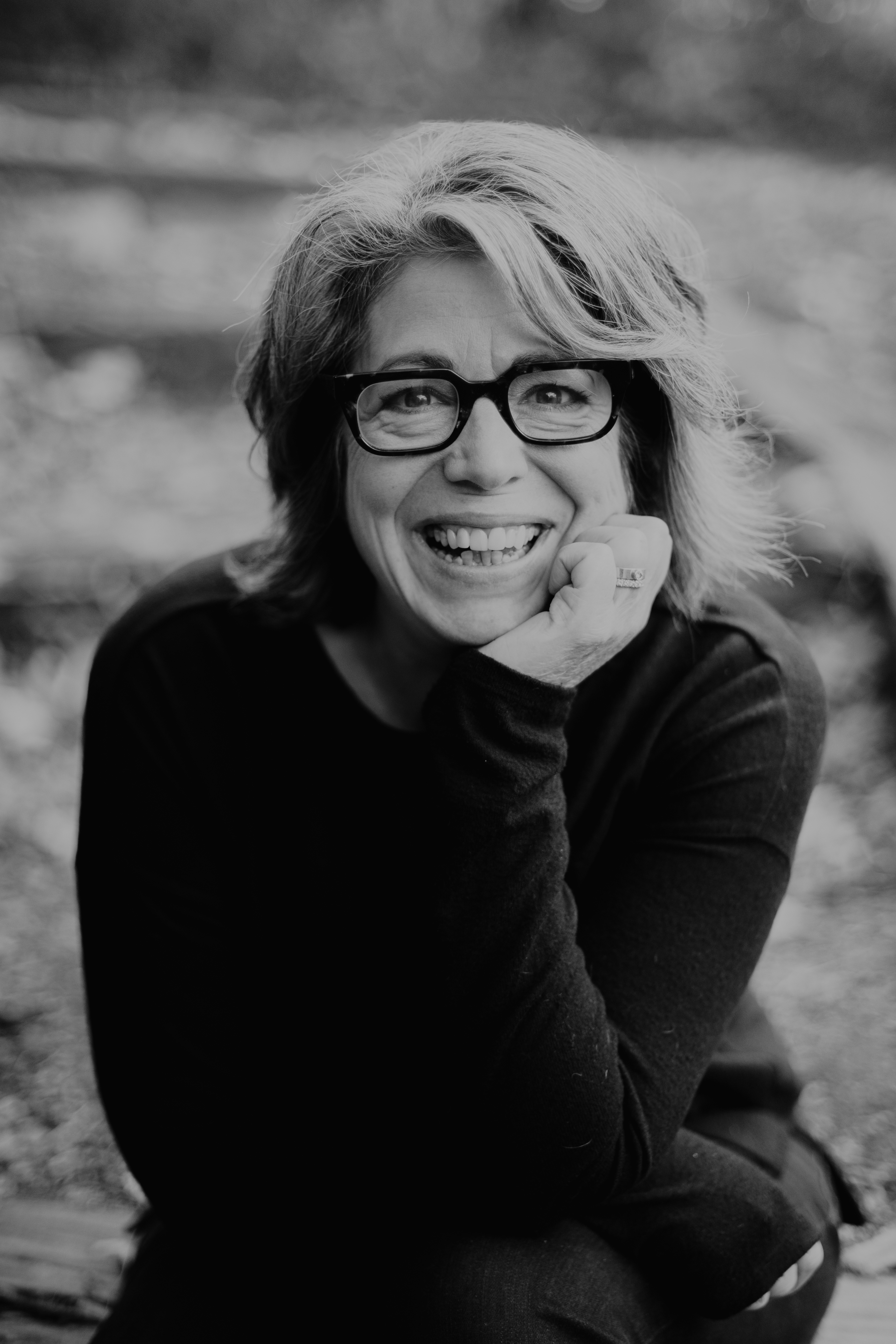

Chair of the Tennessee Democratic Party
- In office January 10, 2015 – January 16, 2021
- Preceded by: Roy Herron
- Succeeded by: Hendrell Remus

Personal details
- Born: July 17 Seaford, New York, U.S.
- Party: Democratic
- Spouse: Kurt Wagner
- Education: Syracuse University (BS)

Mary Mancini is a multimedia producer for Nashville Public Radio's daily show, This is Nashville. Previously, she was an American political activist and former candidate, who served as Chair of the Tennessee Democratic Party from 2015 to 2021. She was elected as Chair of the Tennessee Democratic Party on January 10, 2015 as the second woman to be elected to that position and was re-elected to a second two-year term in January 2017 and a third in January 2019. She was a candidate for Tennessee State Senate District 21 and lost in the 2014 Democratic primary to Jeff Yarbro. She had previously served as Executive Director of Tennessee Citizen Action, an advocacy and grassroots organizing group based in Nashville. She also was the co-host of Liberadio with Mary Mancini and Freddie O'Connell, a liberal radio show. From 1992 to 1998 she was the owner of Lucy's Record Shop. After she sold Lucy's, she went to work in technology, first at Telalink, an internet service and web hosting provider, and then at Monsterlabs, a software development company. In 2023, she produced and hosted the Lucy's Record Shop podcast, which told some of the stories behind the Nashville record store and all-ages punk club.

== Personal life ==
Mary Mancini is married to Nashville musician Kurt Wagner of the band Lambchop.

Party political offices
Preceded by Roy Herron	Chair of the Tennessee Democratic Party; 2015–2021	Succeeded by Hendrell Remus
