= Hendrell Remus =

American political figure

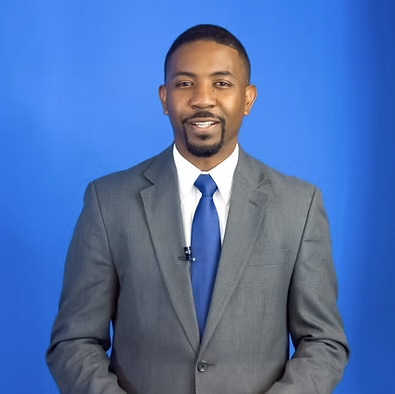

Chair of the Tennessee Democratic Party
- In office January 16, 2021 – January 25, 2025
- Preceded by: Mary Mancini
- Succeeded by: Rachel Campbell

Personal details
- Born: December 17, 1986 (age 38); Memphis, Tennessee, U.S.
- Political party: Democratic
- Spouse: Marlene Remus
- Children: 2
- Education: Excelsior College (BA)

Hendrell Remus is an American political figure who was the first Black person to chair the Tennessee Democratic Party since 2021. He was unanimously re-elected in 2023.

Remus' political participation was driven by volunteerism that led him into the 2008 campaign of Barack Obama.

Prior to becoming chair, Remus worked as the assistant director of emergency management at Tennessee State University, a role that followed his tenure as the Middle TN Operations Manager for Allied Universal.

He is a native of Memphis, and a graduate of Excelsior College.

Party political offices
Preceded by Mary Mancini	Chair of the Tennessee Democratic Party; 2021–2025	Succeeded by Rachel Campbell
