= Anne Cushman =

American yoga teacher

Anne Cushman (born c. 1964) is an American teacher of yoga as exercise and meditation, a writer on Mindful Yoga, and a novelist. Her novel Enlightenment for Idiots was named by Booklist as one of the top ten novels of 2008. Cushman has also been an editor for Yoga Journal and Tricycle: The Buddhist Review. She directs mentoring programs and multi-year meditation training for yoga teachers at the Spirit Rock Meditation Center, emphasizing the fusion of yoga and Buddhist meditation and highlighting their shared history and philosophy.

== Education ==
Cushman obtained her bachelor's degree in comparative religion at Princeton University in 1984. She completed Spirit Rock Meditation Center's 2-year "Community Dharma Leader" and its 4-year "Dharma Retreat Teacher" training courses.

== Career ==
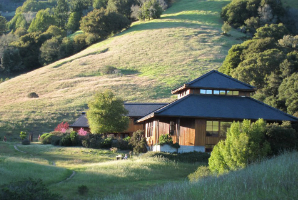
Cushman is closely involved with the Mindfulness meditation program at Spirit Rock Meditation Center.

Cushman directs the mentoring element of the Mindfulness meditation teacher certification program at Spirit Rock, where in 2007 she and dharma instructor Phillip Moffitt founded the first multi-year Buddhist meditation training for yoga teachers. She has taught around a hundred yoga and meditation retreats and trainings. She notes in her book Moving into Meditation that "the fusion of yoga asana and Buddhist meditation—once viewed as heretical in both camps—has [by 2014] become common." She adds that "Mindful yoga" is not "just a random combination of techniques cooked up by marketing professionals", but that mindfulness meditation and the asanas of hatha yoga are "different strands of the same braided rope of yogic history and philosophy" developed in India over the past 2,500 years.

Cushman was for 8 years an editor of Yoga Journal; she has also been also West Coast editor of Tricycle: The Buddhist Review. She has written articles for both journals, and for others including Yoga International.

She has given numerous talks on topics related to meditation, for example on dharma (right living). She has led workshops at the Kripalu Center for Yoga & Health. She presents "embodied mindfulness" retreats for women. As a writer and a teacher of yoga and Buddhist meditation, she stated in an interview with Integral Yoga magazine that to her, both yoga and writing are full-time "mastery paths".

== Personal life ==
Cushman married a classmate from Princeton in 1999, divorcing in 2002. She lives with her son in Fairfax, California. She travelled to India in 2007 on a "pilgrimage" to visit places associated with the Buddha; the trip provided material for her 2009 novel Enlightenment for Idiots.

== Books ==
=== Enlightenment for Idiots ===
Hillari Dowdle, reviewing Enlightenment for Idiots in Yoga Journal, noted that chick lit was hardly the usual genre for insight into yoga philosophy. But in Dowdle's opinion, the book succeeds on both counts, being enjoyably entertaining and "capturing the ashrams and gurus that attract Western spiritual seekers." A character called Mr. Kapoor whom she compares to B. K. S. Iyengar is enthused about by his students: "He'll crucify you over a metal folding chair"; she recognises characters Prana Ma, resembling the hugging guru Mata Amritanandamayi (widely known as Amma), and Saraswati, resembling Gangaji, who demands that her students understand that "Self and Other are merely constructs to be transcended". Such characters, Dowdle notes, are "ripe for a little satire", but between the lines of the "fun romp" is genuine wisdom. Publishers Weekly called the book "a hilarious take on the quest for truth that manages to respect the journey while skewering many of the travelers." Anna Douglas, on Inquiring Mind, described it as "a winning combination of romance, satire and spiritual adventure. In particular, it speaks to the paradoxical issues that women often face when they immerse themselves in Asian spiritual traditions."

=== Moving into Meditation ===
Lisa Francesca, in Yoga Teacher magazine, wrote that Moving into Meditation: A 12-Week Mindfulness Program for Yoga Practitioners, combines Cushman's experience in Mindful Yoga and teachings with practical resources in the form of names of yoga and meditation teachers "and their books", along with "short wisdom stories from contemporary yogis and meditators" and audio and video materials on her website, enabling the reviewer to work through the exercises (combining asana practice, pranayama, and meditation) at her own pace. Francesca recommended the book highly for "gentle self-exploration and expansion."

=== Other works ===
- (1998) From Here to Nirvana
- (2012) The Mindful Way Through Pregnancy (with Mimi Doe, Judy Leif, Jennifer Brilliant)
- (2019) The Mama Sutra
