= Tennessee's 24th Senate district =

American legislative district

Tennessee's 24th State Senate district
Senator
John Stevens; R–Huntingdon
- Demographics: 83% White; 9% Black; 3% Hispanic; 1% Asian; 3% Multiracial
- Population (2022): 212,667

Tennessee's 24th Senate district is one of 33 districts in the Tennessee Senate. It has been represented by Republican John Stevens since 2012, succeeding Democrat Roy Herron.

== Geography ==
District 24 covers much of rural northern West Tennessee, including all of Benton, Carroll, Gibson, Henry, Houston, Obion, Stewart, and Weakley Counties. Communities in the district include Martin, Paris, Union City, Humbolt, Milan, McKenzie, Trenton, Huntingdon, Medina, Camden, and Dresden.

The district is located mostly within Tennessee's 8th congressional district, with part in the 7th district. The district borders the state of Kentucky.

== Recent election results ==
Tennessee Senators are elected to staggered four-year terms, with odd-numbered districts holding elections in midterm years and even-numbered districts holding elections in presidential years.

=== 2020 ===
2020 Tennessee Senate election, District 24
Primary election
Party	Candidate	Votes	%
Republican	John Stevens (incumbent)	13,059	61.2
Republican	Casey Hood	8,264	38.8
Total votes		21,323	100
General election
Republican	John Stevens (incumbent)	63,532	87.8
Independent	Yahweh Yahweh	8,795	12.2
Total votes		72,327	100
Republican hold			

=== 2016 ===
2016 Tennessee Senate election, District 24
Party	Candidate	Votes	%
Republican	John Stevens (incumbent)	46,945	100
Total votes		46,945	100
Republican hold			

=== 2012 ===
2012 Tennessee Senate election, District 24
Primary election
Party	Candidate	Votes	%
Republican	John Stevens	5,419	60.9
Republican	Danny Jowers	3,476	39.1
Total votes		8,895	100
General election
Republican	John Stevens	38,667	56.5
Democratic	Brad Thompson	29,807	43.5
Total votes		68,474	100
Republican gain from Democratic			

=== Federal and statewide results ===
Year	Office	Results
2020	President	Trump 75.8 – 22.6%
2016	President	Trump 73.9 – 23.6%
2012	President	Romney 66.9 – 31.7%
2012	Senate	Corker 67.6 – 28.0%
