= Tennessee Intercollegiate State Legislature =

- The modern version of the official seal was designed by Tonya Kelley from The University of Memphis.
- Abbreviation: TISL
- Formation: 1966
- Headquarters: Nashville, Tennessee
- Members: Every accredited institution of higher education in Tennessee
- Governor: Milind Chaturvedi
- Lt. Governor: Anthony Griffin
- Speaker of the House: Harrison Simpson
- Chief Justice: Cheyenne Bare
- Board of directors: Jacob Baggett, Executive Director
- Website: www.TISLonline.org

The Tennessee Intercollegiate State Legislature (TISL) is an annual legislative session conducted by college students from across Tennessee, providing students over with an education about Tennessee state government and a channel to express their opinions on state issues.

This model legislature convenes in the State Capitol for four days, typically in November. It consists of a Senate and a House of Representatives, which debate bills that are produced wholly by the students. The Supreme Court consists of judges and lawyers participating in the Appellate Moot Court Collegiate Challenge (AMC3). Students also have the option to work as lobbyists or members of the media.

During each General Assembly, officers are elected to serve on the Executive Council that governs the organization for the following year. The Executive Council chooses from ten bills that have passed in both the House and the Senate and designates them as Priority Legislation to be presented to the Tennessee General Assembly. Many of TISL's bills have become state law.

== History ==
The history of the Tennessee Intercollegiate State Legislature is a story of students taking the initiative and providing leadership to organize themselves for learning about state government and expressing their views on state issues.

In 1966, Dr. Douglas Carlisle, a political science professor at the University of Tennessee at Knoxville, approached the Student Government Association with the concept of TISL. Dr. Carlisle was familiar with similar programs in North Carolina and South Carolina.

Events of the 1960s were important to TISL's founding. President John F. Kennedy's emphasis on student activism motivated young people across the nation before he was assassinated in 1963. His death heightened the resolve of many students to participate and make a difference. Important federal laws under President Lyndon Johnson such as the Civil Rights Act of 1964, the Voting Rights Act of 1965 and other far-reaching programs were focusing attention on the role of government. Student activism over the Vietnam War was growing.

It was also an exciting time in Tennessee politics. In Nashville, the Tennessee General Assembly was demonstrating the first stirrings of independence after decades under the control of the governor's office. The 1962 Baker v. Carr decision, a Tennessee case of national significance, led to the first redistricting of the legislature since 1900. This, in turn, produced a flood of new state senators and state representatives to change the political dynamic.

The legislature also began annual sessions after voters approved a constitutional amendment changing the legislative calendar. Consequently, Tennesseans were paying more attention to their state government than they'd paid in a long time. Republican Howard Baker's election to the U.S. Senate in 1966 introduced two-party competition for statewide offices and raised interest in politics.

The UTK student most intrigued with the TISL concept was Phillip Moffitt. Together, Moffitt and Dr. Carlisle contacted other student government associations across the state. At Vanderbilt University, they caught the interest of student Charles Bone. Bone and Moffitt were to become the first and second governors of TISL.

Records suggest that an organizational meeting occurred on the Vanderbilt campus in the spring or summer of 1966. The 1st General Assembly occurred in the fall at the State Capitol. Since that time, TISL has convened in nearly every academic year. The General Assembly has been displaced from the Capitol occasionally, usually because of construction. It has sometimes met in the auditorium of the War Memorial Building and in committee rooms of the Legislative Plaza.

The Tennessee Intercollegiate State Legislature Foundation was incorporated in 1976 under TISL Governor David Lillard Jr. and received a 501(c)(3) classification from the Internal Revenue Service a year later as a further result of Lillard's work.

In 2014, the record for most colleges in attendance was broken. With 43 colleges and universities in attendance, the 45th General Assembly of the Tennessee Intercollegiate State Legislature was the largest group of students to attend the conference.

== Officers ==
=== Executive Council ===
The ten-member Executive Council manages TISL throughout the year and prepares for the next General Assembly. Officers are ambassadors for TISL, which means they frequently call on other campuses, university administrators, and state officials. Officers’ duties and responsibilities are enumerated in Article V of the TISL Constitution.

The Executive Council consists of the Governor, Lieutenant Governor, Secretary of State, State Treasurer, Speaker of the House of Representatives, Speaker Pro Tempore of the House of Representatives, Speaker Pro Tempore of the Senate, Attorney General, Lobbying Director, Communications Director, and Chief Justice of the Tennessee Intercollegiate Supreme Court.

The current officers were elected at the 56th General Assembly to serve a one-year term. The current officers are:

Position	Office Holder	School name
Governor	Milind Chaturvedi	East Tennessee State University
Lieutenant Governor	Anthony Griffin	University of Memphis
Speaker Pro Tempore of the Senate	Hannah Ferreira	Middle Tennessee State University
Speaker of the House	Harrison Simpson	Tennessee Technological University
Speaker Pro Tempore of the House	Jeremiah Chambers	University of Tennessee at Chattanooga
Secretary of State	Jadah Freeman	University of Tennessee at Martin
State Treasurer	Mario Ulloa	East Tennessee State University
Attorney General	Charles Dorset	East Tennessee State University
Chief Justice of the Supreme Court	Cheyenne Bare	Tennessee Technological University
Lobbying Director	Jack Ford	University of Tennessee at Knoxville
Communications Director	Macy Miller	East Tennessee State University

=== Support Staff ===
In addition to the Executive Council, various other officers and support staff are appointed to help the Executive Council with the management of the different components of TISL. The Speakers of each chamber appoint a Chief Clerk to oversee the flow of legislation and keep records while in session. There is also a Deputy Clerk (and in some cases an Assistant Clerk) who help the Chief Clerk in his/her duties. Both the Secretary of State and State Treasurer appoint Deputies and Assistants to assist them in their responsibilities. The Supreme Court justices appoint a Chief Clerk and Marshall to oversee paperwork and records of the AMC3 competition. There are also a number of law clerks and courtroom clerks that help the AMC3 program function. A Director of Lobbying is appointed to coordinate that program, as well as a Media Director to oversee the media component. The Governor is assisted by a Chief of Staff and Cabinet, who advise him on bills and convey the Governor's wishes to Senators and Representatives.

== TISL Governors: Past & Present ==
The Governors of TISL and the schools they represented are listed below. The incumbent governor is Kyah Powers, and is indicated below in bold.

Year	Governor's Name	Governor's School
1966-1967	Phillip Moffitt	The University of Tennessee, Knoxville
1967-1968	Charles Bone	Vanderbilt University
1968-1969	Jonah Gray	East Tennessee State University
1969-1970	George DeJarnatt	Vanderbilt University
1970-1971	Chad McCullough	Tennessee Technological University
1971-1972	Frank Clement Jr.	The University of Memphis
1972-1973	David Fleming	Tennessee Technological University
1973-1974	Stephen Harris	East Tennessee State University
1974-1975	Roy Herron	The University of Tennessee, Martin
1975-1976	Philip Sanford	Austin Peay State University
1976-1977	David Lillard Jr.	The University of Memphis
1977-1978	Jeff Wilson	The University of Tennessee, Knoxville
1978-1979	Douglas Littlejohn	The University of Memphis
1979-1980	David Mason	Austin Peay State University
1980-1981	Kem Morgan	The University of Tennessee, Chattanooga
1981-1982	Randy Wilmore	Tennessee Technological University
1982-1983	Tony Yates	Middle Tennessee State University
1983-1984	Mark Ross	Middle Tennessee State University
1984-1985	Mark Ross	Middle Tennessee State University
1985-1986	Nathan Poss	Cumberland University
1986-1987	Glenn Keesee	Vanderbilt University
1987-1988	Alan Crone	The University of Memphis
1988-1989	David Sanford	Lincoln Memorial University
1990-1991	Kevin O'Connor	The University of Memphis
1991-1992	Mark L. Sluder	Tennessee Technological University
1992-1993	Mark L. Sluder	Tennessee Technological University
1993-1994	Tre Hargett	The University of Memphis
1994-1995	Steven L. Denney	Tennessee Technological University
1995-1996	Russell A. Humphrey	The University of Memphis
1996-1997	Elizabeth G. Millsaps	Middle Tennessee State University
1997-1998	Jeffrey F. Wisdom	The University of Memphis
1998-1999	Ashley Woods	Walters State Community College
1999-2000	Emily Cline	The University of Memphis
2000-2001	Lee Scott	Lambuth University
2001-2002	Josh Trent	Union University
2002-2003	Elizabeth Shelley	The University of Memphis
2005-2006	Joshua Clarke	Union University
2006-2007	Amir Bahreini	Cleveland State Community College & The University of Tennessee, Knoxville
2007-2008	Kenneth Taylor	The University of Memphis
2008-2009	Micah Roeder	Union University
2009-2010	Gian Gozum	The University of Memphis
2010-2011	Cory Higdon	The University of Memphis
2011-2012	Matthew Meinel	Vanderbilt University
2012-2013	Alexander R. Brown	Chattanooga State Community College
2013-2014	Jamie Arnett	The University of Tennessee, Martin & Austin Peay State University
2014-2015	Brandon Chrisman	The University of Tennessee, Knoxville
2015-2016	John Domanski	The University of Tennessee, Martin
2016-2017	Kara Gilliam	The University of Tennessee, Knoxville
2017-2018	James Matthew Wyatt	Union University
2018-2019	Faith Udobong	Rhodes College
2019-2020	Hunter McCloud	The University of Tennessee, Martin
2020-2021	Matthew Kenny	Rhodes College
2021-2022	Preston George	Middle Tennessee State University
2022-2023	Paige Foster	University of Memphis
2023-2024	Aiden Graybeal	East Tennessee State University
**2024-2025**	**Kyah Powers**	**East Tennessee State University**

== Notable TISL Alumni ==
Several alumni of the TISL program have gone into government and public serve in Tennessee and other states.

Name	Notes
Jeff Bivins	Tennessee Supreme Court Chief Justice
Mike Faulk	Tennessee Circuit Court Judge; Tennessee State Senator
Tre Hargett	Tennessee Secretary of State
Roy Herron	Chair of the Tennessee Democratic Party; Tennessee State Senator; Tennessee State Representative
Russell Humphrey	Chief Clerk of the Tennessee Senate
Mike Kernell	Tennessee State Representative
Holly Kirby	Tennessee Supreme Court Justice
David Lillard	Tennessee State Treasurer
Ron Lollar	Tennessee State Representative
Phillip Moffitt	Cofounder, author, executive
Doug Overbey	United States Attorney; Tennessee State Senator; Tennessee State Representative
Tony Shipley	Tennessee State Representative
