= Lakulish Yoga University =

- Type: Private
- Established: 2013
- Affiliations: UGC
- President: Dinesh Amin
- Location: Ahmedabad, Gujarat, India; 23.126908°N 72.538947°E
- Website: www.lyu.ac.in

Lakulish Yoga University is a private university located in Chharodi, near Ahmedabad, Gujarat, India, opposite Nirma University. The university was established in 2013 by the Lakulish International Fellowship's Enlightenment Mission (LIFE Mission) through The Gujarat Private Universities (Amendment) Act, 2013.

It provides higher education courses in Yoga and is claimed to be the private organization in India to offer Yoga education in India. It was opened in 2013 by its founder Swami Rajarshi Muni with a ceremony attended by Narendra Modi.
