= Lucy's (bar) =

Dive bar in New York City

Coordinates: 40°43′37″N 73°58′59″W

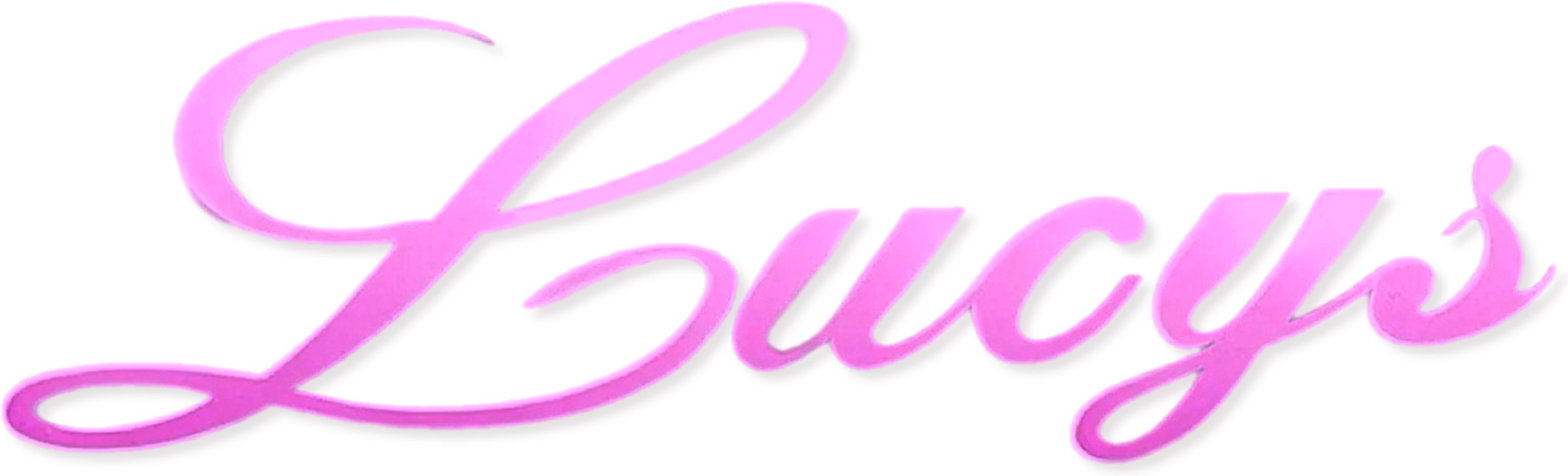
- Company type: Private
- Founded: 1987
- Founder: Ludwika "Lucy" Mickevicius
- Headquarters: 135 Avenue A, New York, NY 10009
- Area served: East Village, Manhattan, New York City
- Key people: Ludwika "Lucy" Mickevicius

Lucy's is a dive bar located in the East Village neighborhood of Manhattan in New York City. Owned and operated by Ludwika "Lucy" Mickevicius, the bar was a staple of the community from 1987 until its closure in 2024 due to eviction. Lucy's Bar reopened in March 2025.

== History ==
Ludwika "Lucy" Mickevicius, originally from Poland, became a bartender in the East Village in the early 1980s. She took over the bar, originally named Blanche’s, in December 1987. The establishment was later renamed Lucy's in her honor. Lucy's was known for its unchanging, no-frills atmosphere. The bar featured dim lighting, worn linoleum floors, pool tables, and a jukebox, retaining a vintage aesthetic that appealed to both long-time patrons and newcomers. Lucy's played a crucial role in the East Village's social scene, providing a sense of community in a neighborhood that underwent significant changes over the decades. It survived the Tompkins Square Park Riot in 1988 and the COVID-19 pandemic, during which it temporarily closed but reopened in May 2020.

In December 2023, the building housing Lucy's was sold to a new landlord, West Lake 135-139 Avenue A LLC / RYCO Capital, for $19 million. Following the sale, Mickevicius faced a significant rent increase from $8,000 to $25,000 per month. Despite her efforts to negotiate and even pay the increased rent temporarily, the financial burden was unsustainable. In addition to the rent hike, Lucy's faced other operational challenges, including issues with health department permits and a temporary closure in late 2023. The bar was ultimately closed in early 2024 when Mickevicius received an eviction notice demanding she vacate the premises within 30 days.

Golden Age Hospitality revived Lucy's and reopened it in March 2025.
