= Phillip Moffitt =

American Buddhist writer

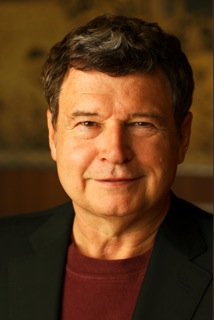
Phillip Moffitt

Phillip Moffitt (born 1946) is an American vipassana (insight) meditation teacher, former publishing executive, author, and an instructor at Spirit Rock Meditation Center in Woodacre, California.

== Biography ==
Moffitt attended the University of Tennessee at Knoxville where in 1966 he helped found the Tennessee Intercollegiate State Legislature, an annual legislative session held by Tennessee college students. After graduating in 1971 with a M.S. in Economics, Moffitt co-founded 13-30 Corporation with Chris Whittle and was editor-in-chief and president from 1974-1983. In 1979, 13-30 Corporation purchased Esquire magazine and Moffitt was chief executive officer and editor-in-chief until 1987.

Deciding to begin a period of personal exploration that included studying mindfulness meditation and Theravada Buddhism, he sold Esquire to Hearst Magazines and left the publishing enterprise he created. In 2001, Moffitt was ordained to teach Vipassana meditation. His teaching is influenced by Ajahn Sumedho and his teacher Ajahn Chah. Moffitt is the founder of the Life Balance Institute, a non-profit organization dedicated to the study and practice of spiritual values in daily life. He also founded the Marin Sangha in San Rafael, California, and from 1998 until 2007 he was a contributing editor for Yoga Journal. Phillip is a member of the Guiding Teachers Council, and teaches regularly, at Spirit Rock Meditation Center in Woodacre, California.

He was identified by Yoga Journal as one of the people who had "each, independently, discovered the benefits of merging mindfulness with asana", leading to "something we might call 'mindful yoga'."

== Books ==
Emotional Chaos to Clarity: How to Live More Skillfully, Make Better Decisions, and Find Purpose in Life ISBN 1-59463-092-5

Dancing with Life: Buddhist Insights for Finding Meaning and Joy in the Face of Suffering ISBN 1-59486-353-9

The Power to Heal: Ancient Arts & Modern Medicine with Rick Smolan and Matthew Naythons ISBN 0-13-684549-5

Medicine’s Great Journey: One Hundred Years of Healing with Rick Smolan ISBN 0-8212-1987-1

Awakening through the Nine Bodies: Explorations in Consciousness for Mindfulness Meditation and Yoga Practitioners ISBN 1623171903

== See also ==
- Anne Cushman, who founded the first multi-year Buddhist meditation training for yoga teachers with Moffitt
