= Lucy's Record Shop =

Music venue in Nashville, Tennessee

- Logo of Lucy's Record Shop
- Address: 1707 Church St. Nashville, Tennessee; United States
- Owner: Mary Mancini
- Capacity: 200

Construction
- Opened: Summer 1992
- Closed: January 31, 1998

Lucy's Record Shop was an independent, locally owned record store and all-ages music venue in Nashville, Tennessee. During its five and a half years of operation, Lucy's supported a growing punk and indie music scene in Nashville, and received national publicity as a prominent underground music venue.

== History ==
Lucy's was originally opened as a record store called Revolutions Per Minute in the summer of 1992 by Mary Mancini. The store specialized in rock and punk music on independent labels. After being in business for a few months, the name was changed to Lucy's Record Shop (named after Mancini's dog, Lucy). In the same year, Donnie and April Kendall joined Mancini as partners in the business, and Lucy's started hosting live all-ages music shows in the spacious back room. Lucy's quickly became a popular hang-out for local teenagers and the focal point of the early 1990s punk scene in Nashville. Some of the notable local bands that often played at Lucy's include Lambchop, Fun Girls from Mt. Pilot, and the Teen Idols.

Lucy's closed on January 31, 1998. It was replaced by another all-ages music venue called Indienet Record Shop which featured punk and Christian music.

== In media ==
A documentary called Lucy Barks! was created by Stacy Goldate from footage of shows at Lucy's shot between 1994 and 1996. A low-budget independent movie called Half-Cocked also prominently features the venue.

In 2022, Mancini launched the Lucy's Record Shop Podcast to tell the stories behind the venue and explore the history of Nashville's underground music scene.
