= Amrit Desai =

Indian Hindu guru

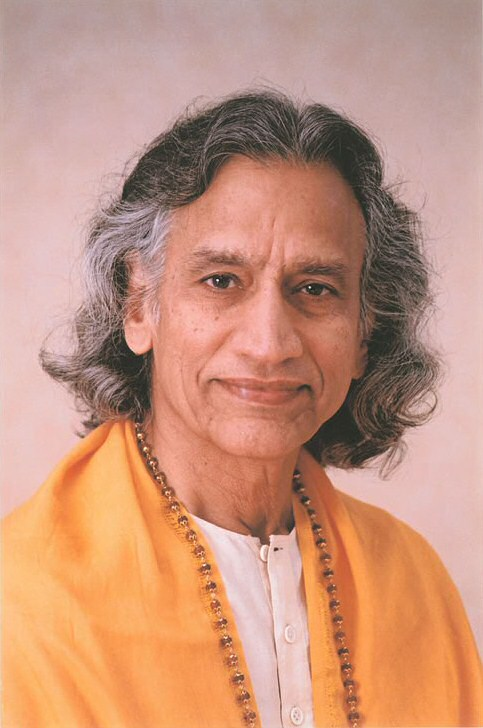
- Desai in 2016

Personal life
- Born: Amritlal C. Desai; 16 October 1932 Halol, Gujarat, India
- Spouse: Urmila Shah (Mataji)
- Children: Pragnesh, Kamini, Malay
- Notable work(s): Yoga of Relationships, Love and Bliss, Amrit Yoga and the Yoga Sutras

Religious life
- Religion: Hinduism
- Founder of: Amrit Yoga Institute and Kripalu Center
- Philosophy: Yoga

Religious career
- Teacher: Swami Kripalvananda

Amrit Desai is a yoga guru from India who helped introduce yoga to the West in the 1960s. He created Kripalu Yoga and I AM Yoga, and is the founder of several yoga and health centers in the US. In 1994 Desai admitted to sexual contact with at least three female resident disciples at the Kripalu Center and was forced to resign his position as Spiritual Director there.

Desai has been called "one of the most influential and sought-after figures in the development of Hatha Yoga in America over the last 40 years."

== Early life and education ==
Desai was born on 16 October 1932 in Pratappura in Gujarat, India to Chimanlal, a village merchant, and Buribhen Desa. At age ten, the family moved to Halol. At age 15, he encountered Swami Kripalvananda (Bapuji), a wandering Shaivite monk and kundalini yoga master

After studying engineering and training with the Indian Air Force in Madras, Desai returned to Halol where he took a job teaching art at the local high school. He married Urmila Shah in January 1955. The following year the couple moved to Ahmedabad, where he earned his art diploma over the next four years.

Desai traveled to the United States in February 1960 and entered the Philadelphia College of Art. His wife and infant son later joined him.

== Career ==
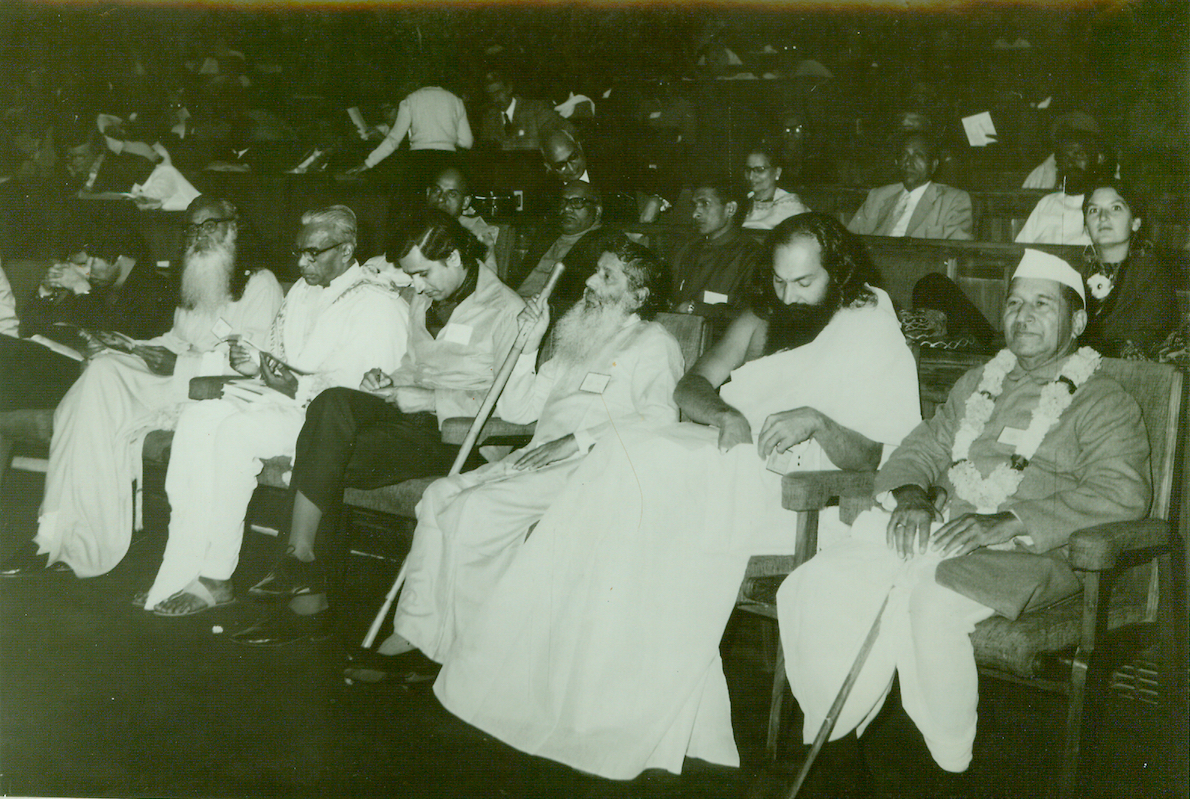
From left: Swami Satchidananda, B.K.S. Iyengar, Amrit Desai, Shri Kumar-swami, Swami Dhirendra Brahmachari, and B.I. Atreya at the World Conference on Scientific Yoga in New Delhi in 1970

In 1966, during his first visit to India since his arrival in the United States, Swami Kripalvananda gave him further instruction in kundalini yoga. In 1966 he formed The Yoga Society of Pennsylvania and taught yoga full-time. The Yoga Society of Pennsylvania was renamed the Kripalu Yoga Fellowship in 1972. By 1970, it had become one the largest yoga organisations at that time.

In 1970, Desai created a form of hatha yoga called Kripalu Yoga in honour of his guru. In 1972, the first Kripalu Ashram was founded in Sumneytown, Pennsylvania. In 1976, an additional ashram was opened in Summit Station, Pennsylvania; the residential staff grew to 150. In 1983, the Kripalu Center for Yoga and Health was founded in Lenox, MA.

By 1994, Kripalu Yoga teachers were teaching in 50 states and 45 countries, and it was described as the world's largest yoga and health center. The Amrit Yoga Institute in Salt Springs, Florida was founded in 2001.

== Sexual misconduct ==
The Kripalu Center for Yoga and Health was an Ashram. One of the spiritual practices that the single residents were expected to practice was celibacy (brahmacharya). Although sex within marriage was condoned at the ashram, after his third child was born in 1968, Desai declared that he would practice celibacy, and Kripalu held a large celebration. Residents were asked to report violators of the new celibacy code; violators were then expelled. Meanwhile Desai and a senior associate were themselves violating the code. In 1994 Desai admitted to sexual contact with at least three female resident disciples and was forced to resign his position as Spiritual Director. In an open letter to the Kripalu community, Desai stated "I deeply regret any suffering I have caused to the people directly involved and to the entire Kripalu family."

== Later years ==
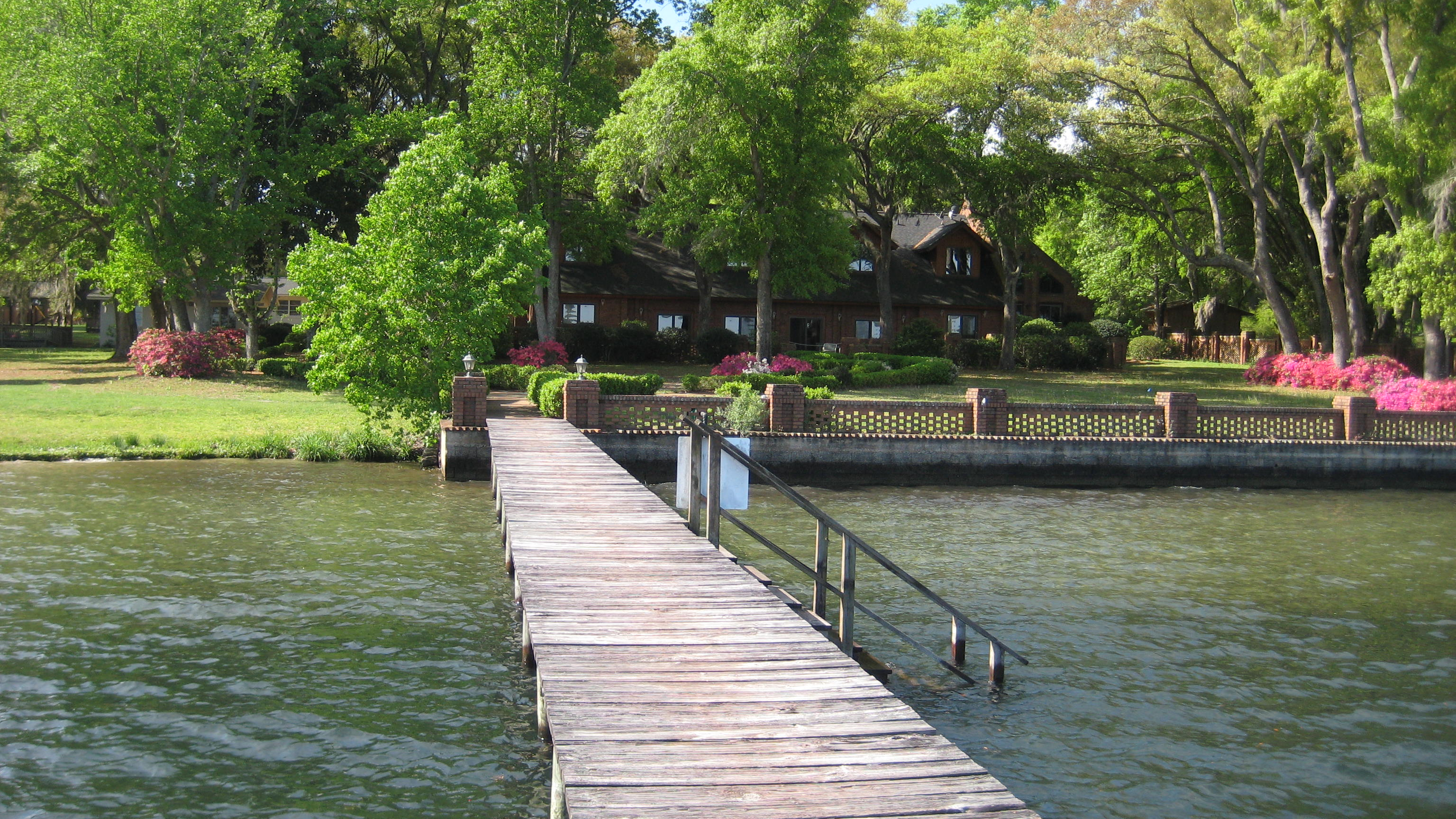
Amrit Yoga Institute in Salt Springs, Florida

In 1996, Desai resumed teaching at the original Kripalu Ashram in Sumneytown, Pennsylvania. Desai moved to Salt Springs, Florida in 2002 and taught at the Amrit Yoga Institute.

== Charitable work ==
Desai, through the Bhuriben Trust foundation, provided aid to Indians in need. He also secured medicine and medical treatment for those in need and aided the establishment of a new children’s school in Halol.
