= Kripalu Center =

Health and yoga retreat in Stockbridge, Massachusetts, US

Coordinates: 42.35°N 73.325°W

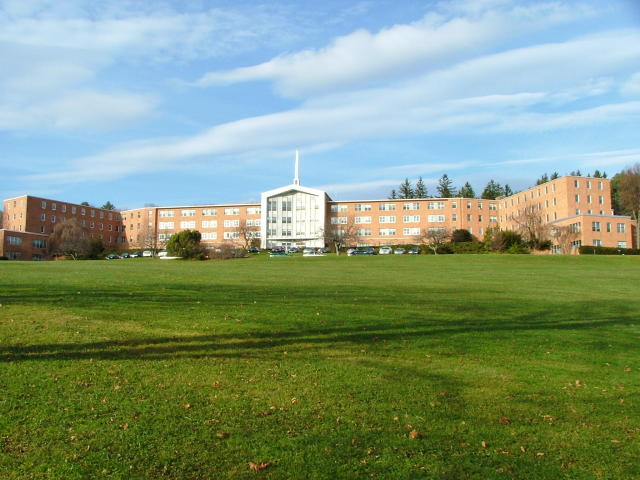
- Kripalu Center for Yoga & Health
- Interactive map of Kripalu Center
- Former names: Yoga Society of Pennsylvania
- Location: Stockbridge, Massachusetts
- Type: Retreat

Construction
- Opened: 1983

Website
- www.kripalu.org

The Kripalu Center for Yoga & Health is a nonprofit organization that operates a health and yoga retreat in Stockbridge, Massachusetts. Its 160,000-square-foot (15,000 m^{2}) facility is a former Jesuit novitiate and juniorate seminary built in 1957.

== History ==
In 1972, the modern yoga guru Amrit Desai set up a residential yoga center in Sumneytown, Pennsylvania. In 1974, the organization's name was changed to "Kripalu Yoga Fellowship". It taught Swami Kripalvananda's teachings, held retreats and other programs, and trained yoga teachers. In 1975, Kripalu bought Summit Station, Pennsylvania, including a health center that became a key element of its mission. In 1977, Swami Kripalu moved to the United States, inspiring many people to take up yoga. He returned to India in 1981. The current Stockbridge, Massachusetts location, a former Jesuit seminary on a property called Shadowbrook, opened in December 1983.

In 1994, it was discovered that Desai had had sexual relationships with female residents; he resigned. In 1999, Kripalu changed from a religious order to a secular non-profit organisation. Many of Kripalu's workshops are conducted by outside presenters, trained and certified by Kripalu. Among the center's offerings are a semester-long program for young adults, and projects in music, weight loss and post-traumatic stress disorder.

The center employed about 626 people as of 2008 and could accommodate more than 650 overnight guests. Kripalu's programs are hosted by its Schools of Yoga, Ayurveda, and Integrative Yoga Therapy; its Institute of Extraordinary Living, founded by Kripalu's scholar-in-residence Stephen Cope; and its conscious leadership program. Kripalu Center's 2019 revenue was $37.24 million. In 2020, Kripalu closed due to the COVID-19 pandemic, reopening in 2021.

== Kripalu Yoga ==
Kripalu Yoga is a form of yoga as exercise with elements of kundalini yoga that combines asanas, pranayama, and meditation. Kripalu states that its teaching is "following the flow" of prana, or "life-force energy, compassionate self-acceptance, observing the activity of the mind without judgment, and taking what is learned into daily life."

== Facility ==
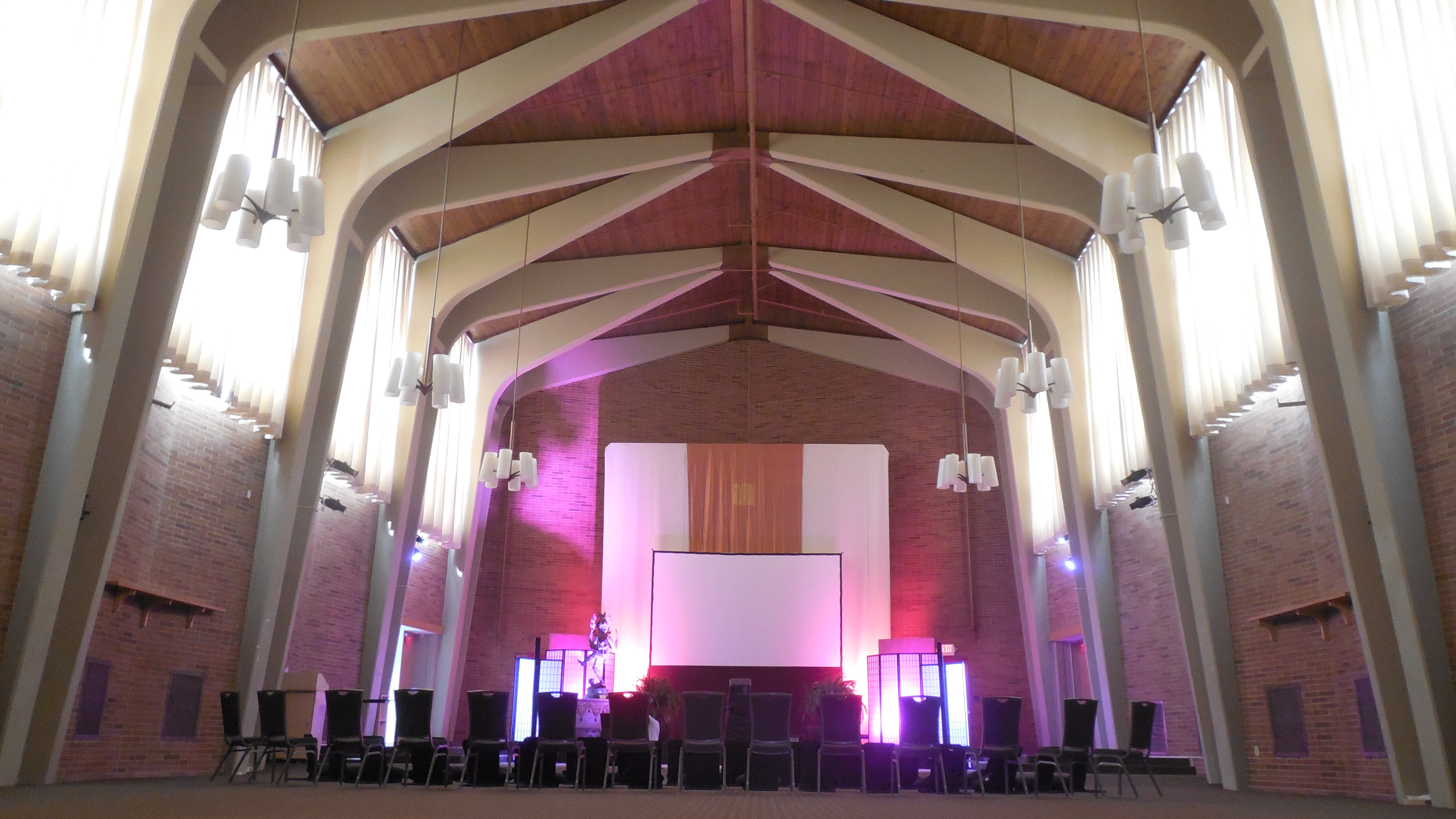
The Kripalu Center Main Hall, 2016

Kripalu's 100 acres (40 ha), include forests, lawns, gardens, and access to Lake Mahkeenac. Conservation easements on 225 of the acres were granted in 1997 using a framework of the U.S. Forest Legacy Program.

Kripalu's principal 160,000-square-foot (15,000 m^{2}) building was constructed by the Jesuits in 1957 to replace the Gilded Age mansion "Shadowbrook Cottage." The Jesuits had planned to demolish the mansion due to high maintenance costs, but prior to demolition, the mansion was destroyed by a fire in 1956 which resulted in several fatalities. Jesuits had acquired the former estate in 1922 as a place to train novitiates, but moved away in 1970. Kripalu formerly operated its own water supply using onsite wells.

A $15 million, six-story housing annex with 80 guest rooms, was completed in 2010. Designed by architect Peter Rose, it incorporates sustainable design elements and won a 2010 award from the American Institute of Architects. The building's landscaping was designed by the landscape architect Michael Van Valkenburgh. Harvard Magazine writes that the rooms are spare, "mostly white, and furnished with a simple desk and chair"; it disagrees with the description of the rooms as "weekend monks' cells". The rooms' plainness is set against the bright colors of Marimekko pillows.

== Reception ==
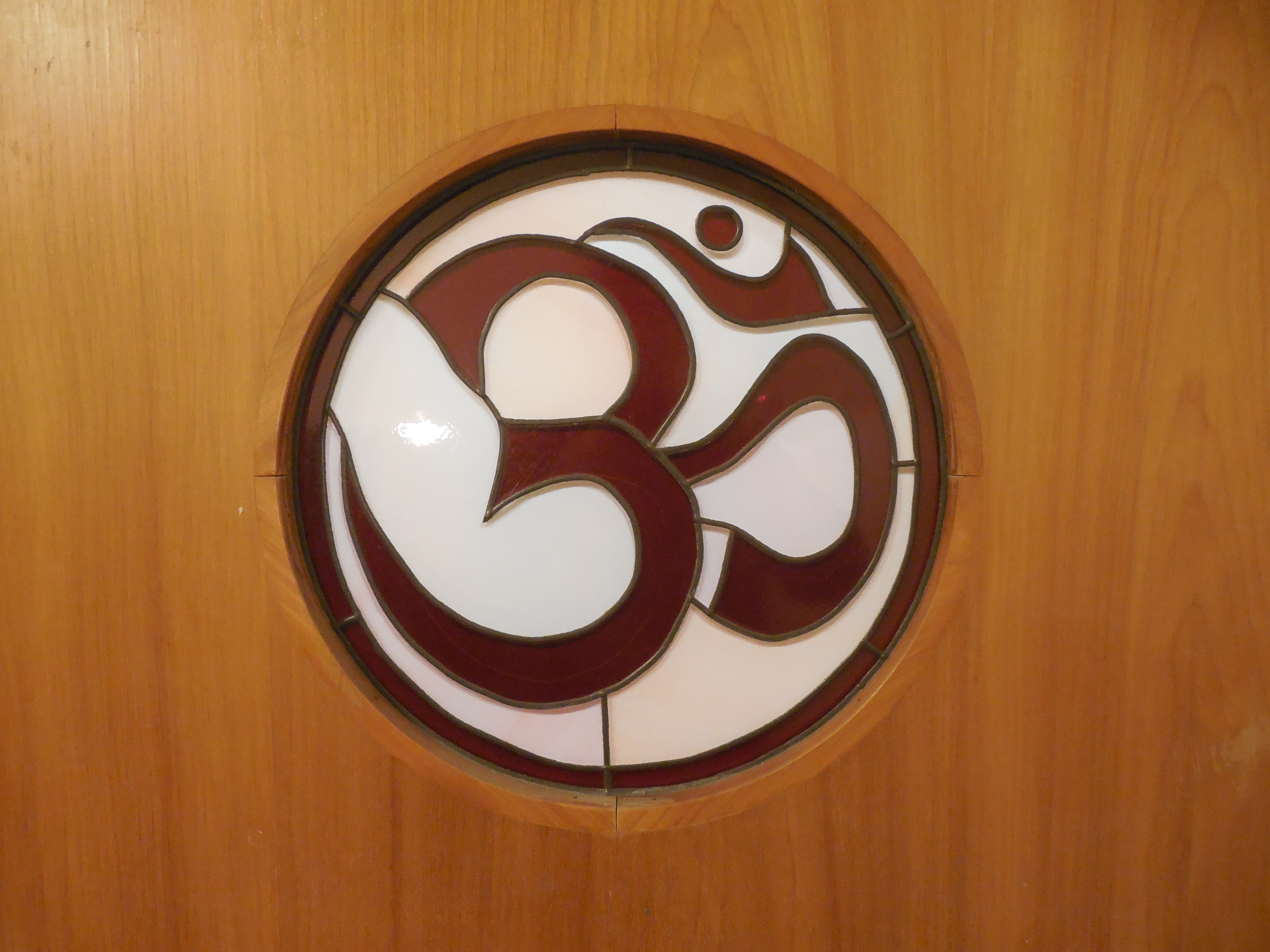
An Om symbol in stained glass at the main hall

Sally Lovett, writing in Condé Nast Traveller in 2013, summarized Kripalu as a "way-out, left-field yogic hub". She called it the biggest yoga retreat center in North America, with a "mixed bag" of guests from newbies to professionals. In her view, a visit would not be complete without joining in the daily session of dance at midday: she found it "surprisingly therapeutic freestyle dancing", and that the desire to join in overcomes the embarrassment. In her view the food, which she characterized as "root roasts, pulses, miso soup" was wholesome and plentiful, with macrobiotic options. She found the main meals "sociable affairs", though breakfast was silent. She recommended the "Healing Arts" spa with its herbal-oil therapy and "signature" deep-tissue massage.

Daniel MacGinn, in The Boston Globe in 2023, described a "wellness weekend" at the center, starting with a busy parking lot and a queue at the check-in counter. He chose a 2-day snowshoeing and yoga program, recommended by a colleague. He noted the contrast with the COVID-19 period, when the center laid off 450 of its 489 staff: it had by 2023 hired 337 staff, simplified its onsite offering, and increased its online services. MacGinn commented that Kripalu's "yoga, meditation, organic food" combination was moving from alternative to mainstream, but that its "rules and culture" would not suit everybody with no alcohol, no tobacco, deprecated cellphone use, and a lot of interest in natural history. He found some of the icebreaker exercises "cringey", and commented that "Jesuits and yogis share an austere design philosophy", such as bunks in shared dormitories. The snowshoeing was in a group of 10, with two guides, involving silent mindful walking and a stop for a tree meditation. Back at the center, the yoga was expertly led by an instructor with a "soothing and melodic" voice. The food was varied and "plant-forward" but there were chicken and shrimp dishes for the weekend's two dinners. Despite the high-fiber, low-sugar and low-fat diet, MacGinn enjoyed the food, finding that after a day, he noticed a different feeling in his body; and he found it liberating to experience activities without a cellphone in his pocket.

The Mindful Meditation website in 2024 praises Kripalu's yoga classes, writing that the instructors ensure that participants are comfortable doing no more than what feels right for them. It describes the food as excellent and the programs diverse, in an "impeccably clean and comfortable" facility with fine views of lake and mountains.
