= 111th Tennessee General Assembly =

2019–2021 Tennessee legislative term

111th Tennessee Legislative Assembly
←	110th General Assembly	112th General Assembly	→
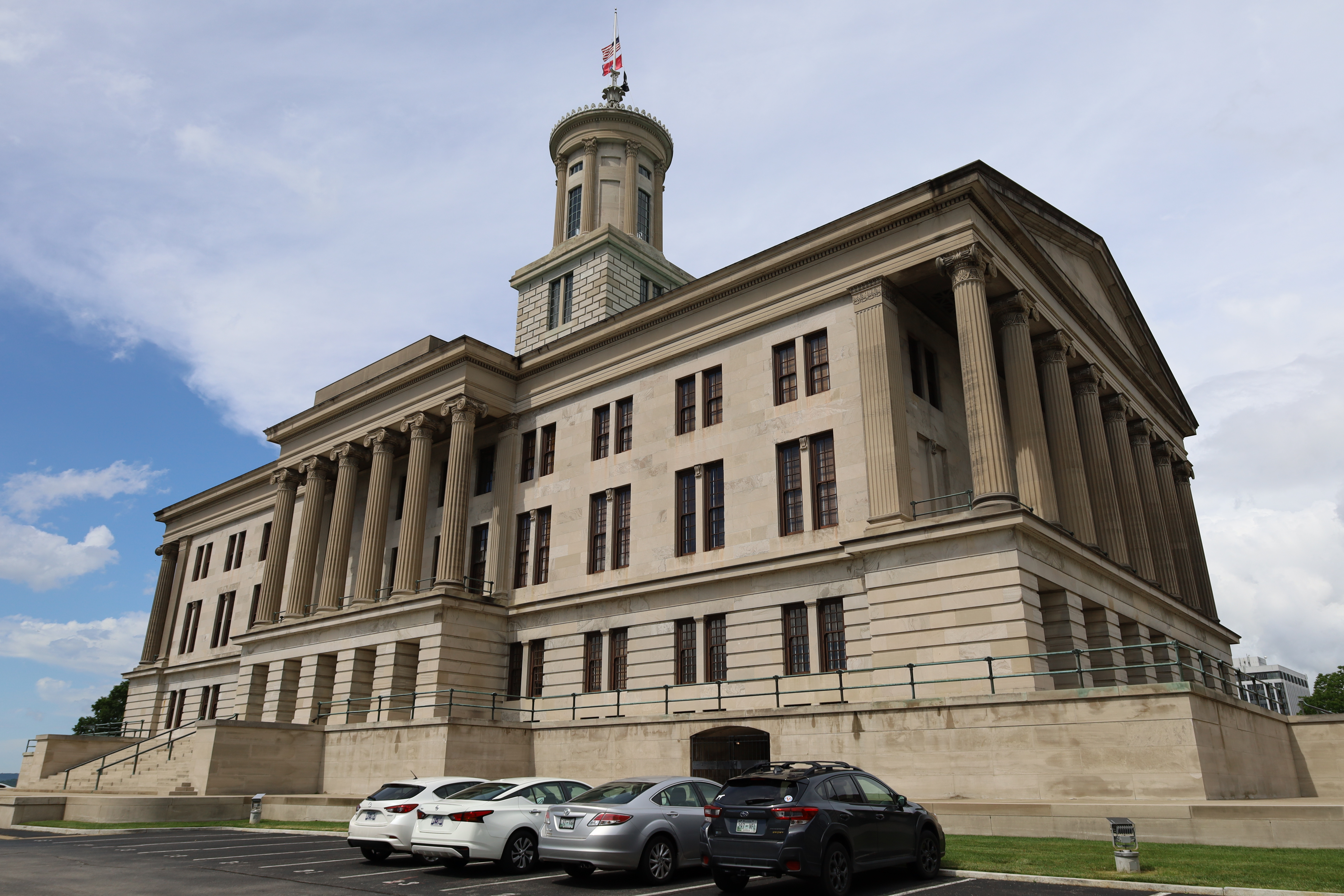
- The legislature took place in the Tennessee State Capitol, seen here in 2022

Overview
- Legislative body: Tennessee General Assembly
- Jurisdiction: Tennessee, United States
- Meeting place: Tennessee State Capitol
- Term: 2019

Tennessee State Senate
- Members: 33 Senators
- Senate President: Randy McNally (R)
- Majority Leader: Jack Johnson (R)
- Minority Leader: Jeff Yarbro (D)
- Party control: Republican Party of Tennessee

Tennessee House of Representatives
- Members: 99 Representatives
- Speaker of the House: Glen Casada (R); Bill Dunn (R) (as Speaker pro tempore); Cameron Sexton (R)
- Majority Leader: William Lamberth (R)
- Minority Leader: Karen Camper (D)
- Party control: Republican Party of Tennessee

The 111th Tennessee General Assembly was the gathering of the Tennessee General Assembly, consisting of the Tennessee Senate and Tennessee House of Representatives, meeting between January 2019 and January 2021.

== History ==
Members of the 111th General Assembly were chosen during Tennessee's 2018 House and Senate elections.

Lawmakers met for two regular sessions. The 2019 session of the Assembly ran through May 2. The 2020 session ran through June 19.

== Party summary ==
=== Senate party summary ===
Affiliation	Members
Democratic	5
Republican	27
Independent	1
Total	33

=== House party summary ===
Affiliation	Members
Democratic	26
Republican	73
Total	99

== Leadership ==
=== Senate leadership ===
==== Senate officers ====
- Lieutenant Governor and Speaker of the Senate: Randy McNally
- Speaker Pro Tempore of the Senate: Ferrell Haile
- Deputy Speakers of the Senate: Janice Bowling

==== Republican caucus leaders ====
- Republican Majority Leader: Jack Johnson
- Republican Caucus Chairman: Ken Yager
- Republican Caucus Treasurer: Ferrell Haile
- Republican Caucus Secretary: Dolores Gresham
- Republican Caucus Chaplain: Shane Reeves

==== Democratic caucus leaders ====
- Democratic Minority Leader: Jeff Yarbro
- Democratic Caucus Chairman: Raumesh Akbari

=== House leadership ===
==== House officers ====
- Speaker of the House: Cameron Sexton
- Speaker Pro Tempore of the House: Bill Dunn
- Deputy Speaker of the House: Curtis Johnson

==== Republican caucus leaders ====
- Republican Majority Leader: William Lamberth
  - Assistant Republican Leader: Ron Gant
- Republican Caucus Chairman: Jeremy Faison
  - Republican Caucus Vice-Chairman: Brandon Ogles
- Republican Floor Leader: Paul Sherrell
  - Republican Assistant Floor Leader: Chris Todd
- Republican Caucus Secretary: Clay Doggett
- Republican Caucus Treasurer: Mark Cochran

==== Democratic caucus leaders ====
- Democratic Leader: Karen Camper
  - Assistant Democratic Leader: Harold M. Love Jr.
- Democratic Leader Pro Tempore: John DeBerry
- Democratic Caucus Chairman: Mike Stewart
  - Democratic Caucus Vice-Chairman: Antonio Parkinson
- Democratic Whip: Jason Powell
- Democratic Floor Leader: Bill Beck
- Democratic Caucus Secretary: London Lamar
- Democratic Caucus Treasurer: Vincent Dixie

== Members ==
=== Senate ===
▌1. Steve Southerland (R)
▌2. Art Swann (R)
▌3. Rusty Crowe (R)
▌4. Jon Lundberg (R)
▌5. Randy McNally (R)
▌6. Becky Duncan Massey (R)
▌7. Richard Briggs (R)
▌8. Frank Niceley (R)
▌9. Mike Bell (R)
▌10. Todd Gardenhire (R)
▌11. Bo Watson (R)
▌12. Ken Yager (R)
▌13. Dawn White (R)
▌14. Shane Reeves (R)
▌15. Paul Bailey (R)
▌16. Janice Bowling (R)
▌17. Mark Pody (R)
▌18. Ferrell Haile (R)
▌19. Brenda Gilmore (D)
▌20. Steven Dickerson (R)
▌21. Jeff Yarbro (D)
▌22. Rosalind Kurita (I) (from January 18, 2019 to April 25, 2019) (Note: Former Democratic state senator Rosalind Kurita was appointed back to her old seat by the Montgomery County Commission after incumbent Mark Green resigned to take a seat in the United States House of Representatives. She was sworn in on January 18, 2019. She would later be succeeded by Bill Powers, who won the special election to complete the term.)

▌ Bill Powers (R) (from April 25, 2019)

▌23. Jack Johnson (R)
▌24. John Stevens (R)
▌25. Kerry Roberts (R)
▌26. Dolores Gresham (R)
▌27. Ed Jackson (R)
▌28. Joey Hensley (R)
▌29. Raumesh Akbari (D)
▌30. Sara Kyle (D)
▌31. Brian Kelsey (R)
▌32. Paul Rose (R)
▌33. Katrina Robinson (D)

=== House of Representatives ===
▌1. John Crawford (R)
▌2. Bud Hulsey (R)
▌3. Timothy Hill (R)
▌4. John Holsclaw Jr. (R)
▌5. David Hawk (R)
▌6. Micah Van Huss (R)
▌7. Matthew Hill (R)
▌8. Jerome Moon (R)
▌9. Gary Hicks (R)
▌10. Rick Eldridge (R)
▌11. Jeremy Faison (R)
▌12. Dale Carr (R)
▌13. Gloria Johnson (D)
▌14. Jason Zachary (R)
▌15. Rick Staples (D)
▌16. Bill Dunn (R)
▌17. Andrew Farmer (R)
▌18. Martin Daniel (R)
▌19. Dave Wright (R)
▌20. Bob Ramsey (R)
▌21. Lowell Russell (R)
▌22. Dan Howell (R)
▌23. Mark Cochran (R)
▌24. Mark Hall (R)
▌25. Cameron Sexton (R)
▌26. Robin Smith (R)
▌27. Patsy Hazlewood (R)
▌28. Yusuf Hakeem (D)
▌29. Mike Carter (R)
▌30. Esther Helton-Haynes (R)
▌31. Ron Travis (R)
▌32. Kent Calfee (R)
▌33. John Ragan (R)
▌34. Tim Rudd (R)
▌35. Jerry Sexton (R)
▌36. Dennis Powers (R)
▌37. Charlie Baum (R)
▌38. Kelly Keisling (R)
▌39. Iris Rudder (R)
▌40. Terri Lynn Weaver (R)
▌41. John Windle (D)
▌42. Ryan Williams (R)
▌43. Paul Sherrell (R)
▌44. William Lamberth (R)
▌45. Johnny Garrett (R)
▌46. Clark Boyd (R)
▌47. Rush Bricken (R)
▌48. Bryan Terry (R)
▌49. Mike Sparks (R)
▌50. Bo Mitchell (D)
▌51. Bill Beck (D)
▌52. Mike Stewart (D)
▌53. Jason Powell (D)
▌54. Vincent Dixie (D)
▌55. John Ray Clemmons (D)
▌56. Bob Freeman (D)
▌57. Susan Lynn (R)
▌58. Harold Love Jr. (D)
▌59. Jason Potts (D)
▌60. Darren Jernigan (D)
▌61. Brandon Ogles (R)
▌62. Pat Marsh (R)
▌63. Glen Casada (R)
▌64. Scott Cepicky (R)
▌65. Sam Whitson (R)
▌66. Sabi Kumar (R)
▌67. Jason Hodges (D)
▌68. Curtis Johnson (R)
▌69. Michael Curcio (R)
▌70. Clay Doggett (R)
▌71. David Byrd (R)
▌72. Kirk Haston (R)
▌73. Chris Todd (R)
▌74. Jay Reedy (R)
▌75. Bruce Griffey (R)
▌76. Andy Holt (R)
▌77. Bill Sanderson (R) (until July 24, 2019) (Note: Bill Sanderson resigned on July 24, 2019, citing his desire to spend more time with his family and on his business. Casey Hood was appointed to fill the seat until a special election. Rusty Grills won the election and was sworn in on January 14, 2020.)

▌ Casey Hood (R) (from August 2019 to January 14, 2020)
▌ Rusty Grills (R) (from January 14, 2020)

▌78. Mary Littleton (R)
▌79. Curtis Halford (R)
▌80. Johnny Shaw (D)
▌81. Debra Moody (R)
▌82. Chris Hurt (R)
▌83. Mark White (R)
▌84. Joe Towns (D)
▌85. Jesse Chism (D)
▌86. Barbara Cooper (D)
▌87. Karen Camper (D)
▌88. Larry Miller (D)
▌89. Justin Lafferty (R)
▌▌90. John DeBerry (D, then I) (Note: Longtime representative John DeBerry was removed from the Democratic primary ballot by the Tennessee Democratic Party's State Executive Committee during his re-election bid. He later filed to run as an independent.)
▌91. London Lamar (D)
▌92. Rick Tillis (R)
▌93. G. A. Hardaway (D)
▌94. Ron Gant (R)
▌95. Kevin Vaughan (R)
▌96. Dwayne Thompson (D)
▌97. Jim Coley (R)
▌98. Antonio Parkinson (D)
▌99. Tom Leatherwood (R)

== See also ==
- List of Tennessee General Assemblies
