= 112th Tennessee General Assembly =

2021–2023 Tennessee legislative term

112th Tennessee Legislative Assembly
←	111th General Assembly	113th General Assembly	→
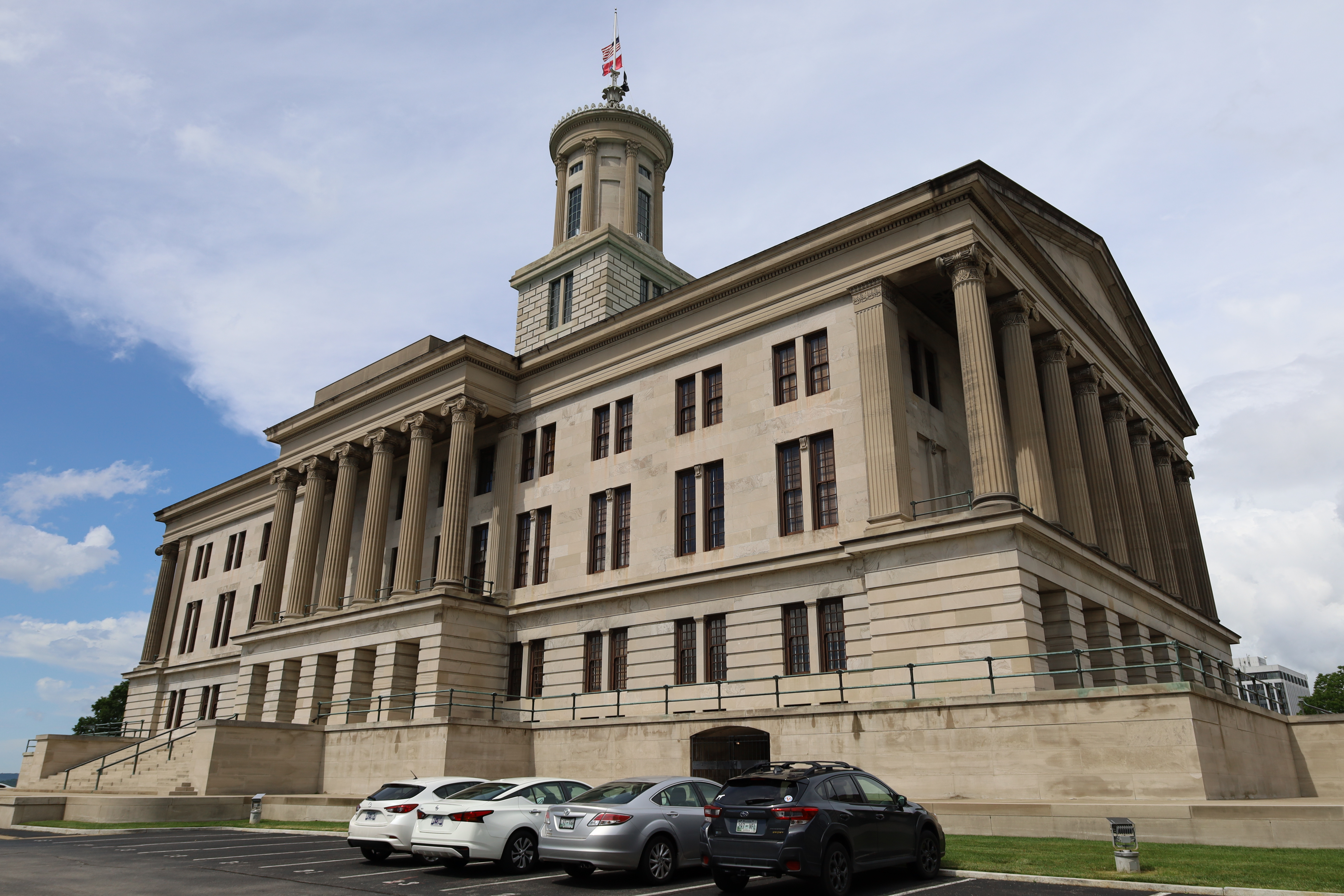
- The legislature took place in the Tennessee State Capitol, seen here in 2022

Overview
- Legislative body: Tennessee General Assembly
- Jurisdiction: Tennessee, United States
- Meeting place: Tennessee State Capitol
- Term: 2021

Tennessee State Senate
- Members: 33 Senators
- Senate President: Randy McNally (R)
- Majority Leader: Jack Johnson (R)
- Minority Leader: Jeff Yarbro (D)
- Party control: Republican Party of Tennessee

Tennessee House of Representatives
- Members: 99 Representatives
- Speaker of the House: Cameron Sexton (R)
- Majority Leader: William Lamberth (R)
- Minority Leader: Karen Camper (D)
- Party control: Republican Party of Tennessee

The 112th Tennessee General Assembly was the gathering of the Tennessee General Assembly, consisting of the Tennessee Senate and Tennessee House of Representatives, meeting between January 2021 and January 2023.

== History ==
Members of the 112th General Assembly were chosen during Tennessee's 2020 House and Senate elections.

Lawmakers met for two regular sessions. The first regular session ran through May 5, 2021. The second session ran through April 28, 2022. Lawmakers also convened for three separate extraordinary sessions over the two-year term.

== Party summary ==
=== Senate party summary ===
Affiliation	Members
Democratic	6
Republican	27
Total	33

=== House party summary ===
Affiliation	Members
Democratic	26
Republican	73
Total	99

== Leadership ==
=== Senate leadership ===
==== Senate officers ====
- Lieutenant Governor and Speaker of the Senate: Randy McNally
- Speaker Pro Tempore of the Senate: Ferrell Haile
- Deputy Speakers of the Senate: Janice Bowling and Jon Lundberg

==== Republican caucus leaders ====
- Republican Majority Leader: Jack Johnson
- Republican Caucus Chairman: Ken Yager
- Republican Caucus Treasurer: Ferrell Haile
- Republican Caucus Secretary: Dawn White
- Republican Caucus Chaplain: Shane Reeves

==== Democratic caucus leaders ====
- Democratic Minority Leader: Jeff Yarbro
- Democratic Caucus Chairman: Raumesh Akbari

=== House leadership ===
==== House officers ====
- Speaker of the House: Cameron Sexton
- Speaker Pro Tempore of the House: Pat Marsh
- Deputy Speaker of the House: Curtis Johnson

==== Republican caucus leaders ====
- Republican Majority Leader: William Lamberth
  - Assistant Republican Leader: Ron Gant
- Republican Caucus Chairman: Jeremy Faison
  - Republican Caucus Vice-Chairman: Brandon Ogles
- Republican Whip: Johnny Garrett
- Republican Floor Leader: Paul Sherrell
  - Republican Assistant Floor Leader: Scotty Campbell
- Republican Caucus Secretary: Michele Carringer
- Republican Caucus Treasurer: Mark Cochran

==== Democratic caucus leaders ====
- Democratic Leader: Karen Camper
  - Assistant Democratic Leader: Harold M. Love Jr.
- Democratic Leader Pro Tempore: Larry Miller
- Democratic Caucus Chairman: Vincent Dixie
  - Democratic Caucus Vice-Chairman: Bob Freeman
- Democratic Whip: Jason Powell
- Democratic Floor Leader: Bill Beck
- Democratic Caucus Secretary: London Lamar
- Democratic Caucus Treasurer: Jesse Chism

== Members ==
=== Senate ===
▌1. Steve Southerland (R)
▌2. Art Swann (R)
▌3. Rusty Crowe (R)
▌4. Jon Lundberg (R)
▌5. Randy McNally (R)
▌6. Becky Duncan Massey (R)
▌7. Richard Briggs (R)
▌8. Frank Niceley (R)
▌9. Mike Bell (R) (until August 31, 2022) (Note: Mike Bell resigned from office on August 31, 2022, to take a job with the Tennessee Wildlife Resources Agency. David Crews, appointed to the seat by the McMinn County Commission, was sworn in to finish the term on September 21, 2022.)

▌ David Crews (R) (from September 21, 2022)

▌10. Todd Gardenhire (R)
▌11. Bo Watson (R)
▌12. Ken Yager (R)
▌13. Dawn White (R)
▌14. Shane Reeves (R)
▌15. Paul Bailey (R)
▌16. Janice Bowling (R)
▌17. Mark Pody (R)
▌18. Ferrell Haile (R)
▌19. Brenda Gilmore (D)
▌20. Heidi Campbell (D)
▌21. Jeff Yarbro (D)
▌22. Bill Powers (R)
▌23. Jack Johnson (R)
▌24. John Stevens (R)
▌25. Kerry Roberts (R)
▌26. Page Walley (R)
▌27. Ed Jackson (R)
▌28. Joey Hensley (R)
▌29. Raumesh Akbari (D)
▌30. Sara Kyle (D)
▌31. Brian Kelsey (R)
▌32. Paul Rose (R)
▌33. Katrina Robinson (D) (until February 2, 2022) (Note: Katrina Robinson was expelled from office on February 2, 2022, after being indicted on 48 embezzlement-related criminal charges. London Lamar, appointed to the seat by the Shelby County Commission, was sworn into office on March 7, 2022.)

▌ London Lamar (D) (from March 7, 2022)

=== House of Representatives ===
▌1. John Crawford (R)
▌2. Bud Hulsey (R)
▌3. Scotty Campbell (R)
▌4. John Holsclaw Jr. (R)
▌5. David Hawk (R)
▌6. Tim Hicks (R)
▌7. Rebecca Alexander (R)
▌8. Jerome Moon (R)
▌9. Gary Hicks (R)
▌10. Rick Eldridge (R)
▌11. Jeremy Faison (R)
▌12. Dale Carr (R)
▌13. Gloria Johnson (D)
▌14. Jason Zachary (R)
▌15. Sam McKenzie (D)
▌16. Michele Carringer (R)
▌17. Andrew Farmer (R)
▌18. Eddie Mannis (R)
▌19. Dave Wright (R)
▌20. Bob Ramsey (R)
▌21. Lowell Russell (R)
▌22. Dan Howell (R)
▌23. Mark Cochran (R)
▌24. Mark Hall (R)
▌25. Cameron Sexton (R)
▌26. Robin Smith (R) (until March 7, 2022) (Note: Robin Smith resigned her seat on March 7, 2022, before pleading guilty to one charge of honest services fraud. Greg Martin, appointed to the seat by the Hamilton County Commission, was sworn into office on April 4, 2022.)

▌ Greg Martin (R) (from April 4, 2022)

▌27. Patsy Hazlewood (R)
▌28. Yusuf Hakeem (D)
▌29. Mike Carter (R) (until May 15, 2021) (Note: Mike Carter died on May 15, 2021. His wife Joan was sworn into office on an interim basis by the Hamilton County Commission on June 15, 2021. Greg Vital was later sworn in on October 12, 2021, after winning the special election to finish the term.)

▌ Joan Carter (R) (from June 15, 2021 to October 12, 2021)
▌ Greg Vital (R) (from October 12, 2021)

▌30. Esther Helton-Haynes (R)
▌31. Ron Travis (R)
▌32. Kent Calfee (R)
▌33. John Ragan (R)
▌34. Tim Rudd (R)
▌35. Jerry Sexton (R)
▌36. Dennis Powers (R)
▌37. Charlie Baum (R)
▌38. Kelly Keisling (R)
▌39. Iris Rudder (R)
▌40. Terri Lynn Weaver (R)
▌▌41. John Windle (D, then I) (Note: In 2022, Windle filed to run for re-election as an independent.)
▌42. Ryan Williams (R)
▌43. Paul Sherrell (R)
▌44. William Lamberth (R)
▌45. Johnny Garrett (R)
▌46. Clark Boyd (R)
▌47. Rush Bricken (R)
▌48. Bryan Terry (R)
▌49. Mike Sparks (R)
▌50. Bo Mitchell (D)
▌51. Bill Beck (D)
▌52. Mike Stewart (D)
▌53. Jason Powell (D)
▌54. Vincent Dixie (D)
▌55. John Ray Clemmons (D)
▌56. Bob Freeman (D)
▌57. Susan Lynn (R)
▌58. Harold Love Jr. (D)
▌59. Jason Potts (D)
▌60. Darren Jernigan (D)
▌61. Brandon Ogles (R)
▌62. Pat Marsh (R)
▌63. Glen Casada (R)
▌64. Scott Cepicky (R)
▌65. Sam Whitson (R)
▌66. Sabi Kumar (R)
▌67. Jason Hodges (D)
▌68. Curtis Johnson (R)
▌69. Michael Curcio (R) (until June 2022) (Note: Michael Curcio resigned from the legislature to pursue work as a lobbyist. Brian Ragan, appointed to the seat by the Hamilton County Commission on June 20, 2022, was later sworn into office.)

▌ Brian Ragan (I) (appointed June 20, 2022)

▌70. Clay Doggett (R)
▌71. David Byrd (R)
▌72. Kirk Haston (R)
▌73. Chris Todd (R)
▌74. Jay Reedy (R)
▌75. Bruce Griffey (R)
▌76. Tandy Darby (R)
▌77. Rusty Grills (R)
▌78. Mary Littleton (R)
▌79. Curtis Halford (R)
▌80. Johnny Shaw (D)
▌81. Debra Moody (R)
▌82. Chris Hurt (R)
▌83. Mark White (R)
▌84. Joe Towns (D)
▌85. Jesse Chism (D)
▌86. Barbara Cooper (D)
▌87. Karen Camper (D)
▌88. Larry Miller (D)
▌89. Justin Lafferty (R)
▌90. Torrey Harris (D)
▌91. London Lamar (D)
▌92. Todd Warner (R)
▌93. G. A. Hardaway (D)
▌94. Ron Gant (R)
▌95. Kevin Vaughan (R)
▌96. Dwayne Thompson (D)
▌97. John Gillespie (R)
▌98. Antonio Parkinson (D)
▌99. Tom Leatherwood (R)

== See also ==
- List of Tennessee General Assemblies
