= 113th Tennessee General Assembly =

2023–2025 Tennessee legislative term

113th Tennessee Legislative Assembly
←	112th General Assembly	114th General Assembly	→
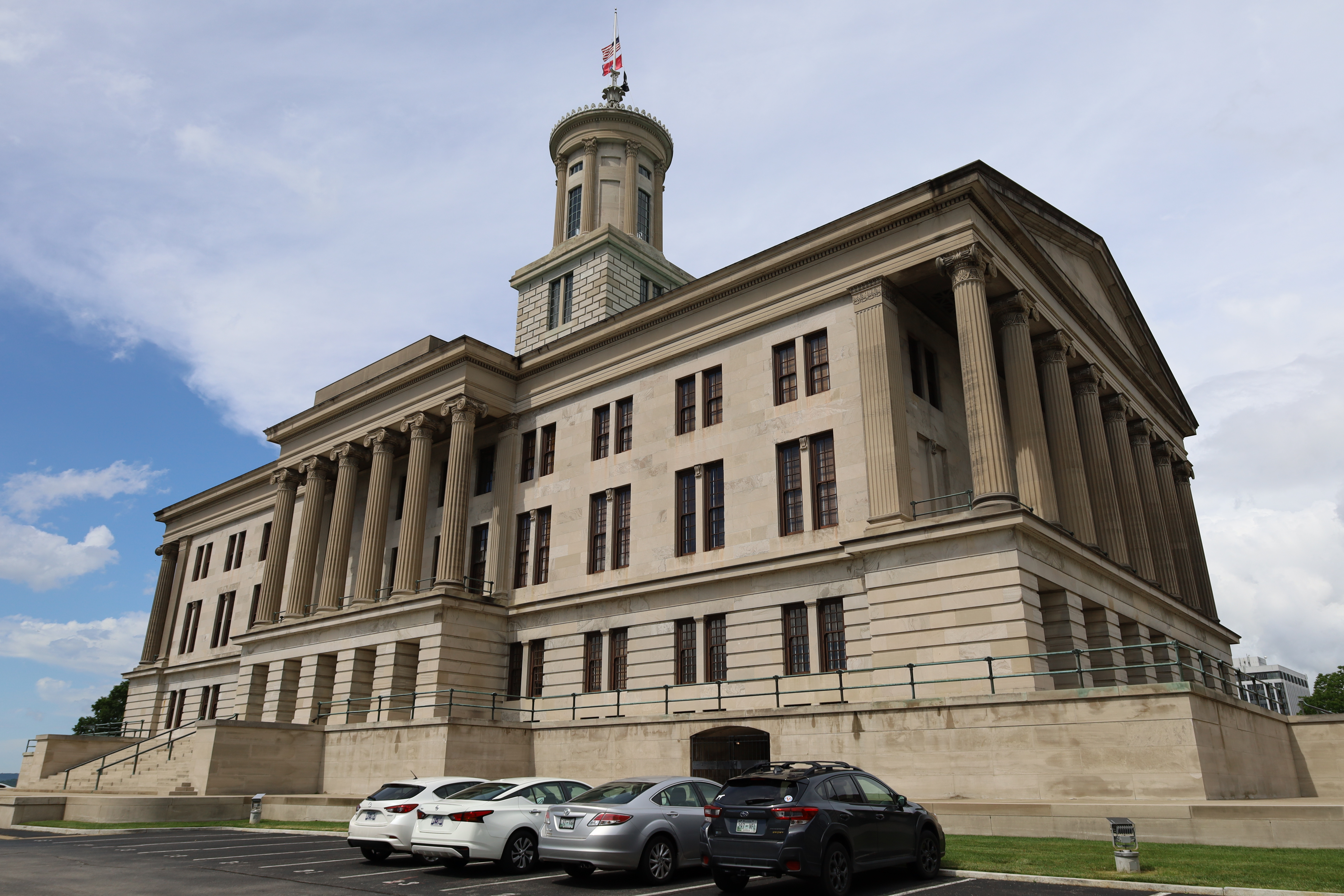
- The legislature took place in the Tennessee State Capitol, seen here in 2022

Overview
- Legislative body: Tennessee General Assembly
- Jurisdiction: Tennessee, United States
- Meeting place: Tennessee State Capitol
- Term: 2023

Tennessee State Senate
- Members: 33 Senators
- Senate President: Randy McNally (R)
- Majority Leader: Jack Johnson (R)
- Minority Leader: Raumesh Akbari (D)
- Party control: Republican Party of Tennessee

Tennessee House of Representatives
- Members: 99 Representatives
- Speaker of the House: Cameron Sexton (R)
- Majority Leader: William Lamberth (R)
- Minority Leader: Karen Camper (D)
- Party control: Republican Party of Tennessee

The 113th Tennessee General Assembly was the gathering of the Tennessee General Assembly, consisting of the Tennessee Senate and Tennessee House of Representatives, meeting between January 2023 and January 2025.

== History ==
Members of the 113th General Assembly were chosen during Tennessee's 2022 House and Senate elections. On January 11, 2023, lawmakers convened for their first regular session. On April 26, 2024, they adjourned their second regular session.

== Party summary ==
=== Senate party summary ===
Senate composition by district Held by Democrats Held by Republicans

Affiliation	Members
Democratic	6
Republican	27
Total	33

=== House party summary ===
House composition by district Held by Democrats Held by Republicans

Affiliation	Members
Democratic	24
Republican	75
Total	99

== Leadership ==
=== Senate leadership ===
==== Senate officers ====
- Lieutenant Governor and Speaker of the Senate: Randy McNally
- Speaker Pro Tempore of the Senate: Ferrell Haile
- Deputy Speakers of the Senate: Shane Reeves, John Stevens, and Dawn White

==== Republican caucus leaders ====
- Republican Majority Leader: Jack Johnson
- Republican Caucus Chairman: Ken Yager
- Republican Caucus Treasurer: Ferrell Haile
- Republican Caucus Secretary: Dawn White
- Republican Caucus Chaplain: Shane Reeves

==== Democratic caucus leaders ====
- Democratic Minority Leader: Raumesh Akbari
- Democratic Caucus Chairman: London Lamar

=== House leadership ===
==== House officers ====
- Speaker of the House: Cameron Sexton
- Speaker Pro Tempore of the House: Pat Marsh
- Deputy Speaker of the House: Curtis Johnson

==== Republican caucus leaders ====
- Republican Majority Leader: William Lamberth
  - Assistant Republican Leader: Mark Cochran
- Republican Caucus Chairman: Jeremy Faison
  - Republican Caucus Vice-Chairman: Tim Hicks
- Republican Whip: Johnny Garrett
- Republican Floor Leader: Paul Sherrell
  - Republican Assistant Floor Leader: Jody Barrett
- Republican Caucus Secretary: Kip Capley
- Republican Caucus Treasurer: Rebecca Alexander

==== Democratic caucus leaders ====
- Democratic Leader: Karen Camper
  - Assistant Democratic Leader: Harold M. Love Jr.
- Democratic Leader Pro Tempore: Larry Miller
- Democratic Caucus Chairman: John Ray Clemmons
  - Democratic Caucus Vice-Chairman: Bob Freeman
- Democratic Whip: Jason Powell
- Democratic Floor Leader: Bill Beck
  - Democratic Assistant Floor Leader: Justin Jones
- Democratic Caucus Secretary: Ronnie Glynn
- Democratic Caucus Treasurer: Gloria Johnson

== Members ==
=== Senate ===
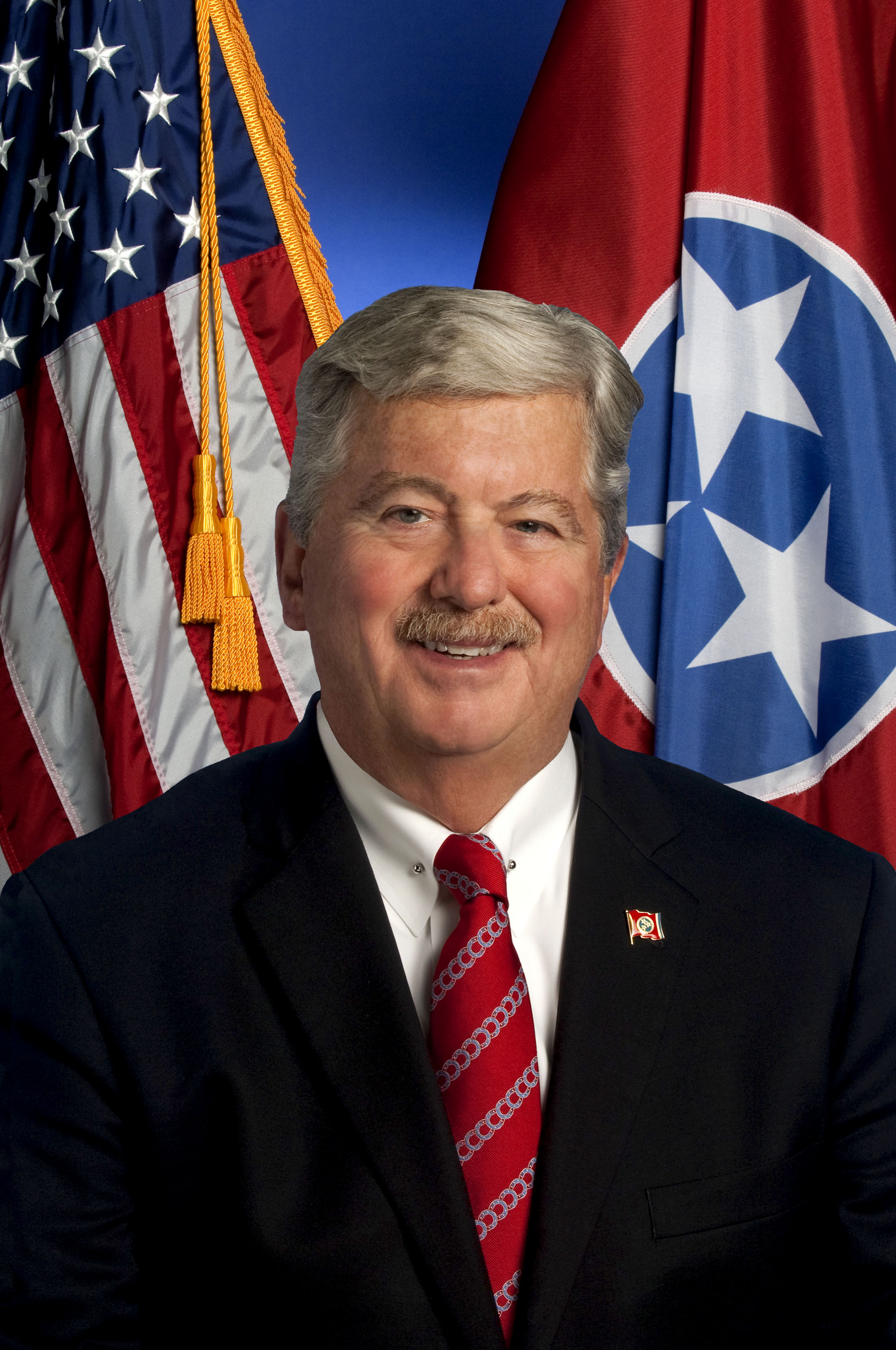
Lieutenant Governor of Tennessee Speaker of the Tennessee Senate Randy McNally (R-5)

▌1. Adam Lowe (R)
▌2. Art Swann (R)
▌3. Rusty Crowe (R)
▌4. Jon Lundberg (R)
▌5. Randy McNally (R)
▌6. Becky Duncan Massey (R)
▌7. Richard Briggs (R)
▌8. Frank Niceley (R)
▌9. Steve Southerland (R)
▌10. Todd Gardenhire (R)
▌11. Bo Watson (R)
▌12. Ken Yager (R)
▌13. Dawn White (R)
▌14. Shane Reeves (R)
▌15. Paul Bailey (R)
▌16. Janice Bowling (R)
▌17. Mark Pody (R)
▌18. Ferrell Haile (R)
▌19. Charlane Oliver (D)
▌20. Heidi Campbell (D)
▌21. Jeff Yarbro (D)
▌22. Bill Powers (R)
▌23. Kerry Roberts (R)
▌24. John Stevens (R)
▌25. Ed Jackson (R)
▌26. Page Walley (R)
▌27. Jack Johnson (R)
▌28. Joey Hensley (R)
▌29. Raumesh Akbari (D)
▌30. Sara Kyle (D)
▌31. Brent Taylor (R)
▌32. Paul Rose (R)
▌33. London Lamar (D)

=== House of Representatives ===
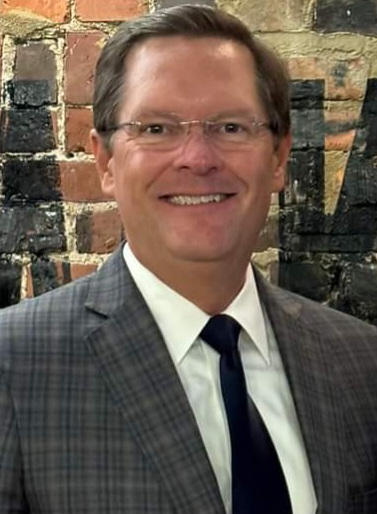
Speaker of the Tennessee House of Representatives Cameron Sexton (R-25)

▌1. John Crawford (R)
▌2. Bud Hulsey (R)
▌3. Scotty Campbell (R) (until April 20, 2023) (Note: Scotty Campbell resigned his seat on April 20, 2023, after a committee concluded he had violated the rules of the Tennessee General Assembly, including by sexually harassing an intern. The Johnson County Commission appointed former representative Timothy Hill to the seat.)

▌ Timothy Hill (R) (from May 11, 2023)

▌4. John Holsclaw Jr. (R)
▌5. David Hawk (R)
▌6. Tim Hicks (R)
▌7. Rebecca Alexander (R)
▌8. Jerome Moon (R)
▌9. Gary Hicks (R)
▌10. Rick Eldridge (R)
▌11. Jeremy Faison (R)
▌12. Dale Carr (R)
▌13. Robert Stevens (R)
▌14. Jason Zachary (R)
▌15. Sam McKenzie (D)
▌16. Michele Carringer (R)
▌17. Andrew Farmer (R)
▌18. Elaine Davis (R)
▌19. Dave Wright (R)
▌20. Bryan Richey (R)
▌21. Lowell Russell (R)
▌22. Dan Howell (R)
▌23. Mark Cochran (R)
▌24. Kevin Raper (R)
▌25. Cameron Sexton (R)
▌26. Greg Martin (R)
▌27. Patsy Hazlewood (R)
▌28. Yusuf Hakeem (D)
▌29. Greg Vital (R)
▌30. Esther Helton-Haynes (R)
▌31. Ron Travis (R)
▌32. Monty Fritts (R)
▌33. John Ragan (R)
▌34. Tim Rudd (R)
▌35. William Slater (R)
▌36. Dennis Powers (R)
▌37. Charlie Baum (R)
▌38. Kelly Keisling (R)
▌39. Iris Rudder (R)
▌40. Michael Hale (R)
▌41. Ed Butler (R)
▌42. Ryan Williams (R)
▌43. Paul Sherrell (R)
▌44. William Lamberth (R)
▌45. Johnny Garrett (R)
▌46. Clark Boyd (R)
▌47. Rush Bricken (R)
▌48. Bryan Terry (R)
▌49. Mike Sparks (R)
▌50. Bo Mitchell (D)
▌51. Bill Beck (D) (until June 4, 2023) (Note: Bill Beck died on June 4, 2023. The Metro Nashville Council appointed former councilor Anthony Davis to the seat on an interim basis. Aftyn Behn was sworn in on October 4, 2023 after she won a special election to finish the remainder of the term.)

▌ Anthony Davis (D) (from June 20, 2023 to October 4, 2023)
▌ Aftyn Behn (D) (from October 4, 2023)

▌52. Justin Jones (D) (until April 6, 2023) (Note: On April 6, 2023, Justin Jones and Justin Pearson were expelled from the Tennessee House of Representatives for violating the chamber's decorum rules; each was reappointed to their previous seat within days by the Metro Nashville Council and the Shelby County Board of Commissioners respectively.)

▌ Justin Jones (D) (from April 10, 2023)

▌53. Jason Powell (D)
▌54. Vincent Dixie (D)
▌55. John Ray Clemmons (D)
▌56. Bob Freeman (D)
▌57. Susan Lynn (R)
▌58. Harold Love Jr. (D)
▌59. Caleb Hemmer (D)
▌60. Darren Jernigan (D)
▌61. Gino Bulso (R)
▌62. Pat Marsh (R)
▌63. Jake McCalmon (R)
▌64. Scott Cepicky (R)
▌65. Sam Whitson (R)
▌66. Sabi Kumar (R)
▌67. Ronnie Glynn (D)
▌68. Curtis Johnson (R)
▌69. Jody Barrett (R)
▌70. Clay Doggett (R)
▌71. Kip Capley (R)
▌72. Kirk Haston (R)
▌73. Chris Todd (R)
▌74. Jay Reedy (R)
▌75. Jeff Burkhart (R)
▌76. Tandy Darby (R)
▌77. Rusty Grills (R)
▌78. Mary Littleton (R)
▌79. Brock Martin (R)
▌80. Johnny Shaw (D)
▌81. Debra Moody (R)
▌82. Chris Hurt (R)
▌83. Mark White (R)
▌84. Joe Towns (D)
▌85. Jesse Chism (D)
▌86. Justin Pearson (D) (from February 9, 2023 until April 6, 2023) (Note: The district's previous representative, Barbara Cooper had died on October 25, 2022, and won the regular election posthumously. Justin Pearson won the special election to succeed her and was sworn into office on February 9, 2023.)

▌ Justin Pearson (D) (from April 12, 2023)

▌87. Karen Camper (D)
▌88. Larry Miller (D)
▌89. Justin Lafferty (R)
▌90. Gloria Johnson (D)
▌91. Torrey Harris (D)
▌92. Todd Warner (R)
▌93. G. A. Hardaway (D)
▌94. Ron Gant (R)
▌95. Kevin Vaughan (R)
▌96. Dwayne Thompson (D)
▌97. John Gillespie (R)
▌98. Antonio Parkinson (D)
▌99. Tom Leatherwood (R)

== See also ==
- List of Tennessee General Assemblies
