= 110th Tennessee General Assembly =

2017–2019 Tennessee legislative term

110th Tennessee Legislative Assembly
←	109th General Assembly	111th General Assembly	→
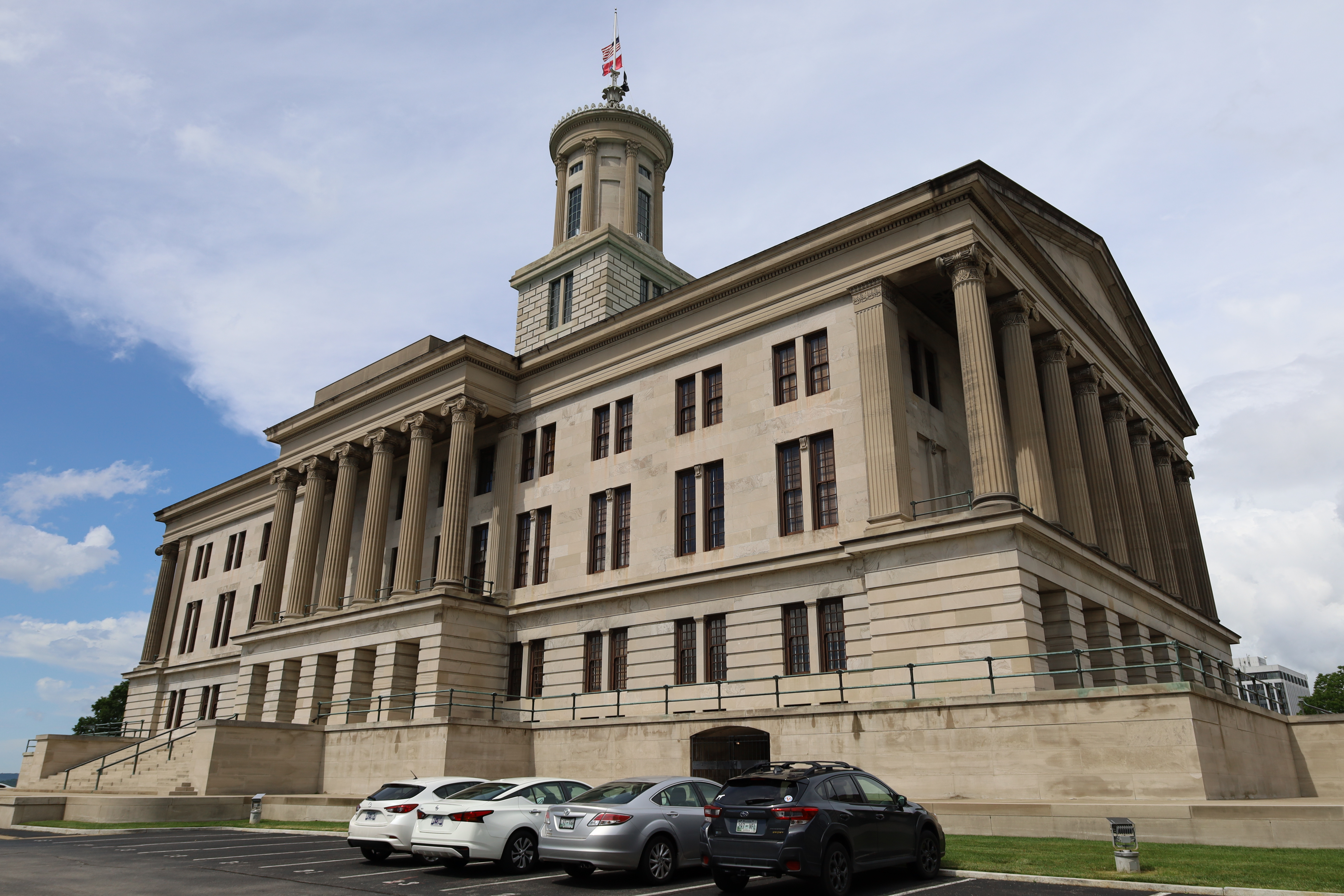
- The legislature took place in the Tennessee State Capitol, seen here in 2022

Overview
- Legislative body: Tennessee General Assembly
- Jurisdiction: Tennessee, United States
- Meeting place: Tennessee State Capitol
- Term: 2017–2019

Tennessee State Senate
- Members: 33 Senators
- Speaker of the Senate: Randy McNally (R)
- Majority Leader: Mark Norris (R)
- Minority Leader: Lee Harris (D)
- Party control: Republican Party of Tennessee

Tennessee House of Representatives
- Members: 99 Representatives
- Speaker of the House: Beth Harwell (R)
- Majority Leader: Glen Casada (R)
- Minority Leader: Craig Fitzhugh (D)
- Party control: Republican Party of Tennessee

The 110th Tennessee General Assembly was the gathering of the Tennessee General Assembly, consisting of the Tennessee Senate and Tennessee House of Representatives, meeting between January 2017 and January 2019.

== History ==
Members of the 110th General Assembly were chosen during Tennessee's 2016 House and Senate elections.

== Leadership ==
=== Senate leadership ===
==== Senate officers ====
- Lieutenant Governor and Speaker of the Senate: Randy McNally
- Speaker Pro Tempore of the Senate: Jim Tracy
- Deputy Speakers of the Senate: Ferrell Haile

==== Republican caucus leaders ====
- Republican Majority Leader: Mark Norris
- Republican Caucus Chairman: Bill Ketron
- Republican Caucus Treasurer: Ferrell Haile
- Republican Caucus Secretary: Becky Duncan Massey
- Republican Caucus Chaplain: Mark Green

==== Democratic caucus leaders ====
- Democratic Minority Leader: Lee Harris
- Democratic Caucus Chairman: Jeff Yarbro

=== House leadership ===
==== House officers ====
- Speaker of the House: Beth Harwell
- Speaker Pro Tempore of the House: Curtis Johnson
- Deputy Speaker of the House: Steve McDaniel

==== Republican caucus leaders ====
- Republican Majority Leader: Glen Casada
  - Assistant Republican Leader: David Hawk
- Republican Caucus Chairman: Ryan Williams
  - Republican Caucus Vice-Chairman: Dennis Powers
- Republican Floor Leader: Micah Van Huss
  - Republican Assistant Floor Leaders: John Crawford and Ron Gant
- Republican Caucus Secretary/Treasurer: Dawn White
- Republican Whip: Timothy Hill

==== Democratic caucus leaders ====
- Democratic Leader: Craig Fitzhugh
  - Assistant Democratic Leader: Joe Towns
- Democratic Leader Pro Tempore: John DeBerry
- Democratic Caucus Chairman: Mike Stewart
  - Democratic Caucus Vice-Chairman: Antonio Parkinson
- Democratic Floor Leader: Raumesh Akbari
- Democratic Caucus Secretary: Harold M. Love Jr.
- Democratic Caucus Treasurer: Karen Camper
- Democratic Whip: JoAnne Favors

== Party summary ==
=== Senate party summary ===
Affiliation	Members
Democratic	5
Republican	28
Total	33

=== House party summary ===
Affiliation	Members
Democratic	25
Republican	74
Total	99

== Members ==
=== Senate ===
▌1. Steve Southerland (R)
▌2. Doug Overbey (R) (from January 10, 2017 to November 21, 2017) (Note: Doug Overbey resigned from the Senate to become US Attorney for the Eastern District of Tennessee.)

▌ Art Swann (R) (from December 1, 2017)

▌3. Rusty Crowe (R)
▌4. Jon Lundberg (R)
▌5. Randy McNally (R)
▌6. Becky Duncan Massey (R)
▌7. Richard Briggs (R)
▌8. Frank Niceley (R)
▌9. Mike Bell (R)
▌10. Todd Gardenhire (R)
▌11. Bo Watson (R)
▌12. Ken Yager (R)
▌13. Bill Ketron (R)
▌14. Jim Tracy (R) (from January 10, 2017 to November 6, 2017)

▌ Shane Reeves (R) (from March 15, 2018)

▌15. Paul Bailey (R)
▌16. Janice Bowling (R)
▌17. Mae Beavers (R) (from January 10, 2017 to September 1, 2017)

▌ Mark Pody (R) (from January 9, 2018)

▌18. Ferrell Haile (R)
▌19. Thelma Harper (D)
▌20. Steven Dickerson (R)
▌21. Jeff Yarbro (D)
▌22. Mark Green (R)
▌23. Jack Johnson (R)
▌24. John Stevens (R)
▌25. Kerry Roberts (R)
▌26. Dolores Gresham (R)
▌27. Ed Jackson (R)
▌28. Joey Hensley (R)
▌29. Lee Harris (D)
▌30. Sara Kyle (D)
▌31. Brian Kelsey (R)
▌32. Mark Norris (R)
▌33. Reginald Tate (D)

=== House of Representatives ===
▌1. John Crawford (R)
▌2. Bud Hulsey (R)
▌3. Timothy Hill (R)
▌4. John Holsclaw Jr. (R)
▌5. David Hawk (R)
▌6. Micah Van Huss (R)
▌7. Matthew Hill (R)
▌8. Art Swann (R) (from January 10, 2017 to December 1, 2017)

▌ Jerome Moon (R) (from December 13, 2017)

▌9. Gary Hicks (R)
▌10. Tilman Goins (R)
▌11. Jeremy Faison (R)
▌12. Dale Carr (R)
▌13. Eddie Smith (R)
▌14. Jason Zachary (R)
▌15. Rick Staples (D)
▌16. Bill Dunn (R)
▌17. Andrew Farmer (R)
▌18. Martin Daniel (R)
▌19. Harry Brooks (R)
▌20. Bob Ramsey (R)
▌21. Jimmy Matlock (R)
▌22. Dan Howell (R)
▌23. John Forgety (R)
▌24. Kevin Brooks (R)
▌25. Cameron Sexton (R)
▌26. Gerald McCormick (R)
▌27. Patsy Hazlewood (R)
▌28. JoAnne Favors (D)
▌29. Mike Carter (R)
▌30. Marc Gravitt (R)
▌31. Ron Travis (R)
▌32. Kent Calfee (R)
▌33. John Ragan (R)
▌34. Tim Rudd (R)
▌35. Jerry Sexton (R)
▌36. Dennis Powers (R)
▌37. Dawn White (R)
▌38. Kelly Keisling (R)
▌39. David Alexander (R)
▌40. Terri Lynn Weaver (R)
▌41. John Windle (D)
▌42. Ryan Williams (R)
▌43. Paul Sherrell (R)
▌44. William Lamberth (R)
▌45. Courtney Rogers (R)
▌46. Mark Pody (R) (from January 10, 2017 to January 9, 2018)

▌ Clark Boyd (R) (from January 10, 2018)

▌47. Judd Matheny (R)
▌48. Bryan Terry (R)
▌49. Mike Sparks (R)
▌50. Bo Mitchell (D)
▌51. Bill Beck (D)
▌52. Mike Stewart (D)
▌53. Jason Powell (D)
▌54. Brenda Gilmore (D)
▌55. John Ray Clemmons (D)
▌56. Beth Harwell (R)
▌57. Susan Lynn (R)
▌58. Harold Love Jr. (D)
▌59. Sherry Jones (D)
▌60. Darren Jernigan (D)
▌61. Charles Sargent (R)
▌62. Pat Marsh (R)
▌63. Glen Casada (R)
▌64. Sheila Butt (R)
▌65. Sam Whitson (R)
▌66. Sabi Kumar (R)
▌67. Joe Pitts (D)
▌68. Curtis Johnson (R)
▌69. Michael Curcio (R)
▌70. Barry Doss (R)
▌71. David Byrd (R)
▌72. Steve McDaniel (R)
▌73. Jimmy Eldridge (R)
▌74. Jay Reedy (R)
▌75. Tim Wirgau (R)
▌76. Andy Holt (R)
▌77. Bill Sanderson (R)
▌78. Mary Littleton (R)
▌79. Curtis Halford (R)
▌80. Johnny Shaw (D)
▌81. Debra Moody (R)
▌82. Craig Fitzhugh (D)
▌83. Mark White (R)
▌84. Joe Towns (D)
▌85. Johnnie Turner (D)
▌86. Barbara Cooper (D)
▌87. Karen Camper (D)
▌88. Larry Miller (D)
▌89. Roger Kane (R)
▌90. John DeBerry (D)
▌91. Raumesh Akbari (D)
▌92. Rick Tillis (R)
▌93. G. A. Hardaway (D)
▌94. Ron Gant (R)
▌95. Mark Lovell (R) (from January 10, 2017 to February 14, 2017)

▌ Kevin Vaughan (R) (from August 24, 2017)

▌96. Dwayne Thompson (D)
▌97. Jim Coley (R)
▌98. Antonio Parkinson (D)
▌99. Ron Lollar (R)

== See also ==
- List of Tennessee General Assemblies
