= 114th Tennessee General Assembly =

2025–2027 Tennessee legislative term

114th Tennessee Legislative Assembly
←	113th General Assembly	115th General Assembly	→
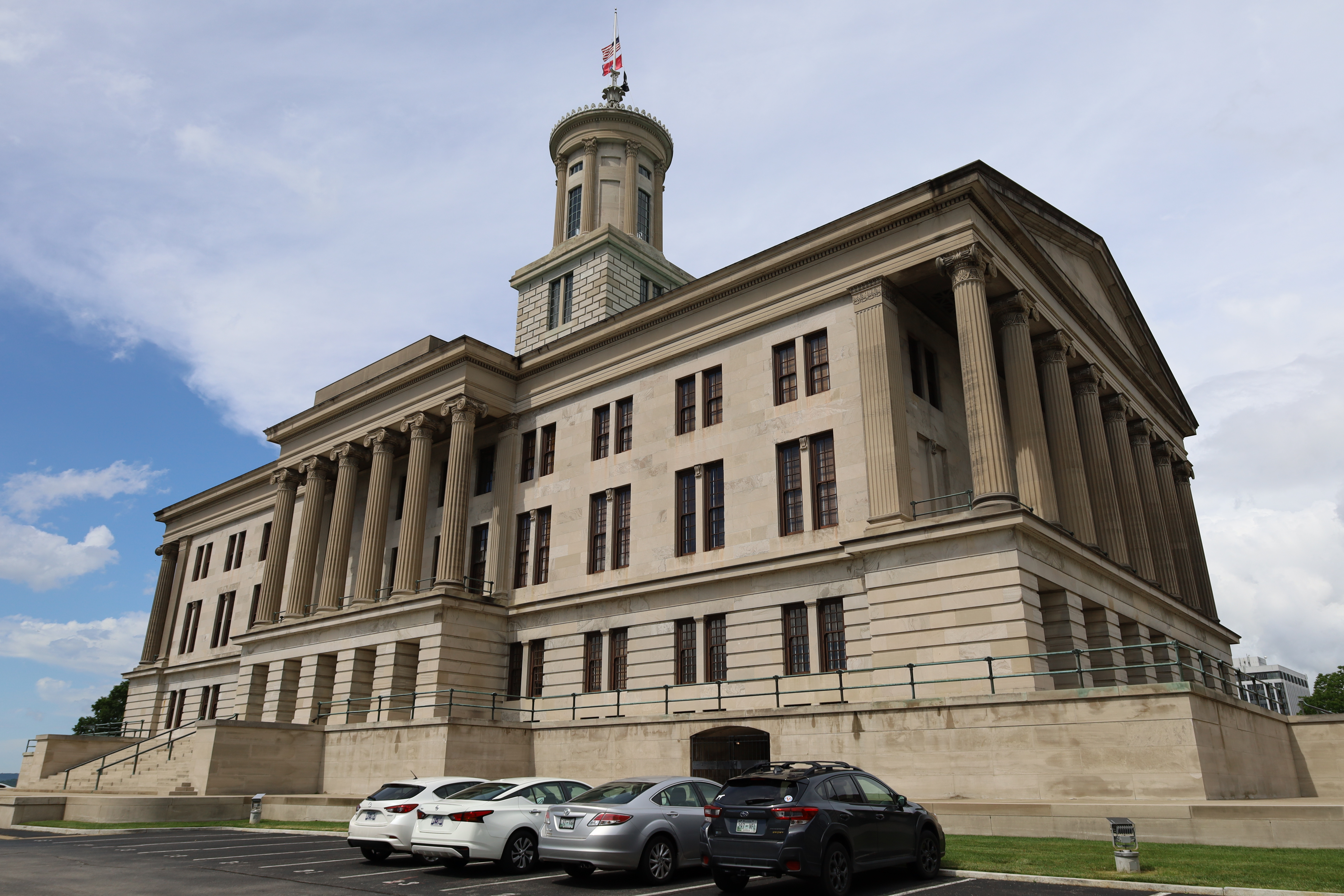
- The legislature took place in the Tennessee State Capitol, seen here in 2022

Overview
- Legislative body: Tennessee General Assembly
- Jurisdiction: Tennessee, United States
- Meeting place: Tennessee State Capitol
- Term: 2025–2027
- Website: capitol.tn.gov

Tennessee State Senate
- Members: 33 Senators
- Senate President: Randy McNally (R)
- Majority Leader: Jack Johnson (R)
- Minority Leader: Raumesh Akbari (D)
- Party control: Republican Party of Tennessee

Tennessee House of Representatives
- Members: 99 Representatives
- Speaker of the House: Cameron Sexton (R)
- Majority Leader: William Lamberth (R)
- Minority Leader: Karen Camper (D)
- Party control: Republican Party of Tennessee

The 114th Tennessee General Assembly is the gathering of the Tennessee General Assembly, consisting of the Tennessee Senate and Tennessee House of Representatives, meeting between January 2025 and January 2027.

The 114th Assembly has convened for two standard sessions in 2025 and 2026. It also convened for an extraordinary session in May 2026.

== History ==
On November 5, 2024, lawmakers were chosen to participate in the 114th Assembly through Tennessee's House and Senate elections. In the elections, no districts in either the House or Senate flipped from the previous cycle, ensuring that both chambers would maintain Republican supermajorities.

The 2025 session of the 114th Tennessee General Assembly began on January 14 and adjourned on April 22. For the 2026 session, they convened on January 13 and adjourned on April 23. The Assembly also convened for one special session between May 5 and 7, during which lawmakers voted in favor of mid-cycle redistricting of Tennessee's congressional districts.

== Party summary ==
=== Senate party summary ===
Senate composition by district Held by Democrats Held by Republicans

Affiliation	Members
Democratic	6
Republican	27
Total	33

=== House party summary ===
House composition by district Held by Democrats Held by Republicans

Affiliation	Members
Democratic	24
Republican	75
Total	99

== Leadership ==
=== Senate leadership ===
==== Senate officers ====
- Lieutenant Governor and Speaker of the Senate: Randy McNally
- Speaker Pro Tempore of the Senate: Ferrell Haile
- Deputy Speakers of the Senate: Joey Hensley and John Stevens

==== Republican caucus leaders ====
- Republican Majority Leader: Jack Johnson
- Republican Caucus Chairman: Ken Yager
- Republican Caucus Treasurer: Bill Powers
- Republican Caucus Secretary: Dawn White
- Republican Caucus Chaplain: Shane Reeves

==== Democratic caucus leaders ====
- Democratic Minority Leader: Raumesh Akbari
- Democratic Caucus Chairman: London Lamar

=== House leadership ===
==== House officers ====
- Speaker of the House: Cameron Sexton
- Speaker Pro Tempore of the House: Pat Marsh
- Deputy Speaker of the House: Jason Zachary

==== Republican caucus leaders ====
- Republican Majority Leader: William Lamberth
  - Assistant Republican Leader: Mark Cochran
- Republican Caucus Chairman: Jeremy Faison
  - Republican Caucus Vice-Chairman: Tim Hicks
- Republican Whip: Johnny Garrett
- Republican Floor Leader: Paul Sherrell
  - Republican Assistant Floor Leader: Fred Atchley
- Republican Caucus Secretary: Kip Capley
- Republican Caucus Treasurer: Rebecca Alexander

==== Democratic caucus leaders ====
- Democratic Leader: Karen Camper
  - Assistant Democratic Leader: Harold M. Love Jr.
- Democratic Leader Pro Tempore: Larry Miller
- Democratic Caucus Chairman: John Ray Clemmons
  - Democratic Caucus Vice-Chairman: Bob Freeman
- Democratic Whip: Sam McKenzie
- Democratic Floor Leader: Torrey Harris
  - Democratic Assistant Floor Leader: Shaundelle Brooks
- Democratic Caucus Secretary: Yusuf Hakeem
- Democratic Caucus Treasurer: Ronnie Glynn

== Members ==
=== Senate ===
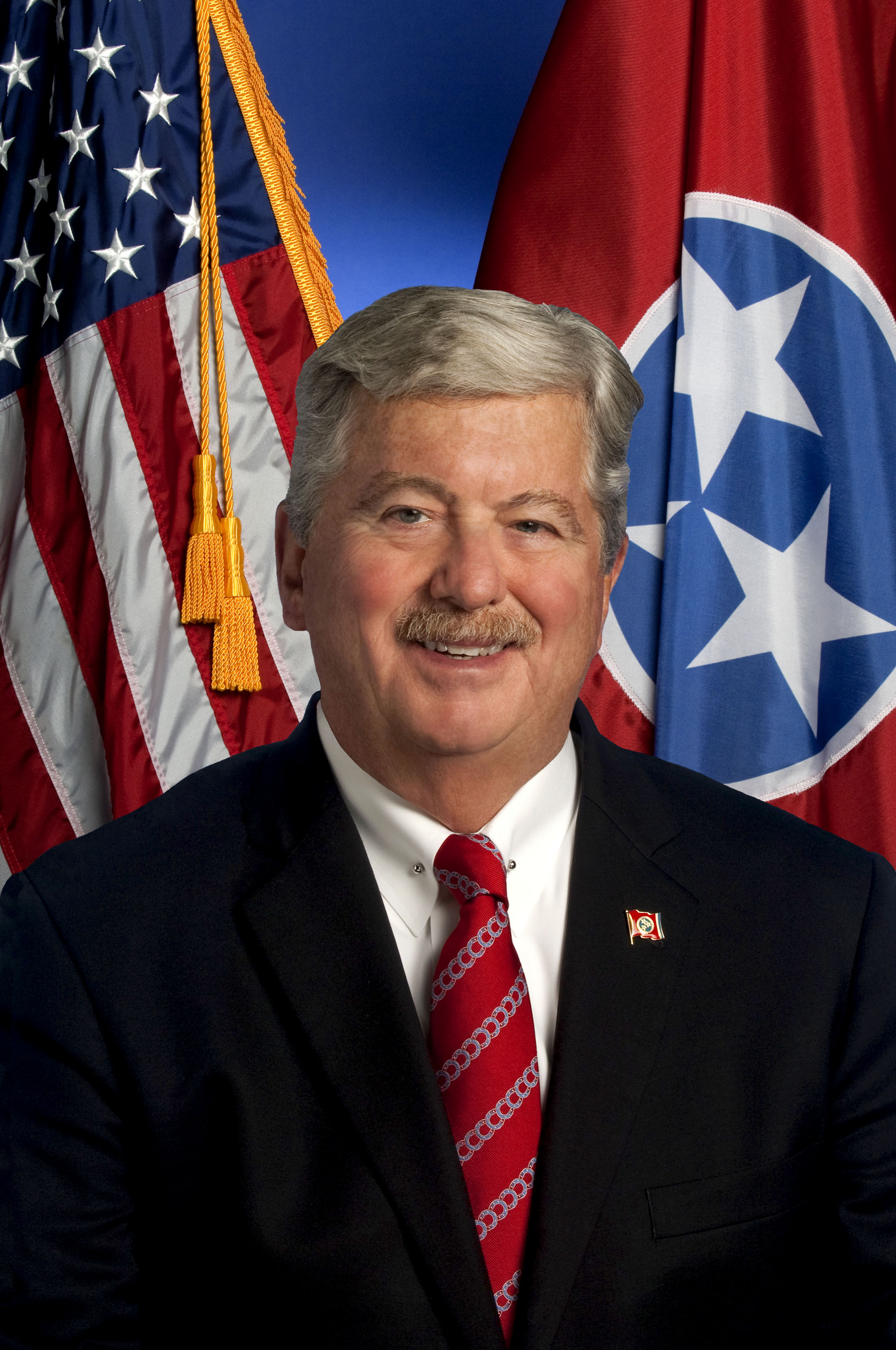
Lieutenant Governor of Tennessee Speaker of the Tennessee Senate Randy McNally (R-5)

▌1. Adam Lowe (R)
▌2. Tom Hatcher (R)
▌3. Rusty Crowe (R)
▌4. Bobby Harshbarger (R)
▌5. Randy McNally (R)
▌6. Becky Duncan Massey (R)
▌7. Richard Briggs (R)
▌8. Jessie Seal (R)
▌9. Steve Southerland (R)
▌10. Todd Gardenhire (R)
▌11. Bo Watson (R)
▌12. Ken Yager (R)
▌13. Dawn White (R)
▌14. Shane Reeves (R)
▌15. Paul Bailey (R)
▌16. Janice Bowling (R)
▌17. Mark Pody (R)
▌18. Ferrell Haile (R)
▌19. Charlane Oliver (D)
▌20. Heidi Campbell (D)
▌21. Jeff Yarbro (D)
▌22. Bill Powers (R)
▌23. Kerry Roberts (R)
▌24. John Stevens (R)
▌25. Ed Jackson (R)
▌26. Page Walley (R)
▌27. Jack Johnson (R)
▌28. Joey Hensley (R)
▌29. Raumesh Akbari (D)
▌30. Sara Kyle (D)
▌31. Brent Taylor (R)
▌32. Paul Rose (R)
▌33. London Lamar (D)

=== House of Representatives ===
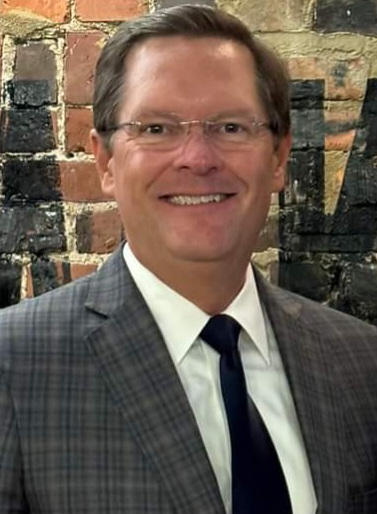
Speaker of the Tennessee House of Representatives Cameron Sexton (R-25)

▌1. John Crawford (R)
▌2. Bud Hulsey (R)
▌3. Timothy Hill (R)
▌4. Renea Jones (R)
▌5. David Hawk (R)
▌6. Tim Hicks (R)
▌7. Rebecca Alexander (R)
▌8. Jerome Moon (R)
▌9. Gary Hicks (R)
▌10. Rick Eldridge (R)
▌11. Jeremy Faison (R)
▌12. Fred Atchley (R)
▌13. Robert Stevens (R)
▌14. Jason Zachary (R)
▌15. Sam McKenzie (D)
▌16. Michele Carringer (R)
▌17. Andrew Farmer (R)
▌18. Elaine Davis (R)
▌19. Dave Wright (R)
▌20. Tom Stinnett (R)
▌21. Lowell Russell (R)
▌22. Dan Howell (R)
▌23. Mark Cochran (R)
▌24. Kevin Raper (R)
▌25. Cameron Sexton (R)
▌26. Greg Martin (R)
▌27. Michele Reneau (R)
▌28. Yusuf Hakeem (D)
▌29. Greg Vital (R)
▌30. Esther Helton-Haynes (R)
▌31. Ron Travis (R)
▌32. Monty Fritts (R)
▌33. Richard Scarbrough (R)
▌34. Tim Rudd (R)
▌35. William Slater (R)
▌36. Dennis Powers (R)
▌37. Charlie Baum (R)
▌38. Kelly Keisling (R)
▌39. Iris Rudder (R)
▌40. Michael Hale (R)
▌41. Ed Butler (R)
▌42. Ryan Williams (R)
▌43. Paul Sherrell (R)
▌44. William Lamberth (R)
▌45. Johnny Garrett (R)
▌46. Clark Boyd (R)
▌47. Rush Bricken (R)
▌48. Bryan Terry (R)
▌49. Mike Sparks (R)
▌50. Bo Mitchell (D)
▌51. Aftyn Behn (D)
▌52. Justin Jones (D)
▌53. Jason Powell (D)
▌54. Vincent Dixie (D)
▌55. John Ray Clemmons (D)
▌56. Bob Freeman (D)
▌57. Susan Lynn (R)
▌58. Harold Love Jr. (D)
▌59. Caleb Hemmer (D)
▌60. Shaundelle Brooks (D)
▌61. Gino Bulso (R)
▌62. Pat Marsh (R)
▌63. Jake McCalmon (R)
▌64. Scott Cepicky (R)
▌65. Lee Reeves (R)
▌66. Sabi Kumar (R)
▌67. Ronnie Glynn (D)
▌68. Aron Maberry (R)
▌69. Jody Barrett (R)
▌70. Clay Doggett (R)
▌71. Kip Capley (R)
▌72. Kirk Haston (R)
▌73. Chris Todd (R)
▌74. Jay Reedy (R)
▌75. Jeff Burkhart (R) (until November 14, 2025) (Note: Jeff Burkhart died on November 14, 2025. Montgomery County Commissioner Michael Lankford was appointed to finish the term on December 8, 2025. He was sworn in on January 13, 2026.)

▌ Michael Lankford (R) (from January 13, 2026)

▌76. Tandy Darby (R)
▌77. Rusty Grills (R)
▌78. Mary Littleton (R)
▌79. Brock Martin (R)
▌80. Johnny Shaw (D)
▌81. Debra Moody (R)
▌82. Chris Hurt (R)
▌83. Mark White (R)
▌84. Joe Towns (D)
▌85. Jesse Chism (D)
▌86. Justin Pearson (D)
▌87. Karen Camper (D)
▌88. Larry Miller (D)
▌89. Justin Lafferty (R)
▌90. Gloria Johnson (D)
▌91. Torrey Harris (D)
▌92. Todd Warner (R)
▌93. G. A. Hardaway (D) (until April 24, 2026) (Note: G. A. Hardaway died on April 24, 2026. His son, T. J. Hardaway, was appointed to finish the term by the Shelby County Commission. The junior Hardaway was sworn in on May 7, 2026.)

▌ T. J. Hardaway (D) (from May 7, 2026)

▌94. Ron Gant (R)
▌95. Kevin Vaughan (R)
▌96. Gabby Salinas (D)
▌97. John Gillespie (R)
▌98. Antonio Parkinson (D)
▌99. Tom Leatherwood (R)

== See also ==
- List of Tennessee General Assemblies
