= David Shepard (politician) =

American politician (1947–2021)

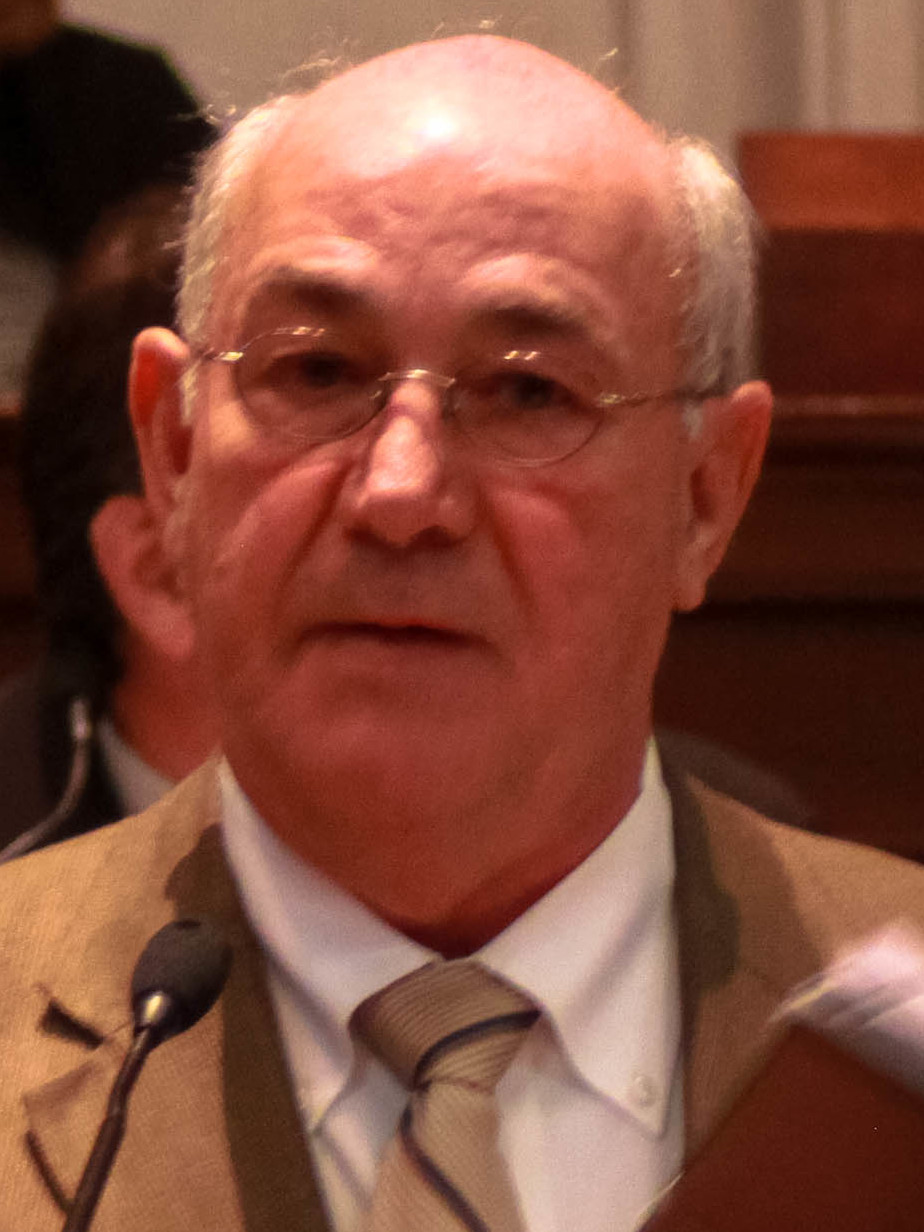

Member of the Tennessee House of Representatives from the 69th district
- In office January 2001 – January 2017
- Preceded by: Douglas S. Jackson
- Succeeded by: Michael Curcio

Member of the Dickson County Commission from the 9th District
- In office January 2019 – February 4, 2021
- Preceded by: Tony Adams

Personal details
- Born: October 6, 1947 Hickman County, Tennessee
- Died: February 4, 2021 (aged 73)
- Party: Democratic
- Education: University of Tennessee at Martin; University of Tennessee

Military service
- Branch/service: United States Army
- Years of service: 1969–1971
- Rank: First Lieutenant

David A. Shepard (October 6, 1947 – February 4, 2021) was an American politician and a Democratic member of the Tennessee House of Representatives. He represented District 69 from January 2001 through January 2017. In November 2018, Shepard won election to the Dickson County Commission, defeating incumbent commissioner Tony Adams.

Shepard, who had cancer, died on February 4, 2021, after contracting COVID-19 during the COVID-19 pandemic in Tennessee.

== Education ==
Shepard earned his BS from the University of Tennessee at Martin and his Doctor of Pharmacy from the University of Tennessee Health Science Center's College of Pharmacy.

== Elections ==
Shepard began his public service as an alderman for the City of Dickson, Tennessee, eventually being chosen by his fellows as vice-mayor.

- 2000 When District 69 Democratic Representative Douglas S. Jackson ran for Tennessee Senate and left the seat open, Shepard ran in the four-way August 3, 2000 Democratic Primary, winning with 3,329 votes (42.5%), and won the November 7, 2000 General election with 12,751 votes (63.1%) against Republican nominee Danny Tidwell.
- 2002 Shepard was unopposed for the August 1, 2002 Democratic Primary, winning with 7,619 votes, and won the November 5, 2002 General election with 11,533 votes (68.9%) against Republican nominee Dennis Bryant.
- 2004 Shepard was unopposed for both the August 5, 2004 Democratic Primary, winning with 3,385 votes, and the November 2, 2004 General election, winning with 18,278 votes.
- 2006 Shepard was unopposed for both the August 3, 2006 Democratic Primary, winning with 6,309 votes, and the November 7, 2006 General election, winning with 14,767 votes.
- 2008 Shepard was unopposed for the August 7, 2008 Democratic Primary, winning with 1,597 votes, and won the November 4, 2008 General election with 15,687 votes (75.6%) against Independent candidate W. Ryan Akin.
- 2010 Shepard was unopposed for the August 5, 2010 Democratic Primary, winning with 5,764 votes, and won the November 2, 2010 General election with 7,815 votes (54.0%) against Republican nominee Wayne White.
- 2012 Shepard and returning 2010 Republican challenger Wayne White both won their August 2, 2012 primaries, setting up a rematch; Shepard won the three-way November 6, 2012 General election with 11,669 votes (55.2%) against White and Independent candidate Kenneth Buser.
- 2014 Shepard defeated Republican challenger Michael Curcio on November 6, 2014, by a vote of 6,246 (50.1%) to 6,231 (49.9%).
