= List of Tennessee General Assemblies =

List of Tennessee state legislatures

The following is a list of legislative terms of the Tennessee General Assembly, the law-making branch of government of the U.S. state of Tennessee. Tennessee became part of the United States on June 1, 1796.

== Legislatures ==
Number	Start date	Last election
1st Tennessee General Assembly	1794	
Tennessee Constitution of 1796
2nd Tennessee General Assembly	1797	
3rd Tennessee General Assembly	1799	
4th Tennessee General Assembly	1801	
5th Tennessee General Assembly	1803	
6th Tennessee General Assembly	1805	
7th Tennessee General Assembly	1807	
8th Tennessee General Assembly	1809	
9th Tennessee General Assembly	1811	
10th Tennessee General Assembly	1813	
11th Tennessee General Assembly	1815	
12th Tennessee General Assembly	1817	
13th Tennessee General Assembly	1819	
14th Tennessee General Assembly	1821	
15th Tennessee General Assembly	1823	
16th Tennessee General Assembly	1825	
17th Tennessee General Assembly	1827	
18th Tennessee General Assembly	1829	
19th Tennessee General Assembly	1831	
20th Tennessee General Assembly	1833	
Tennessee Constitution of 1834
21st Tennessee General Assembly	1835	
22nd Tennessee General Assembly	1837	
23rd Tennessee General Assembly	1839	
24th Tennessee General Assembly	1841	
25th Tennessee General Assembly	1843	
26th Tennessee General Assembly	1845	
27th Tennessee General Assembly	1847	
28th Tennessee General Assembly	1849	
29th Tennessee General Assembly	1851	
30th Tennessee General Assembly	1853	
31st Tennessee General Assembly	1855	
32nd Tennessee General Assembly	1857	
33rd Tennessee General Assembly	1859	
34th Tennessee General Assembly	1865	
35th Tennessee General Assembly	1867	
36th Tennessee General Assembly	1869	
Tennessee Constitution of 1870
37th Tennessee General Assembly	1871	
38th Tennessee General Assembly	1873	
39th Tennessee General Assembly	1875	
40th Tennessee General Assembly	1877	
41st Tennessee General Assembly	1879	
42nd Tennessee General Assembly	1881	
43rd Tennessee General Assembly	1883	
44th Tennessee General Assembly	1885	
45th Tennessee General Assembly	1887	
46th Tennessee General Assembly	1889	
47th Tennessee General Assembly	1891	
48th Tennessee General Assembly	1893	
49th Tennessee General Assembly	1895	
50th Tennessee General Assembly	1897	
51st Tennessee General Assembly	1899	
52nd Tennessee General Assembly	1901	
53rd Tennessee General Assembly	1903	
54th Tennessee General Assembly	1905	
55th Tennessee General Assembly	1907	
56th Tennessee General Assembly	1909	
57th Tennessee General Assembly	1911	
58th Tennessee General Assembly	1913	
59th Tennessee General Assembly	1915	
60th Tennessee General Assembly	1917	
61st Tennessee General Assembly	1919	
62nd Tennessee General Assembly	1921	
63rd Tennessee General Assembly	1923	
64th Tennessee General Assembly	1925	
65th Tennessee General Assembly	1927	
66th Tennessee General Assembly	1929	
67th Tennessee General Assembly	1931	
68th Tennessee General Assembly	1933	
69th Tennessee General Assembly	1935	
70th Tennessee General Assembly	1937	
71st Tennessee General Assembly	1939	
72nd Tennessee General Assembly	1941	
73rd Tennessee General Assembly	1942	
74th Tennessee General Assembly	1944	
75th Tennessee General Assembly	1947	
76th Tennessee General Assembly	1951	
77th Tennessee General Assembly	1951	
78th Tennessee General Assembly	1953	
79th Tennessee General Assembly	1955	
80th Tennessee General Assembly	1957	
81st Tennessee General Assembly	1959	
82nd Tennessee General Assembly	1961	
83rd Tennessee General Assembly	1963	
84th Tennessee General Assembly	1965	
85th Tennessee General Assembly	1967	
86th Tennessee General Assembly	1969	
87th Tennessee General Assembly	1971	
88th Tennessee General Assembly	1973	
89th Tennessee General Assembly	1975	
90th Tennessee General Assembly	1977	
91st Tennessee General Assembly	1979	
92nd Tennessee General Assembly	1981	
93rd Tennessee General Assembly	1983	
94th Tennessee General Assembly	1985	
95th Tennessee General Assembly	1987	
96th Tennessee General Assembly	1989	
97th Tennessee General Assembly	1991	
98th Tennessee General Assembly	1993	
99th Tennessee General Assembly	January 10, 1995	
100th Tennessee General Assembly	January 14, 1997	
101st Tennessee General Assembly	January 12, 1999	
102nd Tennessee General Assembly	January 9, 2001	
103rd Tennessee General Assembly	January 14, 2003	
104th Tennessee General Assembly	January 11, 2005	
105th Tennessee General Assembly	January 9, 2007	November 7, 2006: House, Senate
106th Tennessee General Assembly	January 13, 2009	November 4, 2008: House, Senate
107th Tennessee General Assembly	January 11, 2011	November 9, 2010: House, Senate
108th Tennessee General Assembly	January 8, 2013	November 6, 2012: House, Senate
109th Tennessee General Assembly	January 13, 2015	November 4, 2014: House, Senate
110th Tennessee General Assembly	January 10, 2017	November 8, 2016: House, Senate
111th Tennessee General Assembly	January 8, 2019	November 6, 2018: House, Senate
112th Tennessee General Assembly	January 12, 2021	November 3, 2020: House, Senate
113th Tennessee General Assembly	January 10, 2023	November 8, 2022: House, Senate
114th Tennessee General Assembly	January 14, 2025	November 5, 2024: House, Senate

== See also ==
- List of speakers of the Tennessee House of Representatives
- List of governors of Tennessee
- Politics of Tennessee
- Elections in Tennessee
- Tennessee State Capitol
- Timeline of Tennessee
- Lists of United States state legislative sessions
