= Brock Martin =

American politician (born 1984)

Member of the Tennessee House of Representatives from the 79th district
- Incumbent
- Assumed office January 10, 2023
- Preceded by: Curtis Halford

Personal details
- Born: October 4, 1984 (age 42) Carroll County, Tennessee, U.S.
- Party: Republican
- Spouse: Krista
- Children: 3
- Education: Bethel University; Logan College of Chiropractic (DC)
- Website: House website Campaign website

Brock Martin (born October 4, 1984) is an American politician. A member of the Republican Party, he represents the 79th district in the Tennessee House of Representatives, which includes parts of Gibson, Carroll, and Henderson counties.

Martin graduated from Camden Central High School in 2003. He graduated from Logan College of Chiropractic in 2010. Martin and his wife, Krista, operate a chiropractic and acupuncture clinic in Huntingdon, Tennessee.
