= Mark Lovell (politician) =

American politician (born 1958)

Member of the Tennessee House of Representatives from the 95th district
- In office January 10, 2017 – February 14, 2017
- Preceded by: Curry Todd
- Succeeded by: Kevin Vaughan

Personal details
- Born: July 1, 1958 (age 68)
- Party: Republican
- Spouse: Linda Lovell
- Children: 3

Mark Dewayne Lovell (born July 1, 1958) is an American former politician in the state of Tennessee. He served in the Tennessee House of Representatives for just over a month in 2017, sitting as a Republican. After taking office on January 10, he resigned on February 14, amidst allegations of inappropriate sexual contact.
