= Curtis Halford =

Tennessee politician (1943–2025)

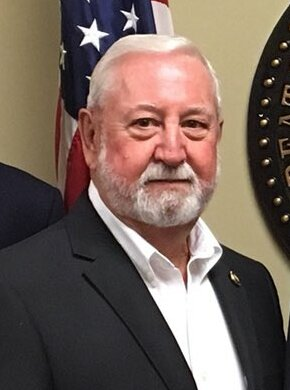
- Halford in 2018

Member of the Tennessee House of Representatives from the 79th district
- In office January 13, 2009 – January 10, 2023
- Preceded by: Chris Crider
- Succeeded by: Brock Martin

Personal details
- Born: March 27, 1943
- Died: January 24, 2025 (aged 81)
- Party: Republican
- Spouse: Charlotte
- Children: 2
- Education: Draughons Practical Business College

Curtis Halford (March 27, 1943 – January 24, 2025) was an American politician who served in the Tennessee House of Representatives from 2009 to 2023, representing the 79th district as a member of the Republican Party. Prior to his tenure in the state house, he served on the county commission in Gibson County, Tennessee.

== Background ==
Curtis Halford was born on March 27, 1943. He graduated from Kenton High School in 1961, and graduated from Draughons Practical Business College with a degree in accounting. He served as a reserve member of the United States Air Force.

Halford died on January 24, 2025, at the age of 81.

== Career ==
=== Local politics ===
Halford served on the county commission in Gibson County, Tennessee, for six years from position one in the 19th district. Kenny Flowers was appointed by the commission to fill the vacancy created after Halford left the commission to serve in the Tennessee House of Representatives.

=== Tennessee House of Representatives ===
==== Elections ====
On March 7, 2008, Halford announced that he would seek the Republican nomination for a seat in the Tennessee House of Representatives from the 79th district to succeed Representative Chris Crider who was retiring after being elected as mayor of Milan, Tennessee. He defeated Mark Renfroe in the Republican primary and defeated Democratic nominee Jim Ryal in the general election. During the campaign he had raised over $35,899 against Ryal's $18,970.

Halford won reelection in the 2010 election against Joe M. Shepard, the former mayor of Gibson County. Halford won reelection without opposition in 2012, 2016, and 2020. He defeated Democratic nominee Bobby Barnett, a member of the Humboldt, Tennessee city council, in the 2014 election. He defeated Democratic nominee Gregory Frye in the 2018 election.

==== Tenure ====
Speaker Cameron Sexton appointed Halford to serve in the National Conference of State Legislatures. During his tenure he served as secretary of the Agricultural committee, vice-chair of the Bill Review committee, and on the Health and Human Resources, and Ethics committees.

== Electoral history ==
2008 Tennessee House of Representatives 79th district election
Primary election
Party	Candidate	Votes	%
Republican	Curtis Halford	1,832	65.13%
Republican	Mark Renfroe	981	34.87%
Total votes		2,813	100.00%
General election
Republican	Curtis Halford	11,306	51.66%
Democratic	Jim Ryal	10,580	48.34%
Total votes		21,886	100.00%

2010 Tennessee House of Representatives 79th district election
Primary election
Party	Candidate	Votes	%
Republican	Curtis Halford (incumbent)	6,536	100.00%
Total votes		6,536	100.00%
General election
Republican	Curtis Halford (incumbent)	11,207	67.83%
Democratic	Joe M. Shepard	5,315	32.17%
Total votes		16,522	100.00%

2012 Tennessee House of Representatives 79th district election
Primary election
Party	Candidate	Votes	%
Republican	Curtis Halford (incumbent)	3,280	100.00%
Total votes		3,280	100.00%
General election
Republican	Curtis Halford (incumbent)	17,593	100.00%
Total votes		17,593	100.00%

2014 Tennessee House of Representatives 79th district election
Primary election
Party	Candidate	Votes	%
Republican	Curtis Halford (incumbent)	6,161	100.00%
Total votes		6,161	100.00%
General election
Republican	Curtis Halford (incumbent)	10,877	77.36%
Democratic	Bobby Barnett	3,183	22.64%
Total votes		14,060	100.00%

2016 Tennessee House of Representatives 79th district election
Primary election
Party	Candidate	Votes	%
Republican	Curtis Halford (incumbent)	3,002	63.70%
Republican	Daniel D. Williams	1,711	36.30%
Total votes		4,713	100.00%
General election
Republican	Curtis Halford (incumbent)	17,131	100.00%
Total votes		17,131	100.00%

2018 Tennessee House of Representatives 79th district election
Primary election
Party	Candidate	Votes	%
Republican	Curtis Halford (incumbent)	8,793	100.00%
Total votes		8,793	100.00%
General election
Republican	Curtis Halford (incumbent)	14,875	75.78%
Democratic	Gregory Frye	4,755	24.22%
Total votes		19,630	100.00%

2020 Tennessee House of Representatives 79th district election
Primary election
Party	Candidate	Votes	%
Republican	Curtis Halford (incumbent)	5,484	83.60%
Republican	Christine Warrington	1,076	16.40%
Total votes		6,560	100.00%
General election
Republican	Curtis Halford (incumbent)	21,862	99.97%
Independent	Houston Butler Jr. (write-in)	7	0.03%
Total votes		21,869	100.00%
