= Michael Curcio =

American politician (born 1982)

Michael G. Curcio

Member of the Tennessee House of Representatives from the 69th district
- In office January 9, 2017 – November 8, 2022
- Preceded by: David Shepard
- Succeeded by: Jody Barrett

Personal details
- Born: November 15, 1982 (age 43)
- Party: Republican
- Education: University of Mississippi (BA)
- Website: Official website Campaign website

Michael G. Curcio (born November 15, 1982) is an American politician from the state of Tennessee. A Republican, Curcio formerly represented the 69th district of the Tennessee House of Representatives, based in Columbia and Dickson, from 2017–2022.

== Career ==
In 2014, Curcio ran for the 69th district of the Tennessee House of Representatives against Democratic incumbent David Shepard. After a heated race, Curcio lost to Shepard by 16 votes, 50.1-49.9%.

Curcio soon a declared a second campaign for the seat in 2016, while Shepard announced he would retire. This time, Curcio defeated two primary challengers before easily winning the general election over Democrat Dustin Evans and flipping the seat to Republicans.

Curcio ran to replace Cameron Sexton as Majority Caucus Chairman in 2019, but ultimately lost to fellow Republican representative Jeremy Faison.

== Personal life ==
Curcio lives in Dickson with his wife, Mary Katherine, and their three children.
