= Tennessee House of Representatives 95th district =

State legislative district in Tennessee

Tennessee's 95th State House of Representatives district
- Map of Tennessee House districts with the 95th District shaded in red
Representative
Kevin Vaughan; R–Memphis
since 2017
- Demographics: 67.3% White; 11.8% Black; 5.7% Hispanic; 10.7% Asian; 4.1% Multiracial
- Population (2024): 68,151

The Tennessee House of Representatives 95th district is one of the 99 legislative districts in the lower house of the Tennessee General Assembly. The district is located in West Tennessee and covers part of eastern Shelby County. The district includes most of Collierville, small parts of Memphis, Bartlett and Lakeland as well as unincorporated areas between. Kevin Vaughan has represented the district since 2017.

== Demographics ==
The Tennessee Comptroller estimates the population as of 2024 at 68,151.

- 67.3% of the district is White
- 11.8% of the district is Black
- 10.7% of the district is Asian
- 5.7% of the district is Hispanic
- 4.1% of the district is Two or more races

Detailed demographic information is also available through Census Reporter.

== History ==
The 88th Tennessee General Assembly was the first in which all districts were numbered. The 95th district has been part of Shelby County since it was created.

== List of Representatives ==
Representative	Party	Years of Service	General Assembly	Hometown
Kevin Vaughan	Republican	2017 - present	110th-114th	Collierville
Mark Lovell	Republican	January 10, 2017 - February 14, 2017*	110th	Cordova
Curry Todd	Republican	1999-2016	101st-109th	Collierville
Ed Haley	Republican	1991-1998	97th-100th	Millington
U.A. Presnell Moore	Republican	1975-1984	93rd-96th	Memphis
Neal Small	Independent	1981-1982	92nd	Memphis
Neal Small	Republican	1975-1980	89th-91st	Memphis
Noel K. Chivers	Republican	1973-1974	88th	Memphis

- Mark Lovell resigned February 14 amid allegations of sexual misconduct.
