= Tennessee House of Representatives 4th district =

State legislative district in Tennessee

Tennessee's 4th State House of Representatives district
- Map of Tennessee House districts, with the 4th District shaded in red
Representative
| Renea Jones; R–Unicoi |
- Demographics: 91.8% White; 1.6% Black; 3.8% Hispanic; 0.1% Other; 2.5% Multiracial
- Population (2024): 65,925

The Tennessee House of Representatives 4th district is one of 99 legislative districts included in the lower house of the Tennessee General Assembly. The district represents Unicoi County and most of Carter County. It includes the cities of Elizabethton, Erwin, and eastern suburbs of Johnson City. The district has been represented by Renea Jones since 2024.

== Demographics ==
According to the 2024 American Community Survey, District 4 had a population of approximately 65,925.

- 91.8% of the district's population is White
- 1.6% of the district's population is African American
- 3.8% of the district's population is Hispanic
- 0.1% of the district's population is Asian
- 2.5% of the district's population is two or more races

== List of representatives ==
| Representative | Party | Years of service | General Assembly | Residence |
|---|---|---|---|---|
| Albert E. Miller Sr. | Republican | 1973–1975 | 88th | Elizabethton |
| Robert Fisher | Republican | 1975–1981 | 89th-91st | Elizabethton |
| Frank "Bob" Percy | Republican | 1981–1985 | 92nd-94th* | Elizabethton |
| Joseph R. Treadway | Republican | 1985 | 94th* | Elizabethton |
| Barton A. Hawkins | Republican | 1985–1989 | 94th-96th** | Mountain City |
| Bruce B. Triplett | Republican | 1989–1990 | 96th** | Mountain City |
| Ralph Cole | Republican | 1990–2003 | 96th-102nd | Elizabethton |
| Jerome Cochran | Republican | 2003–2007 | 103rd-104th | Elizabethton |
| Kent Williams | Republican | 2007–2009 | 105th-106th | Elizabethton |
| Kent Williams | Independent | 2009–2015 | 107th-108th | Elizabethton |
| John Holsclaw Jr. | Republican | 2015–2025 | 109th-113th | Elizabethton |
| Renea Jones | Republican | 2025–present | 114th | Unicoi |

*Representative Frank Percy died while serving in the 94th General Assembly. Joseph R. Treadway was appointed on March 4, 1985, to fill the vacancy until an election could be held.

**Representative Barton Hawkins resigned during the 96th General Assembly. Bruce B. Triplett was appointed on October 30, 1989, to serve until an election could be held. Ralph Cole was elected on January 9, 1990.
