= Chris Todd (politician) =

American politician (born 1966)

Member of the Tennessee House of Representatives from the 73rd district
- Incumbent
- Assumed office January 8, 2019
- Preceded by: Jimmy Eldridge

Personal details
- Born: November 26, 1966 (age 59)
- Party: Republican
- Spouse: Melissa Todd
- Children: 3
- Education: Union University (BS)
- Website: Official website Campaign website

Chris Todd (born November 26, 1966) is an American biologist and politician from the state of Tennessee. A Republican, Todd has represented the 73rd district of the Tennessee House of Representatives, based in Jackson, since 2019.

== Career ==
After graduating from Union University with a degree in biology, Todd worked as an environmental specialist with the Tennessee Department of Environment and Conservation. He also owns and operates Envirogreen Inc., a landscaping and erosion prevention company.

In 2018, Todd announced he would run for the 73rd district of the Tennessee House of Representatives, held by retiring Republican Jimmy Eldridge. With financial assistance from state house Majority Leader Glen Casada, Todd won the Republican primary over Jay Bush with 55% of the vote. In the heavily conservative district, Todd went on to easily defeat Democrat James Baxter in the general election.

In 2023, Todd supported a resolution to expel three Democratic lawmakers from the legislature for violating decorum rules. The expulsion was widely characterized as unprecedented.

== Personal life ==
Todd lives in Jackson with his wife, Melissa, and their 3 children.
