= Jesse Chism =

American politician (born 1980)

Member of the Tennessee House of Representatives from the 85th district
- Incumbent
- Assumed office January 8, 2019
- Preceded by: Johnnie Turner

Personal details
- Born: March 4, 1980 (age 46)
- Party: Democratic
- Education: Morehouse College; Union University (MEd)
- Website: House website Campaign website

Jesse Chism (born March 4, 1980) is an American politician. He is a Democrat representing the 85th district in the Tennessee House of Representatives.

== Early life and education ==
Chism studied in Overton High School. In 2003, Chism received his undergraduate degree in Business Administration from Morehouse College with a focus in marketing and economics. In 2012, he received a MEd from Union University.

He is a former high school teacher with Memphis City Schools.

He previously worked as a Disaster Inspector for Federal Emergency Management Agency (FEMA). Between 2013 and 2016, he was the Program Director for the Tennessee Mental Health Consumers Association.

He is currently a real estate investor. He is the president of Chism Consulting.

== Political career ==
In 2018, former 85th district representative Johnnie Turner announced that she would not seek another term. Chism ran for his seat, won a four-way Democratic primary with 35.7% of the vote, and was unopposed in the general election. He successfully ran for re-election in 2020. He run for re-election in 2024.

As of April 2024, Chism serves on the following committees:

- Education Instruction
- Education Instruction of 1st Extraordinary Session
- Government Operations Committee
- Government Operations Committee of 1st Extraordinary Session
- State Government Committee
- State Government Committee of 1st Extraordinary Session
- Departments & Agencies Subcommittee
- Departments & Agencies Subcommittee of 1st Extraordinary Session
- Education Instruction Subcommittee
- Education Instruction Subcommittee of 1st Extraordinary Session
- Joint Judiciary and Government

=== Electoral record ===
2018 Democratic primary: Tennessee House of Representatives, District 85
Party	Candidate	Votes	%
Democratic	Jesse Chism	3,217	35.7%
Democratic	Ricky Dixon	2,743	30.4%
Democratic	Lynnette Williams	2,620	29.1%
Democratic	Brett Williams	433	4.8%

2020 Democratic primary: Tennessee House of Representatives, District 85
Party	Candidate	Votes	%
Democratic	Jesse Chism	6,744	81.9%
Democratic	Alvin Crook	1,482	18.1%

== Honors & Awards ==
Chism has been recognized in the following areas.

- Fair Fight Fellowship, 2021
- Center for Advancement of Leadership Skills Scholar, 2021
- Chairman of Freshmen Democrats 2019-2020
- Emerging Leaders, 2019
