= Tennessee House of Representatives 88th district =

State legislative district in Tennessee

Tennessee's 88th State House of Representatives district
- Map of Tennessee House districts with the 88th District shaded in red
Representative
Larry Miller; D–Memphis
since 1993
- Demographics: 23.5% White; 65% Black; 5.6% Hispanic; 2.2% Asian; 3.1% Multiracial
- Population (2024): 72,547

The Tennessee House of Representatives 88th district is one of the 99 legislative districts in the lower house of the Tennessee General Assembly. The district is located in West Tennessee and covers part of central Shelby County. Larry Miller has represented the district since 1993.

== Geography ==
The district includes parts of Uptown Memphis and Bartlett. It includes areas west of the Memphis Zoo such as Stonewall Heights and the Medical District. It then stretches north across the Wolf River, covering much of Frayser. It also reaches east to include part of Bartlett and surrounding communities such as Spring Lake and Prosperity.

== Demographics ==
The Tennessee Comptroller estimates the population as of 2024 at 72,547. Poverty rates are more than 1.5x the Tennessee median of 13.8%, at 23.2%.

- 65% of the district is Black
- 23.5% of the district is White
- 5.6% of the district is Hispanic
- 2.2% of the district is Asian
- 3.1% of the district is Two or more races

Detailed demographic information is also available through Census Reporter.

== History ==
The 88th Tennessee General Assembly was the first in which all districts were numbered. At that time, the 88th district was in Crockett, Haywood, and Lauderdale counties. Since the 89th GA, The 88th district has been part of Shelby County.

== List of Representatives ==
Representative	Party	Years of Service	General Assembly	Hometown
Larry Miller	Democratic	1993 - present	98th-114th	Memphis
Edna Tullos	Republican	1991-1992	97th	Memphis
Guy A. Cain Jr.	Democratic	1987-1990	95th-96th	Memphis
Elbert Gill	Democratic	1975-1986	89th-94th	Memphis
Frank Garner	Democratic	1965-1974	84th-88th	Ripley
