= Tennessee House of Representatives 5th district =

State legislative district in Tennessee

Tennessee's 5th State House of Representatives district
- Map of Tennessee House districts, with the 5th District shaded in red
Representative
David B. Hawk; R–Greeneville
- Demographics: 93.4% White; 2.5% Black; 2.6% Hispanic; 0.3% Asian; 0.2% Other; 0.9% Multiracial
- Population (2024): 71,527

The Tennessee House of Representatives 5th district is one of 99 legislative districts included in the lower house of the Tennessee General Assembly. The district represents and is contiguous with Greene County. It includes Greeneville, Tusculum, and Mosheim. The district has been represented by David B. Hawk since 2003.

== Demographics ==
According to the 2024 American Community Survey, District 60 had a population of approximately 71,527.

- 93.4% of the district is White
- 2.5% of the district is African American
- 2.6% of the district is Hispanic
- 0.9% of the district is two or more races

== History ==
The geography of the district has varied through its history. The first General Assembly in which it occupied Greene County, its current position was the 88th. At the 87th it was Claiborne, Grainger and Union Counties, though there was a separate Greene County representative. At the time of the 96th Tennessee General Assembly (1989–90), it represented Carter, Greene, and Unicoi Counties. From the 103rd General Assembly (2003-2004) it represented Unicoi and part of Greene County. Following redistricting at the time of the 108th General Assembly (2013-2014), the district was made up of a part of Greene County. At the time of the 113th General Assembly (2023-2024) it was made all of Greene County.

== List of representatives ==
Representative	Party	Years of service	General Assembly	Residence
Bert L. McGuffin	Republican	1947–1948	75th	Mosheim
Kyle K. King	Democratic	1949–1950	76th	Greeneville
Frank M. Berry	Republican	1951–1952	77th	Greeneville
James N. Hardin	Democratic	1953–1954	78th	Greeneville
Thomas G. Hull	Republican	1955–1964	79th–83rd	Greeneville
Glenn D. Renner	Republican	1965–1966	84th	Greeneville
J. Luke Lowry	Republican	1967–1968	85th	Greeneville
Glenn D. Broyles	Republican	1969–1972	86th–87th	Chuckey
Robert Odell Burleson	Republican	1973–1978	88th–90th	Roan Mountain
Zane C. Whitson Jr.	Republican	1979–2002	91st–102nd	Unicoi
David B. Hawk	Republican	2003–present	103rd–114th	Greeneville
