= Larry Miller (Tennessee politician) =

American politician (born 1954)

Member of the Tennessee House of Representatives from the 88th district
- Incumbent
- Assumed office January 12, 1993
- Preceded by: Edna Tullos

Personal details
- Born: March 11, 1954 (age 72) Memphis, Tennessee, U.S.
- Party: Democratic
- Children: 1
- Education: LeMoyne–Owen College (BA)
- Website: House website

Larry J. Miller (born March 11, 1954) is an American politician and a Democratic member of the Tennessee House of Representatives representing the 88th district since January 1995.

== Education ==
Miller earned his BA in social science from LeMoyne–Owen College.

== Elections ==
- 2012 Miller was unopposed for the August 2, 2012 Democratic Primary, winning with 3,820 votes, and won the November 6, 2012 General election with 15,816 votes (75.3%) against Republican nominee Harry Barber.
- 1994 Miller was elected in the 1994 Democratic Primary and November 8, 1994 General election.
- 1996 Miller was challenged in the three-way 1996 Democratic Primary, but won, and was unopposed for the November 5, 1996 General election.
- 1998 Miller was unopposed for both the August 6, 1998 Democratic Primary, winning with 2,388 votes, and the November 3, 1998 General election, winning with 3,787 votes.
- 2000 Miller was unopposed for both the August 3, 2000 Democratic Primary, winning with 1,523 votes, and the November 7, 2000 General election, winning with 7,374 votes.
- 2002 Miller was unopposed for both the August 1, 2002 Democratic Primary, winning with 4,694 votes, and the November 5, 2002 General election, winning with 7,903 votes.
- 2004 Miller was unopposed for both the August 5, 2004 Democratic Primary, winning with 1,767 votes, and the November 2, 2004 General election, winning with 13,439 votes.
- 2006 Miller was unopposed for both the August 3, 2006 Democratic Primary, winning with 4,304 votes, and the November 7, 2006 General election, winning with 10,081 votes.
- 2008 Miller was unopposed for the August 7, 2008 Democratic Primary, winning with 2,882 votes, and won the November 4, 2008 General election with 14,051 votes (84.2%) against Independent candidate David Vinciarelli.
- 2010 Miller was unopposed for the August 5, 2010 Democratic Primary, and was unopposed for the November 2, 2010 General election, winning with 7,109 votes.
