= Tennessee House of Representatives 91st district =

State legislative district in Tennessee

Tennessee's 91st State House of Representatives district
- Map of Tennessee House districts with the 91st District shaded in red
Representative
Torrey Harris; D–Memphis
since 2021
- Demographics: 21.1% White; 67.1% Black; 7.8% Hispanic; 1.9% Asian; 2% Multiracial
- Population (2024): 71,178

The Tennessee House of Representatives 91st district is one of the 99 legislative districts in the lower house of the Tennessee General Assembly. The district is located in West Tennessee and covers part of central Shelby County. Torrey Harris has represented the district since 2021.

== Geography ==
The district includes most of South Memphis. It includes areas north of Graceland such as Nonconnah, Shadowlawn, and Rosemary Lane. It also includes the University of Memphis campus, covering areas south of it, then west towards Bellevue, curving around the 93rd district.

== Demographics ==
The Tennessee Comptroller estimates the population as of 2024 at 71,178. Poverty rates are more than 2x the Tennessee median of 13.8%, at 34.2%.

- 67.1% of the district is Black
- 21.1% of the district is White
- 7.8% of the district is Hispanic
- 1.9% of the district is Asian
- 2% of the district is Two or more races

Detailed demographic information is also available through Census Reporter.

== History ==
The 88th Tennessee General Assembly was the first in which all districts were numbered. Since its creation, the 91st district has been in Shelby County.

== List of Representatives ==
Representative	Party	Years of Service	General Assembly	Hometown
Torrey Harris	Democratic	2021 - present	112th-114th	Memphis
London Lamar	Democratic	2019-2020	111th	Memphis
Raumesh Akbari	Democratic	2013-2018	108th-110th	Memphis
Lois DeBerry	Democratic	1973 - July 28, 2013*	88th-107th	Memphis

- Lois DeBerry died in office. Raumesh Akbari was elected following a special election.
