= Tennessee House of Representatives 85th district =

State legislative district in Tennessee

Tennessee's 85th State House of Representatives district
- Map of Tennessee House districts with the 85th District shaded in red
Representative
Jesse Chism; D–Memphis
since 2019
- Demographics: 7.5% White; 83% Black; 4.7% Hispanic; 2.1% Asian; 2.3% Multiracial
- Population (2024): 68,969

The Tennessee House of Representatives 85th district is one of the 99 legislative districts in the lower house of the Tennessee General Assembly. The district is located in West Tennessee and covers far southern Shelby County along the state line. The district includes parts of Memphis, Collierville, as well as unincorporated areas between. The district covers areas such as Acklena, Stone Creek, and Whitehaven View. The boundary of the district follows Bill Morris Parkway, Shelby Drive, and Morris Drive at different sections, sometimes reaching north of them. Jesse Chism has represented the district since 2019.

== Demographics ==
The Tennessee Comptroller estimates the population as of 2024 at 68,969.

- 83% of the district is Black
- 7.5% of the district is White
- 4.7% of the district is Hispanic
- 2.1% of the district is Asian
- 2.3% of the district is Two or more races

Detailed demographic information is also available through Census Reporter.

== History ==
Prior to its creation, the area that became the 85th district was associated with the 4th district of Shelby County. The 88th Tennessee General Assembly was the first in which all districts were numbered. The 85th district has been part of Shelby County since it was created.

== List of Representatives ==
Representative	Party	Years of Service	General Assembly	Hometown
Jesse Chism	Democratic	2019-present	111th-114th	Memphis
Johnnie Turner	Democratic	2009-2018	106th-110th	Memphis
Larry Turner	Democratic	1985-2008	94th-105th	Memphis
Teddy Withers	Democratic	1975-1984	89th-93rd	Memphis
Tommy Powell	Democratic	1969-1974	86th-88th	Memphis
