= Tennessee House of Representatives 29th district =

State legislative district in Tennessee

Tennessee's 29th State House of Representatives district
- Map of Tennessee House districts with the 29th District shaded in red
Representative
| Greg Vital; R–Harrison |
since 2021
- Demographics: 72.3% White; 13.2% Black; 6.5% Hispanic; 3.3% Asian; 4.1% Multiracial
- Population (2024): 75,725

The Tennessee House of Representatives 29th district is one of the 99 legislative districts in the lower house of the Tennessee General Assembly. The district is located in East Tennessee and covers eastern Hamilton County. Greg Vital has represented the district since 2021.

== Geography ==
The district includes eastern parts of Chattanooga as well as Harrison and Collegedale. It also stretches north to include unincorporated areas along Chickamauga Lake such as Ooltewah and Birchwood. Said lake forms much of the western border of the district.

== Demographics ==
The Tennessee Comptroller estimates the population as of 2024 at 75,725.

- 72.3% of the district is White
- 13.2% of the district is Black
- 6.5% of the district is Hispanic
- 3.3% of the district is Asian
- 4.1% of the district is Two or more races

Detailed demographic information is also available through Census Reporter.

== History ==
The 88th Tennessee General Assembly was the first in which all districts were numbered. The 29th district has been in Hamilton County since its creation.

== List of Representatives ==
| Representative | Party | Years of Service | General Assembly | Hometown |
|---|---|---|---|---|
| Greg Vital | Republican | 2021 - present | 112th-114th | Harrison |
| Mike Carter | Republican | 2013-2020 | 108th-111th | Ooltewah |
| JoAnne Favors | Democratic | 2005-2013 | 104th-107th | Chattanooga |
| Brenda Turner | Democratic | 1985-2004 | 94th-103rd | Chattanooga |
| Bob Davis | Democratic | 1975-1984 | 89th-93rd | Chattanooga |
| William Carter | Republican | 1971-1974 | 87th-88th | Signal Mountain |
