= Tennessee House of Representatives 48th district =

State legislative district in Tennessee

Tennessee's 48th State House of Representatives district
- Map of Tennessee House districts with the 48th District shaded in red
Representative
Bryan Terry; R–Murfreesboro
- Demographics: 66.3% White; 15% Black; 11.2% Hispanic; 2% Asian; 1.1% Other; 4.1% Multiracial
- Population (2024): 76,133

The Tennessee House of Representatives 48th district is one of 99 legislative districts in the Tennessee House of Representatives. The district represents the east of Rutherford County. The district includes the eastern edge of Murfreesboro, affiliated suburbs, and many unincorporated communities east of Murfreesboro. These include Lascassas, Milton, Kittrell, and Christiana. It has been represented by Bryan Terry since 2015.

== Demographics ==
The Tennessee Comptroller estimates the population as of 2024 at 76,133.

- 66.3% of the district is White
- 15% of the district is Black
- 11.2% of the district is Hispanic
- 2% of the district is Asian
- 1.1% of the district is some other race
- 4.1% of the district is Two or more races

Detailed demographic information is also available through Census Reporter.

== History ==
From the 88th Tennessee General Assembly, districts were numbered. Since the creation of the district it has been part of Rutherford County. Prior, there was an unnumbered district for only Rutherford County. From the 102rd General Assembly it has been explicitly identified as the eastern portion of Rutherford County.

== List of representatives ==
Representative	Party	Years of service	General Assembly	Residence
Bryan Terry	Republican	2015–present	109th-114th	Murfreesboro
Joe S. Carr	Republican	2009–2014	106th-108th	Lascassas
John Hood	Democratic	1997-2008	100th-105th	Murfreesboro
John T. Bragg	Democratic	1971-1996	87th-99th	Murfreesboro
Ewing Smith Jr.	Democratic	1971-1996	86th	Murfreesboro
John T. Bragg	Democratic	1965-1968	84th-85th	Murfreesboro
