= Shane Reeves =

American politician (born 1968)

Member of the Tennessee Senate from the 14th district
- Incumbent
- Assumed office March 15, 2018
- Preceded by: Jim Tracy

Personal details
- Born: January 18, 1968 (age 58)
- Party: Republican
- Children: 3

Shane Reeves (January 18, 1968) is an American businessman, pharmacist and politician who is the State Senator for the 14th District of Tennessee, which is composed of Bedford County, Moore County, Cannon County, Tennessee and part of Rutherford County. Reeves campaigned as a conservative Republican in the Tennessee State Senate District 14 Special Election in 2018. The special election was mandated because of a vacant seat created by Jim Tracy's acceptance of Tennessee Director for Rural Development with the Trump Administration. Jim Tracy endorsed Shane Reeves. Prior to entering politics, Reeves co-owned Reeves-Sain Drug Store in Murfreesboro, TN, and after selling in 2015, he founded Twelvestone Health Partners in 2016.

== Early life and career ==
Reeves was born in Murfreesboro, TN, to Carolyn Reeves, a school teacher, and Richard Reeves, a small business man, city councilman and former mayor of Murfreesboro. Reeves graduated from Oakland High School and attended Middle Tennessee State University where he graduated with a Bachelor of Science in 1990. He began Pharmacy School at the University of Tennessee Memphis and graduated in 1994.

== Personal life ==
Reeves lives in Murfreesboro, TN, with his wife, Amanda. He is a deacon at North Blvd. Church of Christ.

Reeves is past Chairman for the Rutherford County Chamber of Commerce, past president of Leadership Rutherford, past board member in Leadership Middle Tennessee and past chairman for Tennessee’s National Federation of Independent Business (NFIB) leadership council. In 2005, he was honored as Tennessee’s small business champion by NFIB. In 2012, Reeves, and his partner, Rick Sain were given the “Business People of the Year” award from the Rutherford County Chamber of Commerce. In 2017, Reeves was invited to be part of the Fellows Program with the Nashville Healthcare Council. He has also been active in the Blue Raider Athletic Association, Alzheimer’s Association (past Memory walk Corporate Chair), American Heart Association (co-chair for Heart Ball in 2017), and the American Cancer Society

== Political career ==
Reeves announced his campaign for the Tennessee State Senate District 14 Special Election on November 7, 2017. Jim Tracy endorsed Reeves November 8, 2017. Reeves won the primary election against Joe Carr, with 64.87% of the vote. In March 2018, Reeves defeated Democrat Gayle Jordan in the general election, with 71.72% of the vote. Since taking office, Reeves has been elected Chaplain for the 111th General Assembly.

In January 2025, Reeves was appointed chairman of the Energy, Agriculture, and Natural Resources Committee by Lt. Governor McNally. Reeves also has served on the Senate Health and Welfare and Commerce and Labor Committee since 2018.

The Tennessee General Assembly has a full list of Reeves' Sponsored and Co-Sponsored Bills and Resolutions on its website.

== Awards ==
Tennessee’s Young Pharmacist of the year (2003)

Rutherford Chamber of Commerce "Business People of the Year" (2012)

The Center For The Arts' Arts Advocate of the Year Award (2021)

County Officials Association of Tennessee' Outstanding Senator Award (2021)

NFIB's Guardian of Small Business Award (2021)

Tennessee Hospital Association's Hospital Hero Award (2021)

Tennessee Licensed Professional Counselors Association's Legislator of the Year Award (2021)

Tennessee Federation for the Aging's Legislative Aging Champion Award (2022)

Tennessee Academy of Ophthalmology's Legislator of the Year Award (2022-2023)

Tennessee Legislative Action Committee Community Associations Institute's Condominium Hero Award (2023)

Tennessee Faith & Freedom Coalition's Defender of Freedom Award (2024)

Tennessee Association of Optometric Physicians' Legislative Leadership Award (2024)

Tennessee Veterinary Medical Association's Legislator of the Year Award (2024)

THCA/TNCAL Long-term Care Champion Award (2024)

Shelby Rhinehart Public Service Award (2025)

Tennessee Families for Vaccines' Vaccine Hero Award (2025)

Tennessee Environmental Council's Sustainable Tennessee Award (2026)

American Cancer Society Cancer Action Network's Champion Against Cancer Award (2026)

Tennessee Forestry Association's Legislator of the Year (2026)

Tennessee Nurses Political Action Committee's Legislator Nurse Champion Award (2026)

Friend of Tennessee Farm Bureau Recipient (2026)

Chronic Disease Coalition Legislative Champion (2026)
