= Tennessee House of Representatives 53rd district =

State legislative district in Tennessee

Tennessee's 53rd State House of Representatives district
- Map of Tennessee House districts with the 53rd District shaded in red
Representative
Jason Powell; D–Nashville
- Demographics: 51.4% White; 15.9% Black; 20.8% Hispanic; 6.6% Asian; 0.1% Native American; 0.1% Hawaiian/Pacific Islander; 0.6% Other; 4.5% Multiracial
- Population (2024): 80,164

The Tennessee House of Representatives 53nd district is one of 99 legislative districts in the Tennessee House of Representatives. The district represents south-central Davidson County. It consists of central and south Nashville neighborhoods, including areas surrounding the Nashville Zoo such as Radnor and Villages of Brentwood. From this focal point, it extends south following US Route 41-A until meeting with Tennessee State Route 254, spreading farther east to include Brookview Estates, Oak Highlands and more southeasterly locations around Mill Creek Greenway and Mitt Ridge Park. It has been represented by Jason Powell since 2013.

== Demographics ==
The Tennessee Comptroller estimates the population as of 2024 at 76,488.

- 38.8% of the district is White
- 32.8% of the district is African American
- 21.8% of the district is Hispanic
- 1.8% of the district is Asian
- 0.1% of the district is some other race
- 4.6% of the district is Two or more races

Detailed demographic information is also available through Census Reporter.

== List of representatives ==
Representative	Party	Years of service	General Assembly	Residence
Jason Powell	Democratic	2023–present	108th-114th	Nashville
Janis B. Sontany	Democratic	2003–2012	103rd-107th	Nashville
John Arriola	Democratic	1991-2002	97th-102nd	Nashville
Victor Ellis	Democratic	1973-1990	88th-96th	Nashville

== Electoral history ==
=== 2024 ===
2024 Tennessee House of Representatives election, District 53
Party	Candidate	Votes	%
Democratic	Jason Powell (incumbent)	14,004	62.47
Republican	Yog Nepal	7,494	33.43
Independent	Reuben Dockery	921	4.1
Total votes		22,419	100.00

=== 2022 ===
2022 Tennessee House of Representatives election, District 53
Party	Candidate	Votes	%
Democratic	Jason Powell	9,008	94.07
Republican	Dia Hart	4,619	33.86
Write-in		24	0.1
Total votes		13,641	100.00

=== 2020 ===
2020 Tennessee House of Representatives election, District 53
Party	Candidate	Votes	%
Democratic	Jason Powell	20,075	100.00
Total votes		20,075	100.00
