= Tennessee House of Representatives 64th district =

State legislative district in Tennessee

Tennessee's 64th State House of Representatives district
- Map of Tennessee House districts with the 64th District shaded in red
Representative
Scott Cepicky; R–Culleoka
since 2019
- Demographics: 74.1% White; 10.9% Black; 9.6% Hispanic; 1.2% Asian; 3.8% Multiracial
- Population (2024): 82,525

The Tennessee House of Representatives 64th district is one of the 99 legislative districts in the lower house of the Tennessee General Assembly. The district is located in Middle Tennessee and covers part of Maury County. The district includes most of Columbia and the south of Spring Hill. The rest of the district is largely rural and unincorporated. Scott Cepicky has represented the district since 2019.

== Demographics ==
The Tennessee Comptroller estimates the population as of 2024 at 82,525.

- 74.1% of the district is White
- 10.9% of the district is Black
- 9.6% of the district is Hispanic
- 1.2% of the district is Asian
- 3.8% of the district is Two or more races

Detailed demographic information is also available through Census Reporter.

== History ==
The 88th Tennessee General Assembly was the first in which all districts were numbered. From its creation, the 64th district has been part or all of Maury County. Prior, there was a district for Maury County without a number.

== List of Representatives ==
Representative	Party	Years of Service	General Assembly	Hometown
Scott Cepicky	Republican	2019-present	111th-114th	Culleoka
Sheila Butt	Republican	2011-2018	107th-111th	Columbia
Ty Cobb	Democratic	2009-2010	106th	Columbia
J. Thomas Dubois	Republican	2003-2008	103rd-105th	Columbia
Bobby Sands	Democratic	1997-2002	100th-102nd	Columbia
J. B. Napier	Democratic	1983-1996	93rd-99th	Columbia
William Richardson Jr.	Democratic	1975-1982	89th-92nd	Columbia
W. A. Richardson	Democratic	1953-1974	78th-88th	Culleoka
