= Tennessee House of Representatives 44th district =

State legislative district in Tennessee

Tennessee's 44th State House of Representatives district
- Map of Tennessee House districts with the 44th District shaded in red
Representative
William Lamberth; R–Portland
- Demographics: 85.4% White; 4.1% Black; 5.6% Hispanic; 1.4% Asian; 0.5% Other; 2.8% Multiracial
- Population (2024): 81,066

The Tennessee House of Representatives 44th district is one of 99 legislative districts in the Tennessee House of Representatives. The district represents the north of Sumner County. The district includes the towns of Portland, Westmoreland, and parts of Gallatin and White House. It has been represented by William Lamberth since 2013, who has also served as Majority Leader of the Tennessee House of Representatives since 2019.

== Demographics ==
The Tennessee Comptroller estimates the population as of 2024 at 81,066.

- 85.4% of the district is White
- 5.6% of the district is Hispanic
- 4.1% of the district is African American
- 1.4% of the district is Asian
- 0.5% of the district is some other race
- 2.8% of the district is Two or more races

Detailed demographic information is also available through Census Reporter.

== History ==
From the 88th Tennessee General Assembly, the district was numbered, making up parts of Macon and Sumner counties, prior there was a district for just Sumner County. At the time of the 94th GA to the 96th, the district's shape was changed to comprise parts of Macon, Sumner, and Trousdale counties. From the 97th General Assembly it has been a portion of Sumner County.

== List of representatives ==
Representative	Party	Years of service	General Assembly	Residence
William Lamberth	Republican	2013–present	108th-114th	Portland
Michael Ray McDonald	Democratic	1995–2012	99th-107th	Portland
Mayo Wix	Democratic	1981-1994	92nd-98th	Westmoreland
Jack Burnett	Democratic	1975-1980	89th-91st	Gallatin
Cecil L. Corley Jr.	Republican	1973-1974	88th	Gallatin
Melvin Briley	Democratic	1971-1972	87th	Portland
