= Tennessee House of Representatives 38th district =

State legislative district in Tennessee

Tennessee's 38th State House of Representatives district
- Map of Tennessee House districts with the 38th District shaded in red
Representative
Kelly Keisling; R–Byrdstown
since 2011
- Demographics: 93% White; 1% Black; 3% Hispanic; 0.2% Asian; 3% Multiracial
- Population (2024): 69,891

Tennessee House of Representatives District 38 is one of the 99 legislative districts in the lower house of the Tennessee General Assembly. The district is located in Middle and East Tennessee and covers Clay, Macon, Pickett, Scott and most of Fentress Counties. Kelly Keisling has represented the district since 2023.

== Geography ==
Spanning the northern Cumberland Plateau, the district is mostly rural, being one of the largest State House districts at 1,525 square miles. Dale Hollow Lake and the upper Cumberland River are defining water features.

== Demographics ==
The Tennessee Comptroller estimates the population as of 2024 at 69,891. The district's poverty level is notably high at 21.2%. Median household income sits at $50,021, compared to the Tennessee median of $69,595.

- 93.1% of the district is White
- 0.7% of the district is African American
- 3% of the district is Hispanic
- 0.2% of the district is Asian
- 2.8% of the district is Two or more races

Detailed demographic information is also available through Census Reporter.

== List of Representatives ==
Representative	Party	Years of Service	General Assembly	Hometown
Kelly Keisling	Republican	2011 – present	107th-114th	Byrdstown
Leslie Winningham	Democratic	1985 – 2010	94th-106th	Huntsville
Lincoln Davis	Democratic	1981 – 1984	92nd-93rd	Nashville
Robert T. Beaty	Republican	1979 – 1980	91st	Nashville
Hugh B. Dixon	Democratic	1969 – 1978	86th-90th	Nashville
