= Tennessee House of Representatives 73rd district =

State legislative district in Tennessee

Tennessee's 73rd State House of Representatives district
- Map of Tennessee House districts with the 73rd District shaded in red
Representative
Chris Todd; R–Jackson
since 2019
- Demographics: 65.3% White; 22.9% Black; 5.9% Hispanic; 1.2% Asian; 4.1% Multiracial
- Population (2024): 67,632

The Tennessee House of Representatives 73rd district is one of the 99 legislative districts in the lower house of the Tennessee General Assembly. The district is located in West Tennessee and covers part of Madison. The district includes Medon, Three Way, and much of Jackson. Outside of the area of Jackson it contains, it is largely rural. Chris Todd has represented the district since 2019.

== Demographics ==
The Tennessee Comptroller estimates the population as of 2024 at 67,632.

- 65.3% of the district is White
- 22.9% of the district is Black
- 5.9% of the district is Hispanic
- 1.2% of the district is Asian
- 0.4% of the district is some other race alone
- 4.1% of the district is Two or more races

Detailed demographic information is also available through Census Reporter.

== History ==
The 88th Tennessee General Assembly was the first in which all districts were numbered. At this time, the 73rd district was in Madison County. It has remained within it throughout its history.

== List of Representatives ==
Representative	Party	Years of Service	General Assembly	Hometown
Chris Todd	Republican	2019-present	111th-114th	Jackson
Jimmy Eldridge	Republican	2003-2018	103rd-110th	Jackson
Matt Kisber	Democratic	1983-2002	93rd-102nd	Jackson
Ken Baker	Republican	1979-1982	91st-92nd	Jackson
Roger Murray Jr.	Democratic	1973-1978	88th-90th	Jackson
