= Tennessee House of Representatives 61st district =

State legislative district in Tennessee

Tennessee's 61st State House of Representatives district
- Map of Tennessee House districts with the 61st District shaded in red
Representative
Gino Bulso; R–Brentwood
since 2023
- Demographics: 80.7% White; 3.4% Black; 4.3% Hispanic; 7.6% Asian; 3.4% Multiracial
- Population (2024): 76,331

The Tennessee House of Representatives 61st district is one of the 99 legislative districts in the lower house of the Tennessee General Assembly. The district is located in Middle Tennessee and covers part of Williamson County. The district includes parts of Brentwood and Franklin. The rest of the district is unincorporated and largely affluent suburbs and exurbs. Gino Bulso has represented the district since 2023.

== Demographics ==
The Tennessee Comptroller estimates the population as of 2024 at 76,331. Median household income is nearly double the Tennessee median of $69,595, at $136,128.

- 80.7% of the district is White
- 4.3% of the district is Hispanic
- 3.4% of the district is Black
- 7.6% of the district is Asian
- 3.4% of the district is Two or more races

Detailed demographic information is also available through Census Reporter.

== History ==
The 88th Tennessee General Assembly was the first in which all districts were numbered. At that time, the 61st district was part of Maury and Williamson counties. From the 91st-92nd GAs, it was part of Hickman, Maury, and Williamson counties. Since the 93rd General Assembly, it has been composed of part or all of Williamson County.

== List of Representatives ==
Representative	Party	Years of Service	General Assembly	Hometown
Gino Bulso	Republican	2023-present	113th-114th	Brentwood
Brandon Ogles	Republican	2019-2022	111th-112th	Franklin
Charles Sargent	Republican	1997-2018	100th-110th	Franklin
Clint Callicott	Republican	1989-1996	96th-99th	Franklin
Cliff Frensley	Republican	1979-1988	91st-95th	Franklin
Cletus W. McWilliams	Democratic	1971-1978	87th-90th	Franklin
