= Tennessee House of Representatives 51st district =

State legislative district in Tennessee

Tennessee's 51st State House of Representatives district
- Map of Tennessee House districts with the 51st District shaded in red
Representative
Aftyn Behn; D–Nashville
- Demographics: 65.8% White; 13% Black; 13.3% Hispanic; 2.6% Asian; 0.4% Other; 4.9% Multiracial
- Population (2024): 79,653

The Tennessee House of Representatives 51st district is one of 99 legislative districts in the Tennessee House of Representatives. The district represents central Davidson County. It includes much of the city center of Nashville around the state capitol. The district crosses the Cumberland River into East Nashville, reaching to include the neighorhoods of Rosebank, Dalewood, Haysboro and Montague. The district includes the Grand Ole Opry House, Nissan Stadium, Bridgestone Arena, and the Tennessee State Museum. It has been represented by Aftyn Behn since 2023.

== Demographics ==
The Tennessee Comptroller estimates the population as of 2024 at 76,430. The district has a high median income of $84,081 compared to the Tennessee median of $69,595

- 65.8% of the district is White
- 13.3% of the district is Hispanic
- 13% of the district is African American
- 2.6% of the district is Asian
- 0.4% of the district is some other race
- 4.9% of the district is Two or more races

Detailed demographic information is also available through Census Reporter.

== List of representatives ==
Representative	Party	Years of service	General Assembly	Residence
Aftyn Behn	Democratic	2023–present	113th-114th	Nashville
Carson W. Beck	Democratic	2015–2022	109th-112th	Nashville
Mike Turner	Democratic	2001-2014	102nd-108th	Old Hickory
C. Robb Robinson	Democratic	1969-2000	86th-101th	Madison
