= Tennessee House of Representatives 54th district =

State legislative district in Tennessee

Tennessee's 54th State House of Representatives district
- Map of Tennessee House districts with the 54th District shaded in red
Representative
Vincent Dixie; D–Nashville
- Demographics: 28.7% White; 51.3% Black; 11.4% Hispanic; 1.9% Asian; 0.1% Native American; 0.1% Hawaiian/Pacific Islander; 0.7% Other; 5.8% Multiracial
- Population (2024): 76,430

The Tennessee House of Representatives 54th district is one of 99 legislative districts in the Tennessee House of Representatives. The district represents north-central Davidson County. It consists of northern and western Nashville neighborhoods, including Cockrill Bend, Jordonia, Bordeaux, Buena Vista Estates, Parkwood Estates, Bellshire, and a portion of Whites Creek. It has been represented by Vincent Dixie since 2019.

== Demographics ==
The Tennessee Comptroller estimates the population as of 2024 at 76,430.

- 51.3% of the district is African American
- 28.7% of the district is White
- 11.4% of the district is Hispanic
- 1.9% of the district is Asian
- 0.1% of the district is some other race
- 5.8% of the district is Two or more races

Detailed demographic information is also available through Census Reporter.

== List of representatives ==
Representative	Party	Years of service	General Assembly	Residence
Vincent Dixie	Democratic	2019–present	111th-114th	Nashville
Brenda Gilmore	Democratic	2007–2018	105th-110th	Nashville
Edith Taylor Langster	Democratic	1995-2006	99th-104th	Nashville
Harold M. Love Sr.	Democratic	1969-1994	86th-98th	Nashville
