= Kevin Vaughan =

American politician (born 1962)

Member of the Tennessee House of Representatives from the 95th district
- Incumbent
- Assumed office August 24, 2017
- Preceded by: Mark Lovell

Personal details
- Born: April 30, 1962 (age 64)
- Party: Republican
- Spouse: Johnna Vaughan
- Children: 1
- Education: Memphis State University (BS)
- Website: House website Campaign website

Kevin Vaughan (born April 30, 1962) is an American real estate broker and politician from the state of Tennessee. A Republican, Vaughan has represented the 95th district of the Tennessee House of Representatives, based in Collierville in the suburbs of Memphis, since 2017.

== Career ==
In February 2017, Mark Lovell resigned from the 95th district of the Tennessee House of Representatives due to allegations of inappropriate sexual conduct, and a special election was called to replace him. Vaughan narrowly won the seven-way April Republican primary with 27% of the vote to his nearest opponent's 26%; he went on to easily win the June general election over Democrat Julie Byrd Ashworth with 62% of the vote. Vaughan was sworn in on August 24, 2017. Vaughan was overwhelmingly elected to his first full term in 2018 against Democrat Sanjeev Memula.

In 2023, Vaughan supported a resolution to expel three Democratic lawmakers from the legislature for violating decorum rules.

== Personal life ==
Vaughan lives in Collierville with his wife, Johnna, with whom he has two children.
