= Tennessee House of Representatives 87th district =

State legislative district in Tennessee

Tennessee's 87th State House of Representatives district
- Map of Tennessee House districts with the 87th District shaded in red
Representative
Karen Camper; D–Memphis
since 2007
- Demographics: 9.9% White; 74.4% Black; 12.9% Hispanic; 0.6% Asian; 1.9% Multiracial
- Population (2024): 70,358

The Tennessee House of Representatives 87th district is one of the 99 legislative districts in the lower house of the Tennessee General Assembly. The district is located in West Tennessee and covers part of south-central Shelby County. Karen Camper has represented the district since 2007.

== Geography ==
The district includes parts of South Memphis. It includes Graceland and areas south and east of it such as Whitehaven. It also stretches north and east around Memphis International Airport to include communities such as Oakville and Parkway Village.

== Demographics ==
The Tennessee Comptroller estimates the population as of 2024 at 70,358. Poverty rates are more than 2x the Tennessee median of 13.8%, at 29.8%.

- 74.4% of the district is Black
- 9.9% of the district is White
- 12.9% of the district is Hispanic
- 0.6% of the district is Asian
- 1.9% of the district is Two or more races

Detailed demographic information is also available through Census Reporter.

== History ==
Prior to numbered districts, the district that would become the 87th was the 6th district in Shelby County. The 88th Tennessee General Assembly was the first in which all districts were numbered. Since its creation, the 87th district has been in Shelby County.

== List of Representatives ==
Representative	Party	Years of Service	General Assembly	Hometown
Karen Camper	Democratic	2007-present	105th-114th	Memphis
Gary Rowe	Democratic	2005-2006	104th	Memphis
Kathryn Bowers	Democratic	1995-2004	99th-103rd	Memphis
Roscoe Dixon	Democratic	1983-1994	93rd-98th	Memphis
Ira H. Murphy	Democratic	1969-1982	86th-92nd	Memphis
J.O. Patterson Jr.	Democratic	1967-1968	85th	Memphis
John Maxwell Jr.	Democratic	1965-1966	84th	Memphis
Jack Morris III	Democratic	1963-1964	83rd	Memphis
Joe M. Pipkin	Democratic	1961-1962	82nd	Memphis
Gerald D. Murley	Democratic	1957-1960	80th-81st	Memphis
C. Frank Scott	Democratic	1951-1956	77th-79th	Memphis
