= Tennessee House of Representatives 47th district =

State legislative district in Tennessee

Tennessee's 47th State House of Representatives district
- Map of Tennessee House districts with the 47th District shaded in red
Representative
Rush Bricken; R–Tullahoma
since 2019
- Demographics: 86.9% White; 3.4% Black; 5.2% Hispanic; 1.2% Asian; 3% Multiracial
- Population (2024): 74,473

The Tennessee House of Representatives 47th district is one of the 99 legislative districts in the lower house of the Tennessee General Assembly. The district is located in Middle and covers all of Coffee and Grundy counties. The main settlements in the area are Tullahoma, Manchester, Altamont, and Gruetli-Laager. Rush Bricken has represented the district since 2019.

== Demographics ==
The Tennessee Comptroller estimates the population as of 2024 at 74,473.

- 86.9% of the district is White
- 5.2% of the district is Hispanic
- 3.4% of the district is African American
- 1.2% of the district is Asian
- 3% of the district is Two or more races

Detailed demographic information is also available through Census Reporter.

== History ==
The 88th Tennessee General Assembly was the first in which all districts were numbered. At this time, the 47th district was in Coffee, Grundy and Warren counties. Prior there was a floterial district consisting of Coffee, Franklin, and Grundy counties. From the 89th to 92nd GAs, the district also included Sequatchie County. During the 93rd GA it was made up of Coffee and Rutherford. From the 94th to 102nd GAs, it was Coffee, and part or all of Grundy counties. From the 103rd-112th it was made up of Coffee and part of Warren counties. It has been made up of all of Coffee and Grundy counties since the 113th General Assembly.

== List of Representatives ==
Representative	Party	Years of Service	General Assembly	Hometown
Rush Bricken	Republican	2019 - present	111th-114th	Tullahoma
Judd Matheny	Republican	2003 - 2018	103rd-110th	Tullahoma
Doyle Lewis Jr.	Democratic	1993 - 2002	98th-102rd	Manchester
Lane Curlee	Democratic	1985 - 1992	94th-97th	Tullahoma
Rabon W. Johnson	Democratic	1977 - 1984	90th-93rd	Manchester
J. Stanley Rogers	Democratic	1971 - 1976	87th-89th	Manchester
