= John Holsclaw Jr. =

American politician (born 1963)

Member of the Tennessee House of Representatives from the 4th district
- In office January 13, 2015 – November 5, 2024
- Preceded by: Kent Williams
- Succeeded by: Renea Jones

Personal details
- Born: May 24, 1963 (age 62)
- Political party: Republican
- Spouse: Sheralyn
- Children: 5
- Education: East Tennessee State University (BS)

John B. Holsclaw Jr. (born May 24, 1963) is an American politician. A Republican, he represented District 4, which includes Unicoi County and parts of Carter County, in the Tennessee House of Representatives.

== Education and career ==
Holsclaw Jr.graduated from Happy Valley High School in 1982. He received a B.S. degree in engineering from East Tennessee State University.

He is director of engineering for 40 Million Company and owns a jewelry store.

== Political career ==
Holsclaw Jr. has been serving since 2014. The last time he was elected was on November 6, 2018. Holsclaw received 17,651 votes in his last election.

=== Committees ===
Holsclaw Jr. is a chair on the Employee affairs Subcommittee. He is a member on the Commerce Committee, Business Committee, Consumer and Human Resources Committee, an Agriculture and Natural Resources Committee.

=== Bills sponsored ===
In the 111th General Assembly, Holsclaw Jr. sponsored the following bills.

- HB0043 Taxes, Exemption and Credits. Failed
- HB0073 Taxes, Hotel Motel. Passed May 2019
- HB0163 Autopsies.
- HB0164 Traffic Safety. Passed July 2019
- HB0324 Alcoholic Beverages
- Hb0569 Public Defenders
- HB0570 Hotels and Restaurants
- HB0571 Financial Responsibility Law. Passed May 2019
- HB1104 Courts, Administrative Office of the.
- HB1297 Beer
- HB1298 Recreational Areas

In 2023, the Tennessee House voted on motions to remove three sitting Democratic representatives — Gloria Johnson, Justin Jones, and Justin J. Pearson — for disrupting proceedings with a protest as citizens were at the capitol voicing their outrage over a mass shooting at a Nashville school that left six dead. Holsclaw voted in favor of all three resolutions: HR 63, to remove Pearson; HR 64, to remove Johnson; and HR 65, to remove Jones. Pearson and Jones were expelled, while Johnson was not.

== Community involvement ==
Holsclaw Jr. is a member of the National Rifle Association of America, the Carter County Republican Party, the Unicoi Kiwanis Club, the Elizabethton and Erwin Chamber of Commerce, and the Carter County Hunting and Fishing Club.

== Personal life ==
He is married to Sheralyn and they have 5 children. He is a member of the Church of Christ.
