= Tennessee House of Representatives 16th district =

State legislative district in Tennessee

Tennessee's 16th State House of Representatives district
- Map of Tennessee House districts with the 16th District shaded in red
Representative
Michele Carringer; R–Knoxville
since 2021
- Demographics: 83.9% White; 3.1% Black; 8.6% Hispanic; 1.4% Asian; 2.9% Multiracial
- Population (2024): 70,339

The Tennessee House of Representatives 16th district is one of the 99 legislative districts in the lower house of the Tennessee General Assembly. The district is located in East Tennessee and covers north-central Knox County. It includes northern suburbs of Knoxville such as Fountain City. It also includes the unincorporated communities of Powell, Halls Crossroads, and Heiskell. Michele Carringer has represented the district since 2021.

== Demographics ==
The Tennessee Comptroller estimates the population as of 2024 at 70,339.

- 83.9% of the district is White
- 3.1% of the district is Black
- 8.6% of the district is Hispanic
- 1.4% of the district is Asian
- 2.9% of the district is Two or more races

Detailed demographic information is also available through Census Reporter.

== History ==
The 88th Tennessee General Assembly was the first in which all districts were numbered. The 16th district has been in Knox County since its creation.

== List of Representatives ==
Representative	Party	Years of Service	General Assembly	Hometown
Michele Carringer	Republican	2021 - present	112th-116th	Knoxville
Bill Dunn	Republican	1995-2020	99th-111th	Knoxville
Charles Severance	Republican	1981-1994	92nd-98th	Knoxville
Steve Hall	Republican	1977-1980	90th-91st	Knoxville
Sandra Clark	Republican	1973-1976	88th-89th	Powell
