= Tennessee House of Representatives 55th district =

State legislative district in Tennessee

Tennessee's 55th State House of Representatives district
- Map of Tennessee House districts with the 55th District shaded in red
Representative
John Ray Clemmons; D–Nashville
- Demographics: 26.4% White; 30% Black; 31.7% Hispanic; 4.6% Asian; 0.1% Native American; 0.1% Hawaiian/Pacific Islander; 0.6% Other; 5.5% Multiracial
- Population (2024): 78,196

The Tennessee House of Representatives 55th district is one of 99 legislative districts in the Tennessee House of Representatives. The district represents south-central Davidson County. It consists of central and south Nashville neighborhoods, including the area stretching from Berry Hill to Antioch, following Interstate 24. It has been represented by John Ray Clemmons since 2013.

== Demographics ==
The Tennessee Comptroller estimates the population as of 2024 at 78,196.

- 31.7% of the district is Hispanic
- 30% of the district is African American
- 26.4% of the district is White
- 4.6% of the district is Asian
- 0.6% of the district is some other race
- 5.5% of the district is Two or more races

Detailed demographic information is also available through Census Reporter.

== List of representatives ==
Representative	Party	Years of service	General Assembly	Residence
John Ray Clemmons	Democratic	2015–present	109th-114th	Nashville
Gary Odom	Democratic	1987–2014	95th-108th	Nashville
Michael D. Murphy	Democratic	1971-1986	87th-94th	Nashville

== Electoral history ==
=== 2024 ===
2024 Tennessee House of Representatives election, District 55
Party	Candidate	Votes	%
Democratic	John Ray Clemmons	13,388	100.00
Total votes		13,388	100.00

=== 2022 ===
2022 Tennessee House of Representatives election, District 55
Party	Candidate	Votes	%
Democratic	John Ray Clemmons	7,551	95.51
Write-in		355	4.49
Total votes		13,641	100.00

=== 2020 ===
2020 Tennessee House of Representatives election, District 55
Party	Candidate	Votes	%
Democratic	John Ray Clemmons	25,707	100.00
Total votes		25,707	100.00
