= Tennessee House of Representatives 37th district =

State legislative district in Tennessee

Tennessee's 37th State House of Representatives district
- Map of Tennessee House districts with the 37th District shaded in red
Representative
Charlie Baum; R–Murfreesboro
- Demographics: 68.5% White; 12.1% Black; 10.5% Hispanic; 2.9% Asian; 0.5% Other; 5.4% Multiracial
- Population (2024): 70,853

The Tennessee House of Representatives 37th district is one of 99 legislative districts in the Tennessee House of Representatives. The district represents the middle of Rutherford County. The district includes portions of Smyrna, and Murfreesboro. It includes the campus of Middle Tennessee State University. It has been represented by Charlie Baum since 2019. The district is considered marginally competitive. In 2024, Donald Trump won the district by 22.8%

== Demographics ==
The Tennessee Comptroller estimates the population as of 2024 at 70,853.

- 68.5% of the district is White
- 12.1% of the district is Black
- 10.5% of the district is Hispanic
- 2.9% of the district is Asian
- 0.5% of the district is some other race
- 5.4% of the district is Two or more races

Detailed demographic information is also available through Census Reporter.

== History ==
From the 88th Tennessee General Assembly, districts were numbered. At that time the district was made up of Bledsoe, part of Marion, Sequatchie, Van Buren and Warren Counties. prior there was a floterial district in roughly the same area. At the time of the 94th GA, Grundy County was also added. From the 103rd to 107th GAs, it was made up of Sequatchie, Van Buren, Grundy, and Marion counties. From the 108th General Assembly it has been a portion of Rutherford County.

== List of representatives ==
Representative	Party	Years of service	General Assembly	Residence
Charlie Baum	Republican	2019–present	111th-114th	Murfreesboro
Dawn White	Republican	2013–2018	108th-110th	Murfreesboro
Bill Harmon	Democratic	2002-2012	103rd-107th	Dunlap
Shelby Rhinehart	Democratic	1971-2002	87th-102nd	Spencer
