= Tennessee House of Representatives 50th district =

State legislative district in Tennessee

Tennessee's 50th State House of Representatives district
- Map of Tennessee House districts with the 50th District shaded in red
Representative
Bo Mitchell; D–Bellevue
- Demographics: 70.8% White; 11.9% Black; 8.7% Hispanic; 4.4% Asian; 0.6% Other; 3.7% Multiracial
- Population (2024): 70,804

The Tennessee House of Representatives 50th district is one of 99 legislative districts in the Tennessee House of Representatives. It represents the western and northern edge of Davidson County. The district includes Goodlettsville, Joelton, Bellevue and other Nashville suburbs, exurbs, and connecting rural areas. It has been represented by Democrat Bo Mitchell since 2013. The district is considered highly competitive. In 2024, Kamala Harris won the district by 4.4%

== Demographics ==
The Tennessee Comptroller estimates the population as of 2024 at 70,804. The district's average household income is much higher than state averages.

- 70.8% of the district is White
- 11.9% of the district is African American
- 8.7% of the district is Hispanic
- 4.4% of the district is Asian
- 0.6% of the district is some other race
- 3.7% of the district is Two or more races

Detailed demographic information is also available through Census Reporter.

== List of representatives ==
Representative	Party	Years of service	General Assembly	Residence
Bo Mitchell	Democratic	2013–present	108th-114th	Nashville
Gary W. Moore Sr.	Democratic	2005–2012	104th-107th	Joelton
Tim Garrett	Democratic	1985–2004	94th-103rd	Goodlettsville
James R. McKinney	Democratic	1969-1984	86th-93rd	Madison

== Electoral history ==
=== 2024 ===
2024 Tennessee House of Representatives election, District 50
Party	Candidate	Votes	%
Democratic	Bo Mitchell (incumbent)	16,632	54.09
Republican	Jennifer Frensley Webb	14,117	45.91
Total votes		30,749	100.00

=== 2022 ===
2022 Tennessee House of Representatives election, District 50
Party	Candidate	Votes	%
Democratic	Bo Mitchell (incumbent)	12,086	100.00
Total votes		12,086	100.00

=== 2020 ===
2020 Tennessee House of Representatives election, District 50
Party	Candidate	Votes	%
Democratic	Bo Mitchell (incumbent)	23,658	100.00
Total votes		23,658	100.00

=== 2018 ===
2018 Tennessee House of Representatives election, District 50
Party	Candidate	Votes	%
Democratic	Bo Mitchell (incumbent)	15,926	56.66
Republican	Judd Cowan	12,182	43.34
Total votes		28,108	100.00

=== 2016 ===
2016 Tennessee House of Representatives election, District 50
Party	Candidate	Votes	%
Democratic	Bo Mitchell (incumbent)	15,188	52.28
Republican	Nathan Massey	13,861	47.72
Total votes		29,049	100.00

=== 2014 ===
2014 Tennessee House of Representatives election, District 50
Party	Candidate	Votes	%
Democratic	Bo Mitchell (incumbent)	9,109	51.21
Republican	Troy Brewer	8,680	48.79
Total votes		17,789	100.00

=== 2012 ===
2012 Tennessee House of Representatives election, District 50
Party	Candidate	Votes	%
Democratic	Bo Mitchell	13,208	50.30
Republican	Charles D. Williamson	13,052	49.70
Total votes		26,260	100.00

=== 2010 ===
2010 Tennessee House of Representatives election, District 50
Party	Candidate	Votes	%
Democratic	Gary W. Moore Sr. (incumbent)	8,753	54.27
Republican	Dave Hall	6,860	42.53
Independent	Dave Rosenberg	342	2.12
Independent	Nina Ground	173	1.07
Total votes		16,128	100.00

=== 2008 ===
2008 Tennessee House of Representatives election, District 50
Party	Candidate	Votes	%
Democratic	Gary W. Moore Sr. (incumbent)	18,345	100.00
Total votes		18,345	100.00

=== 2006 ===
2006 Tennessee House of Representatives election, District 50
Party	Candidate	Votes	%
Democratic	Gary W. Moore Sr. (incumbent)	12,216	100.00
Total votes		12,216	100.00

=== 2004 ===
2004 Tennessee House of Representatives election, District 50
Party	Candidate	Votes	%
Democratic	Gary W. Moore Sr.	15,148	66.7
Republican	Ken Berryhill	7,564	33.3
Total votes		22,712	100.00

=== 2002 ===
2002 Tennessee House of Representatives election, District 50
Party	Candidate	Votes	%
Democratic	Tim Garrett (incumbent)	13,648	100.00
Total votes		13,648	100.00

=== 2000 ===
2000 Tennessee House of Representatives election, District 50
Party	Candidate	Votes	%
Democratic	Tim Garrett (incumbent)	18,076	100.00
Total votes		18,076	100.00
