= 2022 Tennessee House of Representatives election =

- November 8, 2022

99 Seats in the Tennessee House of Representatives 50 seats needed for a majority
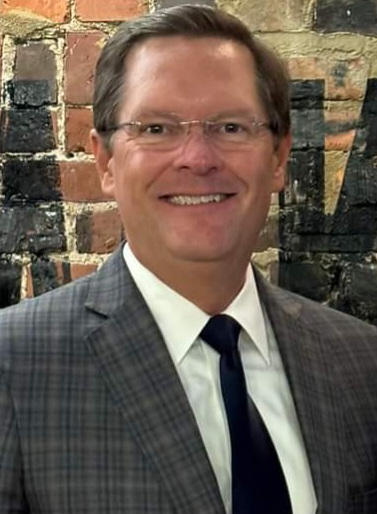

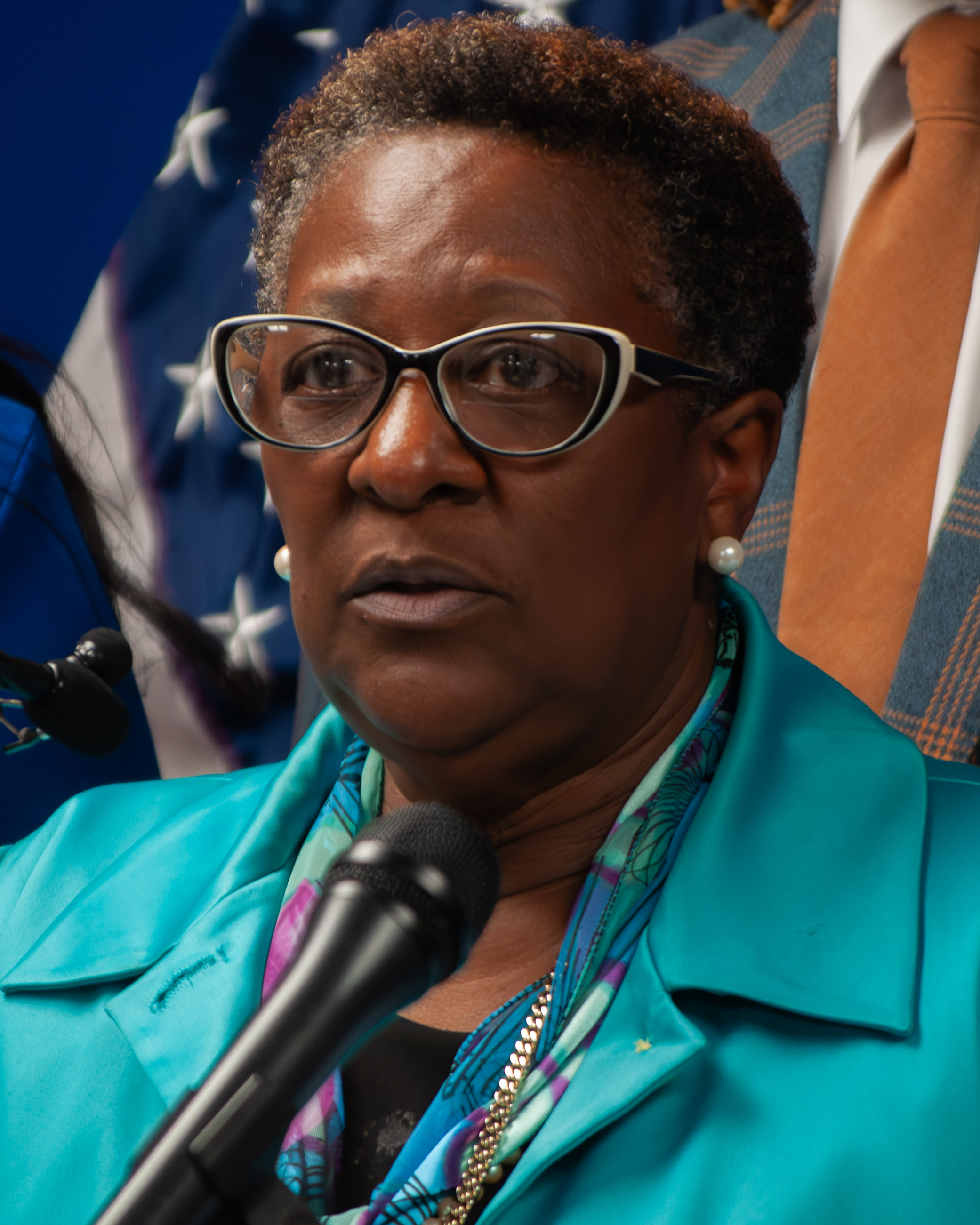

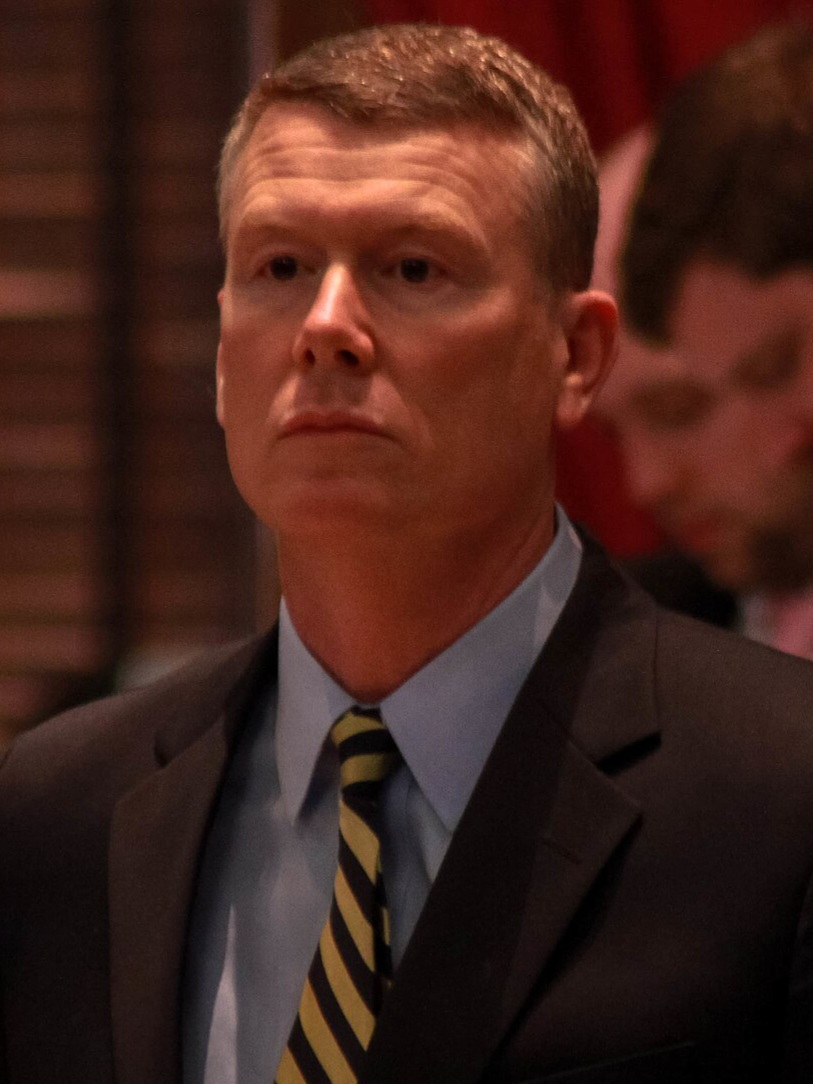
	Majority party	Minority party	Third party
Leader	Cameron Sexton	Karen Camper	John Windle (lost re-election)
Party	Republican	Democratic	Independent
Leader's seat	25th: Crossville	87th: Memphis	41st: Livingston
Last election	73 seats	26 seats	0 seats
Seats before	73	25	1
Seats won	75	24	0
Seat change	▲2	▼1	▼1
Popular vote	1,077,324	410,589	39,777
Percentage	70.48%	26.86%	2.60%
Swing	▲3.24%	▼4.06%	▲0.80%
- Republican gain Democratic hold Republican hold 50–60% 60–70% 70–80% 80–90% >90% 50–60% 60–70% 70–80% >90%
Speaker of the House before election
Cameron Sexton
Republican
Elected Speaker of the House
Cameron Sexton
Republican

The 2022 Tennessee House of Representatives election was held on November 8, 2022, to elect 99 seats for the Tennessee House of Representatives. The elections coincided with the governor, U.S. House, and State Senate elections.

In District 41, longtime Democratic incumbent John Windle filed to run as an independent after representing the district for nearly three decades; he was known for his support of Second Amendment rights, and reporting noted that Democratic Party leaders had considered removing him from the Democratic primary ballot because his positions were out of step with party leadership, prompting his decision to run as an independent. Windle was defeated by Republican Ed Butler in the general election.

Republicans gained two seats, thereby further expanding their supermajority in the state house.

== Partisan background ==
In the 2020 presidential election in Tennessee, Republican Donald Trump won 74 State House districts, while Democrat Joe Biden won 25 districts.

Leading up to the 2022 State House elections, a Democrat, who registered as an independent, represented a district that Trump won in 2020: District 41 in rural Tennessee (Trump +63.3%). Conversely, Republicans held one district that Biden carried in 2020: District 97 in Memphis (Biden +5.1%).

2020 presidential data by House district: Trump: 50–60%; 60–70%; 70–80%; 80–90%; Biden: 50–60%; 60–70%; 70–80%; 80–90%

== Retirements ==
=== Republicans ===
- District 18: Eddie Mannis retired.
- District 24: Mark Hall retired to run unsuccessfully for State Senate.
- District 32: Kent Calfee retired.
- District 35: Jerry Sexton retired.
- District 61: Brandon Ogles retired.
- District 63: Glen Casada retired to unsuccessfully run for Williamson County clerk.
- District 69: Michael Curcio retired.
- District 71: David Byrd retired.
- District 75: Bruce Griffey retired.
- District 79: Curtis Halford retired.

=== Democrats ===
- District 52: Mike Stewart retired.
- District 59: Jason Potts retired.
- District 67: Jason Hodges retired.

== Incumbents defeated ==
=== In the primary election ===
==== Republicans ====
- District 20: Bob Ramsey lost to Bryan Richey.
- District 40: Terri Lynn Weaver lost to Michael Hale.

=== In the general election ===
==== Independents ====
- District 41: John Windle lost re-election to Ed Butler.

== Predictions ==
Source	Ranking	As of
Sabato's Crystal Ball	Safe R	May 19, 2022

== Results summary ==
Summary of the November 8, 2022 Tennessee House election results
Party	Candidates	Votes		Seats	
Party	Candidates	No.	%	No.	+/–
Republican	81	1,077,324	70.48%	75	▲2
Democratic	54	410,589	26.86%	24	▼1
Independent	12	39,777	2.60%	0	▼1
Write-in		804	0.05%	0	Steady
Total		1,528,494	100.00%	99	Steady

Popular vote
Republican	70.48%
Democratic	26.86%
Independent	2.60%
Write-ins	0.05%

House seats
Republican	75.76%
Democratic	24.24%

=== Closest races ===
Four races were decided by a margin of 10% or less:

District	Winner	Margin
District 67	Democratic	1.34%
District 59	Democratic	4.76%
District 41	Republican (flip)	5.18%
District 18	Republican	8.22%

== Overview ==
District	Incumbent			Results	Candidates
District	Representative	Party	Electoral history	Results	Candidates
District 1	John Crawford	Republican	2016	Incumbent re-elected.	▌ ✓ John Crawford (Republican)
District 2	Bud Hulsey	Republican	2014	Incumbent re-elected.	▌ ✓ Bud Hulsey (Republican)
District 3	Scotty Campbell	Republican	2020	Incumbent re-elected.	▌ ✓ Scotty Campbell (Republican)
District 4	John Holsclaw Jr.	Republican	2014	Incumbent re-elected.	▌ ✓ John Holsclaw Jr. (Republican)
District 5	David Hawk	Republican	2002	Incumbent re-elected.	▌ ✓ David Hawk (Republican)
District 6	Tim Hicks	Republican	2020	Incumbent re-elected.	▌ ✓ Tim Hicks (Republican); ▌Joel Goodman (Independent)
District 7	Rebecca Alexander	Republican	2020	Incumbent re-elected.	▌ ✓ Rebecca Alexander (Republican)
District 8	Jerome Moon	Republican	2017	Incumbent re-elected.	▌ ✓ Jerome Moon (Republican); ▌Dylan D. Kelley (Democratic)
District 9	Gary Hicks	Republican	2016	Incumbent re-elected.	▌ ✓ Gary Hicks (Republican)
District 10	Rick Eldridge	Republican	2018	Incumbent re-elected.	▌ ✓ Rick Eldridge (Republican)
District 11	Jeremy Faison	Republican	2010	Incumbent re-elected.	▌ ✓ Jeremy Faison (Republican)
District 12	Dale Carr	Republican	2012	Incumbent re-elected.	▌ ✓ Dale Carr (Republican); ▌Larry Linton (Independent)
District 13	None (New seat)			New seat. New member elected. Republican gain.	▌ ✓ Robert Stevens (Republican); ▌Jeffrey Young Crum (Democratic)
District 14	Jason Zachary	Republican	2015	Incumbent re-elected.	▌ ✓ Jason Zachary (Republican); ▌Amanda Collins (Democratic)
District 15	Sam McKenzie	Democratic	2020	Incumbent re-elected.	▌ ✓ Sam McKenzie (Democratic); ▌Pete Drew (Republican)
District 16	Michele Carringer	Republican	2020	Incumbent re-elected.	▌ ✓ Michele Carringer (Republican)
District 17	Andrew Farmer	Republican	2012	Incumbent re-elected.	▌ ✓ Andrew Farmer (Republican)
District 18	Eddie Mannis	Republican	2020	Incumbent retired. New member elected. Republican hold.	▌ ✓ Elaine Davis (Republican); ▌Gregory B. Kaplan (Democratic)
District 19	Dave Wright; Redistricted from the 18th district	Republican	2018	Incumbent re-elected.	▌ ✓ Dave Wright (Republican); ▌Zeke Streetman (Democratic); ▌Mary Ann Rochat (Independent)
District 20	Bob Ramsey	Republican	2008	Incumbent lost renomination. New member elected. Republican hold.	▌ ✓ Bryan Richey (Republican)
District 21	Lowell Russell	Republican	2018	Incumbent re-elected.	▌ ✓ Lowell Russell (Republican)
District 22	Dan Howell	Republican	2014	Incumbent re-elected.	▌ ✓ Dan Howell (Republican)
District 23	Mark Cochran	Republican	2018	Incumbent re-elected.	▌ ✓ Mark Cochran (Republican)
District 24	Mark Hall	Republican	2018	Incumbent retired to run for State Senate. New member elected. Republican hold.	▌ ✓ Kevin D. Raper (Republican)
District 25	Cameron Sexton	Republican	2010	Incumbent re-elected.	▌ ✓ Cameron Sexton (Republican); ▌Anne Ferrell Quillen (Democratic)
District 26	Greg Martin	Republican	2022 (appointed)	Incumbent elected.	▌ ✓ Greg Martin (Republican); ▌Allison Gorman (Democratic)
District 27	Patsy Hazlewood	Republican	2014	Incumbent re-elected.	▌ ✓ Patsy Hazlewood (Republican); ▌Michael H. Potter (Independent)
District 28	Yusuf Hakeem	Democratic	2018	Incumbent re-elected.	▌ ✓ Yusuf Hakeem (Democratic)
District 29	Greg Vital	Republican	2021	Incumbent re-elected.	▌ ✓ Greg Vital (Republican)
District 30	Esther Helton	Republican	2018	Incumbent re-elected.	▌ ✓ Esther Helton (Republican)
District 31	Ron Travis	Republican	2012	Incumbent re-elected.	▌ ✓ Ron Travis (Republican); ▌David Brown (Democratic)
District 32	Kent Calfee	Republican	2012	Incumbent retired. New member elected. Republican hold.	▌ ✓ Monty Fritts (Republican); ▌Jan Hahn (Democratic)
District 33	John Ragan	Republican	2010	Incumbent re-elected.	▌ ✓ John Ragan (Republican); ▌Jim Dodson (Democratic)
District 34	Tim Rudd	Republican	2016	Incumbent re-elected.	▌ ✓ Tim Rudd (Republican); ▌Laura Bohling (Democratic)
District 35	Jerry Sexton	Republican	2014	Incumbent retired. New member elected. Republican hold.	▌ ✓ William Slater (Republican)
District 36	Dennis Powers	Republican	2010	Incumbent re-elected.	▌ ✓ Dennis Powers (Republican)
District 37	Charlie Baum	Republican	2018	Incumbent re-elected.	▌ ✓ Charlie Baum (Republican); ▌Bill Levine (Democratic)
District 38	Kelly Keisling	Republican	2010	Incumbent re-elected.	▌ ✓ Kelly Keisling (Republican)
District 39	Iris Rudder	Republican	2018	Incumbent re-elected.	▌ ✓ Iris Rudder (Republican); ▌Bruce Manuel (Democratic)
District 40	Terri Lynn Weaver	Republican	2008	Incumbent lost renomination. New member elected. Republican hold.	▌ ✓ Michael Hale (Republican); ▌Tom Cook (Democratic)
District 41	John Windle	Independent	1990	Incumbent lost re-election. New member elected. Republican gain.	▌ ✓ Ed Butler (Republican); ▌John Windle (Independent)
District 42	Ryan Williams	Republican	2010	Incumbent re-elected.	▌ ✓ Ryan Williams (Republican)
District 43	Paul Sherrell	Republican	2016	Incumbent re-elected.	▌ ✓ Paul Sherrell (Republican); ▌Cheryl Womack Uselton (Democratic)
District 44	William Lamberth	Republican	2012	Incumbent re-elected.	▌ ✓ William Lamberth (Republican); ▌Kesa Fowler (Democratic)
District 45	Johnny Garrett	Republican	2018	Incumbent re-elected.	▌ ✓ Johnny Garrett (Republican)
District 46	Clark Boyd	Republican	2018	Incumbent re-elected.	▌ ✓ Clark Boyd (Republican)
District 47	Rush Bricken	Republican	2018	Incumbent re-elected.	▌ ✓ Rush Bricken (Republican); ▌Veronica Owens (Independent)
District 48	Bryan Terry	Republican	2018	Incumbent re-elected.	▌ ✓ Bryan Terry (Republican); ▌Matt Ferry (Democratic)
District 49	Mike Sparks	Republican	2018	Incumbent re-elected.	▌ ✓ Mike Sparks (Republican); ▌Morgan Woodberry (Democratic)
District 50	Bo Mitchell	Democratic	2012	Incumbent re-elected.	▌ ✓ Bo Mitchell (Democratic)
District 51	Bill Beck	Democratic	2014	Incumbent re-elected.	▌ ✓ Bill Beck (Democratic)
District 52	Mike Stewart	Democratic	2008	Incumbent retired. New member elected. Democratic hold.	▌ ✓ Justin Jones (Democratic)
District 53	Jason Powell	Democratic	2012	Incumbent re-elected.	▌ ✓ Jason Powell (Democratic); ▌Dia Hart (Republican)
District 54	Vincent Dixie	Democratic	2018	Incumbent re-elected.	▌ ✓ Vincent Dixie (Democratic)
District 55	John Ray Clemmons	Democratic	2014	Incumbent re-elected.	▌ ✓ John Ray Clemmons (Democratic)
District 56	Bob Freeman	Democratic	2018	Incumbent re-elected.	▌ ✓ Bob Freeman (Democratic)
District 57	Susan Lynn	Republican	2013	Incumbent re-elected.	▌ ✓ Susan Lynn (Republican)
District 58	Harold M. Love Jr.	Democratic	2012	Incumbent re-elected.	▌ ✓ Harold M. Love Jr. (Democratic)
District 59	Jason Potts	Democratic	2018	Incumbent retired. New member elected. Democratic hold.	▌ ✓ Caleb Hemmer (Democratic); ▌Michelle Foreman (Republican)
District 60	Darren Jernigan	Democratic	2012	Incumbent re-elected.	▌ ✓ Darren Jernigan (Democratic); ▌Christopher Huff (Republican)
District 61	Brandon Ogles	Republican	2018	Incumbent retired. New member elected. Republican hold.	▌ ✓ Gino Bulso (Republican); ▌Steven Cervantes (Democratic)
District 62	Pat Marsh	Republican	2009	Incumbent re-elected.	▌ ✓ Pat Marsh (Republican)
District 63	Glen Casada	Republican	2001	Incumbent retired to run for Williamson County Clerk. New member elected. Republican hold.	▌ ✓ Jake McCalmon (Republican); ▌Kisha Davis (Democratic)
District 64	Scott Cepicky	Republican	2018	Incumbent re-elected.	▌ ✓ Scott Cepicky (Republican); ▌Jameson Manor (Democratic)
District 65	Sam Whitson	Republican	2016	Incumbent re-elected.	▌ ✓ Sam Whitson (Republican)
District 66	Sabi "Doc" Kumar	Republican	2014	Incumbent re-elected.	▌ ✓ Sabi "Doc" Kumar (Republican)
District 67	Jason Hodges	Democratic	2018	Incumbent retired. New member elected. Democratic hold.	▌ ✓ Ronnie Glynn (Democratic); ▌Tommy Vallejos, Sr. (Republican)
District 68	Curtis Johnson	Republican	2014	Incumbent re-elected.	▌ ✓ Curtis Johnson (Republican); ▌Monica Meeks (Independent)
District 69	Michael Curcio	Republican	2018	Incumbent retired. New member elected. Republican hold.	▌ ✓ Jody Barrett (Republican); ▌Candie Hedge (Democratic); ▌Leonard (Lenny) Ladner (Independent)
District 70	Clay Doggett	Republican	2018	Incumbent re-elected.	▌ ✓ Clay Doggett (Republican)
District 71	David Byrd	Republican	2014	Incumbent retired. New member elected. Republican hold.	▌ ✓ Kip Capley (Republican); ▌David Carson II (Democratic)
District 72	Kirk Haston	Republican	2018	Incumbent re-elected.	▌ ✓ Kirk Haston (Republican)
District 73	Chris Todd	Republican	2018	Incumbent re-elected.	▌ ✓ Chris Todd (Republican); ▌Erica Coleman (Democratic)
District 74	Jay Reedy	Republican	2014	Incumbent re-elected.	▌ ✓ Jay Reedy (Republican)
District 75	Bruce Griffey	Republican	2018	Incumbent retired. New member elected. Republican hold.	▌ ✓ Jeff Burkhart (Republican)
District 76	Tandy Darby	Republican	2020	Incumbent re-elected.	▌ ✓ Tandy Darby (Republican); ▌James Hart (Independent); ▌Kevin West (Independent)
District 77	Rusty Grills	Republican	2020	Incumbent re-elected.	▌ ✓ Rusty Grills (Republican)
District 78	Mary Littleton	Republican	2012	Incumbent re-elected.	▌ ✓ Mary Littleton (Republican); ▌Krystle James (Democratic)
District 79	Curtis Halford	Republican	2018	Incumbent retired. New member elected. Republican hold.	▌ ✓ Brock Martin (Republican); ▌Thomas Jefferson (Democratic)
District 80	Johnny Shaw	Democratic	2000	Incumbent re-elected.	▌ ✓ Johnny Shaw (Democratic)
District 81	Debra Moody	Republican	2012	Incumbent re-elected.	▌ ✓ Debra Moody (Republican); ▌Nicholas Sawall (Independent)
District 82	Chris Hurt	Republican	2018	Incumbent re-elected.	▌ ✓ Chris Hurt (Republican)
District 83	Mark White	Republican	2010	Incumbent re-elected.	▌ ✓ Mark White (Republican)
District 84	Joe Towns	Democratic	1994	Incumbent re-elected.	▌ ✓ Joe Towns (Democratic)
District 85	Jesse Chism	Democratic	2018	Incumbent re-elected.	▌ ✓ Jesse Chism (Democratic)
District 86	Barbara Cooper	Democratic	1996	Incumbent re-elected.	▌ ✓ Barbara Cooper (Democratic); ▌Michael Porter (Independent)
District 87	Karen Camper	Democratic	2008	Incumbent re-elected.	▌ ✓ Karen Camper (Democratic)
District 88	Larry Miller	Democratic	2008	Incumbent re-elected.	▌ ✓ Larry Miller (Democratic)
District 89	Justin Lafferty	Republican	2018	Incumbent re-elected.	▌ ✓ Justin Lafferty (Republican); ▌M.D. Dotson (Democratic)
District 90	Gloria Johnson; Redistricted from the 13th district	Democratic	2018	Incumbent re-elected.	▌ ✓ Gloria Johnson (Democratic); ▌David "Pozy" Poczobut (Republican)
District 91	Torrey Harris; Redistricted from the 90th district	Democratic	2020	Incumbent re-elected.	▌ ✓ Torrey Harris (Democratic)
District 92	Todd Warner	Republican	2020	Incumbent re-elected.	▌ ✓ Todd Warner (Republican); ▌Angela Hughes (Democratic)
District 93	G. A. Hardaway	Democratic	2006	Incumbent re-elected.	▌ ✓ G. A. Hardaway (Democratic)
District 94	Ron Gant	Republican	2016	Incumbent re-elected.	▌ ✓ Ron Gant (Republican)
District 95	Kevin Vaughan	Republican	2017	Incumbent re-elected.	▌ ✓ Kevin Vaughan (Republican); ▌Patricia Causey (Democratic)
District 96	Dwayne Thompson	Democratic	2016	Incumbent re-elected.	▌ ✓ Dwayne Thompson (Democratic)
District 97	John Gillespie	Republican	2017	Incumbent re-elected.	▌ ✓ John Gillespie (Republican); ▌Toniko S. Harris (Democratic)
District 98	Antonio Parkinson	Democratic	2011	Incumbent re-elected.	▌ ✓ Antonio Parkinson (Democratic)
District 99	Tom Leatherwood	Republican	2018	Incumbent re-elected.	▌ ✓ Tom Leatherwood (Republican)

== Results ==
=== District 1 ===
Republican primary
Party	Candidate	Votes	%
Republican	John Crawford (incumbent)	1,825	100.00%
Total votes		1,825	100.00%

Tennessee House of Representatives District 1 general election, 2022
Party	Candidate	Votes	%
Republican	John Crawford (incumbent)	13,370	99.29%
Write-in		96	0.71%
Total votes		13,466	100.00%
Republican hold			

=== District 2 ===
Republican primary
Party	Candidate	Votes	%
Republican	Bud Hulsey (incumbent)	2,986	100.00%
Total votes		2,986	100.00%

Tennessee House of Representatives District 2 general election, 2022
Party	Candidate	Votes	%
Republican	Bud Hulsey (incumbent)	15,359	99.59%
Write-in		63	0.41%
Total votes		15,422	100.00%
Republican hold			

=== District 3 ===
Republican primary
Party	Candidate	Votes	%
Republican	Scotty Campbell (incumbent)	5,758	100.00%
Total votes		5,758	100.00%

Tennessee House of Representatives District 3 general election, 2022
Party	Candidate	Votes	%
Republican	Scotty Campbell (incumbent)	15,667	99.81%
Independent	Arvil Love (write-in)	30	0.19%
Total votes		15,697	100.00%
Republican hold			

=== District 4 ===
Republican primary
Party	Candidate	Votes	%
Republican	John B. Holsclaw Jr (incumbent)	5,362	100.00%
Total votes		5,362	100.00%

Tennessee House of Representatives District 4 general election, 2022
Party	Candidate	Votes	%
Republican	John B. Holsclaw Jr (incumbent)	14,882	100.00%
Total votes		14,882	100.00%
Republican hold			

=== District 5 ===
Republican primary
Party	Candidate	Votes	%
Republican	David B. Hawk (incumbent)	3,197	100.00%
Total votes		3,197	100.00%

Tennessee House of Representatives District 5 general election, 2022
Party	Candidate	Votes	%
Republican	David B. Hawk (incumbent)	14,852	100.00%
Total votes		14,852	100.00%
Republican hold			

=== District 6 ===
Republican primary
Party	Candidate	Votes	%
Republican	Tim Hicks (incumbent)	3,980	100.00%
Total votes		3,980	100.00%

Tennessee House of Representatives District 6 general election, 2022
Party	Candidate	Votes	%
Republican	Tim Hicks (incumbent)	13,980	76.55%
Independent	Joel Goodman	4,283	23.45%
Total votes		18,263	100.00%
Republican hold			

=== District 7 ===
Republican primary
Party	Candidate	Votes	%
Republican	Rebecca K. Alexander (incumbent)	3,895	100.00%
Total votes		3,895	100.00%

Tennessee House of Representatives District 7 general election, 2022
Party	Candidate	Votes	%
Republican	Rebecca K. Alexander (incumbent)	12,411	100.00%
Total votes		12,411	100.00%
Republican hold			

=== District 8 ===
Republican primary
Party	Candidate	Votes	%
Republican	Jerome Moon (incumbent)	4,331	100.00%
Total votes		4,331	100.00%

Democratic primary
Party	Candidate	Votes	%
Democratic	Dylan D. Kelley	1,191	100.00%
Total votes		1,191	100.00%

Tennessee House of Representatives District 8 general election, 2022
Party	Candidate	Votes	%
Republican	Jerome Moon (incumbent)	15,702	78.85%
Democratic	Dylan D. Kelley	3,846	19.31%
Independent	Sue DuBois (write-in)	365	1.83%
Total votes		19,913	100.00%
Republican hold			

=== District 9 ===
Republican primary
Party	Candidate	Votes	%
Republican	Gary W Hicks Jr (incumbent)	5,905	100.00%
Total votes		5,905	100.00%

Tennessee House of Representatives District 9 general election, 2022
Party	Candidate	Votes	%
Republican	Gary W Hicks Jr (incumbent)	13,100	100.00%
Total votes		13,100	100.00%
Republican hold			

=== District 10 ===
Republican primary
Party	Candidate	Votes	%
Republican	Rick Eldridge (incumbent)	3,203	74.70%
Republican	Donel Shelton	1,085	25.30%
Total votes		4,288	100.00%

Tennessee House of Representatives District 10 general election, 2022
Party	Candidate	Votes	%
Republican	Rick Eldridge (incumbent)	12,258	99.05%
Independent	Alex Harbaugh (write-in)	118	0.95%
Total votes		12,376	100.00%
Republican hold			

=== District 11 ===
Republican primary
Party	Candidate	Votes	%
Republican	Jeremy Faison (incumbent)	6,513	100.00%
Total votes		6,513	100.00%

Tennessee House of Representatives District 11 general election, 2022
Party	Candidate	Votes	%
Republican	Jeremy Faison (incumbent)	13,522	99.08%
Independent	Joseph Winchester Stout (write-in)	126	0.92%
Total votes		13,648	100.00%
Republican hold			

=== District 12 ===
Republican primary
Party	Candidate	Votes	%
Republican	Dale Carr (incumbent)	2,028	100.00%
Total votes		2,028	100.00%

Tennessee House of Representatives District 12 general election, 2022
Party	Candidate	Votes	%
Republican	Dale Carr (incumbent)	12,646	81.86%
Independent	Larry Linton	2,796	18.10%
Independent	Mariah Marie Mercedes Bailey (write-in)	6	0.04%
Total votes		15,448	100.00%
Republican hold			

=== District 13 ===
Republican primary
Party	Candidate	Votes	%
Republican	Robert Stevens	2,062	60.19%
Republican	Gabriel Fancher	1,364	39.81%
Total votes		3,426	100.00%

Democratic primary
Party	Candidate	Votes	%
Democratic	Jeff Crum	1,499	100.00%
Total votes		1,499	100.00%

Tennessee House of Representatives District 13 general election, 2022
Party	Candidate	Votes	%
Republican	Robert Stevens	8,672	62.02%
Democratic	Jeff Crum	5,311	37.98%
Total votes		13,983	100.00%
Republican win (new seat)			

=== District 14 ===
Republican primary
Party	Candidate	Votes	%
Republican	Jason Zachary (incumbent)	6,361	100.00%
Total votes		6,361	100.00%

Democratic primary
Party	Candidate	Votes	%
Democratic	Amanda Collins	3,204	100.00%
Total votes		3,204	100.00%

Tennessee House of Representatives District 14 general election, 2022
Party	Candidate	Votes	%
Republican	Jason Zachary (incumbent)	16,661	64.36%
Democratic	Amanda Collins	9,227	35.64%
Total votes		25,888	100.00%
Republican hold			

=== District 15 ===
Republican primary
Party	Candidate	Votes	%
Republican	Pete Drew	1,047	100.00%
Total votes		1,047	100.00%

Democratic primary
Party	Candidate	Votes	%
Democratic	Sam McKenzie (incumbent)	3,104	100.00%
Total votes		3,104	100.00%

Tennessee House of Representatives District 15 general election, 2022
Party	Candidate	Votes	%
Democratic	Sam McKenzie (incumbent)	7,246	70.98%
Republican	Pete Drew	2,963	29.02%
Total votes		10,209	100.00%
Democratic hold			

=== District 16 ===
Republican primary
Party	Candidate	Votes	%
Republican	Michele Carringer (incumbent)	4,575	100.00%
Total votes		4,575	100.00%

Tennessee House of Representatives District 16 general election, 2022
Party	Candidate	Votes	%
Republican	Michele Carringer (incumbent)	13,852	100.00%
Total votes		13,852	100.00%
Republican hold			

=== District 17 ===
Republican primary
Party	Candidate	Votes	%
Republican	Andrew Ellis Farmer (incumbent)	2,604	100.00%
Total votes		2,604	100.00%

Tennessee House of Representatives District 17 general election, 2022
Party	Candidate	Votes	%
Republican	Andrew Ellis Farmer (incumbent)	13,085	100.00%
Total votes		13,085	100.00%
Republican hold			

=== District 18 ===
Republican primary
Party	Candidate	Votes	%
Republican	Elaine Davis	3,529	55.89%
Republican	Janet Testerman	2,785	44.11%
Total votes		6,314	100.00%

Democratic primary
Party	Candidate	Votes	%
Democratic	Gregory B. Kaplan	3,780	100.00%
Total votes		3,780	100.00%

Tennessee House of Representatives District 18 general election, 2022
Party	Candidate	Votes	%
Republican	Elaine Davis	11,604	54.10%
Democratic	Gregory B. Kaplan	9,846	45.90%
Total votes		21,450	100.00%
Republican hold			

=== District 19 ===
Republican primary
Party	Candidate	Votes	%
Republican	Dave Wright (incumbent)	4,261	100.00%
Total votes		4,261	100.00%

Democratic primary
Party	Candidate	Votes	%
Democratic	Zeke Streetman	1,447	100.00%
Total votes		1,447	100.00%

Tennessee House of Representatives District 19 general election, 2022
Party	Candidate	Votes	%
Republican	Dave Wright (incumbent)	13,181	74.76%
Democratic	Zeke Streetman	3,823	21.68%
Independent	Mary Ann Rochat	626	3.55%
Total votes		17,630	100.00%
Republican hold			

=== District 20 ===
Republican primary
Party	Candidate	Votes	%
Republican	Bryan Richey	3,803	64.84%
Republican	Bob Ramsey (incumbent)	2,062	35.16%
Total votes		5,865	100.00%

Tennessee House of Representatives District 20 general election, 2022
Party	Candidate	Votes	%
Republican	Bryan Richey	14,568	100.00%
Total votes		14,568	100.00%
Republican hold			

=== District 21 ===
Republican primary
Party	Candidate	Votes	%
Republican	Lowell Russell (incumbent)	6,790	100.00%
Total votes		6,790	100.00%

Tennessee House of Representatives District 21 general election, 2022
Party	Candidate	Votes	%
Republican	Lowell Russell (incumbent)	18,442	100.00%
Total votes		18,442	100.00%
Republican hold			

=== District 22 ===
Republican primary
Party	Candidate	Votes	%
Republican	Dan Howell (incumbent)	5,997	100.00%
Total votes		5,997	100.00%

Tennessee House of Representatives District 22 general election, 2022
Party	Candidate	Votes	%
Republican	Dan Howell (incumbent)	15,543	100.00%
Total votes		15,543	100.00%
Republican hold			

=== District 23 ===
Republican primary
Party	Candidate	Votes	%
Republican	Mark Cochran (incumbent)	5,815	100.00%
Total votes		5,815	100.00%

Tennessee House of Representatives District 23 general election, 2022
Party	Candidate	Votes	%
Republican	Mark Cochran (incumbent)	14,393	100.00%
Total votes		14,393	100.00%
Republican hold			

=== District 24 ===
Republican primary
Party	Candidate	Votes	%
Republican	Kevin D. Raper	2,170	38.70%
Republican	Troy Weathers	1,924	34.31%
Republican	Israel David Farless	783	13.96%
Republican	Rex Wagner	730	13.02%
Total votes		5,607	100.00%

Tennessee House of Representatives District 24 general election, 2022
Party	Candidate	Votes	%
Republican	Kevin D. Raper	12,448	100.00%
Total votes		12,448	100.00%
Republican hold			

=== District 25 ===
Republican primary
Party	Candidate	Votes	%
Republican	Cameron Sexton (incumbent)	7,893	100.00%
Total votes		7,893	100.00%

Democratic primary
Party	Candidate	Votes	%
Democratic	Anne Quillen	1,211	100.00%
Total votes		1,211	100.00%

Tennessee House of Representatives District 25 general election, 2022
Party	Candidate	Votes	%
Republican	Cameron Sexton (incumbent)	19,657	82.79%
Democratic	Anne Quillen	4,088	17.21%
Total votes		23,745	100.00%
Republican hold			

=== District 26 ===
Republican primary
Party	Candidate	Votes	%
Republican	Greg Martin (incumbent)	6,881	100.00%
Total votes		6,881	100.00%

Democratic primary
Party	Candidate	Votes	%
Democratic	Allison Gorman	3,090	86.36%
Democratic	Tim Roberts	488	13.64%
Total votes		3,578	100.00%

Tennessee House of Representatives District 26 general election, 2022
Party	Candidate	Votes	%
Republican	Greg Martin (incumbent)	15,039	63.87%
Democratic	Allison Gorman	8,506	36.13%
Total votes		23,545	100.00%
Republican hold			

=== District 27 ===
Republican primary
Party	Candidate	Votes	%
Republican	Patsy Hazlewood (incumbent)	6,722	100.00%
Total votes		6,722	100.00%

Tennessee House of Representatives District 27 general election, 2022
Party	Candidate	Votes	%
Republican	Patsy Hazlewood (incumbent)	15,431	70.75%
Independent	Michael Potter	6,380	29.25%
Total votes		21,811	100.00%
Republican hold			

=== District 28 ===
Democratic primary
Party	Candidate	Votes	%
Democratic	Yusuf Hakeem (incumbent)	4,982	100.00%
Total votes		4,982	100.00%

Tennessee House of Representatives District 28 general election, 2022
Party	Candidate	Votes	%
Democratic	Yusuf Hakeem (incumbent)	10,521	100.00%
Total votes		10,521	100.00%
Democratic hold			

=== District 29 ===
Republican primary
Party	Candidate	Votes	%
Republican	Greg Vital (incumbent)	6,040	100.00%
Total votes		6,040	100.00%

Tennessee House of Representatives District 29 general election, 2022
Party	Candidate	Votes	%
Republican	Greg Vital (incumbent)	15,659	100.00%
Total votes		15,659	100.00%
Republican hold			

=== District 30 ===
Republican primary
Party	Candidate	Votes	%
Republican	Esther Helton (incumbent)	4,647	100.00%
Total votes		4,647	100.00%

Tennessee House of Representatives District 30 general election, 2022
Party	Candidate	Votes	%
Republican	Esther Helton (incumbent)	13,616	100.00%
Total votes		13,616	100.00%
Republican hold			

=== District 31 ===
Republican primary
Party	Candidate	Votes	%
Republican	Ron Travis (incumbent)	7,799	100.00%
Total votes		7,799	100.00%

Democratic primary
Party	Candidate	Votes	%
Democratic	David L. Brown	950	100.00%
Total votes		950	100.00%

Tennessee House of Representatives District 31 general election, 2022
Party	Candidate	Votes	%
Republican	Ron Travis (incumbent)	14,646	86.33%
Democratic	David L. Brown	2,320	13.67%
Total votes		16,966	100.00%
Republican hold			

=== District 32 ===
Republican primary
Party	Candidate	Votes	%
Republican	Monty Fritts	3,071	33.76%
Republican	Teresa Pesterfield Kirkham	2,256	24.80%
Republican	Keaton Bowman	1,643	18.06%
Republican	Donnie Hall	1,325	14.56%
Republican	Randy Childs	709	8.82%
Total votes		9,098	100.00%

Democratic primary
Party	Candidate	Votes	%
Democratic	Jan Hahn	1,602	100.00%
Total votes		1,602	100.00%

Tennessee House of Representatives District 32 general election, 2022
Party	Candidate	Votes	%
Republican	Monty Fritts	15,735	76.73%
Democratic	Jan Hahn	4,772	23.27%
Total votes		20,507	100.00%
Republican hold			

=== District 33 ===
Republican primary
Party	Candidate	Votes	%
Republican	John Ragan (incumbent)	4,401	100.00%
Total votes		4,401	100.00%

Democratic primary
Party	Candidate	Votes	%
Democratic	Jim Dodson	1,915	81.77%
Democratic	James Brewer	427	18.23%
Total votes		2,342	100.00%

Tennessee House of Representatives District 33 general election, 2022
Party	Candidate	Votes	%
Republican	John Ragan (incumbent)	11,093	61.72%
Democratic	Jim Dodson	6,878	38.28%
Total votes		20,507	100.00%
Republican hold			

=== District 34 ===
Republican primary
Party	Candidate	Votes	%
Republican	Tim Rudd (incumbent)	3,240	100.00%
Total votes		3,240	100.00%

Democratic primary
Party	Candidate	Votes	%
Democratic	Laura Bohling	1,862	100.00%
Total votes		1,862	100.00%

Tennessee House of Representatives District 34 general election, 2022
Party	Candidate	Votes	%
Republican	Tim Rudd (incumbent)	9,142	61.08%
Democratic	Laura Bohling	5,827	38.92%
Total votes		14,969	100.00%
Republican hold			

=== District 35 ===
Republican primary
Party	Candidate	Votes	%
Republican	William Slater	3,351	52.67%
Republican	Deanne DeWitt	1,684	26.46%
Republican	Joe Kirkpatrick	1,328	20.87%
Total votes		6,363	100.00%

Tennessee House of Representatives District 35 general election, 2022
Party	Candidate	Votes	%
Republican	William Slater	13,158	100.00%
Total votes		13,158	100.00%
Republican hold			

=== District 36 ===
Republican primary
Party	Candidate	Votes	%
Republican	Dennis Powers (incumbent)	8,929	100.00%
Total votes		8,929	100.00%

Tennessee House of Representatives District 36 general election, 2022
Party	Candidate	Votes	%
Republican	Dennis Powers (incumbent)	11,892	100.00%
Total votes		11,892	100.00%
Republican hold			

=== District 37 ===
Republican primary
Party	Candidate	Votes	%
Republican	Charlie Baum (incumbent)	3,658	100.00%
Total votes		3,658	100.00%

Democratic primary
Party	Candidate	Votes	%
Democratic	Bill Levine	1,587	100.00%
Total votes		1,587	100.00%

Tennessee House of Representatives District 37 general election, 2022
Party	Candidate	Votes	%
Republican	Charlie Baum (incumbent)	9,456	65.44%
Democratic	Bill Levine	4,993	34.56%
Total votes		14,449	100.00%
Republican hold			

=== District 38 ===
Republican primary
Party	Candidate	Votes	%
Republican	Kelly Keisling (incumbent)	9,734	100.00%
Total votes		9,734	100.00%

Tennessee House of Representatives District 38 general election, 2022
Party	Candidate	Votes	%
Republican	Kelly Keisling (incumbent)	13,006	100.00%
Total votes		13,006	100.00%
Republican hold			

=== District 39 ===
Republican primary
Party	Candidate	Votes	%
Republican	Iris Rudder (incumbent)	6,924	100.00%
Total votes		6,924	100.00%

Democratic primary
Party	Candidate	Votes	%
Democratic	Bruce Manuel	2,148	100.00%
Total votes		2,148	100.00%

Tennessee House of Representatives District 39 general election, 2022
Party	Candidate	Votes	%
Republican	Iris Rudder (incumbent)	14,207	76.73%
Democratic	Bruce Manuel	4,309	23.27%
Total votes		18,516	100.00%
Republican hold			

=== District 40 ===
Republican primary
Party	Candidate	Votes	%
Republican	Michael Hale	6,698	59.58%
Republican	Terri Lynn Weaver (incumbent)	4,544	40.42%
Total votes		11,242	100.00%

Democratic primary
Party	Candidate	Votes	%
Democratic	Tom Cook	1,464	100.00%
Total votes		1,464	100.00%

Tennessee House of Representatives District 40 general election, 2022
Party	Candidate	Votes	%
Republican	Michael Hale	14,869	83.39%
Democratic	Tom Cook	2,961	16.61%
Total votes		17,830	100.00%
Republican hold			

=== District 41 ===
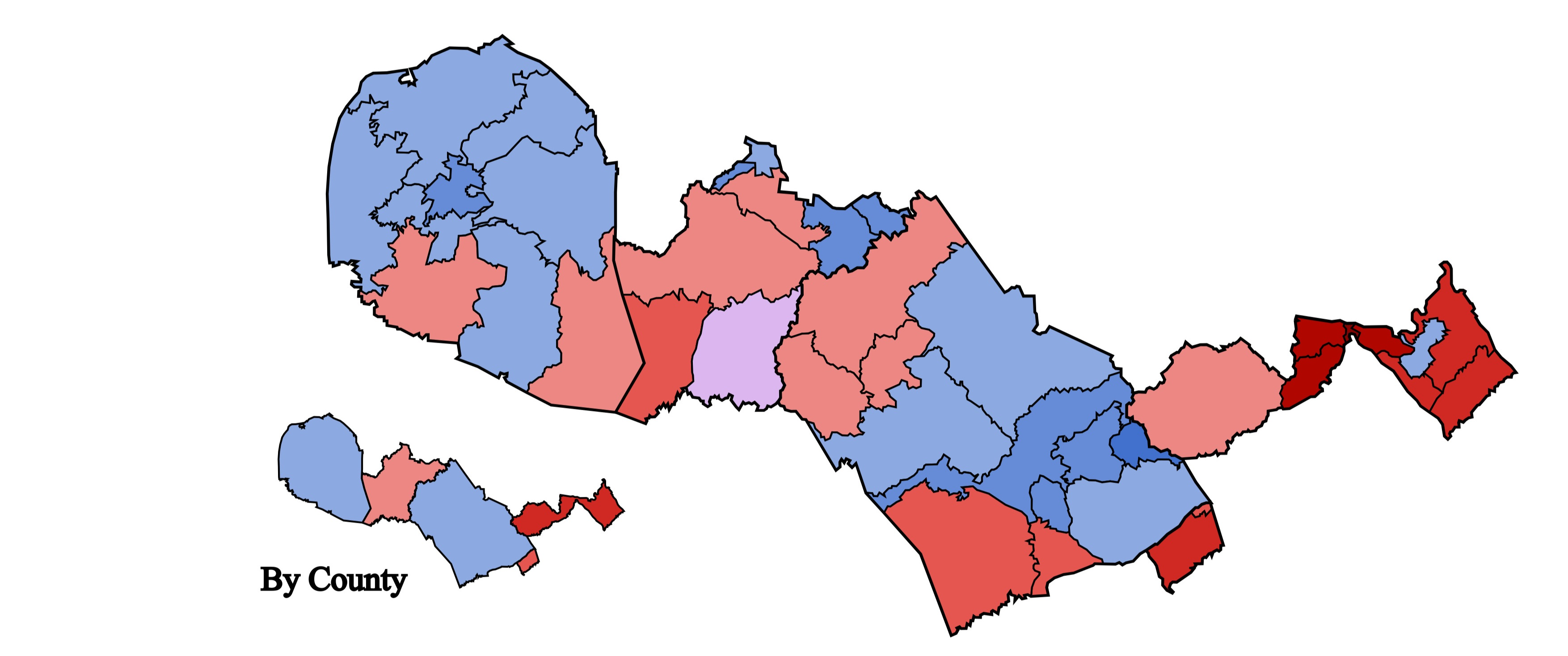
Results by precinct and county Butler: 80–90%; 70–80%; 60–70%; 50–60%; Windle: 70–80%; 60–70%; 50–60%; Tie: 50%

Republican primary
Party	Candidate	Votes	%
Republican	Ed Butler	4,119	53.44%
Republican	Michael Swisher	2,417	31.36%
Republican	Bradley Hayes	1,172	15.20%
Total votes		7,708	100.00%

Tennessee House of Representatives District 41 general election, 2022
Party	Candidate	Votes	%
Republican	Ed Butler	9,079	52.59%
Independent	John Windle (incumbent)	8,184	47.41%
Total votes		17,263	100.00%
Republican gain from Independent			

=== District 42 ===
Republican primary
Party	Candidate	Votes	%
Republican	Ryan Williams (incumbent)	4,926	100.00%
Total votes		4,926	100.00%

Tennessee House of Representatives District 42 general election, 2022
Party	Candidate	Votes	%
Republican	Ryan Williams (incumbent)	12,929	100.00%
Total votes		12,929	100.00%
Republican hold			

=== District 43 ===
Republican primary
Party	Candidate	Votes	%
Republican	Paul Sherrell (incumbent)	4,637	50.40%
Republican	Bobby Robinson	4,564	49.60%
Total votes		9,201	100.00%

Democratic primary
Party	Candidate	Votes	%
Democratic	Cheryl Womack Uselton	1,540	100.00%
Total votes		1,540	100.00%

Tennessee House of Representatives District 43 general election, 2022
Party	Candidate	Votes	%
Republican	Paul Sherrell (incumbent)	11,854	77.69%
Democratic	Cheryl Womack Uselton	3,404	22.31%
Total votes		15,258	100.00%
Republican hold			

=== District 44 ===
Republican primary
Party	Candidate	Votes	%
Republican	William Lamberth (incumbent)	4,363	100.00%
Total votes		4,363	100.00%

Democratic primary
Party	Candidate	Votes	%
Democratic	Kesa Fowler	1,008	100.00%
Total votes		1,008	100.00%

Tennessee House of Representatives District 44 general election, 2022
Party	Candidate	Votes	%
Republican	William Lamberth (incumbent)	13,884	78.13%
Democratic	Kesa Fowler	3,887	21.87%
Total votes		17,771	100.00%
Republican hold			

=== District 45 ===
Republican primary
Party	Candidate	Votes	%
Republican	Johnny C. Garrett (incumbent)	3,868	100.00%
Total votes		3,868	100.00%

Tennessee House of Representatives District 45 general election, 2022
Party	Candidate	Votes	%
Republican	Johnny C. Garrett (incumbent)	14,432	100.00%
Total votes		14,432	100.00%
Republican hold			

=== District 46 ===
Republican primary
Party	Candidate	Votes	%
Republican	Clark Boyd (incumbent)	5,935	100.00%
Total votes		5,935	100.00%

Tennessee House of Representatives District 46 general election, 2022
Party	Candidate	Votes	%
Republican	Clark Boyd (incumbent)	16,023	100.00%
Total votes		16,023	100.00%
Republican hold			

=== District 47 ===
Republican primary
Party	Candidate	Votes	%
Republican	Rush Bricken (incumbent)	7,117	100.00%
Total votes		7,117	100.00%

Tennessee House of Representatives District 47 general election, 2022
Party	Candidate	Votes	%
Republican	Rush Bricken (incumbent)	12,565	80.53%
Independent	Veronica Owens	3,038	19.47%
Total votes		15,603	100.00%
Republican hold			

=== District 48 ===
Republican primary
Party	Candidate	Votes	%
Republican	Bryan Terry (incumbent)	4,606	100.00%
Total votes		4,606	100.00%

Democratic primary
Party	Candidate	Votes	%
Democratic	Matt Ferry	1,910	100.00%
Total votes		1,910	100.00%

Tennessee House of Representatives District 48 general election, 2022
Party	Candidate	Votes	%
Republican	Bryan Terry (incumbent)	11,564	67.10%
Democratic	Matt Ferry	5,669	32.90%
Total votes		17,233	100.00%
Republican hold			

=== District 49 ===
Republican primary
Party	Candidate	Votes	%
Republican	Mike Sparks (incumbent)	2,080	100.00%
Total votes		2,080	100.00%

Democratic primary
Party	Candidate	Votes	%
Democratic	Morgan Woodberry	1,253	100.00%
Total votes		1,253	100.00%

Tennessee House of Representatives District 49 general election, 2022
Party	Candidate	Votes	%
Republican	Mike Sparks (incumbent)	7,744	59.50%
Democratic	Morgan Woodberry	5,272	40.50%
Total votes		13,016	100.00%
Republican hold			

=== District 50 ===
Democratic primary
Party	Candidate	Votes	%
Democratic	Bo Mitchell (incumbent)	3,650	100.00%
Total votes		3,650	100.00%

Tennessee House of Representatives District 50 general election, 2022
Party	Candidate	Votes	%
Democratic	Bo Mitchell (incumbent)	12,086	100.00%
Total votes		12,086	100.00%
Democratic hold			

=== District 51 ===
Democratic primary
Party	Candidate	Votes	%
Democratic	Bill Beck (incumbent)	5,770	100.00%
Total votes		5,770	100.00%

Tennessee House of Representatives District 51 general election, 2022
Party	Candidate	Votes	%
Democratic	Bill Beck (incumbent)	17,661	100.00%
Total votes		17,661	100.00%
Democratic hold			

=== District 52 ===
Democratic primary
Party	Candidate	Votes	%
Democratic	Justin Jones	1,956	53.24%
Democratic	Delishia Porterfield	1,718	46.76%
Total votes		3,674	100.00%

Tennessee House of Representatives District 52 general election, 2022
Party	Candidate	Votes	%
Democratic	Justin Jones	14,432	100.00%
Total votes		14,432	100.00%
Democratic hold			

=== District 53 ===
Democratic primary
Party	Candidate	Votes	%
Democratic	Jason L. Powell (incumbent)	3,368	100.00%
Total votes		3,368	100.00%

Republican primary
Party	Candidate	Votes	%
Republican	Dia Hart	1,062	99.25%
Republican	Yog Nepal (write-in)	8	0.75%
Total votes		1,070	100.00%

Tennessee House of Representatives District 53 general election, 2022
Party	Candidate	Votes	%
Democratic	Jason L. Powell (incumbent)	9,008	66.10%
Republican	Dia Hart	4,619	33.90%
Total votes		13,627	100.00%
Democratic hold			

=== District 54 ===
Democratic primary
Party	Candidate	Votes	%
Democratic	Vincent B. Dixie (incumbent)	5,920	100.00%
Total votes		5,920	100.00%

Tennessee House of Representatives District 54 general election, 2022
Party	Candidate	Votes	%
Democratic	Vincent B. Dixie (incumbent)	13,955	100.00%
Total votes		13,955	100.00%
Democratic hold			

=== District 55 ===
Democratic primary
Party	Candidate	Votes	%
Democratic	John Ray Clemmons (incumbent)	2,601	100.00%
Total votes		2,601	100.00%

Tennessee House of Representatives District 55 general election, 2022
Party	Candidate	Votes	%
Democratic	John Ray Clemmons (incumbent)	7,551	100.00%
Total votes		7,551	100.00%
Democratic hold			

=== District 56 ===
Democratic primary
Party	Candidate	Votes	%
Democratic	Bob Freeman (incumbent)	5,866	100.00%
Total votes		5,866	100.00%

Tennessee House of Representatives District 56 general election, 2022
Party	Candidate	Votes	%
Democratic	Bob Freeman (incumbent)	17,352	100.00%
Total votes		17,352	100.00%
Democratic hold			

=== District 57 ===
Republican primary
Party	Candidate	Votes	%
Republican	Susan M. Lynn (incumbent)	5,603	100.00%
Total votes		5,603	100.00%

Tennessee House of Representatives District 57 general election, 2022
Party	Candidate	Votes	%
Republican	Susan M. Lynn (incumbent)	15,907	100.00%
Total votes		15,907	100.00%
Republican hold			

=== District 58 ===
Democratic primary
Party	Candidate	Votes	%
Democratic	Harold M. Love Jr. (incumbent)	3,735	100.00%
Total votes		3,735	100.00%

Tennessee House of Representatives District 58 general election, 2022
Party	Candidate	Votes	%
Democratic	Harold M. Love Jr. (incumbent)	10,426	100.00%
Total votes		10,426	100.00%
Democratic hold			

=== District 59 ===
Democratic primary
Party	Candidate	Votes	%
Democratic	Caleb Hemmer	5,274	100.00%
Total votes		5,274	100.00%

Republican primary
Party	Candidate	Votes	%
Republican	Michelle Foreman	3,439	62.00%
Republican	Wyatt Rampy	2,108	38.00%
Total votes		5,547	100.00%

Tennessee House of Representatives District 59 general election, 2022
Party	Candidate	Votes	%
Democratic	Caleb Hemmer	15,509	52.40%
Republican	Michelle Foreman	14,088	47.60%
Total votes		29,597	100.00%
Democratic hold			

=== District 60 ===
Democratic primary
Party	Candidate	Votes	%
Democratic	Darren Jernigan (incumbent)	3,876	100.00%
Total votes		3,876	100.00%

Republican primary
Party	Candidate	Votes	%
Republican	Christopher Huff	2,026	100.00%
Total votes		2,026	100.00%

Tennessee House of Representatives District 60 general election, 2022
Party	Candidate	Votes	%
Democratic	Darren Jernigan (incumbent)	11,201	60.20%
Republican	Christopher Huff	7,405	39.80%
Total votes		18,606	100.00%
Democratic hold			

=== District 61 ===
Republican primary
Party	Candidate	Votes	%
Republican	Gino Bulso	5,162	61.45%
Republican	Bob Ravener	3,238	38.55%
Total votes		8,400	100.00%

Democratic primary
Party	Candidate	Votes	%
Democratic	Steven Cervantes	2,421	100.00%
Total votes		2,421	100.00%

Tennessee House of Representatives District 61 general election, 2022
Party	Candidate	Votes	%
Republican	Gino Bulso	16,733	65.94%
Democratic	Steven Cervantes	8,644	34.06%
Total votes		25,377	100.00%
Republican hold			

=== District 62 ===
Republican primary
Party	Candidate	Votes	%
Republican	Pat Marsh (incumbent)	6,210	100.00%
Total votes		6,210	100.00%

Tennessee House of Representatives District 62 general election, 2022
Party	Candidate	Votes	%
Republican	Pat Marsh (incumbent)	13,496	100.00%
Total votes		13,496	100.00%
Republican hold			

=== District 63 ===
Republican primary
Party	Candidate	Votes	%
Republican	Jake McCalmon	3,122	44.39%
Republican	Laurie Cardoza-Moore	2,944	41.86%
Republican	James Sloan	967	13.75%
Total votes		7,033	100.00%

Democratic primary
Party	Candidate	Votes	%
Democratic	Kisha Davis	2,215	100.00%
Total votes		2,215	100.00%

Tennessee House of Representatives District 63 general election, 2022
Party	Candidate	Votes	%
Republican	Jake McCalmon	16,696	69.37%
Democratic	Kisha Davis	7,373	30.63%
Total votes		24,069	100.00%
Republican hold			

=== District 64 ===
Republican primary
Party	Candidate	Votes	%
Republican	Scott Cepicky (incumbent)	4,750	54.58%
Republican	Jason Gilliam	3,953	45.42%
Total votes		8,703	100.00%

Democratic primary
Party	Candidate	Votes	%
Democratic	Jameson Manor	1,877	100.00%
Total votes		1,877	100.00%

Tennessee House of Representatives District 64 general election, 2022
Party	Candidate	Votes	%
Republican	Scott Cepicky (incumbent)	15,079	70.70%
Democratic	Jameson Manor	6,248	29.30%
Total votes		21,327	100.00%
Republican hold			

=== District 65 ===
Republican primary
Party	Candidate	Votes	%
Republican	Sam Whitson (incumbent)	6,794	100.00%
Total votes		6,794	100.00%

Tennessee House of Representatives District 65 general election, 2022
Party	Candidate	Votes	%
Republican	Sam Whitson (incumbent)	18,484	100.00%
Total votes		18,484	100.00%
Republican hold			

=== District 66 ===
Republican primary
Party	Candidate	Votes	%
Republican	Sabi "Doc" Kumar (incumbent)	5,864	100.00%
Total votes		5,864	100.00%

Tennessee House of Representatives District 66 general election, 2022
Party	Candidate	Votes	%
Republican	Sabi "Doc" Kumar (incumbent)	18,484	100.00%
Total votes		18,484	100.00%
Republican hold			

=== District 67 ===
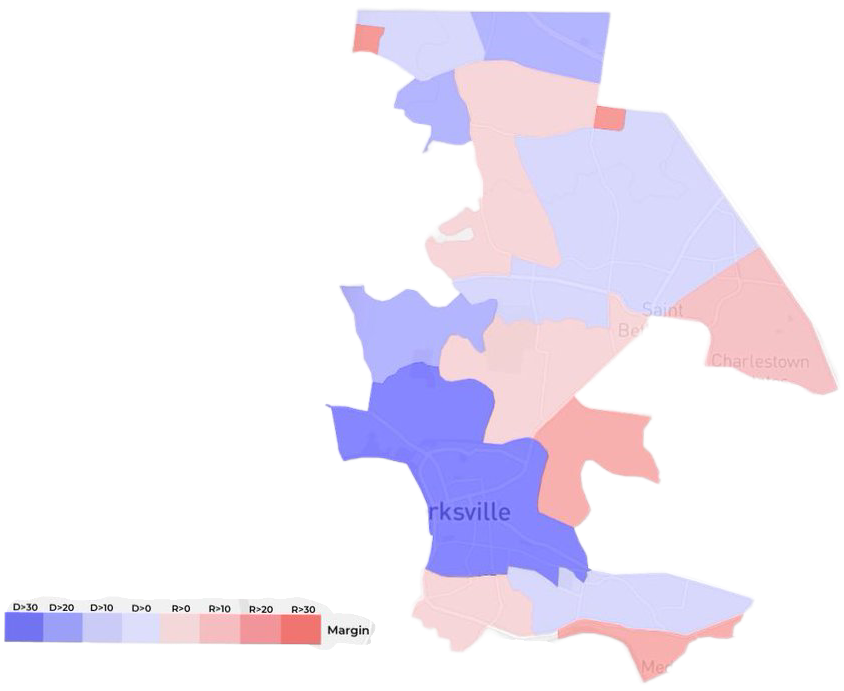
Results by precinct

Democratic primary
Party	Candidate	Votes	%
Democratic	Ronnie Glynn	1,758	100.00%
Total votes		1,758	100.00%

Republican primary
Party	Candidate	Votes	%
Republican	Tommy Vallejos, Sr.	1,433	63.32%
Republican	John Dawson	830	36.68%
Total votes		5,864	100.00%

Tennessee House of Representatives District 67 general election, 2022
Party	Candidate	Votes	%
Democratic	Ronnie Glynn	5,767	50.67%
Republican	Tommy Vallejos, Sr.	5,614	49.33%
Total votes		11,381	100.00%
Democratic hold			

=== District 68 ===
Republican primary
Party	Candidate	Votes	%
Republican	Curtis Johnson (incumbent)	5,368	100.00%
Total votes		5,368	100.00%

Tennessee House of Representatives District 68 general election, 2022
Party	Candidate	Votes	%
Republican	Curtis Johnson (incumbent)	13,501	71.17%
Independent	Monica Meeks	5,469	28.83%
Total votes		18,970	100.00%
Republican hold			

=== District 69 ===
Republican primary
Party	Candidate	Votes	%
Republican	Jody Barrett	3,291	39.70%
Republican	Brian Johnson	2,823	34.06%
Republican	Jeff Eby	1,663	20.06%
Republican	Angela Marie Redden	512	6.18%
Total votes		8,289	100.00%

Democratic primary
Party	Candidate	Votes	%
Democratic	Candie Loreeta Hedge	942	53.93%
Democratic	Val Sloan	773	45.07%
Total votes		1,715	100.00%

Tennessee House of Representatives District 69 general election, 2022
Party	Candidate	Votes	%
Republican	Jody Barrett	12,554	78.36%
Democratic	Candie Loreeta Hedge	3,204	20.00%
Independent	Leonard D. (Lenny) Ladner	262	1.64%
Total votes		16,020	100.00%
Republican hold			

=== District 70 ===
Republican primary
Party	Candidate	Votes	%
Republican	Clay Doggett (incumbent)	8,621	100.00%
Total votes		8,621	100.00%

Tennessee House of Representatives District 70 general election, 2022
Party	Candidate	Votes	%
Republican	Clay Doggett (incumbent)	14,147	100.00%
Total votes		14,147	100.00%
Republican hold			

=== District 71 ===
Republican primary
Party	Candidate	Votes	%
Republican	Kip Capley	3,589	33.61%
Republican	Jason Rich	3,441	32.22%
Republican	Mitchell Skelton	1,959	18.34%
Republican	Bill White	1,689	15.83%
Total votes		10,678	100.00%

Democratic primary
Party	Candidate	Votes	%
Democratic	David P. Carson II	1,201	100.00%
Total votes		1,201	100.00%

Tennessee House of Representatives District 71 general election, 2022
Party	Candidate	Votes	%
Republican	Kip Capley	14,585	81.71%
Democratic	David P. Carson II	3,264	18.29%
Total votes		17,849	100.00%
Republican hold			

=== District 72 ===
Republican primary
Party	Candidate	Votes	%
Republican	Kirk Haston (incumbent)	7,831	100.00%
Total votes		7,831	100.00%

Tennessee House of Representatives District 72 general election, 2022
Party	Candidate	Votes	%
Republican	Kirk Haston (incumbent)	14,780	100.00%
Total votes		14,780	100.00%
Republican hold			

=== District 73 ===
Republican primary
Party	Candidate	Votes	%
Republican	Chris Todd (incumbent)	6,467	100.00%
Total votes		6,467	100.00%

Democratic primary
Party	Candidate	Votes	%
Democratic	Erica Nicole Coleman	1,995	100.00%
Total votes		1,995	100.00%

Tennessee House of Representatives District 73 general election, 2022
Party	Candidate	Votes	%
Republican	Chris Todd (incumbent)	13,480	71.04%
Democratic	Erica Nicole Coleman	5,496	28.96%
Total votes		18,976	100.00%
Republican hold			

=== District 74 ===
Republican primary
Party	Candidate	Votes	%
Republican	Jay Reedy (incumbent)	8,139	100.00%
Total votes		8,139	100.00%

Tennessee House of Representatives District 74 general election, 2022
Party	Candidate	Votes	%
Republican	Jay Reedy (incumbent)	14,328	100.00%
Total votes		14,328	100.00%
Republican hold			

=== District 75 ===
Republican primary
Party	Candidate	Votes	%
Republican	Jeff Burkhart	981	40.57%
Republican	Deanna McLaughlin	910	37.63%
Republican	Kent Griffy	527	21.80%
Total votes		2,418	100.00%

Tennessee House of Representatives District 75 general election, 2022
Party	Candidate	Votes	%
Republican	Jeff Burkhart	6,851	100.00%
Total votes		6,851	100.00%
Republican hold			

=== District 76 ===
Republican primary
Party	Candidate	Votes	%
Republican	Tandy Darby (incumbent)	6,465	100.00%
Total votes		6,465	100.00%

Tennessee House of Representatives District 76 general election, 2022
Party	Candidate	Votes	%
Republican	Tandy Darby (incumbent)	13,271	82.87%
Independent	James Hart	1,829	11.42%
Independent	Kevin West	914	5.71%
Total votes		16,014	100.00%
Republican hold			

=== District 77 ===
Republican primary
Party	Candidate	Votes	%
Republican	Russell "Rusty" Grills (incumbent)	7,487	100.00%
Total votes		7,487	100.00%

Tennessee House of Representatives District 77 general election, 2022
Party	Candidate	Votes	%
Republican	Russell "Rusty" Grills (incumbent)	12,785	100.00%
Total votes		12,785	100.00%
Republican hold			

=== District 78 ===
Republican primary
Party	Candidate	Votes	%
Republican	Mary Littleton (incumbent)	5,238	100.00%
Total votes		5,238	100.00%

Democratic primary
Party	Candidate	Votes	%
Democratic	Krystle James	1,642	100.00%
Total votes		1,642	100.00%

Tennessee House of Representatives District 78 general election, 2022
Party	Candidate	Votes	%
Republican	Mary Littleton (incumbent)	13,084	73.63%
Democratic	Krystle James	4,686	26.37%
Total votes		17,770	100.00%
Republican hold			

=== District 79 ===
Republican primary
Party	Candidate	Votes	%
Republican	Brock Martin	4,083	56.26%
Republican	Gordon Wildridge	3,175	43.74%
Total votes		7,258	100.00%

Democratic primary
Party	Candidate	Votes	%
Democratic	Thomas Jefferson	902	100.00%
Total votes		902	100.00%

Tennessee House of Representatives District 79 general election, 2022
Party	Candidate	Votes	%
Republican	Brock Martin	12,622	81.19%
Democratic	Thomas Jefferson	2,924	18.81%
Total votes		15,546	100.00%
Republican hold			

=== District 80 ===
Democratic primary
Party	Candidate	Votes	%
Democratic	Johnny Shaw (incumbent)	4,428	100.00%
Total votes		4,428	100.00%

Tennessee House of Representatives District 80 general election, 2022
Party	Candidate	Votes	%
Democratic	Johnny Shaw (incumbent)	8,724	100.00%
Total votes		8,724	100.00%
Democratic hold			

=== District 81 ===
Republican primary
Party	Candidate	Votes	%
Republican	Debra Moody (incumbent)	5,128	100.00%
Total votes		5,128	100.00%

Tennessee House of Representatives District 81 general election, 2022
Party	Candidate	Votes	%
Republican	Debra Moody (incumbent)	11,930	79.63%
Independent	Nicholas Sawall	3,052	20.37%
Total votes		14,982	100.00%
Republican hold			

=== District 82 ===
Republican primary
Party	Candidate	Votes	%
Republican	Chris Hurt (incumbent)	5,512	100.00%
Total votes		5,512	100.00%

Tennessee House of Representatives District 82 general election, 2022
Party	Candidate	Votes	%
Republican	Chris Hurt (incumbent)	12,181	100.00%
Total votes		12,181	100.00%
Republican hold			

=== District 83 ===
Republican primary
Party	Candidate	Votes	%
Republican	Mark White (incumbent)	8,638	100.00%
Total votes		8,638	100.00%

Tennessee House of Representatives District 83 general election, 2022
Party	Candidate	Votes	%
Republican	Mark White (incumbent)	17,231	100.00%
Total votes		17,231	100.00%
Republican hold			

=== District 84 ===
Democratic primary
Party	Candidate	Votes	%
Democratic	Joe Towns Jr. (incumbent)	4,002	77.92%
Democratic	Brandon Price	1,134	22.08%
Total votes		5,136	100.00%

Tennessee House of Representatives District 84 general election, 2022
Party	Candidate	Votes	%
Democratic	Joe Towns Jr. (incumbent)	7,338	100.00%
Total votes		7,338	100.00%
Democratic hold			

=== District 85 ===
Democratic primary
Party	Candidate	Votes	%
Democratic	Jesse Chism (incumbent)	8,274	81.20%
Democratic	Phyllis Parks	1,916	18.80%
Total votes		10,190	100.00%

Tennessee House of Representatives District 85 general election, 2022
Party	Candidate	Votes	%
Democratic	Jesse Chism (incumbent)	13,988	100.00%
Total votes		13,988	100.00%
Democratic hold			

=== District 86 ===
Democratic primary
Party	Candidate	Votes	%
Democratic	Barbara Cooper (incumbent)	5,233	78.96%
Democratic	Will Richardson	1,395	21.04%
Total votes		6,628	100.00%

Tennessee House of Representatives District 86 general election, 2022
Party	Candidate	Votes	%
Democratic	Barbara Cooper †	8,006	73.11%
Independent	Michael Porter	2,944	26.89%
Total votes		10,950	100.00%
Democratic hold			

=== District 87 ===
Democratic primary
Party	Candidate	Votes	%
Democratic	Karen Camper (incumbent)	5,562	100.00%
Total votes		5,562	100.00%

Tennessee House of Representatives District 87 general election, 2022
Party	Candidate	Votes	%
Democratic	Karen Camper (incumbent)	7,881	100.00%
Total votes		7,881	100.00%
Democratic hold			

=== District 88 ===
Democratic primary
Party	Candidate	Votes	%
Democratic	Larry Miller (incumbent)	5,608	100.00%
Total votes		5,608	100.00%

Tennessee House of Representatives District 88 general election, 2022
Party	Candidate	Votes	%
Democratic	Larry Miller (incumbent)	9,178	100.00%
Total votes		9,178	100.00%
Democratic hold			

=== District 89 ===
Republican primary
Party	Candidate	Votes	%
Republican	Justin Lafferty (incumbent)	4,356	100.00%
Total votes		4,356	100.00%

Democratic primary
Party	Candidate	Votes	%
Democratic	M.D. Dotson	2,267	100.00%
Total votes		2,267	100.00%

Tennessee House of Representatives District 89 general election, 2022
Party	Candidate	Votes	%
Republican	Justin Lafferty (incumbent)	12,865	66.21%
Democratic	M.D. Dotson	6,566	33.79%
Total votes		19,431	100.00%
Republican hold			

=== District 90 ===
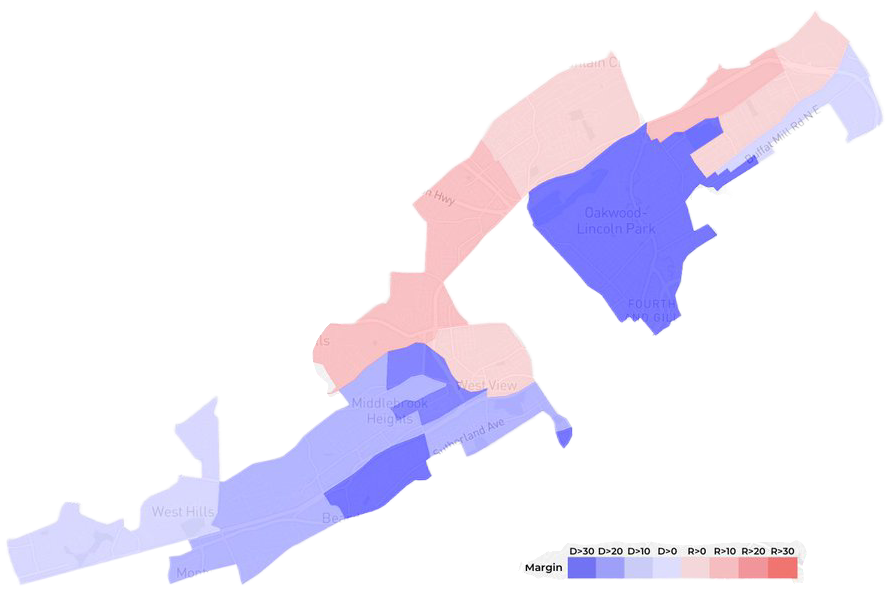
Results by precinct

Democratic primary
Party	Candidate	Votes	%
Democratic	Gloria Johnson (incumbent)	3,690	100.00%
Total votes		3,690	100.00%

Republican primary
Party	Candidate	Votes	%
Republican	David "Pozy" Poczobut	2,001	100.00%
Total votes		2,001	100.00%

Tennessee House of Representatives District 90 general election, 2022
Party	Candidate	Votes	%
Democratic	Gloria Johnson (incumbent)	8,473	57.90%
Republican	David "Pozy" Poczobut	6,162	42.10%
Total votes		14,635	100.00%
Democratic hold			

=== District 91 ===
Democratic primary
Party	Candidate	Votes	%
Democratic	Torrey Harris (incumbent)	4,639	58.52%
Democratic	Barbara Farmer-Tolbert	3,288	41.48%
Total votes		7,927	100.00%

Tennessee House of Representatives District 91 general election, 2022
Party	Candidate	Votes	%
Democratic	Torrey Harris (incumbent)	10,630	100.00%
Total votes		10,630	100.00%
Democratic hold			

=== District 92 ===
Republican primary
Party	Candidate	Votes	%
Republican	Todd Warner (incumbent)	4,049	54.40%
Republican	Matt Fitterer	2,059	27.66%
Republican	Jeff Ford	1,335	17.94%
Total votes		7,443	100.00%

Democratic primary
Party	Candidate	Votes	%
Democratic	Angela Hughes	1,648	100.00%
Total votes		1,648	100.00%

Tennessee House of Representatives District 92 general election, 2022
Party	Candidate	Votes	%
Republican	Todd Warner (incumbent)	13,527	73.92%
Democratic	Angela Hughes	4,772	26.08%
Total votes		18,299	100.00%
Republican hold			

=== District 93 ===
Democratic primary
Party	Candidate	Votes	%
Democratic	G. A. Hardaway (incumbent)	5,150	100.00%
Total votes		5,150	100.00%

Tennessee House of Representatives District 93 general election, 2022
Party	Candidate	Votes	%
Democratic	G. A. Hardaway (incumbent)	7,359	100.00%
Total votes		7,359	100.00%
Democratic hold			

=== District 94 ===
Republican primary
Party	Candidate	Votes	%
Republican	Ron M. Gant (incumbent)	6,753	100.00%
Total votes		6,753	100.00%

Tennessee House of Representatives District 94 general election, 2022
Party	Candidate	Votes	%
Republican	Ron M. Gant (incumbent)	17,528	100.00%
Total votes		17,528	100.00%
Republican hold			

=== District 95 ===
Republican primary
Party	Candidate	Votes	%
Republican	Kevin Vaughan (incumbent)	8,481	100.00%
Total votes		8,481	100.00%

Democratic primary
Party	Candidate	Votes	%
Democratic	Patricia Causey	2,834	100.00%
Total votes		2,834	100.00%

Tennessee House of Representatives District 95 general election, 2022
Party	Candidate	Votes	%
Republican	Kevin Vaughan (incumbent)	17,939	74.65%
Democratic	Patricia Causey	6,093	25.35%
Total votes		24,032	100.00%
Republican hold			

=== District 96 ===
Democratic primary
Party	Candidate	Votes	%
Democratic	Dwayne Thompson (incumbent)	6,674	100.00%
Total votes		6,674	100.00%

Tennessee House of Representatives District 96 general election, 2022
Party	Candidate	Votes	%
Democratic	Dwayne Thompson (incumbent)	10,273	100.00%
Total votes		10,273	100.00%
Democratic hold			

=== District 97 ===
Results by precinct Gillespie: 60–70%; 50–60%; Harris: 60–70%; 50–60%; No data

Republican primary
Party	Candidate	Votes	%
Republican	John Gillespie (incumbent)	7,897	100.00%
Total votes		7,897	100.00%

Democratic primary
Party	Candidate	Votes	%
Democratic	Toniko Harris	2,855	50.18%
Democratic	Houston Wolf	2,835	49.82%
Total votes		5,690	100.00%

Tennessee House of Representatives District 97 general election, 2022
Party	Candidate	Votes	%
Republican	John Gillespie (incumbent)	12,083	56.72%
Democratic	Toniko Harris	9,219	43.28%
Total votes		21,302	100.00%
Republican hold			

=== District 98 ===
Democratic primary
Party	Candidate	Votes	%
Democratic	Antonio Parkinson (incumbent)	5,431	100.00%
Total votes		5,431	100.00%

Tennessee House of Representatives District 98 general election, 2022
Party	Candidate	Votes	%
Democratic	Antonio Parkinson (incumbent)	8,432	100.00%
Total votes		8,432	100.00%
Democratic hold			

=== District 99 ===
Republican primary
Party	Candidate	Votes	%
Republican	Tom Leatherwood (incumbent)	6,526	71.78%
Republican	Lee Mills	2,565	28.22%
Total votes		9,091	100.00%

Tennessee House of Representatives District 99 general election, 2022
Party	Candidate	Votes	%
Republican	Tom Leatherwood (incumbent)	17,374	100.00%
Total votes		17,374	100.00%
Republican hold			

== See also ==
- 2022 Tennessee elections
- 2022 Tennessee Senate election
