= Tennessee House of Representatives 24th district =

State legislative district in Tennessee

Tennessee's 24th State House of Representatives district
- Map of Tennessee House districts with the 24th District shaded in red
Representative
Kevin Raper; R–Cleveland
since 2023
- Demographics: 75.8% White; 5.6% Black; 11.3% Hispanic; 1.6% Asian; 4.6% Multiracial
- Population (2024): 72,538

The Tennessee House of Representatives 24th district is one of the 99 legislative districts in the lower house of the Tennessee General Assembly. The district is located in East Tennessee and covers most of Bradley County. The district includes most of Cleveland, as well as surrounding unincorporated areas in the same metropolitan area. Kevin Raper has represented the district since 2023.

== Demographics ==
The Tennessee Comptroller estimates the population as of 2024 at 72,538.

- 75.8% of the district is White
- 11.3% of the district is Hispanic
- 5.6% of the district is Black
- 1.6% of the district is Asian
- 4.6% of the district is Two or more races

Detailed demographic information is also available through Census Reporter.

== History ==
The 88th Tennessee General Assembly was the first in which all districts were numbered. Since its creation, the 24th district has been part or all of Bradley County.

== List of Representatives ==
Representative	Party	Years of Service	General Assembly	Hometown
Kevin Raper	Republican	2023-present	113th-114th	Cleveland
Mark Hall	Republican	2011-2024	111th-112th	Cleveland
Kevin Brooks	Republican	2003-2010	105th-110th	Cleveland
Dewayne Bunch	Republican	1997-2002	101st-104th	Cleveland
Don Bird	Republican	1987-1996	99th-100th	Cleveland
Harold Stockburger	Republican	1979-1986	98th	Cleveland
Steve Bivens	Democratic	1971-1978	91st-97th	Cleveland
Ben Longley	Republican	1971-1978	85th-90th	Cleveland
