= Tennessee House of Representatives 20th district =

State legislative district in Tennessee

Tennessee's 20th State House of Representatives district
- Map of Tennessee House districts with the 20th District shaded in red
Representative
Tom Stinnett; R–Friendsville
since 2025
- Demographics: 86.3% White; 3.4% Black; 5.6% Hispanic; 0.9% Asian; 3.1% Multiracial
- Population (2024): 71,567

The Tennessee House of Representatives 20th district is one of the 99 legislative districts in the lower house of the Tennessee General Assembly. The district is located in East Tennessee and covers the west of Blount County. The main cities in the area are Maryville, Louisville, and Friendsville, as well as Eagleton Village. Tom Stinnett has represented the district since 2025.

== Demographics ==
The Tennessee Comptroller estimates the population as of 2024 at 71,567.

- 86.3% of the district is White
- 5.6% of the district is Hispanic
- 3.4% of the district is African American
- 0.9% of the district is Asian
- 3.1% of the district is Two or more races

Detailed demographic information is also available through Census Reporter.

== History ==
The 88th Tennessee General Assembly was the first in which all districts were numbered. At this time, the 20th district was in Blount County. From the 99th to the 102nd GAs, it was made up of parts of Blount and Loudon counties. From the 103rd GA, it has been only part of Blount County.

== List of Representatives ==
Representative	Party	Years of Service	General Assembly	Hometown
Tom Stinnett	Republican	2025-present	114th	Friendsville
Bryan Richey	Republican	2023-2024	113th	Maryville
Bob Ramsey	Republican	2009-2022	106th-112th	Maryville
Doug Overbey	Republican	2001-2008	102nd-105th	Maryville
Howard T. Kerr	Republican	1995-2000	99th-101st	Maryville
W. Townsend Anderson	Republican	1989-1994	96th-98th	Maryville
Art Swann	Republican	1985-1988	94th-95th	Maryville
W. Townsend Anderson	Republican	1983-1984	93rd	Maryville
Clifford Henry Jr.	Republican	1975-1982	89th-92nd	Maryville
Fred A. Huffstetler	Republican	1967-1974	85th-88th	Maryville
