= Tennessee House of Representatives 59th district =

State legislative district in Tennessee

Tennessee's 59th State House of Representatives district
- Map of Tennessee House districts with the 59th District shaded in red
Representative
Caleb Hemmer; D–Nashville
since 2023
- Demographics: 84% White; 6% Black; 4% Hispanic; 3% Asian; 3% Multiracial
- Population (2024): 74,639

Tennessee House of Representatives District 59 is one of the 99 legislative districts in the lower house of the Tennessee General Assembly. The district is located in Middle Tennessee and covers parts of southern Davidson County, including neighborhoods such as Belle Meade, Forest Hills, Oak Hill, and Bellevue, in Nashville. Incumbent Democrat Caleb Hemmer has represented the district since 2023. The district is considered highly competitive in elections. In the 2024 presidential election, Kamala Harris won the district with a margin of 2.5%.

== Demographics ==
The Tennessee Comptroller estimates the population as of 2024 at 74,639. The district's median household income and other socioeconomic indicators are significantly higher than state averages, reflecting its mix of affluent suburbs and established neighborhoods around southern Nashville.

- 83.6% of the district is White
- 5.6% of the district is African American
- 4.2% of the district is Hispanic
- 2.9% of the district is Asian
- 0.2% of the district is some other race
- 3.4% of the district is Two or more races

Detailed demographic information is also available through Census Reporter.

== List of Representatives ==
Representative	Party	Years of Service	General Assembly	Hometown
Mark Proctor	Democratic	2026 – present		
Caleb Hemmer	Democratic	2023 – 2026	113th-114th	Nashville
Jason Potts	Democratic	2019 – 2022	111th-112th	Nashville
Sherry Jones	Democratic	1995 – 2018	99th-110th	Nashville
Richard R. Clark	Democratic	1973 – 1994	88th-97th	Nashville

== Elections ==
=== 2024 ===
2024 Tennessee House of Representatives District 59 general election
Party	Candidate	Votes	%
Democratic	Caleb Hemmer	25,812	100.0%
Total votes		25,812	100.0%
Democratic hold			

=== 2022 ===
2022 Tennessee House of Representatives District 59 general election
Party	Candidate	Votes	%
Democratic	Caleb Hemmer	15,509	52.4%
Republican	Michelle Foreman	14,088	47.6%
Total votes		29,597	100.0%
Democratic hold			

=== 2020 ===
2020 Tennessee House of Representatives District 59 general election
Party	Candidate	Votes	%
Democratic	Caleb Hemmer	15,418	100.0%
Total votes		15,418	100.0%
Democratic hold			

=== 2018 ===
2018 Tennessee House of Representatives District 59 general election
Party	Candidate	Votes	%
Democratic	Jason Potts	11,122	78.61%
Republican	David Birdsong	3,027	21.39%
Total votes		14,149	100.00%
Democratic hold			

=== 2016 ===
2016 Tennessee House of Representatives District 59 general election
Party	Candidate	Votes	%
Democratic	Sherry Jones	12,874	100.0%
Total votes		12,874	100.0%
Democratic hold			

=== 2014 ===
2014 Tennessee House of Representatives District 59 general election
Party	Candidate	Votes	%
Democratic	Sherry Jones	6,670	100.0%
Total votes		6,670	100.0%
Democratic hold			

=== 2012 ===
2012 Tennessee House of Representatives District 59 general election
Party	Candidate	Votes	%
Democratic	Sherry Jones	11,358	70.12%
Republican	Robert Duvall	4,839	29.88%
Total votes		16,197	100.00%
Democratic hold			

=== 2010 ===
2010 Tennessee House of Representatives District 59 general election
Party	Candidate	Votes	%
Democratic	Sherry Jones	6,023	62.67%
Republican	Duane Dominy	3,586	37.31%
Write in	Chris Polsen	1	0.02%
Total votes		9,610	100.00%
Democratic hold			

=== 2008 ===
2008 Tennessee House of Representatives District 59 general election
Party	Candidate	Votes	%
Democratic	Sherry Jones	14,528	100.0%
Total votes		14,528	100.0%
Democratic hold			

=== 2006 ===
2006 Tennessee House of Representatives District 59 general election
Party	Candidate	Votes	%
Democratic	Sherry Jones	7,960	71.06%
Republican	Mike B. Meadows	3,242	28.94%
Total votes		9,610	100.00%
Democratic hold			

=== 2004 ===
2004 Tennessee House of Representatives District 59 general election
Party	Candidate	Votes	%
Democratic	Sherry Jones	14,683	100.0%
Total votes		14,683	100.0%
Democratic hold			

=== 2002 ===
2002 Tennessee House of Representatives District 59 general election
Party	Candidate	Votes	%
Democratic	Sherry Jones	7,165	65.28%
Republican	B. J. Brown	3,810	34.72%
Total votes		9,610	100.00%
Democratic hold			

=== 2000 ===
2000 Tennessee House of Representatives District 59 general election
Party	Candidate	Votes	%
Democratic	Sherry Jones	13,402	99.97%
Write in		4	0.03%
Total votes		13,408	100.0%
Democratic hold			

=== 1998 ===
1998 Tennessee House of Representatives District 59 general election
Party	Candidate	Votes	%
Democratic	Sherry Jones	5,556	100.0%
Total votes		5,556	100.0%
Democratic hold			

== See also ==
- Tennessee House of Representatives
- Davidson County, Tennessee
