= Tennessee House of Representatives 43rd district =

State legislative district in Tennessee

Tennessee's 43rd State House of Representatives district
- Map of Tennessee House districts with the 43rd District shaded in red
Representative
Paul Sherrell; R–Sparta
since 2017
- Demographics: 86.7% White; 2% Black; 7.3% Hispanic; 0.5% Asian; 3.2% Multiracial
- Population (2024): 70,695

The Tennessee House of Representatives 43rd district is one of the 99 legislative districts in the lower house of the Tennessee General Assembly. The district is located in Middle Tennessee and covers all of Warren and White counties. The main settlements in the area are Sparta, and McMinnville, others include Centertown, Morrison, and Doyle. The district is largely rural and the rest is unincorporated. Paul Sherrell has represented the district since 2017.

== Demographics ==
The Tennessee Comptroller estimates the population as of 2024 at 70,695.

- 86.7% of the district is White
- 7.3% of the district is Hispanic
- 2% of the district is African American
- 0.5% of the district is Asian
- 3.2% of the district is Two or more races

Detailed demographic information is also available through Census Reporter.

== History ==
The 88th Tennessee General Assembly was the first in which all districts were numbered. At this time, the 43rd district was made up of Warren and White counties. During the 93rd GA, it was made up of Cannon, Putnam, Warren, and White counties. From the 94th-102nd GAs, it was made up of all of White and parts of Cumberland and Warren counties. From the 103rd-107th GAs, it was made up of all of White and parts of Putnam and Warren counties. From the 108th-112th GAs, it was made up of all of White, Grundy and parts of Warren counties. It has been only Warren and White counties since the 113th General Assembly.

== List of Representatives ==
Representative	Party	Years of Service	General Assembly	Hometown
Paul Sherrell	Republican	2017-present	110th-114th	Sparta
Kevin Dunlap	Democratic	2015-2016	109th	Rock Island
Paul Bailey	Republican	2013-2014	108th	Sparta
Charles Curtiss	Democratic	1995-2012	99th-107th	Sparta
Ivory Hillis	Democratic	1973-1994	88th-98th	Sparta
