= Tennessee House of Representatives 41st district =

State legislative district in Tennessee

Tennessee's 41st State House of Representatives district
- Map of Tennessee House districts with the 41st District shaded in red
Representative
Ed Butler; R–Rickman
since 2023
- Demographics: 92.7% White; 1.8% Black; 2.2% Hispanic; 0.2% Asian; 2.9% Multiracial
- Population (2024): 69,142

The Tennessee House of Representatives 41st district is one of the 99 legislative districts in the lower house of the Tennessee General Assembly. The district is located in East Tennessee and covers all of Overton and Morgan, and parts of Anderson, Fentress and Roane counties. The district includes Livingston, Sunbright, Norris, and Wartburg, as well as part of Jamestown. The rest of the district is unincorporated and mostly rural. Ed Butler has represented the district since 2023.

== Demographics ==
The Tennessee Comptroller estimates the population as of 2024 at 69,142.

- 92.7% of the district is White
- 2.2% of the district is Hispanic
- 1.9% of the district is Black
- 0.2% of the district is Asian
- 2.9% of the district is Two or more races

Detailed demographic information is also available through Census Reporter.

== History ==
The 88th Tennessee General Assembly was the first in which all districts were numbered. At this time, the 41st district was in Fentress, Morgan, and Overton counties, where it remained until the 107th GA. From the 108th-112th GAs, it was composed of Morgan, Jackson, Overton and part of Fentress counties. Since the 113th General Assembly, it has been composed of all of Overton and Morgan, and parts of Anderson, Fentress and Roane counties.

== List of Representatives ==
Representative	Party	Years of Service	General Assembly	Hometown
Ed Butler	Republican	2023-present	113th-114th	Rickman
John Windle	Independent	2021-2022	112th	Livingston
John Windle	Democratic	1991-2020	97th-111th	Livingston
Tommy Burnett	Democratic	1973-1990	88th-96th	Jamestown
