= Mike Carter (politician) =

American politician (1953–2021)

Member of the Tennessee House of Representatives from the 29th district
- In office January 8, 2013 – May 15, 2021
- Preceded by: JoAnne Favors
- Succeeded by: Greg Vital

Personal details
- Born: Owen Michael Carter; October 16, 1953
- Died: May 15, 2021 (aged 67) Ooltewah, Tennessee, U.S.
- Party: Republican
- Education: Middle Tennessee State University (BS); University of Memphis (JD)
- Profession: Attorney

Owen Michael Carter (October 16, 1953 – May 15, 2021) was an American politician and a Republican member of the Tennessee House of Representatives representing District 29 from January 8, 2013 to May 15, 2021. He served as the Chair of the House Civil Justice Committee.

== Education ==
Carter earned his BS from Middle Tennessee State University and his JD from University of Memphis.

== Political career ==
In 1997, he was appointed Judge of the General Sessions Court of Hamilton County, Tennessee.

In 2012, when Democratic Representative JoAnne Favors retired and left the seat open, Carter ran unopposed for both the August 2, 2012, Republican primary, winning with 5,577 votes, and the November 6, 2012, general election, winning with 19,860 votes.

In June 2020, Carter and fellow Representative David Byrd voted in support of Tennessee House Resolution 340 stating that "mainstream media has sensationalized the reporting on COVID-19 in the service of political agendas." In August 2020, Carter was placed in the intensive care unit for a critical case of COVID-19.

== Health and death ==
In November 2020, Carter was diagnosed with pancreatic cancer while being treated for COVID-19. Carter died from pancreatic cancer at his home on May 15, 2021, at the age of 67.

In June, 2021, his wife, Joan Carter, was appointed to his seat in the Tennessee House of Representatives. On September 14, 2021, Republican Greg Vital was elected in a special election to succeed Carter.
