= Judd Matheny =

American politician (1970–2024)

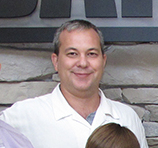
- Matheny in 2013

Member of the Tennessee House of Representatives from the 47th district
- In office 2002–2018
- Preceded by: Doyle Lewis Jr
- Succeeded by: Rush Bricken

Personal details
- Born: April 9, 1970 Knoxville, Tennessee, U.S.
- Died: April 2, 2024 (aged 53) Tullahoma, Tennessee, U.S.
- Party: Republican
- Spouse: Christy Matheny (m. 1999; div. 2019)
- Children: 2
- Education: Excelsior University, 2000
- Occupation: Security, private Investigation

Judd Ellis Matheny (April 9, 1970 – April 2, 2024) was an American Republican politician in Tennessee, who served as County Mayor for Coffee County, Tennessee, from 2022 until his death in 2024. Previously he represented the 47th district as state representative. His district included all or parts of Coffee, Warren counties. He served in the state house from 2002 to 2018. He succeeded Doyle Lewis Jr.

== Biography ==
Judd Matheny was born on April 9, 1970, in Knoxville.

Matheny enlisted with the Tennessee Army National Guard at Winchester, Tennessee, and graduated from Tullahoma High School in Tullahoma, in 1988. Matheny remained with the Tennessee Army National Guard until 1995.

Matheny was employed as a reserve deputy sheriff by the Putnam County Sheriff’s Department in 1990 and 1991, and then began worked as a full-time police officer with the city of Baxter, Tennessee, from 1991 through 1993. He became a special agent for the Tennessee Alcoholic Beverage Commission, where he worked within many liquor and narcotic related duties from 1994 to 1998.

In 1998, Matheny founded Advanced Protective Services, Inc., which specialized in private investigations, executive protection, electronic surveillance and counter-surveillance, training, and security consulting to a number of prominent corporations doing business in the Nashville area. He employed approximately thirty full-time, armed guards and about "250 police officers in an off-duty, uniformed capacity." Matheny retired from APS, Inc. and sold this business in August 2002.

Matheny completed his Bachelor of Science correspondence degree in Criminal Justice and Political Science from Excelsior University (based in Albany, New York) in 2000.

Matheny was chairman of the Coffee County Republican Party and was also a member of the Chambers of Commerce of Tullahoma, Manchester, and McMinnville. He was also a member of the National Rifle Association, the National Wild Turkey Federation, and Quail Unlimited. He was a Master Mason, and a member of the Tullahoma Rotary Club.

Matheny was a Methodist. He had two children, Abigail and Aulden.

Matheny endorsed Rick Perry in the Republican primary for the 2012 presidential election. He endorsed Ted Cruz in the Republican primary for the 2016 presidential election. In 2017, Matheny announced that he would run for Tennessee's 6th congressional district in 2018.

=== Death ===
On April 2, 2024, Matheny was found dead inside a vehicle in the driveway of his Coffee County home. He was 53. The Tennessee Bureau of Investigation said it was investigating the cause of death. However, the district attorney announced in a press conference that there was no evidence of foul play nor suicide. On May 15, 2024, County Medical Examiner Jay M. Trussler reported that a mixture of cocaine, alcohol, and Kratom contributed to his death.

Tennessee House of Representatives
Preceded by Doyle Lewis Jr	Member of the Tennessee House of Representatives from the 47th district 2002–2018	Succeeded by Rush Bricken
