= Mark Proctor (politician) =

American politician

Member-elect of the Tennessee House of Representatives from the 59th district
- Assuming office January 12, 2027
- Succeeding: Caleb Hemmer

Personal details
- Party: Democratic
- Website: Campaign website

Mark Proctor is an American politician. A member of the Democratic Party, he is the member-elect for the Tennessee House of Representatives for the 59th district. He was elected at the 2026 election. He defeated Angie Lawless in the Democratic primary. Proctor is gay.
