= Paul Sherrell =

American politician (born 1959)

Member of the Tennessee House of Representatives from the 43rd district
- Incumbent
- Assumed office January 10, 2017
- Preceded by: Kevin Dunlap

Personal details
- Born: March 28, 1959 (age 67)
- Party: Republican
- Spouse: Miranda
- Children: 2
- Website: Campaign website

Paul Sherrell (born March 28, 1959) is an American politician. A Republican, he represents the 43rd district in the Tennessee House of Representatives.

== Political career ==
In 2016, Sherrell ran for election to represent the 43rd district in the Tennessee House of Representatives. He won a three-way Republican primary with 45.16% of the vote, and went on to win the general election against Democratic incumbent Kevin Dunlap in the general election. He was re-elected in 2018 and ran again in 2020.

In November 2018, Tennessee House Republicans elected Sherrell to serve as Majority Floor Leader. As of June 2020, Sherrell sat on the following committees:

- Judiciary Committee
- Constitutional Protections & Sentencing Subcommittee
- Health Committee
- Mental Health & Substance Abuse Subcommittee
- Naming, Designating, & Private Acts Committee

During deliberation on a bill proposed by Dennis Powers to allow the use of firing squads as an execution method in March 2023, Sherrell suggested adding "an amendment on that that would include hanging by a tree also", which was denounced by Black lawmakers and other commentators as a racist reference to lynching. Sherrell apologized for the remarks two days later. Members of the Tennessee Black Caucus criticized his apology for being "insincere" and campaigned for Sexton to reprimand Sherrell, with suggestions of removal from his committees and resignation.

In 2023, Sherrell supported resolutions to expel three Democratic lawmakers, including Pearson, from the legislature for violating decorum rules.

=== Electoral record ===
2016 Republican primary: Tennessee House of Representatives, District 43
Party	Candidate	Votes	%
Republican	Paul Sherrell	1,875	45.16%
Republican	Bob Robinson	1,812	43.64%
Republican	Sam Elder	465	11.20%

2016 general election: Tennessee House of Representatives, District 43
Party	Candidate	Votes	%
Republican	Paul Sherrell	11,692	53.38%
Democratic	Kevin Dunlap	10,213	46.62%

2018 Republican primary: Tennessee House of Representatives, District 43
Party	Candidate	Votes	%
Republican	Paul Sherrell	6,041	64.6%
Republican	Jerry Lowery	3,311	35.4%

2018 general election: Tennessee House of Representatives, District 43
Party	Candidate	Votes	%
Republican	Paul Sherrell	13,009	71.6%
Democratic	Les Trotman	5,159	28.4%
