= Tom Stinnett =

American politician (born 1955)

Member of the Tennessee House of Representatives from the 20th district
- Incumbent
- Assumed office January 14, 2025
- Preceded by: Bryan Richey

Personal details
- Born: July 30, 1955 (age 71)
- Party: Republican
- Spouse: Patricia Stinnett
- Children: 2
- Education: East Tennessee State University (BS); University of Tennessee (MPS); Lincoln Memorial University (EdS)
- Website: House website

Tom Stinnett (born July 30, 1955) is an American politician serving as a member of the Tennessee House of Representatives from the 20th district, which covers part of Blount County. A Republican, he was elected in November 2024 and took office in January 2025, succeeding Bryan Richey.

Before entering politics, Stinnett spent nearly 40 years as a career and technical education teacher and coached several sports teams.
