= Caleb Hemmer =

American politician (born 1981)

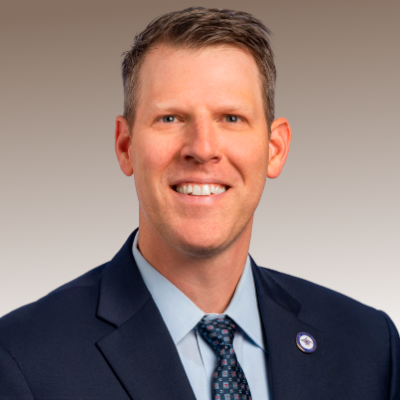

Member of the Tennessee House of Representatives from the 59th district
- In office January 10, 2023 – November 3, 2026
- Preceded by: Jason Potts
- Succeeded by: Mark Proctor

Personal details
- Born: July 22, 1981 (age 45)
- Party: Democratic
- Spouse: Lori
- Children: 2
- Education: University of Tennessee (BS); Tennessee Technological University (MBA)

Caleb Hemmer (born July 22, 1981) is an American politician from Tennessee. He is a Democrat and has represented the 59th district in the Tennessee House of Representatives from 2023 to 2026. He did not run for re-election in 2026.

== Education ==
Hemmer attended the University of Tennessee, where he earned a Bachelor of Science degree, before attending Tennessee Tech, where he earned a Master of Business Administration degree.

== Political career ==
In 2022, Hemmer was elected to represent the 59th district in the Tennessee House of Representatives. He chairs the Davidson County Delegation and serves on the Health, Insurance, Commerce, Private Acts and Government Operations committees.

He previously served as an aide to Phil Bredesen and an executive in the Tennessee Department of Economic and Community Development. Additionally, he served as a commissioner on the Metro Board of Fair Commissioners.

== Personal ==
Caleb Hemmer is from Nashville Tennessee and currently resides there with his family.
