= Sherry Jones =

American politician

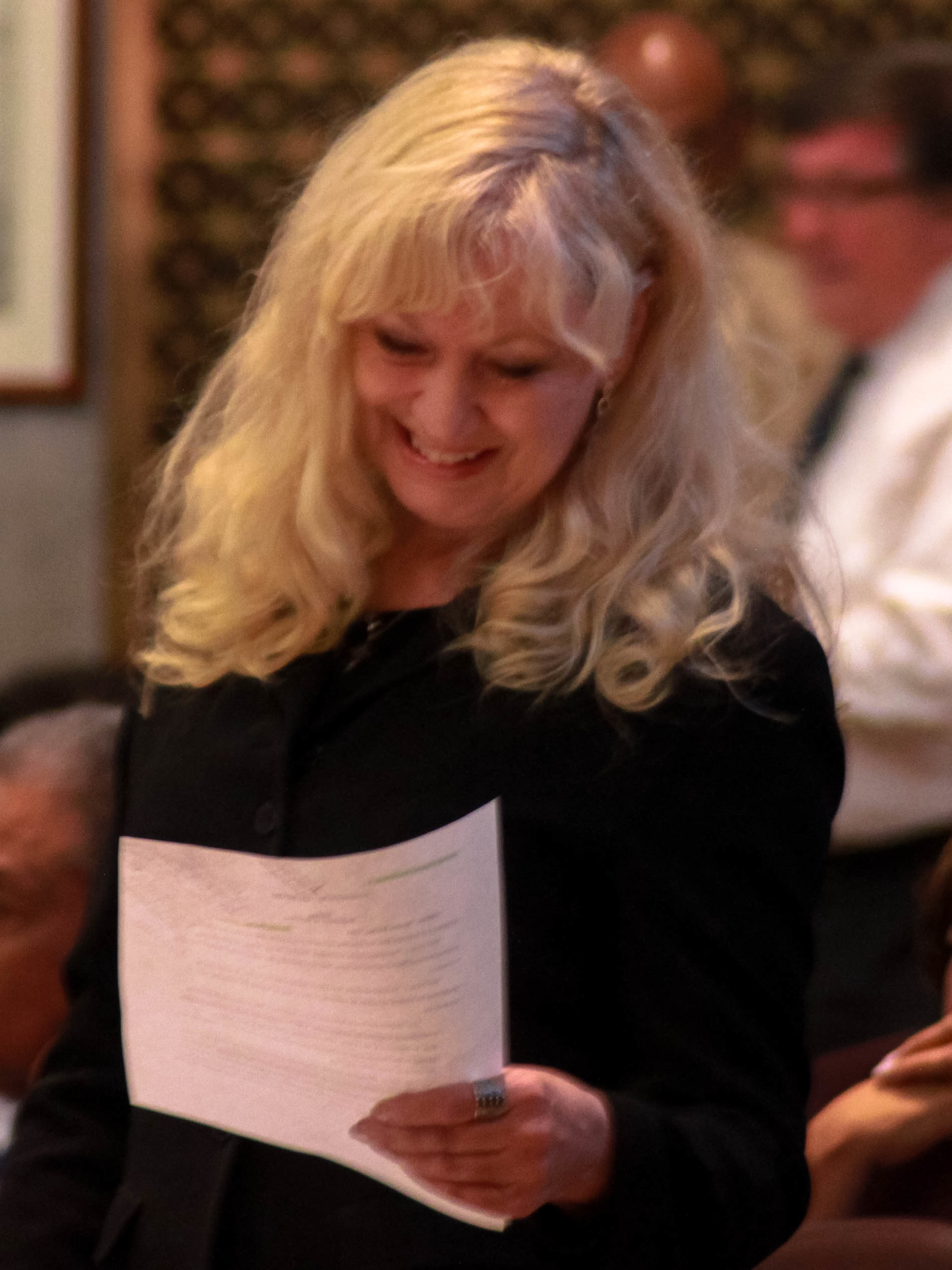

Member of the Tennessee House of Representatives from the 59th district
- In office January 1995 – January 2019
- Preceded by: Richard R. Clark
- Succeeded by: Jason Potts

Personal details
- Born: Nashville, Tennessee
- Party: Democratic
- Website: representativesherryjones.com

Sherry Jones (born in Nashville, Tennessee) is an American politician and a Democratic member of the Tennessee House of Representatives representing District 59 since January 1995.

== Electoral history ==
- 1994 Jones was initially elected in the 1994 Democratic Primary and November 8, 1994 General election.
- 1996 Jones was unopposed for the 1996 Democratic Primary and won the November 5, 1996 General election against Republican nominee Joe Allison.
- 1998 Jones was unopposed for both the August 6, 1998 Democratic Primary, winning with 1,529 votes, and the November 3, 1998 General election, winning with 4,627 votes.
- 2000 Jones was unopposed for both the August 3, 2000 Democratic Primary, winning with 779 votes, and the November 7, 2000 General election, winning with 13,402 votes.
- 2002 Jones was unopposed for the August 1, 2002 Democratic Primary, winning with 3,527 votes, and won the November 5, 2002 General election with 7,165 votes (65.3%) against Republican nominee B. J. Brown.
- 2004 Jones was challenged in the three-way August 5, 2004 Democratic Primary, winning with 873 votes (73.1%), and was unopposed for the November 2, 2004 General election, winning with 14,683 votes.
- 2006 Jones was challenged in the August 3, 2006 Democratic Primary, winning with 1,477 votes (54.7%), and won the November 7, 2006 General election with 7,960 votes (71.1%) against Republican nominee Mike Meadows.
- 2008 Jones was unopposed for both the August 7, 2008 Democratic Primary, winning with 643 votes, and the November 4, 2008 General election, winning with 14,528 votes.
- 2010 Jones was unopposed for the August 5, 2010 Democratic Primary, and won the November 2, 2010 General election, winning with 6,023 votes (62.7%) against Republican nominee Duane Dominy and a write-in candidate.
- 2012 Jones was unopposed for the August 2, 2012 Democratic Primary, winning with 1,271 votes, and won the November 6, 2012 General election with 11,358 votes (70.1%) against Republican nominee Robert Duvall.
