= Rush Bricken =

American politician (born 1951)

Member of the Tennessee House of Representatives from the 47th district
- Incumbent
- Assumed office January 8, 2019
- Preceded by: Judd Matheny

Personal details
- Born: B. Rush Bricken; August 4, 1951 (age 75)
- Party: Republican
- Education: Auburn University (BS); Vanderbilt University (MBA)
- Occupation: Politician; banker
- Website: Official website Campaign website

B. Rush Bricken (born August 4, 1951) is an American banker and politician. Since 2019, he has represented the 47th district of the Tennessee House of Representatives, based in Tullahoma and McMinnville, as a Republican.

== Early life and education ==
B. Rush Bricken was born on August 4, 1951. He has a BS from Auburn University in 1973 and an MBA from Vanderbilt University.

== Career ==
Bricken worked as a banker and accountant in the 1990s and 2000s. He later served as the CEO and CFO of Coffee County Bank in Manchester. He also served as a member of the Coffee County Commission for 22 years before his election to the House.

== Tennessee House of Representatives (2019–present) ==
In 2017, Bricken announced he would run to represent the 47th district of the Tennessee House of Representatives, left open after incumbent Judd Matheny announced his campaign for Tennessee's 6th congressional district. Bricken narrowly won the Republican primary election over Ronnie Holden and easily won the general election over Democrat Mike Winton. He was sworn in on January 8, 2019.

In 2023, Democratic representatives Gloria Johnson, Justin Jones and Justin Pearson violated House decorum rules during a protest following a school shooting in Nashville. Bricken supported successful resolutions to expel Jones and Pearson and opposed the unsuccessful attempt to expel Johnson. The expulsions were widely characterized as unprecedented, with some reporters noting that Bricken and a handful of other Republican representatives chose to expel Jones and Pearson, two young Black men, but not Johnson, an older white woman.

== Personal life ==
Bricken lives in Tullahoma with his wife, Belinda, with whom he has have four children.
