= Ben Longley =

American politician (1930–1990)

Member of the Tennessee House of Representatives from the Bradley County district
- In office 1967–1978

Member of the Tennessee Senate from the Bradley County district
- In office 1979–1987

Personal details
- Born: August 7, 1930 La Grange, Georgia, U.S.
- Died: September 1990 (aged 60)
- Party: Republican
- Occupation: insurance broker

Benjamin Lehman Longley (August 7, 1930 – September 1990) was an American politician in the state of Tennessee. Longley served in the Tennessee House of Representatives from 1967 to 1978 and in the Tennessee Senate from 1979 to 1987. A Republican, he represented Bradley County, Tennessee and worked as an insurance broker. He lives in Cleveland, Tennessee. Longley died of lung cancer in September 1990, at the age of 60.
