= Ed Butler (politician) =

American politician (born 1976)

Member of the Tennessee House of Representatives from the 41st district
- Incumbent
- Assumed office January 10, 2023
- Preceded by: John Windle

Personal details
- Born: September 29, 1976 (age 50)
- Party: Republican
- Children: 8
- Website: House website Campaign website

Ed Butler (born September 29, 1976) is an American politician. He serves as a Republican member for the 41st district of the Tennessee House of Representatives.
