= Jason Potts (politician) =

American politician (born 1978)

Member of the Tennessee House of Representatives from the 59th district
- In office January 8, 2019 – January 10, 2023
- Preceded by: Sherry Jones
- Succeeded by: Caleb Hemmer

Personal details
- Born: June 30, 1978 (age 48) Nashville, Tennessee, U.S.
- Party: Democratic
- Children: 2
- Education: University of Tennessee at Martin

Jason Potts (born June 30, 1978) is an American politician who was the Democratic representative for the 59th district in the Tennessee House of Representatives from 2019 to 2023.

== Background ==
Born in Nashville, Tennessee, Potts graduated from Spring Hill High School in 1996. He then attended the University of Tennessee at Martin. Potts later studied real estate at the Continual Learning Institute in Middle Tennessee and became a licensed general contractor. He is married and has two children.

== Elections ==
In 2018, Potts ran for the Democratic primary elections for District 59. He defeated Kyle Southern with 72 percent of the vote. On November 6, 2018, Potts defeated David Birdsong with 79 percent of the vote. In May 2021, Potts announced that he would not run for another term in the State House.

== Civic and membership ==
- Metropolitan Council of Nashville and Davidson County, District 30, 2011 – present
- Habitat for Humanity Nashville, present
- East Tusculum Neighborhood Group
- Fairlane Park Neighborhood Association
- Haywood Neighbors
- Tennessee Farm Bureau
- Chair, Metro Nashville Traffic and Parking Commission, 2015-2017
- Chair, Metro Nashville Public Works, 2012-2014.

== Committees ==
Members of the Judiciary are Michael G.Curcio as Chair, a Republican from Dickson who represent Hickman and part of Maury and Dickson Counties of District 69. Johnny Garrett as Vice-Chair, a Republican from Goodlettsville who represents part of Sumner County of District 45.

Mary Littleton is the House Subcommittee for Children and Families, a Republican from Dickson who represents Cheatham and parts of Dickson counties.

House Standing Committee of Transportation members is Dan Howell as Chair, a Republican from Georgetown who represents Meigs, Polk, and part of Bradley Counties. Bruce Griffey is the Vice-Chair from Paris, who portrays Henry, Benton, and Stewart counties.

Terri Lynn Weaver is the Chair of House Subcommittee for Safety and Funding. Weaver is a Republican from Lancaster from District 40 who handles counties Smith, Trousdale, and parts DeKalb and Sumner.

== Scorecard ==
For education, Potts' score was hundred percent. Rating accountability and innovation were zero percent. Economic Opportunity the score was sixty- seven. As an overall score for 2019 is a fifty percent. The average score for the House is eighty- eight percent.

== Bills ==
Jason Potts sponsored eighteen bills in the 111th General Assembly.

=== Employees and employers ===
Bill number HB0010 states, " As introduced, enacts the Prospective Employees Credit Information Privacy Act, which prohibits an employers from failing or refusing to recruit or interview a prospective employee with respect to certain employment based on that person's credit information and creates a private cause of action for those injured due to violation by employers." On February 6, 2019, the last action was withdrawn.

=== Fire prevention and investigation ===
Bill number HB0053 states," As introduced, requires the use of smoke alarms with a sealed battery unit enabling the alarms to operate continuously for ten years in all new constructions of one-family and two-family dwelling; recommends their use in all other new construction." The bill took effect on July 1, 2019.

=== Education ===
Bill number HB1396 states," As introduced, allows a child care program to submit its annual report to the commissioner of education in electronic format." The last action was P2C, caption bill held on desk pending amdt on February 11, 2019.

=== Traffic safety ===
Bill number HB1220 states, " As enacted, establishes requirements for the operation of electric foot scooters; specifies that for purposes of the DUI laws, an electric scooter will be considered a motor-driven vehicle. The bill provides that electric foot scooters and electric bicycles may be parked on a sidewalk in a manner not impeding the normal or reasonable movement of pedestrian or other traffic.
