= Kevin Dunlap =

American politician (born 1978)

Member of the Tennessee House of Representatives from the 43rd district
- In office January 13, 2015 – January 10, 2017
- Preceded by: Paul Bailey
- Succeeded by: Paul Sherrell

Personal details
- Born: May 3, 1978 (age 48) Rock Island, Tennessee, U.S.
- Party: Democratic
- Education: University of Tennessee (BA)
- Profession: Teacher
- Website: votedunlap.com

Kevin Dunlap (born May 3, 1978 in Rock Island, Tennessee) is an American politician. A Democratic Party member, he served in the Tennessee House of Representatives representing District 43 from January 13, 2015 to January 10, 2017. He lost his bid for reelection to Paul Sherrell.

== Education ==
Dunlap graduated from Warren County High School in 1996, third in a class of 400. Dunlap earned his BA in political science with honors from the University of Tennessee in 2000, and his Master's in Secondary Education in 2002 from the same university.

== Politics ==
According to the American Conservative Union he is one of the most conservative Democratic politicians in any state legislature. He voted for a bill on transgender students and restrooms. He co-sponsored a Bill designating the Bible as the state book. He is and advocate for workers issues.

== Elections ==
- 2014 Dunlap won the August 7, 2014 Democratic Primary, with 3,579 votes, and the November 4, 2014 General election, with 6,561 votes. Dunlap had a winning margin of 54 votes over his opponent, Republican Robert Dunham, who took 6,507 votes.
