= Kevin Raper =

American politician (born 1964)

Member of the Tennessee House of Representatives from the 24th district
- Incumbent
- Assumed office January 10, 2023
- Preceded by: Mark Hall

Member of the Bradley County Commission from the 7th district
- In office September 2018 – September 2022
- Preceded by: Mark Hall
- Succeeded by: Josh Rogers

Personal details
- Born: January 17, 1964 (age 62) United States
- Party: Republican
- Children: 2
- Website: Official website

Kevin Raper (born January 17, 1964) is an American politician. A Republican, he represents the 24th district, encompassing Cleveland and parts of unincorporated Bradley County, in the Tennessee House of Representatives.

== Biography ==
Kevin Raper is a 1982 graduate of McMinn Central High School. He received a Bachelor of Science degree in mathematics education from the University of Tennessee in 1987, a Master of Education degree from Tusculum University in 1996, and an education specialist degree from Tennessee Tech in 1997. He is a retired educator.

Raper first ran for District 7 Seat A on the Bradley County Commission in 2018, which was being vacated by Mark Hall, who successfully ran for State House District 24. He won the May 1 primary against Republican Josh Rogers with 1,110 votes, or 62.5% of the votes. He went on to win the general election on August 7, defeating Democrat Tammy Davis with 1,699 votes, or 72.2%. In 2019, Raper voted for a controversial property tax increase, as well as to override Bradley County Mayor Gary Davis's veto of the increase. He was also one of the strongest backers of a county-funded study on the feasibility of expanding sewers into unincorporated parts of Bradley County, which critics charged was unnecessary and being undertaken to financially benefit the local homebuilding industry.

Raper announced his intent to run for the 24th district seat in the Tennessee House of Representatives on November 10, 2021, after incumbent Mark Hall announced his intent to run for the Tennessee Senate. He won the August 4, 2022, primary with 2,107 votes, or 38.7% of the vote against three primary opponents. He faced no Democratic opponent in the general election on November 8. In 2023, Raper supported a resolution to expel three Democratic lawmakers from the legislature for violating decorum rules.

== Personal life ==
Raper is married and has two sons. He is a Baptist, and a member of the Sons of the American Revolution. On February 23, 2025, Raper received a liver transplant at Vanderbilt University Medical Center. He returned to the state legislature on March 27, 2025.

== Political views ==
Raper has stated that he believes that abortion should always be illegal except for when necessary to save the lives of pregnant women. He also described critical race theory as "divisive and racially motivated". In 2025, Raper acknowledged that he faced extensive pressure from special interest groups to vote in favor of Governor Bill Lee's universal school voucher program, but ultimately voted against it, stating that most of his constituents expressed opposition to it.
