= Greg Vital =

American politician (born 1956)

Member of the Tennessee House of Representatives from the 29th district
- Incumbent
- Assumed office September 14, 2021
- Preceded by: Mike Carter; Joan Carter (appointee)

Personal details
- Born: January 27, 1956 (age 70)
- Party: Republican
- Education: Southern Adventist University

Greg Vital (born January 27, 1956) is an American businessman and Republican politician who represents the 29th district in the Tennessee House of Representatives. He was first elected to that seat in a special election on September 14, 2021, replacing the late Mike Carter. The district includes much of eastern Hamilton County, including the Ooltewah and Georgetown communities.

== Biography ==
Greg Vital has lived in the Ooltewah-Georgetown area since approximately the early 1970s. He received a business degree from Southern Adventist University. Vital began work as an executive with a healthcare provider before cofounding Morning Pointe Senior Living in the mid-1990s. The company owns and operates senior living and Alzheimer's care facilities in five states.

Vital previous served on the Collegedale city commission. He narrowly lost a primary challenge to state senator Todd Gardenhire in 2012.

== Election and tenure ==
After the death of Mike Carter in May 2021, Vital announced his candidacy for the seat on June 14, 2021. On September 14, 2021, Vital received 3,884 votes, defeating Democratic challenger DeAngelo Jelks, who received 964 votes.

In 2023, Vital supported a resolution to expel three Democratic lawmakers from the legislature for violating decorum rules. The expulsion was widely characterized as unprecedented.
