= Dennis Powers =

American politician (born 1953)

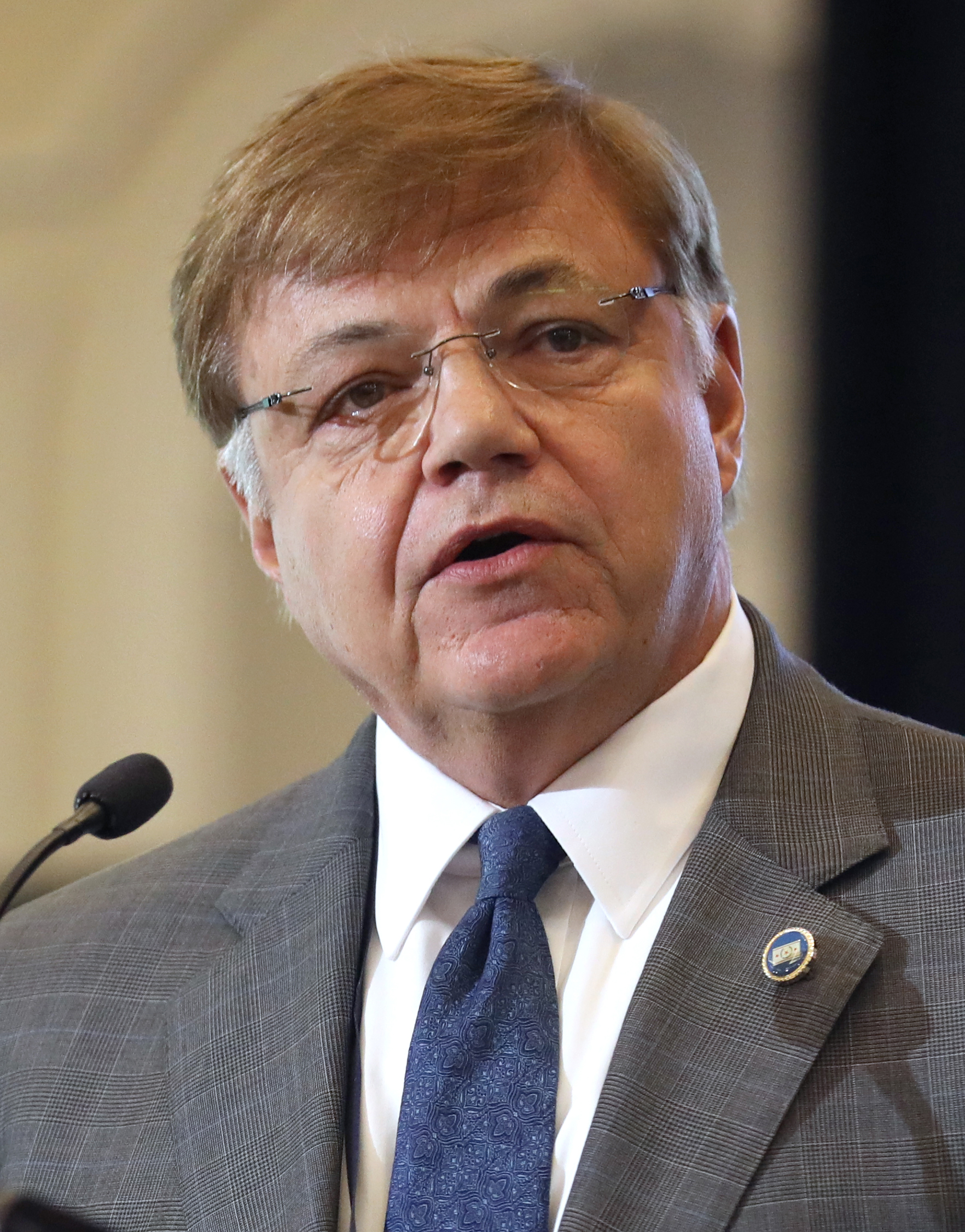
- Powers in 2023

Member of the Tennessee House of Representatives from the 36th district
- Incumbent
- Assumed office January 11, 2011
- Preceded by: Chad Faulkner

Personal details
- Born: September 14, 1953 (age 73) LaFollette, Tennessee, U.S.
- Party: Republican
- Spouse: Tracy Adkins (m. 1987)
- Education: University of Tennessee (BS)
- Website: House website Campaign Website

Dennis Powers (born September 14, 1953) is an American politician. Since 2011, he has served as a Republican member of the Tennessee House of Representatives from the 36th district, which encompasses Campbell County, Union County, and parts of Claiborne County.

== Early life and education ==
He was born on September 14, 1953, in LaFollette, Tennessee. He graduated from LaFollette High School and received a BS in business administration from the University of Tennessee in Knoxville.

== Career and community involvement ==
He started his career at the Baird Supply Company as a salesman, followed by the Furtex Corporation as a machinist, and later at the LaFollette Hardware and Lumber Co., a construction company. He then worked as an electronic data processing technician for Union Carbide (a subsidiary of Dow Chemical) in Oak Ridge, Tennessee, with a Security Q clearance. He also worked in the Energy Department Manager of the East Tennessee Human Resource Agency (ETHRA) for Campbell, Union, and surrounding counties. He now works as an insurance agent.

He is a former president of the Campbell County Young Republicans.

He is a member of the Tennessee Tea Party, the Heritage Foundation, the American Legislative Exchange Council, the National Right to Life, the National Rifle Association, the National Federation of Independent Business, the Tennessee Farm Bureau Federation, and the National Conference of State Legislators.

He is a member of Friends of Cove Lake State Park, a committee chair of the Boy Scouts of America, and a member of the Campbell County Board of Habitat for Humanity. He volunteers at LaFollette Medical Center. Other philanthropic endeavors include the Wounded Warrior Project, the American Cancer Society , and Relay for Life.

== Tennessee House of Representatives (2011–present) ==
=== Elections ===
In 1992, 1994, and 1996, Powers was the Republican nominee for Tennessee's 36th House of Representatives district. He won his first election to the seat in 2010, and he is in his eighth term as a state representative.

=== Tenure ===
Powers said in February 2023, in a debate regarding HB 327, which would make the Tennessee Office of Faith-Based Initiatives funded by the state, that he believes some decisions made by the Supreme Court have been incorrect.

In March 2023, Powers introduced a bill to expand the methods of execution in Tennessee to include firing squads, claiming that it would be beneficial for the families of victims to have closure and that firing squads were the preferred method by death row inmates. Democrats criticized the bill as supporting "cruel and unusual punishment" that increased the pain of execution and as a "step backward".

In April 2023, Powers supported a resolution to expel three Democratic lawmakers from the legislature for violating decorum rules. Some Democrats characterized the expulsion as unnecessary and unprecedented.

== Personal life ==
Powers married Tracy (née Adkins) Powers in 1987. They have been members of the First Baptist Church of Jacksboro since 1990.
