= Mark Hall (politician) =

American politician (born 1965)

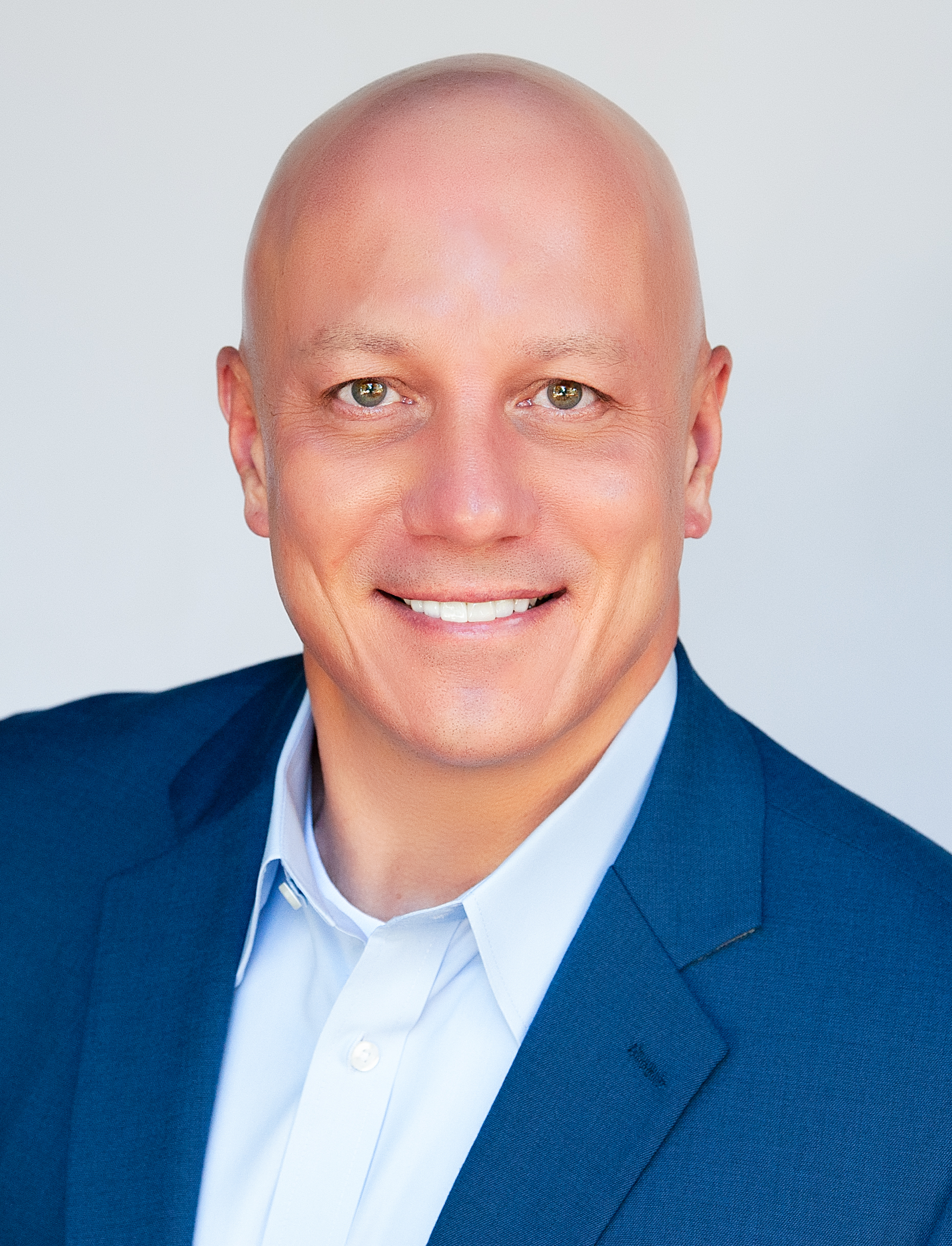

Member of the Tennessee House of Representatives from the 24th district
- In office January 8, 2019 – January 10, 2023
- Preceded by: Kevin Brooks
- Succeeded by: Kevin Raper

Member of the Bradley County Commission from the 7th district
- In office September 2006 – September 2018
- Succeeded by: Kevin Raper

Personal details
- Born: January 22, 1965 (age 61) United States
- Party: Republican
- Education: United States Marine Corps.
- Profession: Businessman
- Website: www.capitol.tn.gov/house/members/h24.html

Mark Hall (born January 22, 1965) is an American politician from Cleveland, Tennessee. From 2006 to 2018, he served as a seventh district commissioner on the Bradley County commission. He is served as the representative for the Tennessee House of Representatives district 24 from 2019 to 2023.

== Background ==
Mark Hall served in the United States Marine Corps. He is a small business owner, operating a barber shop in Cleveland, which he founded with $700 to his name.

== Legislative history and tenure ==
Mark Hall was first elected to the Bradley County Commission District 7 seat in 2006. This district includes much of the city of Cleveland. He was reelected in 2010 and 2014. During his tenure as a county commissioner, Hall advocated for the construction of a veterans home in Cleveland, serving as the co-chairman of the Southeast Tennessee Veterans Home Council.

In January 2018, Hall announced his intention to run for the 24th district state house seat being vacated by Kevin Brooks, who was running for mayor of Cleveland.

Hall won the Republican primary for the state representative district in August 2018 against challengers Gary Moore, Alan Ledford, and Israel Farless with 54% of the vote in a surprising margin. On November 6, 2018, Hall was elected with 75% of the vote, defeating Democrat Mallory Pickert. He was succeeded on the commission by Kevin Raper.

In response to the September 22nd, 2021, attack on Bradley County Sheriff's Office K-9 Joker, Hall proposed an amendment to increase the penalty for harming or killing law enforcement or emergency service animals. The legislation, known as "Joker's Law", makes unlawfully harming law enforcement service animals a Class B felony, and allows juveniles as young as 14 to be charged as adults. National attention came to this matter and other states have been encouraged to review their laws on this matter.

In 2022, Hall drafted "Ethan, Hailey, and Bentley's Law", commonly referred to as "Bentley's Law", which requires drunk drivers to pay child support for the children of their victims. The law is named after the children of a Chattanooga police officer killed in the line of duty and a Missouri child whose parents died in a crash in 2021, both of which were caused by intoxicated drivers. This law resulted in several other states considering similar legislation.

On November 8, 2021, Hall announced his intention to run for the 9th district of the Tennessee Senate, after incumbent Mike Bell announced he would not seek reelection. This seat became the 1st district after the 2020 United States redistricting cycle. He lost the August 4, 2022, primary to J. Adam Lowe. He was once again succeeded by Kevin Raper.

== Controversies ==
In November 2014 Hall was accused of abusing his then wife, after police responded to a call at his home. His residency was also questioned for being within his respective county district. He has also received criticism for incorrect assertions about his district.

== Political positions ==
Hall describes himself as a "conservative Republican." Hall supports low taxes, believing them to be bad for business. He opposes abortion, and supports veterans rights. He is a supporter of border security and opposes in-state college tuition for illegal immigrants and sanctuary cities. Hall supports work requirements for food stamp recipients, and opposes expanding Medicaid in Tennessee.
