= John Windle =

American politician (born 1962)

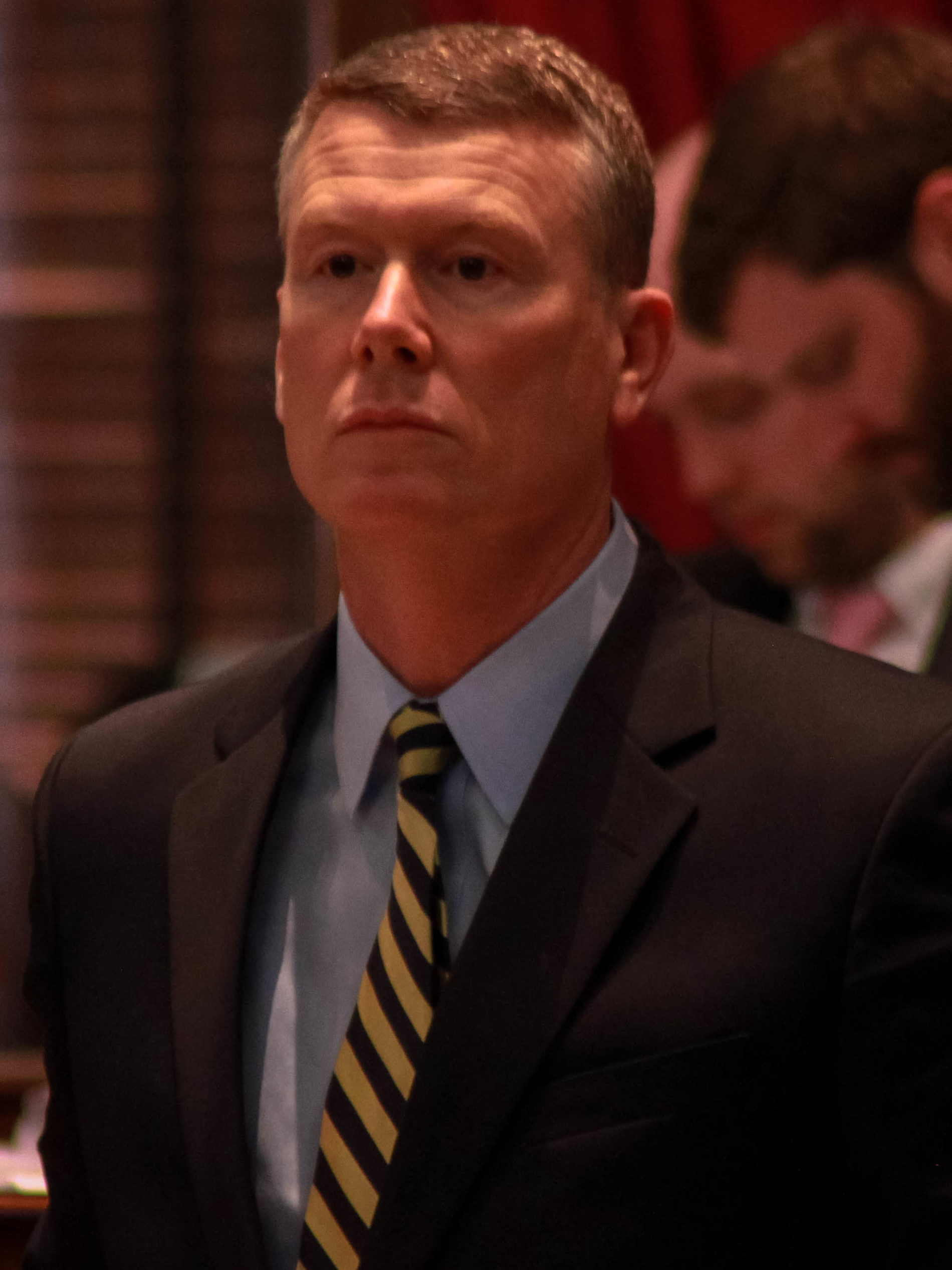
- Windle in 2014

Member of the Tennessee House of Representatives from the 41st district
- In office January 8, 1991 – January 10, 2023
- Succeeded by: Ed Butler

Personal details
- Born: May 21, 1962 (age 64) Cookeville, Tennessee, U.S.
- Party: Democratic (until 2022); Independent (2022–present)
- Education: University of Tennessee; University of Tennessee College of Law
- Profession: Attorney

Military service
- Branch/service: Tennessee Army National Guard
- Rank: Colonel

John Mark Windle (born May 21, 1962) is an American politician who is a former member of the Tennessee House of Representatives, representing District 41 from 1991 to 2023. In 2022, Windle filed to run as an independent after serving as a Democratic representative for nearly three decades, but lost re-election to Republican Ed Butler.

== Education ==
Windle earned his BS in finance from the University of Tennessee and his JD from the University of Tennessee College of Law.

== Elections ==
- 1990s Windle was initially elected in the November 6, 1990 General election and re-elected in the November 3, 1992 and November 8, 1994 elections.
- 1996 Windle was unopposed for both the 1996 Democratic Primary and the November 5, 1996 General election.
- 1998 Windle was unopposed for both the August 6, 1998 Democratic Primary, winning with 14,062 votes, and the November 3, 1998 General election, winning with 6,111 votes.
- 2000 Windle was unopposed for both the August 3, 2000 Democratic Primary, winning with 5,051 votes, and the November 7, 2000 General election, winning with 14,650 votes.
- 2002 Windle was unopposed for both the August 1, 2002 Democratic Primary, winning with 9,346 votes, and the November 5, 2002 General election, winning with 13,217 votes.
- 2004 Windle was unopposed for both the August 5, 2004 Democratic Primary, winning with 5,468 votes, and the November 2, 2004 General election, winning with 17,615 votes.
- 2006 Windle was unopposed for both the August 3, 2006 Democratic Primary, winning with 8,177 votes, and the November 7, 2006 General election, winning with 14,062 votes.
- 2008 Windle was challenged in the August 7, 2008 Democratic Primary, winning with 4,643 votes (92.3%), and was unopposed for the November 4, 2008 General election, winning with 17,025 votes.
- 2010 Windle was unopposed for the August 5, 2010 Democratic Primary, winning with 5,875 votes, and won the November 2, 2010 General election with 8,701 votes (64.1%) against Republican nominee Patrick McCurdy.
- 2012 Windle was unopposed for the August 2, 2012 Democratic Primary, winning with 3,147 votes, and won the November 6, 2012 General election with 12,785 votes (61.7%) against Republican nominee Bobby Stewart.
- 2014 Windle was unopposed for both the August 7, 2014 Democratic Primary, winning with 5,283 votes, and the November 4, 2014 General election, winning with 9,237 votes.
- 2016 Windle won re-election.
  Tennessee House of Representatives District 41 General Election, 2016
  Party	Candidate	Votes	%
  Democratic	John Windle (incumbent)	12,238	54.98%
  Republican	Ed Butler	10,021	45.02%
  Total votes		22,259	100.0
  Democratic hold			
- 2018 Windle won re-election.
- 2020 Windle won re-election.

=== 2022 ===
Windle switched from a Democrat to an independent and narrowly lost the general election.

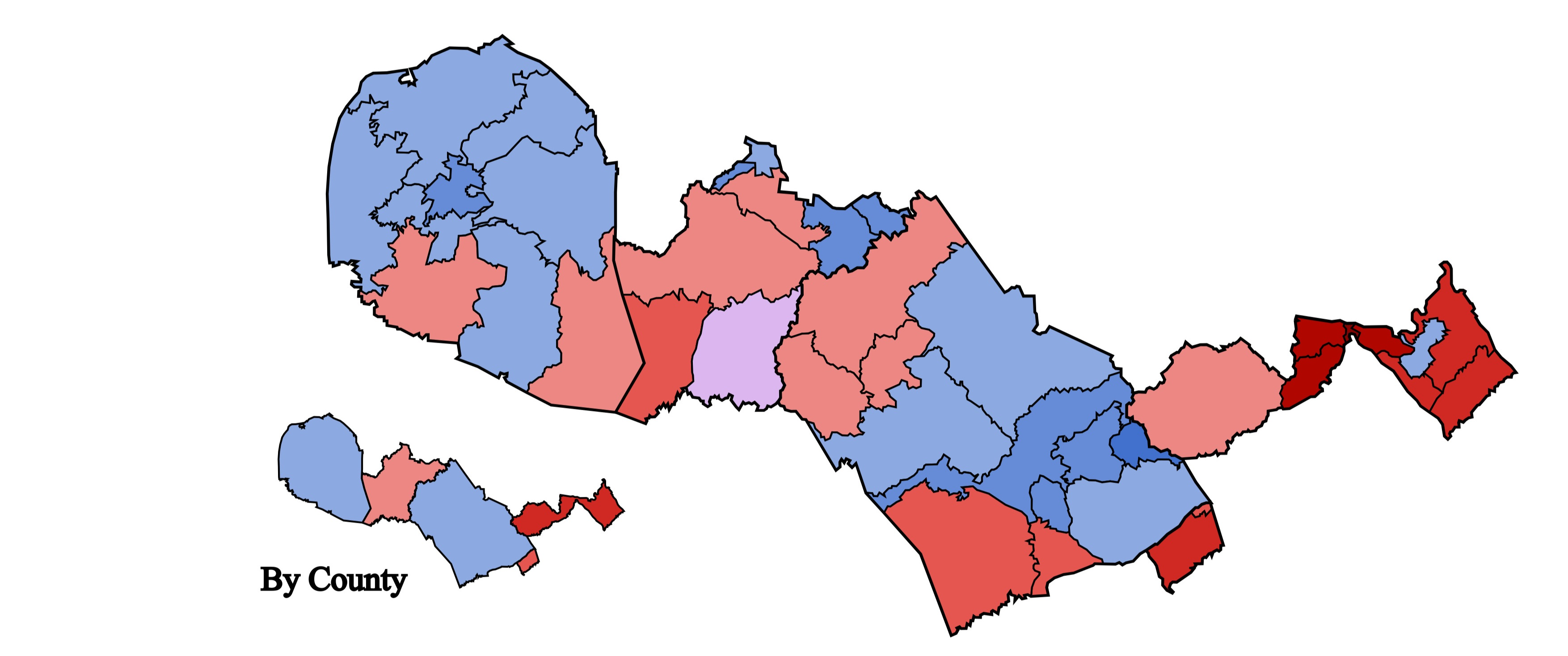
Results by precinct & county Butler: 80–90%; 70–80%; 60–70%; 50–60%; Windle: 70–80%; 60–70%; 50–60%; Tie: 50%

Republican primary
Party	Candidate	Votes	%
Republican	Ed Butler	4,119	53.44%
Republican	Michael Swisher	2,417	31.36%
Republican	Bradley Hayes	1,172	15.20%
Total votes		7,708	100.00%

Tennessee House of Representatives District 41 General Election, 2022
Party	Candidate	Votes	%
Republican	Ed Butler	9,079	52.59%
Independent	John Windle (incumbent)	8,184	47.41%
Total votes		17,263	100.00%
Republican gain from Independent			
