= Bob Ramsey (politician) =

American politician (born 1947)

Member of the Tennessee House of Representatives from the 20th district
- In office January 13, 2009 – January 10, 2023
- Preceded by: Doug Overbey
- Succeeded by: Bryan Richey

Personal details
- Born: March 13, 1947 (age 79)
- Party: Republican
- Spouse: Margaret Ramsey
- Children: 2
- Education: University of Tennessee (BS); University of Tennessee College of Dentistry (DDS)
- Website: House website

Robert "Bob" Ramsey (born 1947) is an American politician. He serves as a Republican member of the Tennessee House of Representatives for district 20, encompassing parts of Blount County, Tennessee.

== Biography ==
=== Early life ===
He was born on March 13, 1947. He received a Bachelor of Science in biology from the University of Tennessee in Knoxville, Tennessee, and a D.D.S. from the University of Tennessee Health Science Center in Memphis, Tennessee.

=== Career ===
He works as a dentist.

He is a state representative for the 20th District of Tennessee, having been reelected in 2012, 2014, 2016, 2018, and 2020. He supports efforts by the state legislature to reduce the number of bills proposed by individual lawmakers in order to reduce the backlog of legislations.

He is a member of the Blount County Board of Health, the Regional Solid Waste Authority, the Agricultural Extension Committee, the Community Action Agency, the Regional Planning Commission, and the Kiwanis Club of Maryville.

=== Personal life ===
He is married to Margaret Ramsey. They have two children, Heather and Haley, and two granddaughters, Valentina and Greer. He is a Baptist. He lives in Maryville, Tennessee.
