= Bryan Richey =

American politician (born 1980)

Member of the Tennessee House of Representatives from the 20th district
- In office January 10, 2023 – January 14, 2025
- Preceded by: Bob Ramsey
- Succeeded by: Tom Stinnett

Personal details
- Born: April 1, 1980 (age 46) Winter Garden, Florida, U.S.
- Party: Republican
- Spouse: Married
- Children: 2
- Education: Lake-Sumter State College
- Military career
- Allegiance: United States
- Branch: United States Navy
- Service years: 2004–2006

Bryan Richey (born April 1, 1980) is an American businessman, realtor, and politician from Tennessee. He represented the 20th district in the Tennessee House of Representatives from 2023 to 2025. A Republican, he assumed office on January 10, 2023.

== Early life, education, and business ==
Richey was born on April 1, 1980, in Winter Garden, Florida. He was raised in Apopka, Florida, where he graduated from Apopka High School, then onward to Lake Sumter State College in Leesburg, Florida. He later served in the United States Navy as an Mk-86 technician on the USS Gettysburg.

== Political career ==
=== 2020 election ===
Richey ran for the Tennessee House of Representatives in 2020 but lost the Republican primary.

=== 2022 election ===
In 2022, he ran for a second time in the Republican primary and won 64.8% of the vote, defeating 14-year incumbent Bob Ramsey. He ran unopposed in the general election.

=== Tenure as state representative ===
Richey assumed office as a member of the Tennessee House of Representatives on January 10, 2023.

Richey is a supporter of term limits in the Tennessee General Assembly. On January 11, 2023, he filed a bill (HB-118), which would require each Tennessee county to include a referendum on the ballot in the 2024 general elections, on the question of whether or not elected officials in counties and municipalities should only be allowed to serve a maximum of 16 years, whether or not it is consecutive. A week later, on January 19, 2023, he filed a constitutional amendment (HJR-45), which would create an amendment on the ballot in 2026, in similarity to HB-118, only for state elected officials, such as state representatives and senators.

In 2023, Richey supported a resolution to expel one of three Democratic lawmakers from the legislature for violating decorum rules. The expulsion was widely characterized as unprecedented.

== Electoral history ==
2020 Republican primary: Tennessee House of Representatives 20th district
Party	Candidate	Votes	%
Republican	Bob Ramsey	4,879	68.2%
Republican	Bryan Richey	2,275	31.8%

2022 Republican primary: Tennessee House of Representatives 20th district
Party	Candidate	Votes	%
Republican	Bryan Richey	3,802	64.8%
Republican	Bob Ramsey	2,061	35.2%

2022 general election: Tennessee House of Representatives 20th district
Party	Candidate	Votes	%
Republican	Bryan Richey	14,562	100.0%

== Personal life ==
Richey lives in Maryville, Tennessee. He is married with two children. He is a Baptist.
