= 2020 Tennessee House of Representatives election =

- November 3, 2020

99 Seats in the Tennessee House of Representatives 50 seats needed for a majority
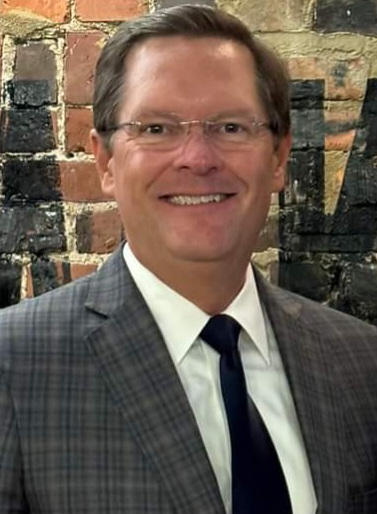

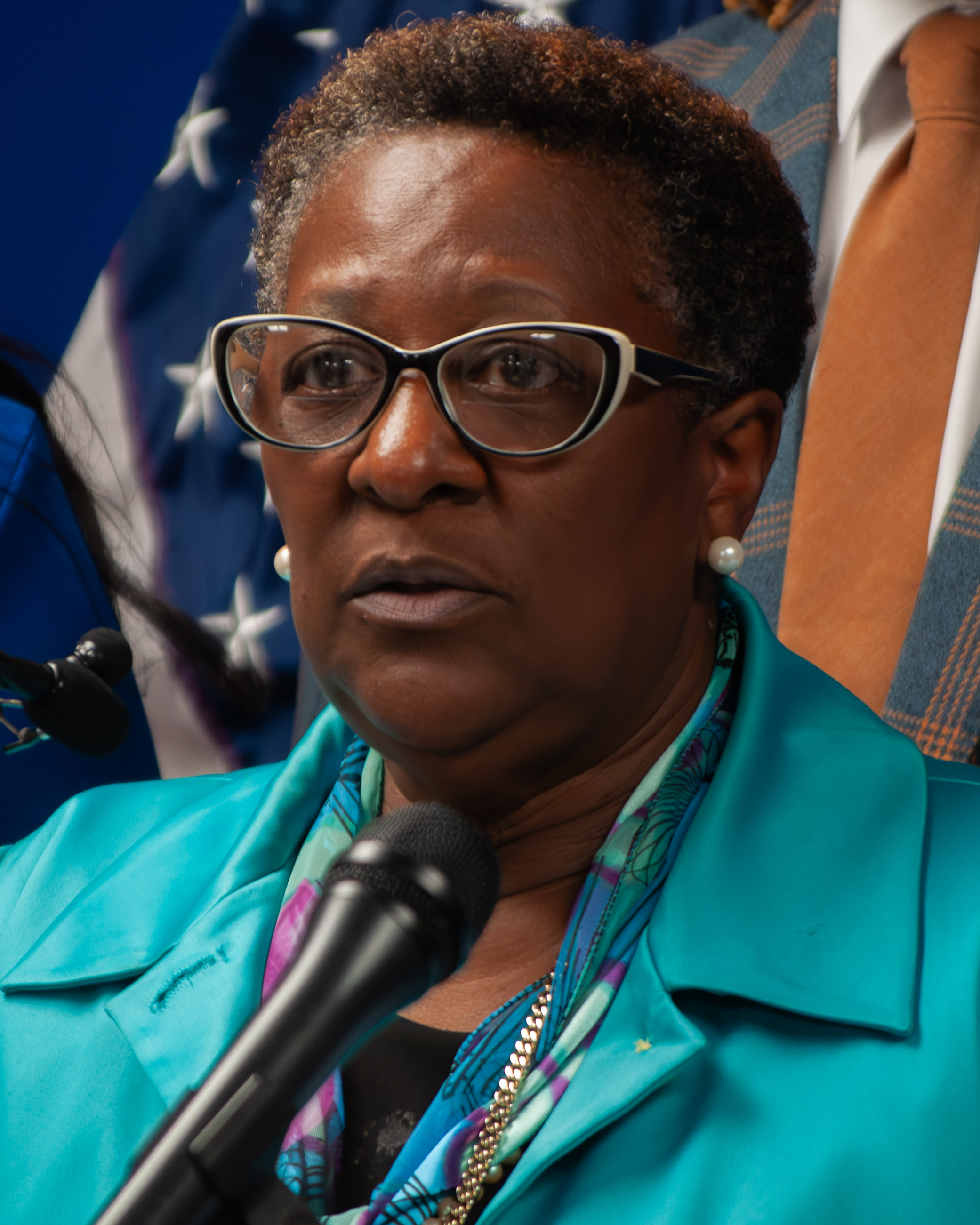

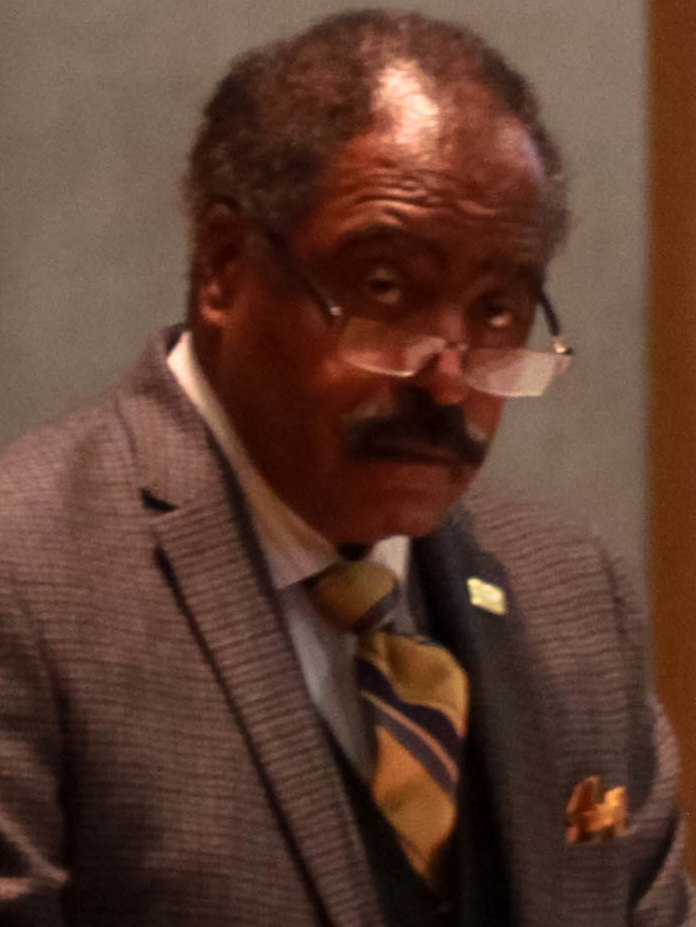
| | Majority party | Minority party | Third party |
|---|---|---|---|
| Leader | Cameron Sexton | Karen Camper | John DeBerry (lost re-election) |
| Party | Republican | Democratic | Independent |
| Leader's seat | 25th: Crossville | 87th: Memphis | 90th: Memphis |
| Last election | 73 seats | 26 seats | 0 seats |
| Seats before | 73 | 25 | 1 |
| Seats won | 73 | 26 | 0 |
| Seat change | Steady | ▲1 | ▼1 |
| Popular vote | 1,740,193 | 800,069 | 46,611 |
| Percentage | 67.24% | 30.92% | 1.80% |
| Swing | ▲7.54% | ▼8.33% | ▲0.75% |
- Democratic gain Republican hold Democratic hold 50–60% 60–70% 70–80% 80–90% >90% 50–60% 60–70% 70–80% >90%
Speaker of the House before election
Cameron Sexton
Republican
Elected Speaker of the House
Cameron Sexton
Republican

The 2020 Tennessee House of Representatives election was held on November 3, 2020, to elect 99 seats for the Tennessee House of Representatives. The elections coincided with the Presidential, U.S. Senate, U.S. House, and State Senate elections.

The Democratic Party regained control of the 90th district. Incumbent Rep. John DeBerry, who had represented the district as a Democrat for many years, was removed from the Tennessee Democratic Party’s primary ballot by the party’s State Executive Committee after voting against key Democratic positions, including on abortion and other issues; his anti-abortion stance was cited as a significant factor in that decision. DeBerry subsequently ran for re-election as an independent. After losing his bid for another term, Governor Bill Lee appointed DeBerry to serve as a senior advisor in his administration.

The Republican Party maintained their supermajority in the state house, retaining all 73 seats.

== Retirements ==
Five Republican representatives chose to retire, one of whom sought election to another office. No Democrat representatives chose to retire.

1. District 3: Timothy Hill retired to run for the U.S. House of Representatives in Tennessee's 1st congressional district.
2. District 16: Bill Dunn retired.
3. District 18: Martin Daniel retired.
4. District 76: Andrew Holt retired.
5. District 97: Jim Coley retired.

== Incumbents defeated ==
=== In primary elections ===
==== Republicans ====
Three Republicans lost renomination.

1. District 6: James Van Huss lost renomination to Tim Hicks.
2. District 7: Matthew Hill lost renomination to Rebecca Alexander.
3. District 92: Rick Tillis lost renomination to Todd Warner.

==== Democrats ====
Two Democrats lost renomination.

1. District 15: Rick Staples lost renomination to Sam McKenzie.
2. District 90: John DeBerry lost renomination to Torrey Harris. (Note: After losing renomination in the Democratic Primary, DeBerry became an Independent and unsuccessfully ran in the general election.)

=== In general elections ===
==== Independents ====
One Independent lost re-election to a Democrat.

1. District 90: John DeBerry lost to Torrey Harris.

== Predictions ==
| Source | Ranking | As of |
|---|---|---|
| The Cook Political Report | Safe R | October 21, 2020 |

== Results summary ==
Summary of the November 3, 2020 Tennessee House election results
| Party | Candidates | Votes | | Seats | |
| Party | Candidates | No. | % | No. | +/– |
|---|---|---|---|---|---|
| Republican | 79 | 1,740,193 | 67.24% | 73 | Steady |
| Democratic | 58 (+1 write-in) | 800,069 | 30.92% | 26 | ▲1 |
| Independent | 8 | 46,611 | 1.80% | 0 | ▼1 |
| Write-in | | 974 | 0.04% | 0 | Steady |
| Total | | 2,587,847 | 100.00% | 99 | Steady |

Popular vote
| Republican | 67.24% |
| Democratic | 30.92% |
| Independent | 1.80% |
| Write-ins | 0.04% |

House seats
| Republican | 73.74% |
| Democratic | 26.26% |

=== Close races ===
Seven races were decided by a margin of under 10%:

| District | Winner | Margin |
|---|---|---|
| District 97 | Republican | 1.6% |
| District 13 | Democratic | 5.8% |
| District 49 | Republican | 7.8% |
| District 83 | Republican | 8.0% |
| District 56 | Democratic | 8.4% |
| District 18 | Republican | 9.8% |
| District 67 | Democratic | 9.8% |

== Overview ==
| District | Incumbent | | | Results | Candidates |
| District | Representative | Party | Electoral history | Results | Candidates |
|---|---|---|---|---|---|
| District 1 | John Crawford | Republican | 2016 | Incumbent re-elected. | ▌ ✓ John Crawford (Republican) |
| District 2 | Bud Hulsey | Republican | 2014 | Incumbent re-elected. | ▌ ✓ Bud Hulsey (Republican) 77.1%; ▌Arvil Love Jr. (Democratic) 22.9% |
| District 3 | Timothy Hill | Republican | 2012 | Incumbent retired to run for the US House. New member elected. Republican Hold | ▌ ✓ Scotty Campbell (Republican) |
| District 4 | John Holsclaw Jr. | Republican | 2014 | Incumbent re-elected. | ▌ ✓ John Holsclaw Jr. (Republican) 81.4%; ▌ Bobby Harrell (Democratic) 18.6% |
| District 5 | David Hawk | Republican | 2002 | Incumbent re-elected. | ▌ ✓ David Hawk (Republican) |
| District 6 | James Van Huss | Republican | 2012 | Incumbent lost renomination. New member elected. Republican Hold. | ▌ ✓ Tim Hicks (Republican) 72.7%; ▌ Brad Batt (Democratic) 17.3% |
| District 7 | Matthew Hill | Republican | 2004 | Incumbent lost renomination. New member elected. Republican hold. | ▌ ✓ Rebecca Alexander (Republican) |
| District 8 | Jerome Moon | Republican | 2017 | Incumbent re-elected. | ▌ ✓ Jerome Moon (Republican) 74.9%; ▌Jay Clark (Democratic) 15.1% |
| District 9 | Gary Hicks | Republican | 2016 | Incumbent re-elected. | ▌ ✓ Gary Hicks (Republican) |
| District 10 | Rick Eldridge | Republican | 2018 | Incumbent re-elected. | ▌ ✓ Rick Eldridge (Republican) |
| District 11 | Jeremy Faison | Republican | 2010 | Incumbent re-elected. | ▌ ✓ Jeremy Faison (Republican) |
| District 12 | Dale Carr | Republican | 2012 | Incumbent re-elected. | ▌ ✓ Dale Carr (Republican) 81.3%; ▌Bennett Lapides (Democratic) 18.7% |
| District 13 | Gloria Johnson | Democratic | 2018 | Incumbent re-elected. | ▌ ✓ Gloria Johnson (Democratic) 52.9%; ▌Elaine Davis (Republican) 47.1% |
| District 14 | Jason Zachary | Republican | 2015 | Incumbent re-elected. | ▌ ✓ Jason Zachary (Republican) 64.6%; ▌Justin Davis (Democratic) 35.4% |
| District 15 | Rick Staples | Democratic | 2016 | Incumbent lost renomination. New member elected. Democratic Hold. | ▌ ✓ Sam McKenzie (Democratic) 72.9%; ▌Troy Jones (Independent) 27.1% |
| District 16 | Bill Dunn | Republican | 1994 | Incumbent retired. New member elected. Republican Hold. | ▌ ✓ Michele Carringer (Republican) 69.3%; ▌Elizabeth Rowland (Democratic) 30.7% |
| District 17 | Andrew Farmer | Republican | 2012 | Incumbent re-elected. | ▌ ✓ Andrew Farmer (Republican) 81.4%; ▌Delynn McCash (Democratic) 18.6% |
| District 18 | Martin Daniel | Republican | 2014 | Incumbent retired. New member elected. Republican Hold. | ▌ ✓ Eddie Mannis (Republican) 54.8%; ▌Virginia Couch (Democratic) 45.2% |
| District 19 | Dave Wright | Republican | 2018 | Incumbent re-elected. | ▌ ✓ Dave Wright (Republican) |
| District 20 | Bob Ramsey | Republican | 2008 | Incumbent re-elected. | ▌ ✓ Bob Ramsey (Republican) 72.9%; ▌Susan Sneed (Democratic) 27.1% |
| District 21 | Lowell Russell | Republican | 2018 | Incumbent re-elected. | ▌ ✓ Lowell Russell (Republican) |
| District 22 | Dan Howell | Republican | 2014 | Incumbent re-elected. | ▌ ✓ Dan Howell (Republican) |
| District 23 | Mark Cochran | Republican | 2018 | Incumbent re-elected. | ▌ ✓ Mark Cochran (Republican) 86.7%; ▌David Fankhauser (Independent) 13.3% |
| District 24 | Mark Hall | Republican | 2018 | Incumbent re-elected. | ▌ ✓ Mark Hall (Republican) 76.4%; ▌Daniel Jones (Democratic) 23.6% |
| District 25 | Cameron Sexton | Republican | 2010 | Incumbent re-elected. | ▌ ✓ Cameron Sexton (Republican) 81.6%; ▌Robyn Deck (Democratic) 18.4% |
| District 26 | Robin Smith | Republican | 2018 | Incumbent re-elected. | ▌ ✓ Robin Smith (Republican) 64.7%; ▌Joan Farrell (Democratic) 35.3% |
| District 27 | Patsy Hazlewood | Republican | 2014 | Incumbent re-elected. | ▌ ✓ Patsy Hazlewood (Republican) |
| District 28 | Yusuf Hakeem | Democratic | 2018 | Incumbent re-elected. | ▌ ✓ Yusuf Hakeem (Democratic) |
| District 29 | Mike Carter | Republican | 2012 | Incumbent re-elected. | ▌ ✓ Mike Carter (Republican) |
| District 30 | Esther Helton | Republican | 2018 | Incumbent re-elected. | ▌ ✓ Esther Helton (Republican) 61.7%; ▌Joseph Udeaja (Democratic) 38.3% |
| District 31 | Ron Travis | Republican | 2012 | Incumbent re-elected. | ▌ ✓ Ron Travis (Republican) 83.0%; ▌Dean Sparks (Democratic) 17.0% |
| District 32 | Kent Calfee | Republican | 2012 | Incumbent re-elected. | ▌ ✓ Kent Calfee (Republican) |
| District 33 | John Ragan | Republican | 2010 | Incumbent re-elected. | ▌ ✓ John Ragan (Republican) |
| District 34 | Tim Rudd | Republican | 2016 | Incumbent re-elected. | ▌ ✓ Tim Rudd (Republican) 61.6%; ▌Mary Vaughn (Democratic) 38.4% |
| District 35 | Jerry Sexton | Republican | 2014 | Incumbent re-elected. | ▌ ✓ Jerry Sexton (Republican) |
| District 36 | Dennis Powers | Republican | 2010 | Incumbent re-elected. | ▌ ✓ Dennis Powers (Republican) 82.5%; ▌CJ Mitchell (Democratic) 17.5% |
| District 37 | Charlie Baum | Republican | 2018 | Incumbent re-elected. | ▌ ✓ Charlie Baum (Republican) 58.1%; ▌Mariah Phillips (Democratic) 41.9% |
| District 38 | Kelly Keisling | Republican | 2010 | Incumbent re-elected. | ▌ ✓ Kelly Keisling (Republican) 85.6%; ▌Carol Veneá Abney (Democratic) 14.4% |
| District 39 | Iris Rudder | Republican | 2018 | Incumbent re-elected. | ▌ ✓ Iris Rudder (Republican) |
| District 40 | Terri Lynn Weaver | Republican | 2016 | Incumbent re-elected. | ▌ ✓ Terri Lynn Weaver (Republican) 78.8%; ▌Paddy Sizemore (Independent) 21.2% |
| District 41 | John Windle | Democratic | 1994 | Incumbent re-elected. | ▌ ✓ John Windle (Democratic) |
| District 42 | Ryan Williams | Republican | 2010 | Incumbent re-elected. | ▌ ✓ Ryan Williams (Republican) |
| District 43 | Paul Sherrell | Republican | 2016 | Incumbent re-elected. | ▌ ✓ Paul Sherrell (Republican) 79.7%; ▌Luke Cameron (Independent) 20.3% |
| District 44 | William Lamberth | Republican | 2012 | Incumbent re-elected. | ▌ ✓ William Lamberth (Republican) |
| District 45 | Johnny Garrett | Republican | 2018 | Incumbent re-elected. | ▌ ✓ Johnny Garrett (Republican) |
| District 46 | Clark Boyd | Republican | 2018 | Incumbent re-elected. | ▌ ✓ Clark Boyd (Republican) |
| District 47 | Rush Bricken | Republican | 2018 | Incumbent re-elected. | ▌ ✓ Rush Bricken (Republican) |
| District 48 | Bryan Terry | Republican | 2014 | Incumbent re-elected. | ▌ ✓ Bryan Terry (Republican) 61.7%; ▌Matt Ferry (Democratic) 38.3% |
| District 49 | Mike Sparks | Republican | 2010 | Incumbent re-elected. | ▌ ✓ Mike Sparks (Republican) 53.9%; ▌Brandon Thomas (Democratic) 46.1% |
| District 50 | Bo Mitchell | Democratic | 2012 | Incumbent re-elected. | ▌ ✓ Bo Mitchell (Democratic) |
| District 51 | Bill Beck | Democratic | 2014 | Incumbent re-elected. | ▌ ✓ Bill Beck (Democratic) |
| District 52 | Mike Stewart | Democratic | 2008 | Incumbent re-elected. | ▌ ✓ Mike Stewart (Democratic) 72.0%; ▌Donna Tees (Republican) 28.0% |
| District 53 | Jason Powell | Democratic | 2012 | Incumbent re-elected. | ▌ ✓ Jason Powell (Democratic) |
| District 54 | Vincent Dixie | Democratic | 2018 | Incumbent re-elected. | ▌ ✓ Vincent Dixie (Democratic) |
| District 55 | John Ray Clemmons | Democratic | 2014 | Incumbent re-elected. | ▌ ✓ John Ray Clemmons (Democratic) |
| District 56 | Bob Freeman | Democratic | 2018 | Incumbent re-elected. | ▌ ✓ Bob Freeman (Democratic) 54.2%; ▌Diane Michel Canada (Republican) 45.8% |
| District 57 | Susan Lynn | Republican | 2013 | Incumbent re-elected. | ▌ ✓ Susan Lynn (Republican) 69.5%; ▌Tom Sottek (Independent) 30.5% |
| District 58 | Harold Love | Democratic | 2012 | Incumbent re-elected. | ▌ ✓ Harold Love (Democratic) |
| District 59 | Jason Potts | Democratic | 2018 | Incumbent re-elected. | ▌ ✓ Jason Potts (Democratic) |
| District 60 | Darren Jernigan | Democratic | 2016 | Incumbent re-elected. | ▌ ✓ Darren Jernigan (Democratic) |
| District 61 | Brandon Ogles | Republican | 2018 | Incumbent re-elected. | ▌ ✓ Brandon Ogles (Republican) 65.9%; ▌Sam Bledsoe (Democratic) 34.1% |
| District 62 | Pat Marsh | Republican | 2009 | Incumbent re-elected. | ▌ ✓ Pat Marsh (Republican) 99.1%; ▌Tre Stewart (write-in) 0.9% |
| District 63 | Glen Casada | Republican | 2002 | Incumbent re-elected. | ▌ ✓ Glen Casada (Republican) 59.6%; ▌Elizabeth Maderia (Democratic) 32.3%; ▌Brad Fiscus (Independent) 8.1% |
| District 64 | Scott Cepicky | Republican | 2018 | Incumbent re-elected. | ▌ ✓ Scott Cepicky (Republican) 71.1%; ▌James Campbell (Democratic) 28.9% |
| District 65 | Sam Whitson | Republican | 2016 | Incumbent re-elected. | ▌ ✓ Sam Whitson (Republican) 68.1%; ▌Jennifer Foley (Democratic) 31.9% |
| District 66 | Sabi "Doc" Kumar | Republican | 2014 | Incumbent re-elected. | ▌ ✓ Sabi "Doc" Kumar (Republican) 77.6%; ▌Jarvus Turnley (Democratic) 22.4% |
| District 67 | Jason Hodges | Democratic | 2018 | Incumbent re-elected. | ▌ ✓ Jason Hodges (Democratic) 54.9%; ▌John Dawson (Republican) 45.1% |
| District 68 | Curtis Johnson | Republican | 2004 | Incumbent re-elected. | ▌ ✓ Curtis Johnson (Republican) |
| District 69 | Michael Curcio | Republican | 2016 | Incumbent re-elected. | ▌ ✓ Michael Curcio (Republican) 70.3%; ▌Eddie Johnson (Democratic) 29.7% |
| District 70 | Clay Doggett | Republican | 2018 | Incumbent re-elected. | ▌ ✓ Clay Doggett (Republican) |
| District 71 | David Byrd | Republican | 2014 | Incumbent re-elected. | ▌ ✓ David Byrd (Republican) |
| District 72 | Kirk Haston | Republican | 2018 | Incumbent re-elected. | ▌ ✓ Kirk Haston (Republican) |
| District 73 | Chris Todd | Republican | 2018 | Incumbent re-elected. | ▌ ✓ Chris Todd (Republican) |
| District 74 | Jay Reedy | Republican | 2014 | Incumbent re-elected. | ▌ ✓ Jay Reedy (Republican) |
| District 75 | Bruce Griffey | Republican | 2018 | Incumbent re-elected. | ▌ ✓ Bruce Griffey (Republican) 81.3%; ▌James Hart (Independent) 18.7% |
| District 76 | Andrew Holt | Republican | 2010 | Incumbent retired. New member elected. Republican hold. | ▌ ✓ Tandy Darby (Republican) 76.0%; ▌Jeffery Washburn (Independent) 24.0% |
| District 77 | Rusty Grills | Republican | 2020 (Special Election) | Incumbent re-elected. | ▌ ✓ Rusty Grills (Republican) |
| District 78 | Mary Littleton | Republican | 2012 | Incumbent re-elected. | ▌ ✓ Mary Littleton (Republican) 72.2%; ▌Holly Spann (Democratic) 27.8% |
| District 79 | Curtis Halford | Republican | 2008 | Incumbent re-elected. | ▌ ✓ Curtis Halford (Republican) |
| District 80 | Johnny Shaw | Democratic | 2000 | Incumbent re-elected. | ▌ ✓ Johnny Shaw (Democratic) |
| District 81 | Debra Moody | Republican | 2012 | Incumbent re-elected. | ▌ ✓ Debra Moody (Republican) |
| District 82 | Chris Hurt | Republican | 2018 | Incumbent re-elected. | ▌ ✓ Chris Hurt (Republican) 58.9%; ▌Andrea Bond Johnson (Democratic) 41.1% |
| District 83 | Mark White | Republican | 2010 | Incumbent re-elected. | ▌ ✓ Mark White (Republican) 54.0%; ▌Jerri Green (Democratic) 46.0% |
| District 84 | Joe Towns | Democratic | 1994 | Incumbent re-elected. | ▌ ✓ Joe Towns (Democratic) |
| District 85 | Jesse Chism | Democratic | 2018 | Incumbent re-elected. | ▌ ✓ Jesse Chism (Democratic) |
| District 86 | Barbara Cooper | Democratic | 1996 | Incumbent re-elected. | ▌ ✓ Barbara Cooper (Democratic) 72.7%; ▌Rob White (Republican) 17.3% |
| District 87 | Karen Camper | Democratic | 2008 | Incumbent re-elected. | ▌ ✓ Karen Camper (Democratic) |
| District 88 | Larry Miller | Democratic | 1994 | Incumbent re-elected. | ▌ ✓ Larry Miller (Democratic) |
| District 89 | Justin Lafferty | Republican | 2018 | Incumbent re-elected. | ▌ ✓ Justin Lafferty (Republican) 70.1%; ▌Greg Mills (Independent) 27.7%; ▌Kari Keeling (Democratic) (write-in) 2.2% |
| District 90 | John DeBerry | Independent | 1994 | Incumbent lost re-election. New member elected. Democratic gain. | ▌ ✓ Torrey Harris (Democratic) 77.3%; ▌John DeBerry (Independent) 22.7% |
| District 91 | London Lamar | Democratic | 2018 | Incumbent re-elected. | ▌ ✓ London Lamar (Democratic) |
| District 92 | Thomas R. Tillis | Republican | 2016 | Incumbent lost renomination. New member elected. Republican hold. | ▌ ✓ Todd Warner (Republican) |
| District 93 | G. A. Hardaway | Democratic | 2006 | Incumbent re-elected. | ▌ ✓ G. A. Hardaway (Democratic) 99.9%; ▌Michael A Minnis (write-in) 0.1% |
| District 94 | Ron Gant | Republican | 2016 | Incumbent re-elected. | ▌ ✓ Ron Gant (Republican) |
| District 95 | Kevin Vaughan | Republican | 2017 | Incumbent re-elected. | ▌ ✓ Kevin Vaughan (Republican) 69.7%; ▌Lynnette Williams (Democratic) 30.3% |
| District 96 | Dwayne Thompson | Democratic | 2016 | Incumbent re-elected. | ▌ ✓ Dwayne Thompson (Democratic) 59.2%; ▌Patricia Possel (Republican) 40.8% |
| District 97 | Jim Coley | Republican | 2006 | Incumbent retired. New member elected. Republican hold. | ▌ ✓ John Gillespie (Republican) 50.8%; ▌Gabby Salinas (Democratic) 49.2% |
| District 98 | Antonio Parkinson | Democratic | 2011 | Incumbent re-elected. | ▌ ✓ Antonio Parkinson (Democratic) |
| District 99 | Tom Leatherwood | Republican | 2018 | Incumbent re-elected. | ▌ ✓ Tom Leatherwood (Republican) |

== Results ==
=== District 1 ===
Republican primary
| Party | Candidate | Votes | % |
|---|---|---|---|
| Republican | John Crawford (incumbent) | 5,724 | 100.00 |
| Total votes | | 5,724 | 100.00 |

General election
| Party | Candidate | Votes | % |
|---|---|---|---|
| Republican | John Crawford (incumbent) | 22,456 | 100.00 |
| Total votes | | 22,456 | 100.00 |
| Republican hold | | | |

=== District 2 ===
Republican primary
| Party | Candidate | Votes | % |
|---|---|---|---|
| Republican | Bud Hulsey (incumbent) | 8,668 | 100.00 |
| Total votes | | 8,668 | 100.00 |

Democratic primary
| Party | Candidate | Votes | % |
|---|---|---|---|
| Democratic | Arvil Love Jr. | 1,248 | 100.00 |
| Total votes | | 1,248 | 100.00 |

General election
| Party | Candidate | Votes | % |
|---|---|---|---|
| Republican | Bud Hulsey (incumbent) | 23,315 | 77.12 |
| Democratic | Arvil Love Jr. | 6,915 | 22.88 |
| Total votes | | 30,230 | 100.00 |
| Republican hold | | | |

=== District 3 ===
Republican primary
| Party | Candidate | Votes | % |
|---|---|---|---|
| Republican | Scotty Campbell | 6,376 | 73.48 |
| Republican | Neal Kerney | 2,301 | 26.52 |
| Total votes | | 8,677 | 100.00 |

General election
| Party | Candidate | Votes | % |
|---|---|---|---|
| Republican | Scotty Campbell | 23,878 | 100.00 |
| Total votes | | 23,878 | 100.00 |
| Republican hold | | | |

=== District 4 ===
Republican primary
| Party | Candidate | Votes | % |
|---|---|---|---|
| Republican | John Holsclaw Jr. (incumbent) | 5,682 | 62.70% |
| Republican | Bob Acuff | 1,865 | 20.58% |
| Republican | Tim Lingerfelt | 1,516 | 16.72% |
| Total votes | | 9,063 | 100.00% |

Democratic Primary
| Party | Candidate | Votes | % |
|---|---|---|---|
| Democratic | Bobby Harrell | 825 | 100.00% |
| Total votes | | 825 | 100.00% |

Tennessee House of Representatives District 4 General Election, 2020
| Party | Candidate | Votes | % |
|---|---|---|---|
| Republican | John Holsclaw Jr. (incumbent) | 20,582 | 81.39% |
| Democratic | Bobby Harrell | 4,708 | 18.61% |
| Total votes | | 25,290 | 100.00% |
| Republican hold | | | |

=== District 5 ===
Republican primary
| Party | Candidate | Votes | % |
|---|---|---|---|
| Republican | David Hawk (incumbent) | 6,384 | 100.00% |
| Total votes | | 6,384 | 100.00% |

Tennessee House of Representatives District 5 General Election, 2020
| Party | Candidate | Votes | % |
|---|---|---|---|
| Republican | David Hawk | 21,277 | 100.00% |
| Total votes | | 21,277 | 100.00% |
| Republican hold | | | |

=== District 6 ===
Republican primary
| Party | Candidate | Votes | % |
|---|---|---|---|
| Republican | Tim Hicks | 5,412 | 57.52% |
| Republican | James Van Huss (incumbent) | 3,997 | 42.48% |
| Total votes | | 9,409 | 100.00% |

Democratic Primary
| Party | Candidate | Votes | % |
|---|---|---|---|
| Democratic | Brad Batt | 1,417 | 100.00% |
| Total votes | | 1,417 | 100.00% |

Tennessee House of Representatives District 4 General Election, 2020
| Party | Candidate | Votes | % |
|---|---|---|---|
| Republican | Tim Hicks | 21,557 | 72.67% |
| Democratic | Brad Batt | 8,107 | 27.33% |
| Total votes | | 29,664 | 100.00% |
| Republican hold | | | |

=== District 7 ===
Republican primary
| Party | Candidate | Votes | % |
|---|---|---|---|
| Republican | Rebecca Alexander | 5,081 | 63.11% |
| Republican | Matthew Hill (incumbent) | 2,970 | 36.89% |
| Total votes | | 8,051 | 100.00% |

Tennessee House of Representatives District 7 General Election, 2020
| Party | Candidate | Votes | % |
|---|---|---|---|
| Republican | Rebecca Alexander | 18,136 | 100.00% |
| Total votes | | 18,136 | 100.00% |
| Republican hold | | | |

=== District 8 ===
Republican primary
| Party | Candidate | Votes | % |
|---|---|---|---|
| Republican | Jerome Moon (incumbent) | 6,931 | 100.00% |
| Total votes | | 6,931 | 100.00% |

Democratic Primary
| Party | Candidate | Votes | % |
|---|---|---|---|
| Democratic | Jay Clark | 1,734 | 100.00% |
| Total votes | | 1,734 | 100.00% |

Tennessee House of Representatives District 8 General Election, 2020
| Party | Candidate | Votes | % |
|---|---|---|---|
| Republican | Jerome Moon (incumbent) | 23,762 | 74.88% |
| Democratic | Jay Clark | 7,971 | 25.12% |
| Total votes | | 31,733 | 100.00% |
| Republican hold | | | |

=== District 9 ===
Republican primary
| Party | Candidate | Votes | % |
|---|---|---|---|
| Republican | Gary Hicks (incumbent) | 6,057 | 100.00% |
| Total votes | | 6,057 | 100.00% |

Tennessee House of Representatives District 9 General Election, 2020
| Party | Candidate | Votes | % |
|---|---|---|---|
| Republican | Gary Hicks (incumbent) | 21,132 | 100.00% |
| Total votes | | 21,132 | 100.00% |
| Republican hold | | | |

=== District 10 ===
Republican primary
| Party | Candidate | Votes | % |
|---|---|---|---|
| Republican | Rick Eldridge (incumbent) | 3,967 | 100.00% |
| Total votes | | 3,967 | 100.00% |

Tennessee House of Representatives District 10 General Election, 2020
| Party | Candidate | Votes | % |
|---|---|---|---|
| Republican | Rick Eldridge (incumbent) | 17,156 | 100.00% |
| Total votes | | 17,156 | 100.00% |
| Republican hold | | | |

=== District 11 ===
Republican primary
| Party | Candidate | Votes | % |
|---|---|---|---|
| Republican | Jeremy Faison (incumbent) | 5,768 | 100.00% |
| Total votes | | 5,768 | 100.00% |

Tennessee House of Representatives District 11 General Election, 2020
| Party | Candidate | Votes | % |
|---|---|---|---|
| Republican | Jeremy Faison (incumbent) | 19,693 | 100.00% |
| Total votes | | 19,693 | 100.00% |
| Republican hold | | | |

=== District 12 ===
Republican primary
| Party | Candidate | Votes | % |
|---|---|---|---|
| Republican | Dale Carr (incumbent) | 6,675 | 100.00% |
| Total votes | | 6,675 | 100.00% |

Democratic primary
| Party | Candidate | Votes | % |
|---|---|---|---|
| Democratic | Bennett Lapides | 930 | 100.00% |
| Total votes | | 930 | 100.00% |

Tennessee House of Representatives District 12 General Election, 2020
| Party | Candidate | Votes | % |
|---|---|---|---|
| Republican | Dale Carr (incumbent) | 23,858 | 81.26% |
| Democratic | Bennett Lapides | 5,502 | 18.74% |
| Total votes | | 29,360 | 100.00% |
| Republican hold | | | |

=== District 13 ===
Democratic primary
| Party | Candidate | Votes | % |
|---|---|---|---|
| Democratic | Gloria Johnson (incumbent) | 5,031 | 100.00% |
| Total votes | | 5,031 | 100.00% |

Republican primary
| Party | Candidate | Votes | % |
|---|---|---|---|
| Republican | Elaine Davis | 4,066 | 100.00% |
| Total votes | | 4,066 | 100.00% |

Tennessee House of Representatives District 13 General Election, 2020
| Party | Candidate | Votes | % |
|---|---|---|---|
| Democratic | Gloria Johnson (incumbent) | 14,242 | 52.9% |
| Republican | Elaine Davis | 12,664 | 47.1% |
| Total votes | | 29,906 | 100.00% |
| Democratic hold | | | |

=== District 14 ===
Republican primary
| Party | Candidate | Votes | % |
|---|---|---|---|
| Republican | Jason Zachary (incumbent) | 9,039 | 100.00% |
| Total votes | | 9,039 | 100.00% |

Democratic primary
| Party | Candidate | Votes | % |
|---|---|---|---|
| Democratic | Justin Davis | 3,673 | 100.00% |
| Total votes | | 3,673 | 100.00% |

Tennessee House of Representatives District 14 General Election, 2020
| Party | Candidate | Votes | % |
|---|---|---|---|
| Republican | Jason Zachary (incumbent) | 26,539 | 64.6% |
| Democratic | Justin Davis | 14,558 | 35.4% |
| Total votes | | 41,097 | 100.00% |
| Republican hold | | | |

=== District 15 ===
Democratic primary
| Party | Candidate | Votes | % |
|---|---|---|---|
| Democratic | Sam McKenzie | 2,032 | 39.6% |
| Democratic | Matthew Park | 2,007 | 39.1% |
| Democratic | Rick Staples (incumbent) | 1,095 | 21.3 |
| Total votes | | 5,134 | 100.00% |

Tennessee House of Representatives District 15 General Election, 2020
| Party | Candidate | Votes | % |
|---|---|---|---|
| Democratic | Sam McKenzie | 13,158 | 72.9% |
| Independent | Troy Jones | 4,887 | 27.1% |
| Total votes | | 18,045 | 100.00% |
| Democratic hold | | | |

=== District 16 ===
Republican primary
| Party | Candidate | Votes | % |
|---|---|---|---|
| Republican | Michele Carringer | 4,657 | 58.2% |
| Republican | Patti Lou Bounds | 3,343 | 41.8% |
| Total votes | | 8,000 | 100.00% |

Democratic primary
| Party | Candidate | Votes | % |
|---|---|---|---|
| Democratic | Elizabeth Rowland | 2,521 | 100.00% |
| Total votes | | 2,521 | 100.00% |

Tennessee House of Representatives District 16 General Election, 2020
| Party | Candidate | Votes | % |
|---|---|---|---|
| Republican | Michele Carringer | 21,438 | 69.3% |
| Democratic | Elizabeth Rowland | 9,517 | 30.7% |
| Total votes | | 30,955 | 100.00% |
| Republican hold | | | |

=== District 17 ===
Republican primary
| Party | Candidate | Votes | % |
|---|---|---|---|
| Republican | Andrew Farmer (incumbent) | 6,064 | 100 |
| Total votes | | 6,064 | 100.00% |

Democratic primary
| Party | Candidate | Votes | % |
|---|---|---|---|
| Democratic | Delynn McCash | 834 | 100.00% |
| Total votes | | 834 | 100.00% |

Tennessee House of Representatives District 17 General Election, 2020
| Party | Candidate | Votes | % |
|---|---|---|---|
| Republican | Andrew Farmer (incumbent) | 21,608 | 81.4% |
| Democratic | Delynn McCash | 4,935 | 18.6% |
| Total votes | | 26,543 | 100.00% |
| Republican hold | | | |

=== District 18 ===
Republican primary
| Party | Candidate | Votes | % |
|---|---|---|---|
| Republican | Eddie Mannis | 3,470 | 50.73% |
| Republican | Gina Oster | 3,371 | 49.27% |
| Total votes | | 6,841 | 100.00% |

Democratic primary
| Party | Candidate | Votes | % |
|---|---|---|---|
| Democratic | Virginia Couch | 3,892 | 100.00% |
| Total votes | | 3,892 | 100.00% |

Tennessee House of Representatives District 18 General Election, 2020
| Party | Candidate | Votes | % |
|---|---|---|---|
| Republican | Eddie Mannis | 17,400 | 54.81% |
| Democratic | Virginia Couch | 14,350 | 45.19% |
| Total votes | | 31,750 | 100.00% |
| Republican hold | | | |

=== District 19 ===
Republican primary
| Party | Candidate | Votes | % |
|---|---|---|---|
| Republican | Dave Wright (incumbent) | 6,660 | 100% |
| Total votes | | 6,660 | 100% |

Democratic primary
| Party | Candidate | Votes | % |
|---|---|---|---|
| Democratic | No candidate qualified | 0 | |
| Total votes | | 0 | |

Tennessee House of Representatives District 19 General Election, 2020
| Party | Candidate | Votes | % |
|---|---|---|---|
| Republican | Dave Wright (incumbent) | 24,350 | 100% |
| Total votes | | 24,350 | 100% |
| Republican hold | | | |

=== District 20 ===
Republican primary
| Party | Candidate | Votes | % |
|---|---|---|---|
| Republican | Bob Ramsey (incumbent) | 4,879 | |
| Republican | Bryan Richey | 2,275 | |
| Total votes | | 7,154 | 100% |

Democratic primary
| Party | Candidate | Votes | % |
|---|---|---|---|
| Democratic | Susan Sneed | 2,118 | 100% |
| Total votes | | 2,118 | 100% |

Tennessee House of Representatives District 20 General Election, 2020
| Party | Candidate | Votes | % |
|---|---|---|---|
| Republican | Bob Ramsey (incumbent) | 23,650 | 73% |
| Democratic | Susan Sneed | 8,806 | 27% |
| Total votes | | 32,456 | 100% |
| Republican hold | | | |

=== District 21 ===
Republican primary
| Party | Candidate | Votes | % |
|---|---|---|---|
| Republican | Lowell Russell (incumbent) | 9,868 | 100% |
| Total votes | | 9,868 | 100% |

Democratic primary
| Party | Candidate | Votes | % |
|---|---|---|---|
| Democratic | No candidate qualified | 0 | |
| Total votes | | 0 | |

Tennessee House of Representatives District 21 General Election, 2020
| Party | Candidate | Votes | % |
|---|---|---|---|
| Republican | Lowell Russell (incumbent) | 29,224 | 100% |
| Total votes | | 29,224 | 100% |
| Republican hold | | | |

=== District 22 ===
Republican primary
| Party | Candidate | Votes | % |
|---|---|---|---|
| Republican | Dan Howell (incumbent) | 7,908 | 100% |
| Total votes | | 7,908 | 100% |

Democratic primary
| Party | Candidate | Votes | % |
|---|---|---|---|
| Democratic | No candidate qualified | 0 | |
| Total votes | | 0 | |

Tennessee House of Representatives District 22 General Election, 2020
| Party | Candidate | Votes | % |
|---|---|---|---|
| Republican | Dan Howell (incumbent) | 24,646 | 100% |
| Total votes | | 24,646 | 100% |
| Republican hold | | | |

=== District 23 ===
Republican primary
| Party | Candidate | Votes | % |
|---|---|---|---|
| Republican | Mark Cochran (incumbent) | 7,507 | 100% |
| Total votes | | 7,507 | 100% |

Democratic primary
| Party | Candidate | Votes | % |
|---|---|---|---|
| Democratic | No candidate qualified | 0 | |
| Total votes | | 0 | |

Tennessee House of Representatives District 23 General Election, 2020
| Party | Candidate | Votes | % |
|---|---|---|---|
| Republican | Mark Cochran (incumbent) | 24,290 | 87% |
| Independent | David G.E. Fankhauser | 3,711 | 13% |
| Total votes | | 28,001 | 100% |
| Republican hold | | | |

=== District 24 ===
Republican primary
| Party | Candidate | Votes | % |
|---|---|---|---|
| Republican | Mark Hall (incumbent) | 6,287 | 100% |
| Total votes | | 6,287 | 100% |

Democratic primary
| Party | Candidate | Votes | % |
|---|---|---|---|
| Democratic | Daniel Jones | 1,360 | 100% |
| Total votes | | 1,360 | 100% |

Tennessee House of Representatives District 24 General Election, 2020
| Party | Candidate | Votes | % |
|---|---|---|---|
| Republican | Mark Hall (incumbent) | 19,249 | 76% |
| Democratic | Daniel Jones | 5,960 | 24% |
| Total votes | | 25,209 | 100% |
| Republican hold | | | |

=== District 25 ===
Republican primary
| Party | Candidate | Votes | % |
|---|---|---|---|
| Republican | Cameron Sexton (incumbent) | 9,977 | 100% |
| Total votes | | 9,977 | 100% |

Democratic primary
| Party | Candidate | Votes | % |
|---|---|---|---|
| Democratic | Robyn Deck | 1,747 | 100% |
| Total votes | | 1,747 | 100% |

Tennessee House of Representatives District 25 General Election, 2020
| Party | Candidate | Votes | % |
|---|---|---|---|
| Republican | Cameron Sexton (incumbent) | 27,778 | 81.63% |
| Democratic | Robyn Deck | 6,250 | 18.37% |
| Total votes | | 34,028 | 100.00% |
| Republican hold | | | |

=== District 26 ===
Republican primary
| Party | Candidate | Votes | % |
|---|---|---|---|
| Republican | Robin T. Smith (incumbent) | 8,017 | 100% |
| Total votes | | 8,017 | 100% |

Democratic primary
| Party | Candidate | Votes | % |
|---|---|---|---|
| Democratic | Joan Farrell | 3,683 | 100% |
| Total votes | | 3,683 | 100% |

Tennessee House of Representatives District 26 General Election, 2020
| Party | Candidate | Votes | % |
|---|---|---|---|
| Republican | Robin T. Smith (incumbent) | 24,396 | 65% |
| Democratic | Joan Farrell | 13,311 | 35% |
| Total votes | | 37,707 | 100% |
| Republican hold | | | |

=== District 27 ===
Republican primary
| Party | Candidate | Votes | % |
|---|---|---|---|
| Republican | Patsy Hazlewood (incumbent) | 8,650 | 100% |
| Total votes | | 8,650 | 100% |

Democratic primary
| Party | Candidate | Votes | % |
|---|---|---|---|
| Democratic | No candidate qualified | 0 | |
| Total votes | | 0 | |

Tennessee House of Representatives District 27 General Election, 2020
| Party | Candidate | Votes | % |
|---|---|---|---|
| Republican | Patsy Hazlewood (incumbent) | 26,988 | 100% |
| Total votes | | 26,988 | 100% |
| Republican hold | | | |

=== District 28 ===
Republican primary
| Party | Candidate | Votes | % |
|---|---|---|---|
| Republican | No candidate qualified | 0 | |
| Total votes | | 0 | |

Democratic primary
| Party | Candidate | Votes | % |
|---|---|---|---|
| Democratic | Yusuf Hakeem (incumbent) | 6,871 | 100% |
| Total votes | | 6,871 | 100% |

Tennessee House of Representatives District 28 General Election, 2020
| Party | Candidate | Votes | % |
|---|---|---|---|
| Democratic | Yusuf Hakeem (incumbent) | 21,062 | 100% |
| Total votes | | 21,062 | 100% |
| Democratic hold | | | |

=== District 29 ===
Republican primary
| Party | Candidate | Votes | % |
|---|---|---|---|
| Republican | Mike Carter (incumbent) | 7,694 | 100% |
| Total votes | | 7,694 | 100% |

Democratic primary
| Party | Candidate | Votes | % |
|---|---|---|---|
| Democratic | No candidate qualified | 0 | |
| Total votes | | 0 | |

Tennessee House of Representatives District 29 General Election, 2020
| Party | Candidate | Votes | % |
|---|---|---|---|
| Republican | Mike Carter (incumbent) | 28,261 | 100% |
| Total votes | | 28,261 | 100% |
| Republican hold | | | |

=== District 30 ===
Republican primary
| Party | Candidate | Votes | % |
|---|---|---|---|
| Republican | Esther Helton (incumbent) | 5,765 | 100% |
| Total votes | | 5,765 | 100% |

Democratic primary
| Party | Candidate | Votes | % |
|---|---|---|---|
| Democratic | Joseph Udeaja | 2,953 | 100% |
| Total votes | | 2,953 | 100% |

Tennessee House of Representatives District 30 General Election, 2020
| Party | Candidate | Votes | % |
|---|---|---|---|
| Republican | Esther Helton (incumbent) | 19,146 | 62% |
| Democratic | Joseph Udeaja | 11,907 | 38% |
| Total votes | | 31,053 | 100% |
| Republican hold | | | |

=== District 31 ===
Republican primary
| Party | Candidate | Votes | % |
|---|---|---|---|
| Republican | Ron Travis (incumbent) | 6,969 | 100% |
| Total votes | | 6,969 | 100% |

Democratic primary
| Party | Candidate | Votes | % |
|---|---|---|---|
| Democratic | Dean Sparks | 1,281 | 100% |
| Total votes | | 1,281 | 100% |

Tennessee House of Representatives District 31 General Election, 2020
| Party | Candidate | Votes | % |
|---|---|---|---|
| Republican | Ron Travis (incumbent) | 23,293 | 83% |
| Democratic | Dean Sparks | 4,779 | 17% |
| Total votes | | 28,072 | 100% |
| Republican hold | | | |

=== District 32 ===
Republican primary
| Party | Candidate | Votes | % |
|---|---|---|---|
| Republican | Kent Calfee (incumbent) | 6,035 | |
| Republican | Mike Hooks | 3,170 | |
| Total votes | | 9,205 | 100% |

Democratic primary
| Party | Candidate | Votes | % |
|---|---|---|---|
| Democratic | No candidate qualified | 0 | |
| Total votes | | 0 | |

Tennessee House of Representatives District 32 General Election, 2020
| Party | Candidate | Votes | % |
|---|---|---|---|
| Republican | Kent Calfee (incumbent) | 25,647 | 100% |
| Total votes | | 25,647 | 100% |
| Republican hold | | | |

=== District 33 ===
Republican primary
| Party | Candidate | Votes | % |
|---|---|---|---|
| Republican | John D. Ragan (incumbent) | 5,565 | 100% |
| Total votes | | 5,565 | 100% |

Democratic primary
| Party | Candidate | Votes | % |
|---|---|---|---|
| Democratic | Write-in: Madison Dittner | 183 | 100% |
| Total votes | | 183 | 100% |

Tennessee House of Representatives District 33 General Election, 2020
| Party | Candidate | Votes | % |
|---|---|---|---|
| Republican | John D. Ragan (incumbent) | 23,145 | 100% |
| Total votes | | 23,145 | 100% |
| Republican hold | | | |

=== District 34 ===
Republican primary
| Party | Candidate | Votes | % |
|---|---|---|---|
| Republican | Tim Rudd (incumbent) | 6,634 | 100% |
| Total votes | | 6,634 | 100% |

Democratic primary
| Party | Candidate | Votes | % |
|---|---|---|---|
| Democratic | Mary R. Vaughn | 3,918 | 100% |
| Total votes | | 3,918 | 100% |

Tennessee House of Representatives District 34 General Election, 2020
| Party | Candidate | Votes | % |
|---|---|---|---|
| Republican | Tim Rudd (incumbent) | 26,284 | 62% |
| Democratic | Mary R. Vaughn | 16,381 | 38% |
| Total votes | | 42,665 | 100% |
| Republican hold | | | |

=== District 35 ===
Republican primary
| Party | Candidate | Votes | % |
|---|---|---|---|
| Republican | Jerry Sexton (incumbent) | 7,112 | 100% |
| Total votes | | 7,112 | 100% |

Democratic primary
| Party | Candidate | Votes | % |
|---|---|---|---|
| Democratic | No candidate qualified | 0 | |
| Total votes | | 0 | |

Tennessee House of Representatives District 35 General Election, 2020
| Party | Candidate | Votes | % |
|---|---|---|---|
| Republican | Jerry Sexton (incumbent) | 20,824 | 100% |
| Total votes | | 20,824 | 100% |
| Republican hold | | | |

=== District 36 ===
Republican primary
| Party | Candidate | Votes | % |
|---|---|---|---|
| Republican | Dennis Powers (incumbent) | 4,877 | 100% |
| Total votes | | 4,877 | 100% |

Democratic primary
| Party | Candidate | Votes | % |
|---|---|---|---|
| Democratic | CJ Mitchell | 905 | 100% |
| Total votes | | 905 | 100% |

Tennessee House of Representatives District 36 General Election, 2020
| Party | Candidate | Votes | % |
|---|---|---|---|
| Republican | Dennis Powers (incumbent) | 19,044 | 83% |
| Democratic | CJ Mitchell | 4,053 | 18% |
| Total votes | | 23,097 | 100% |
| Republican hold | | | |

=== District 37 ===
Republican primary
| Party | Candidate | Votes | % |
|---|---|---|---|
| Republican | Charlie Baum (incumbent) | 5,110 | 100% |
| Total votes | | 5,110 | 100% |

Democratic primary
| Party | Candidate | Votes | % |
|---|---|---|---|
| Democratic | Mariah N. Phillips | 3,454 | 100% |
| Total votes | | 3,454 | 100% |

Tennessee House of Representatives District 37 General Election, 2020
| Party | Candidate | Votes | % |
|---|---|---|---|
| Republican | Charlie Baum (incumbent) | 17,372 | 58% |
| Democratic | Mariah N. Phillips | 12,509 | 42% |
| Total votes | | 29,881 | 100% |
| Republican hold | | | |

=== District 38 ===
Republican primary
| Party | Candidate | Votes | % |
|---|---|---|---|
| Republican | Kelly T Keisling | 6,726 | 100.00% |
| Total votes | | 6,726 | 100.00% |

Democratic primary
| Party | Candidate | Votes | % |
|---|---|---|---|
| Democratic | Carol Abney | 836 | 100.00% |
| Total votes | | 836 | 100.00% |

Tennessee House of Representatives District 38 General Election, 2020
| Party | Candidate | Votes | % |
|---|---|---|---|
| Republican | Kelly T Keisling | 22,177 | 86% |
| Democratic | Carol Abney | 3,724 | 14% |
| Total votes | | 25,901 | 100.00% |
| Republican hold | | | |

=== District 39 ===
Republican primary
| Party | Candidate | Votes | % |
|---|---|---|---|
| Republican | Iris Rudder (incumbent) | 7,021 | 100% |
| Total votes | | 7,021 | 100% |

Democratic primary
| Party | Candidate | Votes | % |
|---|---|---|---|
| Democratic | No candidate qualified | 0 | |
| Total votes | | 0 | |

Tennessee House of Representatives District 39 General Election, 2020
| Party | Candidate | Votes | % |
|---|---|---|---|
| Republican | Iris Rudder (incumbent) | 21,737 | 100% |
| Total votes | | 21,737 | 100% |
| Republican hold | | | |

=== District 40 ===
Republican primary
| Party | Candidate | Votes | % |
|---|---|---|---|
| Republican | Terri Lynn Weaver (incumbent) | 9,370 | 100% |
| Total votes | | 9,370 | 100% |

Democratic primary
| Party | Candidate | Votes | % |
|---|---|---|---|
| Democratic | No candidate qualified | 0 | |
| Total votes | | 0 | |

Tennessee House of Representatives District 40 General Election, 2020
| Party | Candidate | Votes | % |
|---|---|---|---|
| Republican | Terri Lynn Weaver (incumbent) | 25,986 | 79% |
| Independent | Paddy Sizemore | 6,991 | 21% |
| Total votes | | 32,977 | 100% |
| Republican hold | | | |

=== District 41 ===
Democratic primary
| Party | Candidate | Votes | % |
|---|---|---|---|
| Democratic | John Windle (incumbent) | 1,719 | 100.00% |
| Total votes | | 1,719 | 100.00% |

Tennessee House of Representatives District 41 General Election, 2020
| Party | Candidate | Votes | % |
|---|---|---|---|
| Democratic | John Windle (incumbent) | 17,396 | 100.00% |
| Total votes | | 17,396 | 100.00% |
| Democratic hold | | | |

=== District 42 ===
Republican primary
| Party | Candidate | Votes | % |
|---|---|---|---|
| Republican | Ryan Williams | 5,778 | |
| Republican | Dennis C Bynum | 2,489 | |
| Total votes | | 8,267 | 100.00% |

Democratic primary
| Party | Candidate | Votes | % |
|---|---|---|---|
| Democratic | No Candidate Qualified | 0 | 100.00% |
| Total votes | | 0 | 100.00% |

Tennessee House of Representatives District 42 General Election, 2020
| Party | Candidate | Votes | % |
|---|---|---|---|
| Republican | Ryan Williams | 20,591 | |
| Total votes | | 20,591 | 100.00% |
| Republican hold | | | |

=== District 43 ===
Republican primary
| Party | Candidate | Votes | % |
|---|---|---|---|
| Republican | Jerry Lowery | 2,190 | 26.98% |
| Republican | Bobby Robinson | 2,053 | 25.29% |
| Republican | Paul Sherrell | 3,874 | 47.73% |
| Total votes | | 8,117 | 100.00% |

Democratic primary
| Party | Candidate | Votes | % |
|---|---|---|---|
| Democratic | No Candidate Qualified | 0 | 100.00% |
| Total votes | | 0 | 100.00% |

Tennessee House of Representatives District 43 General Election, 2020
| Party | Candidate | Votes | % |
|---|---|---|---|
| Republican | Paul Sherrell | 20,091 | 80% |
| Independent | Luke Cameron | 5,112 | 20% |
| Total votes | | 25,203 | 100.00% |
| Republican hold | | | |

=== District 44 ===
Republican primary
| Party | Candidate | Votes | % |
|---|---|---|---|
| Republican | William Lamberth | 5,981 | 100.00% |
| Total votes | | 5,981 | 100.00% |

Democratic primary
| Party | Candidate | Votes | % |
|---|---|---|---|
| Democratic | No Candidate Qualified | 0 | 100.00% |
| Total votes | | 0 | 100.00% |

Tennessee House of Representatives District 44 General Election, 2020
| Party | Candidate | Votes | % |
|---|---|---|---|
| Republican | William Lamberth | 27,015 | |
| Total votes | | 27,015 | 100.00% |
| Republican hold | | | |

=== District 45 ===
Republican primary
| Party | Candidate | Votes | % |
|---|---|---|---|
| Republican | Johnny Garrett | 7,191 | 100.00% |
| Total votes | | 7,191 | 100.00% |

Democratic primary
| Party | Candidate | Votes | % |
|---|---|---|---|
| Democratic | No Candidate Qualified | 0 | 100.00% |
| Total votes | | 0 | 100.00% |

Tennessee House of Representatives District 45 General Election, 2020
| Party | Candidate | Votes | % |
|---|---|---|---|
| Republican | Johnny Garrett | 29,487 | |
| Total votes | | 29,487 | 100.00% |
| Republican hold | | | |

=== District 46 ===
Republican primary
| Party | Candidate | Votes | % |
|---|---|---|---|
| Republican | Clark Boyd | 8,259 | 100.00% |
| Total votes | | 8,259 | 100.00% |

Democratic primary
| Party | Candidate | Votes | % |
|---|---|---|---|
| Democratic | No Candidate Qualified | 786 | 100.00% |
| Total votes | | 786 | 100.00% |

Tennessee House of Representatives District 46 General Election, 2020
| Party | Candidate | Votes | % |
|---|---|---|---|
| Republican | Clark Boyd | 28,219 | |
| Total votes | | 28,219 | 100.00% |
| Republican hold | | | |

=== District 47 ===
Republican primary
| Party | Candidate | Votes | % |
|---|---|---|---|
| Republican | Rush Bricken | 5,515 | |
| Republican | Ronnie E. Holden | 2,658 | |
| Total votes | | 8,173 | 100.00% |

Democratic primary
| Party | Candidate | Votes | % |
|---|---|---|---|
| Democratic | No Candidate Qualified | 0 | 100.00% |
| Total votes | | 0 | 100.00% |

Tennessee House of Representatives District 47 General Election, 2020
| Party | Candidate | Votes | % |
|---|---|---|---|
| Republican | Rush Bricken | 23,938 | |
| Total votes | | 23,938 | 100.00% |
| Republican hold | | | |

=== District 48 ===
Republican primary
| Party | Candidate | Votes | % |
|---|---|---|---|
| Republican | Bryan Terry | 6,484 | 100.00% |
| Total votes | | 6,484 | 100.00% |

Democratic primary
| Party | Candidate | Votes | % |
|---|---|---|---|
| Democratic | Matt Ferry | 3,115 | 100.00% |
| Total votes | | 3,115 | 100.00% |

Tennessee House of Representatives District 48 General Election, 2020
| Party | Candidate | Votes | % |
|---|---|---|---|
| Republican | Bryan Terry | 19,724 | 62% |
| Democratic | Matt Ferry | 12,236 | 38% |
| Total votes | | 31,960 | 100.00% |
| Republican hold | | | |

=== District 49 ===
Republican primary
| Party | Candidate | Votes | % |
|---|---|---|---|
| Republican | Mike Sparks | 3,653 | 100.00% |
| Total votes | | 3,653 | 100.00% |

Democratic primary
| Party | Candidate | Votes | % |
|---|---|---|---|
| Democratic | Brandon Thomas | 2,968 | 100.00% |
| Total votes | | 2,968 | 100.00% |

Tennessee House of Representatives District 49 General Election, 2020
| Party | Candidate | Votes | % |
|---|---|---|---|
| Republican | Mike Sparks | 15,375 | 54% |
| Democratic | Brandon Thomas | 13,167 | 46% |
| Total votes | | 28,542 | 100.00% |
| Republican hold | | | |

=== District 50 ===
Republican primary
| Party | Candidate | Votes | % |
|---|---|---|---|
| Republican | No Candidate Qualified | 0 | 100.00% |
| Total votes | | 0 | 100.00% |

Democratic primary
| Party | Candidate | Votes | % |
|---|---|---|---|
| Democratic | Bo Mitchell | 7,493 | 100.00% |
| Total votes | | 7,493 | 100.00% |

Tennessee House of Representatives District 50 General Election, 2020
| Party | Candidate | Votes | % |
|---|---|---|---|
| Democratic | Bo Mitchell | 23,658 | |
| Total votes | | 23,658 | 100.00% |
| Democratic hold | | | |

=== District 51 ===
Republican primary
| Party | Candidate | Votes | % |
|---|---|---|---|
| Republican | No Candidate Qualified | 0 | 100.00% |
| Total votes | | 0 | 100.00% |

Democratic primary
| Party | Candidate | Votes | % |
|---|---|---|---|
| Democratic | Bill Beck | 9,910 | 100.00% |
| Total votes | | 9,910 | 100.00% |

Tennessee House of Representatives District 51 General Election, 2020
| Party | Candidate | Votes | % |
|---|---|---|---|
| Democratic | Bill Beck | 27,212 | |
| Total votes | | 27,212 | 100.00% |
| Democratic hold | | | |

=== District 52 ===
Republican primary
| Party | Candidate | Votes | % |
|---|---|---|---|
| Republican | Donna Tees | 1,226 | 100.00% |
| Total votes | | 1,226 | 100.00% |

Democratic primary
| Party | Candidate | Votes | % |
|---|---|---|---|
| Democratic | Mike Stewart | 2,634 | |
| Democratic | James C. Turner II | 4,327 | |
| Total votes | | 6,961 | 100.00% |

Tennessee House of Representatives District 52 General Election, 2020
| Party | Candidate | Votes | % |
|---|---|---|---|
| Democratic | Mike Stewart | 16,421 | 72% |
| Republican | Donna Tees | 6,382 | 28% |
| Total votes | | 22,803 | 100.00% |
| Democratic hold | | | |

=== District 53 ===
Republican primary
| Party | Candidate | Votes | % |
|---|---|---|---|
| Republican | No Candidate Qualified | 0 | 100.00% |
| Total votes | | 0 | 100.00% |

Democratic primary
| Party | Candidate | Votes | % |
|---|---|---|---|
| Democratic | Jason L. Powell | 6,075 | 100.00% |
| Total votes | | 6,075 | 100.00% |

Tennessee House of Representatives District 53 General Election, 2020
| Party | Candidate | Votes | % |
|---|---|---|---|
| Democratic | Jason L. Powell | 20,075 | |
| Total votes | | 20,075 | 100.00% |
| Democratic hold | | | |

=== District 54 ===
Republican primary
| Party | Candidate | Votes | % |
|---|---|---|---|
| Republican | No Candidate Qualified | 0 | 100.00% |
| Total votes | | 0 | 100.00% |

Democratic primary
| Party | Candidate | Votes | % |
|---|---|---|---|
| Democratic | Vincent Dixie | 4,772 | |
| Democratic | Terry Clayton | 7,060 | |
| Total votes | | 11,832 | 100.00% |

Tennessee House of Representatives District 54 General Election, 2020
| Party | Candidate | Votes | % |
|---|---|---|---|
| Democratic | Vincent Dixie | 24,619 | |
| Total votes | | 24,619 | 100.00% |
| Democratic hold | | | |

=== District 55 ===
Republican primary
| Party | Candidate | Votes | % |
|---|---|---|---|
| Republican | No Candidate Qualified | 0 | 100.00% |
| Total votes | | 0 | 100.00% |

Democratic primary
| Party | Candidate | Votes | % |
|---|---|---|---|
| Democratic | John Ray Clemmons | 8,994 | 100.00% |
| Total votes | | 8,994 | 100.00% |

Tennessee House of Representatives District 55 General Election, 2020
| Party | Candidate | Votes | % |
|---|---|---|---|
| Democratic | John Ray Clemmons | 25,707 | |
| Total votes | | 25,707 | 100.00% |
| Democratic hold | | | |

=== District 56 ===
Republican primary
| Party | Candidate | Votes | % |
|---|---|---|---|
| Republican | Diane Michel Canada | 5,918 | 100.00% |
| Total votes | | 5,918 | 100.00% |

Democratic primary
| Party | Candidate | Votes | % |
|---|---|---|---|
| Democratic | Bob Freeman | 9,592 | 100.00% |
| Total votes | | 9,592 | 100.00% |

Tennessee House of Representatives District 56 General Election, 2020
| Party | Candidate | Votes | % |
|---|---|---|---|
| Democratic | Bob Freeman | 22,321 | 54% |
| Republican | Diane Michel Canada | 18,891 | 46% |
| Total votes | | 41,212 | 100.00% |
| Democratic hold | | | |

=== District 57 ===
Republican primary
| Party | Candidate | Votes | % |
|---|---|---|---|
| Republican | Susan M Lynn | 10,543 | 100.00% |
| Total votes | | 10,543 | 100.00% |

Democratic primary
| Party | Candidate | Votes | % |
|---|---|---|---|
| Democratic | No Candidate Qualified | 1,793 | 100.00% |
| Total votes | | 1,793 | 100.00% |

Tennessee House of Representatives District 57 General Election, 2020
| Party | Candidate | Votes | % |
|---|---|---|---|
| Republican | Susan M Lynn | 31,239 | 69% |
| Independent | Tom Sottek | 13,727 | 31% |
| Total votes | | 44,966 | 100.00% |
| Republican hold | | | |

=== District 58 ===
Republican primary
| Party | Candidate | Votes | % |
|---|---|---|---|
| Republican | No Candidate Qualified | 0 | 100.00% |
| Total votes | | 0 | 100.00% |

Democratic primary
| Party | Candidate | Votes | % |
|---|---|---|---|
| Democratic | Harold M. Love | 8,203 | 100.00% |
| Total votes | | 8,203 | 100.00% |

Tennessee House of Representatives District 58 General Election, 2020
| Party | Candidate | Votes | % |
|---|---|---|---|
| Democratic | Harold M. Love | 23,839 | |
| Total votes | | 23,839 | 100.00% |
| Democratic hold | | | |

=== District 59 ===
Republican primary
| Party | Candidate | Votes | % |
|---|---|---|---|
| Republican | No Candidate Qualified | 0 | 100.00% |
| Total votes | | 0 | 100.00% |

Democratic primary
| Party | Candidate | Votes | % |
|---|---|---|---|
| Democratic | Jason Potts | 4,698 | 100.00% |
| Total votes | | 4,698 | 100.00% |

Tennessee House of Representatives District 59 General Election, 2020
| Party | Candidate | Votes | % |
|---|---|---|---|
| Democratic | Jason Potts | 15,418 | |
| Total votes | | 15,418 | 100.00% |
| Democratic hold | | | |

=== District 60 ===
Republican primary
| Party | Candidate | Votes | % |
|---|---|---|---|
| Republican | No Candidate Qualified | 0 | 100.00% |
| Total votes | | 0 | 100.00% |

Democratic primary
| Party | Candidate | Votes | % |
|---|---|---|---|
| Democratic | Darren Jernigan | 2,136 | |
| Democratic | Grant Thomas Medeiros | 5,241 | |
| Total votes | | 7,377 | 100.00% |

Tennessee House of Representatives District 60 General Election, 2020
| Party | Candidate | Votes | % |
|---|---|---|---|
| Democratic | Darren Jernigan | 23,220 | |
| Total votes | | 23,220 | 100.00% |
| Democratic hold | | | |

=== District 61 ===
Republican primary
| Party | Candidate | Votes | % |
|---|---|---|---|
| Republican | Brandon Ogles (incumbent) | 8,180 | 100.00% |
| Total votes | | 8,180 | 100.00% |

Democratic primary
| Party | Candidate | Votes | % |
|---|---|---|---|
| Democratic | Sam Bledsoe | 3,203 | 100.00% |
| Total votes | | 3,203 | 100.00% |

Tennessee House of Representatives District 61 General Election, 2020
| Party | Candidate | Votes | % |
|---|---|---|---|
| Republican | Brandon Ogles (incumbent) | 27,440 | 65.9% |
| Democratic | Sam Bledsoe | 14,178 | 34.1% |
| Total votes | | 41,618 | 100.00% |
| Republican hold | | | |

=== District 62 ===
Republican primary
| Party | Candidate | Votes | % |
|---|---|---|---|
| Republican | Pat Marsh (incumbent) | 6,277 | 100.00% |
| Total votes | | 6,277 | 100.00% |

Democratic primary
| Party | Candidate | Votes | % |
|---|---|---|---|
| Democratic | Write-In – Tre Stewart | 194 | 100.00% |
| Total votes | | 194 | 100.00% |

Tennessee House of Representatives District 62 General Election, 2020
| Party | Candidate | Votes | % |
|---|---|---|---|
| Republican | Pat Marsh | 21,399 | 99.10% |
| Democratic | Write-In – Tre Stewart | 194 | 0.90% |
| Total votes | | 21,593 | 100.00% |
| Republican hold | | | |

=== District 63 ===
Republican primary
| Party | Candidate | Votes | % |
|---|---|---|---|
| Republican | Glen Casada (incumbent) | 8,633 | 100.00% |
| Total votes | | 8,633 | 100.00% |

Democratic primary
| Party | Candidate | Votes | % |
|---|---|---|---|
| Democratic | Elizabeth Madeira | 3,994 | 100.00% |
| Total votes | | 3,994 | 100.00% |

Tennessee House of Representatives District 63 General Election, 2020
| Party | Candidate | Votes | % |
|---|---|---|---|
| Republican | Glen Casada | 33,360 | 59.63% |
| Democratic | Elizabeth Madeira | 18,088 | 32.34% |
| Independent | Bradley Fiscus | 4,494 | 8.03% |
| Total votes | | 55,942 | 100.00% |
| Republican hold | | | |

=== District 64 ===
Republican primary
| Party | Candidate | Votes | % |
|---|---|---|---|
| Republican | Scott Cepicky (incumbent) | 7,771 | 100.00% |
| Total votes | | 7,771 | 100.00% |

Democratic primary
| Party | Candidate | Votes | % |
|---|---|---|---|
| Democratic | James Campbell | 2,125 | 100.00% |
| Total votes | | 2,125 | 100.00% |

Tennessee House of Representatives District 64 General Election, 2020
| Party | Candidate | Votes | % |
|---|---|---|---|
| Republican | Scott Cepicky | 26,003 | 71.12% |
| Democratic | James Campbell | 10,561 | 28.88% |
| Total votes | | 36,564 | 100.00% |
| Republican hold | | | |

=== District 65 ===
Republican primary
| Party | Candidate | Votes | % |
|---|---|---|---|
| Republican | Sam Whitson (incumbent) | 6,873 | 100.00% |
| Total votes | | 6,873 | 100.00% |

Democratic primary
| Party | Candidate | Votes | % |
|---|---|---|---|
| Democratic | Jennifer Foley | 2,664 | 100.00% |
| Total votes | | 2,664 | 100.00% |

Tennessee House of Representatives District 65 General Election, 2020
| Party | Candidate | Votes | % |
|---|---|---|---|
| Republican | Sam Whitson | 26,616 | 68.06% |
| Democratic | Jennifer Foley | 12,488 | 31.94% |
| Total votes | | 39,104 | 100.00% |
| Republican hold | | | |

=== District 66 ===
Republican primary
| Party | Candidate | Votes | % |
|---|---|---|---|
| Republican | Sabi Kumar (incumbent) | 6,670 | 100.00% |
| Total votes | | 6,670 | 100.00% |

Democratic primary
| Party | Candidate | Votes | % |
|---|---|---|---|
| Democratic | Jarvus M. Turnley | 1,783 | 100.00% |
| Total votes | | 1,783 | 100.00% |

Tennessee House of Representatives District 66 General Election, 2020
| Party | Candidate | Votes | % |
|---|---|---|---|
| Republican | Sabi Kumar | 23,348 | 77.60% |
| Democratic | Jarvus M. Turnley | 6,740 | 22.40% |
| Total votes | | 30,088 | 100.00% |
| Republican hold | | | |

=== District 67 ===
Republican primary
| Party | Candidate | Votes | % |
|---|---|---|---|
| Republican | John W. Dawson | 2,429 | 100% |
| Total votes | | 2,429 | 100% |

Democratic primary
| Party | Candidate | Votes | % |
|---|---|---|---|
| Democratic | Jason Hodges | 2,593 | 100% |
| Total votes | | 2,593 | 100% |

Tennessee House of Representatives District 67 General Election, 2020
| Party | Candidate | Votes | % |
|---|---|---|---|
| Democratic | Jason Hodges | 12,841 | 55% |
| Republican | John W. Dawson | 10,538 | 45% |
| Total votes | | 23,379 | 100% |
| Democratic hold | | | |

=== District 68 ===
Republican primary
| Party | Candidate | Votes | % |
|---|---|---|---|
| Republican | Curtis Johnson | 7,409 | 100% |
| Total votes | | 7,409 | 100% |

Democratic primary
| Party | Candidate | Votes | % |
|---|---|---|---|
| Democratic | No Candidate Qualified | 0 | 100% |
| Total votes | | 0 | 100% |

Tennessee House of Representatives District 68 General Election, 2020
| Party | Candidate | Votes | % |
|---|---|---|---|
| Republican | Curtis Johnson | 28,351 | 100% |
| Total votes | | 28,351 | 100% |
| Republican hold | | | |

=== District 69 ===
Republican primary
| Party | Candidate | Votes | % |
|---|---|---|---|
| Republican | Michael G. Curcio | 5,136 | 100% |
| Total votes | | 5,136 | 100% |

Democratic primary
| Party | Candidate | Votes | % |
|---|---|---|---|
| Democratic | Eddie Johnson | 2,018 | 100% |
| Total votes | | 2,018 | 100% |

Tennessee House of Representatives District 69 General Election, 2020
| Party | Candidate | Votes | % |
|---|---|---|---|
| Republican | Michael G. Curcio | 18,804 | 70% |
| Democratic | Eddie Johnson | 7,954 | 30% |
| Total votes | | 26,758 | 100% |
| Republican hold | | | |

=== District 70 ===
Republican primary
| Party | Candidate | Votes | % |
|---|---|---|---|
| Republican | Clay Doggett | 7,001 | 100% |
| Total votes | | 7,001 | 100% |

Democratic primary
| Party | Candidate | Votes | % |
|---|---|---|---|
| Democratic | No Candidate Qualified | 0 | 100% |
| Total votes | | 0 | 100% |

Tennessee House of Representatives District 70 General Election, 2020
| Party | Candidate | Votes | % |
|---|---|---|---|
| Republican | Clay Doggett | 22,568 | 100% |
| Total votes | | 22,568 | 100% |
| Republican hold | | | |

=== District 71 ===
Republican primary
| Party | Candidate | Votes | % |
|---|---|---|---|
| Republican | David Byrd | 5,286 | 100% |
| Total votes | | 5,286 | 100% |

Democratic primary
| Party | Candidate | Votes | % |
|---|---|---|---|
| Democratic | No Candidate Qualified | 0 | 100% |
| Total votes | | 0 | 100% |

Tennessee House of Representatives District 71 General Election, 2020
| Party | Candidate | Votes | % |
|---|---|---|---|
| Republican | David Byrd | 21,427 | 100% |
| Total votes | | 21,427 | 100% |
| Republican hold | | | |

=== District 72 ===
Republican primary
| Party | Candidate | Votes | % |
|---|---|---|---|
| Republican | Kirk Haston | 3,065 | 30% |
| Republican | Gordon Wildridge | 7,014 | 70% |
| Total votes | | 10,079 | 100% |

Democratic primary
| Party | Candidate | Votes | % |
|---|---|---|---|
| Democratic | No Candidate Qualified | 0 | 100% |
| Total votes | | 0 | 100% |

Tennessee House of Representatives District 72 General Election, 2020
| Party | Candidate | Votes | % |
|---|---|---|---|
| Republican | Kirk Haston | 24,633 | 100% |
| Total votes | | 24,633 | 100% |
| Republican hold | | | |

=== District 73 ===
Republican primary
| Party | Candidate | Votes | % |
|---|---|---|---|
| Republican | Chris Todd | 6,539 | 100% |
| Total votes | | 6,539 | 100% |

Democratic primary
| Party | Candidate | Votes | % |
|---|---|---|---|
| Democratic | No Candidate Qualified | 0 | 100% |
| Total votes | | 0 | 100% |

Tennessee House of Representatives District 73 General Election, 2020
| Party | Candidate | Votes | % |
|---|---|---|---|
| Republican | Chris Todd | 25,093 | 100% |
| Total votes | | 25,093 | 100% |
| Republican hold | | | |

=== District 74 ===
Republican primary
| Party | Candidate | Votes | % |
|---|---|---|---|
| Republican | Jay Reedy | 4,478 | 100% |
| Total votes | | 4,478 | 100% |

Democratic primary
| Party | Candidate | Votes | % |
|---|---|---|---|
| Democratic | No Candidate Qualified | 0 | 100% |
| Total votes | | 0 | 100% |

Tennessee House of Representatives District 74 General Election, 2020
| Party | Candidate | Votes | % |
|---|---|---|---|
| Republican | Jay Reedy | 18,085 | 100% |
| Total votes | | 18,085 | 100% |
| Republican hold | | | |

=== District 75 ===
Republican primary
| Party | Candidate | Votes | % |
|---|---|---|---|
| Republican | Bruce Griffey | 7,154 | 100% |
| Total votes | | 7,154 | 100% |

Democratic primary
| Party | Candidate | Votes | % |
|---|---|---|---|
| Democratic | No Candidate Qualified | 0 | 100% |
| Total votes | | 0 | 100% |

Tennessee House of Representatives District 75 General Election, 2020
| Party | Candidate | Votes | % |
|---|---|---|---|
| Republican | Bruce Griffey | 20,140 | 81% |
| Independent | James Hart | 4,626 | 19% |
| Total votes | | 24,766 | 100% |
| Republican hold | | | |

=== District 76 ===
Republican primary
| Party | Candidate | Votes | % |
|---|---|---|---|
| Republican | Tandy Darby | 7,429 | 100% |
| Total votes | | 7,429 | 100% |

Democratic primary
| Party | Candidate | Votes | % |
|---|---|---|---|
| Democratic | No Candidate Qualified | 0 | 100% |
| Total votes | | 0 | 100% |

Tennessee House of Representatives District 76 General Election, 2020
| Party | Candidate | Votes | % |
|---|---|---|---|
| Republican | Tandy Darby | 16,948 | 76% |
| Independent | Jeffery T. Washburn | 5,365 | 24% |
| Total votes | | 22,313 | 100% |
| Republican hold | | | |

=== District 77 ===
Republican primary
| Party | Candidate | Votes | % |
|---|---|---|---|
| Republican | Rusty Grills | 5,959 | 100% |
| Total votes | | 5,959 | 100% |

Democratic primary
| Party | Candidate | Votes | % |
|---|---|---|---|
| Democratic | No Candidate Qualified | 0 | 100% |
| Total votes | | 0 | 100% |

Tennessee House of Representatives District 77 General Election, 2020
| Party | Candidate | Votes | % |
|---|---|---|---|
| Republican | Rusty Grills | 21,036 | 100% |
| Total votes | | 21,036 | 100% |
| Republican hold | | | |

=== District 78 ===
Republican primary
| Party | Candidate | Votes | % |
|---|---|---|---|
| Republican | Mary Littleton | 5,421 | 72% |
| Republican | James Ebb Gupton Jr. | 2,104 | 28% |
| Total votes | | 7,525 | 100% |

Democratic primary
| Party | Candidate | Votes | % |
|---|---|---|---|
| Democratic | Holly Spann | 2,782 | 100% |
| Total votes | | 2,782 | 100% |

Tennessee House of Representatives District 78 General Election, 2020
| Party | Candidate | Votes | % |
|---|---|---|---|
| Republican | Mary Littleton | 23,585 | 72.25% |
| Democratic | Holly Spann | 9,060 | 27.75% |
| Total votes | | 32,645 | 100.00% |
| Republican hold | | | |

=== District 79 ===
Republican primary
| Party | Candidate | Votes | % |
|---|---|---|---|
| Republican | Curtis Halford | 1,076 | 16.40% |
| Republican | Christine Warrington | 5,484 | 83.60% |
| Total votes | | 6,560 | 100.00% |

Democratic primary
| Party | Candidate | Votes | % |
|---|---|---|---|
| Democratic | No Candidate Qualified | 0 | 100% |
| Total votes | | 0 | 100% |

Tennessee House of Representatives District 79 General Election, 2020
| Party | Candidate | Votes | % |
|---|---|---|---|
| Republican | Curtis Halford | 21,862 | 100% |
| Total votes | | 21,869 | 100% |
| Republican hold | | | |

=== District 80 ===
Republican primary
| Party | Candidate | Votes | % |
|---|---|---|---|
| Republican | No Candidate Qualified | 0 | 100% |
| Total votes | | 0 | 100% |

Democratic primary
| Party | Candidate | Votes | % |
|---|---|---|---|
| Democratic | Johnny W. Shaw | 3,757 | 100% |
| Total votes | | 3,757 | 100% |

Tennessee House of Representatives District 80 General Election, 2020
| Party | Candidate | Votes | % |
|---|---|---|---|
| Democratic | Johnny W. Shaw | 15,395 | 100% |
| Total votes | | 15,395 | 100% |
| Democratic hold | | | |

=== District 81 ===
Republican primary
| Party | Candidate | Votes | % |
|---|---|---|---|
| Republican | Debra Moody | 5,606 | 100% |
| Total votes | | 5,606 | 100% |

Democratic primary
| Party | Candidate | Votes | % |
|---|---|---|---|
| Democratic | No Candidate Qualified | 0 | 100% |
| Total votes | | 0 | 100% |

Tennessee House of Representatives District 81 General Election, 2020
| Party | Candidate | Votes | % |
|---|---|---|---|
| Republican | Debra Moody | 19,897 | 100% |
| Total votes | | 19,897 | 100% |
| Republican hold | | | |

=== District 82 ===
Republican primary
| Party | Candidate | Votes | % |
|---|---|---|---|
| Republican | Chris Hurt | 4,310 | 100% |
| Total votes | | 4,310 | 100% |

Democratic primary
| Party | Candidate | Votes | % |
|---|---|---|---|
| Democratic | Andrea Bond-Johnson | 2,742 | 100% |
| Total votes | | 2,742 | 100% |

Tennessee House of Representatives District 82 General Election, 2020
| Party | Candidate | Votes | % |
|---|---|---|---|
| Republican | Chris Hurt | 12,432 | 59% |
| Democratic | Andrea Bond-Johnson | 8,684 | 41% |
| Total votes | | 21,116 | 100% |
| Republican hold | | | |

=== District 83 ===
Republican primary
| Party | Candidate | Votes | % |
|---|---|---|---|
| Republican | Mark White | 5,737 | 100% |
| Total votes | | 5,737 | 100% |

Democratic primary
| Party | Candidate | Votes | % |
|---|---|---|---|
| Democratic | Jerri Green | 4,401 | 100% |
| Total votes | | 4,401 | 100% |

Tennessee House of Representatives District 83 General Election, 2020
| Party | Candidate | Votes | % |
|---|---|---|---|
| Republican | Mark White | 17,738 | 54% |
| Democratic | Jerri Green | 15,136 | 46% |
| Total votes | | 32,874 | 100% |
| Republican hold | | | |

=== District 84 ===
Republican primary
| Party | Candidate | Votes | % |
|---|---|---|---|
| Republican | No Candidate Qualified | 0 | 100% |
| Total votes | | 0 | 100% |

Democratic primary
| Party | Candidate | Votes | % |
|---|---|---|---|
| Democratic | Joe Towns Jr. | 4,237 | 100% |
| Total votes | | 4,237 | 100% |

Tennessee House of Representatives District 84 General Election, 2020
| Party | Candidate | Votes | % |
|---|---|---|---|
| Democratic | Joe Towns Jr. | 16,974 | 100% |
| Total votes | | 16,974 | 100% |
| Democratic hold | | | |

=== District 85 ===
Republican primary
| Party | Candidate | Votes | % |
|---|---|---|---|
| Republican | No Candidate Qualified | 0 | 100% |
| Total votes | | 0 | 100% |

Democratic primary
| Party | Candidate | Votes | % |
|---|---|---|---|
| Democratic | Jesse Chism | 1,482 | 18% |
| Democratic | Alvin Crook | 6,744 | 82% |
| Total votes | | 8,226 | 100% |

Tennessee House of Representatives District 85 General Election, 2020
| Party | Candidate | Votes | % |
|---|---|---|---|
| Democratic | Jesse Chism | 20,050 | 100% |
| Total votes | | 20,050 | 100% |
| Democratic hold | | | |

=== District 86 ===
Republican primary
| Party | Candidate | Votes | % |
|---|---|---|---|
| Republican | Rob White | 1,433 | 100% |
| Total votes | | 1,433 | 100% |

Democratic primary
| Party | Candidate | Votes | % |
|---|---|---|---|
| Democratic | Barbara Cooper | 6,037 | 100% |
| Total votes | | 6,037 | 100% |

Tennessee House of Representatives District 86 General Election, 2020
| Party | Candidate | Votes | % |
|---|---|---|---|
| Democratic | Barbara Cooper | 15,803 | 73% |
| Republican | Rob White | 5,946 | 27% |
| Total votes | | 21,749 | 100% |
| Democratic hold | | | |

=== District 87 ===
Republican primary
| Party | Candidate | Votes | % |
|---|---|---|---|
| Republican | No Candidate Qualified | 0 | 100% |
| Total votes | | 0 | 100% |

Democratic primary
| Party | Candidate | Votes | % |
|---|---|---|---|
| Democratic | Karen Camper | 6,025 | 100% |
| Total votes | | 6,025 | 100% |

Tennessee House of Representatives District 87 General Election, 2020
| Party | Candidate | Votes | % |
|---|---|---|---|
| Democratic | Karen Camper | 15,915 | 100% |
| Total votes | | 15,915 | 100% |
| Democratic hold | | | |

=== District 88 ===
Republican primary
| Party | Candidate | Votes | % |
|---|---|---|---|
| Republican | No Candidate Qualified | 0 | 100% |
| Total votes | | 0 | 100% |

Democratic primary
| Party | Candidate | Votes | % |
|---|---|---|---|
| Democratic | Larry J. Miller | 982 | 100% |
| Total votes | | 982 | 100% |

Tennessee House of Representatives District 88 General Election, 2020
| Party | Candidate | Votes | % |
|---|---|---|---|
| Democratic | Larry J. Miller | 17,615 | 100% |
| Total votes | | 17,615 | 100% |
| Democratic hold | | | |

=== District 89 ===
Republican primary
| Party | Candidate | Votes | % |
|---|---|---|---|
| Republican | Justin Lafferty | 6,664 | 100% |
| Total votes | | 6,664 | 100% |

Democratic primary
| Party | Candidate | Votes | % |
|---|---|---|---|
| Democratic | No Candidate Qualified | 0 | 100% |
| Total votes | | 0 | 100% |

Tennessee House of Representatives District 89 General Election, 2020
| Party | Candidate | Votes | % |
|---|---|---|---|
| Republican | Justin Lafferty | 23,905 | 70% |
| Independent | Greg Mills | 9,426 | 28% |
| Write-In | Kari Keeling | 757 | 2% |
| Total votes | | 34,088 | 100% |
| Republican hold | | | |

=== District 90 ===
Republican primary
| Party | Candidate | Votes | % |
|---|---|---|---|
| Republican | No Candidate Qualified | 0 | 100% |
| Total votes | | 0 | 100% |

Democratic primary
| Party | Candidate | Votes | % |
|---|---|---|---|
| Democratic | Torrey Harris | 5,374 | 100% |
| Total votes | | 5,374 | 100% |

John DeBerry was removed from the ballot by his party for the August 2020 Democratic primaries because of his history of aligning with the Republicans in votes and donations, and ran in the general election as an independent.

Tennessee House of Representatives District 90 General Election, 2020
| Party | Candidate | Votes | % |
|---|---|---|---|
| Democratic | Torrey Harris | 15,996 | 77% |
| Independent | John DeBerry (Incumbent) | 4,689 | 23% |
| Total votes | | 20,685 | 100% |
| Democratic gain from Independent | | | |

=== District 91 ===
Republican primary
| Party | Candidate | Votes | % |
|---|---|---|---|
| Republican | No Candidate Qualified | 0 | 100% |
| Total votes | | 0 | 100% |

Democratic primary
| Party | Candidate | Votes | % |
|---|---|---|---|
| Democratic | London Lamar | 5,340 | 100% |
| Total votes | | 5,340 | 100% |

Tennessee House of Representatives District 91 General Election, 2020
| Party | Candidate | Votes | % |
|---|---|---|---|
| Democratic | London Lamar | 14,082 | 100% |
| Total votes | | 14,082 | 100% |
| Democratic hold | | | |

=== District 92 ===
Republican primary
| Party | Candidate | Votes | % |
|---|---|---|---|
| Republican | Todd Warner | 3,991 | 47.25% |
| Republican | Rick Tillis | 3,304 | 39.11% |
| Republican | Vincent A. Cuevas | 1,152 | 13.64% |
| Total votes | | 8,134 | 100.00% |

Democratic primary
| Party | Candidate | Votes | % |
|---|---|---|---|
| Democratic | No Candidate Qualified | 0 | 100% |
| Total votes | | 0 | 100% |

Tennessee House of Representatives District 92 General Election, 2020
| Party | Candidate | Votes | % |
|---|---|---|---|
| Republican | Todd Warner | 23,212 | 100% |
| Total votes | | 23,212 | 100% |
| Republican hold | | | |

=== District 93 ===
Republican primary
| Party | Candidate | Votes | % |
|---|---|---|---|
| Republican | No Candidate Qualified | 0 | 100% |
| Total votes | | 0 | 100% |

Democratic primary
| Party | Candidate | Votes | % |
|---|---|---|---|
| Democratic | G.A. Hardaway | 4,723 | 100% |
| Total votes | | 4,723 | 100% |

Tennessee House of Representatives District 93 General Election, 2020
| Party | Candidate | Votes | % |
|---|---|---|---|
| Democratic | G.A. Hardaway | 13,900 | 100% |
| Total votes | | 13,916 | 100% |
| Democratic hold | | | |

=== District 94 ===
Republican primary
| Party | Candidate | Votes | % |
|---|---|---|---|
| Republican | Ron M. Gant | 8,426 | 100% |
| Total votes | | 8,426 | 100% |

Democratic primary
| Party | Candidate | Votes | % |
|---|---|---|---|
| Democratic | No Candidate Qualified | 0 | 100% |
| Total votes | | 0 | 100% |

Tennessee House of Representatives District 94 General Election, 2020
| Party | Candidate | Votes | % |
|---|---|---|---|
| Republican | Ron M. Gant | 26,941 | 100% |
| Total votes | | 26,941 | 100% |
| Republican hold | | | |

=== District 95 ===
Republican primary
| Party | Candidate | Votes | % |
|---|---|---|---|
| Republican | William Kevin Vaughan | 7,900 | 100% |
| Total votes | | 7,900 | 100% |

Democratic primary
| Party | Candidate | Votes | % |
|---|---|---|---|
| Democratic | Lynnette P. Williams | 2,829 | 100% |
| Total votes | | 2,829 | 100% |

Tennessee House of Representatives District 95 General Election, 2020
| Party | Candidate | Votes | % |
|---|---|---|---|
| Republican | William Kevin Vaughan | 27,747 | 70% |
| Democratic | Lynnette P. Williams | 12,086 | 30% |
| Total votes | | 39,833 | 100% |
| Republican hold | | | |

=== District 96 ===
Republican primary
| Party | Candidate | Votes | % |
|---|---|---|---|
| Republican | Patricia "Patti" Possel | 4,093 | 100% |
| Total votes | | 4,093 | 100% |

Democratic primary
| Party | Candidate | Votes | % |
|---|---|---|---|
| Democratic | Dwayne Thompson | 6,039 | 100% |
| Total votes | | 6,039 | 100% |

Tennessee House of Representatives District 96 General Election, 2020
| Party | Candidate | Votes | % |
|---|---|---|---|
| Republican | Patricia "Patti" Possel | 13,491 | 41% |
| Democratic | Dwayne Thompson | 19,613 | 59% |
| Total votes | | 33,104 | 100% |
| Democratic hold | | | |

=== District 97 ===
Republican primary
| Party | Candidate | Votes | % |
|---|---|---|---|
| Republican | John Gillespie | 3,628 | 78.24% |
| Republican | Brandon S. Weise | 1,009 | 21.76% |
| Total votes | | 4,637 | 100.00% |

Democratic primary
| Party | Candidate | Votes | % |
|---|---|---|---|
| Democratic | Gabby Salinas | 14,246 | 100% |
| Total votes | | 14,246 | 100% |

Tennessee House of Representatives District 97 General Election, 2020
| Party | Candidate | Votes | % |
|---|---|---|---|
| Republican | John Gillespie | 14,712 | 50.80% |
| Democratic | Gabby Salinas | 14,246 | 49.20% |
| Total votes | | 28,958 | 100.00% |
| Republican hold | | | |

=== District 98 ===
Republican primary
| Party | Candidate | Votes | % |
|---|---|---|---|
| Republican | No Candidate Qualified | 0 | 100% |
| Total votes | | 0 | 100% |

Democratic primary
| Party | Candidate | Votes | % |
|---|---|---|---|
| Democratic | Antonio Parkinson | 722 | 100% |
| Total votes | | 722 | 100% |

Tennessee House of Representatives District 98 General Election, 2020
| Party | Candidate | Votes | % |
|---|---|---|---|
| Democratic | Antonio Parkinson | 14,670 | 100% |
| Total votes | | 14,670 | 100% |
| Democratic hold | | | |

=== District 99 ===
Republican primary
| Party | Candidate | Votes | % |
|---|---|---|---|
| Republican | Tom Leatherwood | 2,599 | 33% |
| Republican | Lee Mills | 5,243 | 67% |
| Total votes | | 7,842 | 100% |

Democratic primary
| Party | Candidate | Votes | % |
|---|---|---|---|
| Democratic | No Candidate Qualified | 0 | 100% |
| Total votes | | 0 | 100% |

Tennessee House of Representatives District 99 General Election, 2020
| Party | Candidate | Votes | % |
|---|---|---|---|
| Republican | Tom Leatherwood | 28,046 | 100% |
| Total votes | | 28,046 | 100% |
| Republican hold | | | |

== See also ==
- 2020 Tennessee elections
- 2020 Tennessee Senate election
