= Tennessee House of Representatives 15th district =

State legislative district in Tennessee

Tennessee's 15th State House of Representatives district
- Map of Tennessee House districts with the 15th District shaded in red
Representative
Sam McKenzie; D–Knoxville
since 2021
- Demographics: 61.5% White; 24.8% Black; 7.6% Hispanic; 1.3% Asian; 4.4% Multiracial
- Population (2024): 72,512

The Tennessee House of Representatives 15th district is one of the 99 legislative districts in the lower house of the Tennessee General Assembly. The district is located in East Tennessee and covers central Knox County. It is centered around inner Knoxville. It includes areas such as Mechanicsville, Fort Sanders, Lonsdale, South Knoxville, Vestal, Island Home, East Knoxville, Burlington, and Holston Hills. Sam McKenzie has represented the district since 2021.

== Demographics ==
The Tennessee Comptroller estimates the population as of 2024 at 72,512. Poverty rates are notably high at 31.6%, more than double the Tennessee-wide rate of 13.8%.

- 61.5% of the district is White
- 24.8% of the district is Black
- 7.6% of the district is Hispanic
- 1.3% of the district is Asian
- 4.4% of the district is Two or more races

Detailed demographic information is also available through Census Reporter.

== History ==
The 88th Tennessee General Assembly was the first in which all districts were numbered. The 15th district has been in Knox County since its creation.

== List of Representatives ==
Representative	Party	Years of Service	General Assembly	Hometown
Sam McKenzie	Democratic	2021 - present	112th-114th	Knoxville
Rick Staples	Democratic	2017-2020	110th-111th	Knoxville
Joe E. Armstrong	Democratic	1989-2014	96th-108th	Knoxville
Pete Drew	Republican	1983-1988	93rd-95th	Knoxville
Sharon Bell	Republican	1979-1982	91st-92nd	Knoxville
William B. Nolan	Democratic	1977-1978	90th	Knoxville
William S. Owen	Democratic	1975-1976	89th	Knoxville
John K. Mann	Republican	1973-1974	88th	Knoxville
