= Tennessee House of Representatives 98th district =

State legislative district in Tennessee

Tennessee's 98th State House of Representatives district
- Map of Tennessee House districts with the 98th District shaded in red
Representative
Antonio Parkinson; D–Memphis
since 2011
- Demographics: 21.3% White; 62.7% Black; 10.5% Hispanic; 2.1% Asian; 3% Multiracial
- Population (2024): 71,254

The Tennessee House of Representatives 98th district is one of the 99 legislative districts in the lower house of the Tennessee General Assembly. The district is located in West Tennessee and covers part of central Shelby County. The district includes parts of northeast Memphis and a small area of Bartlett. It includes areas such as Raleigh and Egypt. Antonio Parkinson has represented the district since 2011.

== Demographics ==
The Tennessee Comptroller estimates the population as of 2024 at 71,254.

- 62.7% of the district is Black
- 21.3% of the district is White
- 10.5% of the district is Hispanic
- 2.1% of the district is Asian
- 3% of the district is Two or more races

Detailed demographic information is also available through Census Reporter.

== History ==
The 88th Tennessee General Assembly was the first in which all districts were numbered. The 98th district has been part of Shelby County since it was created.

== List of Representatives ==
Representative	Party	Years of Service	General Assembly	Hometown
Antonio Parkinson	Democratic	March 8, 2011 - present	107th-114th	Memphis
Ulysses Jones Jr.	Democratic	January 13, 1987 - November 9, 2010*	95th-106th	Memphis
Harper Brewer Jr.	Democratic	1973-1986	88th-94th	Memphis

- Ulysses Jones Jr. died in office, Antonio Parkinson was elected after a special election in March.
