= Pete Drew =

American politician (born 1938)

Member of the Tennessee House of Representatives from the 15th district
- In office January 11, 1983 – January 10, 1989
- Preceded by: Sharon Bell
- Succeeded by: Joe E. Armstrong

Personal details
- Born: October 14, 1938 (age 88)
- Party: Republican (1985–2006, 2022–present)
- Other political affiliations: Democratic (1982–1985, 2008–2014); Independent (2006–2008, 2014–2022)
- Spouse: Joyce
- Children: 12
- Occupation: Politician; consultant; construction site manager

Military service
- Allegiance: United States
- Branch/service: United States Navy
- Years of service: 1958–1961
- Rank: Petty officer first class

Charles E. "Pete" Drew (born October 14, 1938) is an American politician who served as a member of the Tennessee House of Representatives from 1983 to 1989. Elected as a Democrat, he represented the 15th district. In office, he switched parties and became a Republican, making him one of five Black Republicans elected to state office at the time. After leaving the legislature, Drew continued to seek elected office, running in state and local elections under Democratic, Republican, and independent affiliations.

== Early life and career ==
Charles E. "Pete" Drew was born on October 14, 1938, to parents Herman and Katie (née Hemphill) Drew. He graduated from Austin High School, where he was a member of the All-State basketball team.

He served in the United States Navy from 1958 to 1961, where he held the rank of petty officer first class. He then attended radio broadcast school and Cooper's Business School, where he studied auto body repair.

Drew held several positions over his career. At the time of his election to the Tennessee House of Representatives, he was a Plexiglas processor, before entering real estate and consultancy.

He served on the Knox County Commission between 1976 and 1982. He has also served on the board of the Beck Cultural Exchange Center, as a member of the Knoxville Metropolitan Planning Commission, and in the YMCA and NAACP. In 1985, he became an alumnus of Leadership Knoxville, alongside state senator Ben Atchley and UT System president Edward Boling.

== Tennessee House of Representatives ==
=== Elections ===
Drew was first elected to the Tennessee House of Representatives in 1982, flipping the seat blue after incumbent Republican Sharon Bell retired to successfully run for judge of the Knox County General Sessions Court.

In 1985, Drew switched party affiliation and became a Republican. He won his 1986 re-election campaign, making him one of only five Black Republicans elected to any state legislature in the country.

In 1988, Drew was defeated by Democratic challenger Joe Armstrong in his bid for re-election to a fourth term.

=== Tenure ===
In the 1984 and 1985 legislative sessions, Drew introduced "The Balanced Treatment for Creation-Science and Evolution-Science Act," describing the measure as an effort to provide "teaching that puts God back in the classroom." The bill's 1985 version was indefinitely deferred by the House Education Committee after a 15-4 vote, with fellow Democrat Stephen Cobb calling it a "misuse of the power of the state."

In 1987, he became president of the Tennessee State Black Caucus.

== Later life ==
After leaving the General Assembly in 1989, Drew became a lobbyist for Tennessee Right to Life. He then worked as a construction site manager, and served as a director for the Project Respect Youth Program, a youth abstinence initiative. Most recently, Drew was employed at Honey Rock Thrift Store, while also teaching at Honey Rock Victorious Church in East Knoxville.

=== Subsequent elections ===
Drew has continued to be a frequent candidate on Knox County ballots. Since 2006, Drew has appeared on the ballot in several elections, running for various offices as a Republican, Democrat, and independent.

Drew attempted to return to the 15th district seat in 2006 and 2014. Both times, he ran as an independent, leading to rematches against Armstrong. Though no Republican ran during either cycle, Drew was handily defeated both times.

In 2016, Drew announced another campaign for the 15th district. Since the last election, federal investigators had charged Armstrong on federal tax evasion charges. Drew won notable support, including the endorsement of the Tennessee Right to Life PAC. However, after being found guilty, Armstrong was disqualified from the ballot and replaced by Democrat Rick Staples. After this change, Drew acknowledged that he was unlikely to win the election — since his time in office, the area had become heavily Democratic. When reflecting on his status as a perennial candidate, Drew expressed that he viewed the label positively, saying, "When you don't provide opposition, you say, ′I'm in lockstep with political leaders.′" Though Drew won a significantly higher percentage of the votes than in his previous two attempts, Staples still defeated him.

In both 2012 and 2018, he received votes to represent the 15th district in the state house for the seat as a write-in candidate. In 2022, he ran for the seat as a declared independent against Sam McKenzie. Drew has also run twice to return to the Knox County Commission and run twice for Knoxville City Council.

== Political positions ==
Drew's political positions have been identified as conservative. In his later campaigns, he expressed opposition to abortion, marijuana legalization, and Medicaid expansion under the Affordable Care Act. He also advocated for school vouchers and the incorporation of biblical teachings into science education.

== Personal life ==
Drew is married to his wife Joyce, and he has 12 children. They attend Honey Rock Victorious Church.
