= Tennessee House of Representatives 6th district =

State legislative district in Tennessee

Tennessee's 6th State House of Representatives district
- Map of Tennessee House districts with the 6th District shaded in red
Representative
Tim Hicks; R–Gray
- Demographics: 87.4% White; 2.7% Black; 3.5% Hispanic; 1.8% Asian; 0.5% Other; 3.9% Multiracial
- Population (2024): 69,371

The Tennessee House of Representatives 6th district is one of 99 legislative districts in the Tennessee House of Representatives. The district represents western and northern Washington County. It includes much of Johnson City, Oak Grove, and extends along the county line to Limestone It has been represented by Tim HIcks since 2021.

== Demographics ==
The Tennessee Comptroller estimates the population as of 2024 at 69,371.

- 87.4% of the district is White
- 2.7% of the district is African American
- 3.5% of the district is Hispanic
- 1.8% of the district is Asian
- 0.5% of the district is some other race
- 3.9% of the district is Two or more races

Detailed demographic information is also available through Census Reporter.

== List of representatives ==
Representative	Party	Years of service	General Assembly	Residence
Tim Hicks	Republican	2021–present	112th-114th	Gray
James Van Huss	Republican	2013–2021	108th-111th	Jonesborough
Dale Ford	Republican	2007-2012	105th-107th	Jonesborough
David Davis	Republican	1999–2007	101st-104th	Johnson City

== Electoral history ==
=== 2024 ===
2024 Tennessee House of Representatives election, District 6
Party	Candidate	Votes	%
Republican	Tim Hicks (incumbent)	22,531	72.95
Democratic	Brad Batt	8,356	27.05
Total votes		30,887	100.00

=== 2022 ===
2022 Tennessee House of Representatives election, District 6
Party	Candidate	Votes	%
Republican	Tim Hicks (incumbent)	13,980	76.55
Independent	Joel Goodman	4,283	23.45
Total votes		18,263	100.00

=== 2020 ===
2020 Tennessee House of Representatives election, District 6
Party	Candidate	Votes	%
Republican	Tim Hicks	21,557	72.67
Democratic	Brad Batt	8,107	27.32
Total votes		29,664	100.00

=== 2018 ===
2018 Tennessee House of Representatives election, District 6
Party	Candidate	Votes	%
Republican	James Van Huss (incumbent)	15,892	68.09
Independent	Murphey Johnson	7,449	31.91
Total votes		23,341	100.00

=== 2016 ===
2016 Tennessee House of Representatives election, District 6
Party	Candidate	Votes	%
Republican	James Van Huss (incumbent)	18,213	74.39
Democratic	John Baker	6,271	25.61
Total votes		24,484	100.00

=== 2014 ===
2014 Tennessee House of Representatives election, District 6
Party	Candidate	Votes	%
Republican	James Van Huss (incumbent)	11,416	100.00
Total votes		11,416	100.00

=== 2012 ===
2012 Tennessee House of Representatives election, District 6
Party	Candidate	Votes	%
Republican	James Van Huss	16,391	72.33
Democratic	Michael Clark	6,271	27.67
Total votes		22,662	100.00

=== 2010 ===
2010 Tennessee House of Representatives election, District 6
Party	Candidate	Votes	%
Republican	Dale Ford (incumbent)	14,531	100.00
Total votes		14,531	100.00

=== 2008 ===
2008 Tennessee House of Representatives election, District 6
Party	Candidate	Votes	%
Republican	Robert Dale Ford (incumbent)	19,175	100.00
Total votes		19,175	100.00

=== 2006 ===
2006 Tennessee House of Representatives election, District 6
Party	Candidate	Votes	%
Republican	Dale Ford	14,146	100.00
Total votes		14,176	100.00

=== 2004 ===
2004 Tennessee House of Representatives election, District 6
Party	Candidate	Votes	%
Republican	David Davis (incumbent)	19,340	100.00
Total votes		19,340	100.00

=== 2002 ===
2002 Tennessee House of Representatives election, District 6
Party	Candidate	Votes	%
Republican	David Davis (incumbent)	12,753	100.00
Write-in		186	1.4
Total votes		12,939	100.00

=== 2000 ===
2000 Tennessee House of Representatives election, District 6
Party	Candidate	Votes	%
Republican	David Davis (incumbent)	16,034	100.00
Write-in		382	2.3
Total votes		16,416	100.00
