= Dave Wright (Tennessee politician) =

American politician (born 1945)

David Wright
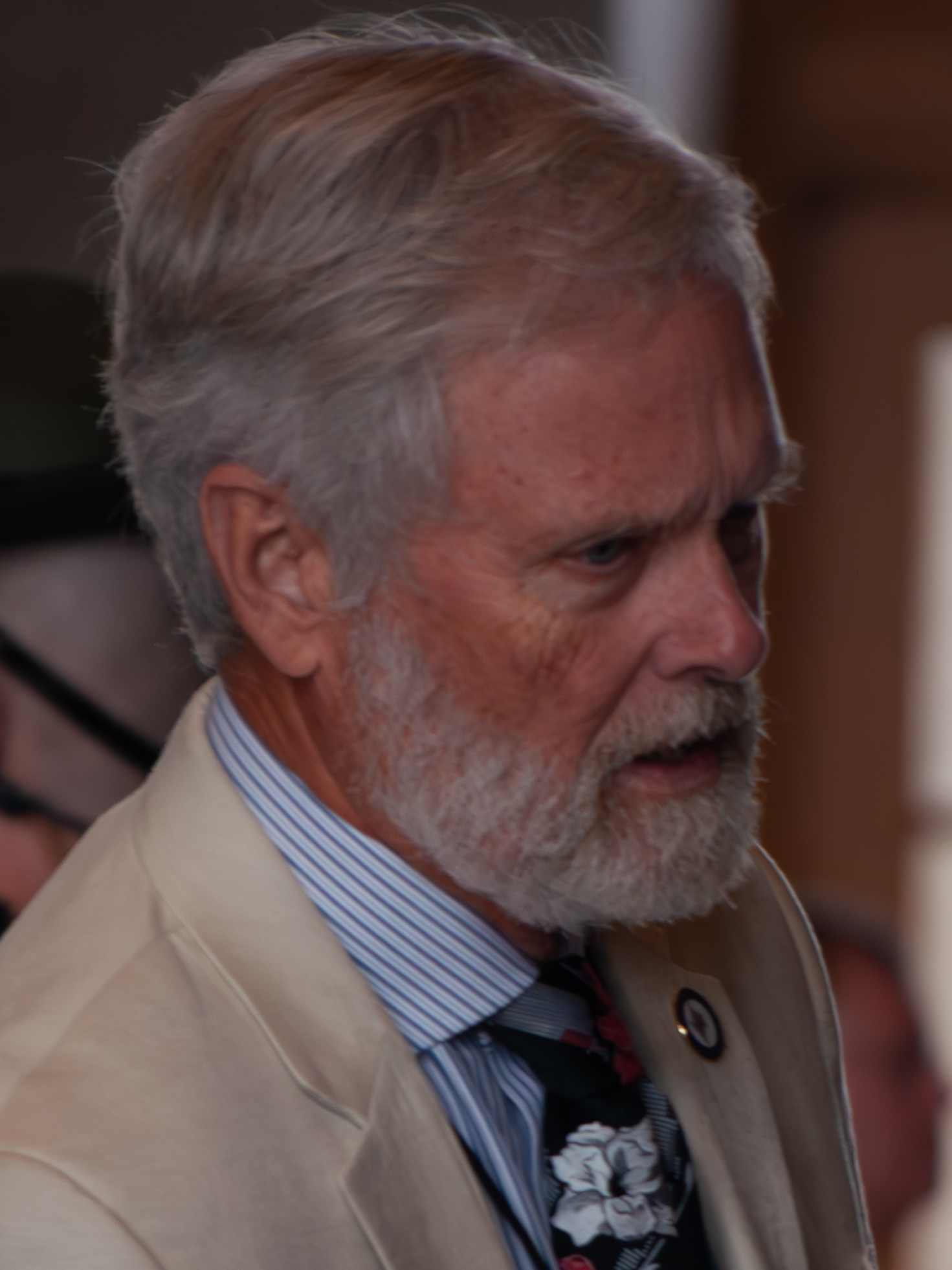
- Wright in 2023

Member of the Tennessee House of Representatives from the 19th district
- Incumbent
- Assumed office January 8, 2019
- Preceded by: Harry Brooks

Personal details
- Born: September 3, 1945 (age 81)
- Party: Republican
- Spouse: Pat
- Children: 1
- Education: University of Tennessee (BS)

Dave Wright (born September 3, 1945) is an American politician who currently serves as a member of the Tennessee House of Representatives. A Republican, Wright is based in Corryton, an unincorporated community in Knox County, and represents the 19th district, which consists of the northeastern parts of Knox County.

== Background ==
Dave Wright attended Gibbs High School in Corryton. He attended the University of Tennessee, where he received a Bachelor of Science in business administration. He also attended the U.S. Army Officer Candidate School. He is married to Pat and has one son, William, and a granddaughter, Ansley. He was a lieutenant in the U.S. Army during the Vietnam War, and worked for AT&T.

Wright was appointed to the Knox County Commission on February 20, 2008, and elected to a partial term the following August. He was elected to the state house in 2018 with 72.61% of the vote.

In 2023, Wright supported a resolution to expel Democratic lawmakers from the legislature for violating decorum rules. The expulsion was widely characterized as unprecedented.

Wright is a landlord with rental properties located in Corryton. Wright and his late wife, Patricia, were named as defendants in a court case involving a landlord-tenant dispute. The case centered upon habitability issues caused by a broken HVAC unit in the warehouse which was being rented out as a residence to a family with young children.

== Electoral history ==
=== 2008 ===
2008 Knox County, Tennessee County Commission District 8 Seat B Republican primary
Party	Candidate	Votes	%
Republican	Dave C. Wright (incumbent)	2,153	40.94
Republican	Gailen Porter	1,506	28.64
Republican	Kay Frazier	1,001	19.03
Republican	Jim Eubanks	469	8.92
Republican	Maurice David Freed	130	2.47
Total votes		5,259	100.00

2008 Knox County, Tennessee County Commission District 8 Seat B general election
Party	Candidate	Votes	%
Republican	Dave C. Wright (incumbent)	3,743	100.00
Total votes		3,743	100.00
Republican hold			

=== 2010 ===
2010 Knox County, Tennessee County Commission District 8 Republican primary
Party	Candidate	Votes	%
Republican	Dave Wright (incumbent)	3,064	75.58
Republican	Duane Bias	990	24.42
Total votes		4,054	100.00

2010 Knox County, Tennessee County Commission District 8 general election
Party	Candidate	Votes	%
Republican	Dave Wright (incumbent)	5,720	100.00
Total votes		5,720	100.00
Republican hold			

=== 2016 ===
2016 Knox County, Tennessee County Commission District 8 Republican primary
Party	Candidate	Votes	%
Republican	Dave Wright (incumbent)	4,705	100.00
Total votes		4,705	100.00

2016 Knox County, Tennessee County Commission District 8 general election
Party	Candidate	Votes	%
Republican	Dave Wright (incumbent)	1,140	79.50
Independent	Donald M. Wiser	294	20.50
Total votes		1,434	100.00
Republican hold			

=== 2018 ===
2018 Tennessee House of Representatives District 19 Republican Primary
Party	Candidate	Votes	%
Republican	Dave Wright	4,656	63.17
Republican	Dallas Sivley	1,756	23.82
Republican	Donald Wiser	959	13.01
Total votes		7,371	100.00

2018 Tennessee House of Representatives District 19 general election
Party	Candidate	Votes	%
Republican	Dave Wright	15,174	72.59
Democratic	Edward Nelson	5,050	24.16
Independent	Michelle Westover	679	3.25
Total votes		20,903	100.00
Republican hold			

=== 2020 ===
2020 Tennessee House of Representatives District 19 Republican primary
Party	Candidate	Votes	%
Republican	Dave Wright (incumbent)	6,660	100.00
Total votes		6,660	100.0

2020 Tennessee House of Representatives District 19 general election
Party	Candidate	Votes	%
Republican	Dave Wright (incumbent)	24,350	100.00
Total votes		24,350	100.00
Republican hold			

=== 2022 ===
2022 Tennessee House of Representatives District 19 Republican primary
Party	Candidate	Votes	%
Republican	Dave Wright (incumbent)	4,261	100.00
Total votes		4,261	100.00

2022 Tennessee House of Representatives District 19 general election
Party	Candidate	Votes	%
Republican	Dave Wright (incumbent)	13,181	74.76
Democratic	Zeke Streetman	3,823	21.68
Independent	Mary Ann Rochat	626	3.55
Total votes		17,630	100.00
Republican hold			

=== 2024 ===
2024 Tennessee House of Representatives District 19 Republican primary
Party	Candidate	Votes	%
Republican	Dave Wright (incumbent)	5,162	100.00
Total votes		5,162	100.00

2024 Tennessee House of Representatives District 19 general election
Party	Candidate	Votes	%
Republican	Dave Wright (incumbent)	27,784	100.00
Total votes		27,784	100.00
Republican hold			
