= Steve Hall (politician) =

American politician

Member of the Tennessee House of Representatives from the 18th district
- In office January 11, 2011 – January 13, 2015
- Preceded by: Stacey Campfield
- Succeeded by: Martin Daniel

Personal details
- Born: March 12, 1956 (age 70)
- Party: Republican
- Spouse: Married
- Children: 5
- Education: Pellissippi State Community College
- Website: House website

Steve Hall (born March 12, 1956) is a Republican and former member of the Tennessee House of Representatives for the 18th district, encompassing Knoxville and part of Knox County.

== Biography ==
Steve Hall was born on March 12, 1956. He received an associate degree from Pellissippi State Community College. He has also studied at the University of Tennessee.

He is the President and owner of the Interior Finishes Corporation, a contracting business. From 2001 to 2009, he served on the city council of Knoxville. He is the Chairman of the Knoxville Beer Board, and a past Board Member of the Community Television. He is a member of the Tennessee Right to Life, the National Rifle Association of America, the Tennessee Conservative Union, and the Knoxville Tea Party.

He is married, with five children. He is a Baptist.
