= Harry Brooks (politician) =

American politician (born 1946)

Member of the Tennessee House of Representatives from the 19th district
- In office 2002 – January 8, 2019
- Succeeded by: Dave Wright

Personal details
- Born: September 3, 1946 (age 80)
- Party: Republican

Harry Brooks (born September 4, 1946) is a Republican politician from Knoxville, Tennessee. He represented District 19 in the Tennessee General Assembly from 2002 to 2019.

== Biography ==
Brooks was born September 4, 1946. He graduated from Maryville High School, competed his undergraduate work as a Speech and Communication major at Carson Newman College, and received his graduate degree from the University of Tennessee. He is married to Mary and has two children. He retired from law enforcement and was a business employer before pursuing politics.

He is from Knox County and represented the 19th District in the Tennessee General Assembly. During his time with the Tennessee General Assembly he served on the Education Committee, the State & Local Government Committee, the Finance Ways & Means Committee, and the Select Committee on Children and Youth. In 2009, he was appointed to chair the House Education Committee and in 2011 he was appointed to chair the Children and Family Affairs Committee as well as the Joint Ad Hoc Education Finance Committee.

== Legislation ==
In 2011, Brooks sponsored the Virtual Public Schools Act (HB 1030). The legislation, signed into law in May 2011, established provisions for state money to go to for-profit online schools.
