= Antonio Parkinson =

American politician (born 1969)

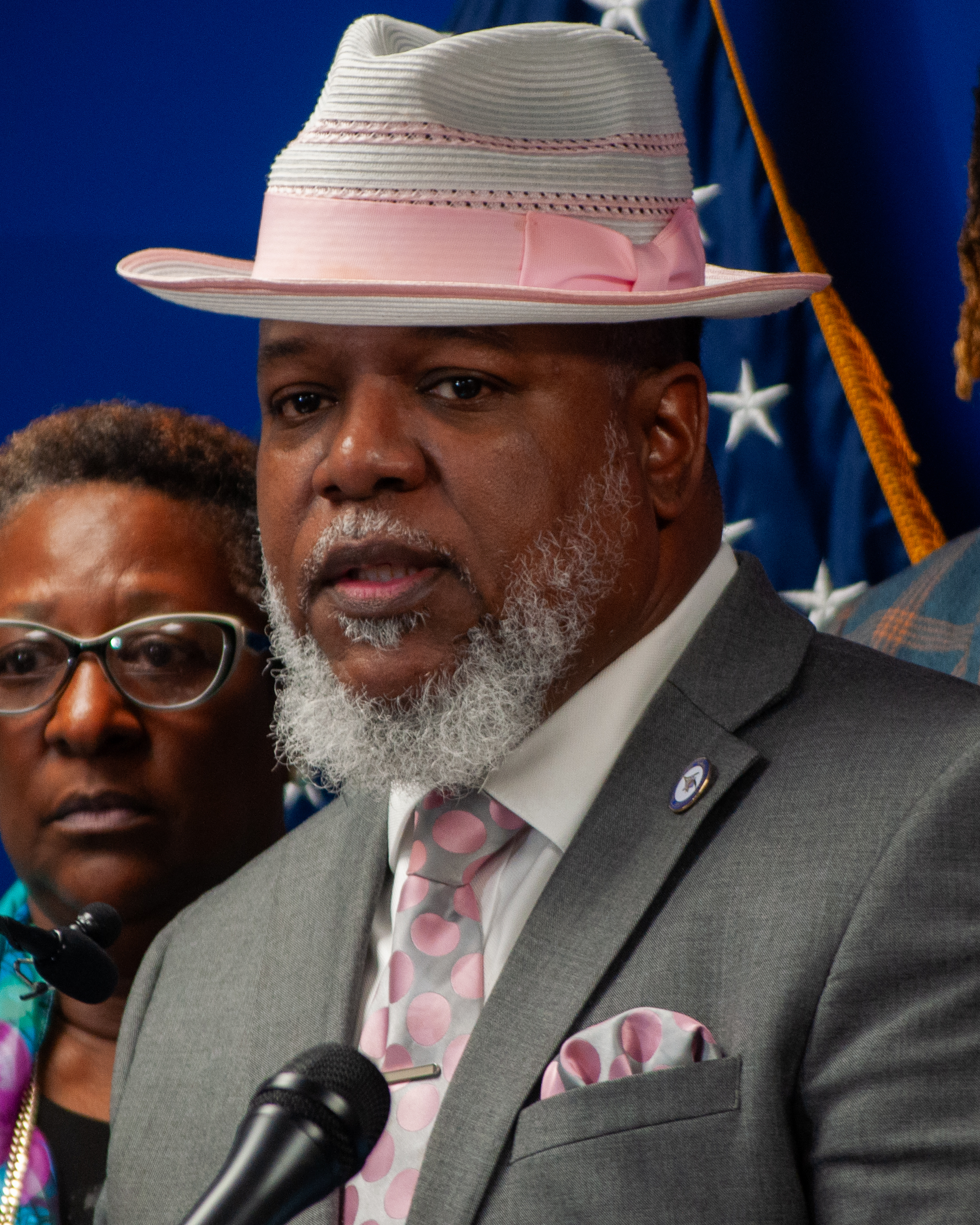
- Parkinson in 2023

Member of the Tennessee House of Representatives from the 98th district
- Incumbent
- Assumed office March 8, 2011
- Preceded by: Ulysses Jones, Jr.

Personal details
- Born: July 14, 1969 (age 57) Oakland, California, U.S.
- Party: Democratic
- Website: House website Campaign website

Military service
- Allegiance: United States
- Branch/service: United States Marines
- Years of service: 4.5 years
- Rank: Corporal
- Battles/wars: Operation Desert Storm

Antonio Parkinson (born July 14, 1969, in Oakland, California) is an American politician and a Democratic member of the Tennessee House of Representatives representing the 98th district since his special election March 8, 2011, following the death of Representative Ulysses Jones, Jr.

== Early life and business career ==
Antonio Parkinson was born July 14, 1969, in Oakland, California. He served in the United States Marine Corps, which led him to reside in Memphis, Tennessee. While living in Memphis, Parkinson joined the Shelby County Fire Department and rose to the ranks of Lieutenant before retiring.

Antonio Parkinson owns Black Market Strategies, a public relations and marketing firm. Prior to becoming owner, he served on the board of directors of ABetterMemphis.com, which created a vehicle for citizens of Memphis and Shelby County to voice their likes, dislikes, opinions and solutions for issues and opportunities within the city and county. Parkinson is also a member of Breath of Life Christian Center.

== Member of the Tennessee House of Representatives ==
Antonio Parkinson won a special election on March 8, 2011, in the 98th Legislative District of Tennessee following the death of Representative Ulysses Jones, Jr. Parkinson won 3,811 votes (nearly 100%) against write-in candidate Artie Smith. In 2012 Parkinson was unopposed for the August 2, 2012, Democratic Primary, winning with 3,688 votes and won the November 6, 2012, General election with 15,271 votes (100%) against write-in candidate Jacques Roberts.

Antonio Parkinson has been named Tennessee Legislator of the Year four times with one of the awards being Regional Legislator of the Year. Parkinson recognizes himself as a staunch fighter for public education and justice reform. He has governed as a moderate-to-conservative Democrat, supportive of gun rights.

Some of the more noteworthy legislation that Parkinson has passed is: The Healthy Workplace Act to eliminate workplace bullying in Tennessee; Kimberlee's Law to ensure that criminals convicted of aggravated rape serve 100% of their sentence (Tennessee is the first state in the union to pass Kimberlee type of legislation); The Neighborhood Protection Act to standing Neighborhood Associations, watch groups and others to file restraining orders for relief from criminals that target their neighborhoods; TN House of Representatives Cosmetology law, that created apprenticeships for cosmetology students and allows for free standing schools of natural hair, aesthetics and manicuring in the state of Tennessee.

Following the 2026 Tennessee redistricting which dismantled the state's sole majority-minority 9th congressional district based in Memphis, Parkinson proposed that the city secede from Tennessee to become its own state.
