= Harper Brewer Jr. =

American politician

Member of the Tennessee House of Representatives from the 98th district
- In office January 13, 1973 – January 13, 1987
- Preceded by: Constituency established (Note: Before 1973, Tennessee apportioned many of its state representatives by county rather than district. Due to this apportionment method, Tennessee had no specific 98th House district, even though it had 99 representatives.)
- Succeeded by: Ulysses Jones Jr.

Personal details
- Born: December 22, 1937 (age 88) Memphis, Tennessee, U.S.
- Party: Democratic
- Education: Fisk University; Nashville School of Law
- Occupation: Politician; educator

Harper Brewer Jr. (born December 22, 1937), was an American politician in the state of Tennessee. Brewer served in the Tennessee House of Representatives as a Democrat from the 98th District from 1973 to 1987. A native of Memphis, Tennessee, he was an educator and alumnus of the Nashville School of Law and Fisk University.
