= Tim Hicks (politician) =

American politician (born 1963)

Member of the Tennessee House of Representatives from the 6th district
- Incumbent
- Assumed office January 12, 2021
- Preceded by: James Van Huss

Personal details
- Born: August 29, 1963 (age 63)
- Party: Republican
- Spouse: Keri
- Children: 1

Tim Hicks (born August 29, 1963) is an American businessman and politician serving as a member of the Tennessee House of Representatives from the 6th district. He assumed office on January 12, 2021.

== Education ==
Hicks graduated from Daniel Boone High School in 1981.

== Career ==
In 2023, the Tennessee House voted on motions to remove three sitting Democratic representatives — Gloria Johnson, Justin Jones, and Justin J. Pearson — for disrupting proceedings with a protest as citizens were at the capitol voicing their outrage over a mass shooting at a Nashville school that left six dead. Hicks voted in favor of all three resolutions: HR 63, to remove Pearson; HR 64, to remove Johnson; and HR 65, to remove Jones. Pearson and Jones were expelled, while Johnson was not.

Outside of politics, Hicks owns Hicks Construction. He was elected to the Tennessee House of Representatives in November 2020 after defeating incumbent James Van Huss in the August 2020 Republican primary.

In March 2026, Hicks sponsored a bill that would allow property owners and developers to sue local governments over the enforcement of zoning laws. Hicks withdrew the bill from consideration on March 23.

== Personal life ==
He and his wife, Keri, have one child.
