= Ulysses Jones Jr. =

American politician

Member of the Tennessee House of Representatives from the 98th district
- In office January 13, 1987 – November 9, 2010
- Preceded by: Harper Brewer Jr.
- Succeeded by: Antonio Parkinson

Personal details
- Born: June 7, 1951 Memphis, Tennessee, U.S.
- Died: November 9, 2010 (aged 59) Memphis, Tennessee, U.S.
- Party: Democratic
- Children: 2
- Education: University of Memphis; Tennessee State University
- Website: House website

Ulysses Jones Jr. (June 7, 1951 – November 9, 2010) was an American politician and a Democratic member of the Tennessee House of Representatives. He represented the 98th district, encompassing parts of Shelby County, from 1987 to 2010.

== Early life and education ==
Ulysses Jones Jr. was born on June 7, 1951, in Memphis, Tennessee. He graduated from North Side High School and then attended the University of Memphis and Tennessee State University.

== Career ==
He worked as a battalion chief for Memphis Fire Services. When Elvis Presley died on August 16, 1977, Ulysses Jones and Charles Crossby were the two paramedics on the scene at Graceland when it was reported to Memphis Fire Department's Engine House No. 29 that a person was having trouble breathing. Jones was also interviewed by Albert Goldman for his book "Elvis", he also appeared on several TV shows talking about that day.

== Tennessee House of Representatives (1987–2010) ==
=== Elections ===
Jones was first elected to the Tennessee House of Representatives in 1986, defeating fellow Democrat Harper Brewer Jr. in the primary election in the heavily blue district. He was re-elected twelve times, serving almost twenty-four years in the legislature. Days after his final election victory, his House colleague Larry Miller publicly announced Jones had passed away.

=== Tenure ===
Jones served in several roles in the House of Representatives, most notably as Chair of the Ethics Committee and Vice Chair of the House State and Local Government Committee.

He was also a member of numerous House committees and subcommittees: the Education Committee, the K-12 Subcommittee, the Local Government Subcommittee, the Joint Lottery Oversight Committee, the Joint Select Oversight Committee on Education, and the Tennessee Commemorative Women's Suffrage Commission.

==== Operation Tennessee Waltz ====
It has been alleged by Tim Willis, informant for Operation Tennessee Waltz, that Ulysses Jones took a bribe from E-Cycle, a fictitious company that had been set up by the FBI. Jones said in response that it had only been a campaign contribution, and that he would "be willing to take a lie detector test, even by the FBI."

== Personal life ==
Jones had two children. He was a Baptist.

== Death and will ==
Jones died on November 9, 2010, after suffering a collapsed lung. Afterward, concerns regarding his will led to a public estate battle. The apparent will left the majority of Jones' estate to Sandra Richards, a fellow firefighter. However, on May 6, 2011, a judge concluded that the signature on the will was forged and ruled in favor of Jones' children, who were challenging Richards' right to the estate. Despite some reports that Jones and Richards were in a relationship, Jones' son denied these claims and purported that neither he nor other family members knew Richards.

The following December, Richards, Avis Langford-Brannon, and Beverly Prye were indicted on forgery charges.
