= Eddie Mannis =

American politician (born 1959)

Member of the Tennessee House of Representatives from the 18th district
- In office January 12, 2021 – January 10, 2023
- Preceded by: Martin Daniel
- Succeeded by: Elaine Davis

Personal details
- Born: April 14, 1959 (age 67)
- Party: Republican
- Website: House website

Eddie Mannis (born April 14, 1959) is an American former politician, who was a member of the Tennessee House of Representatives from 2021 to 2023. He represented the 18th House District as a member of the Tennessee Republican Party.

Mannis, a businessman from Knoxville, previously ran for mayor of the city in the 2019 Knoxville mayoral election, winning the first round but losing the runoff to Indya Kincannon. His victory in the 2020 Republican state house primaries was initially challenged by candidate Gina Oster on the grounds that Mannis had voted in the 2020 Democratic Party presidential primaries, but was upheld after Mannis affirmed that he is a moderate Republican and voted crossover solely to prevent Bernie Sanders or Elizabeth Warren from becoming the Democratic nominee.

Alongside Torrey Harris, Mannis was of the first two openly LGBT state representatives elected in Tennessee.

Mannis did not seek a second term to the legislature in 2022.
