= Joe E. Armstrong =

American politician (born 1956)

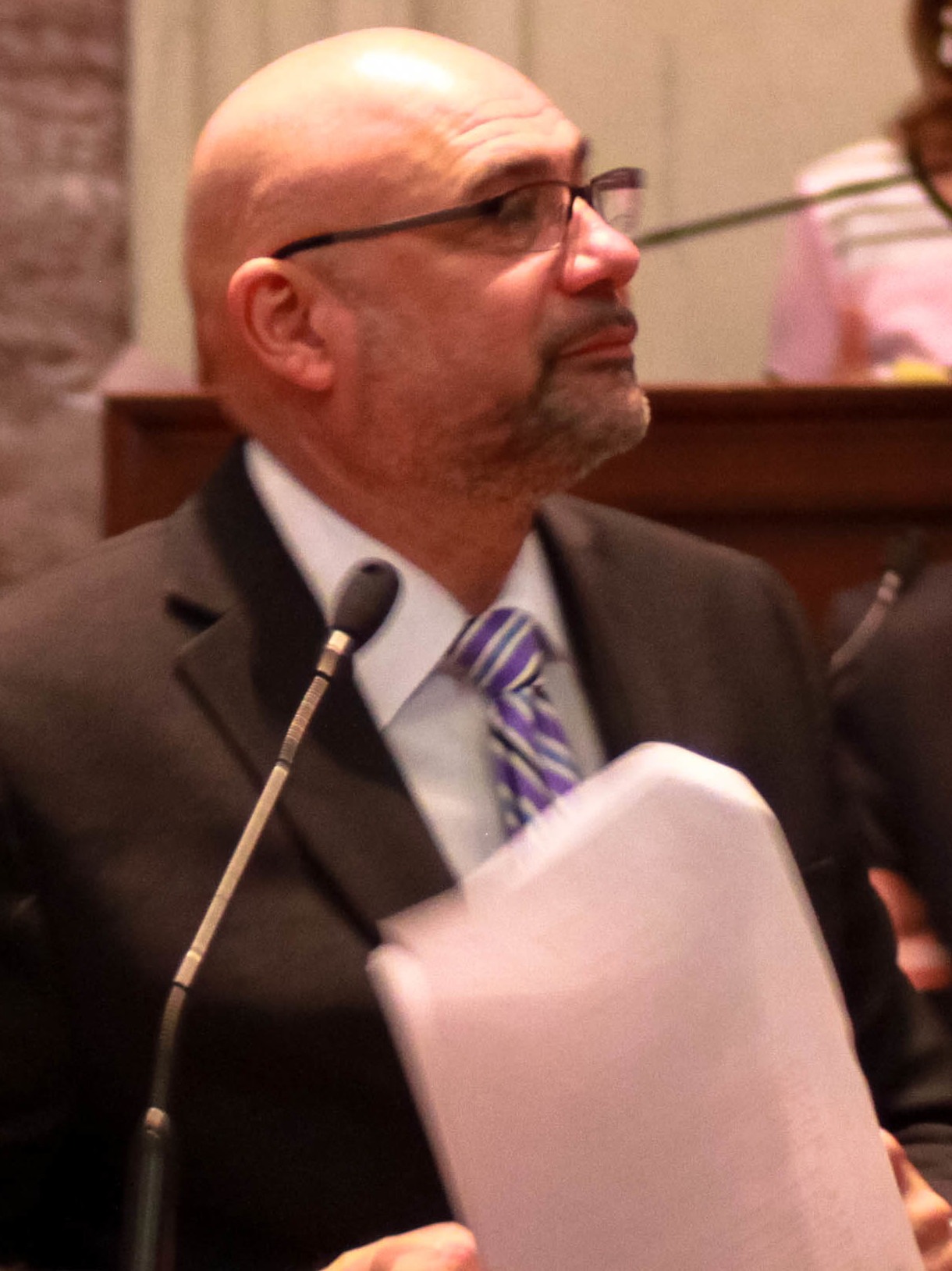
- Armstrong in 2014

Member of the Tennessee House of Representatives from the 15th district
- In office January 10, 1989 – September 12, 2016
- Preceded by: Pete Drew
- Succeeded by: Rick Staples

Personal details
- Born: November 30, 1956 (age 69) Knoxville, Tennessee, U.S.
- Party: Democratic
- Children: 4
- Education: University of Tennessee (BS)
- Website: House website

Joe E. Armstrong (born November 30, 1956, in Knoxville, Tennessee) is an American politician and a member of the Tennessee House of Representatives for the 15th district, which encompasses part of Knox County. He has served as a state representative since being elected to the 96th Tennessee General Assembly.

Joe Armstrong is the Democratic Caucus Vice-Chairman, the Chair of the House Health and Human Resources Committee, and the Chairman of the Consumer and Employee Affairs Committee. He is a member of the Calendar and Rules Committee, the Finance, Ways and Means Committee, the Budget Subcommittee, and the Joint TennCare Oversight Committee. Before being elected to the state legislature, Armstrong served on the Knox County Board of Commissioners from 1982 to 1988. During that period, he was also the Vice-Chairman.

Armstrong graduated from the University of Tennessee in 1981 with a Bachelor of Science degree in Business Administration. He currently works as an insurance manager.

Armstrong was convicted of falsifying tax returns on 8 August 2016 and sentenced to three years probation.

== Removal of breath mints from University of Tennessee ==
Armstrong asked that breath mints with packaging that satirized President Barack Obama be removed from the University of Tennessee bookstore, on the grounds that a state university not sell products defaming public officials. The vice chancellor for communication at the university believed that the action did not constitute violation of freedom of speech, though a teacher of constitutional law at UT described the action as "a species of censorship." The removal of the product prompted publicity, and the company producing the mints fashioned a mock-up with a caricature of Armstrong.
