= Martin Daniel =

American politician (born 1956)

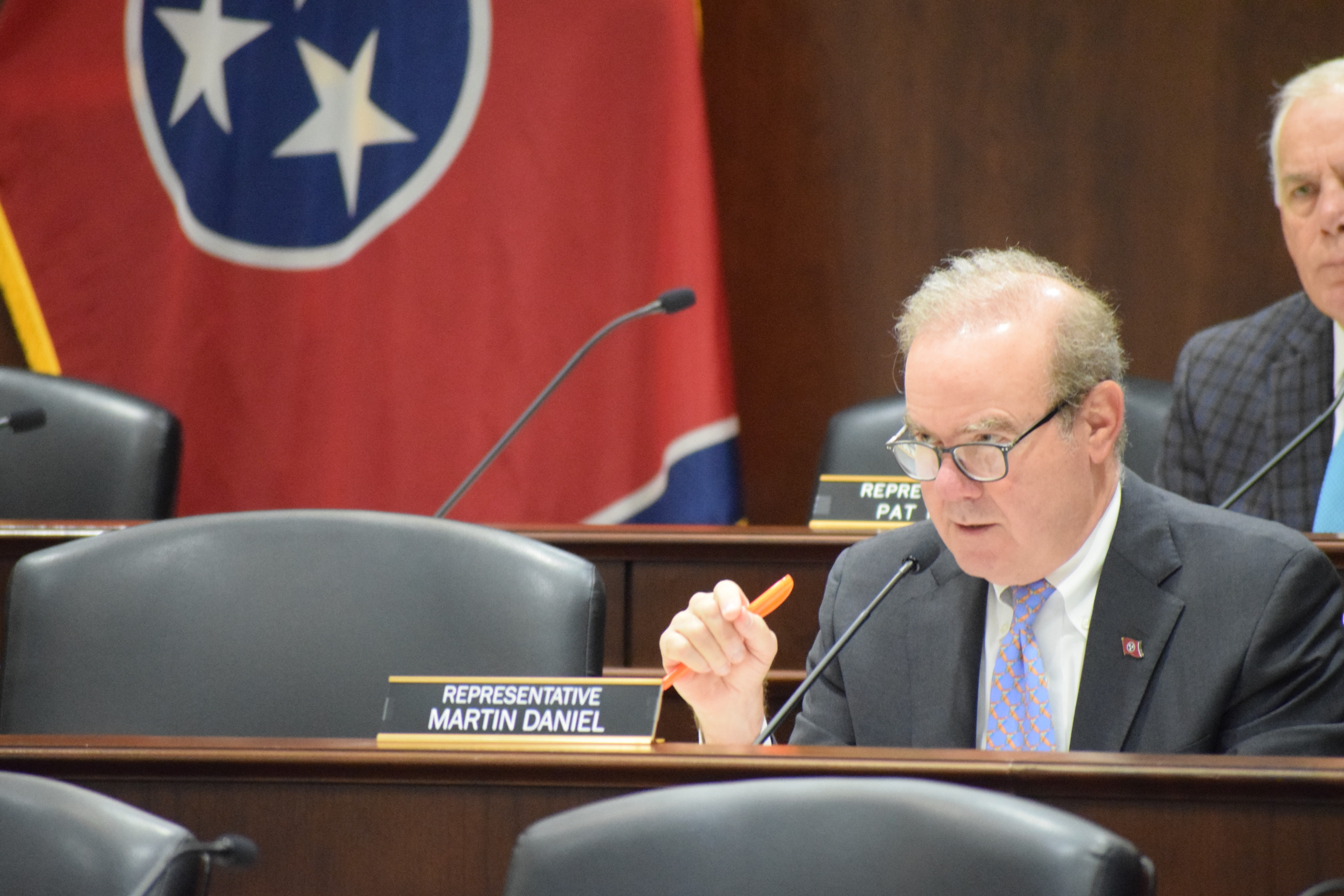
- Daniel in 2019

Member of the Tennessee House of Representatives from the 18th district
- In office January 13, 2015 – January 12, 2021
- Preceded by: Steve Hall
- Succeeded by: Eddie Mannis

Personal details
- Born: December 17, 1956 (age 69)
- Party: Republican
- Spouse: Melissa Daniel
- Children: 2
- Education: University of Tennessee (BS, MBA); University of Memphis (JD)
- Website: House website

Martin Daniel (born December 17, 1956) is a Republican party member and formerly a member of Tennessee's House of Representatives, representing District 18 of Knox County from 2014 until his retirement from government in 2020.

== Education and background ==
=== Education ===
In 1982, Daniel went to University of Tennessee-Knoxville to study for his Master of Business Administration (MBA) in business and marketing. While there, he also earned a Bachelor of Science degree in general business. Martin Daniel also received a Juris Doctor at the University of Memphis in 1985.

=== Professional experience ===
Daniel is currently a business owner and manager of Elevation Outdoor Advertising, LLC as well as serving president of Defeat Duchenne, Inc.

Other past experiences include:

- Owner of Tennessee Outdoor Advertising, Inc. (1992-1998).
- Owner of Emerald Outdoor Advertising (1993-1997).
- Owner of Delta Outdoor Advertising (1998-2002).

=== Political experience ===
Daniel began his political career as a member of the Tennessee House of Representatives in 2014 and was re-elected in November 2018. Daniel barely won the victory in the 2018 election against Greg Mackay for seat in House of Representatives.

=== 2018 election ===
In 2018, Daniel's re-election victory for the District 18 against Greg Mackay.

District 18 2018 election
Candidates	Votes	Percentage
Martin Daniel (Republican)	12,865	52.5%
Greg Mackay (Democrat)	12,118	48.5%

== Current committees ==
Committees
Chairman
Government Operations Committee
Joint Committee on Government Operations

Committees
Member
Calendar and Rules Committee
Joint Committee on Fiscal Review
Judiciary Committee
Subcommittee on Civil Justice
Subcommittee on Infrastructure
Transportation Committee

== Honors and awards ==
In 2017, Martin Daniel received both the "Guardian of Small Business" Award and Legislator of the Year, awarded by the Tennessee Community Organization.

== Personal life ==
Daniel was born in Memphis, Tennessee, in 1956. He lives with his wife, Melissa, and their two children in Knoxville, Tennessee.
