= Sharon Bell =

American politician (1944–2024)

Member of the Tennessee House of Representatives from the 15th district
- In office January 9, 1979 – January 11, 1983
- Preceded by: William B. Nolan
- Succeeded by: Pete Drew

Personal details
- Born: Sharon Joyce Bell; June 30, 1944 Birmingham, Alabama, U.S.
- Died: October 27, 2024 (aged 80)
- Party: Republican
- Education: Auburn University; University of Tennessee (JD)
- Occupation: Politician; judge; lawyer
- Website: House website

Sharon Joyce Bell (June 30, 1944 – October 27, 2024) was an American politician and jurist from the state of Tennessee. She served as a Republican member of the Tennessee House of Representatives from 1978 to 1982.

== Life and career ==
Born in Birmingham, Alabama, Bell earned a bachelor's degree from Auburn University, then a law degree from the University of Tennessee. She then took up the practice of law in the Knoxville area. When she was elected to the Tennessee House of Representatives in 1978, she was one of only four women members, and was the only Republican woman in the chamber. In 1982, she was elected judge of the Knox County General Sessions Court, then in 1986, she became the first female chancellor in Tennessee, and she would sit on the Knox County Chancery Court Division III until her retirement in 2006. She died at the age of 80 on October 27, 2024.
