= James Van Huss =

American politician

Micah Van Huss
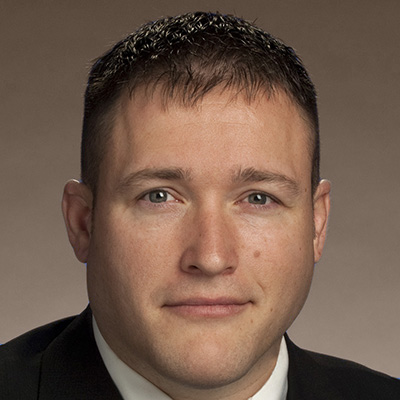

Member of the Tennessee House of Representatives from the 6th district
- In office January 8, 2013 – January 12, 2021
- Preceded by: Dale Ford
- Succeeded by: Tim Hicks

Personal details
- Born: December 31, 1978 (age 47)
- Party: Republican
- Spouse: Annie
- Children: Dixie and Rose
- Education: Pensacola Christian College (BS)
- Profession: Web programmer
- Website: micahvanhuss.com

Military service
- Branch/service: United States Marine Corps
- Battles/wars: Iraq War; War in Afghanistan

James "Micah" Van Huss (born December 31, 1978) is an American politician and former Republican member of the Tennessee House of Representatives, representing House District 6; he took office on January 8, 2013.

== Education ==
Van Huss completed his BS with a major in Computer Science and a minor in E-Business and Graphic Design from Pensacola Christian College during 2003.

After graduating from Pensacola Christian College, Van Huss started up his online Christian video gaming site, LordPickle.com, and other related web sites.

== Legislative career ==
In 2012 Van Huss challenged District 6 incumbent Representative Dale Ford in the August 2, 2012 Republican Primary, winning with 3,154 votes (53.9%), and won the November 6, 2012 General election with 16,391 votes (72.3%) against Democratic nominee Michael Clark.

In 2018, Van Huss was widely ridiculed for quoting the well-known satirical website The Onion in connection with a bill on hazing. In January 2020, he introduced a bill that would recognize CNN and the Washington Post as fake news.

The American Conservative Union gave him a 100% rating in 2013 and a 91% evaluation in 2017.

On June 19, 2020, during the COVID-19 pandemic, the Tennessee House of Representatives passed House Resolution 340, introduced by Van Huss, resolving that the "mainstream media has sensationalized the reporting on COVID-19 in the service of political agendas."

== Professional career ==
In 2021, the conservative publicly policy organization Americans for Prosperity announced that Van Huss would lead their grassroots activities in upper East Tennessee. In 2022 Van Huss published his first book through Southwest Radio Ministries.
