= Sam McKenzie =

American politician (born 1965)

Member of the Tennessee House of Representatives from the 15th district
- Incumbent
- Assumed office January 12, 2021
- Preceded by: Rick Staples

Personal details
- Born: October 26, 1965 (age 61) Knoxville, Tennessee, U.S.
- Party: Democratic
- Children: 3
- Relatives: Raleigh McKenzie (brother); Reggie McKenzie (brother); Kahlil McKenzie (nephew)
- Education: Fisk University (BS); University of Memphis (MS)
- Website: House website Campaign website

Sam McKenzie (born October 26, 1965) is an American politician serving as a member of the Tennessee House of Representatives from the 15th district. He assumed office on January 12, 2021.

== Early life and education ==
McKenzie was born in Knoxville, Tennessee. After graduating from Austin-East High School earned a BS in Fisk University and a MS in physics from the University of Memphis. He is a former district representative for Omega Psi Phi.

== Career ==
Prior to entering politics, McKenzie worked as a scientist at the Oak Ridge National Laboratory, where he managed maintenance on the Spallation Neutron Source. He was elected to the Tennessee House of Representatives on November 3, 2020, succeeding incumbent Democrat Rick Staples.

== Personal life ==
McKenzie has older twin brothers, Raleigh McKenzie and Reggie McKenzie, who both played in the NFL.
