= Rick Staples =

American politician (born 1970)

Member of the Tennessee House of Representatives from the 15th district
- In office January 10, 2017 – January 12, 2021
- Preceded by: Joe E. Armstrong
- Succeeded by: Sam McKenzie

Personal details
- Born: March 12, 1970 (age 56)
- Party: Democratic
- Children: 4
- Education: University of Tennessee
- Website: House website

Rick Staples (born March 12, 1970) is an American politician who served as a member of the Tennessee House of Representatives from 2017 to 2020. A Democrat, he represented District 15, which includes parts of the city of Knoxville.

== Early life and education ==
Staples attended Holston High School in Knoxville, and the University of Tennessee. He is an account executive.

== Career ==
Staples was elected in 2016, succeeding Joe Armstrong, who had been convicted of a felony for a false tax return the previous August, and was thus ineligible to run for reelection.

Staples has served on multiple committees, including the Commerce Committee, Banking & Investments Subcommittee, Finance, Ways, & Means Committee, Finance, Ways, & Means Subcommittee, State Committee, Departments & Agencies Subcommittee, Joint Pensions and Insurance Committee.

In April 2019, Rep. Rick Staples, D-Knoxville, was found guilty by the ethics subcommittee of engaging in sexual harassment after an unnamed woman said he "grabbed and held on to her waist while standing behind her after he had made inappropriate comments about her appearance” during a visit to the legislature.

== Personal life ==
Staples is currently single, and has four children. He is a Baptist.
