= Nathan Bedford Forrest Monument =

Nathan Bedford Forrest Monument may refer to:

- Nathan Bedford Forrest Monument (Memphis, Tennessee), former monument in Memphis, Tennessee
- Nathan Bedford Forrest Monument (Rome, Georgia), partially deconstructed monument in Rome, Georgia
- Nathan Bedford Forrest Bust, bust in the Tennessee State Museum in Nashville, Tennessee
- Nathan Bedford Forrest Statue, former statue in Nashville, Tennessee
