= Monuments and memorials to Nathan Bedford Forrest =

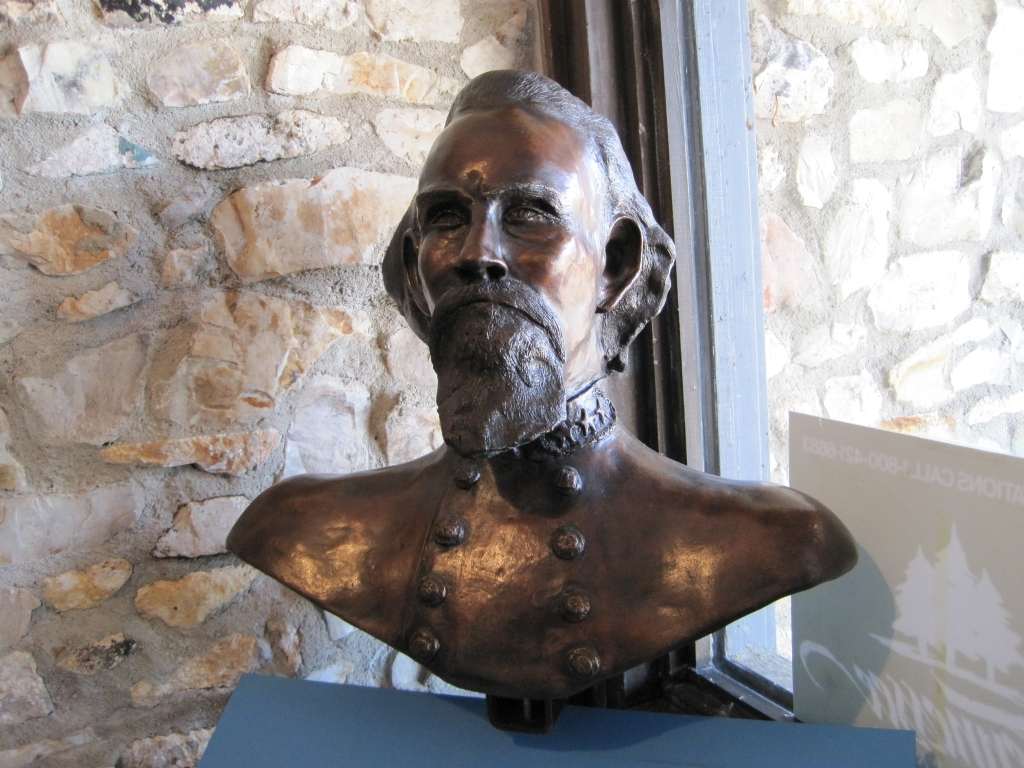
Bronze bust of Forrest at Nathan Bedford Forrest State Park

In the 19th and 20th centuries, many monuments and memorials were erected to slave trader, Confederate Army general, and Ku Klux Klan leader Nathan Bedford Forrest, especially in Tennessee and adjacent southern states. Forrest was elevated in Memphis—where he lived and died—to the status of folk hero. Historian Court Carney suggested that "embarrassed by their city's early capitulation during the Civil War, white Memphians desperately needed a hero and therefore crafted a distorted depiction of Forrest's role in the war." Moreover, a "strong Forrest cult exists among fans of the Lost Cause." Forrest's legacy as "one of the most controversial—and popular—icons of the war" still draws heated public debate. As of 2007, Tennessee had 32 dedicated historical markers linked to Nathan Bedford Forrest, more than were dedicated to all three former Presidents associated with the state combined: Andrew Jackson, James K. Polk, and Andrew Johnson. A Tennessee-based organization, the Sons of Confederate Veterans, posthumously awarded Forrest their Confederate Medal of Honor, created in 1977.

In the 21st century, as Forrest's legacy has been recontextualized, some of these monuments have been removed from their original locations, in some cases being added to museum collections instead. In addition to obelisks, busts, and equestrian statues erected in Forrest's honor, Forrest County, Mississippi is named after him, as is Forrest City, Arkansas.

== Forrest Park, Memphis ==
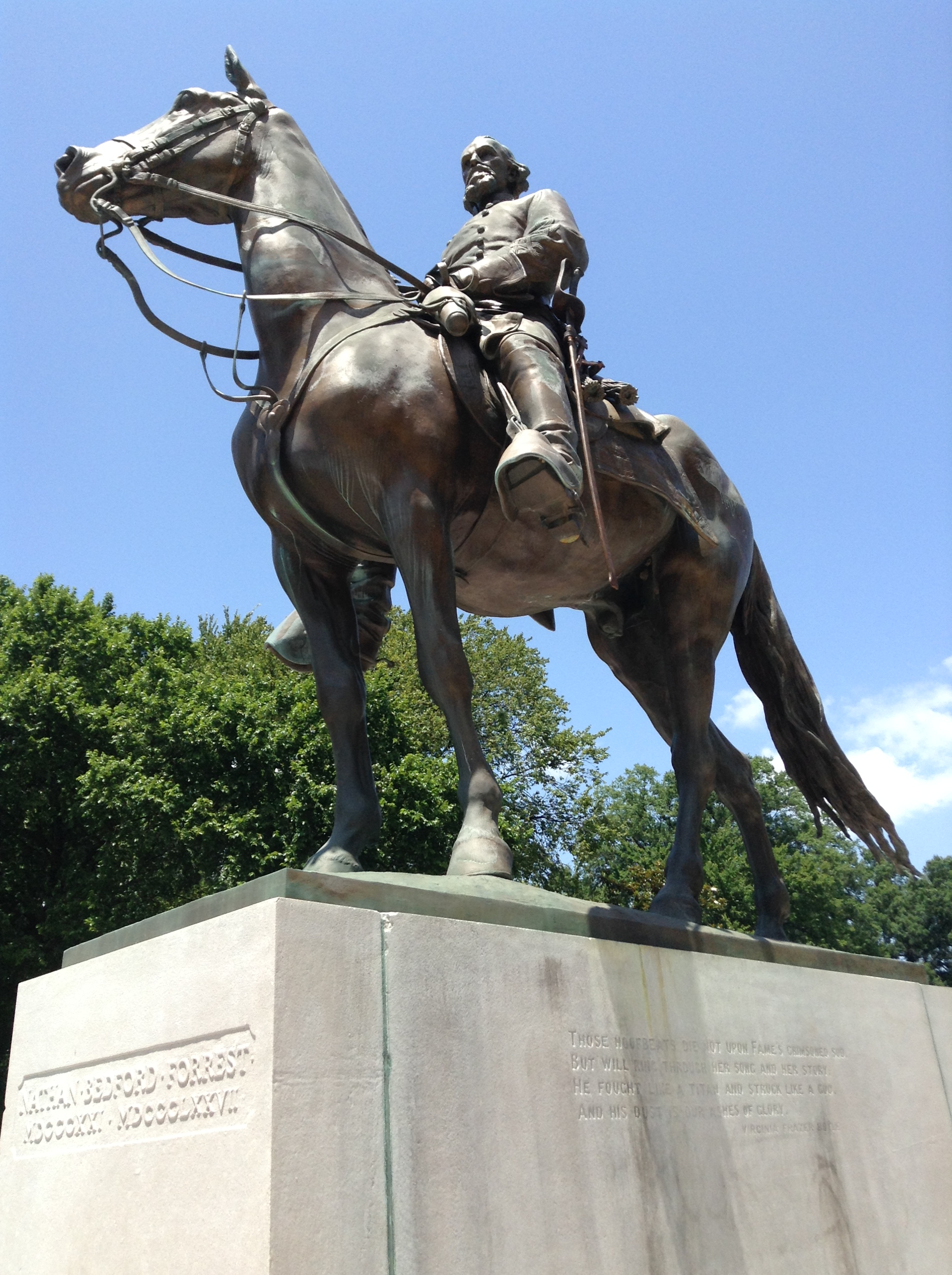
Nathan Bedford Forrest Monument (Memphis, Tennessee)

A memorial to him, the first Civil War memorial in Memphis, was erected in 1905 in a new Nathan Bedford Forrest Park. In 2005, Shelby County Commissioner Walter Bailey started an effort to move the statue over Forrest's grave and rename Forrest Park. Former Memphis Mayor Willie Herenton, who is black, blocked the move. In 2013, Forrest Park in Memphis was renamed the Health Sciences Park amid substantial controversy. In light of the 2015 church shooting in Charleston, South Carolina, some Tennessee lawmakers advocated removing a bust of Forrest located in the state's Capitol building. Subsequently, then-Mayor A C Wharton urged that the statue of Forrest be removed from the Health Sciences Park and suggested that the remains of Forrest and his wife be relocated to their original burial site in nearby Elmwood Cemetery. In a nearly unanimous vote on July 7, the Memphis City Council passed a resolution in favor of removing the statue and securing the couple's remains for transfer. The Tennessee Historical Commission denied removal on October 21, 2016, under the authority granted it by the Tennessee Heritage Protection Act of 2013, which prevents cities and counties from relocating, removing, renaming, or otherwise disturbing without permission war memorials on public property. The city council then voted on December 20, 2017, to sell Health Sciences Park to Memphis Greenspace, a new non-profit corporation not subject to the Heritage Protection Act, which removed the statue and another of Jefferson Davis that same evening. The Sons of Confederate Veterans threatened a lawsuit against the city. On April 18, 2018, the Tennessee House of Representatives punished Memphis by cutting $250,000 (~$306,677 in 2024) in appropriations for the city's bicentennial celebration. On June 3, 2021, the remains of Forrest and his wife were exhumed from their burial place in the park, where they had been for over a century, to be reburied in Columbia, Tennessee. The exhumation and reburial were the results of a campaign that began after the Unite the Right Rally in Charlottesville, Virginia, in 2017. The effort was spearheaded by Shelby County Commissioner Tami Sawyer, an educator and Memphis native who founded a group called Take 'Em Down 901 to advocate for the removal of Confederate iconography. After the Forrests' remains were removed from Memphis, they were reportedly buried in Munford, Tennessee until their reburial in Columbia in September 2021 by the Sons of Confederate Veterans.

== Statue in Rome, Georgia ==
Nathan Bedford Forrest Monument (Rome, Georgia) was erected by the United Daughters of the Confederacy in 1909 to honor his bravery for defending Rome from Union Army Colonel Abel Streight and his cavalry.

== Statue in Nashville, Tennessee ==
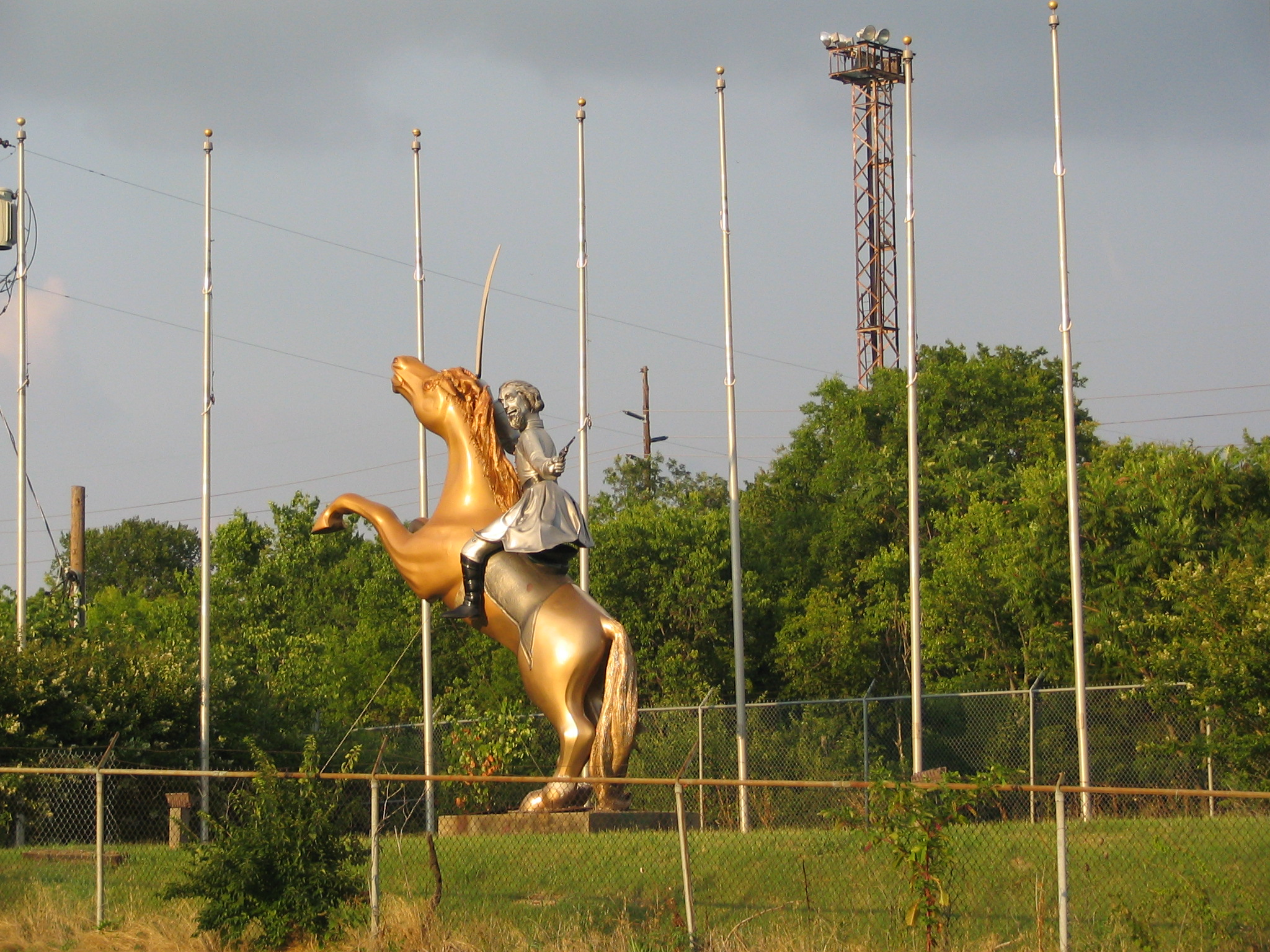
Forrest statue in Nashville

There was a monumental equestrian statue of Forrest in Nashville, Tennessee from 1998 to 2021. The Nathan Bedford Forrest Statue in Nashville was notable for its poor quality depiction of Forrest on horseback. After repeated incidents of vandalism, the statue was disassembled and removed following the death of its owner.

== Public schools ==
High schools named for Forrest were built in Chapel Hill, Tennessee, and Jacksonville, Florida.

- The school in Jacksonville was named for Forrest in 1959 at the urging of the Daughters of the Confederacy because they were upset about the 1954 Brown v. Board of Education decision. In 2008, the Duval County School Board voted 5–2 against a push to change the name of Nathan Bedford Forrest High School in Jacksonville. In 2013, the board voted 7–0 to begin the process to rename the school. The school was all white until Duval County schools were ordered to be desegregated in 1971, but now more than half the student body is black. After several public forums and discussions, Westside High School was unanimously approved in January 2014 as the school's new name.
- The Forrest Hill Academy high school in Atlanta, Georgia, which had been named for Forrest, was renamed the Hank Aaron New Beginnings Academy in April 2021 after the Atlanta Braves baseball star who had died less than three months prior.

== Middle Tennessee State University ==
In 1978, Middle Tennessee State University abandoned imagery it had formerly used (in 1951, the school's yearbook, The Midlander, featured the first appearance of Forrest's likeness as MTSU's official mascot) and MTSU president M. G. Scarlett removed the General's image from the university's official seal. The Blue Raiders' athletic mascot was changed to an ambiguous swash-buckler character called the "Blue Raider" to avoid association with Forrest or the Confederacy. The school unveiled its latest mascot, a winged horse named "Lightning" inspired by the mythological Pegasus, during halftime of a basketball game against rival Tennessee State University on January 17, 1998. The ROTC building at MTSU had been named Forrest Hall to honor him in 1958, but the frieze depicting him on horseback that had adorned the side of the building was removed amid protests in 2006. A significant push to change its name failed on February 16, 2018, when the governor-controlled Tennessee Historical Commission denied Middle Tennessee State University's petition to rename Forrest Hall.

== Forrest monument in Old Live Oak Cemetery, Selma, Alabama ==
In 2000, a monument to Forrest was unveiled in Selma, Alabama. The monument to Forrest in the Confederate Circle section of Old Live Oak Cemetery in Selma, Alabama, reads "Defender of Selma, Wizard of the Saddle, Untutored Genius, The first with the most. This monument stands as testament of our perpetual devotion and respect for Lieutenant General Nathan Bedford Forrest. CSA 1821–1877, one of the South's finest heroes. In honor of Gen. Forrest's unwavering defense of Selma, the great state of Alabama, and the Confederacy, this memorial is dedicated. DEO VINDICE". The bust of Forrest was stolen from the cemetery monument in March 2012 and replaced in May 2015.

== Nathan Bedford Forrest Day ==
In 1971, the Tennessee legislature established July 13 as "Nathan Bedford Forrest Day". As of 2019, Nathan Bedford Forrest Day was still observed in Tennessee, though some Democrats in the state had attempted to change the law, which required Tennessee's governor to sign a proclamation honoring the holiday. However, since that time, Governor Bill Lee's administration introduced a bill—passed by the Tennessee legislature on June 10, 2020—which released the governor from the former requirement that he proclaim that observance each year and a spokesperson for Governor Lee confirmed that he would not be signing a Forrest Day proclamation in July 2020. In June 2020, after black members of the Tennessee House of Representatives unsuccessfully asked it to eliminate a state celebration of Forrest, Representative Cameron Sexton opined: "I don't think anybody here is truly racist. I think people may make insensitive comments."

== Nathan Bedford Forrest bust ==
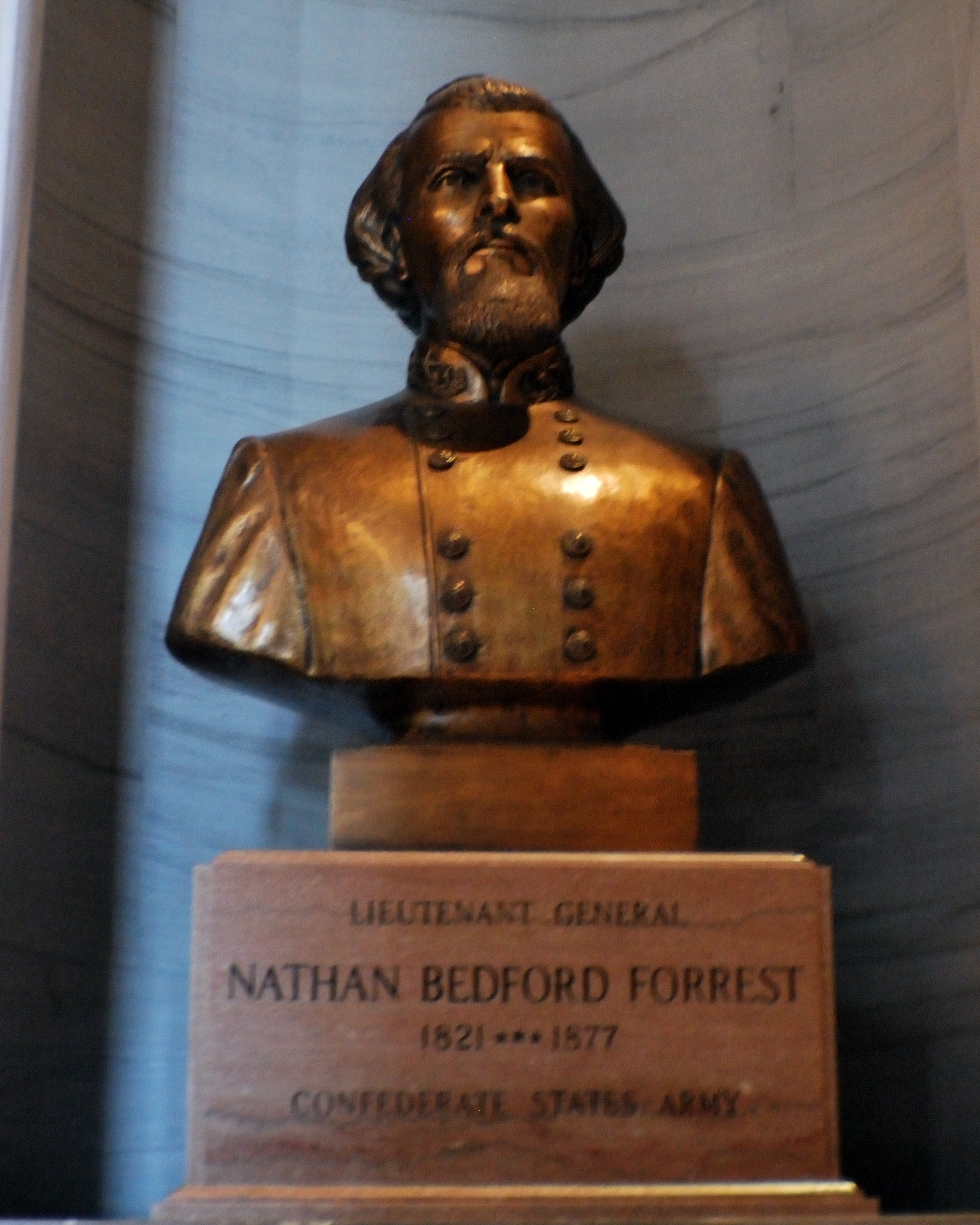
Tennessee State Capitol bust

A bust sculpted by Jane Baxendale had been on display at the Tennessee State Capitol building in Nashville since 1978. Brett Joseph Forrest, a direct descendant of Nathan, spoke in support of the bust's removal. In 2021 Sexton voted against the removal of the bust of Forrest from the Tennessee State Capitol and into the Tennessee State Museum, but only one other legislator agreed with him, and the bust was removed. Sexton said that he believed "Trying to judge past generations' actions based on today's values and the evolution of societies is not an exercise I am willing to do because I think it is counterproductive."

== Street names ==
- In August 2000, a road on Fort Bliss named for Forrest decades earlier was renamed for former post commander Richard T. Cassidy.
- In 2023, Forrest Street in Alexandria, Virginia, named after Forrest has been proposed by local legislators for renaming.

== Mississippi license-plate plan ==
A 2011 proposal by the Sons of Confederate Veterans to honor Forrest with a Mississippi license plate revived tensions and raised objections from Mississippi NAACP chapter president Derrick Johnson, who compared Forrest to Osama bin Laden and Saddam Hussein. The Mississippi NAACP petitioned Governor Haley Barbour to denounce the plates and prevent their distribution. Barbour refused to denounce the honor. Instead, he noted that the state legislature would not likely approve the plate anyway.

== Other monuments and memorials ==
- Obelisks in his memory were placed at his birthplace in Chapel Hill, Tennessee, and at Nathan Bedford Forrest State Park near Camden.
- The World War II Army base Camp Forrest in Tullahoma, Tennessee, was named after him. It is now the site of the Arnold Engineering Development Center.

== See also ==
- Removal of Confederate monuments and memorials
- List of monument and memorial controversies in the United States
