= Tennessee House of Representatives 33rd district =

State legislative district in Tennessee

Tennessee's 33rd State House of Representatives district
- Map of Tennessee House districts with the 33rd District shaded in red
Representative
Rick Scarbrough; R–Oak Ridge
since 2025
- Demographics: 85.3% White; 3.8% Black; 4.3% Hispanic; 1.6% Asian; 4.1% Multiracial
- Population (2024): 68,646

The Tennessee House of Representatives 33rd district is one of the 99 legislative districts in the lower house of the Tennessee General Assembly. The district is located in East Tennessee and covers most of Anderson County. The district includes most of Oak Ridge, as well as Clinton, Oliver Springs, and Rocky Top. Rick Scarbrough has represented the district since 2025.

== Demographics ==
The Tennessee Comptroller estimates the population as of 2024 at 68,646.

- 85.3% of the district is White
- 4.3% of the district is Hispanic
- 3.8% of the district is Black
- 1.6% of the district is Asian
- 4.1% of the district is Two or more races

Detailed demographic information is also available through Census Reporter.

== History ==
The 88th Tennessee General Assembly was the first in which all districts were numbered. At this time, the 33rd district was in Anderson and Roane counties. At the 93rd GA, it was part of Anderson, Campbell, and Roane counties. Since the 94th General Assembly, it has been part of Anderson County.

== List of Representatives ==
Representative	Party	Years of Service	General Assembly	Hometown
Rick Scarbrough	Republican	2025-present	114th	Oak Ridge
John Ragan	Republican	2011-2024	107th-113th	Oak Ridge
Jim Hackworth	Democratic	2003-2010	103rd-106th	Clinton
Gene Caldwell	Democratic	1997-2002	100th-102nd	Clinton
David L. Coffey	Republican	1987-1996	95th-99th	Oak Ridge
Randy McNally	Republican	1979-1986	91st-94th	Oak Ridge
A. Keith Bissell	Democratic	1971-1978	87th-90th	Oak Ridge
