= Jack Kershaw =

American attorney (1913–2010)

- Kershaw in 1977
- Born: John Karl Kershaw; October 12, 1913; Missouri, U.S.
- Died: September 7, 2010 (aged 96); Nashville, Tennessee, U.S.
- Education: Vanderbilt University; Nashville School of Law
- Occupation: Lawyer
- Known for: Martin Luther King Jr. assassination conspiracy theories
- Spouse: Mary Noel

John Karl Kershaw (October 12, 1913 – September 7, 2010) was an American attorney best known for challenging the official account of the assassination of Martin Luther King, Jr. in 1968, claiming that his client James Earl Ray was an unwitting participant in a ploy devised by a mystery man named Raul to kill the civil rights leader.

Kershaw was also a member of The General Joseph E. Johnston Camp 28 Sons of Confederate Veterans and a Southern secessionist and segregationist who helped found the League of the South. In 1998, Kershaw sculpted a Nathan Bedford Forrest Statue that has drawn wide criticism and mockery by national media.

== Early life ==
Kershaw was born on October 12, 1913, in Missouri. He moved to the Old Hickory section of Nashville, Tennessee with his family in his youth. He attended Vanderbilt University, where he played on the school football team and graduated with a degree in geology. He was awarded a law degree at the Nashville Y.M.C.A. Night Law School, now known as Nashville School of Law.

== James Earl Ray case ==
Starting in 1977, Kershaw represented James Earl Ray, who had been sentenced to 99 years in prison for his role in the assassination of Dr. Martin Luther King, Jr. Charged with firing the shot that killed Dr. King on April 4, 1968, at the Lorraine Motel in Memphis, Tennessee, Ray had pleaded guilty to the crime in 1969 at the suggestion of his attorney Percy Foreman; Ray would have faced an automatic death sentence had he been convicted of the assassination by a Tennessee state court. Ray claimed that he had been coerced into entering a plea, and Kershaw helped his client push the claim that Ray was not responsible for the shooting, which was said to have been the result of a conspiracy of an otherwise unidentified man named "Raul" whom Ray had met in Montreal. With the claim that he was "partially responsible without knowing it" as part of what Ray "thought was a gun-smuggling operation", Kershaw and his client met with representatives of the United States House Select Committee on Assassinations and convinced the committee to run ballistics tests — which ultimately proved inconclusive — that would show that Ray had not fired the fatal shot.

Ray was one of a group of five inmates who escaped from Brushy Mountain State Penitentiary in June 1977, which Kershaw claimed was additional proof that Ray had been involved in a conspiracy that had provided him with the outside assistance he would have needed to break out of jail. Kershaw convinced Ray to take a polygraph test as part of an interview with Playboy. The magazine said that the test results showed "that Ray did, in fact, kill Martin Luther King Jr., and that he did so alone". Ray fired Kershaw after discovering that the attorney had been paid $11,000 by the magazine in exchange for the interview, and hired conspiracy theorist Mark Lane to provide him with legal representation. Ray died in prison in 1998.

== Secessionist and segregationist ==
In 1994, Kershaw was one of the founders of the League of the South, a group that supports Southern secession. He remained a board member until 2009. He was also a past chairman of the League's Cultural and Educational Foundation. Kershaw was previously active in the Nashville chapter of the White Citizens' Council and the Tennessee Federation for Constitutional Government, both segregationist groups.

== Outdoor sculpture ==
Kershaw sculpted the Nathan Bedford Forrest Statue, an equestrian monument to Nathan Bedford Forrest, the Confederate Army general and Grand Wizard of the Ku Klux Klan, which was unveiled to the public in July 1998. The Nathan Bedford Forrest Equestrian Statue project was sponsored by the Southern League, the Mary Noel Kershaw Foundation, and all interested chapters of Sons of Confederate Veterans and United Daughters of the Confederacy.

The Nathan Bedford Statue has been widely mocked by national media and local political leaders have tried to hide it. The 25-foot-high statue was constructed on an area between two cell phone towers on private land facing Interstate 65 and was accompanied by an array of 13 Confederate battle flags and was lit up at night. Kershaw justified the memorial by saying, "Somebody needs to say a good word for slavery". Kershaw also created a similarly large statue of Joan of Arc.

== Personal life, death and legacy ==
Kershaw married Mary Noel, a Vanderbilt graduate and attorney whose ancestors were the founders of the Downtown Presbyterian Church. She predeceased him in 1989, and she was buried at Mount Olivet Cemetery. The Southern Poverty Law Center lists the Mary Noel Kershaw Foundation as a Neo-Confederate organization based in Lobelville, Tennessee on their hate map; it "funds firearms self-defense training for the League of the South."

Kershaw died at age 96 on September 7, 2010, in Nashville. He left no other immediate survivors. In a post following his death to the "Hatewatch" website of the Southern Poverty Law Center, Kershaw was called "one of the most iconic American white segregationists of the 20th century".
