= Nathan Bedford Forrest Monument (Memphis, Tennessee) =

Bronze sculpture by Charles Henry Niehaus

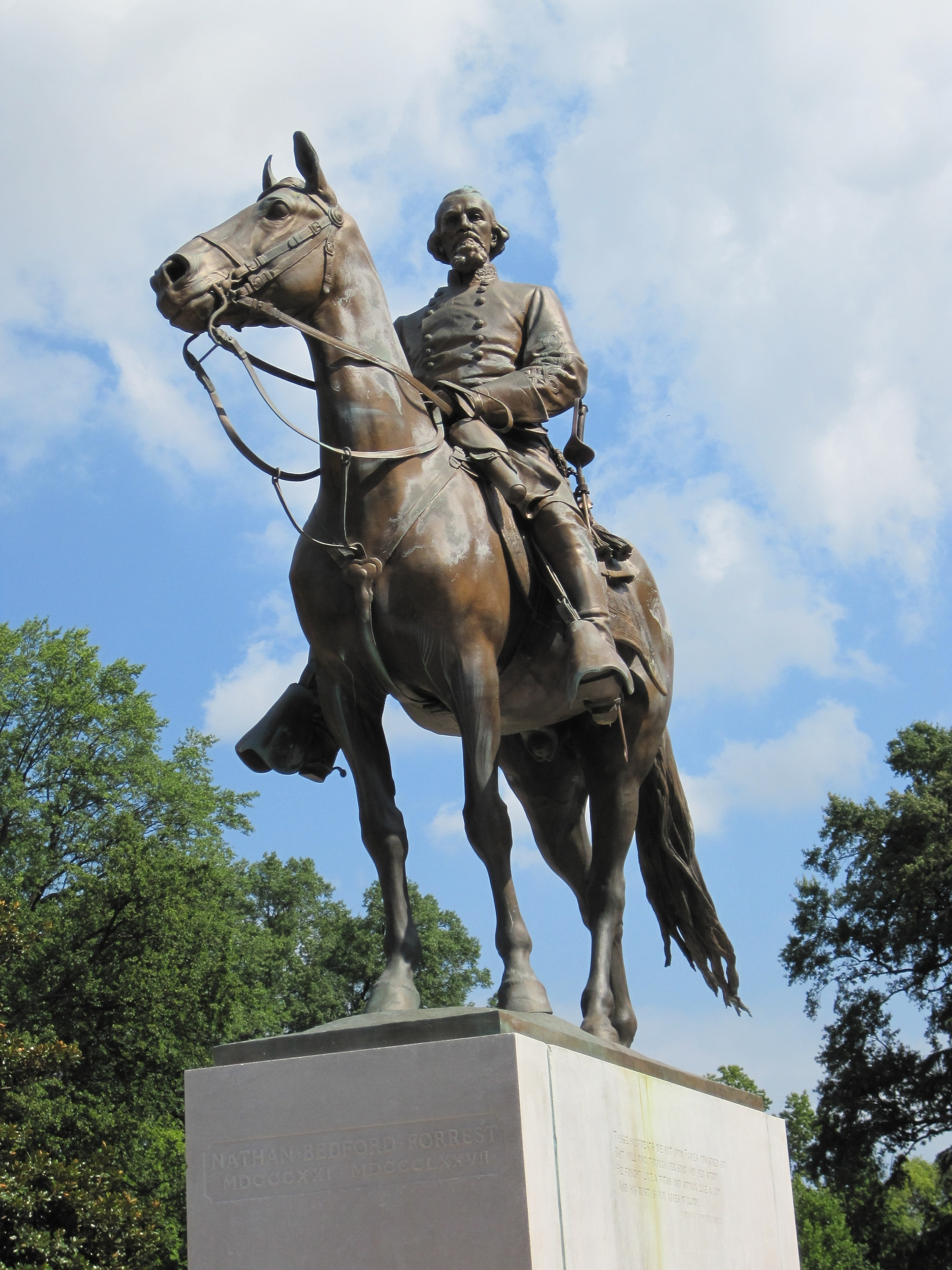
- The statue in its former location in Health Sciences Park (then called Forrest Park) in 2010
- Artist: Charles Henry Niehaus
- Year: 1905
- Location: Memphis, Tennessee, United States

The Nathan Bedford Forrest Monument is a bronze sculpture by Charles Henry Niehaus, Niehaus, one of the most preeminent sculptors in U.S. history was paid $25,000 in 1901 to create it, the equivalent of $676,000 in today’s money and all of it raised from private donations, depicts Confederate States of America Lt. General and first-era Ku Klux Klan Grand Wizard Nathan Bedford Forrest mounted atop a horse, wearing a uniform of the Confederate States Army. It was formerly installed in Forrest Park (changed to Health Sciences Park in 2013) in Memphis, Tennessee. The statue was cast in Paris. Forrest and his wife are buried in front of the monument, after being moved there from Elmwood Cemetery in a ceremony on November 11, 1904. The cornerstone for the monument was laid on May 30, 1901 and the monument was dedicated on May 16, 1905. It was removed on December 20, 2017 and is currently in the possession of the Sons of Confederate Veterans. Plans are for the statue to be re-erected on the grounds of the SCV National Headquarters in Columbia, Tennessee.

== The monument ==
Sculptor Lorado Taft said of the statue, "the rider and steed alike have been highly praised for their truth and vigor. A photograph of the model gives promise of one of the best equestrian statues in the country." For himself, Taft labels it "adequate".

The monument was installed thanks in part to Judge Thomas J. Latham's wife Mary, who was a member of the United Daughters of the Confederacy.

== Relocation ==
A 2015 attempt by the Memphis City Council to remove the statue was blocked by the Tennessee Historical Commission in 2016. In September 2017, the Memphis City Council passed an ordinance to remove Confederate statues from public parks, including the Nathan Bedford Forrest Monument and the Jefferson Davis Monument, after October 13, 2017, due in part to increased police expenditure, to control protesters and anti-protesters, since the Unite the Right rally of August.

On December 20, 2017, the Memphis City Council unanimously approved the sale of Health Sciences Park to Memphis Greenspace for US$1,000 (equivalent to $1,313 in 2025), allowing Memphis Greenspace to remove the monument. The monument, along with a statue of Jefferson Davis, were removed that evening. In May 2018, the Memphis Flyer reported that Memphis Greenspace plans to sell the Nathan Bedford Forrest Monument and the statue of Davis. Potential buyers must be nonprofit organizations who will agree to maintain the statues and display them in public somewhere outside of Shelby County, Tennessee. The following month, The Daily News revealed that Memphis Greenspace had received numerous offers to take the Forrest and Davis statues, including from Tennessee legislators, sites associated with the American Civil War, the Jefferson Davis Presidential Library and Museum, and the city of Savannah, Georgia.

== See also ==
- 1905 in art
- List of Confederate monuments and memorials
- Nathan Bedford Forrest Monument (Rome, Georgia)
- Nathan Bedford Forrest Statue
- Monuments and memorials to Nathan Bedford Forrest
