= Thomas J. Latham =

American politician (1831–1911)

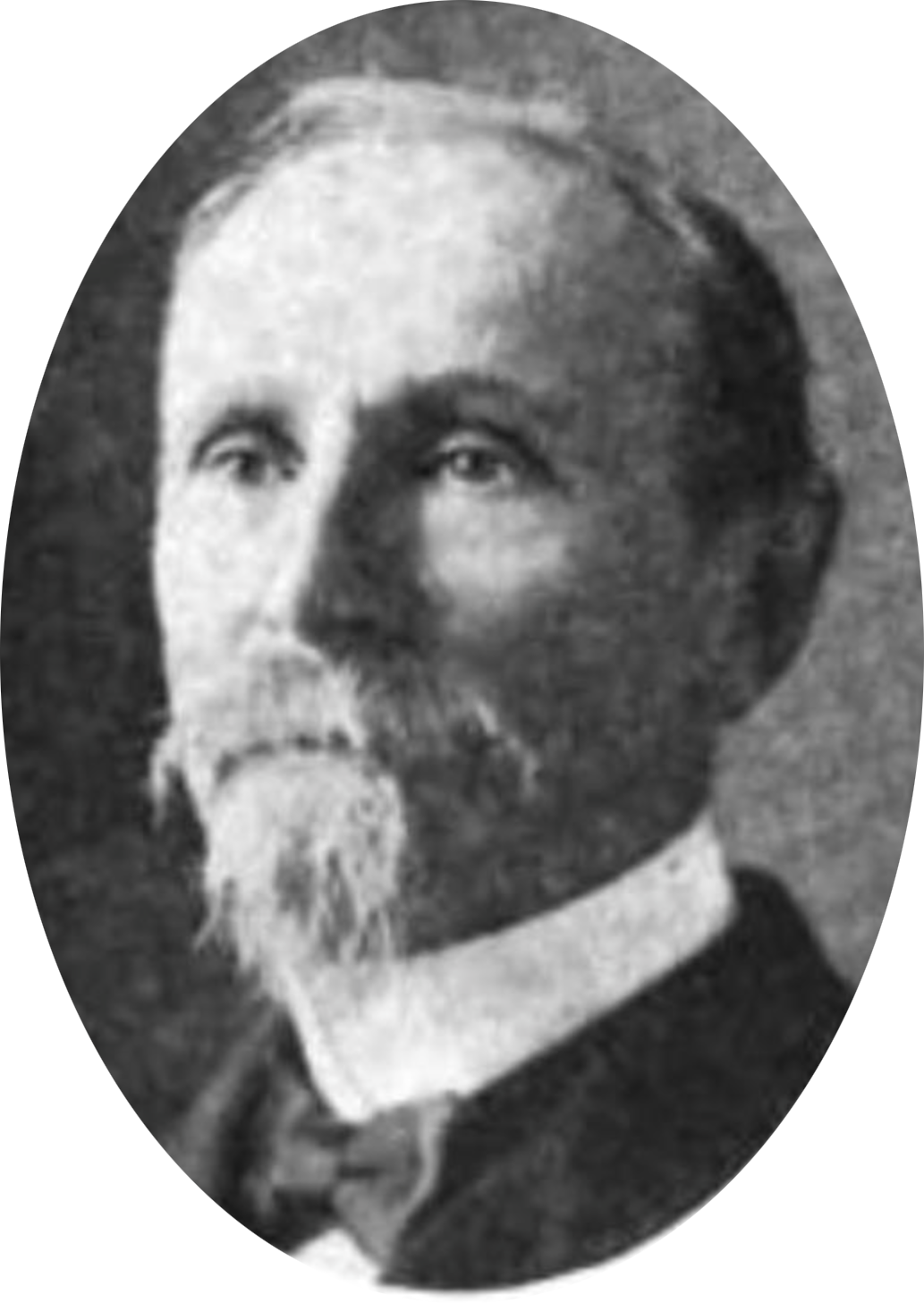
- Born: November 22, 1831; Washington, North Carolina, U.S.
- Died: July 24, 1911 (aged 79); Memphis, Tennessee, U.S.
- Resting place: Elmwood Cemetery
- Education: Western Military Institute
- Occupations: Lawyer, businessman
- Spouse: Mary H. Wooldridge

Judge Thomas Jefferson Latham (November 22, 1831 – July 24, 1911) was an American lawyer and businessman. Growing up in rural Weakley County, Tennessee, in the Antebellum South, he became a lawyer and remained neutral during the American Civil War. In the post-bellum era, he served as the debt receiver of the City of Memphis, Tennessee, and the president of the Memphis Water Company. He was an investor in land development in Tennessee and coal mining in Alabama. By the time of his death, he was a millionaire.

== Early life ==
Thomas Jefferson Latham was born on November 22, 1831, in Washington, North Carolina. He moved to Tennessee with his parents in 1833.

Latham graduated from the Western Military Institute in Georgetown, Kentucky, in 1852. While he was at the institute, James G. Blaine was one of his professors. Latham proceeded to study the law in Dresden, Tennessee. He was admitted to the bar in 1857.

== Career ==
Latham started his career as a lawyer in the late 1850s. He was elected as a representative for Weakley County, Tennessee, siding with the Whig Party. Latham was opposed to secession, but he did not support the actions of the Union Army during the American Civil War. After the war, he was opposed to disenfranchisement.

Latham resumed his legal practice in Memphis, Tennessee, from 1866 to 1868. In January 1868, he was appointed by Chief Justice Salmon P. Chase as "register of the United States district court in bankruptcy" for Memphis. In 1879, he was appointed by Judge John Baxter as debt receiver of the City of Memphis.

Latham acquired the bankrupt Memphis Water Company for US$155,000 in 1880. He served as its president until 1903. Additionally, he served as the president of the Chickasaw Land Company and the New South Coal and Mining Company of Alabama. He also served on the Boards of Directors of the South Memphis Land Company and the Memphis National Bank.

Latham served as the president of the Tennessee Industrial School, a public school for orphans and destitute children. He was appointed vice president for West Tennessee of the Tennessee Historical Society in 1903.

== Personal life ==
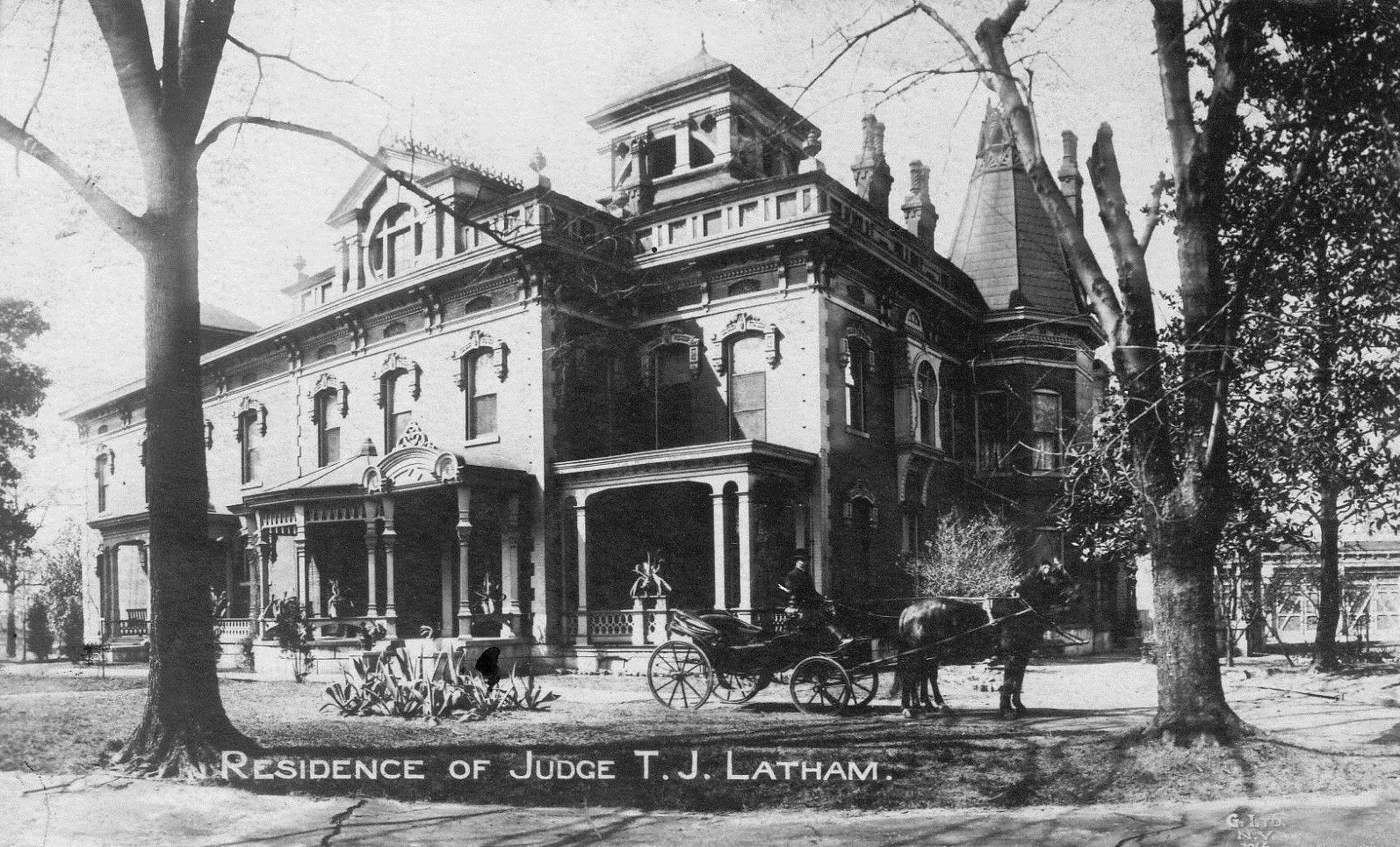
The Judge T. J. Latham Residence in Memphis, Tennessee, circa 1910

Latham married Mary Helen Wooldridge in 1861. The couple resided in Memphis, Tennessee. Latham attended the Linden Street Christian Church.

Latham's wife was a member of the Daughters of the American Revolution and the United Daughters of the Confederacy. She was critical in the erection of the Nathan Bedford Forrest Monument in Memphis. Additionally, according to Francesca Morgan, an associate professor of history at Northeastern Illinois University, Mary Latham's leadership position within the U.D.C. gave her an opportunity to anticipate Mary Ritter Beard's feminism as she "celebrated married women's property rights, white women's admission to state universities, women's establishment of "industrial and reform schools" for girls, and their community work that resulted in public libraries, public drinking fountains for man and beast, police matrons, public parks, and clean streets"."

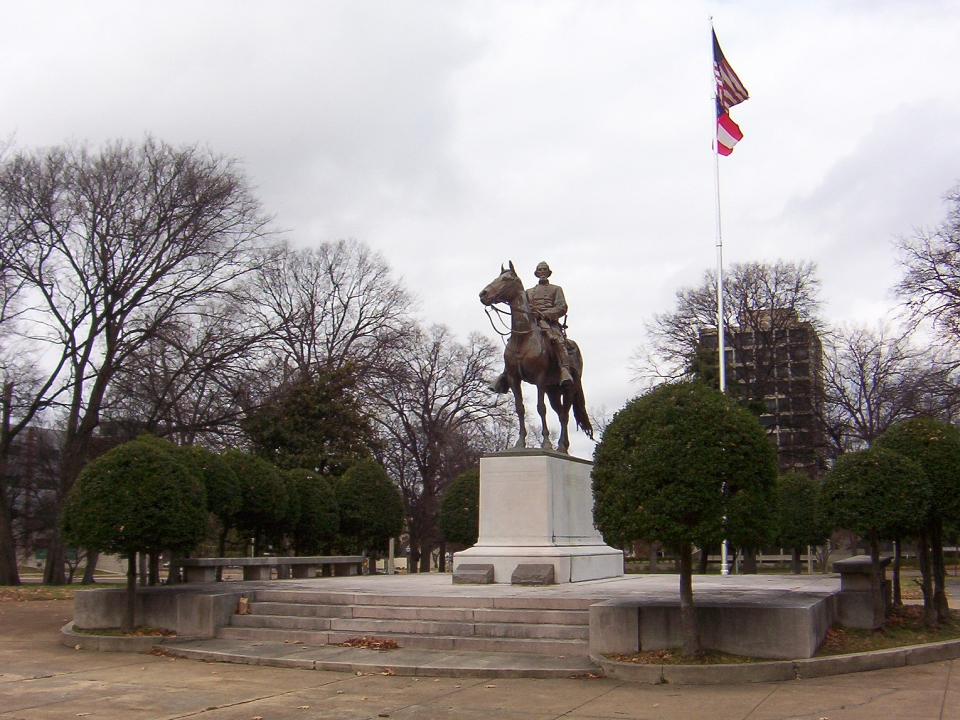
The Nathan Bedford Forrest Monument in Memphis

== Death and legacy ==
Latham died on July 24, 1911, in Memphis, Tennessee. He was buried at the Elmwood Cemetery. By the time of his death, he was worth an estimated US$1 million.

The Memphis chapter of the United Daughters of the Confederacy was named the Mary Latham Chapter, in honor of his wife.
