= Western Military Institute =

Defunct college in Kentucky and Tennessee, US

Coordinates: 36.1402°N 86.7990°W

The Western Military Institute was a preparatory school and college located first in Kentucky, then in Tennessee. It was founded in 1847 in Georgetown, Kentucky, and it later moved to Nashville, Tennessee, where it merged with Montgomery Bell Academy in 1867. The former campus is now Vanderbilt University's Peabody College. Alumni include prominent Confederate veterans and Southern politicians.

== History ==
The Western Military Institute was founded by Thornton Fitzhugh Johnson in 1847, and initially located in Georgetown, Kentucky.

Future Republican politician, Speaker of the United States House of Representatives, and Presidential Candidate James Blaine was an instructor there in 1850 and 1851. In 1851, future Confederate General Bushrod Johnson became a professor, and later served as headmaster until the beginning of the American Civil War.

In 1855, the Western Military Institute merged with the University of Nashville, and the campus was moved to that city. The combined school offered university and high school instruction to young men, the latter continuing to operate under the name Western Military Institute, though the controlling organization in the merger was the University of Nashville. Sam Davis, "Boy Hero of the Confederacy", attended the Western Military Institute from 1860 to 1861. The campus was located from 1855 to 1861 at 724 Second Avenue South, which serves today as Metropolitan Nashville City Government's Planning Building, home to the Nashville Planning Commission. It closed in 1862, during the American Civil War.

In 1867 the high school instruction of the University of Nashville, previously offered through the Western Military Institute was offered in the newly constituted Montgomery Bell Academy, which was housed in new facilities that are now the campus of the George Peabody College of Teachers at Vanderbilt University.

== Notable alumni ==
- William Behan, Confederate veteran and Mayor of New Orleans.
- Hampton J. Cheney, Confederate veteran and Tennessee State Senator.
- Sam Davis, "Boy Hero of the Confederacy".
- Charles Erasmus Fenner, Confederate veteran and Louisiana Supreme Court Justice
- Thomas J. Latham, bankruptcy judge and businessman in Memphis, Tennessee.
- John W. Morton, Tennessee Secretary of State from 1901 to 1909.
- Robert C. Newton, Confederate veteran, Member of the Arkansas House of Representatives and Treasurer of Arkansas
- Joseph Toole – first and fourth Governor of Montana
