= Rick Scarbrough =

American politician (born 1965)

Member of the Tennessee House of Representatives from the 33rd district
- Incumbent
- Assumed office January 14, 2025
- Preceded by: John Ragan

Personal details
- Born: May 21, 1965 (age 61)
- Party: Republican
- Children: 2
- Education: Tusculum University

Rick Scarbrough (born May 21, 1965) is an American politician and former law enforcement officer who is a Republican member of the Tennessee House of Representatives, representing the 33rd district. He was first elected in the 2024 Tennessee House of Representatives election. He defeated incumbent John Ragan in the primary and won the general election in November against Democratic nominee Anne Backus. The district is based in Anderson County and includes the communities of Oak Ridge, Oliver Springs, and Clinton.

== Personal life and education ==
Scarbrough lives in Oak Ridge. A former law enforcement officer, he served 29 years as an officer in both the Clinton Police Department and Anderson County Sheriff's Office. He was the Chief of Police for the Clinton Police Department for 16 years. He is Baptist. He has a bachelor and master degree from Tusculum University in Organizational Management.

== Political views ==
=== Racketeering ===
Scarbrough introduced legislation in March 2025 to increase the amount of offenses that can be charged under racketeering.

=== School vouchers ===
Scarbrough stated in January 2025 that he opposes universal school vouchers.
