= Hampton J. Cheney =

American politician

- Born: June 2, 1836; Rapides Parish, Louisiana, U.S.
- Died: September 12, 1927 (aged 91); Nashville, Tennessee, U.S.
- Education: Western Military Institute
- Occupation: Politician
- Spouse: Amanda E. Stratton
- Children: 1 daughter
- Parent: Hampton J. Cheney

Hampton J. Cheney (1836–1927) was an American Confederate soldier and politician. He served as a member of the Tennessee Senate.

== Early life ==
Hampton J. Cheney was born on June 2, 1836, in Rapides Parish, Louisiana. He graduated from the Western Military Institute in 1858.

== Career ==
Cheney became a farmer. During the American Civil War of 1861–1865, he served as adjutant under General John C. Brown in the Confederate States Army.

Cheney served as assistant postmaster of Nashville from 1888 to 1892. He served as a member of the Tennessee Senate in 1892. He served as the City Comptroller of Nashville from 1898 to 1906.

== Personal life and death ==
Cheney married Amanda E. Stratton, the daughter of Colonel Madison Stratton, in 1858. They had a daughter, Leonora. He was a member of the Improved Order of Red Men, the Fraternal Order of Eagles and the Knights of Pythias. He was also a member of the United Confederate Veterans.

Cheney died on September 12, 1927, in Nashville, Tennessee. His portrait is displayed at the Tennessee State Museum.
