= John Ragan =

American politician (born 1948)

John D. Ragan, Jr.
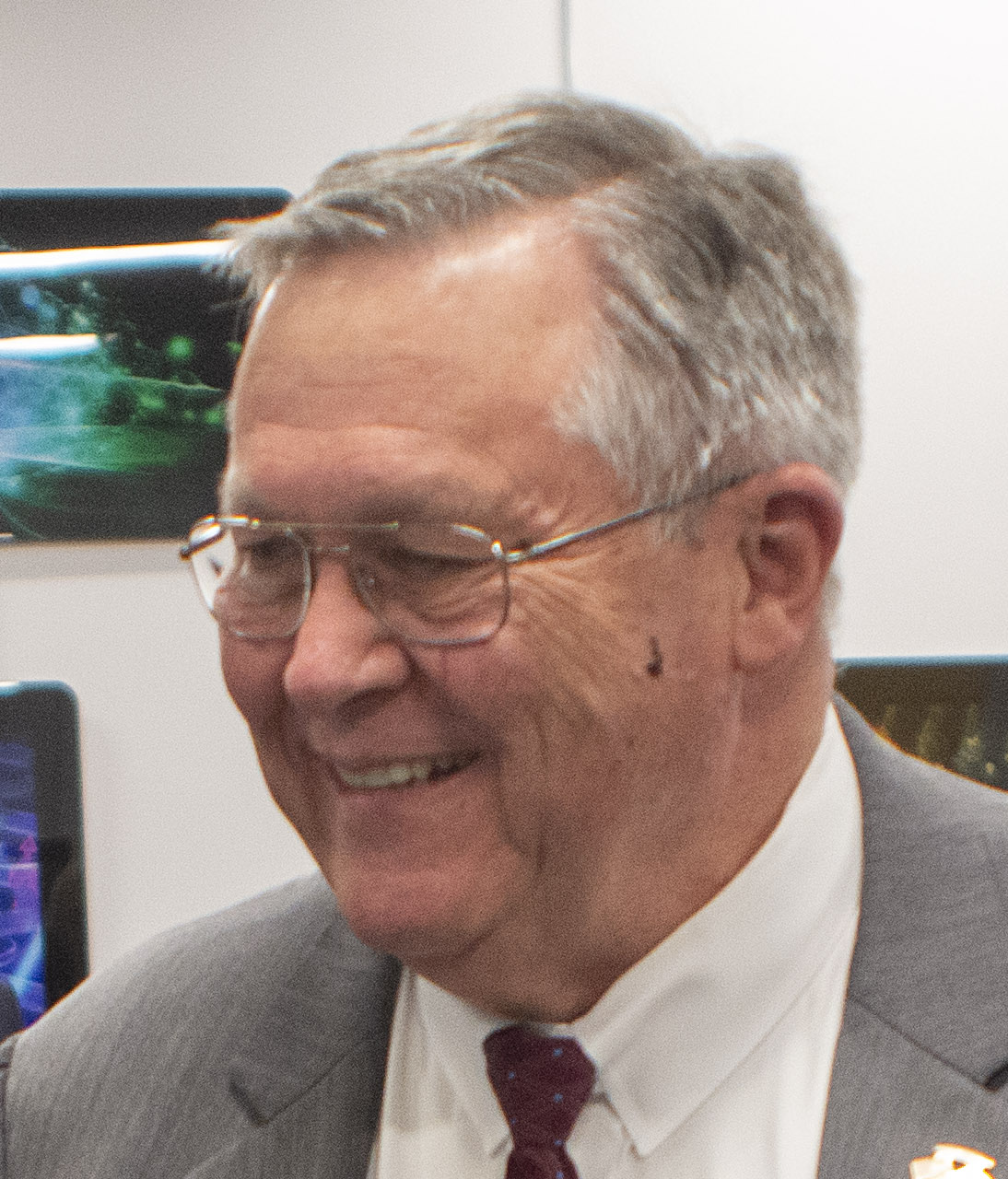
- Ragan in 2018

Member of the Tennessee House of Representatives from the 33rd district
- In office January 11, 2011 – January 14, 2025
- Preceded by: Jim Hackworth
- Succeeded by: Rick Scarbrough

Personal details
- Born: December 16, 1948 (age 77)
- Party: Republican
- Education: United States Air Force Academy
- Occupation: Business consultant

John D. Ragan Jr. (born December 16, 1948) is an American politician. A Republican, he represented District 33 (encompassing parts of Anderson County) in the Tennessee House of Representatives from 2011 to 2025.

== Biography ==
=== Early life ===
John D. Ragan Jr. was born on December 16, 1948, in Morganton, North Carolina.

Ragan attended the University of North Carolina, the University of Oklahoma, University of Southern California, and the University of Tennessee.

Ragan graduated with the United States Air Force Academy Class of 1971 earning a 2.8 GPA toward his completion of a baccalaureate degree in Engineering Science. Ragan later earned a master's degree in Aeronautical Sciences from Embry–Riddle Aeronautical University. He also attended the University of Tennessee as a post-graduate student and the University of Oklahoma, the University of Southern California, and the University of North Carolina in professional capacities.

=== Career ===
Ragan served as a commissioned officer for 24 years, as an Air Force pilot. He has worked as a business consultant; his 2010 campaign website stated that he had consulted with 27 businesses, a number of which are on the Fortune 100 list.

Ragan was issued a Commercial Pilot certificate by the U.S. Federal Aviation Administration on May 19, 1990, while he was a resident of Statesville, North Carolina.

Ragan has also worked as a substitute teacher with local school systems.

=== Tennessee House of Representatives ===
In 2010, Ragan was first elected as State Representative to the General Assembly for the 33rd district, formerly represented by Jim Hackworth. His campaign focused on education, illegal immigration, and the economy. In 2010, he said, based upon academic studies by Vanderbilt University and other sources, that there wasn't sufficient evidence that public funding for early childhood education was needed. A year later, he voted to overturn teacher union collective bargaining rights but supported collaborative bargaining.

Subsequently, he won re-election in 2012, 2014, 2016, 2018, 2020, and 2022. In 2012 his Democratic Party opponent was Jim Hackworth, the former incumbent he had defeated in 2010. Ragan won re-election with 51% of the vote. In 2014, he was opposed by Caitlin Nolan in the Republican primary, which Ragan won with nearly 55% of the vote. The Democratic candidate who had qualified withdrew, so Ragan was unopposed in the general election. In 2016 he won with 66% of the vote over Democratic candidate Michael S. McKamey. In 2018, Richard Dawson was the Democratic candidate, and Ragan won with 61% of the vote. In 2020, Ragan was unopposed in both the Republican primary and the general election. Ragan won re-election again in 2022, receiving nearly 62% of the vote over Democratic challenger Jim Dodson.

In the 110th Tennessee General Assembly (2017-2018) Ragan served as Vice Chair of the House Government Operations Committee, Vice Chair of the Joint Subcommittee on Education, Health and General Welfare, member of the House Health Committee and Subcommittee, Co-Chair of the National Conference of State Legislatures Nuclear Legislative Working Group, Member of the House Health Subcommittee and main Committee, Member of Southern States Energy Board. In 2018 he provided a written statement to the Nuclear Regulatory Commission supporting the siting of a small modular nuclear reactor on the Oak Ridge Federal Reservation.

As a member of the Tennessee General Assembly, Ragan sponsored bills to bar the issuance of Tennessee marriage licenses to same-sex couples and advocated for parents to be referred to the Tennessee Department of Children for a child abuse investigation if their child accumulates school lunch debt.

In 2023, Ragan supported a resolution to expel three Democratic lawmakers from the legislature for violating decorum rules. The expulsion was widely characterized as unprecedented.

In a Republican primary election on August 1, 2024, Ragan lost re-nomination to former Clinton police chief Rick Scarbrough by 258 votes. Some observers attributed his loss to many of Ragan's unpopular educational positions, including his support for increasing private school vouchers in the state.

Ragan challenged the results, saying that Democrats crossed over to vote in the Republican primary to help defeat him. The Republican Party State Executive Committee denied his challenge by a vote of 41-7.

==== 2017 ====
In 2017 Ragan was the Tennessee House of Representatives sponsor of a bill that would require Tennessee driver's licenses and IDs for non-citizens of the U.S. who lack permanent residency status to prominently feature the words “alien” or “non-permanent resident” in capital letters.

==== 2020 ====
On June 9, 2020, Ragan voted as a member of the House Naming, Designating, & Private Acts Committee against removing a bust in the Tennessee State Capitol honoring Confederate General and Ku Klux Klan Grand Wizard Nathan Bedford Forrest from the Tennessee State Capitol building Ragan reportedly responded to a constituent's email query questioning his support for honoring Forrest by keeping his bust on display by sending the constituent a copy of an opinion column (Tucker, Greg (July 11, 2015). "Remembering Rutherford: Forrest was postwar activist for black civil rights". The Daily News Journal. Murfreesboro, Tennessee.) published in a Middle Tennessee newspaper and based in part on Sons of Confederate Veterans information, claiming that "Retired Confederate Gen. Nathan Bedford Forrest" (Note: This is not an accurate description; Forrest did not "retire" from the Confederate States Army, but was rather a defeated Confederate military commander at the end of the U.S. Civil War) was not actually a founder of the Ku Klux Klan, but was "an outspoken advocate for the civil rights of the freedmen in postwar Tennessee" late in his life.

==== 2021 ====
In May 2021, at the end of the legislative session, Ragan introduced an amendment to an education bill to prohibit public and charter schools in Tennessee from "teaching that:

- "One race or sex is superior;
- "Any individuals are "inherently privileged, racist, sexist, or oppressive" because of their race or sex;
- "A person should receive adverse treatment due to their race or sex;
- Their moral character is determined by race or sex;
- "A person bears responsibility for past actions by other members of their race or sex;
- "A person should feel discomfort or other psychological distress because of their race or sex;
- "A meritocracy is racist or sexist or designed to oppress members of another race or sex;
- "The United States is fundamentally racist or sexist;
- "Promoting the violent overthrow of the U.S. government;
- "Promoting division or resentment between race, sex, religion, creed, nonviolent political affiliation, or class;
- "Ascribing character traits, values, moral codes, privileges or beliefs to a race;
- "The rule of law does not exist, but instead is a series of power relationships and struggles among racial or other groups;
- "Americans are not created equal and are not endowed by their Creator with certain unalienable rights, including, life, liberty, and the pursuit of happiness; or
- "Governments should deny to any person within the government's jurisdiction the equal protection of the law."

His proposal, which was described as a ban on teaching critical race theory and has also been called the "prohibited concepts" law, was quickly adopted by the General Assembly, which was controlled by a Republican supermajority. The bill was later signed into law by Governor Bill Lee, becoming (with minor revisions) a new section in Tennessee Code Annotated, Title 49, Chapter 6, Part 10.

In July 2023 the Tennessee Education Association (an affiliate of the National Education Association) and several individual K-12 teachers filed a federal lawsuit seeking to invalidate the "disputed concepts" law, alleging that in its vagueness the law violates the 14th Amendment to the U.S. Constitution, which requires that laws give sufficient notice of the conduct they purport to prohibit. Critics of the law noted that it is impossible to teach about topics such as slavery and Jim Crow laws without discussing concepts of racial superiority. Teachers expressed concern that a single complaint by a parent could expose a teacher to months of administrative proceedings, possibly leading to loss of their jobs and teaching licenses, and that fear of this had led some teachers and schools to stop teaching about "uncomfortable" historical facts. As an example, the legal complaint noted that, due to the law, one school had replaced its annual field trip to the National Civil Rights Museum in Memphis with a trip to a baseball game. Ragan has defended the language of the law, acknowledging that slavery was abhorrent but advising that teachers should avoid stating "personal opinion" on the topic. When asked how a teacher could provide "balance" in a discussion of the Holocaust or 9/11, he suggested that teachers could say that the perpetrators of these events were created "in the image and likeness of God."

==== Opposition to accommodations for LGBTQ persons ====
John Ragan receives attention for his leadership in promoting measures to prevent government, schools, and businesses from identifying transgender persons and other LGBTQ persons as a protected class or providing accommodations. He denies the concept that people can be transgender, stating in 2020 that "The idea that we can defy reality by saying we think this is the way it is or we feel this is the way it is, is an absurdity." LGBTQ advocates have decried legislative proposals that he sponsored, together with related measures introduced by his legislative colleagues, as a "Slate of Hate." In 2019, over 100 clergy from across Tennessee signed a statement opposing the six bills identified that year as the "Slate of Hate.

In 2019 he introduced a bill to expand the definition of "public places" in law related to the crime of indecent exposure, so that it would apply to "incidents occurring in a restroom, locker room, dressing room, or shower, designated for single-sex, multi-person use, if the offender is a member of the opposite sex than the sex designated for use." A provision of the bill stated that psychiatric diagnosis of "gender dysphoria (or) gender confusion" could not be a defense against criminal charges. The bill passed both houses of the legislature after revisions. Explaining his reasons for the bill, Ragan told a reporter that he was concerned that his granddaughters might see male genitalia in a public restroom, and said "I don't care if they think they're a woman."

In 2020, Ragan and State Senator Janice Bowling were co-sponsors of a bill that, as described in media reports, would largely ban puberty-blocking and gender-affirming medical treatments for persons under age 18 and establish criminal penalties for medical providers and parents who enabled children to receive treatments in violation of the law's restrictions. He introduced a similar bill in the 2021 legislative session.

Also in 2020, Ragan was the House sponsor for a bill to authorize adoption agencies to refuse to provide adoption services under circumstances that would conflict with the agency's "sincerely held religious beliefs" and to bar state or local government from taking "adverse action" against any agency that denied services based on such beliefs. The measure passed both houses of the legislature and was signed into law. It was widely understood to be intended to allow agencies to deny services to same-sex couples and LGBT individuals seeking to adopt. The first legal challenge to the law came, however, from a heterosexual Jewish couple who were unable to receive state-mandated foster-parent training and home-study certification from a Christian-affiliated adoption agency that received government funding to provide these services in their local area.

In the 2022 legislative session Ragan was the House sponsor for a bill to withhold state education funding from K-12 public schools that allow transgender youth to participate in girls' sports. The bill easily passed both houses of the General Assembly.

On 22 August 2022, citing his position as chairman of the Government Operations Committee of the Tennessee House of Representatives, Ragan sent a letter to eleven Tennessee state colleges and universities informing them that "college and university publications, policies and websites have no legal authorization or requirement to state or imply LGBTQ is a protected class under Title IX," that any policy "modifications related to the 23 June 2021 letter from the US Department of Education could be interpreted as violating state law." The letter advised schools to "immediately revoke and/or remove any publications, policies and website entries ... that state or imply that LGBTQ students, etc., are a protected class under Title IX" and report their actions to his legislative office by 2 September. Chris Sanders of the LGBT advocacy group Tennessee Equality Project accused Ragan of overstepping his authority by micromanaging the universities, saying that "instruct[ing] one of our public universities what to do, that’s not his job. His job is to make state laws."

=== Personal life ===
Ragan is a Southern Baptist and a member of Grace Baptist Church, a megachurch in Knoxville, Tennessee, that in 2004 reported having 3,450 members. He has been involved in a video ministry of this church.

Ragan is married to his wife Elizabeth (Liz). They are the parents of two children (one deceased), and three grandchildren.
