= Memphis Greenspace =

Non-profit corporation based in Memphis, Tennessee

Memphis Greenspace Inc. is a non-profit corporation started in October 2017 in Memphis, Tennessee. The issue that led to its creation was the unanimous decision of the City Council of Memphis and Shelby County to remove statues of Confederate Generals Robert E. Lee and Nathan Bedford Forrest from public parks. However, under the new Tennessee Heritage Protection Act, they could not do so without permission from the Tennessee Historical Commission, which refused permission.

Memphis Greenspace purchased Health Sciences Park (formerly Forrest Park) and Fourth Bluff Park, which housed the two statues, for US$1,000 (equivalent to $1,283 in 2024) each, and immediately removed the statues. According to the terms of the sale, the land must continue as parks.

The president of Memphis Greenspace is Van Turner, a Shelby County Commissioner. He announced that it plans to buy more parks in the future.

In 2019, a legal action brought against Memphis Greenspace's removal of the statues was dismissed by the Tennessee Court of Appeals.

In 2020, Memphis Greenspace agreed to the removal of the remains of Nathan Bedford Forrest and his wife Anne, which had been buried beneath the equestrian statue of Forrest in Health Science Park, to another site.
