= Jim Hackworth =

American politician (born 1951)

Member of the Tennessee House of Representatives from the 33rd district
- In office January 8, 2003 – January 11, 2011
- Preceded by: Gene Caldwell
- Succeeded by: John Ragan

Personal details
- Born: March 18, 1951 (age 75)
- Party: Democratic

Jim Hackworth (born March 18, 1951) is a former Democratic member of the Tennessee House of Representatives, for the 33rd district, from 2003 to 2011.

== Career ==
In 2002, Jim Hackworth was elected as State Representative to the General Assembly for the 33rd district, defeating Republican Steve Mead in a narrow victory. Hackworth went on to win re-election in 2004, 2006, and 2008.

Hackworth lost re-election against Republican John Ragan, in 2010.

In 2012, Hackworth ran for the 33rd district election, to reclaim his seat. He lost to John Ragan in the general election.

== Personal life ==
Hackworth lives in Clinton, Tennessee, he has a wife and two children.
