= Tennessee Heritage Protection Act =

The Tennessee Heritage Protection Act (THPA) was enacted in 2013, amended in 2016, 2018, and 2023. It prohibits the removal, relocation, or renaming of a memorial that is, or is located on, public property without permission (a waiver). Changes enacted in 2023 require a two-thirds vote of approval from the nine member Tennessee Monuments and Memorials Commission. Until June, 2023 cases were heard by the board of the Tennessee Historical Commission, 24 of whose members are appointed by the Governor and the remainder ex-officio. The purpose of the Act is to prevent the removal of Confederate memorials from public places in Tennessee. As put by The New York Times, the act shows "an express intent to prevent municipalities in Tennessee from taking down Confederate memorials."

In 2018, because of Memphis's transfer of ownership of statues of Robert E. Lee and Nathan Bedford Forrest as a means of removing them (see Memphis Greenspace), an amendment to the Act prohibits municipalities from selling or transferring ownership of memorials without permission. The amendment also "allows any entity, group or individual with an interest in a memorial to seek an injunction to preserve the memorial in question."

In 2021 the Tennessee Historical Commission board permitted the removal and relocation of the bust of Nathan Bedford Forrest and two others from the State Capitol to the Tennessee State Museum. In a prior case the Commission approved relocating several World War II monuments in Chattanooga, and it has approved the sale of several acres of the historic Sam Davis Home in Smyrna for commercial development. Davis was known as the “Boy Hero of the Confederacy.” The Commission has heard other cases, one of which was Memphis's application to remove the Nathan Bedford Forrest statue.

In 2018 The Tennessee Historical Commission acknowledged that one member (Judge David Tipton) also belonged to the Sons of Confederate Veterans. The Memphis Mayor's office has said that as of 2016 there were several people who belonged to both organizations.

== See also ==
- Removal of Confederate monuments and memorials
- Lost Cause of the Confederacy
- Racism in the United States
