= Nathan Bedford Forrest Bust =

Bust of Confederate general Nathan Bedford Forrest

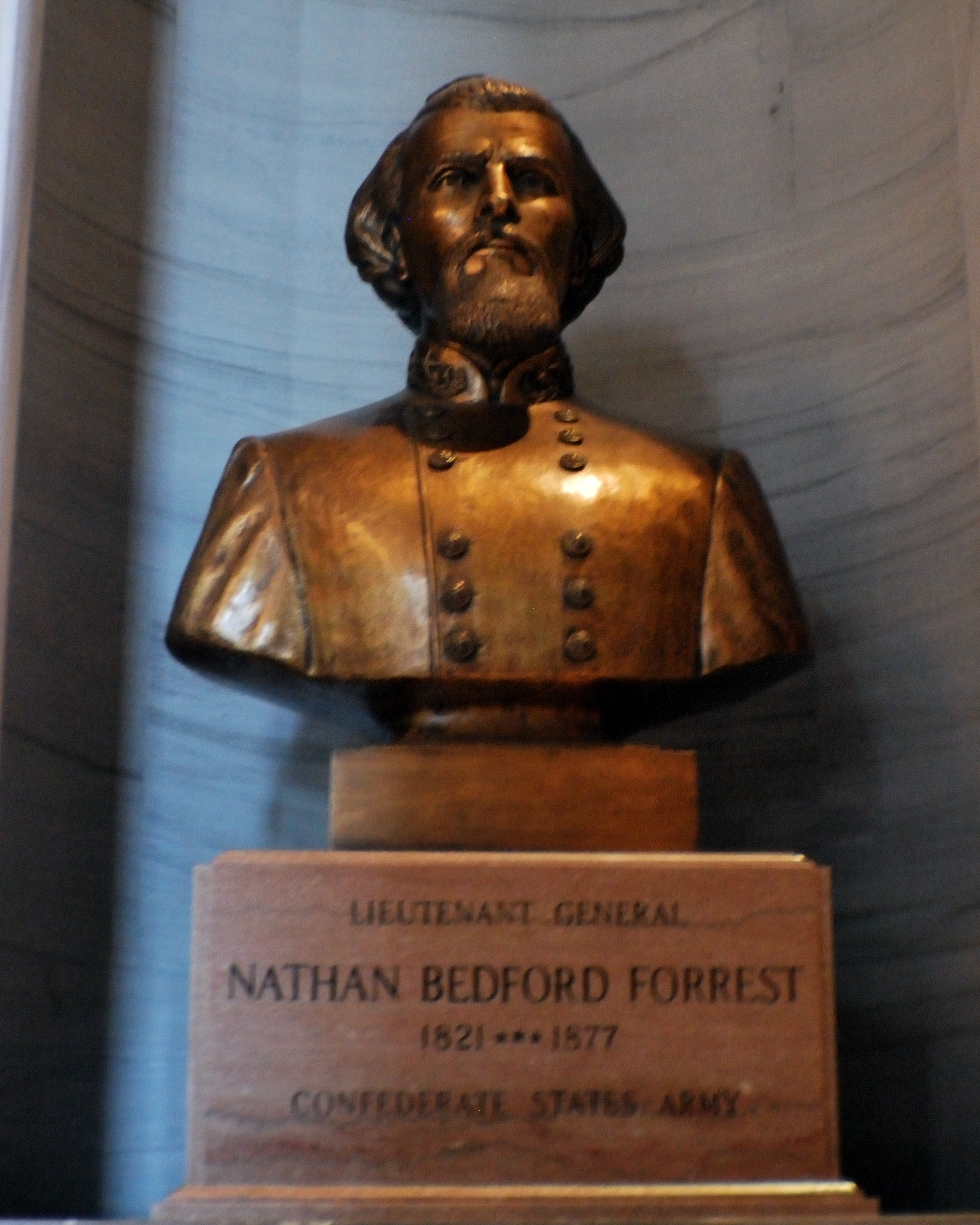
- Artist: Loura Jane Herndon Baxendale
- Completion date: 1978
- Medium: Bronze
- Dimensions: (44 inches in)
- Weight: 3,000 pounds
- Location: Tennessee State Capitol (1978–2021) Tennessee State Museum, Nashville, Tennessee, United States; 36.171500°N 86.790720°W

The Nathan Bedford Forrest Bust is a bust of Confederate States of America Lt. General and first-era Ku Klux Klan Grand Wizard Nathan Bedford Forrest that was prominently displayed in the Tennessee State Capitol in Nashville. On July 23, 2021, the bust was removed, and was relocated to the Tennessee State Museum in a new exhibit that opened four days later.

== History ==
Kenneth P'pool, who chaired the Nathan Bedford Forrest Bust Committee of the Sons of Confederate Veterans in 1973 (P'pool reportedly also earlier supported the candidacy of George Wallace for president in 1968), the late Tennessee state Senator and Sons of Confederate Veterans Joseph E. Johnston Camp 28 member Douglas Henry (D-Nashville), and the late Civil War expert and collector Lanier Merrit are attributed with heading up the project to install a bust representing Nathan Bedford Forrest inside the Tennessee General Assembly building. Henry first proposed Joint Resolution 54 (1973) in the Tennessee Senate calling for a bust of Confederate Lt. General Nathan Bedford Forrest to be installed within the state capitol, which passed on April 13, 1973.

Forrest has been considered by many of his advocates to be an iconic Southern hero of the American Civil War because of his reported military exploits, including his saving "Rome (Georgia) from a raid by Union military". However, Forrest is also known for his antebellum career as a slave trader, for commanding the Massacre at Fort Pillow, and for his eventual role as the Grand Wizard of the first era Ku Klux Klan during the Reconstruction era of United States history.

Fundraising for the Nathan Bedford Forrest bust was generated from the sale of 24″ × 30″ reproductions of a Forrest portrait at the Travellers Rest, a historic plantation in the Nashville area. The portrait by Joy Garner had been commissioned in 1973 for Travellers Rest by the Joseph E. Johnston camp of the Sons of Confederate Veterans. The bust was eventually designed by Loura Jane Herndon Baxendale, whose husband Albert Hatcher Baxendale, Jr., was a member of the Sons of Confederate Veterans.

The Nathan Bedford Forrest bust was cast by the Karkadoulias Bronze Art Foundry in Cincinnati, Ohio, and installed in the Tennessee State Capitol on November 5, 1978.

=== Protests ===
On the day of the bust's dedication, numerous African Americans protested at the capitol. More protests were organized by Black Tennesseans for Action in February 1979 after they were unsuccessful in gaining a meeting with Republican governor Lamar Alexander to discuss the issue. That month, the bust was "damaged after someone struck it in the head with a blunt object". Soon after, two crosses were burned in Nashville, a symbolic intimidation associated with the historic Ku Klux Klan; one of these crosses was burned outside the Tennessee NAACP headquarters. In October 1980, "Tex Moore, grand dragon of the Tennessee chapter of the Invisible Empire, Knights of the Ku Klux Klan, and others held a news conference in front of the bust."

==== 2015 ====
Democratic Congressman Jim Cooper and state Representative Craig Fitzhugh suggested that the Nathan Bedford Forrest bust should be removed from the Tennessee capitol in the wake of the 2015 Charleston church shooting, a horrific event in which nine African Americans were murdered in their church by a young white supremacist, Dylann Roof. Republican governor Bill Haslam and Senator Bob Corker also agreed. However, its removal was postponed.

==== 2017 ====
After the violence of the 2017 Unite the Right rally in Charlottesville, Virginia, Governor Bill Haslam explicitly called for removal of the Nathan Bedford Forrest bust from the Tennessee state capitol building, while U.S. senator Bob Corker suggested it should be relocated for public display at the Tennessee State Museum. But the Capitol Commission oversees elements of maintaining the complex. Composed of Secretary of State Tre Hargett, State Treasurer David Lillard, and Comptroller Justin P. Wilson, the Commission voted to reject the removal. Governor Haslam said that he was "very disappointed" with this decision.

In December 2017, a legislative bill was proposed to relocate the Nathan Bedford Forrest bust to the nearby Tennessee State Museum, which is one of the largest state museums in the United States and houses one of the largest collections of artifacts from the U.S. Civil War.

==== 2019 ====
In January 2019, members of the State Capitol Commission turned down a request to remove the bust by a 7 to 5 vote.

At the end of January 2019, a group of Tennessee college students arrived at the Tennessee State capitol to request of newly elected governor Bill Lee that the bust be removed. State troopers did not allow the students to see the governor because they did not have an appointment, but they did manage to meet with a representative from his office. Justin Jones and Jeneisha Harris led sit-in protests and were arrested.

=== Relocation to the Tennessee State Museum ===
==== 2020 ====
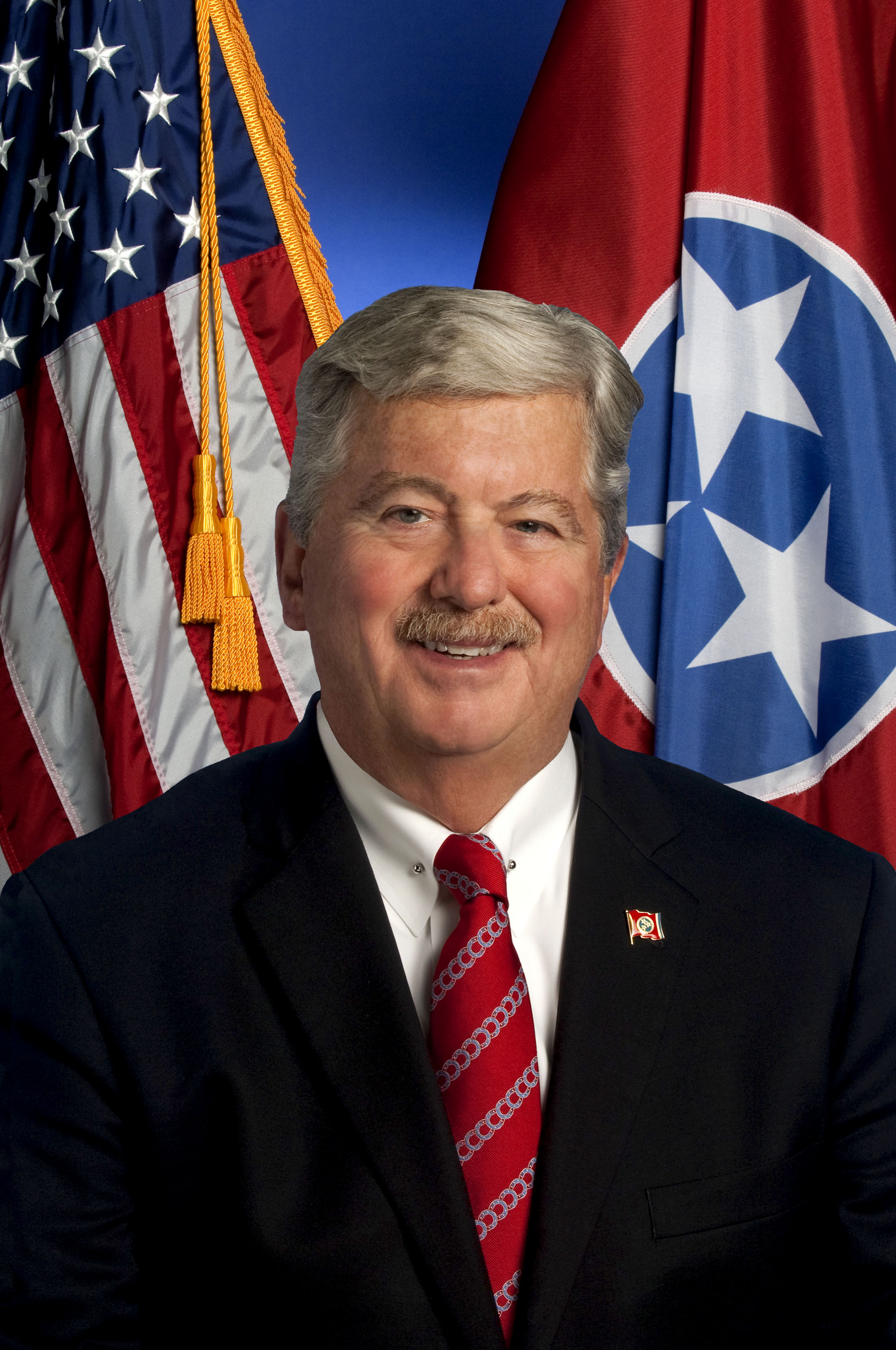
Tennessee Lt. Governor Randy McNally.

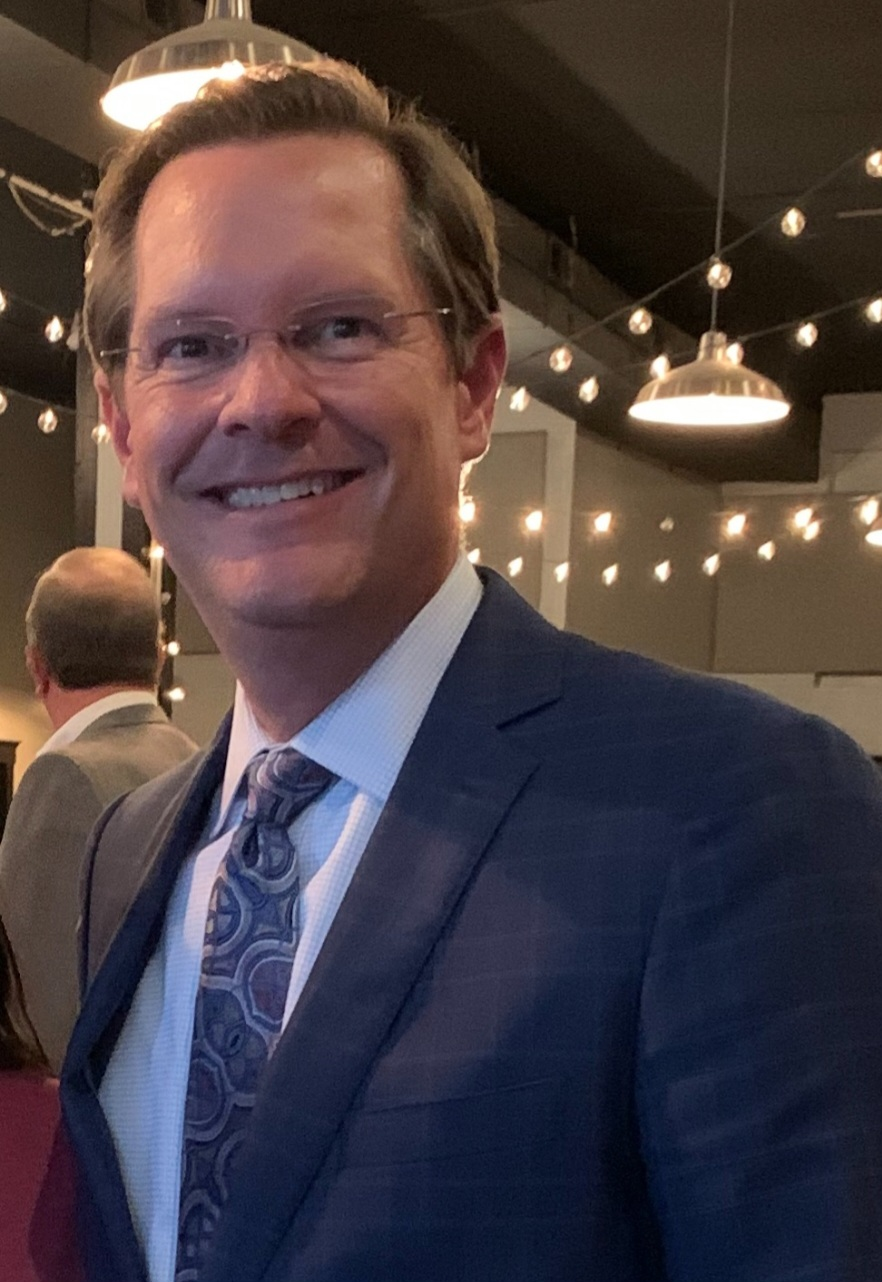
Tennessee House Speaker Cameron Sexton.

On June 9, 2020, the Tennessee General Assembly debated HJR 0686 to remove the bust. Republican opposition to removal led to the motion failing in the House by five votes to eleven.

On July 9, 2020, the Tennessee Capitol Commission voted 9–2 in favor of removing the bust from the Capitol building and relocating it to the Tennessee State Museum.

==== 2021 ====
Senator Joey Hensley (R-Hohenwald; also a member of the Sons of Confederate Veterans) filed a retaliatory bill, SB0600 on February 9, 2021, that if enacted into state law, would cancel the appointments of all 29 members of the Tennessee Historical Commission and create a revisionary Tennessee Historical Commission of 12 entirely new members with the governor of Tennessee, the House Speaker, and the Lt. Governor each appointing four commission members. SB0600 was co-sponsored within the Tennessee Senate by Senators Janice Bowling (R-Tullahoma), Frank Niceley (R-Strawberry Plains), and Mark Pody (R-Lebanon).

Representative John Ragan (R-Oak Ridge) filed his House companion bill, HB1227, on February 11, 2021, and initially signed on Reps. Paul Sherrell (R-Sparta), Jay D. Reedy (R-Erin), Rusty Grills (R-Newbern), Jerry Sexton (R-Bean Station), Kent Calfee (R-Kingston), Todd Warner (R-Chapel Hill), and Clay Doggett (R-Pulaski) as prime co-sponsors of the House bill seeking to cancel out and revise the Tennessee Historical Commission membership.

Tennessee House Speaker Cameron Sexton (R-Crossville) and Lt. Gov. Randy McNally (R-Oak Ridge) in a February 26, 2021, letter to Tennessee Attorney General Herbert Slatery queried as to if the Tennessee Capitol Commission had the authority to seek permission from the Tennessee Historical Commission to remove the Nathan Bedford Forrest bust. McNally reportedly has been a vocal defender of displaying the Forrest bust at the second floor of the Tennessee General Assembly building.

Following the Tennessee Capitol Commission’s amended approval in 2020, the Tennessee Historical Commission voted 25–1 on March 17, 2021, after a five-hour meeting, to move the Nathan Bedford Forrest bust, along with two other busts, for public display at the nearby Tennessee State Museum. Governor Bill Lee (R) said this should be done as soon as possible.

On July 22, 2021, the state Building Commission voted 5–2 to give final approval to relocate the bust to the state museum. The bust was removed the following day. On July 27, 2021, the bust became part of a new exhibit at the Tennessee State Museum.

== See also ==
- Sam Davis Statue, outside the Tennessee State Capitol
- Monuments and memorials to Nathan Bedford Forrest
