= Nathan Bedford Forrest Statue =

Statue of Confederate General and Ku Klux Klan leader Nathan Bedford Forrest

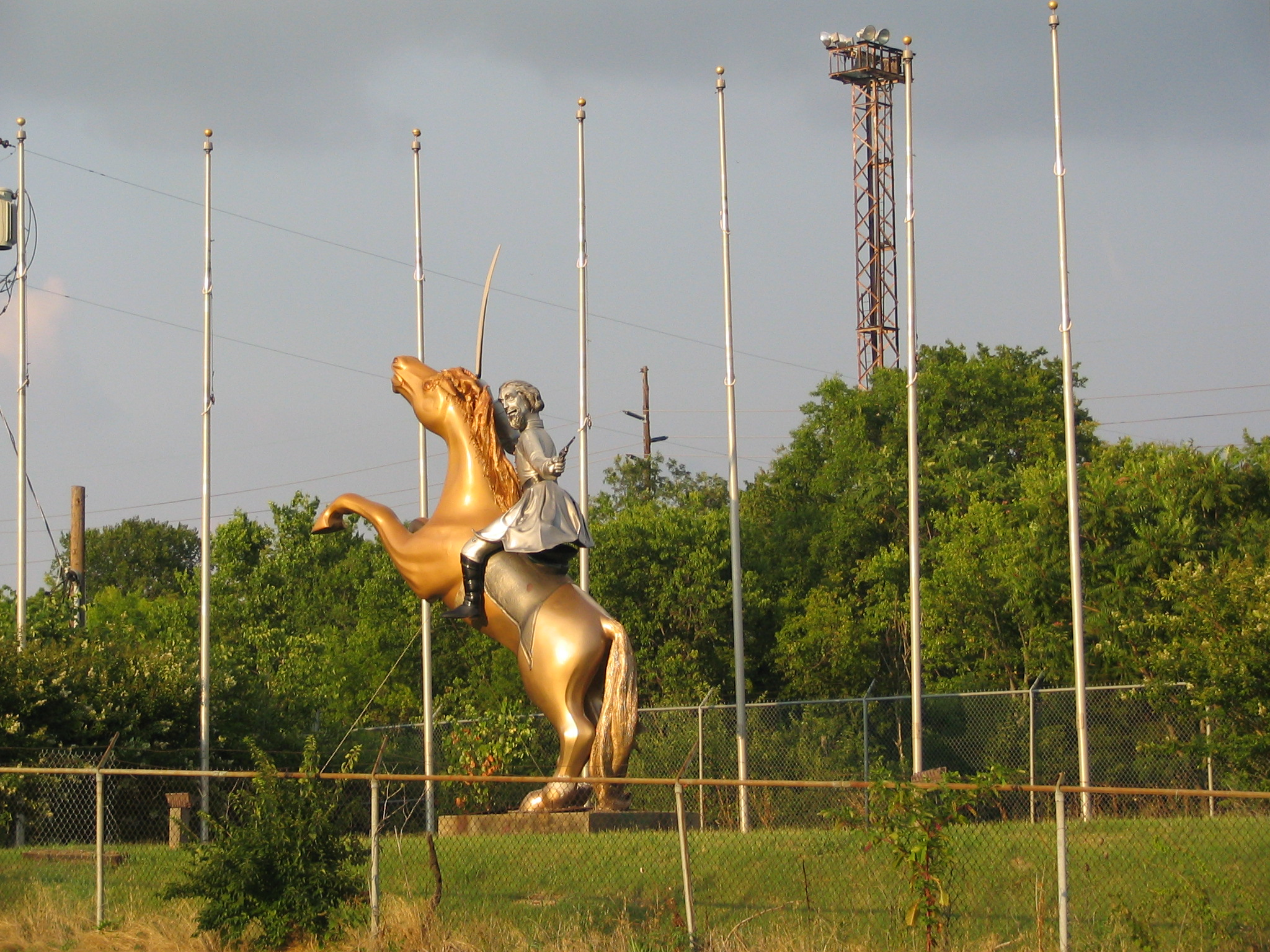
- Artist: Jack Kershaw
- Year: 1998
- Medium: Polyurethane, Gold and Silver
- Subject: Nathan Bedford Forrest
- Dimensions: (25 ft tall (2x life size) in)
- Condition: damaged; in storage
- Location: Nashville, Tennessee, United States; 36°03′42″N 86°46′17″W
- Owner: Bill Dorris (1998-2020); Battle of Nashville Trust (2020-present)

The Nathan Bedford Forrest Statue was a controversial 25-foot (7.6 m) equestrian statue of Confederate Lt. General Nathan Bedford Forrest publicly displayed for 23 years (1998–2021) along Interstate 65 in Nashville, Tennessee. The controversial work was located on a narrow strip of private land in Nashville's Crieve Hall area and was prominently visible from I-65 at 701D Hogan Road. It was displayed alongside 13 flags representing the Confederacy and various Southern states. The work, by amateur sculptor Jack Kershaw, was widely mocked by national media for its crude craftsmanship and attracted decades of controversy and repeated vandalism before being removed on December 7, 2021. Critics said the work's distorted facial features bore little resemblance to Forrest himself. The depiction showed Forrest mounted on a rearing horse holding a sword aloft in his right hand and a pistol in his left.

The statue's owner, Nashville businessman William C. “Bill” Dorris, died in November 2020, bequeathing the statue to the Battle of Nashville Trust (BONT), a non-profit historical organization dedicated to preserving Battle of Nashville battlefield. In 2021, the Trust announced the statue was disassembled and removed from the site with no plans for its reinstallation. The Confederate flags, commonly referred to as the "Stars and Bars", remained until 2024, at which time they were replaced with current state flags representing both Union and Confederate states that participated in the 1864 Battle of Nashville.

== Design and construction ==
The monument was designed by Jack Kershaw, a Vanderbilt University alumnus and co-founder of the League of the South (a white nationalist and white supremacist organization). Kershaw was a member of The General Joseph E. Johnston Camp 28 Sons of Confederate Veterans, and a former attorney who represented convicted assassin James Earl Ray. Kershaw defended the statue against criticism famously stating, "Somebody needs to say a good word for slavery."

Bill Dorris, a friend of Kershaw and owner of the statue, told NPR in 2011, describing Kershaw: "As an artist, mediocre. As a thinker, he was way ahead of a lot of people in his time." He also described Kershaw's process of sculpting: "Jack got some materials that I use to make bathtubs with. And he started with a butcher knife. That's the end result that you see out there right now." Kershaw told an interviewer that he envisioned the figure of Forrest as "crying 'Follow me!'"

The character representing Forrest on the molded polyurethane sculpture was displayed on a rearing horse while pointing a pistol in his left hand in a direction behind him, and a sword held aloft in the right hand. The horse section of the statue was covered in gold leaf, while the section of the statue representing Forrest is covered in silver leaf. The statue itself was 25 feet (7.6 m) tall.

== Location and dedication ==
The statue was installed in 1998, surrounded by two cellphone transmission towers and thirteen flag poles (flying the Confederate battle flag and various other Confederate and state flags) on 3.5 acres (1.4 ha) of land then privately owned by Nashville businessman Bill Dorris. The property at 701D Hogan Rd is long and narrow, with Interstate 65 on one side and railway tracks on the other.

The monument was visible from the Interstate by the northbound shoulder near mile marker 77 south of downtown Nashville. Around the time the statue was installed, the state cleared vegetation to make it more visible from the Interstate, primarily due to the efforts of then-Tennessee State Senator and Sons of Confederate Veterans member Douglas Henry (D-Nashville). The statue was controversial since before it was installed.

The statue was dedicated on July 11, 1998, by the Joseph E. Johnston Camp of the Sons of Confederate Veterans, who invited "40 other SCV camps, the United Daughters of the Confederacy and 10 re-enactment groups in period dress." The SCV camp called it one of its most ambitious projects and noted the additional sponsorship of The Southern League and the Mary Noel Kershaw Foundation. In total, the dedication ceremony was attended by approximately 400 people, including Alberta Martin, who was once believed to be the last surviving widow of a Confederate soldier, and Senator Henry.

== Criticism ==
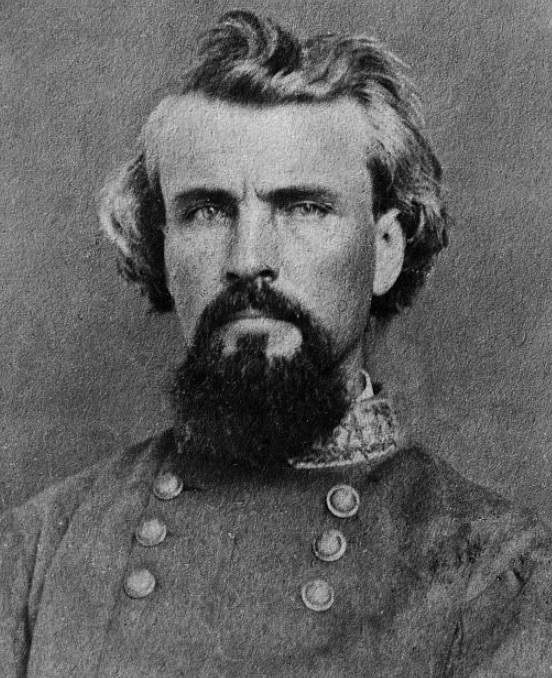
The statue was frequently criticized for its bizarre portrayal of its subject (pictured)

Shortly after the unveiling in 1998, BlueShoe Nashville noted that newspaper coverage showed that support for and dismay against the statue generally followed racial lines. It also critiqued the statue's quality, remarking that "Anyone seeing the crazed, pop-eyed look on the statue's face might wonder if the memorial is a homage, or a savage put-down."

In 2006, local blogger Brent K. Moore wrote that Forrest "has an expression that one makes after sitting on a thumb tack."

Critic Connor O'Neill called it "our nation's ugliest Confederate statue... so absurd and tacky that it looks like a joke". In 2015, The Washington Post called it "the weirdest Confederate statue in existence" and found the statue to have "a cartoonish and inadvertently satirical tone, incorporating elements of fiberglass and foil-candy wrapper coloring". The Post called the horse a "golden steed that looks like it was ripped from a merry-go-round for giants."

In June 2015 Gawker described the "alarming" statue as being created by a "fierce racist... for another bad man. The statue is so hilariously stupid that we should keep it forever" for it "perfectly honors the Confederacy."

A November 2015 Vibe.com article entitled 7 Controversial & Offensive Tourist Attractions In The U.S. described the installation as the "ugliest" statue of Forrest and noted it is "surrounded by an overwhelmingly large display of numerous Confederate flags"

Rachel Maddow on MSNBC described it as having "terrifying marble blue eyes" and a "mouth like a circular saw".

Comedian Stephen Colbert first quoted President Trump's tweets about "preserving the beautiful monuments" in the wake of the 2017 Unite the Right rally in Charlottesville, Virginia, then immediately mocked this statue by saying "apparently the Confederacy was founded by skirt-wearing nutcrackers riding wet lizards" and by mimicking the pose, shooting invisible soldiers following Forrest and riding an imaginary horse around the stage. Similarly, comedian John Oliver referred to the statue as being "objectively terrifying regardless of context", describing the statue's face as looking "like if a nickel did cocaine".

In 2017 Slate called the statue the "Confederacy's Dumbest Monument."

Atlas Obscura called it "One Confederate statue that accurately reflects the ugliness of its subject."

In an article titled The 10 Most Terrifying Public Statues Artnet news wrote the "statue (is) alarmingly racist, to say that it is also poorly done is a gross understatement", while Shareart led The 10 Most Bizarre Public Sculptures with this effort.

Salon described the statue as something "fashioned by someone who's had a human described to him but has never actually seen one in real life."

The Independent went with a simple "stupid, racist statue" and called for its removal.

Canada's National Post called the monument a "towering eyesore" and described it as "one of the most vile Confederate monuments in the great state of Tennessee."

In late December 2017, the statue was vandalized with pink paint. In October, 2020, it was vandalized by spray painting "Monster" along its side.

== Removal ==
In a joint statement issued on December 7, 2021, by the Trust along with the Executor and attorney for the Dorris Estate, the Trust specified the reasons for removal of the statue, noting that "each reason sets aside the contentious debate about Forrest as a person or as a Confederate general:

1. Forrest was not present at The Battle of Nashville.

2. The statue is ugly and a blight on Nashville.

3. It has been vandalized, is in disrepair, and is dangerous.

4. Because of its divisive nature, having the statue in a prominent location distracts from the mission of the Battle of Nashville Trust".

In a separate statement, the Battle of Nashville Trust also noted that "even Forrest himself would think it was ugly," adding that the Dorris property and statue were not on core battlefield ground. The Trust stressed in its statements that the Forrest statue was not consistent with the historical significance of the Battle of Nashville, which was one of the most decisive of the Civil War and ended the Confederacy's western campaign, nor was it consistent with Battle of Nashville Trust's efforts to protect the remaining historic sites of the battlefield, which currently exist within residential and commercial properties of South Nashville.

The statue was shot at more than once, vandalized regularly over the years, and more recently defaced with Black Lives Matter slogans, but always repaired. Protestors once tried to pull it down by tying it to a train. It was protected by a padlocked gate. At the time of its removal, it had been splattered with pink paint and spray-painted with the word "monster."

In July 2015 the Metropolitan Council of Nashville and Davidson County sought permission to plant landscape screening in front of the monument to obscure its view from the Interstate, but the request was denied by the Tennessee Department of Transportation.

The statue was criticized by then-councilwoman and former mayor Megan Barry in the wake of the 2015 Charleston church shooting, as "an offensive display of hatred that should not be a symbol for a progressive and welcoming city such as Nashville." Then-governor Bill Haslam said "It's not a statue that I like and that most Tennesseans are proud of in any way," in 2015.

On August 15, 2017, the mayor of nearby Oak Hill, Heidi Campbell, wrote an open letter to Governor Haslam urging the statue be obscured with landscaping.

The statue was removed on December 7, 2021, but the Confederate flags surrounding the statue remained in place until their removal in 2024. The statue was damaged during its removal, and was later disassembled and moved from the site. According to the BONT, the statue will not be remounted or displayed.

== Bill Dorris ==
The owner of the statue and the land it sat on, Bill Dorris, was a Nashville lawyer and businessman. He regularly gave media interviews defending his right to display the Forrest statue and his flags. Although Dorris denied being a racist, he called slavery a form of "social security" for African Americans.

Dorris stated that he had "turned down requests from the KKK to hold rallies" at the site. Dorris also argued that removing the statue would be detrimental to Nashville's tourism industry, and compared it to historic sites in the Nashville area such as the Travellers Rest, The Hermitage, and the Belle Meade Plantation.

When the Metro Region suggested adding vegetation, Dorris told WPLN that "I've got some 1,800-foot flagpoles. I could put them up starting tomorrow. They're going to have to build a helluva wall and a helluva bunch of trees to block all that."

Dorris told Canada's National Post he believed that the people against Confederate monuments in New Orleans were "cane blacks," who were probably "illegals to start with," in regards to controversies over Confederate monuments in that city. Dorris also said in that interview "Slavery was never an issue. Nathan Bedford Forrest was not a racist" and again called slavery a form of "social security" for African Americans, "a cradle-to-the-grave proposition."

Dorris died on November 24, 2020. His will left the statue and its site to the Battle of Nashville Trust, which opted to remove it. In addition, Dorris left approximately $5,000,000 in a trust for his dog, LuLu. The statue was removed on December 7, 2021.

== Aftermath ==
After removal of the statue, legal squabbles developed between two nonprofit organizations in regard to which flags should be displayed on the property. At issue were 13 flags honoring the Confederacy and the Battle of Nashville. A ruling was made that the original display failed to represent both sides of the 1864 battle. As a result, the multitude of Confederate flags, commonly referred to as the "Stars and Bars", was removed in 2024. Replacing them are current state flags representing both Union and Confederate states that participated in the 1864 Battle of Nashville.

== See also ==
- List of Confederate monuments and memorials
- Monuments and memorials to Nathan Bedford Forrest
- Statue of Lucille Ball, another statue noted for its perceived comical ugliness
