= 2024 Tennessee House of Representatives election =

- November 5, 2024

99 Seats in the Tennessee House of Representatives 50 seats needed for a majority
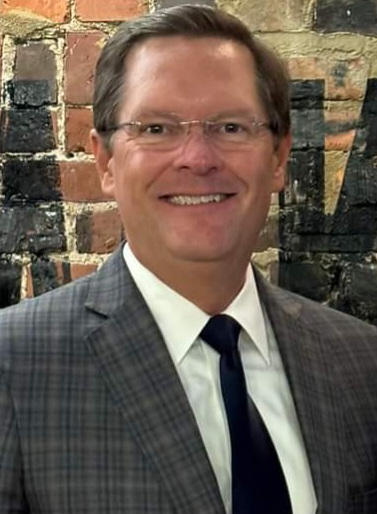

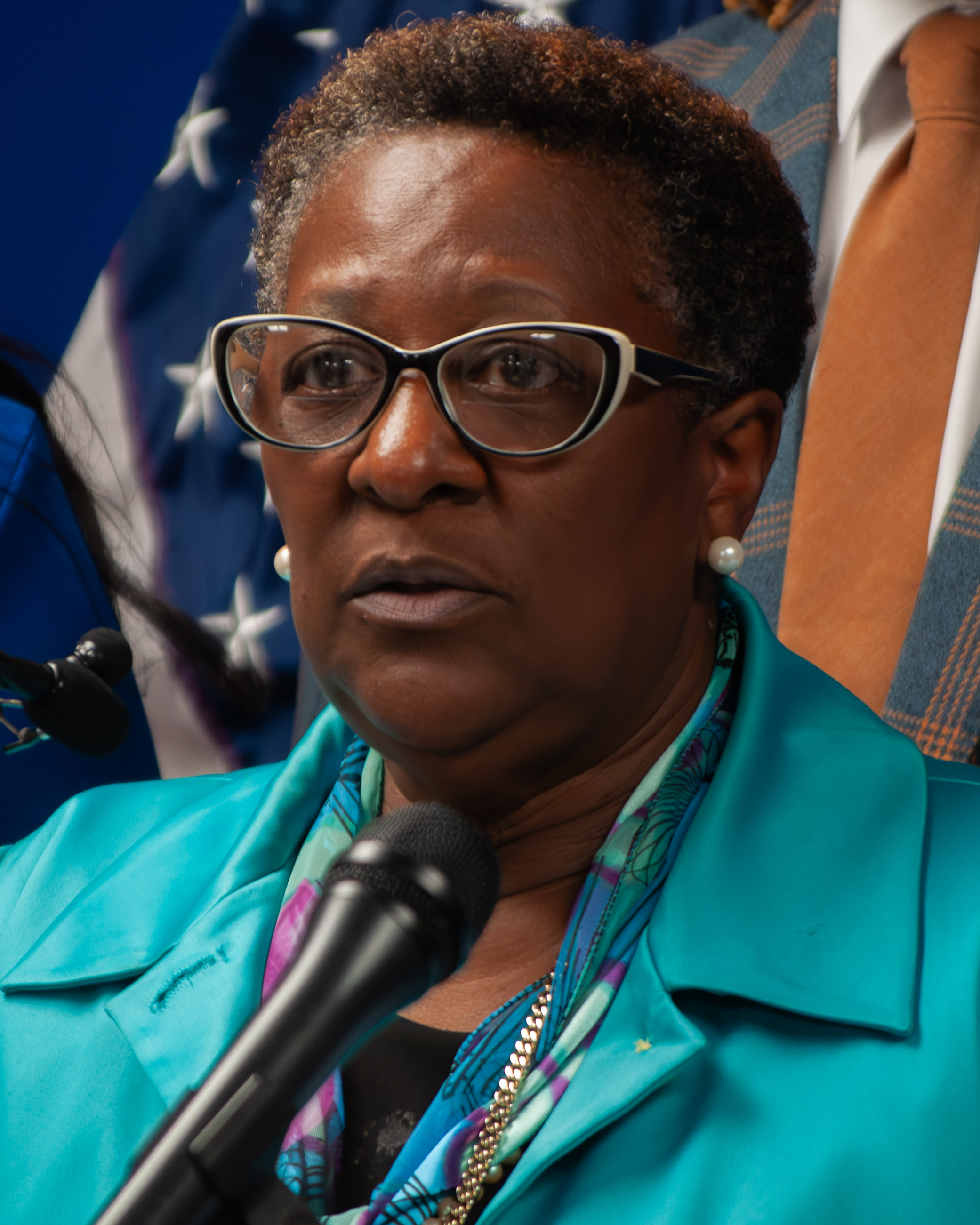
	Majority party	Minority party
Leader	Cameron Sexton	Karen Camper
Party	Republican	Democratic
Leader's seat	25th: Crossville	87th: Memphis
Last election	75 seats	24 seats
Seats before	75	24
Seats won	75	24
Seat change	Steady	Steady
Popular vote	1,853,837	873,533
Percentage	66.70%	31.43%
Swing	▼3.78%	▲4.57%
- Results: Democratic hold Republican hold Vote share: 50–60% 60–70% 70–80% 80–90% >90% 50–60% 60–70% 70–80% 80–90% >90%
Speaker of the House before election
Cameron Sexton
Republican
Elected Speaker of the House
Cameron Sexton
Republican

The 2024 Tennessee House of Representatives election was held on November 5, 2024, to elect 99 seats for the Tennessee House of Representatives. The elections coincided with the Presidential, U.S. Senate, U.S. House, and State Senate elections. The primary election was held on August 1, 2024. Tennessee has open primaries, meaning that any voter can choose to vote on either a Republican or Democratic ballot during primary elections.

Following the election, no seats changed hands between the parties, and the overall partisan composition of the Tennessee House remained unchanged. This marked the first time since 2006 that neither party gained nor lost a seat in a general election for the chamber.

== Background ==
This was the first general election held after the high-profile 2023 expulsions of Democratic Representatives Justin Jones and Justin J. Pearson. The expulsions occurred following their participation in a protest on the House floor advocating for gun control in the wake of the Covenant School shooting in Nashville. The incident drew widespread national media attention and was widely criticized by Democrats and civil rights organizations as undemocratic. Both lawmakers were later reappointed by local officials and won their respective special elections in 2023 to return to the House.

== Partisan background ==
In the 2024 presidential election in Tennessee, Republican Donald Trump won 75 State House districts, while Democrat Kamala Harris won 24 districts.

In Tennessee's 2024 State House elections, held alongside the presidential race, Democrats successfully held District 67 in Clarksville, a seat where Donald Trump won by 1.8%. Meanwhile, Republicans successfully held District 97 in Memphis, where Kamala Harris won with a 4.9% margin.

2024 Presidential data by House district: Trump: 50–60%; 60–70%; 70–80%; 80–90%; Harris: 50–60%; 60–70%; 70–80%; 80–90%

== Retirements ==
Seven incumbents did not seek re-election.

=== Republicans ===
1. District 4: John Holsclaw Jr. retired.
2. District 12: Dale Carr retired.
3. District 20: Bryan Richey retired to run for State Senate.
4. District 65: Sam Whitson retired.
5. District 68: Curtis Johnson retired.

=== Democrats ===
1. District 60: Darren Jernigan retired.
2. District 96: Dwayne Thompson retired.

== Incumbents defeated ==
=== In primary election ===
Two incumbent representatives, both Republicans, were defeated in the August 1 primary election.

==== Republicans ====
1. District 27: Patsy Hazlewood lost renomination to Michele Reneau.
2. District 33: John Ragan lost renomination to Rick Scarbrough.

== Predictions ==
Final CNalysis forecast Republican: Solid R; Very Likely/Likely R; Tilt R; Democratic: Solid D; Very Likely/Likely D

Source	Ranking	As of
270toWin	Safe R	July 17, 2024
CNalysis	Solid R	October 31, 2024
Sabato's Crystal Ball	Safe R	June 18, 2024

== Results summary ==
Summary of the November 5, 2024 Tennessee House of Representatives election results
Party	Candidates (Note: One candidate per party per seat)	Votes		Seats	
Party	Candidates	No.	%	No.	+/–
Republican	85	1,853,837	66.70	75	Steady
Democratic	74	873,533	31.43	24	Steady
Independent	13	51,704	1.86	0	Steady
Write-in	4	282	0.01	0	Steady
Total	176	2,779,356	100.00	99	Steady

Popular vote
Republican	66.70%
Democratic	31.43%
Independent	1.86%
Write-ins	0.01%

House seats
Republican	75.76%
Democratic	24.24%

=== Closest races ===
Six races were decided by a margin of 10% or less:

District	Winner	Margin
District 67	Democratic	0.60%
District 97	Republican	3.40%
District 18	Republican	7.50%
District 60	Democratic	7.56%
District 50	Democratic	8.18%
District 75	Republican	9.50%

== Overview ==
District	Incumbent				Candidates
District	Representative	Party	First elected	Status	Candidates
District 1	John Crawford	Republican	2016	Incumbent re-elected.	▌ ✓ John Crawford (Republican) 100.0%
District 2	Bud Hulsey	Republican	2014	Incumbent re-elected.	▌ ✓ Bud Hulsey (Republican) 100.0%
District 3	Timothy Hill	Republican	2012; 2020 (retired); 2023 (appointed)	Incumbent re-elected.	▌ ✓ Timothy Hill (Republican) 83.0%; ▌Lori Love (Democratic) 17.0%
District 4	John Holsclaw Jr.	Republican	2014	Incumbent retired. New member elected. Republican hold.	▌ ✓ Renea Jones (Republican) 100.0%
District 5	David B. Hawk	Republican	2002	Incumbent re-elected.	▌ ✓ David B. Hawk (Republican) 82.0%; ▌Rebecca Anderson (Independent) 18.0%
District 6	Tim Hicks	Republican	2020	Incumbent re-elected.	▌ ✓ Tim Hicks (Republican) 73.0%; ▌Brad Batt (Democratic) 27.1%
District 7	Rebecca Alexander	Republican	2020	Incumbent re-elected.	▌ ✓ Rebecca Alexander (Republican) 71.3%; ▌Sylvain Bruni (Democratic) 28.7%
District 8	Jerome Moon	Republican	2017 (appointed); 2018	Incumbent re-elected.	▌ ✓ Jerome Moon (Republican) 77.2%; ▌Sue DuBois (Democratic) 22.8%
District 9	Gary Hicks	Republican	2015 (appointed); 2016	Incumbent re-elected.	▌ ✓ Gary Hicks (Republican) 100.0%
District 10	Rick Eldridge	Republican	2018	Incumbent re-elected.	▌ ✓ Rick Eldridge (Republican) 99.1%; ▌Nathan Dressel (Write-in) 0.9%
District 11	Jeremy Faison	Republican	2010	Incumbent re-elected.	▌ ✓ Jeremy Faison (Republican) 84.4%; ▌Justin Gross (Democratic) 15.6%
District 12	Dale Carr	Republican	2012	Incumbent retired. New member elected. Republican hold.	▌ ✓ Fred Atchley (Republican) 82.2%; ▌Leslie P Braddock (Democratic) 17.8%
District 13	Robert Stevens	Republican	2022	Incumbent re-elected.	▌ ✓ Robert Stevens (Republican) 59.9%; ▌Jonathan Yancey (Democratic) 40.1%
District 14	Jason Zachary	Republican	2015 (special)	Incumbent re-elected.	▌ ✓ Jason Zachary (Republican) 64.8%; ▌Amanda Collins (Democratic) 35.2%
District 15	Sam McKenzie	Democratic	2020	Incumbent re-elected.	▌ ✓ Sam McKenzie (Democratic) 68.0%; ▌Justin Hirst (Republican) 32.0%
District 16	Michele Carringer	Republican	2020	Incumbent re-elected.	▌ ✓ Michele Carringer (Republican) 68.7%; ▌Lauren Carver (Democratic) 28.7%; ▌Sean Eastham (Independent) 2.6%
District 17	Andrew Farmer	Republican	2012	Incumbent re-elected.	▌ ✓ Andrew Farmer (Republican) 100.0%
District 18	Elaine Davis	Republican	2022	Incumbent re-elected.	▌ ✓ Elaine Davis (Republican) 53.8%; ▌Bryan Goldberg (Democratic) 46.3%
District 19	Dave Wright	Republican	2018	Incumbent re-elected.	▌ ✓ Dave Wright (Republican) 100.0%
District 20	Bryan Richey	Republican	2022	Incumbent retired to run for State Senate. New member elected. Republican hold.	▌ ✓ Tom Stinnett (Republican) 74.8%; ▌Karen Gertz (Democratic) 25.2%
District 21	Lowell Russell	Republican	2018	Incumbent re-elected.	▌ ✓ Lowell Russell (Republican) 81.1%; ▌Kenneth Moore (Democratic) 18.9%
District 22	Dan Howell	Republican	2014	Incumbent re-elected.	▌ ✓ Dan Howell (Republican) 85.2%; ▌Anna Miller Grabowski (Democratic) 14.8%
District 23	Mark Cochran	Republican	2018	Incumbent re-elected.	▌ ✓ Mark Cochran (Republican) 85.0%; ▌David Thomforde (Democratic) 15.0%
District 24	Kevin Raper	Republican	2022	Incumbent re-elected.	▌ ✓ Kevin Raper (Republican) 78.3%; ▌Andrea Chase (Democratic) 21.7%
District 25	Cameron Sexton	Republican	2010	Incumbent re-elected.	▌ ✓ Cameron Sexton (Republican) 81.8%; ▌Wesley Adkins (Democratic) 18.2%
District 26	Greg Martin	Republican	2022 (appointed)	Incumbent re-elected.	▌ ✓ Greg Martin (Republican) 62.1%; ▌Allison Gorman (Democratic) 37.9%
District 27	Patsy Hazlewood	Republican	2014	Incumbent lost renomination. New member elected. Republican hold.	▌ ✓ Michele Reneau (Republican) 60.2%; ▌Kathy Lennon (Democratic) 39.8%
District 28	Yusuf Hakeem	Democratic	2018	Incumbent re-elected.	▌ ✓ Yusuf Hakeem (Democratic) 74.9%; ▌Thomas J. Brooks III (Independent) 25.1%
District 29	Greg Vital	Republican	2018	Incumbent re-elected.	▌ ✓ Greg Vital (Republican) 70.7%; ▌Ryan Scofield (Democratic) 29.4%
District 30	Esther Helton-Haynes	Republican	2018	Incumbent re-elected.	▌ ✓ Esther Helton-Haynes (Republican) 59.7%; ▌Heather McClendon (Democratic) 40.3%
District 31	Ron Travis	Republican	2012	Incumbent re-elected.	▌ ✓ Ron Travis (Republican) 83.8%; ▌Brittany Lynn Warfel (Democratic) 13.5%; ▌William "Jay" Jenkins (Independent) 2.7%
District 32	Monty Fritts	Republican	2012	Incumbent re-elected.	▌ ✓ Monty Fritts (Republican) 100.0%
District 33	John Ragan	Republican	2010	Incumbent lost renomination. New member elected. Republican hold.	▌ ✓ Rick Scarbrough (Republican) 67.7%; ▌Anne Backus (Democratic) 32.3%
District 34	Tim Rudd	Republican	2016	Incumbent re-elected.	▌ ✓ Tim Rudd (Republican) 60.5%; ▌Amelia Pant (Democratic) 39.5%
District 35	William Slater	Republican	2022	Incumbent re-elected.	▌ ✓ William Slater (Republican) 70.8%; ▌Lexi Melton (Democratic) 29.2%
District 36	Dennis Powers	Republican	2010	Incumbent re-elected.	▌ ✓ Dennis Powers (Republican) 100.0%
District 37	Charlie Baum	Republican	2022	Incumbent re-elected.	▌ ✓ Charlie Baum (Republican) 64.2%; ▌Cheri Brown (Democratic) 35.8%
District 38	Kelly Keisling	Republican	2022	Incumbent re-elected.	▌ ✓ Kelly Keisling (Republican) 88.8%; ▌Alexander Armor (Independent) 11.2%
District 39	Iris Rudder	Republican	2018	Incumbent re-elected.	▌ ✓ Iris Rudder (Republican) 76.4%; ▌Rose Mary Drake (Democratic) 23.6%
District 40	Michael Hale	Republican	2022	Incumbent re-elected.	▌ ✓ Michael Hale (Republican) 83.7%; ▌Daniel T. Hawthorne (Democratic) 16.3%
District 41	Ed Butler	Republican	2022	Incumbent re-elected.	▌ ✓ Ed Butler (Republican) 82.9%; ▌Joel Derek Hawn (Democratic) 17.1%
District 42	Ryan Williams	Republican	2010	Incumbent re-elected.	▌ ✓ Ryan Williams (Republican) 73.9%; ▌Amber "Bennie" Taylor (Democratic) 26.1%
District 43	Paul Sherrell	Republican	2016	Incumbent re-elected.	▌ ✓ Paul Sherrell (Republican) 100.0%
District 44	William Lamberth	Republican	2012	Incumbent re-elected.	▌ ✓ William Lamberth (Republican) 77.1%; ▌Brian Robertson (Democratic) 22.9%
District 45	Johnny Garrett	Republican	2018	Incumbent re-elected.	▌ ✓ Johnny Garrett (Republican) 67.8%; ▌Alison Beale (Democratic) 32.2%
District 46	Clark Boyd	Republican	2018	Incumbent re-elected.	▌ ✓ Clark Boyd (Republican) 74.9%; ▌Joni Cochran (Democratic) 25.1%
District 47	Rush Bricken	Republican	2018	Incumbent re-elected.	▌ ✓ Rush Bricken (Republican) 79.8%; ▌Veronica Owens (Independent) 20.2%
District 48	Bryan Terry	Republican	2018	Incumbent re-elected.	▌ ✓ Bryan Terry (Republican) 65.3%; ▌Matt Ferry (Democratic) 34.7%
District 49	Mike Sparks	Republican	2010	Incumbent re-elected.	▌ ✓ Mike Sparks (Republican) 57.2%; ▌Luis Mata (Democratic) 42.8%
District 50	Bo Mitchell	Democratic	2012	Incumbent re-elected.	▌ ✓ Bo Mitchell (Democratic) 54.1%; ▌Jennifer Frensley Webb (Republican) 45.9%
District 51	Aftyn Behn	Democratic	2023 (special)	Incumbent re-elected.	▌ ✓ Aftyn Behn (Democratic) 73.9%; ▌Jeff Ketelsen (Independent) 26.1%
District 52	Justin Jones	Democratic	2023 (special)	Incumbent re-elected.	▌ ✓ Justin Jones (Democratic) 69.2%; ▌Laura Nelson (Republican) 30.8%
District 53	Jason Powell	Democratic	2012	Incumbent re-elected.	▌ ✓ Jason Powell (Democratic) 62.5%; ▌Yog Nepal (Republican) 33.4%; ▌Rueben I. Dockery (Independent) 4.1%
Districct 54	Vincent B. Dixie	Democratic	2018	Incumbent re-elected.	▌ ✓ Vincent B. Dixie (Democratic) 100.0%
District 55	John Ray Clemmons	Democratic	2014	Incumbent re-elected.	▌ ✓ John Ray Clemmons (Democratic) 100.0%
District 56	Bob Freeman	Democratic	2012	Incumbent re-elected.	▌ ✓ Bob Freeman (Democratic) 100.0%
District 57	Susan Lynn	Republican	2012	Incumbent re-elected.	▌ ✓ Susan Lynn (Republican) 67.7%; ▌Ailina Carona (Democratic) 32.3%
District 58	Harold M. Love Jr.	Democratic	2012	Incumbent re-elected.	▌ ✓ Harold M. Love Jr. (Democratic) 100.0%
District 59	Caleb Hemmer	Democratic	2022	Incumbent re-elected.	▌ ✓ Caleb Hemmer (Democratic) 100.0%
District 60	Darren Jernigan	Democratic	2012	Incumbent retired. New member elected. Democratic hold.	▌ ✓ Shaundelle Brooks (Democratic) 53.8%; ▌Chad Bobo (Republican) 46.2%
District 61	Gino Bulso	Republican	2022	Incumbent re-elected.	▌ ✓ Gino Bulso (Republican) 62.1%; ▌Claire Jones (Democratic) 35.7%; ▌Alana LeBlanc (Independent) 2.3%
District 62	Pat Marsh	Republican	2009 (special)	Incumbent re-elected.	▌ ✓ Pat Marsh (Republican) 100.0%
District 63	Jake McCalmon	Republican	2022	Incumbent re-elected.	▌ ✓ Jake McCalmon (Republican) 68.1%; ▌Laura Andreson (Democratic) 31.9%
District 64	Scott Cepicky	Republican	2018	Incumbent re-elected.	▌ ✓ Scott Cepicky (Republican) 70.2%; ▌Eileen Longstreet (Democratic) 29.8%
District 65	Sam Whitson	Republican	2016	Incumbent retired. New member elected. Republican hold.	▌ ✓ Lee Reeves (Republican) 69.3%; ▌Larhonda Williams (Democratic) 30.7%
District 66	Sabi "Doc" Kumar	Republican	2014	Incumbent re-elected.	▌ ✓ Sabi "Doc" Kumar (Republican) 73.0%; ▌Elizabeth Webb (Democratic) 18.9%; ▌Kevin Mead (Independent) 8.1%
District 67	Ronnie Glynn	Democratic	2022	Incumbent re-elected.	▌ ✓ Ronnie Glynn (Democratic) 50.3%; ▌Jamie Peltz (Republican) 49.7%
District 68	Curtis Johnson	Republican	2004	Incumbent retired. New member elected. Republican hold.	▌ ✓ Aron Maberry (Republican) 68.0%; ▌Garfield Scott (Democratic) 32.0%
District 69	Jody Barrett	Republican	2022	Incumbent re-elected.	▌ ✓ Jody Barrett (Republican) 100.0%
District 70	Clay Doggett	Republican	2018	Incumbent re-elected.	▌ ✓ Clay Doggett (Republican) 83.7%; ▌Jason Luttrell (Democratic) 16.3%
District 71	Kip Capley	Republican	2022	Incumbent re-elected.	▌ ✓ Kip Capley (Republican) 81.4%; ▌Timothy Coy (Democratic) 18.6%
District 72	Kirk Haston	Republican	2018	Incumbent re-elected.	▌ ✓ Kirk Haston (Republican) 100.0%
District 73	Chris Todd	Republican	2018	Incumbent re-elected.	▌ ✓ Chris Todd (Republican) 100.0%
District 74	Jay Reedy	Republican	2014	Incumbent re-elected.	▌ ✓ Jay Reedy (Republican) 100.0%
District 75	Jeff Burkhart	Republican	2022	Incumbent re-elected.	▌ ✓ Jeff Burkhart (Republican) 54.7%; ▌Allie Phillips (Democratic) 45.3%
District 76	Tandy Darby	Republican	2020	Incumbent re-elected.	▌ ✓ Tandy Darby (Republican) 84.4%; ▌James Hart (Independent) 15.6%
District 77	Rusty Grills	Republican	2020	Incumbent re-elected.	▌ ✓ Rusty Grills (Republican) 100.0%
District 78	Mary Littleton	Republican	2012	Incumbent re-elected.	▌ ✓ Mary Littleton (Republican) 74.1%; ▌Deborah Doyle (Democratic) 25.9%
District 79	Brock Martin	Republican	2022	Incumbent re-elected.	▌ ✓ Brock Martin (Republican) 100.0%
District 80	Johnny Shaw	Democratic	2000	Incumbent re-elected.	▌ ✓ Johnny Shaw (Democratic) 60.8%; ▌Brad Grantham (Republican) 39.2%
District 81	Debra Moody	Republican	2012	Incumbent re-elected.	▌ ✓ Debra Moody (Republican) 100.0%
District 82	Chris Hurt	Republican	2018	Incumbent re-elected.	▌ ✓ Chris Hurt (Republican) 100.0%
District 83	Mark White	Republican	2010	Incumbent re-elected.	▌ ✓ Mark White (Republican) 57.9%; ▌Noah Nordstrom (Democratic) 42.1%
District 84	Joe Towns	Democratic	1994	Incumbent re-elected.	▌ ✓ Joe Towns (Democratic) 100.0%
District 85	Jesse Chism	Democratic	2018	Incumbent re-elected.	▌ ✓ Jesse Chism (Democratic) 99.9%
District 86	Justin J. Pearson	Democratic	2023 (special)	Incumbent re-elected.	▌ ✓ Justin J. Pearson (Democratic) 77.9%; ▌Jeff Johnston (Independent) 22.1%
District 87	Karen Camper	Democratic	2008	Incumbent re-elected.	▌ ✓ Karen Camper (Democratic) 100.0%
District 88	Larry Miller	Democratic	1992	Incumbent re-elected.	▌ ✓ Larry Miller (Democratic) 71.8%; ▌Larry Hunter (Republican) 28.2%
District 89	Justin Lafferty	Republican	2018	Incumbent re-elected.	▌ ✓ Justin Lafferty (Republican) 66.6%; ▌Cary Hammond (Democratic) 33.4%
District 90	Gloria Johnson	Democratic	2012	Incumbent re-elected.	▌ ✓ Gloria Johnson (Democratic) 99.7%
District 91	Torrey Harris	Democratic	2020	Incumbent re-elected.	▌ ✓ Torrey Harris (Democratic) 100.0%
District 92	Todd Warner	Republican	2020	Incumbent re-elected.	▌ ✓ Todd Warner (Republican) 74.5%; ▌Teri Mai (Democratic) 25.5%
District 93	G. A. Hardaway	Democratic	2006	Incumbent re-elected.	▌ ✓ G. A. Hardaway (Democratic) 80.9%; ▌Renarda Clariett (Republican) 19.1%
District 94	Ron Gant	Republican	2016	Incumbent re-elected.	▌ ✓ Ron Gant (Republican) 78.4%; ▌Terry Saine (Democratic) 21.6%
District 95	Kevin Vaughan	Republican	2017 (special)	Incumbent re-elected.	▌ ✓ Kevin Vaughan (Republican) 100.0%
District 96	Dwayne Thompson	Democratic	2016	Incumbent retired. New member elected. Democratic hold.	▌ ✓ Gabby Salinas (Democratic) 100.0%
District 97	John Gillespie	Republican	2020	Incumbent re-elected.	▌ ✓ John Gillespie (Republican) 51.7%; ▌Jesse Huseth (Democratic) 48.3%
District 98	Antonio Parkinson	Democratic	2011 (special)	Incumbent re-elected.	▌ ✓ Antonio Parkinson (Democratic) 73.9%; ▌Cecil Hale (Republican) 26.1%
District 99	Tom Leatherwood	Republican	2018	Incumbent re-elected.	▌ ✓ Tom Leatherwood (Republican) 75.3%; ▌William Mouzon (Independent) 24.7%

== District 1 ==
2024 Tennessee House of Representatives 1st district election
Nominee	John Crawford
Party	Republican
Popular vote	24,296
Percentage	100.00%
Representative before election
John Crawford
Republican
Elected Representative
John Crawford
Republican

The 1st district is located in East Tennessee and consists of the northern half of Sullivan County along the Tennessee-Virginia border. It includes parts of the cities of Kingsport and Bristol. Incumbent Republican John Crawford has represented the district since 2017.

=== Republican primary ===
2024 Tennessee House of Representatives District 1 Republican primary
Party	Candidate	Votes	%
Republican	John Crawford (incumbent)	5,168	100.00
Total votes		5,168	100.00

=== General election ===
2024 Tennessee House of Representatives District 1 general election
Party	Candidate	Votes	%
Republican	John Crawford (incumbent)	24,296	100.00
Total votes		24,296	100.00
Republican hold			

== District 2 ==
2024 Tennessee House of Representatives 2nd district election
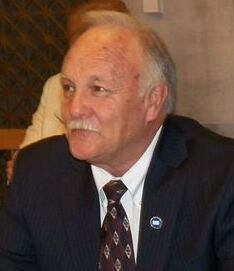
Nominee	Bud Hulsey
Party	Republican
Popular vote	26,619
Percentage	100.00%
Representative before election
Bud Hulsey
Republican
Elected Representative
Bud Hulsey
Republican

The 2nd district is located in East Tennessee in the Tri-Cities area and consists of a western portion of Sullivan County. The district includes all of the city of Blountville and parts of the cities of Kingsport and Bristol. Incumbent Republican Bud Hulsey has represented the district since 2015.

=== Republican primary ===
2024 Tennessee House of Representatives District 2 Republican primary
Party	Candidate	Votes	%
Republican	Bud Hulsey (incumbent)	7,290	100.00
Total votes		7,290	100.00

=== General election ===
2024 Tennessee House of Representatives District 2 general election
Party	Candidate	Votes	%
Republican	Bud Hulsey (incumbent)	26,619	100.00
Total votes		26,619	100.00
Republican hold			

== District 3 ==
2024 Tennessee House of Representatives 3rd district election
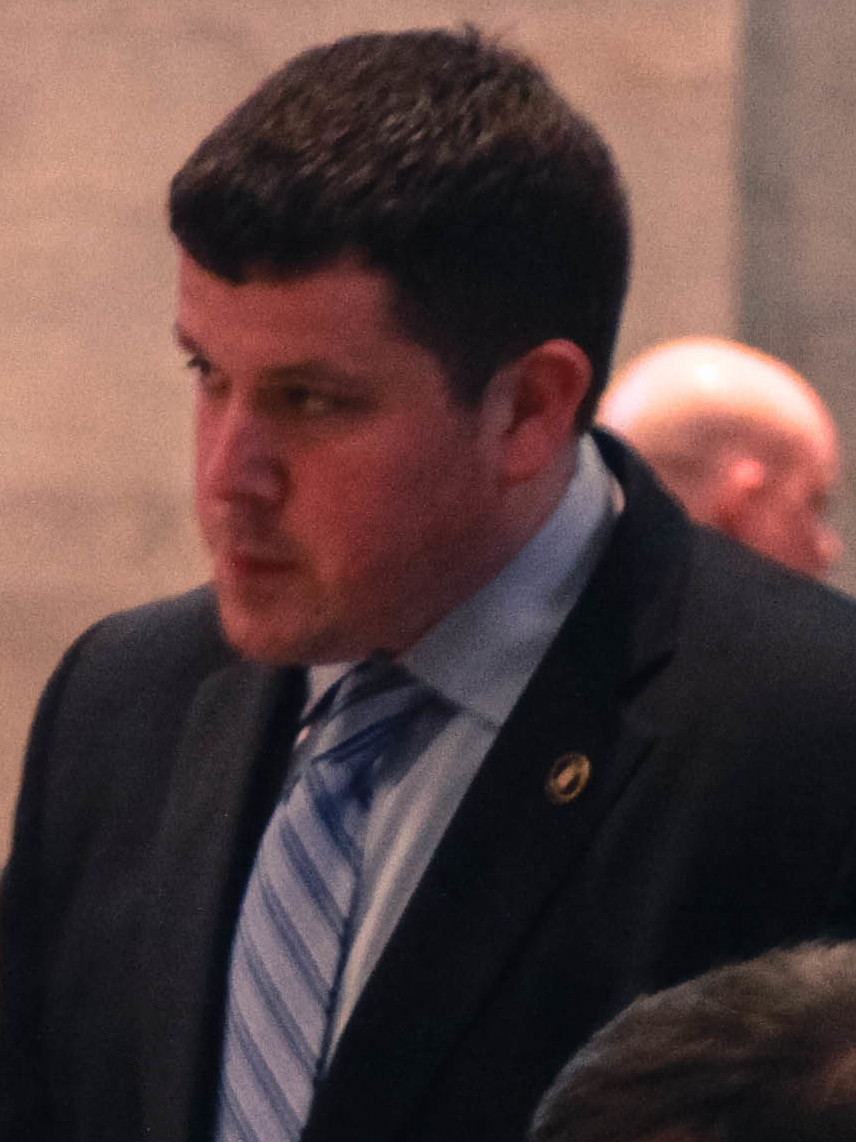

Nominee	Timothy Hill	Lori Love
Party	Republican	Democratic
Popular vote	25,634	5,248
Percentage	83.01%	16.99%
Representative before election
Timothy Hill
Republican
Elected Representative
Timothy Hill
Republican

The 3rd district is located in East Tennessee and consists of all of Johnson County and parts of Carter, Hawkins, and Sullivan counties. The district includes the cities of Mountain City, Bluff City, and Mount Carmel, as well as the northeasternmost point in the state at the North Carolina–Tennessee–Virginia Corners.

Incumbent Republican Timothy Hill has represented the district since he was appointed by the Johnson County Commission in May 2023 following the resignation of Republican representative Scotty Campbell. Campbell resigned over being found guilty by an ethics subcommittee of sexually harassing at least one of his interns. Hill previously represented the 3rd district from 2013 to 2021. He chose not to run for re-election in 2020 to instead run for the U.S. House of Representatives. He ultimately came in second place to Diana Harshbarger in the crowded Republican primary to replace retiring Representative Phil Roe.

=== Republican primary ===
2024 Tennessee House of Representatives District 3 Republican primary
Party	Candidate	Votes	%
Republican	Timothy Aaron Hill (incumbent)	7,109	100.00
Total votes		7,109	100.00

=== Democratic primary ===
2024 Tennessee House of Representatives District 3 Democratic primary
Party	Candidate	Votes	%
Democratic	Lori Love	591	100.00
Total votes		591	100.00

=== General election ===
==== Predictions ====
Source	Ranking
CNalysis	Solid R

==== Results ====
2024 Tennessee House of Representatives District 3 general election
Party	Candidate	Votes	%
Republican	Timothy Aaron Hill (incumbent)	25,634	83.01
Democratic	Lori Love	5,248	16.99
Total votes		30,882	100.00
Republican hold			

== District 4 ==
2024 Tennessee House of Representatives 4th district election
Nominee	Renea Jones
Party	Republican
Popular vote	22,278
Percentage	100.00%
Representative before election
John Holsclaw Jr.
Republican
Elected Representative
Renea Jones
Republican

The 4th district is located in East Tennessee and consists of all of Unicoi County and part of Carter County. It includes the cities of Elizabethton and Erwin. Since 2015, the district has been represented by incumbent Republican John Holsclaw Jr., who chose to retire rather than seek re-election.

=== Republican primary ===
2024 Tennessee House of Representatives District 4 Republican primary
Party	Candidate	Votes	%
Republican	Renea Jones	4,485	68.17
Republican	Curt Alexander	2,094	31.83
Total votes		6,579	100.00

=== General election ===
2024 Tennessee House of Representatives District 4 general election
Party	Candidate	Votes	%
Republican	Renea Jones	22,278	100.00
Total votes		22,278	100.00
Republican hold			

== District 5 ==
2024 Tennessee House of Representatives 5th district election
Nominee	David B. Hawk	Rebecca Anderson
Party	Republican	Independent
Popular vote	24,547	5,383
Percentage	82.01%	17.99%
Representative before election
David B. Hawk
Republican
Elected Representative
David B. Hawk
Republican

The 5th district is located in East Tennessee and consists of all of Greene County. It includes the cities of Tusculum and Greeneville. Incumbent Republican David B. Hawk has represented the district since 2003.

=== Republican primary ===
2024 Tennessee House of Representatives District 5 Republican primary
Party	Candidate	Votes	%
Republican	David B. Hawk (incumbent)	3,580	100.00
Total votes		3,580	100.00

=== General election ===
==== Predictions ====
Source	Ranking
CNalysis	Solid R

==== Results ====
2024 Tennessee House of Representatives District 5 general election
Party	Candidate	Votes	%
Republican	David B. Hawk (incumbent)	24,547	82.01
Independent	Rebecca Anderson	5,383	17.99
Total votes		29,930	100.00
Republican hold			

== District 6 ==
2024 Tennessee House of Representatives 6th district election
Nominee	Tim Hicks	Brad Batt
Party	Republican	Democratic
Popular vote	22,531	8,356
Percentage	72.95%	27.05%
Representative before election
Tim Hicks
Republican
Elected Representative
Tim Hicks
Republican

The 6th district is located in East Tennessee and represents a portion of Washington County, including parts of Johnson City. Incumbent Republican Tim Hicks has represented the district since 2021.

=== Republican primary ===
2024 Tennessee House of Representatives District 6 Republican primary
Party	Candidate	Votes	%
Republican	Tim Hicks (incumbent)	3,312	100.00
Total votes		3,312	100.00

=== Democratic primary ===
2024 Tennessee House of Representatives District 6 Democratic primary
Party	Candidate	Votes	%
Democratic	Brad Batt	1,275	100.00
Total votes		1,275	100.00

=== General election ===
==== Predictions ====
Source	Ranking
CNalysis	Solid R

==== Results ====
2024 Tennessee House of Representatives District 6 general election
Party	Candidate	Votes	%
Republican	Tim Hicks (incumbent)	22,531	72.95
Democratic	Brad Batt	8,356	27.05
Total votes		30,887	100.00
Republican hold			

== District 7 ==
2024 Tennessee House of Representatives 7th district election
Nominee	Rebecca Alexander	Sylvain Bruni
Party	Republican	Democratic
Popular vote	19,016	7,665
Percentage	71.27%	28.73%
Representative before election
Rebecca Alexander
Republican
Elected Representative
Rebecca Alexander
Republican

The 7th district is located in East Tennessee and consists of a portion of Washington County, including all of the city of Jonesborough and parts of Johnson City. Incumbent Republican Rebecca Alexander has represented the district since 2021.

=== Republican primary ===
2024 Tennessee House of Representatives District 7 Republican primary
Party	Candidate	Votes	%
Republican	Rebecca K. Alexander (incumbent)	2,958	100.00%
Total votes		2,958	100.00%

=== Democratic primary ===
2024 Tennessee House of Representatives District 7 Democratic primary
Party	Candidate	Votes	%
Democratic	Sylvain Bruni	1,271	100.00%
Total votes		1,271	100.00%

=== General election ===
==== Predictions ====
Source	Ranking
CNalysis	Solid R

==== Results ====
2024 Tennessee House of Representatives District 7 general election
Party	Candidate	Votes	%
Republican	Rebecca K. Alexander (incumbent)	19,016	71.27%
Democratic	Sylvain Bruni	7,665	28.73%
Total votes		26,681	100.00%
Republican hold			

== District 8 ==
2024 Tennessee House of Representatives 8th district election
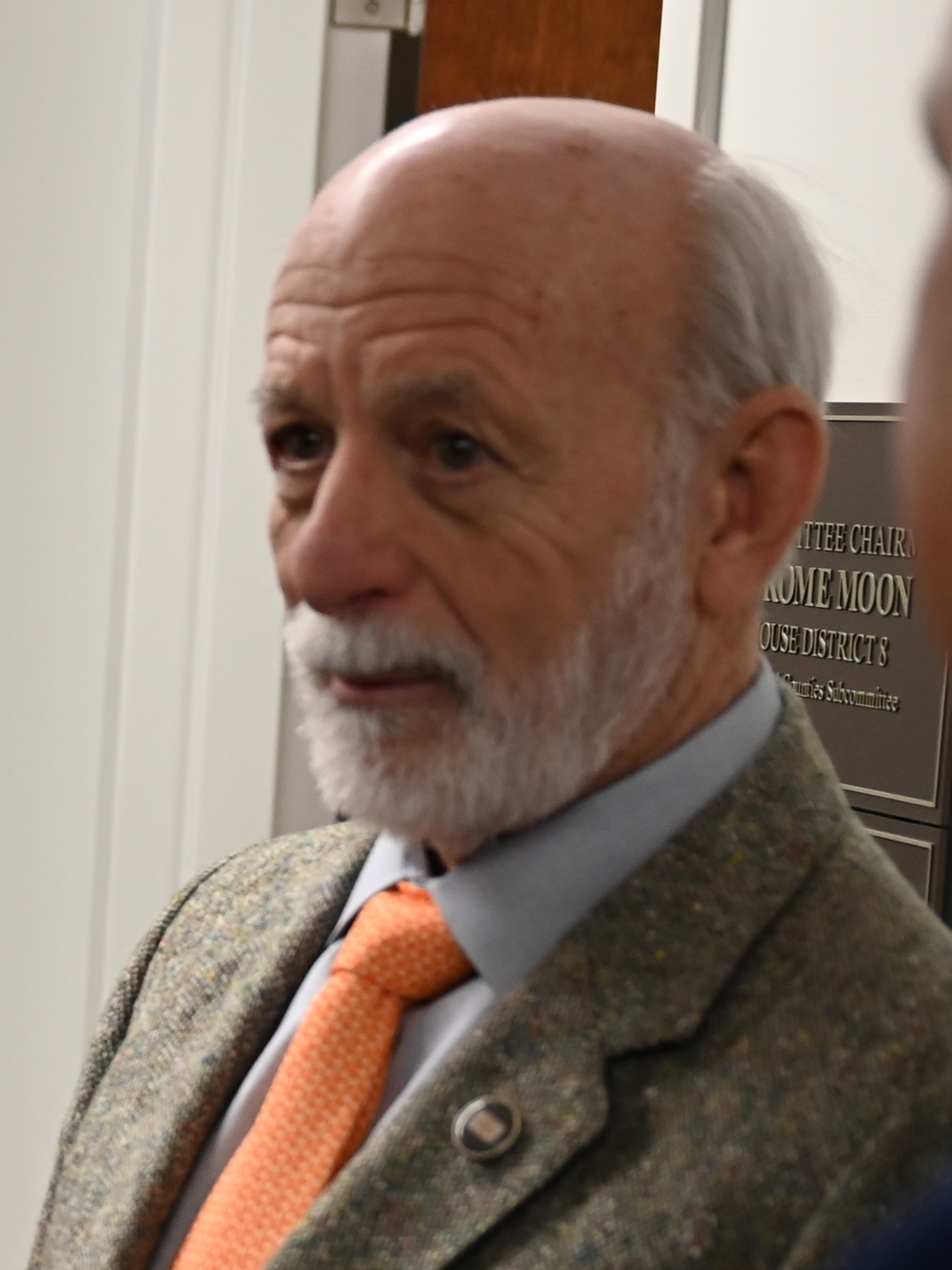

Nominee	Jerome Moon	Sue DuBois
Party	Republican	Democratic
Popular vote	26,450	7,827
Percentage	77.17%	22.83%
Representative before election
Jerome Moon
Republican
Elected Representative
Jerome Moon
Republican

The 8th district is located in East Tennessee and consists of a portion of Blount County, including all of the cities of Townsend and Walland and parts of Maryville and Alcoa. The district also includes a portion of the Great Smoky Mountains National Park. Incumbent Republican Jerome Moon has represented the district since 2017.

=== Republican primary ===
2024 Tennessee House of Representatives District 8 Republican primary
Party	Candidate	Votes	%
Republican	Jerome Moon (incumbent)	5,686	100.00
Total votes		5,686	100.00

=== Democratic primary ===
2024 Tennessee House of Representatives District 8 Democratic primary
Party	Candidate	Votes	%
Democratic	Sue DuBois	1,022	78.74
Democratic	Mac Pickle	276	21.26
Total votes		1,298	100.00

=== General election ===
==== Predictions ====
Source	Ranking
CNalysis	Solid R

==== Results ====
2024 Tennessee House of Representatives District 8 general election
Party	Candidate	Votes	%
Republican	Jerome Moon (incumbent)	26,450	77.17
Democratic	Sue DuBois	7,827	22.83
Total votes		34,277	100.00
Republican hold			

== District 9 ==
2024 Tennessee House of Representatives 9th district election
Nominee	Gary Hicks
Party	Republican
Popular vote	25,336
Percentage	100.00%
Representative before election
Gary Hicks
Republican
Elected Representative
Gary Hicks
Republican

The 9th district is located in East Tennessee and consists of all of Hancock County and parts of Hawkins and Claiborne counties. The district includes the cities of Harrogate, Tazewell, Rogersville, and Church Hill. Incumbent Republican Gary Hicks has represented the district since 2016.

=== Republican primary ===
2024 Tennessee House of Representatives District 9 Republican primary
Party	Candidate	Votes	%
Republican	Gary W. Hicks Jr. (incumbent)	6,107	100.00
Total votes		6,107	100.00

=== General election ===
2024 Tennessee House of Representatives District 9 general election
Party	Candidate	Votes	%
Republican	Gary W. Hicks Jr. (incumbent)	25,336	100.00
Total votes		25,336	100.00
Republican hold			

== District 10 ==
2024 Tennessee House of Representatives 10th district election
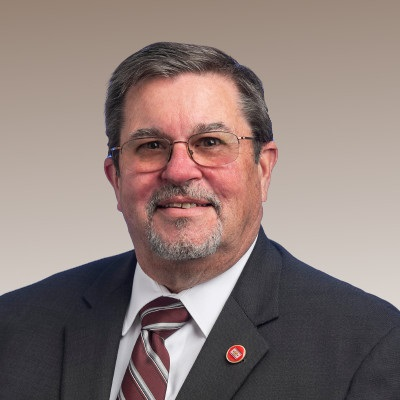
Nominee	Rick Eldridge
Party	Republican
Popular vote	22,293
Percentage	99.06%
Representative before election
Rick Eldridge
Republican
Elected Representative
Rick Eldridge
Republican

The 10th district is located in East Tennessee and consists of all of Grainger County and a portion of Hawkins County. The district includes the cities of Morristown, Rutledge, and Bean Station. Incumbent Republican Rick Eldridge has represented the district since 2019.

=== Republican primary ===
2024 Tennessee House of Representatives District 10 Republican primary
Party	Candidate	Votes	%
Republican	Rick Eldridge (incumbent)	3,197	100.00
Total votes		3,197	100.00

=== General election ===
2024 Tennessee House of Representatives District 10 general election
Party	Candidate	Votes	%
Republican	Rick Eldridge (incumbent)	22,293	99.06
Write-In	Nathan Dressel	212	0.94
Total votes		22,505	100.00
Republican hold			

== District 11 ==
2024 Tennessee House of Representatives 11th district election
Nominee	Jeremy Faison	Justin L. Gross
Party	Republican	Democratic
Popular vote	24,424	4,517
Percentage	84.39%	15.61%
Representative before election
Jeremy Faison
Republican
Elected Representative
Jeremy Faison
Republican

The 11th district is located in East Tennessee and consists of all of Cocke County and portions of Hamblen and Jefferson counties. The district includes all of the cities of Newport, Cosby, and parts of the cities of Jefferson City and Morristown. It also includes a portion of the Great Smoky Mountains National Park. Incumbent Republican Jeremy Faison has represented the district since 2011.

=== Republican primary ===
2024 Tennessee House of Representatives District 11 Republican primary
Party	Candidate	Votes	%
Republican	Jeremy Faison (incumbent)	3,731	100.00
Total votes		3,731	100.00

=== Democratic primary ===
2024 Tennessee House of Representatives District 11 Democratic primary
Party	Candidate	Votes	%
Democratic	Justin L. Gross	426	100.00
Total votes		426	100.00

=== General election ===
==== Predictions ====
Source	Ranking
CNalysis	Solid R

==== Results ====
2024 Tennessee House of Representatives District 11 general election
Party	Candidate	Votes	%
Republican	Jeremy Faison (incumbent)	24,424	84.39
Democratic	Justin L. Gross	4,517	15.61
Total votes		28,941	100.00
Republican hold			

== District 12 ==
2024 Tennessee House of Representatives 12th district election
Nominee	Fred Atchley	Leslie Braddock
Party	Republican	Democratic
Popular vote	23,955	5,196
Percentage	82.18%	17.82%
Representative before election
Dale Carr
Republican
Elected Representative
Fred Atchley
Republican

The 12th district is located in East Tennessee and consists of a portion of Sevier County, including all of the cities of Gatlinburg, Pittman Center, and Pigeon Forge, part of Sevierville. The district also includes a large portion of the Great Smoky Mountains National Park. Since 2013, the district has been represented by Republican Dale Carr, who chose to retire rather than seek re-election.

=== Republican primary ===
2024 Tennessee House of Representatives District 12 Republican primary
Party	Candidate	Votes	%
Republican	Fred A. Atchley	3,401	70.96
Republican	Larry Linton	1,167	24.35
Republican	Christian Gerald Brown	225	4.69
Total votes		4,793	100.00

=== Democratic primary ===
2024 Tennessee House of Representatives District 12 Democratic primary
Party	Candidate	Votes	%
Democratic	Leslie P. Braddock	504	100.00
Total votes		504	100.00

=== General election ===
==== Predictions ====
Source	Ranking
CNalysis	Solid R

==== Results ====
2024 Tennessee House of Representatives District 12 general election
Party	Candidate	Votes	%
Republican	Fred A. Atchley	23,955	82.18
Democratic	Leslie P. Braddock	5,196	17.82
Total votes		29,151	100.00
Republican hold			

== District 13 ==
2024 Tennessee House of Representatives 13th district election
Nominee	Robert Stevens	Jonathan Yancey
Party	Republican	Democratic
Popular vote	16,210	10,859
Percentage	59.88%	40.12%
- County results Stevens: 50–60%
Representative before election
Robert Stevens
Republican
Elected Representative
Robert Stevens
Republican

The 13th district is located in Middle Tennessee and consists of a western strip of Rutherford County and includes portions of the cities of Murfreesboro, Smyrna, La Vergne, and Eagleville. Incumbent Republican Robert Stevens has represented the district since 2023.

=== Republican primary ===
2024 Tennessee House of Representatives District 13 Republican primary
Party	Candidate	Votes	%
Republican	Robert Stevens (incumbent)	2,249	68.65
Republican	Jami K. Averwater	1,027	31.35
Total votes		3,276	100.00

=== Democratic primary ===
2024 Tennessee House of Representatives District 13 Democratic primary
Party	Candidate	Votes	%
Democratic	Jonathan Yancey	1,157	100.00
Total votes		1,157	100.00

=== General election ===
==== Predictions ====
Source	Ranking
CNalysis	Solid R

==== Results ====
2024 Tennessee House of Representatives District 13 general election
Party	Candidate	Votes	%
Republican	Robert Stevens (incumbent)	16,210	59.88
Democratic	Jonathan Yancey	10,859	40.12
Total votes		27,069	100.00
Republican hold			

== District 14 ==
2024 Tennessee House of Representatives 14th district election
Nominee	Jason Zachary	Amanda S. Collins
Party	Republican	Democratic
Popular vote	27,129	14,716
Percentage	64.83%	35.17%
Representative before election
Jason Zachary
Republican
Elected Representative
Jason Zachary
Republican

The 14th district is located in East Tennessee and consists of a southwestern portion of Knox County. It includes most of the city of Farragut and a small part of Knoxville. Incumbent Republican Jason Zachary has represented the district since 2015.

=== Republican primary ===
2024 Tennessee House of Representatives District 14 Republican primary
Party	Candidate	Votes	%
Republican	Jason Zachary (incumbent)	6,582	100.00
Total votes		6,582	100.00

=== Democratic primary ===
2024 Tennessee House of Representatives District 14 Democratic primary
Party	Candidate	Votes	%
Democratic	Amanda S. Collins	3,492	100.00
Total votes		3,492	100.00

=== General election ===
==== Predictions ====
Source	Ranking
CNalysis	Solid R

==== Results ====
2024 Tennessee House of Representatives District 14 general election
Party	Candidate	Votes	%
Republican	Jason Zachary (incumbent)	27,129	64.83
Democratic	Amanda S. Collins	14,716	35.17
Total votes		41,845	100.00
Republican hold			

== District 15 ==
2024 Tennessee House of Representatives 15th district election
Nominee	Sam McKenzie	Justin Hirst
Party	Democratic	Republican
Popular vote	12,281	5,790
Percentage	67.96%	32.04%
Representative before election
Sam McKenzie
Democratic
Elected Representative
Sam McKenzie
Democratic

The 15th district is located in East Tennessee and consists of several neighborhoods in the city of Knoxville, which is in Knox County. It includes Downtown Knoxville, East Knoxville, most of the University of Tennessee, and parts of North Knoxville and South Knoxville. Incumbent Democrat Sam McKenzie has represented the district since 2021.

=== Democratic primary ===
2024 Tennessee House of Representatives District 15 Democratic primary
Party	Candidate	Votes	%
Democratic	Sam McKenzie (incumbent)	2,585	64.88
Democratic	Dasha Lundy	1,399	35.12
Total votes		3,984	100.00

=== Republican primary ===
2024 Tennessee House of Representatives District 15 Republican primary
Party	Candidate	Votes	%
Republican	Justin Hirst	1,175	100.00
Total votes		1,175	100.00

=== General election ===
==== Predictions ====
Source	Ranking
CNalysis	Solid D

==== Results ====
2024 Tennessee House of Representatives District 15 general election
Party	Candidate	Votes	%
Democratic	Sam McKenzie (incumbent)	12,281	67.96
Republican	Justin Hirst	5,790	32.04
Total votes		18,071	100.00
Democratic hold			

== District 16 ==
2024 Tennessee House of Representatives 16th district election
Nominee	Michele Carringer	Lauren Carver
Party	Republican	Democratic
Popular vote	22,376	9,331
Percentage	68.72%	28.66%
Representative before election
Michele Carringer
Republican
Elected Representative
Michele Carringer
Republican

The 16th district is located in East Tennessee and consists of a portion of northwestern Knox County, including the communities of Powell, Halls Crossroads, Heiskell, and a part of North Knoxville. Incumbent Republican Michele Carringer has represented the district since 2021.

=== Republican primary ===
2024 Tennessee House of Representatives District 16 Republican primary
Party	Candidate	Votes	%
Republican	Michele Carringer (incumbent)	4,316	100.00
Total votes		4,316	100.00

=== Democratic primary ===
2024 Tennessee House of Representatives District 16 Democratic primary
Party	Candidate	Votes	%
Democratic	Lauren Carver	2,133	100.00
Total votes		2,133	100.00

=== General election ===
==== Predictions ====
Source	Ranking
CNalysis	Solid R

==== Results ====
2024 Tennessee House of Representatives District 16 general election
Party	Candidate	Votes	%
Republican	Michele Carringer (incumbent)	22,376	68.72
Democratic	Lauren Carver	9,331	28.66
Independent	Sean Eastham	854	2.62
Total votes		32,561	100.00
Republican hold			

== District 17 ==
2024 Tennessee House of Representatives 17th district election
Nominee	Andrew Farmer
Party	Republican
Popular vote	25,047
Percentage	100.00%
Representative before election
Andrew Farmer
Republican
Elected Representative
Andrew Farmer
Republican

The 17th district is located in East Tennessee and consists of a western portion of Jefferson County and a northeastern portion of Sevier County. The district includes the communities of New Market, Dandridge, and Strawberry Plains, and parts of Jefferson City and Sevierville. Incumbent Republican Andrew Farmer has represented the district since 2013.

=== Republican primary ===
2024 Tennessee House of Representatives District 17 Republican primary
Party	Candidate	Votes	%
Republican	Andrew Ellis Farmer (incumbent)	4,428	100.00
Total votes		4,428	100.00

=== General election ===
2024 Tennessee House of Representatives District 17 general election
Party	Candidate	Votes	%
Republican	Andrew Ellis Farmer (incumbent)	25,047	100.00
Total votes		25,047	100.00
Republican hold			

== District 18 ==
2024 Tennessee House of Representatives 18th district election
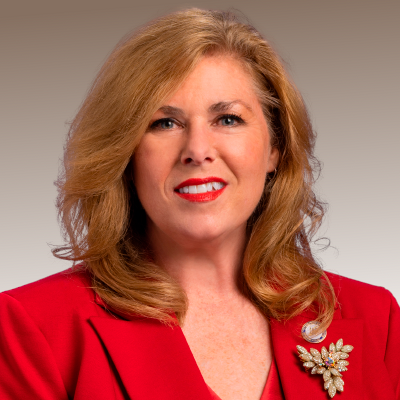

Nominee	Elaine Davis	Bryan Goldberg
Party	Republican	Democratic
Popular vote	18,611	16,013
Percentage	53.75%	46.25%
- County results Davis: 50–60%
Representative before election
Elaine Davis
Republican
Elected Representative
Elaine Davis
Republican

The 18th district is located in East Tennessee and consists of several Knoxville suburbs in southern and western Knox County. The district is situated around I-75 and West Knoxville and includes the communities of Amherst, Cedar Bluff, Rocky Hill, Bearden, Sequoyah Hills, Lakemoor Hills, Topside, Mount Olive, and Bonny Kate. Incumbent Republican Elaine Davis has represented the district since 2023. On the concurrent presidential election, Donald Trump won the district with a margin of 9.5%.

=== Republican primary ===
2024 Tennessee House of Representatives District 18 Republican primary
Party	Candidate	Votes	%
Republican	Elaine Davis (incumbent)	5,161	100.00
Total votes		5,161	100.00

=== Democratic primary ===
2024 Tennessee House of Representatives District 18 Democratic primary
Party	Candidate	Votes	%
Democratic	Bryan Goldberg	4,139	100.00
Total votes		4,139	100.00

=== General election ===
==== Predictions ====
Source	Ranking
CNalysis	Tilt R

==== Results ====
2024 Tennessee House of Representatives District 18 general election
Party	Candidate	Votes	%
Republican	Elaine Davis (incumbent)	18,611	53.75
Democratic	Bryan Goldberg	16,013	46.25
Total votes		34,624	100.00
Republican hold			

== District 19 ==
2024 Tennessee House of Representatives 19th district election
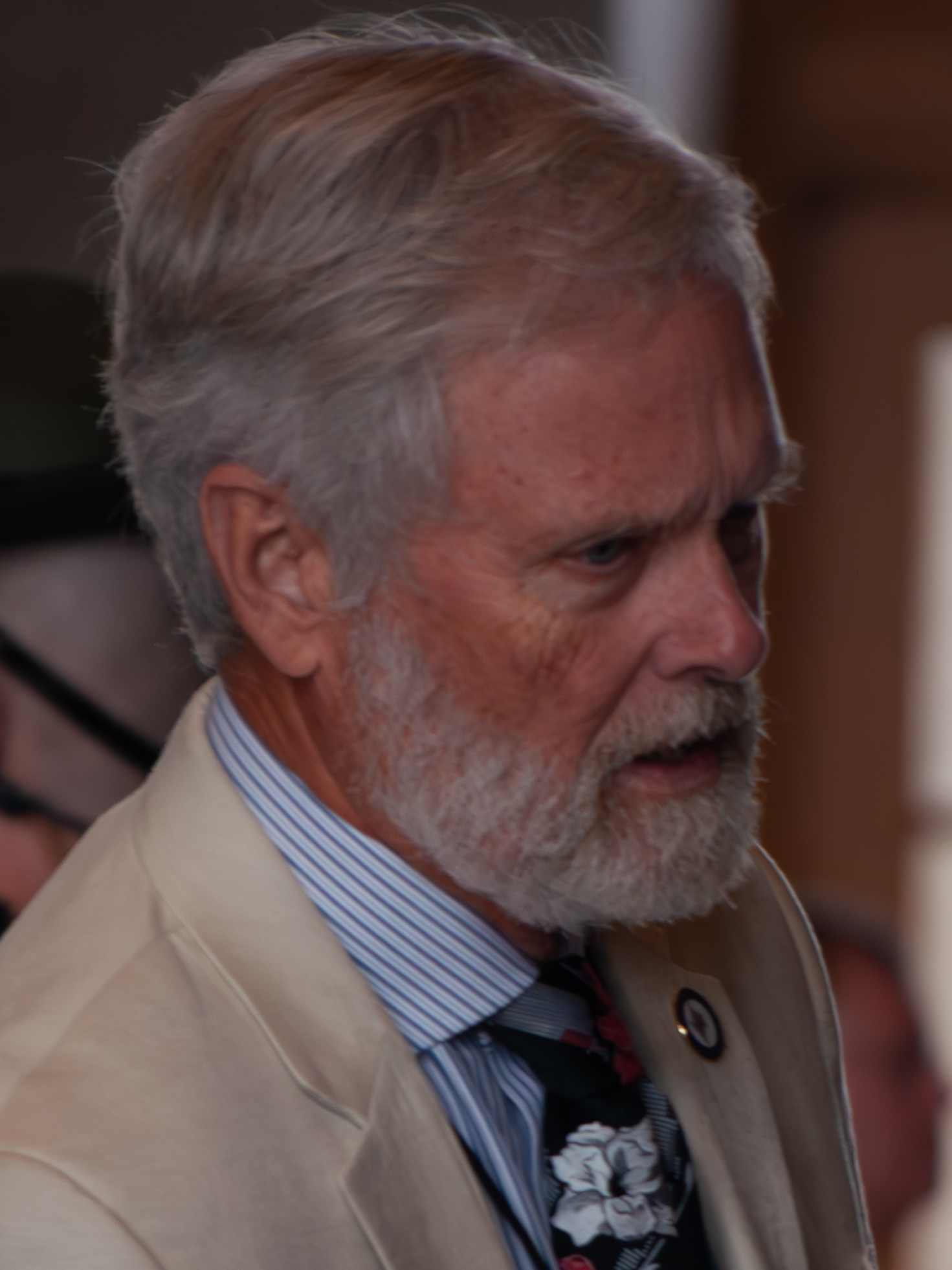
Nominee	Dave Wright
Party	Republican
Popular vote	27,784
Percentage	100.00%
Representative before election
Dave Wright
Republican
Elected Representative
Dave Wright
Republican

The 19th district is located in East Tennessee and consists of a northeastern portion of Knox County. It is the largest and most rural Tennessee House of Representatives district in the county. The district includes the communities of Corryton, Mascot, Asbury, and Harbison Crossroads, and parts of North Knoxville, Halls Crossroads, South Knoxville, and Strawberry Plains. Incumbent Republican Dave Wright has represented the district since 2019.

=== Republican primary ===
2024 Tennessee House of Representatives District 19 Republican primary
Party	Candidate	Votes	%
Republican	Dave Wright (incumbent)	5,162	100.00
Total votes		5,162	100.00

=== Democratic primary ===
2024 Tennessee House of Representatives District 19 Democratic primary
Party	Candidate	Votes	%
Democratic	Michael Leon Daugherty (write-in)	124	100.00
Total votes		124	100.00

=== General election ===
==== Predictions ====
Source	Ranking
CNalysis	Solid R

==== Results ====
2024 Tennessee House of Representatives District 19 general election
Party	Candidate	Votes	%
Republican	Dave Wright (incumbent)	27,784	100.00
Total votes		27,784	100.00
Republican hold			

== District 20 ==
2024 Tennessee House of Representatives 20th district election
Nominee	Tom Stinnett	Karen Gertz
Party	Republican	Democratic
Popular vote	24,704	8,312
Percentage	74.82%	25.18%
Representative before election
Bryan Richey
Republican
Elected Representative
Tom Stinnett
Republican

The 20th district is located in East Tennessee and consists of a northwestern portion of Blount County, including parts of the cities of Maryville, Alcoa, and Louisville. Since 2023, the district has been represented by Republican Bryan Richey, who chose to retire to run for State Senate. Richey ultimately lost in the Republican primary to Tom Hatcher.

=== Republican primary ===
2024 Tennessee House of Representatives District 20 Republican primary
Party	Candidate	Votes	%
Republican	Tom Stinnett	2,352	35.13
Republican	Nick Bright	2,214	33.06
Republican	Jason Emert	2,130	31.81
Total votes		6,696	100.00

=== Democratic primary ===
2024 Tennessee House of Representatives District 20 Democratic primary
Party	Candidate	Votes	%
Democratic	Karen Gertz	1,392	100.00
Total votes		1,392	100.00

=== General election ===
==== Predictions ====
Source	Ranking
CNalysis	Solid R

==== Results ====
2024 Tennessee House of Representatives District 20 general election
Party	Candidate	Votes	%
Republican	Tom Stinnett	24,704	74.82
Democratic	Karen Gertz	8,312	25.18
Total votes		33,016	100.00
Republican hold			

== District 21 ==
2024 Tennessee House of Representatives 21st district election
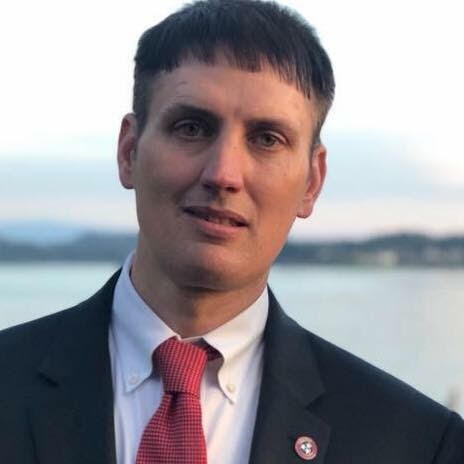

Nominee	Lowell Russell	Kenneth R. Moore
Party	Republican	Democratic
Popular vote	29,929	6,967
Percentage	81.12%	18.88%
Representative before election
Lowell Russell
Republican
Elected Representative
Lowell Russell
Republican

The 21st district is located in East Tennessee and consists of most of Loudon County and a northern portion of Monroe County, including the communities of Tellico Village, Loudon, Vonore, Madisonville, Greenback, and a small part of Lenoir City. Incumbent Republican Lowell Russell has represented the district since 2019.

=== Republican primary ===
2024 Tennessee House of Representatives District 21 Republican primary
Party	Candidate	Votes	%
Republican	Lowell Russell (incumbent)	4,912	100.00
Total votes		4,912	100.00

=== Democratic primary ===
2024 Tennessee House of Representatives District 21 Democratic primary
Party	Candidate	Votes	%
Democratic	Kenneth R. Moore	1,091	100.00
Total votes		1,091	100.00

=== General election ===
==== Predictions ====
Source	Ranking
CNalysis	Solid R

==== Results ====
2024 Tennessee House of Representatives District 21 general election
Party	Candidate	Votes	%
Republican	Lowell Russell (incumbent)	29,929	81.12
Democratic	Kenneth R. Moore	6,967	18.88
Total votes		36,896	100.00
Republican hold			

== District 22 ==
2024 Tennessee House of Representatives 22nd district election
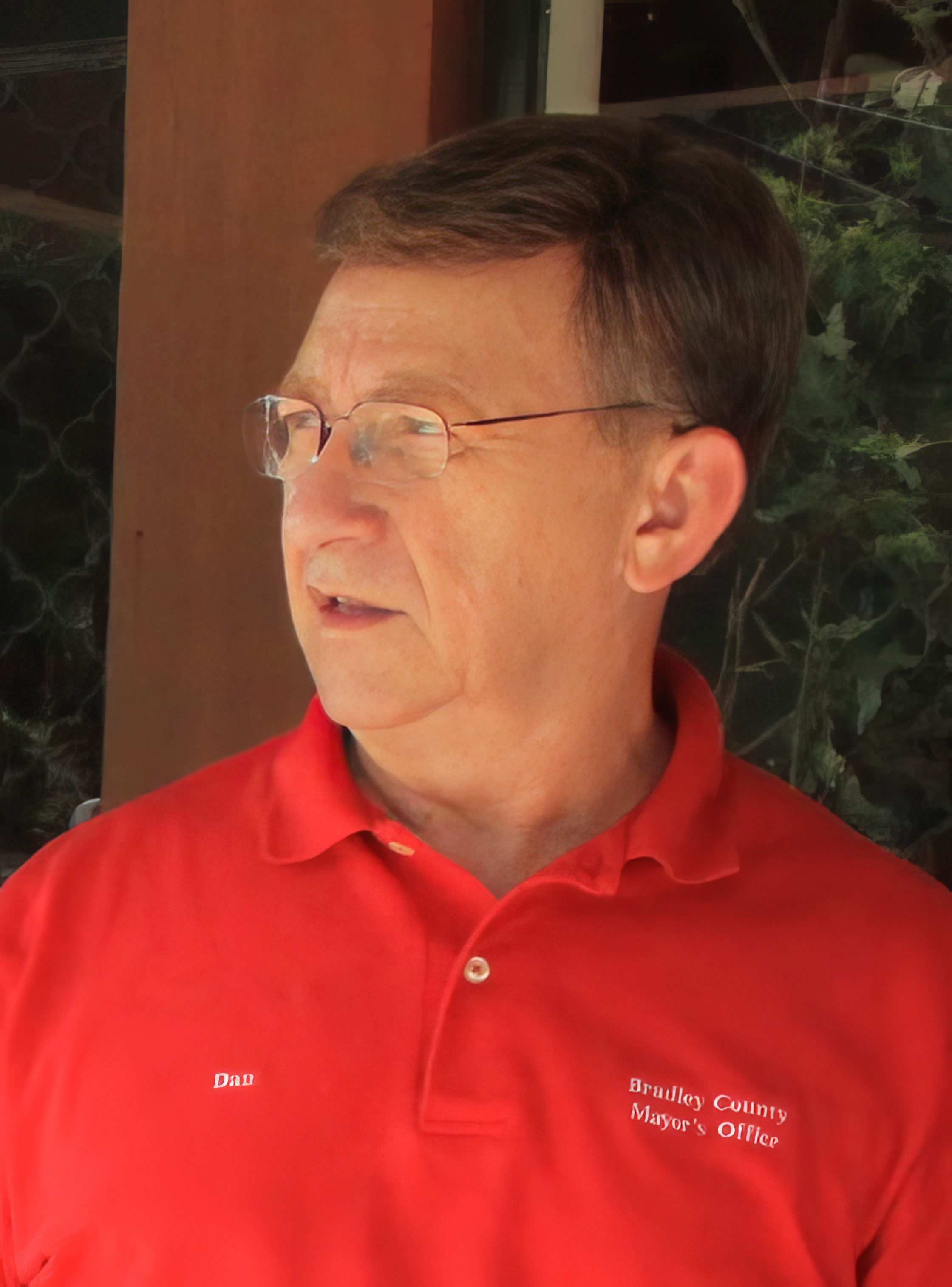

Nominee	Dan Howell	Anna Grabowski
Party	Republican	Democratic
Popular vote	27,463	4,773
Percentage	85.19%	14.81%
Representative before election
Dan Howell
Republican
Elected Representative
Dan Howell
Republican

The 22nd district is located in East Tennessee and consists of all of Meigs and Polk counties and most of Bradley County surrounding the city of Cleveland. It includes the communities of Charleston, Decatur, Benton, Ten Mile, and Ducktown, as well as the intersection of the borders of Tennessee, Georgia, and North Carolina. Incumbent Republican Dan Howell has represented the district since 2013.

=== Republican primary ===
2024 Tennessee House of Representatives District 22 Republican primary
Party	Candidate	Votes	%
Republican	Dan Howell (incumbent)	3,699	100.00
Total votes		3,699	100.00

=== Democratic primary ===
2024 Tennessee House of Representatives District 22 Democratic primary
Party	Candidate	Votes	%
Democratic	Anna Grabowski	366	60.30
Democratic	Stan Hurder	241	39.70
Total votes		607	100.00

=== General election ===
==== Predictions ====
Source	Ranking
CNalysis	Solid R

==== Results ====
2024 Tennessee House of Representatives District 22 general election
Party	Candidate	Votes	%
Republican	Dan Howell (incumbent)	27,463	85.19
Democratic	Anna Grabowski	4,773	14.81
Total votes		32,236	100.00
Republican hold			

== District 23 ==
2024 Tennessee House of Representatives 23rd district election
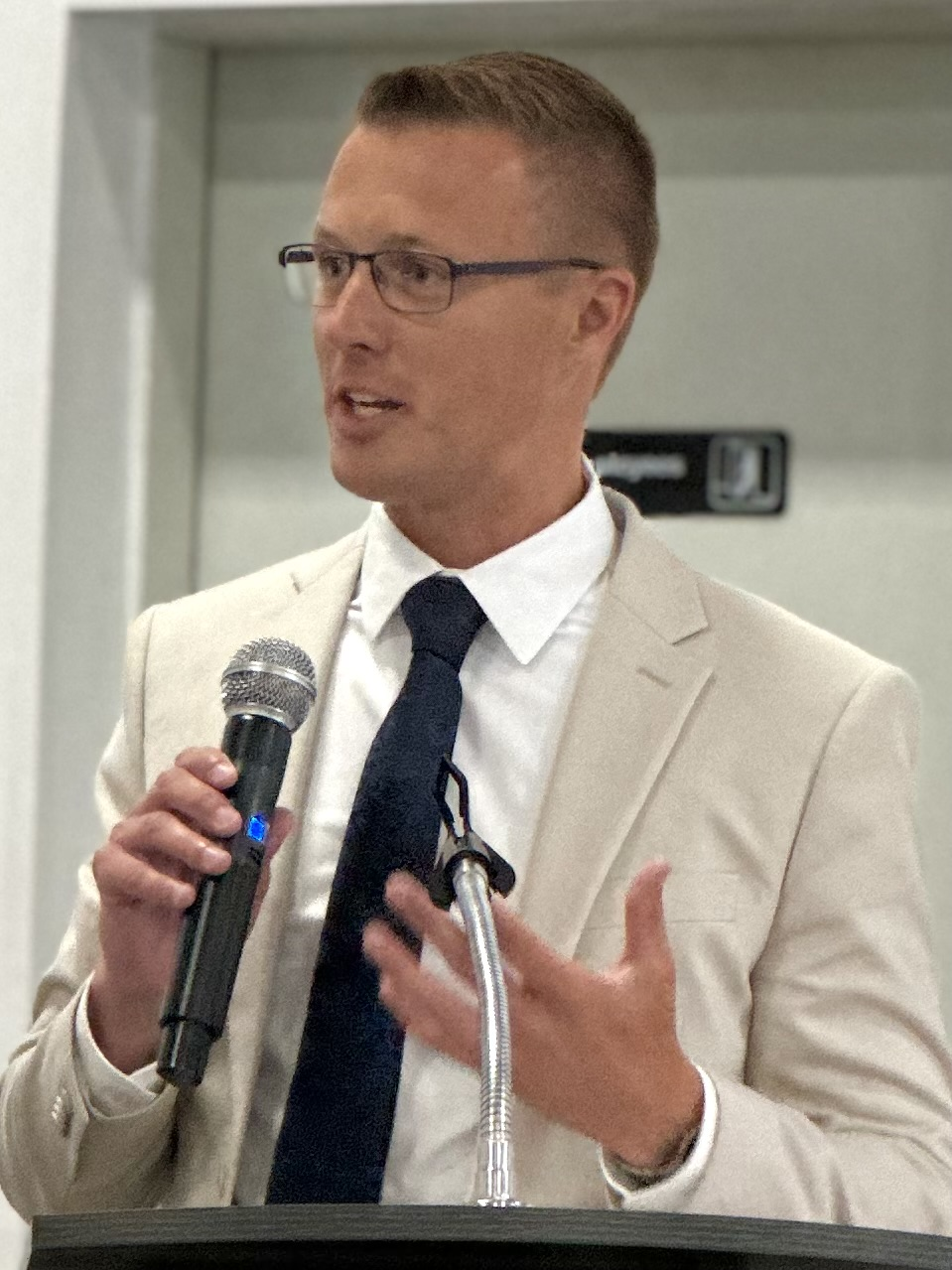

Nominee	Mark Cochran	David W. Thomforde
Party	Republican	Democratic
Popular vote	25,265	4,470
Percentage	84.97%	15.03%
- Cochran: 80–90%
Representative before election
Mark Cochran
Republican
Elected Representative
Mark Cochran
Republican

The 23rd district is located in East Tennessee and consists of all of McMinn County and a large southern portion of Monroe County. The district includes the communities of Tellico Plains, Englewood, Niota, and Etowah. It also includes a large section of Cherokee National Forest on the Tennessee-North Carolina border. Incumbent Republican Mark Cochran has represented the district since 2019.

=== Republican primary ===
2024 Tennessee House of Representatives District 23 Republican primary
Party	Candidate	Votes	%
Republican	Mark Cochran (incumbent)	2,476	100.00
Total votes		2,476	100.00

=== Democratic primary ===
2024 Tennessee House of Representatives District 23 Democratic primary
Party	Candidate	Votes	%
Democratic	David W. Thomforde	446	100.00
Total votes		446	100.00

=== General election ===
==== Predictions ====
Source	Ranking
CNalysis	Solid R

==== Results ====
2024 Tennessee House of Representatives District 23 general election
Party	Candidate	Votes	%
Republican	Mark Cochran (incumbent)	25,265	84.97
Democratic	David W. Thomforde	4,470	15.03
Total votes		29,735	100.00
Republican hold			

== District 24 ==
2024 Tennessee House of Representatives 24th district election
Nominee	Kevin Raper	Andrea Chase
Party	Republican	Democratic
Popular vote	20,826	5,769
Percentage	78.31%	21.69%
Representative before election
Kevin Raper
Republican
Elected Representative
Kevin Raper
Republican

The 24th district is located in East Tennessee and consists of the city Cleveland and some of the surrounding communities in central Bradley County. Incumbent Republican Kevin Raper has represented the district since 2023.

=== Republican primary ===
2024 Tennessee House of Representatives District 24 Republican primary
Party	Candidate	Votes	%
Republican	Kevin Raper (incumbent)	2,441	57.60
Republican	Troy Weathers	1,797	42.40
Total votes		4,238	100.00

=== Democratic primary ===
2024 Tennessee House of Representatives District 24 Democratic primary
Party	Candidate	Votes	%
Democratic	Andrea Chase	590	100.00
Total votes		590	100.00

=== General election ===
==== Predictions ====
Source	Ranking
CNalysis	Solid R

==== Results ====
2024 Tennessee House of Representatives District 24 general election
Party	Candidate	Votes	%
Republican	Kevin Raper (incumbent)	20,826	78.31
Democratic	Andrea Chase	5,769	21.69
Total votes		26,595	100.00
Republican hold			

== District 25 ==
2024 Tennessee House of Representatives 25th district election
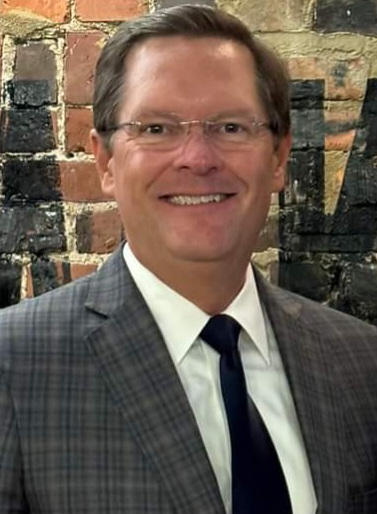

Nominee	Cameron Sexton	Wesley M. Adkins
Party	Republican	Democratic
Popular vote	29,725	6,603
Percentage	81.82%	18.18%
- Sexton: 80–90%
Representative before election
Cameron Sexton
Republican
Elected Representative
Cameron Sexton
Republican

The 25th district is located between East and Middle Tennessee and consists of all of Cumberland County and the eastern half of Putnam County. The district includes the cities of Crossville, Fairfield Glade, Lake Tansi, and Monterey. Incumbent Republican Speaker of the Tennessee House of Representatives Cameron Sexton has represented the district since 2011.

=== Republican primary ===
2024 Tennessee House of Representatives District 25 Republican primary
Party	Candidate	Votes	%
Republican	Cameron Sexton (incumbent)	3,675	100.00
Total votes		3,675	100.00

=== Democratic primary ===
2024 Tennessee House of Representatives District 25 Democratic primary
Party	Candidate	Votes	%
Democratic	Wesley M. Adkins	828	100.00
Total votes		828	100.00

=== General election ===
==== Predictions ====
Source	Ranking
CNalysis	Solid R

==== Results ====
2024 Tennessee House of Representatives District 25 general election
Party	Candidate	Votes	%
Republican	Cameron Sexton (incumbent)	29,725	81.82
Democratic	Wesley M. Adkins	6,603	18.18
Total votes		36,328	100.00
Republican hold			

== District 26 ==
2024 Tennessee House of Representatives 26th district election
Nominee	Greg Martin	Allison Gorman
Party	Republican	Democratic
Popular vote	24,582	14,986
Percentage	62.13%	37.87%
Representative before election
Greg Martin
Republican
Elected Representative
Greg Martin
Republican

The 26th district is located in East Tennessee and consists of a central strip of Hamilton County running from Sale Creek in the north, through Middle Valley, Lakesite, and Harrison, down to downtown Chattanooga in the south. Incumbent Republican Greg Martin has represented the district since 2023.

=== Republican primary ===
2024 Tennessee House of Representatives District 26 Republican primary
Party	Candidate	Votes	%
Republican	Greg Martin (incumbent)	4,116	100.00
Total votes		4,116	100.00

=== Democratic primary ===
2024 Tennessee House of Representatives District 26 Democratic primary
Party	Candidate	Votes	%
Democratic	Allison Gorman	2,440	100.00
Total votes		2,440	100.00

=== General election ===
==== Predictions ====
Source	Ranking
CNalysis	Solid R

==== Results ====
2024 Tennessee House of Representatives District 26 general election
Party	Candidate	Votes	%
Republican	Greg Martin (incumbent)	24,582	62.13
Democratic	Allison Gorman	14,986	37.87
Total votes		39,568	100.00
Republican hold			

== District 27 ==
2024 Tennessee House of Representatives 27th district election
Nominee	Michele Reneau	Kathy Lennon
Party	Republican	Democratic
Popular vote	23,085	15,276
Percentage	60.18%	39.82%
Representative before election
Patsy Hazlewood
Republican
Elected Representative
Michele Reneau
Republican

The 27th district is located in East Tennessee and consists of a western strip of Hamilton County running from Sale Creek in the north, through Soddy-Daisy, Signal Mountain, Red Bank, and parts of western Chattanooga, down to Lookout Mountain on the Tennessee-Georgia border in the south. Since 2014, the district has been represented by Incumbent Republican Patsy Hazlewood, who was defeated in the Republican primary by Michele Reneau in a major upset.

=== Republican primary ===
==== Endorsements ====
Patsy Hazlewood
- Marsha Blackburn, United States Senator from Tennessee (2019–present), United States Representative from Tennessee's 7th congressional district (2003–2019), Tennessee state senator from the 23rd district (1999–2003)
- Bill Haslam, governor of Tennessee (2011–2019), mayor of Knoxville, Tennessee (2003–2011)
- Bill Lee, governor of Tennessee (2019–present)
- Bo Watson, state senator from the 11th district (2011–present)
Michele Reneau
- Tennessee Conservative News

==== Results ====
Republican primary results by precinct Reneau: 50–60% 60–70% >90%; Hazlewood: 50–60% 60–70% 70–80%

2024 Tennessee House of Representatives District 27 Republican primary
Party	Candidate	Votes	%
Republican	Michele Reneau	4,082	50.86
Republican	Patsy Hazlewood (incumbent)	3,944	49.14
Total votes		8,026	100.00

=== Democratic primary ===
2024 Tennessee House of Representatives District 27 Democratic primary
Party	Candidate	Votes	%
Democratic	Kathy Lennon	2,746	100.00
Total votes		2,746	100.00

=== General election ===
==== Predictions ====
Source	Ranking
CNalysis	Solid R

==== Results ====
2024 Tennessee House of Representatives District 27 general election
Party	Candidate	Votes	%
Republican	Michele Reneau	23,085	60.18
Democratic	Kathy Lennon	15,276	39.82
Total votes		38,361	100.00
Republican hold			

== District 28 ==
2024 Tennessee House of Representatives 28th district election
Nominee	Yusuf Hakeem	Thomas J. Brooks III
Party	Democratic	Independent
Popular vote	17,735	5,946
Percentage	74.89%	25.11%
Representative before election
Yusuf Hakeem
Democratic
Elected Representative
Yusuf Hakeem
Democratic

The 28th district is located in East Tennessee and consists of most of downtown Chattanooga in Hamilton County. Incumbent Democrat Yusuf Hakeem has represented the district since 2019.

=== Democratic primary ===
2024 Tennessee House of Representatives District 28 Democratic primary
Party	Candidate	Votes	%
Democratic	Yusuf A. Hakeem (incumbent)	3,165	63.34
Democratic	Demetrus Coonrod	1,832	36.66
Total votes		4,997	100.00

=== General election ===
==== Predictions ====
Source	Ranking
CNalysis	Solid D

==== Results ====
2024 Tennessee House of Representatives District 28 general election
Party	Candidate	Votes	%
Democratic	Yusuf A. Hakeem (incumbent)	17,735	74.89
Independent	Thomas J. Brooks III	5,946	25.11
Total votes		23,681	100.00
Democratic hold			

== District 29 ==
2024 Tennessee House of Representatives 29th district election
Nominee	Greg Vital	Ryan Scofield
Party	Republican	Democratic
Popular vote	25,690	10,671
Percentage	70.65%	29.35%
Representative before election
Greg Vital
Republican
Elected Representative
Greg Vital
Republican

The 29th district is located in East Tennessee and consists of an eastern strip of Hamilton County running from Birchwood in the north, through Harrison, down to Collegedale and eastern Chattanooga in the south. Incumbent Republican Greg Vital has represented the district since 2021.

=== Republican primary ===
2024 Tennessee House of Representatives District 29 Republican primary
Party	Candidate	Votes	%
Republican	Greg Vital (incumbent)	3,622	100.00
Total votes		3,622	100.00

=== Democratic primary ===
2024 Tennessee House of Representatives District 29 Democratic primary
Party	Candidate	Votes	%
Democratic	Ryan Scofield	1,378	100.00
Total votes		1,378	100.00

=== General election ===
==== Predictions ====
Source	Ranking
CNalysis	Solid R

==== Results ====
2024 Tennessee House of Representatives District 29 general election
Party	Candidate	Votes	%
Republican	Greg Vital (incumbent)	25,690	70.65
Democratic	Ryan Scofield	10,671	29.35
Total votes		36,361	100.00
Republican hold			

== District 30 ==
2024 Tennessee House of Representatives 30th district election
Nominee	Esther Helton-Haynes	Heather McClendon
Party	Republican	Democratic
Popular vote	19,473	13,136
Percentage	59.72%	40.28%
- County results Helton-Haynes: 50–60%
Representative before election
Esther Helton-Haynes
Republican
Elected Representative
Esther Helton-Haynes
Republican

The 30th district is located in East Tennessee and consists of a southern strip of Hamilton County along the Tennessee-Georgia border, running from Apison in the east, through Collegedale and East Ridge, over to Chattanooga in the west. Incumbent Republican Esther Helton-Haynes has represented the district since 2019. On the concurrent presidential election, Donald Trump won the district with a margin of 15.6%.

=== Republican primary ===
2024 Tennessee House of Representatives District 30 Republican primary
Party	Candidate	Votes	%
Republican	Esther Helton-Haynes (incumbent)	3,030	100.00
Total votes		3,030	100.00

=== Democratic primary ===
2024 Tennessee House of Representatives District 30 Democratic primary
Party	Candidate	Votes	%
Democratic	Heather McClendon	1,974	100.00
Total votes		1,974	100.00

=== General election ===
==== Predictions ====
Source	Ranking
CNalysis	Solid R

==== Results ====
2024 Tennessee House of Representatives District 30 general election
Party	Candidate	Votes	%
Republican	Esther Helton-Haynes (incumbent)	19,473	59.72
Democratic	Heather McClendon	13,136	40.28
Total votes		32,609	100.00
Republican hold			

== District 31 ==
2024 Tennessee House of Representatives 31st district election
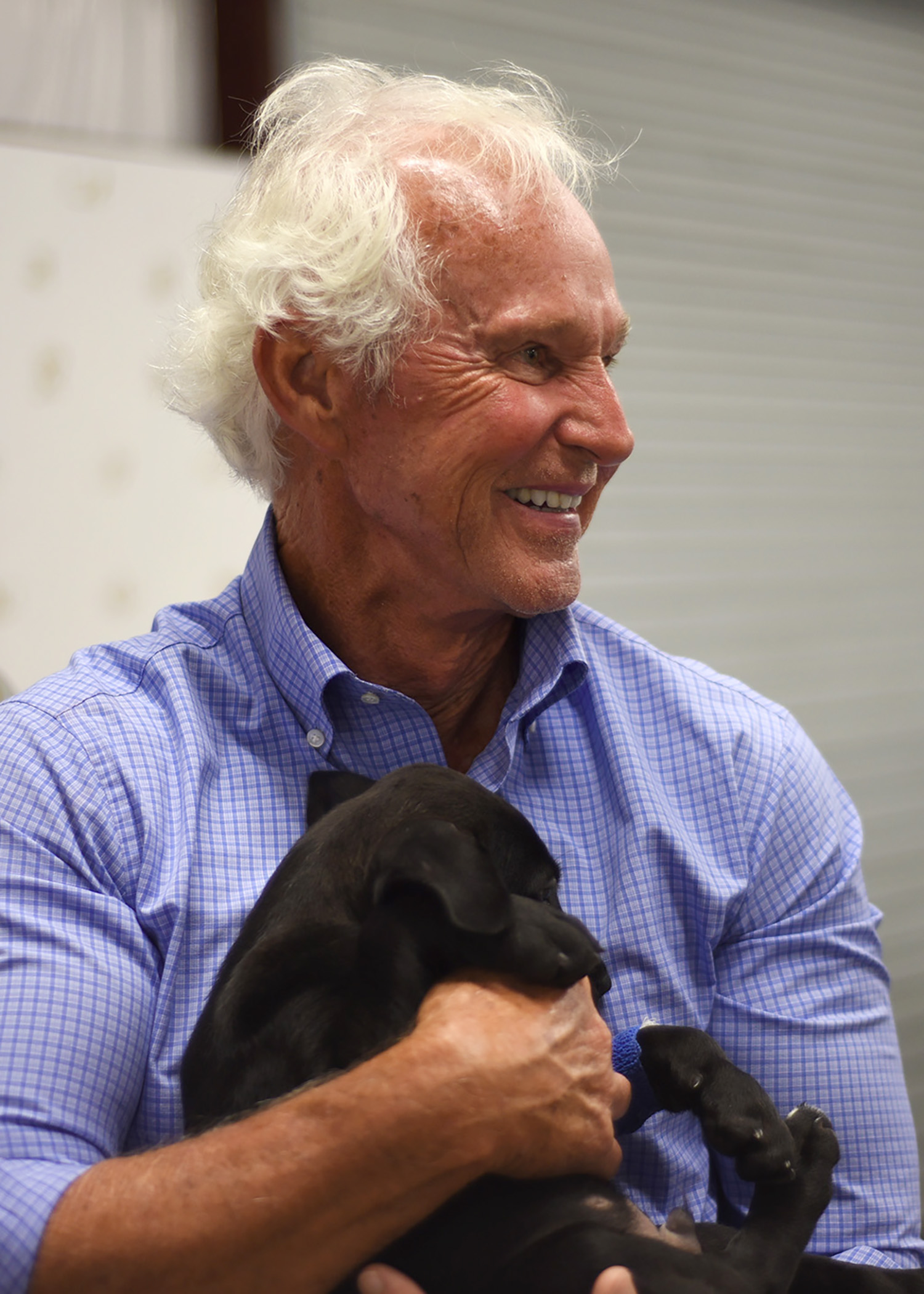

Nominee	Ron Travis	Brittany Lynn Warfel
Party	Republican	Democratic
Popular vote	25,429	4,094
Percentage	83.83%	13.50%
Representative before election
Ron Travis
Republican
Elected Representative
Ron Travis
Republican

The 31st district is located between East and Middle Tennessee and consists of the entirety of Rhea, Bledsoe, Van Buren, and Sequatchie counties. The district includes the cities of Spencer, Spring City, Pikeville, Dayton, and Lone Oak. Incumbent Republican Ron Travis has represented the district since 2013.

=== Republican primary ===
2024 Tennessee House of Representatives District 31 Republican primary
Party	Candidate	Votes	%
Republican	Ron Travis (incumbent)	3,394	64.59
Republican	Richard W. Smith	1,861	35.41
Total votes		5,255	100.00

=== Democratic primary ===
2024 Tennessee House of Representatives District 31 Democratic primary
Party	Candidate	Votes	%
Democratic	Brittany Lynn Warfel	570	100.00
Total votes		570	100.00

=== General election ===
==== Predictions ====
Source	Ranking
CNalysis	Solid R

==== Results ====
2024 Tennessee House of Representatives District 31 general election
Party	Candidate	Votes	%
Republican	Ron Travis (incumbent)	25,429	83.83
Democratic	Brittany Lynn Warfel	4,094	13.50
Independent	William "Jay" Jenkins	810	2.67
Total votes		30,333	100.00
Republican hold			

== District 32 ==
2024 Tennessee House of Representatives 32nd district election
Nominee	Monty Fritts
Party	Republican
Popular vote	29,444
Percentage	100.00%
Representative before election
Monty Fritts
Republican
Elected Representative
Monty Fritts
Republican

The 32nd district is located in East Tennessee and consists of most of Roane County and a small part of northeastern Loudon County. The district includes most of Lenoir City, all of Kingston, Harriman, and Rockwood, and the Roane County portion of Oak Ridge. Additionally, district is home to Oak Ridge National Laboratory. Incumbent Republican Monty Fritts has represented the district since 2023.

=== Republican primary ===
2024 Tennessee House of Representatives District 32 Republican primary
Party	Candidate	Votes	%
Republican	Monty G. Fritts (incumbent)	6,575	100.00
Total votes		6,575	100.00

=== General election ===
2024 Tennessee House of Representatives District 32 general election
Party	Candidate	Votes	%
Republican	Monty G. Fritts (incumbent)	29,444	100.00
Total votes		29,444	100.00
Republican hold			

== District 33 ==
2024 Tennessee House of Representatives 33rd district election
Nominee	Rick Scarbrough	Anne Backus
Party	Republican	Democratic
Popular vote	20,299	9,685
Percentage	67.70%	32.30%
Representative before election
John Ragan
Republican
Elected Representative
Rick Scarbrough
Republican

The 33rd district is located in East Tennessee and consists of most of Anderson County. The district includes all of Briceville, most of Clinton, roughly half of Rocky Top, and the Anderson County portions of Oak Ridge and Oliver Springs. Since 2011, the district has been represented by Incumbent Republican John Ragan, who was defeated in the Republican primary by Rick Scarbrough.

=== Republican primary ===
Republican primary results by precinct Scarbrough: 50–60% 60–70%; Ragan: 50–60%

2024 Tennessee House of Representatives District 33 Republican primary
Party	Candidate	Votes	%
Republican	Rick Scarbrough	2,963	52.28
Republican	John D. Ragan (incumbent)	2,705	47.72
Total votes		5,668	100.00

=== Democratic primary ===
2024 Tennessee House of Representatives District 33 Democratic primary
Party	Candidate	Votes	%
Democratic	Anne Backus	2,381	100.00
Total votes		2,381	100.00

=== General election ===
==== Predictions ====
Source	Ranking
CNalysis	Solid R

==== Results ====
2024 Tennessee House of Representatives District 33 general election
Party	Candidate	Votes	%
Republican	Rick Scarbrough	20,299	67.70
Democratic	Anne Backus	9,685	32.30
Total votes		29,984	100.00
Republican hold			

== District 34 ==
2024 Tennessee House of Representatives 34th district election
Nominee	Tim Rudd	Amelia Pant
Party	Republican	Democratic
Popular vote	17,805	11,624
Percentage	60.50%	39.50%
Representative before election
Tim Rudd
Republican
Elected Representative
Tim Rudd
Republican

The 34th district is located in Middle Tennessee and consists of a south-central portion of Rutherford County. The district includes large parts of the cities of Murfreesboro, Rockvale, Christiana, and Eagleville. Incumbent Republican Tim Rudd has represented the district since 2017.

=== Republican primary ===
2024 Tennessee House of Representatives District 34 Republican primary
Party	Candidate	Votes	%
Republican	Tim Rudd (incumbent)	2,196	64.04
Republican	Tucker Marcum	1,233	35.96
Total votes		3,429	100.00

=== Democratic primary ===
2024 Tennessee House of Representatives District 34 Democratic primary
Party	Candidate	Votes	%
Democratic	Amelia Pant	1,547	100.00
Total votes		1,547	100.00

=== General election ===
==== Predictions ====
Source	Ranking
CNalysis	Solid R

==== Results ====
2024 Tennessee House of Representatives District 34 general election
Party	Candidate	Votes	%
Republican	Tim Rudd (incumbent)	17,805	60.50
Democratic	Amelia Pant	11,624	39.50
Total votes		29,429	100.00
Republican hold			

== District 35 ==
2024 Tennessee House of Representatives 35th district election
Nominee	William Slater	Lexi Melton
Party	Republican	Democratic
Popular vote	20,190	8,345
Percentage	70.76%	29.24%
Representative before election
William Slater
Republican
Elected Representative
William Slater
Republican

The 35th district is located in Middle Tennessee and consists of all of Trousdale County and a southeastern portion of Sumner County. The district includes all of the cities of Castalian Springs and Hartsville, roughly half of Gallatin, and small parts of Hendersonville and Bethpage. Incumbent Republican William Slater has represented the district since 2023.

=== Republican primary ===
2024 Tennessee House of Representatives District 35 Republican primary
Party	Candidate	Votes	%
Republican	William H. Slater (incumbent)	4,864	100.00
Total votes		4,864	100.00

=== Democratic primary ===
2024 Tennessee House of Representatives District 35 Democratic primary
Party	Candidate	Votes	%
Democratic	Lexi Melton	1,084	100.00
Total votes		1,084	100.00

=== General election ===
==== Predictions ====
Source	Ranking
CNalysis	Solid R

==== Results ====
2024 Tennessee House of Representatives District 35 general election
Party	Candidate	Votes	%
Republican	William H. Slater (incumbent)	20,190	70.76
Democratic	Lexi Melton	8,345	29.24
Total votes		28,535	100.00
Republican hold			

== District 36 ==
2024 Tennessee House of Representatives 36th district election
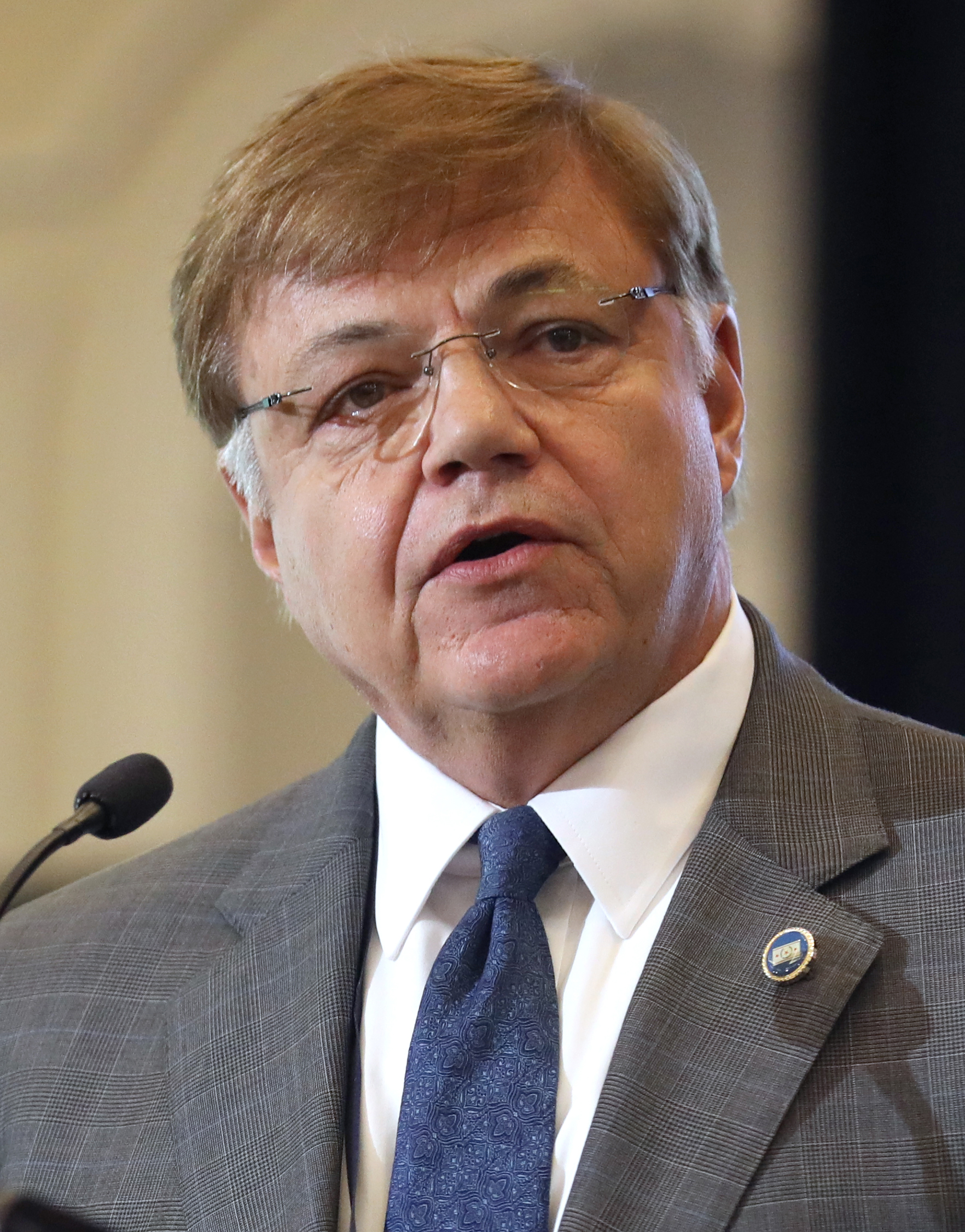
Nominee	Dennis Powers
Party	Republican
Popular vote	24,118
Percentage	100.00%
Representative before election
Dennis Powers
Republican
Elected Representative
Dennis Powers
Republican

The 36th district is located in East Tennessee and consists of all of Union and Campbell counties, and the western half of Claiborne County. The district includes the cities of Maynardville, New Tazewell, La Follette, Jellico, Jacksboro, and Caryville. Incumbent Republican Dennis Powers has represented the district since 2011.

=== Republican primary ===
2024 Tennessee House of Representatives District 36 Republican primary
Party	Candidate	Votes	%
Republican	Dennis Powers (incumbent)	6,516	100.00
Total votes		6,516	100.00

=== General election ===
2024 Tennessee House of Representatives District 36 general election
Party	Candidate	Votes	%
Republican	Dennis Powers (incumbent)	24,118	100.00
Total votes		24,118	100.00
Republican hold			

== District 37 ==
2024 Tennessee House of Representatives 37th district election
Nominee	Charlie Baum	Cheri Brown
Party	Republican	Democratic
Popular vote	16,859	9,399
Percentage	64.21%	35.79%
Representative before election
Charlie Baum
Republican
Elected Representative
Charlie Baum
Republican

The 37th district is located in Middle Tennessee and consists of a north-central strip of Rutherford County and includes portions of the cities of Murfreesboro, Smyrna, and Walterhill. Incumbent Republican Charlie Baum has represented the district since 2019.

=== Republican primary ===
2024 Tennessee House of Representatives District 37 Republican primary
Party	Candidate	Votes	%
Republican	Charlie Baum (incumbent)	2,487	100.00
Total votes		2,487	100.00

=== Democratic primary ===
2024 Tennessee House of Representatives District 37 Democratic primary
Party	Candidate	Votes	%
Democratic	Cheri Brown	1,291	100.00
Total votes		1,291	100.00

=== General election ===
==== Predictions ====
Source	Ranking
CNalysis	Solid R

==== Results ====
2024 Tennessee House of Representatives District 37 general election
Party	Candidate	Votes	%
Republican	Charlie Baum (incumbent)	16,859	64.21
Democratic	Cheri Brown	9,399	35.79
Total votes		26,258	100.00
Republican hold			

== District 38 ==
2024 Tennessee House of Representatives 38th district election
Nominee	Kelly Keisling	Alexander Armor
Party	Republican	Independent
Popular vote	24,785	3,130
Percentage	88.79%	11.21%
Representative before election
Kelly Keisling
Republican
Elected Representative
Kelly Keisling
Republican

The 38th district is located between East and Middle Tennessee and consists of a strip of counties stretching along the Kentucky-Tennessee border, including all of Scott, Pickett, Clay, and Macon counties, and the northern half of Fentress County. The district includes the cities of Oneida, Lafayette, Red Boiling Springs, Huntsville, and part of Jamestown. Incumbent Republican Kelly Keisling has represented the district since 2011.

=== Republican primary ===
2024 Tennessee House of Representatives District 38 Republican primary
Party	Candidate	Votes	%
Republican	Kelly T. Keisling (incumbent)	4,641	100.00
Total votes		4,641	100.00

=== General election ===
==== Predictions ====
Source	Ranking
CNalysis	Solid R

==== Results ====
2024 Tennessee House of Representatives District 38 general election
Party	Candidate	Votes	%
Republican	Kelly T. Keisling (incumbent)	24,785	88.79
Independent	Alexander Armor	3,130	11.21
Total votes		27,915	100.00
Republican hold			

== District 39 ==
2024 Tennessee House of Representatives 39th district election
Nominee	Iris Rudder	Rose Mary Drake
Party	Republican	Democratic
Popular vote	24,655	7,632
Percentage	76.36%	23.64%
Representative before election
Iris Rudder
Republican
Elected Representative
Iris Rudder
Republican

The 39th district is located between East and Middle Tennessee and consists two counties on the Georgia-Tennessee border: Marion County and Franklin County. The district includes the cities of Winchester, Jasper, South Pittsburg, and Sewanee. The district is also home to The University of the South. Incumbent Republican Iris Rudder has represented the district since 2019.

=== Republican primary ===
2024 Tennessee House of Representatives District 39 Republican primary
Party	Candidate	Votes	%
Republican	Iris Rudder (incumbent)	3,114	100.00
Total votes		3,114	100.00

=== Democratic primary ===
2024 Tennessee House of Representatives District 39 Democratic primary
Party	Candidate	Votes	%
Democratic	Rose Mary Drake	1,072	100.00
Total votes		1,072	100.00

=== General election ===
==== Predictions ====
Source	Ranking
CNalysis	Solid R

==== Results ====
2024 Tennessee House of Representatives District 39 general election
Party	Candidate	Votes	%
Republican	Iris Rudder (incumbent)	24,655	76.36
Democratic	Rose Mary Drake	7,632	23.64
Total votes		32,287	100.00
Republican hold			

== District 40 ==
2024 Tennessee House of Representatives 40th district election
Nominee	Michael Hale	Daniel T. Hawthorne
Party	Republican	Democratic
Popular vote	25,287	4,913
Percentage	83.73%	16.27%
Representative before election
Michael Hale
Republican
Elected Representative
Michael Hale
Republican

The 40th district is located in Middle Tennessee and consists of all of Jackson, Smith, DeKalb, and Cannon counties, and a very small portion of northeastern Wilson County. The district includes the cities of Smithville, Carthage, and Woodbury. Incumbent Republican Michael Hale has represented the district since 2023.

=== Republican primary ===
2024 Tennessee House of Representatives District 40 Republican primary
Party	Candidate	Votes	%
Republican	Michael Hale (incumbent)	4,036	100.00
Total votes		4,036	100.00

=== Democratic primary ===
2024 Tennessee House of Representatives District 40 Democratic primary
Party	Candidate	Votes	%
Democratic	Daniel T. Hawthorne	820	100.00
Total votes		820	100.00

=== General election ===
==== Predictions ====
Source	Ranking
CNalysis	Solid R

==== Results ====
2024 Tennessee House of Representatives District 40 general election
Party	Candidate	Votes	%
Republican	Michael Hale (incumbent)	25,287	83.73
Democratic	Daniel T. Hawthorne	4,913	16.27
Total votes		30,200	100.00
Republican hold			

== District 41 ==
2024 Tennessee House of Representatives 41st district election
Nominee	Ed Butler	Joel Derek Hawn
Party	Republican	Democratic
Popular vote	24,763	5,113
Percentage	82.89%	17.11%
Representative before election
Ed Butler
Republican
Elected Representative
Ed Butler
Republican

The 41st district is located between East and Middle Tennessee and consists of all of Morgan and Overton counties, the southern half of Fentress County, a northern strip of Anderson County, and a very small piece of northern Roane County. The district includes the cities of Livingston, Coalfield, Norris, Petros, and parts of the cities of Oliver Springs and Clinton. Incumbent Republican Ed Butler has represented the district since 2023.

=== Republican primary ===
2024 Tennessee House of Representatives District 41 Republican primary
Party	Candidate	Votes	%
Republican	Ed Butler (incumbent)	5,368	100.00
Total votes		5,368	100.00

=== Democratic primary ===
2024 Tennessee House of Representatives District 41 Democratic primary
Party	Candidate	Votes	%
Democratic	Joel Derek Hawn	1,017	100.00
Total votes		1,017	100.00

=== General election ===
==== Predictions ====
Source	Ranking
CNalysis	Solid R

==== Results ====
2024 Tennessee House of Representatives District 41 general election
Party	Candidate	Votes	%
Republican	Ed Butler (incumbent)	24,763	82.89
Democratic	Joel Derek Hawn	5,113	17.11
Total votes		29,876	100.00
Republican hold			

== District 42 ==
2024 Tennessee House of Representatives 42nd district election
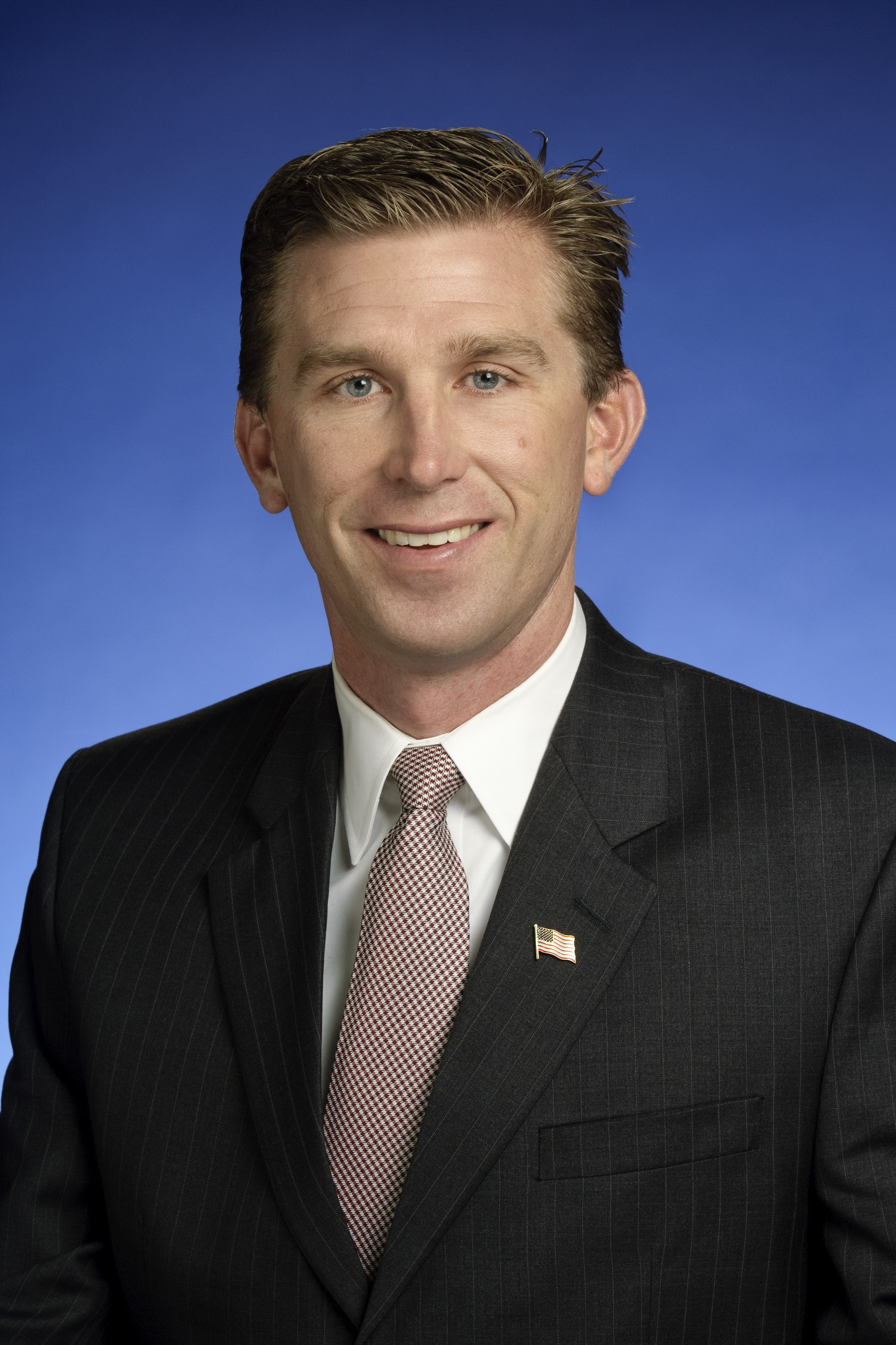

Nominee	Ryan Williams	Amber "Bennie" Taylor
Party	Republican	Democratic
Popular vote	21,184	7,482
Percentage	73.90%	26.10%
Representative before election
Ryan Williams
Republican
Elected Representative
Ryan Williams
Republican

The 42nd district is located in Middle Tennessee and consists of the western half of Putnam County. The district includes the cities of Cookeville, Algood, and Baxter. Incumbent Republican Ryan Williams has represented the district since 2011.

=== Republican primary ===
2024 Tennessee House of Representatives District 42 Republican primary
Party	Candidate	Votes	%
Republican	Ryan D. Williams (incumbent)	2,411	100.00
Total votes		2,411	100.00

=== Democratic primary ===
2024 Tennessee House of Representatives District 42 Democratic primary
Party	Candidate	Votes	%
Democratic	Amber "Bennie" Taylor	1,212	100.00
Total votes		1,212	100.00

=== General election ===
==== Predictions ====
Source	Ranking
CNalysis	Solid R

==== Results ====
2024 Tennessee House of Representatives District 42 general election
Party	Candidate	Votes	%
Republican	Ryan D. Williams (incumbent)	21,184	73.90
Democratic	Amber "Bennie" Taylor	7,482	26.10
Total votes		28,666	100.00
Republican hold			

== District 43 ==
2024 Tennessee House of Representatives 43rd district election
Nominee	Paul Sherrell
Party	Republican
Popular vote	23,446
Percentage	100.00%
Representative before election
Paul Sherrell
Republican
Elected Representative
Paul Sherrell
Republican

The 43rd district is located in Middle Tennessee and consists of all of White and Warren counties. The district includes the cities of McMinnville and Sparta. Incumbent Republican Paul Sherrell has represented the district since 2017.

=== Republican primary ===
2024 Tennessee House of Representatives District 43 Republican primary
Party	Candidate	Votes	%
Republican	Paul Sherrell (incumbent)	3,061	49.59
Republican	Robert McCormick	2,655	43.02
Republican	Tim Lewis	456	7.39
Total votes		6,172	100.00

=== General election ===
2024 Tennessee House of Representatives District 43 general election
Party	Candidate	Votes	%
Republican	Paul Sherrell (incumbent)	23,446	100.00
Total votes		23,446	100.00
Republican hold			

== District 44 ==
2024 Tennessee House of Representatives 44th district election
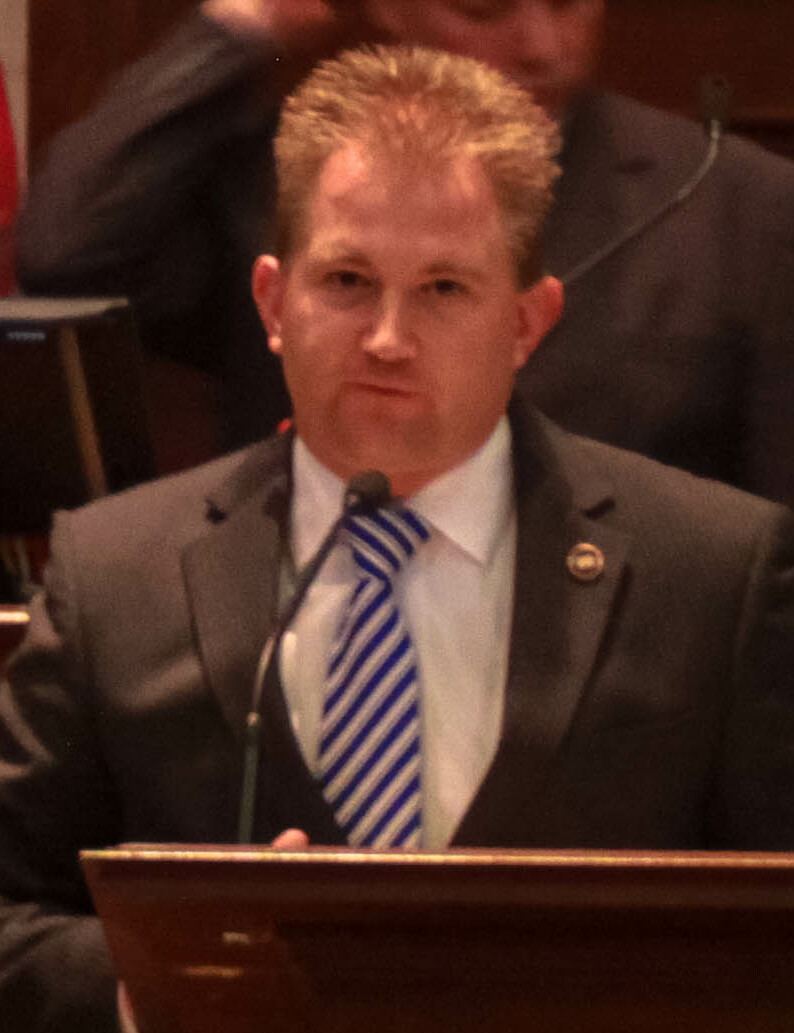

Nominee	William Lamberth	Brian Robertson
Party	Republican	Democratic
Popular vote	27,028	8,039
Percentage	77.08%	22.92%
Representative before election
William Lamberth
Republican
Elected Representative
William Lamberth
Republican

The 44th district is located in Middle Tennessee and consists of most of Sumner County. The district includes the cities of Portland, White House, Westmoreland, and part of the cities of Hendersonville and Gallatin. Incumbent Republican William Lamberth has represented the district since 2013.

=== Republican primary ===
2024 Tennessee House of Representatives District 44 Republican primary
Party	Candidate	Votes	%
Republican	William Lamberth (incumbent)	4,886	100.00
Total votes		4,886	100.00

=== Democratic primary ===
2024 Tennessee House of Representatives District 44 Democratic primary
Party	Candidate	Votes	%
Democratic	Brian Robertson	913	100.00
Total votes		913	100.00

=== General election ===
==== Predictions ====
Source	Ranking
CNalysis	Solid R

==== Results ====
2024 Tennessee House of Representatives District 44 general election
Party	Candidate	Votes	%
Republican	William Lamberth (incumbent)	27,028	77.08
Democratic	Brian Robertson	8,039	22.92
Total votes		35,067	100.00
Republican hold			

== District 45 ==
2024 Tennessee House of Representatives 45th district election
Nominee	Johnny Garrett	Alison Beale
Party	Republican	Democratic
Popular vote	21,845	10,354
Percentage	67.84%	32.16%
Representative before election
Johnny Garrett
Republican
Elected Representative
Johnny Garrett
Republican

The 45th district is located in Middle Tennessee and consists of a southwestern portion of Sumner County. The district includes all of the city of Shackle Island, most of Millersville, the western half of Hendersonville, and the Sumner County portion of Goodlettsville. Incumbent Republican Johnny Garrett has represented the district since 2019.

=== Republican primary ===
2024 Tennessee House of Representatives District 45 Republican primary
Party	Candidate	Votes	%
Republican	Johnny Garrett (incumbent)	4,763	100.00
Total votes		4,763	100.00

=== Democratic primary ===
2024 Tennessee House of Representatives District 45 Democratic primary
Party	Candidate	Votes	%
Democratic	Alison Beale	1,230	100.00
Total votes		1,230	100.00

=== General election ===
==== Predictions ====
Source	Ranking
CNalysis	Solid R

==== Results ====
2024 Tennessee House of Representatives District 45 general election
Party	Candidate	Votes	%
Republican	Johnny Garrett (incumbent)	21,845	67.84
Democratic	Alison Beale	10,354	32.16
Total votes		32,199	100.00
Republican hold			

== District 46 ==
2024 Tennessee House of Representatives 46th district election
Nominee	Clark Boyd	Joni Cochran
Party	Republican	Democratic
Popular vote	28,319	9,508
Percentage	74.86%	25.14%
Representative before election
Clark Boyd
Republican
Elected Representative
Clark Boyd
Republican

The 46th district is located in Middle Tennessee and consists of a large portion of Wilson County. The district includes most of the city of Lebanon, all of Watertown, and a small part of Gladeville. Incumbent Republican Clark Boyd has represented the district since 2018.

=== Republican primary ===
2024 Tennessee House of Representatives District 46 Republican primary
Party	Candidate	Votes	%
Republican	Clark Boyd (incumbent)	4,841	100.00
Total votes		4,841	100.00

=== Democratic primary ===
2024 Tennessee House of Representatives District 46 Democratic primary
Party	Candidate	Votes	%
Democratic	Joni Cochran	1,260	100.00
Total votes		1,260	100.00

=== General election ===
==== Predictions ====
Source	Ranking
CNalysis	Solid R

==== Results ====
2024 Tennessee House of Representatives District 46 general election
Party	Candidate	Votes	%
Republican	Clark Boyd (incumbent)	28,319	74.86
Democratic	Joni Cochran	9,508	25.14
Total votes		37,827	100.00
Republican hold			

== District 47 ==
2024 Tennessee House of Representatives 47th district election
Nominee	Rush Bricken	Veronica Owens
Party	Republican	Independent
Popular vote	23,052	5,822
Percentage	79.84%	20.16%
Representative before election
Rush Bricken
Republican
Elected Representative
Rush Bricken
Republican

The 47th district is located in Middle Tennessee and consists of all of Grundy County and Coffee County. The district includes the cities of Manchester, Gruetli-Laager, New Union, and the Coffee County portion of Tullahoma. Incumbent Republican Rush Bricken has represented the district since 2019.

=== Republican primary ===
2024 Tennessee House of Representatives District 47 Republican primary
Party	Candidate	Votes	%
Republican	Rush Bricken (incumbent)	5,231	100.00
Total votes		5,231	100.00

=== General election ===
==== Predictions ====
Source	Ranking
CNalysis	Solid R

==== Results ====
2024 Tennessee House of Representatives District 47 general election
Party	Candidate	Votes	%
Republican	Rush Bricken (incumbent)	23,052	79.84
Independent	Veronica Owens	5,822	20.16
Total votes		28,874	100.00
Republican hold			

== District 48 ==
2024 Tennessee House of Representatives 48th district election
Nominee	Bryan Terry	Matt Ferry
Party	Republican	Democratic
Popular vote	20,555	10,903
Percentage	65.34%	34.66%
Representative before election
Bryan Terry
Republican
Elected Representative
Bryan Terry
Republican

The 48th district is located in Middle Tennessee and consists of the eastern half of Rutherford County. The district includes a small part of the city of Murfreesboro and about half of Walterhill and Christiana. Incumbent Republican Bryan Terry has represented the district since 2015.

=== Republican primary ===
2024 Tennessee House of Representatives District 48 Republican primary
Party	Candidate	Votes	%
Republican	Bryan Terry (incumbent)	3,157	100.00
Total votes		3,157	100.00

=== Democratic primary ===
2024 Tennessee House of Representatives District 48 Democratic primary
Party	Candidate	Votes	%
Democratic	Matt Ferry	1,528	100.00
Total votes		1,528	100.00

=== General election ===
==== Predictions ====
Source	Ranking
CNalysis	Solid R

==== Results ====
2024 Tennessee House of Representatives District 48 general election
Party	Candidate	Votes	%
Republican	Bryan Terry (incumbent)	20,555	65.34
Democratic	Matt Ferry	10,903	34.66
Total votes		31,458	100.00
Republican hold			

== District 49 ==
2024 Tennessee House of Representatives 49th district election
Nominee	Mike Sparks	Luis Mata
Party	Republican	Democratic
Popular vote	15,361	11,492
Percentage	57.20%	42.80%
- County results Sparks: 50–60%
Representative before election
Mike Sparks
Republican
Elected Representative
Mike Sparks
Republican

The 49th district is located in Middle Tennessee and consists of a northwestern portion of Rutherford County. The district includes most of the city of Smyrna, about half of La Vergne, and a small part of Murfreesboro. Incumbent Republican Mike Sparks has represented the district since 2011.

=== Republican primary ===
2024 Tennessee House of Representatives District 49 Republican primary
Party	Candidate	Votes	%
Republican	Mike Sparks (incumbent)	1,595	100.00
Total votes		1,595	100.00

=== Democratic primary ===
2024 Tennessee House of Representatives District 49 Democratic primary
Party	Candidate	Votes	%
Democratic	Luis Mata	1,153	100.00
Total votes		1,153	100.00

=== General election ===
==== Predictions ====
Source	Ranking
CNalysis	Likely R

==== Results ====
2024 Tennessee House of Representatives District 49 general election
Party	Candidate	Votes	%
Republican	Mike Sparks (incumbent)	15,361	57.20
Democratic	Luis Mata	11,492	42.80
Total votes		26,853	100.00
Republican hold			

== District 50 ==
2024 Tennessee House of Representatives 50th district election
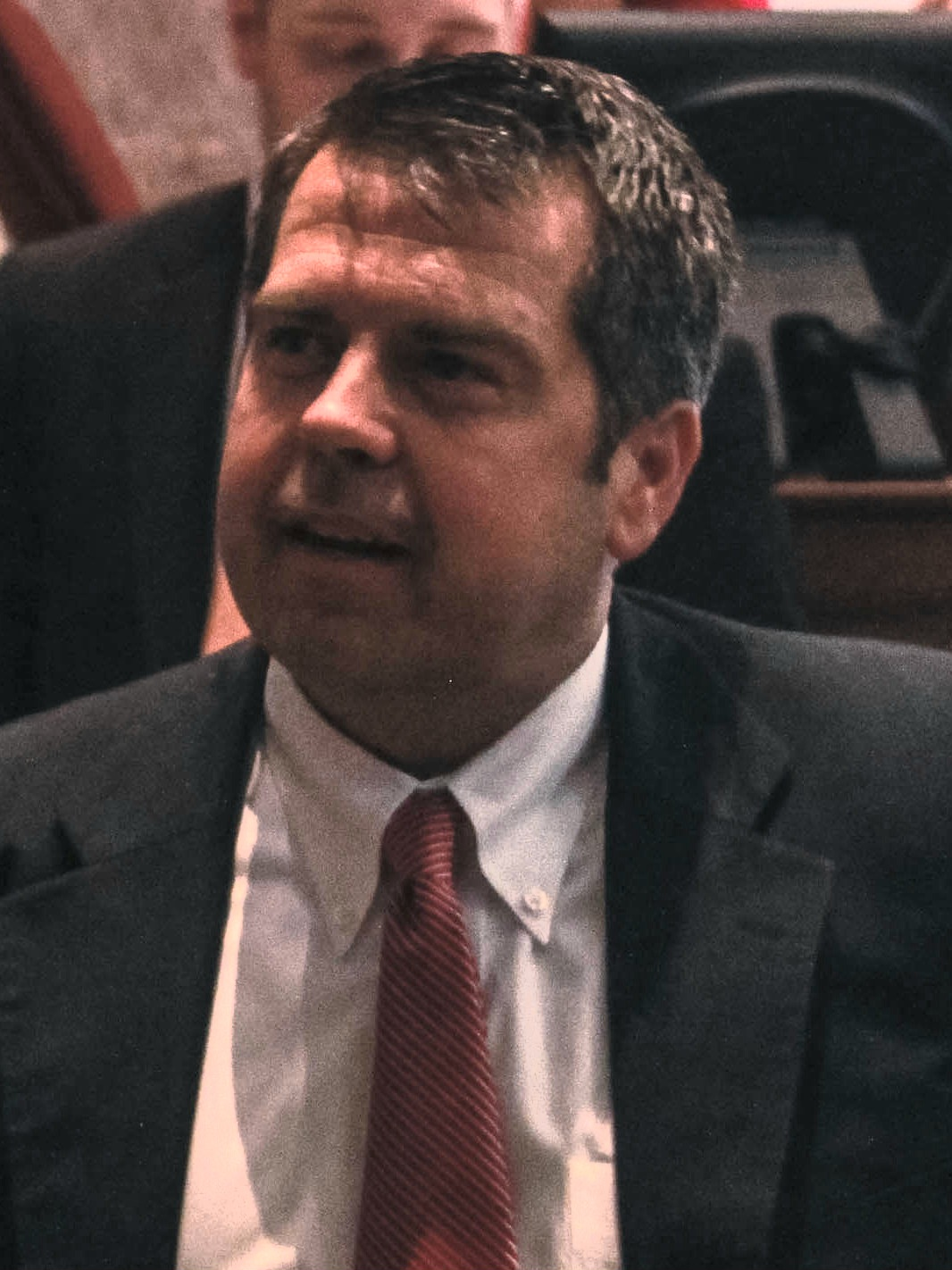

Nominee	Bo Mitchell	Jennifer Frensley Webb
Party	Democratic	Republican
Popular vote	16,632	14,117
Percentage	54.09%	45.91%
Representative before election
Bo Mitchell
Democratic
Elected Representative
Bo Mitchell
Democratic

The 50th district is located in Middle Tennessee and consists of a northwestern portion of Davidson County, and is the largest district in the county. The district includes a northwestern portion of the city of Nashville, most of the Davidson County portion of Goodlettsville, and all of the Davidson County portion of Ridgetop. Incumbent Democrat Bo Mitchell has represented the district since 2013. The district is relatively competitive.

Mitchell won re-election by 8.2%. On the concurrent presidential election, Kamala Harris won the district with a margin of 4.4%.

=== Democratic primary ===
2024 Tennessee House of Representatives District 50 Democratic primary
Party	Candidate	Votes	%
Democratic	Bo Mitchell (incumbent)	3,931	100.00
Total votes		3,931	100.00

=== Republican primary ===
2024 Tennessee House of Representatives District 50 Republican primary
Party	Candidate	Votes	%
Republican	Jennifer Frensley Webb	2,237	100.00
Total votes		2,237	100.00

=== General election ===
==== Predictions ====
Source	Ranking
CNalysis	Very Likely D

==== Results ====
2024 Tennessee House of Representatives District 50 general election
Party	Candidate	Votes	%
Democratic	Bo Mitchell (incumbent)	16,632	54.09
Republican	Jennifer Frensley Webb	14,117	45.91
Total votes		30,749	100.00
Democratic hold			

== District 51 ==
2024 Tennessee House of Representatives 51st district election
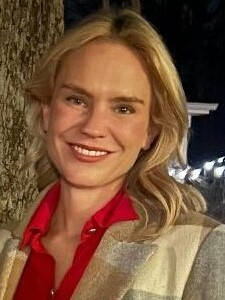

Nominee	Aftyn Behn	Jeff Ketelsen
Party	Democratic	Independent
Popular vote	24,391	8,626
Percentage	73.87%	26.13%
Representative before election
Aftyn Behn
Democratic
Elected Representative
Aftyn Behn
Democratic

The 51st district is located in Middle Tennessee and consists of a section of Nashville in central Davidson County. The district includes parts of Downtown Nashville, East Nashville, and South Nashville. Incumbent Democrat Aftyn Behn has represented the district since 2023.

=== Democratic primary ===
2024 Tennessee House of Representatives District 51 Democratic primary
Party	Candidate	Votes	%
Democratic	Aftyn Behn (incumbent)	6,145	100.00
Total votes		6,145	100.00

=== General election ===
==== Predictions ====
Source	Ranking
CNalysis	Solid D

==== Results ====
2024 Tennessee House of Representatives District 51 general election
Party	Candidate	Votes	%
Democratic	Aftyn Behn (incumbent)	24,391	73.87
Independent	Jeff Ketelsen	8,626	26.13
Total votes		33,017	100.00
Democratic hold			

== District 52 ==
2024 Tennessee House of Representatives 52nd district election
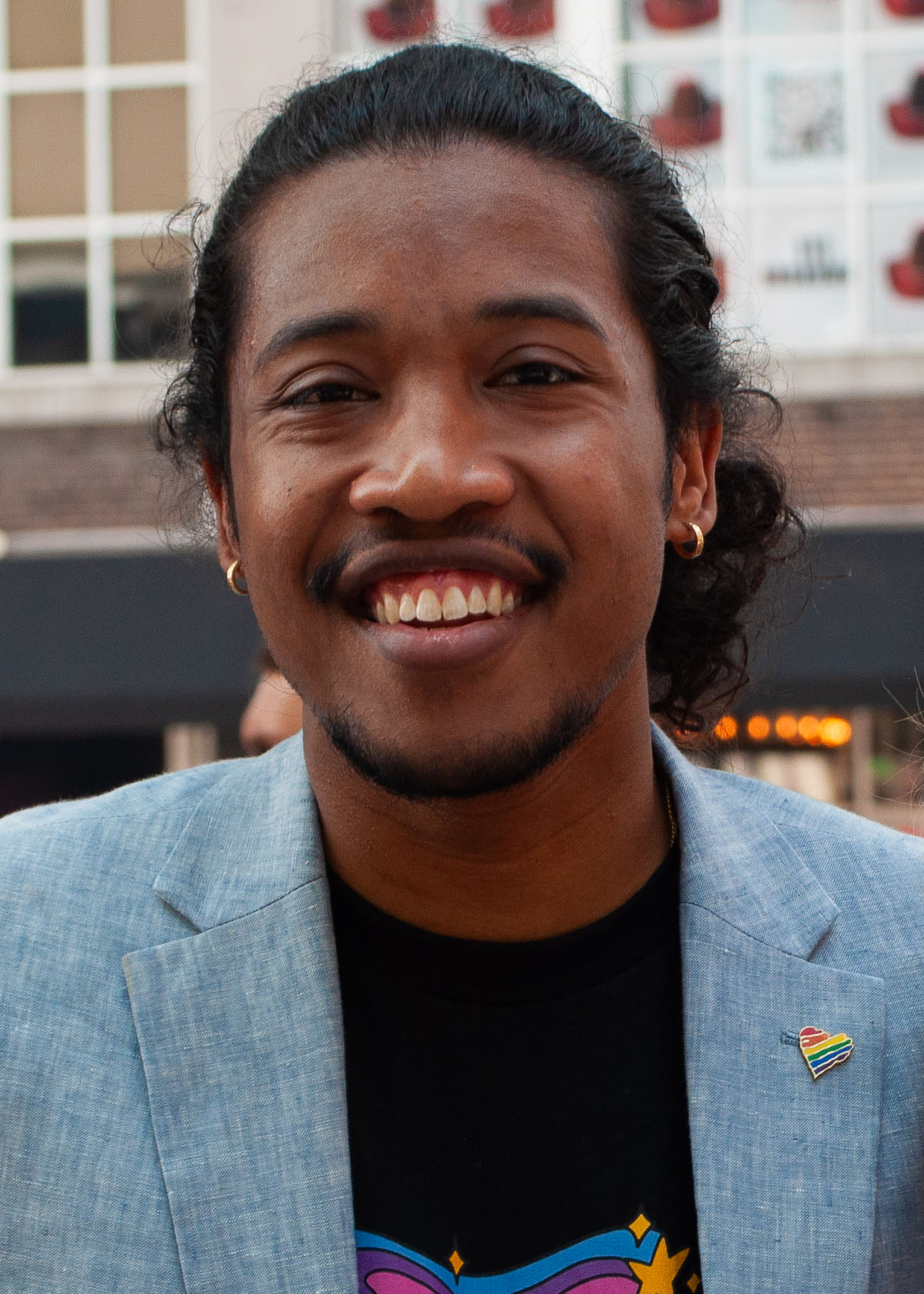

Nominee	Justin Jones	Laura Nelson
Party	Democratic	Republican
Popular vote	13,479	5,995
Percentage	69.22%	30.78%
Representative before election
Justin Jones
Democratic
Elected Representative
Justin Jones
Democratic

The 52nd district is located in Middle Tennessee and consists of a section of Nashville in eastern Davidson County. The district includes Antioch and parts of East Nashville. Incumbent Democrat Justin Jones first represented the district beginning in 2023. This was Jones' first regular election following his expulsion from the Tennessee House of Representatives in 2023. After his expulsion, Jones was reinstated by the Nashville Metro Council and re-elected in a special election held later that year.

=== Democratic primary ===
2024 Tennessee House of Representatives District 52 Democratic primary
Party	Candidate	Votes	%
Democratic	Justin Jones (incumbent)	3,127	100.00
Total votes		3,127	100.00

=== Republican primary ===
2024 Tennessee House of Representatives District 52 Republican primary
Party	Candidate	Votes	%
Republican	Laura Nelson	861	100.00
Total votes		861	100.00

=== General election ===
==== Predictions ====
Source	Ranking
CNalysis	Solid D

==== Results ====
2024 Tennessee House of Representatives District 52 general election
Party	Candidate	Votes	%
Democratic	Justin Jones (incumbent)	13,479	69.22
Republican	Laura Nelson	5,995	30.78
Total votes		19,474	100.00
Democratic hold			

== District 53 ==
2024 Tennessee House of Representatives 53rd district election
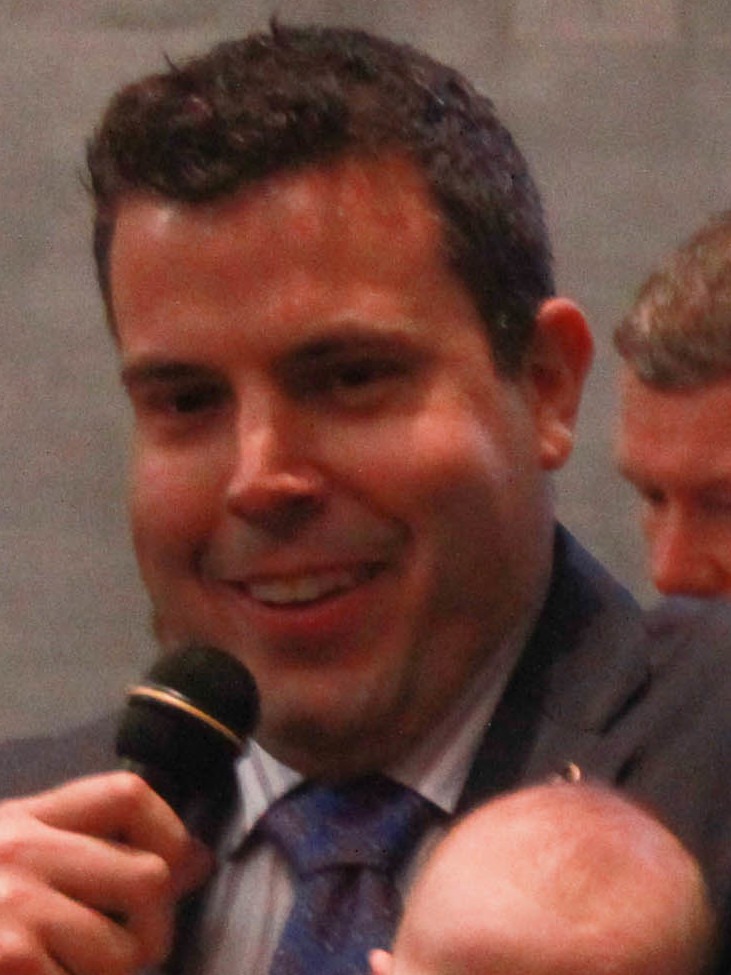

Nominee	Jason Powell	Yog Nepal
Party	Democratic	Republican
Popular vote	14,004	7,494
Percentage	62.46%	33.43%
Representative before election
Jason Powell
Democratic
Elected Representative
Jason Powell
Democratic

The 53rd district is located in Middle Tennessee and consists of a section of Nashville in southeastern Davidson County. Incumbent Democrat Jason Powell has represented the district since 2013.

=== Democratic primary ===
2024 Tennessee House of Representatives District 53 Democratic primary
Party	Candidate	Votes	%
Democratic	Jason L. Powell (incumbent)	2,847	100.00
Total votes		2,847	100.00

=== Republican primary ===
2024 Tennessee House of Representatives District 53 Republican primary
Party	Candidate	Votes	%
Republican	Yog Nepal	1,161	100.00
Total votes		1,161	100.00

=== General election ===
==== Predictions ====
Source	Ranking
CNalysis	Solid D

==== Results ====
2024 Tennessee House of Representatives District 53 general election
Party	Candidate	Votes	%
Democratic	Jason L. Powell (incumbent)	14,004	62.46
Republican	Yog Nepal	7,494	33.43
Independent	Rueben I. Dockery	921	4.11
Total votes		22,419	100.00
Democratic hold			

== District 54 ==
2024 Tennessee House of Representatives 54th district election
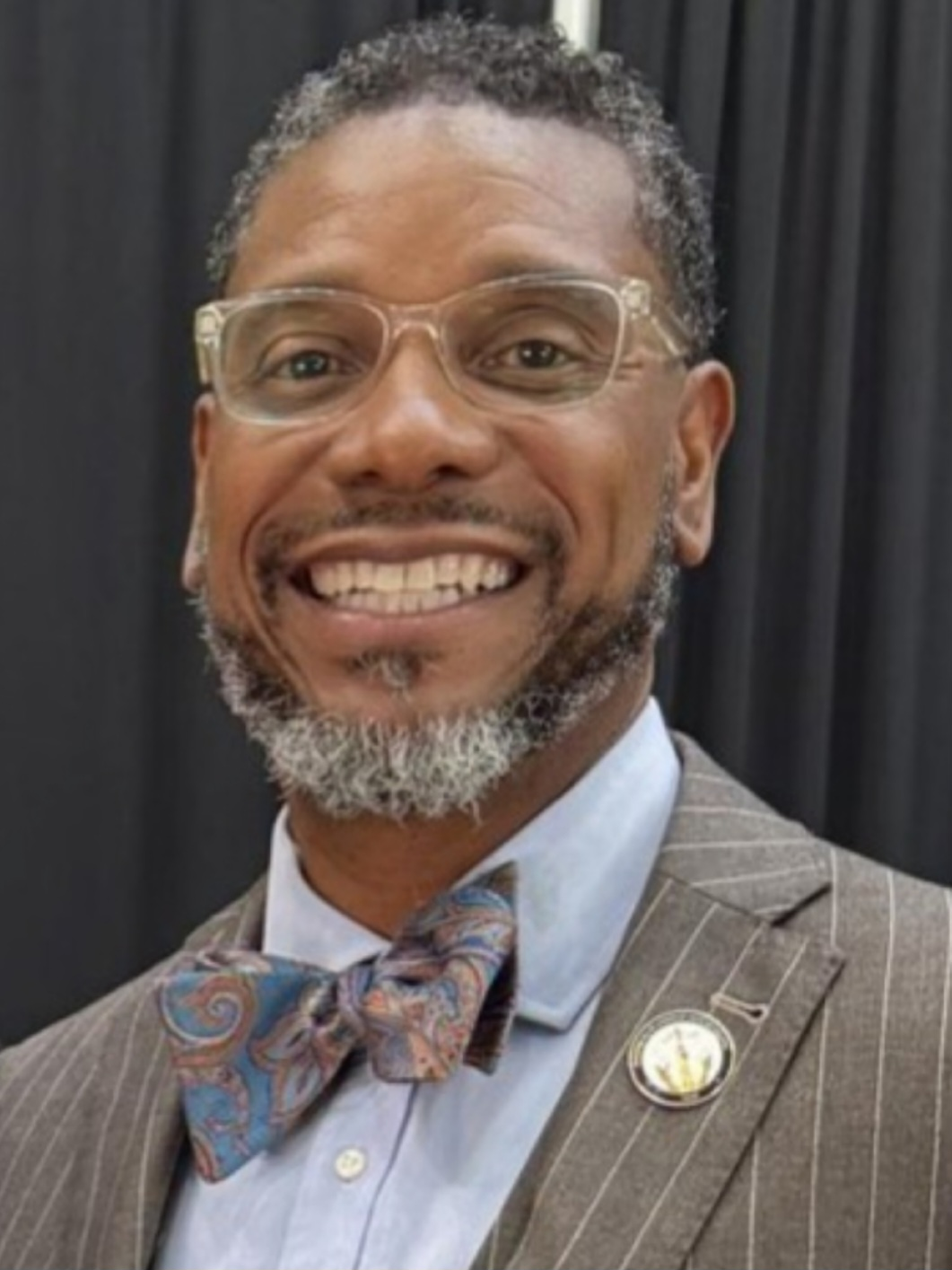
Nominee	Vincent Dixie
Party	Democratic
Popular vote	22,893
Percentage	100.00%
Representative before election
Vincent B. Dixie
Democratic
Elected Representative
Vincent B. Dixie
Democratic

The 54th district is located in Middle Tennessee and consists of a section of Nashville in northwestern Davidson County. Incumbent Democrat Vincent B. Dixie has represented the district since 2019.

=== Republican primary ===
No candidates qualified for the Republican primary. 38 write-in votes were cast.

=== Democratic primary ===
2024 Tennessee House of Representatives District 54 Democratic Primary
Party	Candidate	Votes	%
Democratic	Vincent B. Dixie (incumbent)	5,892	99.76
Write-in		14	0.24
Total votes		5,906	100.00

=== General election ===
2024 Tennessee House of Representatives District 54 general election
Party	Candidate	Votes	%
Democratic	Vincent B. Dixie (incumbent)	22,893	100.00
Total votes		22,893	100.00
Democratic hold			

== District 55 ==
2024 Tennessee House of Representatives 55th district election
Nominee	John Ray Clemmons
Party	Democratic
Popular vote	13,388
Percentage	100.00%
Representative before election
John Ray Clemmons
Democratic
Elected Representative
John Ray Clemmons
Democratic

The 55th district is located in Middle Tennessee and consists of a section of Nashville in southeastern Davidson County. Incumbent Democrat John Ray Clemmons has represented the district since 2015.

=== Republican primary ===
No candidates qualified for the Republican primary. 44 write-in votes were cast.

=== Democratic primary ===
2024 Tennessee House of Representatives District 55 Democratic Primary
Party	Candidate	Votes	%
Democratic	John Ray Clemmons (incumbent)	2,431	99.71
Write-in		7	0.29
Total votes		2,438	100.00

=== General election ===
2024 Tennessee House of Representatives District 55 Election
Party	Candidate	Votes	%
Democratic	John Ray Clemmons (incumbent)	13,388	100.00
Total votes		13,388	100.00
Democratic hold			

== District 56 ==
2024 Tennessee House of Representatives 56th district election
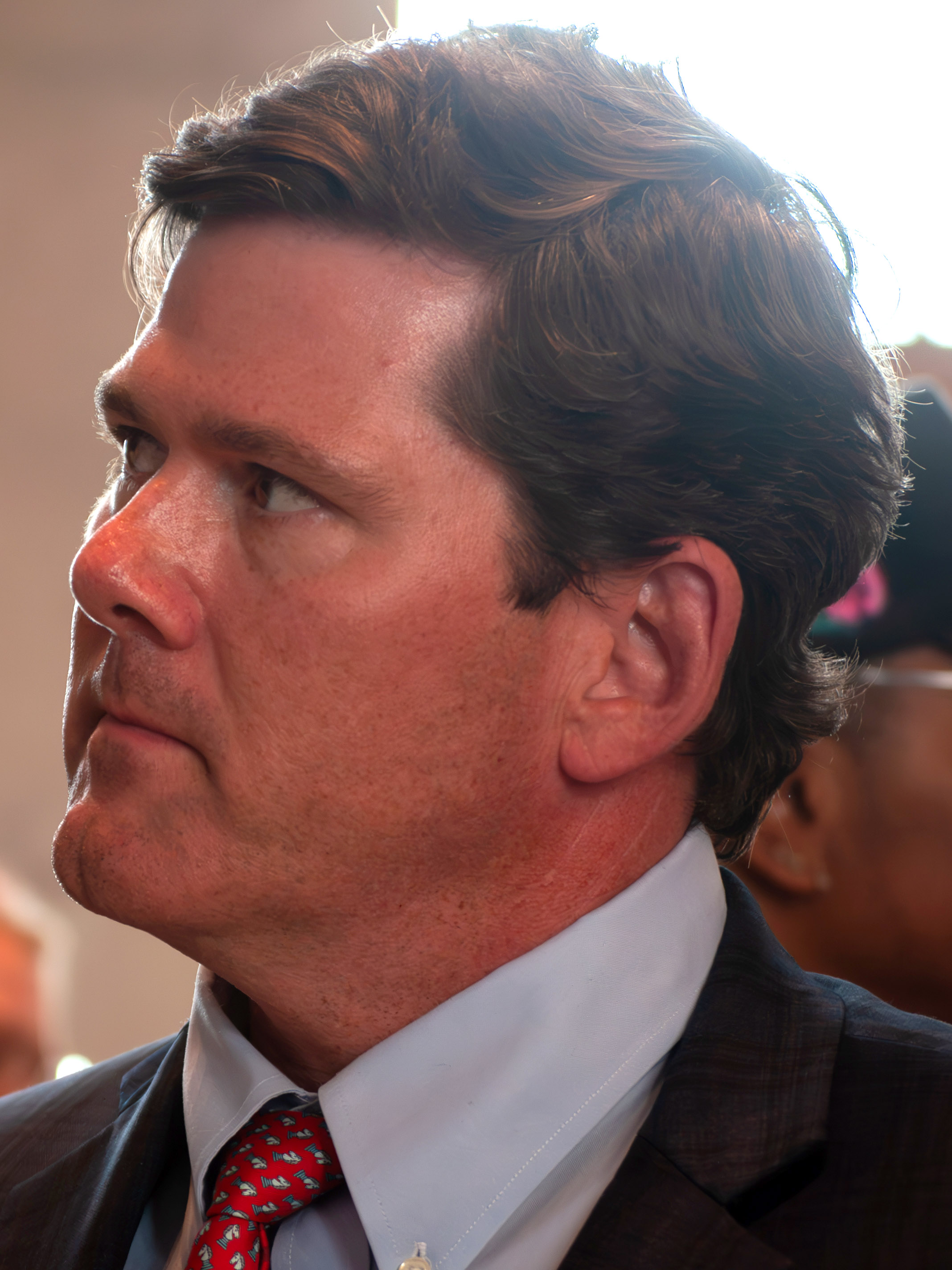
Nominee	Bob Freeman
Party	Democratic
Popular vote	25,690
Percentage	100.00%
Representative before election
Bob Freeman
Democratic
Elected Representative
Bob Freeman
Democratic

The 56th district is located in Middle Tennessee and consists of a section of Nashville in southwestern Davidson County. Incumbent Democrat Bob Freeman has represented the district since 2019.

=== Republican primary ===
No candidates qualified for the Republican primary. 167 write-in votes were cast.

=== Democratic primary ===
2024 Tennessee House of Representatives District 56 Democratic Primary
Party	Candidate	Votes	%
Democratic	Bob Freeman (incumbent)	4,803	84.13
Democratic	Nick Forster-Benson	902	15.80
Write-in		4	0.07
Total votes		5,709	100.00

=== General election ===
2024 Tennessee House of Representatives District 56 general election
Party	Candidate	Votes	%
Democratic	Bob Freeman (incumbent)	25,690	100.00
Total votes		25,690	100.00
Democratic hold			

== District 57 ==
2024 Tennessee House of Representatives 57th district election
Nominee	Susan Lynn	Ailina Carona
Party	Republican	Democratic
Popular vote	27,040	12,895
Percentage	67.71%	32.29%
Representative before election
Susan Lynn
Republican
Elected Representative
Susan Lynn
Republican

The 57th district is located in Middle Tennessee and consists of a western portion of Wilson County, including Mount Juliet. Incumbent Republican Susan Lynn has represented the district since 2013.

=== Republican primary ===
2024 Tennessee House of Representatives District 57 Republican Primary
Party	Candidate	Votes	%
Republican	Susan Lynn (incumbent)	5,769	97.45
Write-in		151	2.55
Total votes		5,920	100.00

=== Democratic primary ===
2024 Tennessee House of Representatives District 57 Democratic Primary
Party	Candidate	Votes	%
Democratic	Ailina Carona	2,228	99.69
Write-in		7	0.31
Total votes		2,235	100.00

=== General election ===
==== Predictions ====
Source	Ranking
CNalysis	Solid R

==== Results ====
2024 Tennessee House of Representatives District 57 Election
Party	Candidate	Votes	%
Republican	Susan Lynn (incumbent)	27,040	67.71
Democratic	Ailina Carona	12,895	32.29
Total votes		39,935	100.00
Republican hold			

== District 58 ==
2024 Tennessee House of Representatives 58th district election
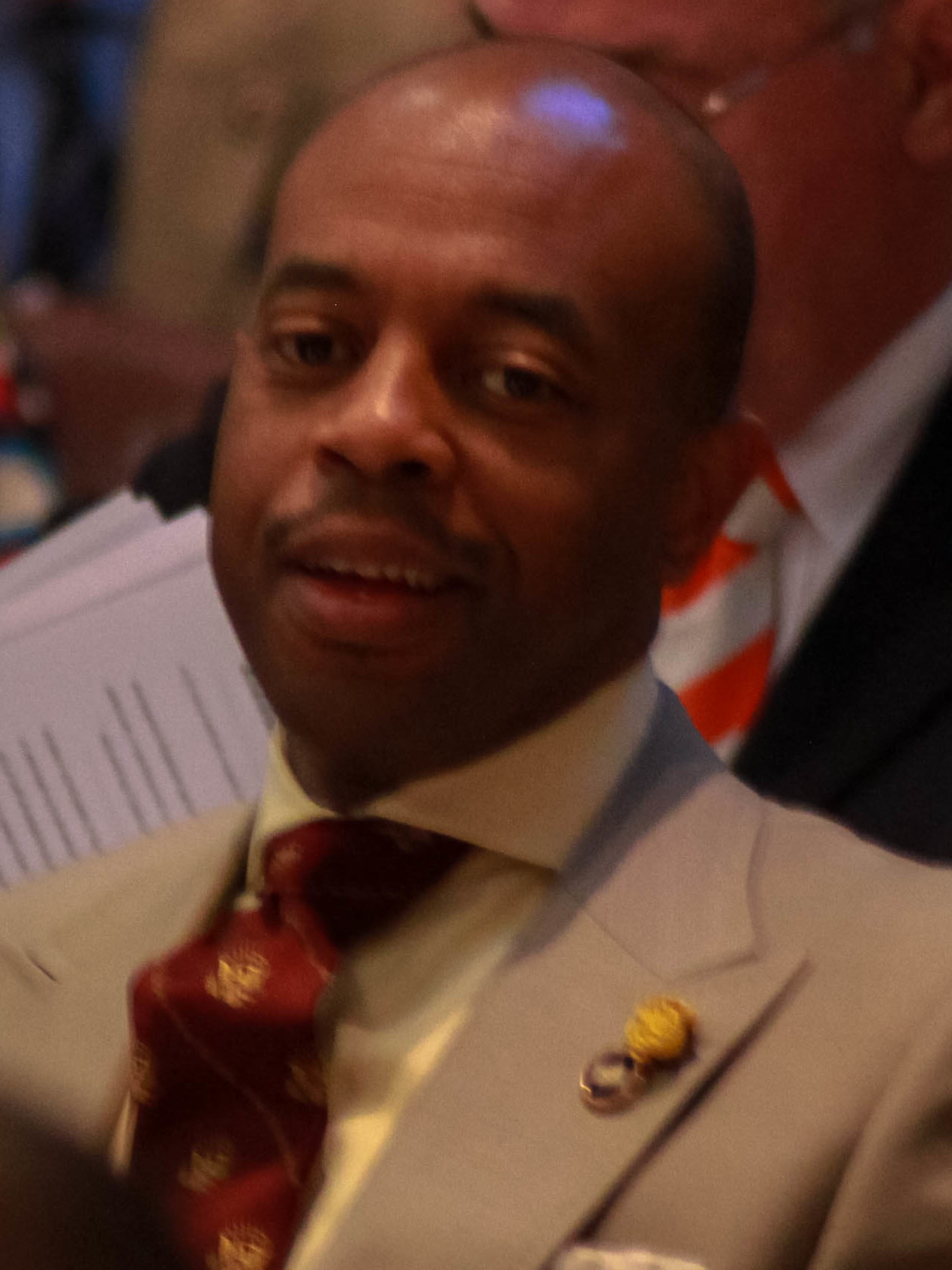
Nominee	Harold M. Love Jr.
Party	Democratic
Popular vote	19,027
Percentage	100.00%
Representative before election
Harold M. Love Jr.
Democratic
Elected Representative
Harold M. Love Jr.
Democratic

The 58th district is located in Middle Tennessee and consists of a section of Nashville in central Davidson County. Incumbent Democrat Harold M. Love Jr. has represented the district since 2013.

=== Republican primary ===
No candidates qualified for the Republican primary. 32 write-in votes were cast.

=== Democratic primary ===
2024 Tennessee House of Representatives District 58 Democratic Primary
Party	Candidate	Votes	%
Democratic	Harold M. Love Jr. (incumbent)	3,850	99.74
Write-in		10	0.26
Total votes		3,860	100.00

=== General election ===
2024 Tennessee House of Representatives District 58 Election
Party	Candidate	Votes	%
Democratic	Harold M. Love Jr. (incumbent)	19,027	100.00
Total votes		19,027	100.00
Democratic hold			

== District 59 ==
2024 Tennessee House of Representatives 59th district election
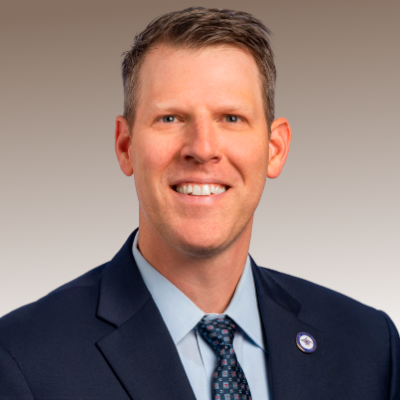
Nominee	Caleb Hemmer
Party	Democratic
Popular vote	25,812
Percentage	100.00%
Representative before election
Caleb Hemmer
Democratic
Elected Representative
Caleb Hemmer
Democratic

The 59th district is located in Middle Tennessee and covers parts of southern Davidson County, including neighborhoods such as Belle Meade, Forest Hills, Oak Hill, and Bellevue, in Nashville. Incumbent Democrat Caleb Hemmer has represented the district since 2023. He was re-elected unopposed in 2024. Though the district has shown signs of competitiveness—Republican Governor Bill Lee narrowly carried it in the 2022 gubernatorial election—Republicans did not field a candidate for the State House seat in 2024. On the concurrent presidential election, Kamala Harris won the district with a margin of 2.5%.

=== Republican primary ===
No candidates qualified for the Republican primary. 336 write-in votes were cast.

=== Democratic primary ===
2024 Tennessee House of Representatives District 59 Democratic Primary
Party	Candidate	Votes	%
Democratic	Caleb Hemmer (inc.)	5,022	99.90%
Write-in		5	0.10%
Total votes		5,027	100.00%

=== General election ===
2024 Tennessee House of Representatives District 59 Election
Party	Candidate	Votes	%
Democratic	Caleb Hemmer (inc.)	25,812	100.00%

== District 60 ==
2024 Tennessee House of Representatives 60th district election
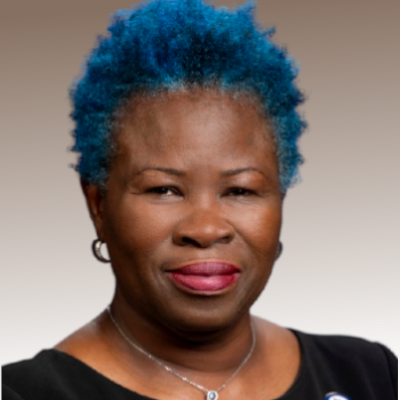

Nominee	Shaundelle Brooks	Chad Bobo
Party	Democratic	Republican
Popular vote	16,681	14,335
Percentage	53.78%	46.22%
Representative before election
Darren Jernigan
Democratic
Elected Representative
Shaundelle Brooks
Democratic

The 60th district is located in eastern Davidson County and includes the suburbs of Donelson, Hermitage, Lakewood, and Old Hickory. Incumbent Democrat Darren Jernigan had represented the district since 2012 before retiring in 2024. Democrat Shaundelle Brooks won the open seat in 2024 by a few points, continuing the party’s streak in a district that leans Democratic but remains somewhat competitive. On the concurrent presidential election, Kamala Harris won the district with a margin of 10.5%.

=== Republican primary ===
2024 Tennessee House of Representatives District 60 Republican Primary
Party	Candidate	Votes	%
Republican	Chad Bobo	1,951	68.67%
Republican	Christopher Huff	881	31.01%
Write-in		9	0.32%
Total votes		2,841	100.00%

=== Democratic primary ===
2024 Tennessee House of Representatives District 60 Democratic Primary
Party	Candidate	Votes	%
Democratic	Shaundelle Brooks	2,579	52.50%
Democratic	Tyler Brasher	2,214	45.07%
Democratic	John W. Parrish	116	2.36%
Write-in		3	0.06%
Total votes		4,912	100.00%

=== General election ===
==== Results ====
2024 Tennessee House of Representatives District 60 Election
Party	Candidate	Votes	%
Democratic	Shaundelle Brooks	16,681	53.78%
Republican	Chad Bobo	14,335	46.22%

== District 61 ==
2024 Tennessee House of Representatives 61st district election
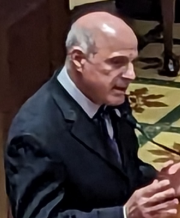

Nominee	Gino Bulso	Claire Jones
Party	Republican	Democratic
Popular vote	25,594	14,711
Percentage	62.07%	35.68%
Representative before election
Gino Bulso
Republican
Elected Representative
Gino Bulso
Republican

The 61st district is located in Middle Tennessee and includes the northern part of Williamson County, particularly part of Brentwood and Franklin. Incumbent Republican Gino Bulso has represented the district since 2023.

=== Republican primary ===
2024 Tennessee House of Representatives District 61 Republican Primary
Party	Candidate	Votes	%
Republican	Gino Bulso (inc.)	5,922	95.29%
Write-in		293	4.71%
Total votes		6,215	100.00%

=== Democratic primary ===
2024 Tennessee House of Representatives District 61 Democratic Primary
Party	Candidate	Votes	%
Democratic	Claire Jones	2,415	71.96%
Democratic	Kurt Kosack	939	27.98%
Write-in		2	0.06%
Total votes		3,943	100.00%

=== General election ===
==== Predictions ====
Source	Ranking
CNalysis	Solid R

==== Results ====
2024 Tennessee House of Representatives District 61 Election
Party	Candidate	Votes	%
Republican	Gino Bulso (inc.)	25,594	62.07%
Democratic	Claire Jones	14,711	35.68%
Independent	Alana LeBlanc	929	2.25%

== District 62 ==
2024 Tennessee House of Representatives 62nd district election
Nominee	Pat Marsh
Party	Republican
Popular vote	26,110
Percentage	100.00%
Representative before election
Pat Marsh
Republican
Elected Representative
Pat Marsh
Republican

The 62nd district is located in Middle Tennessee and includes Bedford, Moore, and parts of Lincoln counties. Incumbent Republican Pat Marsh has represented the district since 2009.

=== Republican primary ===
Note: As of August 5, 2024 only Lincoln County has released write-in totals for the District 62 primaries

2024 Tennessee House of Representatives District 62 Republican Primary
Party	Candidate	Votes	%
Republican	Pat Marsh (inc.)	4,554	99.67%
Write-in		15	0.33%
Total votes		4,569	100.00%

=== Democratic primary ===
No candidates qualified for the Democratic primary. 31 write-in votes were cast.

=== General election ===
2024 Tennessee House of Representatives District 62 Election
Party	Candidate	Votes	%
Republican	Pat Marsh (inc.)	26,110	100.00%

== District 63 ==
2024 Tennessee House of Representatives 63rd district election
Nominee	Jake McCalmon	Laura Andreson
Party	Republican	Democratic
Popular vote	28,667	13,433
Percentage	68.09%	31.91%
Representative before election
Jake McCalmon
Republican
Elected Representative
Jake McCalmon
Republican

The 63rd district is located in Middle Tennessee, covering the eastern part of Williamson County, including Nolensville and parts of Brentwood and Franklin. Incumbent Republican Jake McCalmon has represented the district since 2022.

=== Republican primary ===
2024 Tennessee House of Representatives District 63 Republican Primary
Party	Candidate	Votes	%
Republican	Jake McCalmon (inc.)	5,634	98.56%
Write-in		82	1.44%
Total votes		5,716	100.00%

=== Democratic primary ===
2024 Tennessee House of Representatives District 63 Democratic Primary
Party	Candidate	Votes	%
Democratic	Laura Andreson	2,130	99.58%
Write-in		9	0.42%
Total votes		2,139	100.00%

=== General election ===
==== Predictions ====
Source	Ranking
CNalysis	Solid R

==== Results ====
2024 Tennessee House of Representatives District 63 Election
Party	Candidate	Votes	%
Republican	Jake McCalmon (inc.)	28,667	68.09%
Democratic	Laura Andreson	13,433	31.91%

== District 64 ==
2024 Tennessee House of Representatives 64th district election
Nominee	Scott Cepicky	Eileen H. Longstreet
Party	Republican	Democratic
Popular vote	24,898	10,590
Percentage	70.16%	29.84%
Representative before election
Scott Cepicky
Republican
Elected Representative
Scott Cepicky
Republican

The 64th district is located in Middle Tennessee and includes the eastern half of Maury County, including most of the city of Columbia. Incumbent Republican Scott Cepicky has represented the district since 2019.

=== Republican primary ===
2024 Tennessee House of Representatives District 64 Republican Primary
Party	Candidate	Votes	%
Republican	Scott Cepicky (inc.)	3,950	54.53%
Republican	Ray Jeter	3,294	45.47%
Total votes		7,244	100.00%

=== Democratic primary ===
2024 Tennessee House of Representatives District 64 Democratic Primary
Party	Candidate	Votes	%
Democratic	Eileen H. Longstreet	832	59.01%
Democratic	Alex Pierce	578	40.99%
Total votes		1,410	100.00%

=== General election ===
==== Predictions ====
Source	Ranking
CNalysis	Solid R

==== Results ====
2024 Tennessee House of Representatives District 64 Election
Party	Candidate	Votes	%
Republican	Scott Cepicky (inc.)	24,898	70.16%
Democratic	Eileen H. Longstreet	10,590	29.84%

== District 65 ==
2024 Tennessee House of Representatives 65th district election
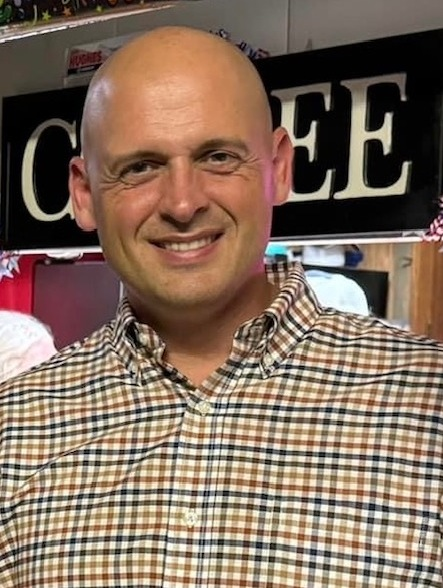

Nominee	Lee Reeves	Larhonda Williams
Party	Republican	Democratic
Popular vote	28,234	12,503
Percentage	69.31%	30.69%
- County results Reeves: 60–70%
Representative before election
Sam Whitson
Republican
Elected Representative
Lee Reeves
Republican

The 65th district is located in Middle Tennessee and includes the western part of Williamson County, including Fairview and parts of Franklin and Thompson's Station. Incumbent Republican Sam Whitson who had represented the district since 2017 retired and Republican Lee Reeves succeeded him.

=== Republican primary ===
2024 Tennessee House of Representatives District 65 Republican Primary
Party	Candidate	Votes	%
Republican	Lee Reeves	3,141	37.55%
Republican	Brian Beathard	3,046	36.41%
Republican	Michelle Foreman	2,178	26.04%
Total votes		8,365	100.00%

=== Democratic primary ===
2024 Tennessee House of Representatives District 65 Democratic Primary
Party	Candidate	Votes	%
Democratic	Larhonda Williams	2,246	100.00%
Total votes		2,246	100.00%

=== General election ===
==== Predictions ====
Source	Ranking
CNalysis	Solid R

==== Results ====
2024 Tennessee House of Representatives District 65 Election
Party	Candidate	Votes	%
Republican	Lee Reeves	28,234	69.31%
Democratic	Larhonda Williams	12,503	30.69%

== District 66 ==
2024 Tennessee House of Representatives 66th district election
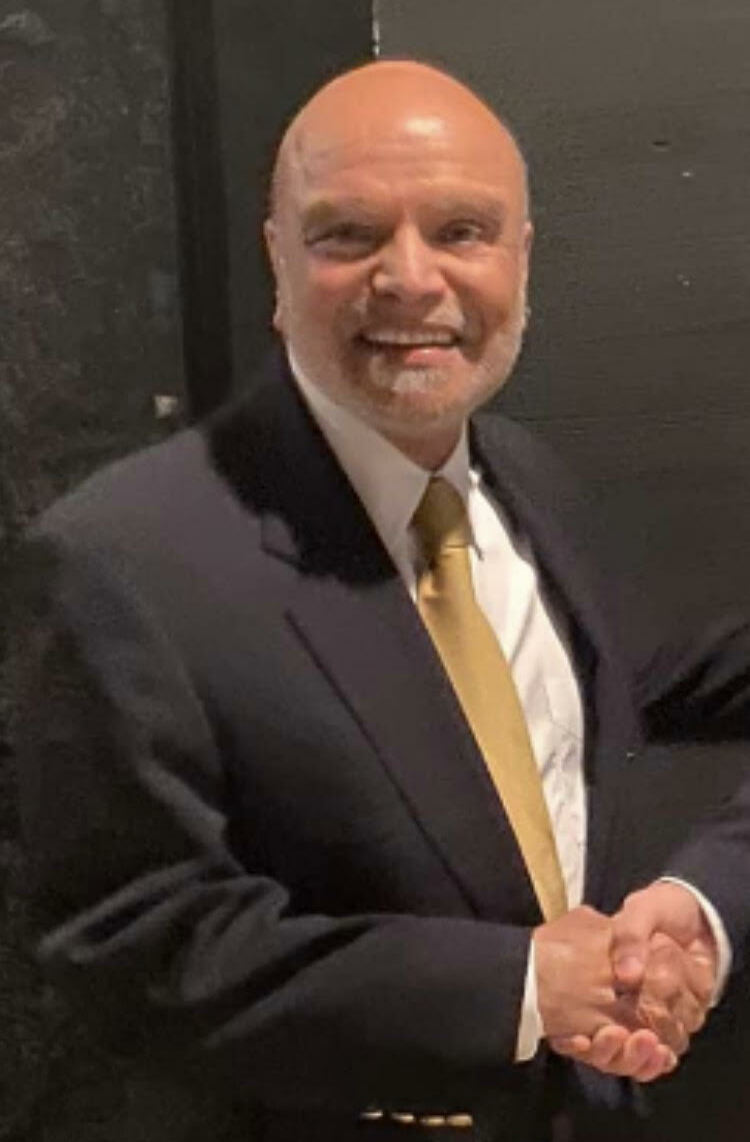

Nominee	Sabi "Doc" Kumar	Elizabeth Webb	Kevin Mead
Party	Republican	Democratic	Independent
Popular vote	23,760	6,152	2,626
Percentage	73.02%	18.91%	8.07%
- County results Kumar: 70–80%
Representative before election
William Lamberth
Republican
Elected Representative
William Lamberth
Republican

The 66th district is located in Middle Tennessee, covering all of Robertson County which includes Springfield. Incumbent Republican Sabi "Doc" Kumar has represented the district since 2015. He is the first Indian American to be elected to the Tennessee State House, and chairs the House Insurance Committee and serves on several others. Kumar was re-elected in 2024.

=== Republican primary ===
2024 Tennessee House of Representatives District 66 Republican Primary
Party	Candidate	Votes	%
Republican	Sabi "Doc" Kumar (inc.)	2,250	100.00%
Total votes		2,250	100.00%

=== Democratic primary ===
2024 Tennessee House of Representatives District 66 Democratic Primary
Party	Candidate	Votes	%
Democratic	Elizabeth Webb	736	100.00%
Total votes		736	100.00%

=== General election ===
==== Predictions ====
Source	Ranking
CNalysis	Solid R

==== Results ====
2024 Tennessee House of Representatives District 66 Election
Party	Candidate	Votes	%
Republican	Sabi "Doc" Kumar (inc.)	23,760	73.02%
Democratic	Elizabeth Webb	6,152	18.91%
Independent	Kevin Mead	2,626	8.07%

== District 67 ==
2024 Tennessee House of Representatives 67th district election
Nominee	Ronnie Glynn	Jamie Dean Peltz
Party	Democratic	Republican
Popular vote	11,055	10,924
Percentage	50.30%	49.70%
- County results Glynn: 50–60%
Representative before election
Ronnie Glynn
Democratic
Elected Representative
Ronnie Glynn
Democratic

The 67th district is located in Middle Tennessee and is located in the urban core of Clarksville in Montgomery County. The district includes the Austin Peay State University campus. Incumbent Democrat Ronnie Glynn had represented the district since 2023. He narrowly won re-election to a second term, winning by just a 0.6% margin. On the concurrent presidential election, Donald Trump won the district with a margin of 1.8%.

=== Republican primary ===
2024 Tennessee House of Representatives District 67 Republican Primary
Party	Candidate	Votes	%
Republican	Jamie Dean Peltz	1,294	100.00%
Total votes		1,294	100.00%

=== Democratic primary ===
2024 Tennessee House of Representatives District 67 Democratic Primary
Party	Candidate	Votes	%
Democratic	Ronnie Glynn (inc.)	1,381	100.00%
Total votes		1,381	100.00%

=== General election ===
==== Predictions ====
Source	Ranking
CNalysis	Likely D

==== Results ====
2024 Tennessee House of Representatives District 67 Election
Party	Candidate	Votes	%
Democratic	Ronnie Glynn (incumbent)	11,055	50.30%
Republican	Jamie Dean Peltz	10,924	49.70%
Total votes		21,979	100.00%
Democratic hold			

== District 68 ==
2024 Tennessee House of Representatives 68th district election
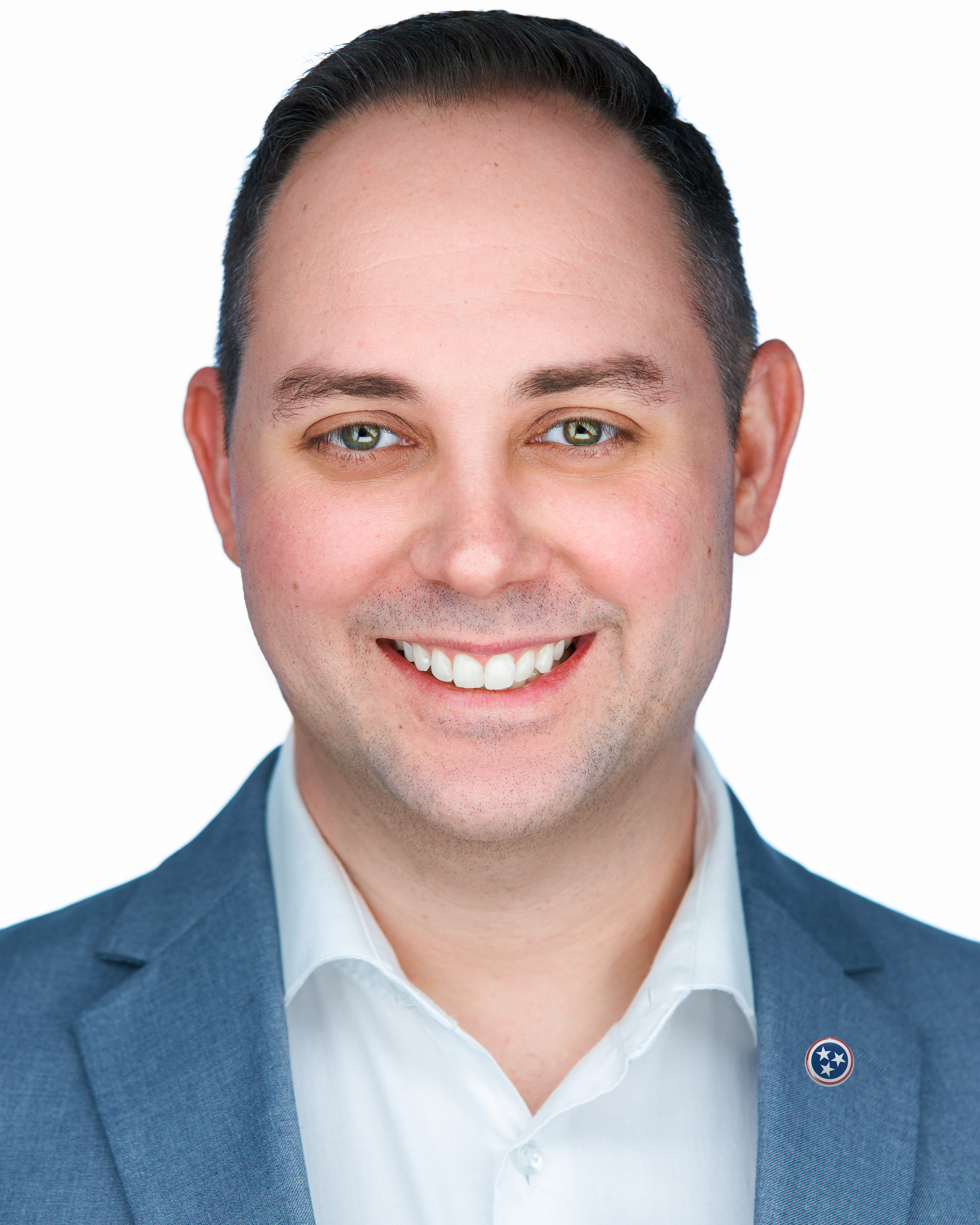

Nominee	Aron Maberry	Garfield Scott
Party	Republican	Democratic
Popular vote	23,249	10,950
Percentage	67.98%	32.02%
- County results Maberry: 60–70%
Representative before election
Curtis Johnson
Republican
Elected Representative
Aron Maberry
Republican

The 68th district is located in Middle Tennessee and consists of a section of Clarksville in eastern Montgomery County. Incumbent Republican Curtis Johnson had represented the district since 2005. Johnson did not run for re-election. Republican Aron Maberry ran on school choice and won the open seat.

=== Republican primary ===
2024 Tennessee House of Representatives District 68 Republican Primary
Party	Candidate	Votes	%
Republican	Aron Maberry	2,568	43.33%
Republican	Joe Smith	2,210	37.29%
Republican	Carol Duffin	726	12.25%
Republican	Greg Gilman	422	7.12%
Total votes		5,926	100.00%

=== Democratic primary ===
2024 Tennessee House of Representatives District 68 Democratic Primary
Party	Candidate	Votes	%
Democratic	Garfield Scott	1,626	100.00%
Total votes		1,626	100.00%

=== General election ===
==== Predictions ====
Source	Ranking
CNalysis	Solid R

==== Results ====
2024 Tennessee House of Representatives District 68 general election
Party	Candidate	Votes	%
Republican	Aron Maberry	23,249	67.98%
Democratic	Garfield Scott	10,950	32.02%
Total votes		34,199	100.00%
Republican hold			

== District 69 ==
2024 Tennessee House of Representatives 69th district election
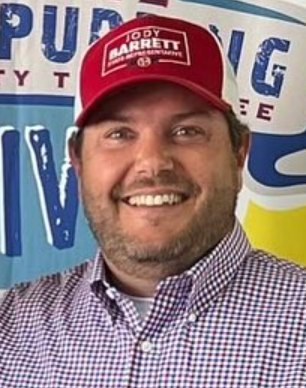
Nominee	Jody Barrett
Party	Republican
Popular vote	23,839
Percentage	100.00%
Representative before election
Jody Barrett
Republican
Elected Representative
Jody Barrett
Republican

The 69th district is located in Middle Tennessee and includes all of Hickman and Lewis Counties, as well as the western part of Dickson County. Incumbent Republican Jody Barrett has represented the district since 2023.

=== Republican primary ===
2024 Tennessee House of Representatives District 69 Republican Primary
Party	Candidate	Votes	%
Republican	Jody Barrett (inc.)	3,672	83.13%
Republican	Ronny George	745	16.87%
Total votes		4,417	100.00%

=== General election ===
2024 Tennessee House of Representatives District 69 Election
Party	Candidate	Votes	%
Republican	Jody Barrett (inc.)	23,839	100.00%
Total votes		23,839	100.00%

== District 70 ==
2024 Tennessee House of Representatives 70th district election
Nominee	Clay Doggett	Jason Luttrell
Party	Republican	Democratic
Popular vote	25,462	4,965
Percentage	83.68%	16.32%
Representative before election
Clay Doggett
Republican
Elected Representative
Clay Doggett
Republican

The 70th district is located in Middle Tennessee and includes all of Giles County, as well as parts of Lawrence and Lincoln Counties. Incumbent Republican Clay Doggett has represented the district since 2019.

=== Republican primary ===
2024 Tennessee House of Representatives District 70 Republican Primary
Party	Candidate	Votes	%
Republican	Clay Doggett (inc.)	4,310	100.00%
Total votes		4,310	100.00%

=== Democratic primary ===
2024 Tennessee House of Representatives District 70 Democratic Primary
Party	Candidate	Votes	%
Democratic	Jason Luttrell	721	100.00%
Total votes		721	100.00%

=== General election ===
==== Predictions ====
Source	Ranking
CNalysis	Solid R

==== Results ====
2024 Tennessee House of Representatives District 70 general election
Party	Candidate	Votes	%
Republican	Clay Doggett (incumbent)	25,462	83.68%
Democratic	Jason Luttrell	4,965	16.32%
Total votes		30,427	100.00%
Republican hold			

== District 71 ==
2024 Tennessee House of Representatives 71st district election
Nominee	Kip Capley	Tim Coy
Party	Republican	Democratic
Popular vote	25,607	5,853
Percentage	81.40%	18.60%
Representative before election
Kip Capley
Republican
Elected Representative
Kip Capley
Republican

The 71st district is located in southern Middle Tennessee and includes all of Wayne, and parts the western part of Maury County as well as parts of Hardin and Lawrence Counties. Incumbent Republican Kip Capley has represented the district since 2023.

=== Republican primary ===
2024 Tennessee House of Representatives District 71 Republican Primary
Party	Candidate	Votes	%
Republican	Kip Capley (inc.)	4,023	100.00%
Total votes		4,023	100.00%

=== Democratic primary ===
2024 Tennessee House of Representatives District 71 Democratic Primary
Party	Candidate	Votes	%
Democratic	Tim Coy	610	100.00%
Total votes		610	100.00%

=== General election ===
==== Predictions ====
Source	Ranking
CNalysis	Solid R

==== Results ====
2024 Tennessee House of Representatives District 71 general election
Party	Candidate	Votes	%
Republican	Kip Capley (incumbent)	25,607	81.40%
Democratic	Tim Coy	5,853	18.60%
Total votes		31,460	100.00%
Republican hold			

== District 72 ==
2024 Tennessee House of Representatives 72nd district election
Nominee	Kirk Haston
Party	Republican
Popular vote	25,924
Percentage	100.00%
Representative before election
Kirk Haston
Republican
Elected Representative
Kirk Haston
Republican

The 72nd district is located mainly in West Tennessee and includes all of Chester, Decatur, and Perry County, as well as parts of Hardin and Henderson Counties. Incumbent Republican Kirk Haston has represented the district since 2019.

=== Republican primary ===
2024 Tennessee House of Representatives District 72 Republican Primary
Party	Candidate	Votes	%
Republican	Kirk Haston (inc.)	3,904	100.00%
Total votes		3,904	100.00%

=== General election ===
2024 Tennessee House of Representatives District 72 Election
Party	Candidate	Votes	%
Republican	Kirk Haston (inc.)	25,924	100.00%
Total votes		25,924	100.00%

== District 73 ==
2024 Tennessee House of Representatives 73rd district election
Nominee	Chris Todd
Party	Republican
Popular vote	24,238
Percentage	100.00%
Representative before election
Chris Todd
Republican
Elected Representative
Chris Todd
Republican

The 73rd district is located in West Tennessee and includes a part of Madison County and parts of Jackson. Incumbent Republican Chris Todd has represented the district since 2019.

=== Republican primary ===
2024 Tennessee House of Representatives District 73 Republican Primary
Party	Candidate	Votes	%
Republican	Chris Todd (inc.)	5,130	67.58%
Republican	Jimmy Harris	2,461	32.42%
Total votes		7,591	100.00%

=== General election ===
2024 Tennessee House of Representatives District 73 Election
Party	Candidate	Votes	%
Republican	Chris Todd (inc.)	24,238	100.00%
Total votes		24,238	100.00%

== District 74 ==
2024 Tennessee House of Representatives 74th district election
Nominee	Jay Reedy
Party	Republican
Popular vote	24,464
Percentage	100.00%
Representative before election
Jay Reedy
Republican
Elected Representative
Jay Reedy
Republican

The 74th district is located in Middle and West Tennessee and includes Benton, Houston, Humphreys, Stewart, and part of Henry County. Incumbent Republican Jay Reedy has represented the district since 2015.

=== Republican primary ===
2024 Tennessee House of Representatives District 74 Republican Primary
Party	Candidate	Votes	%
Republican	Jay Reedy (inc.)	4,155	100.00%
Total votes		4,155	100.00%

=== General election ===
2024 Tennessee House of Representatives District 74 Election
Party	Candidate	Votes	%
Republican	Jay Reedy (inc.)	24,464	100.00%
Total votes		24,464	100.00%

== District 75 ==
2024 Tennessee House of Representatives 75th district election
Nominee	Jeff Burkhart	Allie Phillips
Party	Republican	Democratic
Popular vote	11,164	9,230
Percentage	54.74%	45.26%
- Precinct results Burkhart: 50–60% 60–70% 70–80% 80–90% Phillips: 50–60%
Representative before election
Jeff Burkhart
Republican
Elected Representative
Jeff Burkhart
Republican

The 75th district is located in Middle Tennessee and consists of a section of Clarksville in western Montgomery County. Incumbent Republican Jeff Burkhart had represented the district since 2023. He won re-election with a margin of 9.4%. On the concurrent presidential election, Donald Trump won the district with a margin of 12.6%.

=== Republican primary ===
2024 Tennessee House of Representatives District 75 Republican Primary
Party	Candidate	Votes	%
Republican	Jeff Burkhart (inc.)	1,160	100.00%
Total votes		1,160	100.00%

=== Democratic primary ===
2024 Tennessee House of Representatives District 75 Democratic Primary
Party	Candidate	Votes	%
Democratic	Allie Phillips	901	100.00%
Total votes		901	100.00%

=== General election ===
==== Predictions ====
Source	Ranking
CNalysis	Solid R

==== Results ====
2024 Tennessee House of Representatives District 75 Election
Party	Candidate	Votes	%
Republican	Jeff Burkhart (incumbent)	11,164	54.74%
Democratic	Allie Phillips	9,230	45.26%
Total votes		20,394	100.00%
Republican hold			

== District 76 ==
2024 Tennessee House of Representatives 76th district election
Nominee	Tandy Darby	James Hart
Party	Republican	Independent
Popular vote	21,373	3,946
Percentage	84.41%	15.59%
Representative before election
Tandy Darby
Republican
Elected Representative
Tandy Darby
Republican

The 76th district is located in West Tennessee and includes all of Weakley and part of Carroll and Henry Counties. Incumbent Republican Tandy Darby has represented the district since 2021.

=== Republican primary ===
2024 Tennessee House of Representatives District 76 Republican Primary
Party	Candidate	Votes	%
Republican	Tandy Darby (inc.)	6,337	100.00%
Total votes		6,337	100.00%

=== General election ===
==== Predictions ====
Source	Ranking
CNalysis	Solid R

==== Results ====
2024 Tennessee House of Representatives District 76 Election
Party	Candidate	Votes	%
Republican	Tandy Darby (incumbent)	21,373	84.41%
Independent	James Hart	3,946	15.59%
Total votes		25,319	100.00%
Republican hold			

== District 77 ==
2024 Tennessee House of Representatives 77th district election
Nominee	Rusty Grills
Party	Republican
Popular vote	20,457
Percentage	100.00%
Representative before election
Rusty Grills
Republican
Elected Representative
Rusty Grills
Republican

The 77th district is located in West Tennessee and includes Dyer, Lake, and parts of Obion County. Incumbent Republican Rusty Grills has represented the district since 2020.

=== Republican primary ===
2024 Tennessee House of Representatives District 77 Republican Primary
Party	Candidate	Votes	%
Republican	Rusty Grills (inc.)	4,169	71.52%
Republican	James T. "Bubba" Cobb	1,660	28.48%
Total votes		5,829	100.00%

=== General election ===
2024 Tennessee House of Representatives District 77 Election
Party	Candidate	Votes	%
Republican	Rusty Grills (inc.)	20,457	100.00%
Total votes		20,457	100.00%

== District 78 ==
2024 Tennessee House of Representatives 78th district election
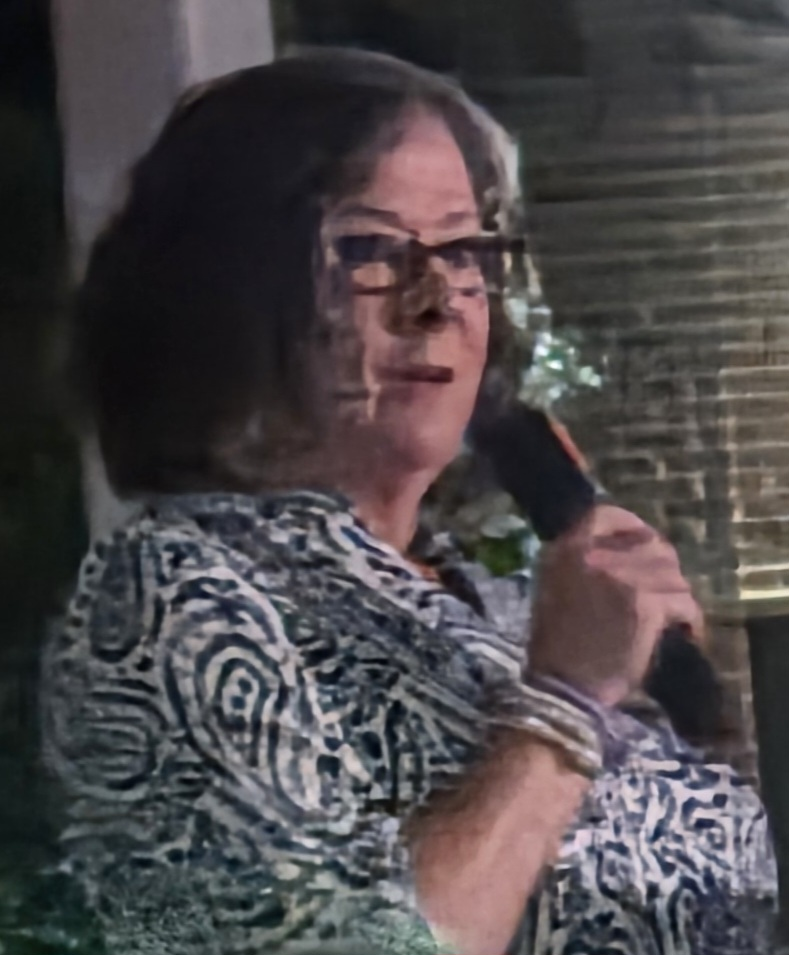

Nominee	Mary Littleton	Deborah Castle Doyle
Party	Republican	Democratic
Popular vote	23,678	8,270
Percentage	74.11%	25.89%
- County results Littleton: 70–80%
Representative before election
Mary Littleton
Republican
Elected Representative
Mary Littleton
Republican

The 78th district is located in Middle Tennessee and consists of Cheatham County and the eastern half of Dickson County. The district includes the cities of Ashland City, Pleasant View, and part of Dickson. Incumbent Republican Mary Littleton has represented the district since 2013.

=== Republican primary ===
2024 Tennessee House of Representatives District 78 Republican Primary
Party	Candidate	Votes	%
Republican	Mary Littleton (inc.)	3,152	75.41%
Republican	Justin Spurlock	1,028	24.59%
Total votes		4,180	100.00%

=== Democratic primary ===
2024 Tennessee House of Representatives District 78 Democratic Primary
Party	Candidate	Votes	%
Democratic	Deborah Castle Doyle	1,362	100.00%
Total votes		1,362	100.00%

=== General election ===
==== Predictions ====
Source	Ranking
CNalysis	Solid R

==== Results ====
2024 Tennessee House of Representatives District 78 general election
Party	Candidate	Votes	%
Republican	Mary Littleton (incumbent)	23,678	74.11%
Democratic	Deborah Castle Doyle	8,270	25.89%
Total votes		31,948	100.00%
Republican hold			

== District 79 ==
2024 Tennessee House of Representatives 79th district election
Nominee	Brock Martin
Party	Republican
Popular vote	21,658
Percentage	100.00%
Representative before election
Brock Martin
Republican
Elected Representative
Brock Martin
Republican

The 79th district is located in West Tennessee and includes parts of Carroll, Gibson, and Henderson Counties. Incumbent Republican Brock Martin has represented the district since 2023.

=== Republican primary ===
2024 Tennessee House of Representatives District 79 Republican Primary
Party	Candidate	Votes	%
Republican	Brock Martin (inc.)	3,380	100.00%
Total votes		3,380	100.00%

=== General election ===
2024 Tennessee House of Representatives District 79 Election
Party	Candidate	Votes	%
Republican	Brock Martin (inc.)	21,658	100.00%
Total votes		21,658	100.00%

== District 80 ==
2024 Tennessee House of Representatives 80th district election
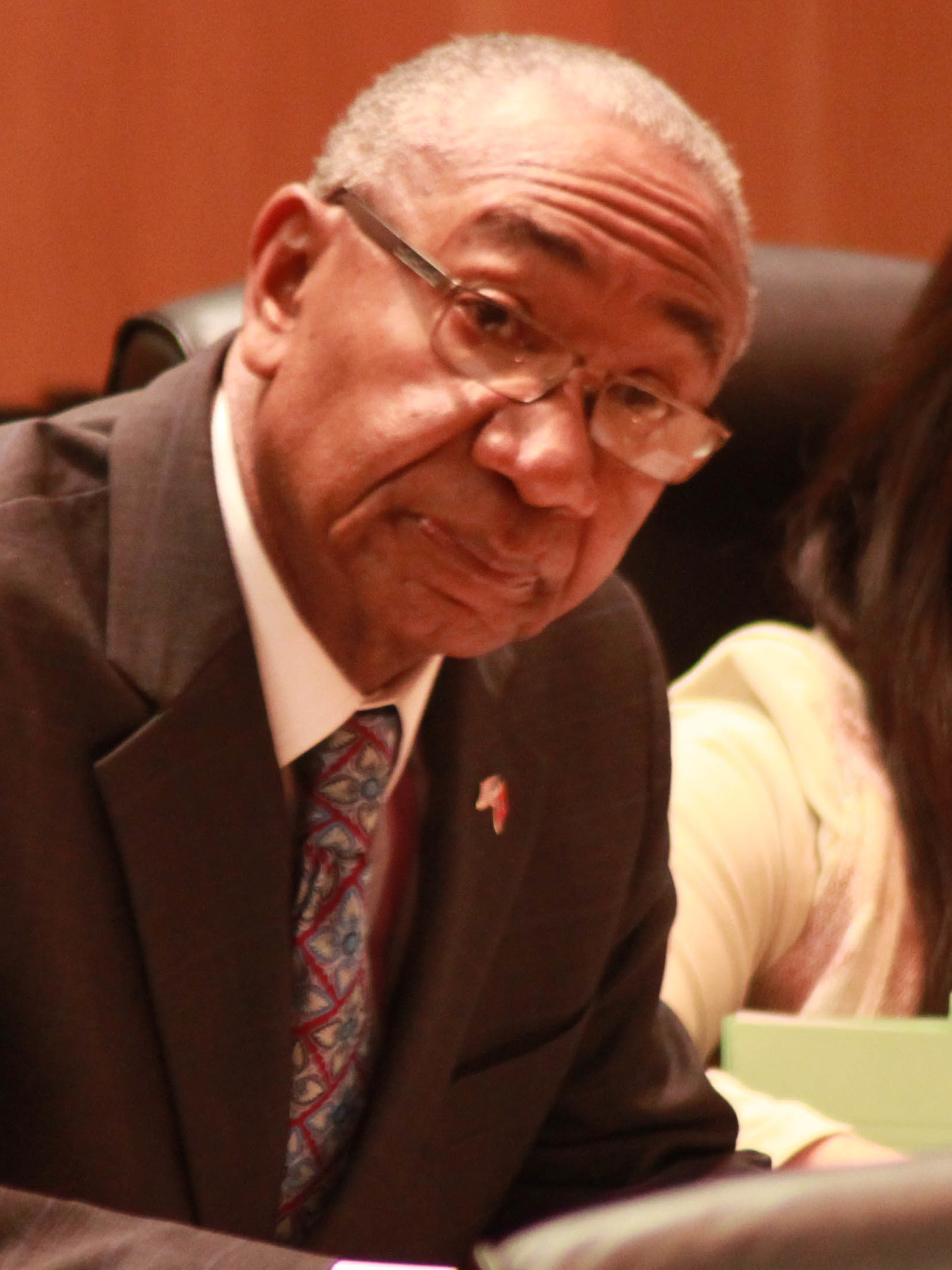

Nominee	Johnny Shaw	Brad Grantham
Party	Democratic	Republican
Popular vote	12,140	7,843
Percentage	60.75%	39.25%
- County results Shaw: 60–70% 70–80% Grantham: 50–60%
Representative before election
Johnny Shaw
Democratic
Elected Representative
Johnny Shaw
Democratic

The 80th district is located in West Tennessee and consists of most of Hardeman County and parts of Haywood and Madison Counties. The district includes the cities of Bolivar, Brownsville, and a part of Jackson. Incumbent Democrat Johnny Shaw has represented the district since 2001. He won re-election with a margin of 21.5%. On the concurrent presidential election, Kamala Harris only won the district with a margin of 7.3%.

=== Republican primary ===
2024 Tennessee House of Representatives District 80 Republican Primary
Party	Candidate	Votes	%
Republican	Brad Grantham	1,808	100.00%
Total votes		1,808	100.00%

=== Democratic primary ===
2024 Tennessee House of Representatives District 80 Democratic Primary
Party	Candidate	Votes	%
Democratic	Johnny Shaw (inc.)	2,494	72.95%
Democratic	Shelia L. Godwin	537	15.71%
Democratic	Jonathan Joy	388	11.35%
Total votes		3,419	100.00%

=== General election ===
==== Predictions ====
Source	Ranking
CNalysis	Solid D

==== Results ====
2024 Tennessee House of Representatives District 80 Election
Party	Candidate	Votes	%
Democratic	Johnny Shaw (inc.)	12,140	60.75%
Republican	Brad Grantham	7,843	39.25%
Total votes		19,983	100.00%
Democratic hold			

== District 81 ==
2024 Tennessee House of Representatives 81tst district election
Nominee	Debra Moody
Party	Republican
Popular vote	23,789
Percentage	100.00%
Representative before election
Debra Moody
Republican
Elected Representative
Debra Moody
Republican

The 81st district is located in West Tennessee and includes Tipton and part of Haywood County. Incumbent Republican Debra Moody has represented the district since 2013.

=== Republican primary ===
2024 Tennessee House of Representatives District 81 Republican Primary
Party	Candidate	Votes	%
Republican	Debra Moody (inc.)	2,759	100.00%
Total votes		2,759	100.00%

=== General election ===
2024 Tennessee House of Representatives District 81 Election
Party	Candidate	Votes	%
Republican	Debra Moody (inc.)	23,789	100.00%
Total votes		23,789	100.00%

== District 82 ==
2024 Tennessee House of Representatives 82nd district election
Nominee	Chris Hurt
Party	Republican
Popular vote	20,007
Percentage	100.00%
Representative before election
Chris Hurt
Republican
Elected Representative
Chris Hurt
Republican

The 82nd district is located in West Tennessee and includes all of Crockett and Lauderdale County as well as parts of Gibson and Obion County. Incumbent Republican Chris Hurt has represented the district since 2019.

=== Republican primary ===
2024 Tennessee House of Representatives District 82 Republican Primary
Party	Candidate	Votes	%
Republican	Chris Hurt (inc.)	4,482	100.00%
Total votes		4,482	100.00%

=== General election ===
2024 Tennessee House of Representatives District 82 Election
Party	Candidate	Votes	%
Republican	Chris Hurt (inc.)	20,007	100.00%
Total votes		20,007	100.00%

== District 83 ==
2024 Tennessee House of Representatives 83rd district election
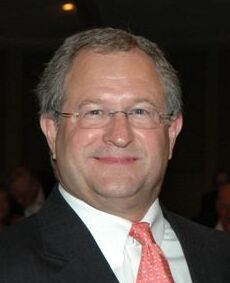

Nominee	Mark White	Noah Nordstrom
Party	Republican	Democratic
Popular vote	19,910	14,488
Percentage	57.88%	42.12%
- County results White: 50–60%
Representative before election
Mark White
Republican
Elected Representative
Mark White
Republican

The 83rd district is located in West Tennessee and consists of some Memphis suburbs in southeastern Shelby County. The district includes the city of Germantown and part of the neighborhood White Station. Incumbent Republican Mark White has represented the district since 2010. He won re-election with a margin of 15.8%. On the concurrent presidential election, Donald Trump only won the district with a margin of 8.0%.

=== Republican primary ===
2024 Tennessee House of Representatives District 83 Republican Primary
Party	Candidate	Votes	%
Republican	Mark White (inc.)	5,553	100.00%
Total votes		5,553	100.00%

=== Democratic primary ===
2024 Tennessee House of Representatives District 83 Democratic Primary
Party	Candidate	Votes	%
Democratic	Noah Nordstrom	2,618	100.00%
Total votes		2,618	100.00%

=== General election ===
==== Predictions ====
Source	Ranking
CNalysis	Solid R

==== Results ====
2024 Tennessee House of Representatives District 83 general election
Party	Candidate	Votes	%
Republican	Mark White (incumbent)	19,910	57.88%
Democratic	Noah Nordstrom	14,488	42.12%
Total votes		34,398	100.00%
Republican hold			

== District 84 ==
2024 Tennessee House of Representatives 84th district election
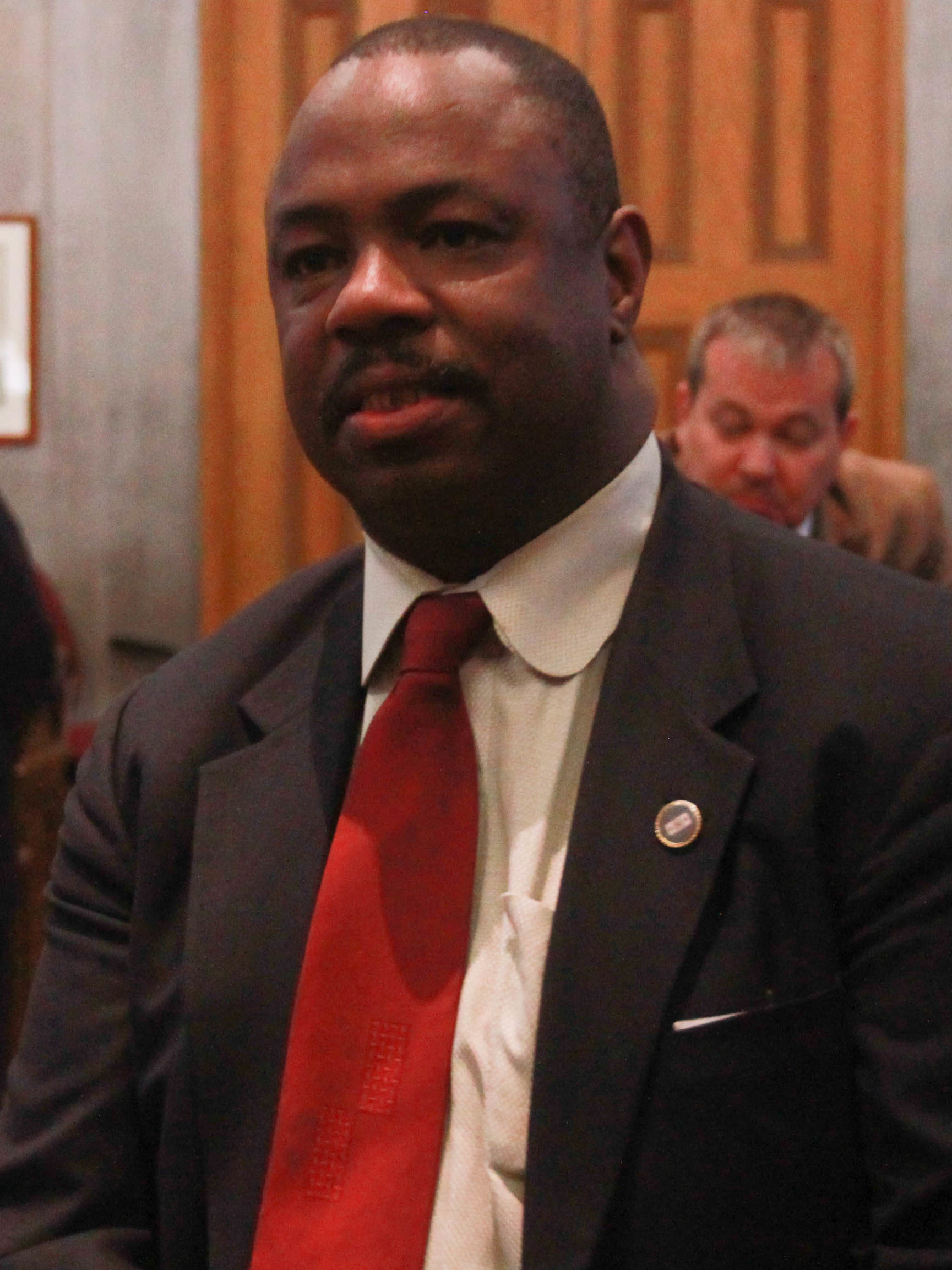
Nominee	Joe Towns
Party	Democratic
Popular vote	13,785
Percentage	100.00%
Representative before election
Joe Towns
Democratic
Elected Representative
Joe Towns
Democratic

The 84th district is located in West Tennessee and includes parts of the city of Memphis in southern Shelby County. Incumbent Democrat Joe Towns has represented the district since 1995.

=== Democratic primary ===
2024 Tennessee House of Representatives District 84 Democratic Primary
Party	Candidate	Votes	%
Democratic	Joe Towns (inc.)	2,321	83.43%
Democratic	Vernell Williams	461	16.57%
Total votes		2,782	100.00%

=== General election ===
2024 Tennessee House of Representatives District 84 Election
Party	Candidate	Votes	%
Democratic	Joe Towns (incumbent)	13,785	100.00%

== District 85 ==
2024 Tennessee House of Representatives 85th district election
Nominee	Jesse Chism
Party	Democratic
Popular vote	23,721
Percentage	99.92%
Representative before election
Jesse Chism
Democratic
Elected Representative
Jesse Chism
Democratic

The 85th district is located in West Tennessee and includes parts of the city of Memphis in southern Shelby County. Incumbent Democrat Jesse Chism has represented the district since 2019.

=== Democratic primary ===
2024 Tennessee House of Representatives District 85 Democratic Primary
Party	Candidate	Votes	%
Democratic	Jesse Chism (inc.)	5,529	100.00%
Total votes		5,529	100.00%

=== General election ===
2024 Tennessee House of Representatives District 85 Election
Party	Candidate	Votes	%
Democratic	Jesse Chism (incumbent)	99.92%	23,721
Write-in		19	0.08%
Total votes		23,740	100.00%

== District 86 ==
2024 Tennessee House of Representatives 86th district election
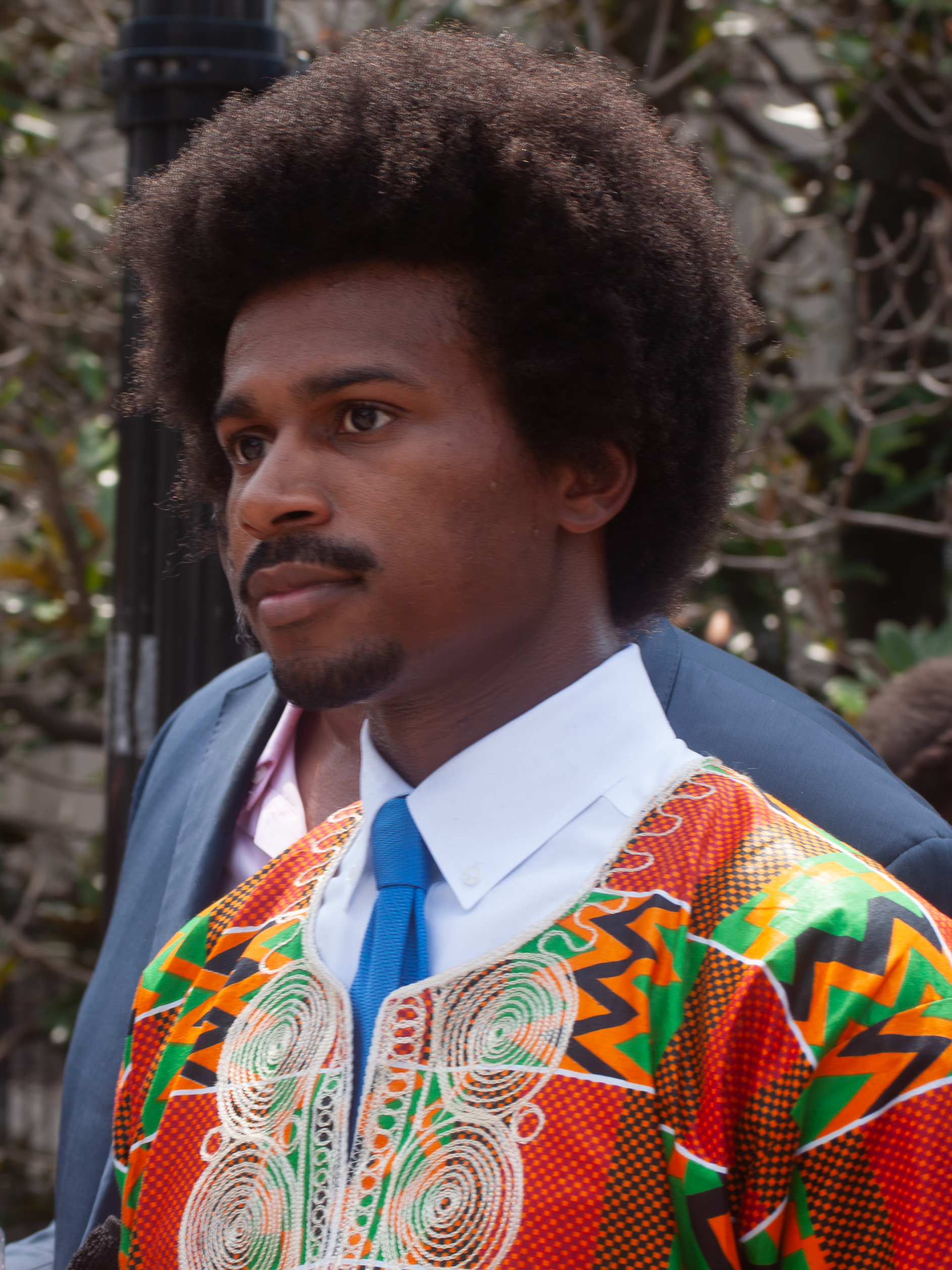

Nominee	Justin J. Pearson	William P Mouzon
Party	Democratic	Independent
Popular vote	15,612	4,436
Percentage	77.87%	22.13%
Representative before election
Justin J. Pearson
Democratic
Elected Representative
Justin J. Pearson
Democratic

The 86th district is located in West Tennessee and includes parts of the city of Memphis, primarily in western Shelby County. It covers areas such as Downtown, South Memphis, Benjestown, and Northaven. Incumbent Democrat Justin J. Pearson has represented the district since 2023. He was first elected in a special election following the death of Rep. Barbara Cooper and won a full term in 2024.

=== Democratic primary ===
2024 Tennessee House of Representatives District 86 Democratic Primary
Party	Candidate	Votes	%
Democratic	Justin J. Pearson (inc.)	3,783	93.41%
Democratic	David Page	267	6.59%
Total votes		4,050	100.00%

=== General election ===
==== Predictions ====
Source	Ranking
CNalysis	Solid D

==== Results ====
2024 Tennessee House of Representatives District 86 Election
Party	Candidate	Votes	%
Democratic	Justin J. Pearson (incumbent)	15,612	77.87%
Independent	William P Mouzon	4,436	22.13%
Total votes		20,048	100.00%
Democratic hold			

== District 87 ==
2024 Tennessee House of Representatives 87th district election
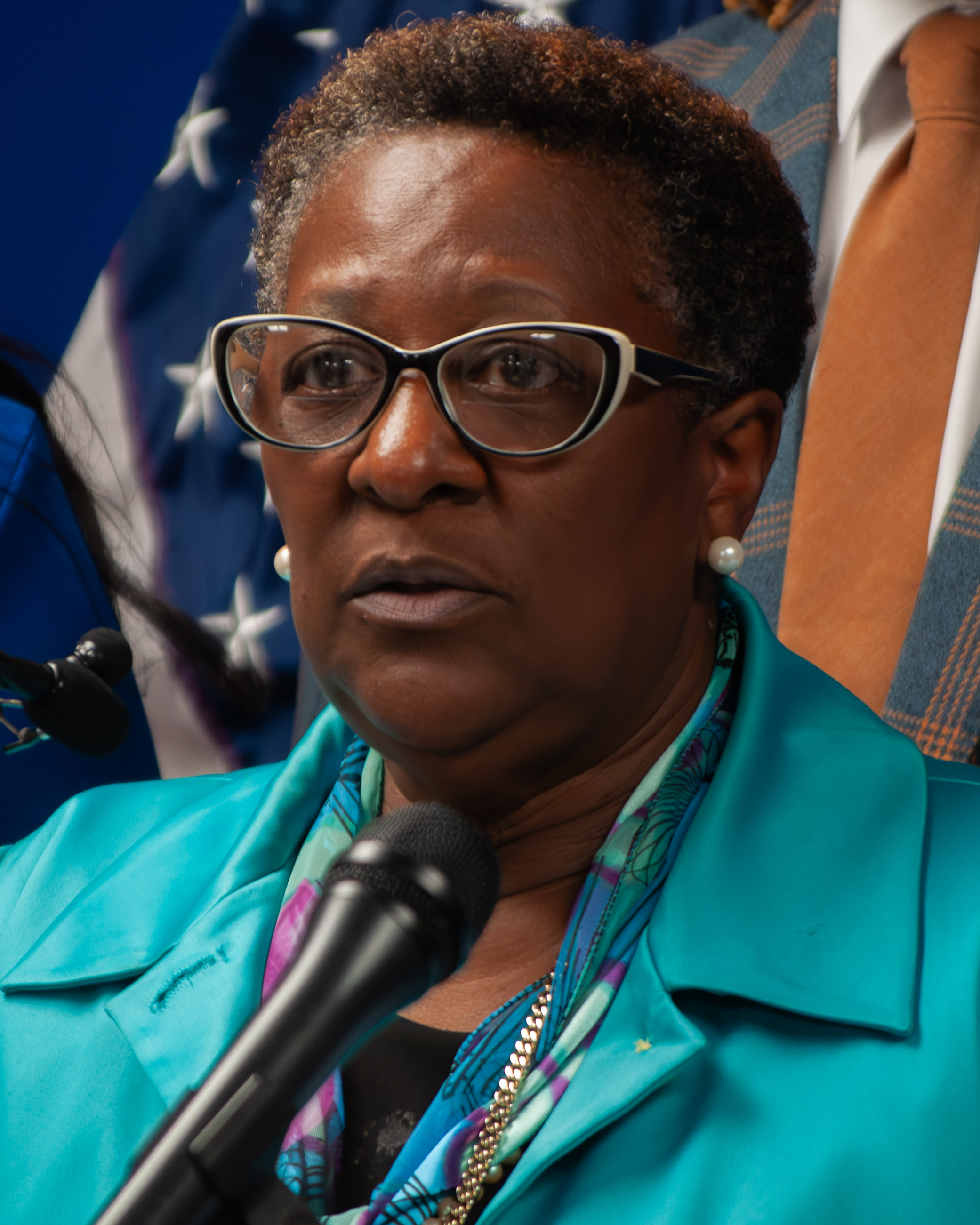
Nominee	Karen Camper
Party	Democratic
Popular vote	13,669
Percentage	100.00%
Representative before election
Karen Camper
Democratic
Elected Representative
Karen Camper
Democratic

The 87th district is located in West Tennessee in Memphis, covering part of Shelby County, and includes Whitehaven. Incumbent Democrat Karen Camper has represented the district since winning a special election in March 2008. She serves as House Minority Leader and chairs key committees. Camper ran unopposed in both the 2024 primary and general election, securing 100% of the vote.

=== Democratic primary ===
2024 Tennessee House of Representatives District 87 Democratic Primary
Party	Candidate	Votes	%
Democratic	Karen Camper (inc.)	3,055	100.00%
Total votes		3,055	100.00%

=== General election ===
2024 Tennessee House of Representatives District 87 Election
Party	Candidate	Votes	%
Democratic	Karen Camper (incumbent)	13,669	100.00%

== District 88 ==
2024 Tennessee House of Representatives 88th district election
Nominee	Larry Miller	Larry Hunter
Party	Democratic	Republican
Popular vote	15,043	5,896
Percentage	71.84%	28.16%
Representative before election
Larry Miller
Democratic
Elected Representative
Larry Miller
Democratic

The 88th district is located in West Tennessee and includes parts of central Shelby County. Incumbent Democrat Larry Miller has represented the district since 1995.

=== Republican primary ===
2024 Tennessee House of Representatives District 88 Republican Primary
Party	Candidate	Votes	%
Republican	Larry Hunter	1,024	100.00%
Total votes		1,024	100.00%

=== Democratic primary ===
2024 Tennessee House of Representatives District 88 Democratic Primary
Party	Candidate	Votes	%
Democratic	Larry Miller (inc.)	3,180	100.00%
Total votes		3,180	100.00%

=== General election ===
==== Predictions ====
Source	Ranking
CNalysis	Solid D

==== Results ====
2024 Tennessee House of Representatives District 88 Election
Party	Candidate	Votes	%
Democratic	Larry Miller (incumbent)	15,043	71.84%
Republican	Larry Hunter	5,896	28.16%
Total votes		20,939	100.00%
Democratic hold			

== District 89 ==
2024 Tennessee House of Representatives 89th district election
Nominee	Justin Lafferty	Cary Hammond
Party	Republican	Democratic
Popular vote	23,733	11,920
Percentage	66.57%	33.43%
Representative before election
Justin Lafferty
Republican
Elected Representative
Justin Lafferty
Republican

The 89th district is located in East Tennessee and includes parts of western Knox County, including Karns. Incumbent Republican Justin Lafferty has represented the district since 2019.

=== Republican primary ===
2024 Tennessee House of Representatives District 89 Republican Primary
Party	Candidate	Votes	%
Republican	Justin Lafferty (inc.)	3,659	100.00%
Total votes		3,659	100.00%

=== Democratic primary ===
2024 Tennessee House of Representatives District 89 Democratic Primary
Party	Candidate	Votes	%
Democratic	Cary Hammond	2,371	100.00%
Total votes		2,371	100.00%

=== General election ===
==== Predictions ====
Source	Ranking
CNalysis	Solid R

==== Results ====
2024 Tennessee House of Representatives District 89 Election
Party	Candidate	Votes	%
Republican	Justin Lafferty (incumbent)	23,733	66.57%
Democratic	Cary Hammond	11,920	33.43%
Total votes		35,653	100.00%
Republican hold			

== District 90 ==
2024 Tennessee House of Representatives 90th district election
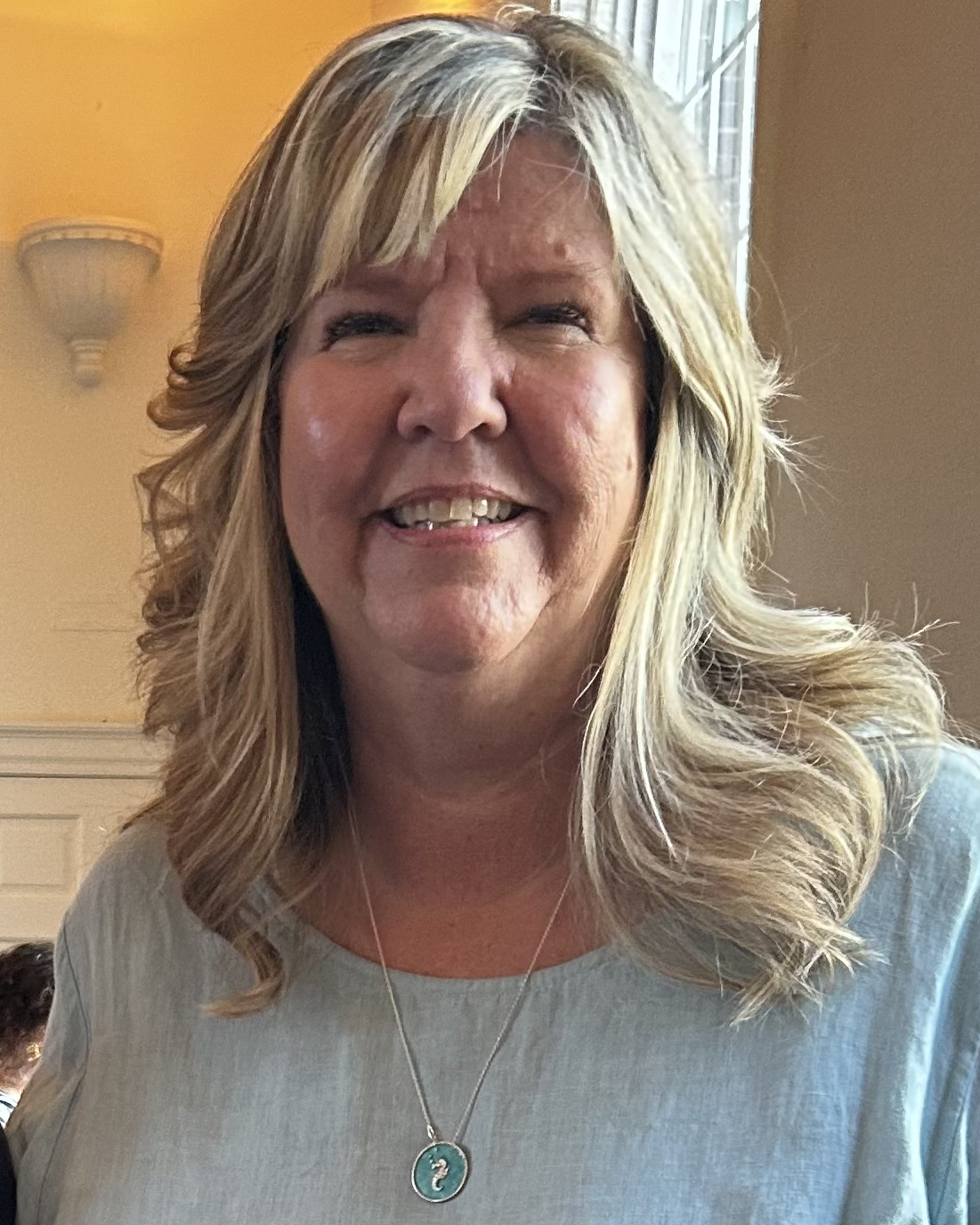
Nominee	Gloria Johnson
Party	Democratic
Popular vote	16,372
Percentage	99.69%
Representative before election
Gloria Johnson
Democratic
Elected Representative
Gloria Johnson
Democratic

The 90th district is located in East Tennessee and consists of several neighborhoods in the city of Knoxville, which is in Knox County. It includes West Knoxville and most of North Knoxville. Incumbent Democrat Gloria Johnson has represented the district since 2019. Gloria Johnson ran for the concurrent senate election, as well as her house seat. She lost her Senate bid but won re-election unopposed in her house seat.

=== Democratic primary ===
2024 Tennessee House of Representatives District 90 Democratic Primary
Party	Candidate	Votes	%
Democratic	Gloria Johnson (inc.)	4,041	100.00%
Total votes		4,041	100.00%

=== General election ===
2024 Tennessee House of Representatives District 90 Election
Party	Candidate	Votes	%
Democratic	Gloria Johnson (incumbent)	16,372	99.69%
Write-in		51	0.31%
Total votes		16,423	100.00%

== District 91 ==
2024 Tennessee House of Representatives 91st district election
Nominee	Torrey Harris
Party	Democratic
Popular vote	17,049
Percentage	100.00%
Representative before election
Torrey Harris
Democratic
Elected Representative
Torrey Harris
Democratic

The 91st district is located in West Tennessee and includes parts of the city of Memphis in southwestern Shelby County. Incumbent Democrat Torrey Harris has represented the district since 2021.

=== Democratic primary ===
2024 Tennessee House of Representatives District 91 Democratic Primary
Party	Candidate	Votes	%
Democratic	Torrey Harris (inc.)	3,979	100.00%
Total votes		3,979	100.00%

=== General election ===
2024 Tennessee House of Representatives District 91 Election
Party	Candidate	Votes	%
Democratic	Torrey Harris (incumbent)	17,049	100.00%

== District 92 ==
2024 Tennessee House of Representatives 92nd district election
Nominee	Todd Warner	Teri Mai
Party	Republican	Democratic
Popular vote	25,086	8,569
Percentage	74.54%	25.46%
Representative before election
Todd Warner
Republican
Elected Representative
Todd Warner
Republican

The 92nd district is located in Middle Tennessee and covers all of Marshall County, parts of Franklin County, Marion County, and Lincoln County. Incumbent Republican Todd Warner has represented the district since 2021.

=== Republican primary ===
2024 Tennessee House of Representatives District 92 Republican Primary
Party	Candidate	Votes	%
Republican	Todd Warner (inc.)	5,870	100.00%
Total votes		5,870	100.00%

=== Democratic primary ===
2024 Tennessee House of Representatives District 92 Democratic Primary
Party	Candidate	Votes	%
Democratic	Teri Mai	1,591	100.00%
Total votes		1,591	100.00%

=== General election ===
==== Predictions ====
Source	Ranking
CNalysis	Solid R

==== Results ====
2024 Tennessee House of Representatives District 92 Election
Party	Candidate	Votes	%
Republican	Todd Warner (incumbent)	25,086	74.54%
Democratic	Teri Mai	8,569	25.46%
Total votes		33,655	100.00%
Republican hold			

== District 93 ==
2024 Tennessee House of Representatives 93rd district election
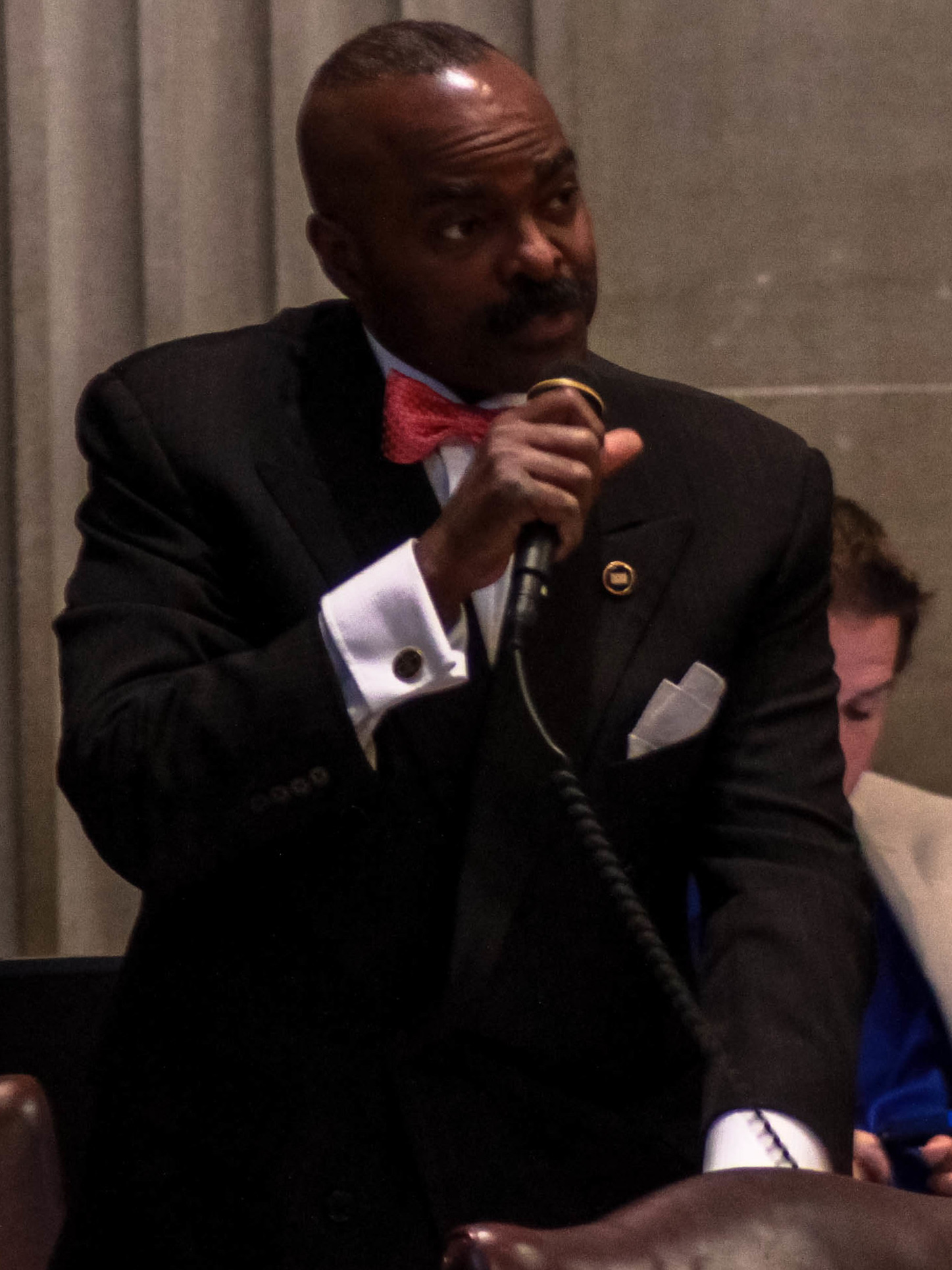

Nominee	G. A. Hardaway	Renarda Renee Clariett
Party	Democratic	Republican
Popular vote	12,398	2,920
Percentage	80.94%	19.06%
Representative before election
G. A. Hardaway
Democratic
Elected Representative
G. A. Hardaway
Democratic

The 93rd district is located in West Tennessee and includes parts of the city of Memphis in central Shelby County. Incumbent Democrat G. A. Hardaway has represented the district since 2007.

=== Republican primary ===
2024 Tennessee House of Representatives District 93 Republican Primary
Party	Candidate	Votes	%
Republican	Renarda Renee Clariett	375	100.00%
Total votes		375	100.00%

=== Democratic primary ===
2024 Tennessee House of Representatives District 93 Democratic Primary
Party	Candidate	Votes	%
Democratic	G. A. Hardaway (inc.)	2,209	75.16%
Democratic	LaShanta Rudd	730	24.84%
Total votes		2,939	100.00%

=== General election ===
==== Predictions ====
Source	Ranking
CNalysis	Solid D

==== Results ====
2024 Tennessee House of Representatives District 93 Election
Party	Candidate	Votes	%
Democratic	G. A. Hardaway (incumbent)	12,398	80.94%
Republican	Renarda Renee Clariett	2,920	19.06%
Total votes		15,318	100.00%
Democratic hold			

== District 94 ==
2024 Tennessee House of Representatives 94th district election
Nominee	Ron Gant	Terry S. Saine
Party	Republican	Democratic
Popular vote	26,053	7,178
Percentage	78.40%	21.60%
Representative before election
Ron Gant
Republican
Elected Representative
Ron Gant
Republican

The 94th district is located in West Tennessee and includes all of Fayette and McNairy County and the southern part of Hardeman County. Incumbent Republican Ron Gant has represented the district since 2017.

=== Republican primary ===
2024 Tennessee House of Representatives District 94 Republican Primary
Party	Candidate	Votes	%
Republican	Ron Gant (inc.)	4,304	100.00%
Total votes		4,304	100.00%

=== Democratic primary ===
2024 Tennessee House of Representatives District 94 Democratic Primary
Party	Candidate	Votes	%
Democratic	Terry S. Saine	1,313	100.00%
Total votes		1,313	100.00%

=== General election ===
==== Predictions ====
Source	Ranking
CNalysis	Solid R

==== Results ====
2024 Tennessee House of Representatives District 94 Election
Party	Candidate	Votes	%
Republican	Ron Gant (incumbent)	26,053	78.40%
Democratic	Terry S. Saine	7,178	21.60%
Total votes		33,231	100.00%
Republican hold			

== District 95 ==
2024 Tennessee House of Representatives 95th district election
Nominee	Kevin Vaughan
Party	Republican
Popular vote	27,790
Percentage	100.00%
Representative before election
Kevin Vaughan
Republican
Elected Representative
Kevin Vaughan
Republican

The 95th district is located in West Tennessee and includes part of Shelby County, particularly areas in the eastern suburbs of Memphis such as most of Collierville, some of Germantown, Lakeland, and Bartlett. Incumbent Republican Kevin Vaughan has represented the district since 2017.

=== Republican primary ===
2024 Tennessee House of Representatives District 95 Republican Primary
Party	Candidate	Votes	%
Republican	Kevin Vaughan (inc.)	4,948	100.00%
Total votes		4,948	100.00%

=== General election ===
2024 Tennessee House of Representatives District 95 Election
Party	Candidate	Votes	%
Republican	Kevin Vaughan (incumbent)	27,790	100.00%
Total votes		27,790	100.00%

== District 96 ==
2024 Tennessee House of Representatives 96th district election
Nominee	Gabby Salinas
Party	Democratic
Popular vote	19,055
Percentage	100.00%
Representative before election
Dwayne Thompson
Democratic
Elected Representative
Gabby Salinas
Democratic

The 96th district is located in West Tennessee and includes a portion of central Shelby County, including parts of Memphis. Incumbent Democrat Dwayne Thompson had represented the district since 2017 but retired in 2024. Democrat Gabby Salinas succeeded him.

=== Democratic primary ===
2024 Tennessee House of Representatives District 96 Democratic Primary
Party	Candidate	Votes	%
Democratic	Gabby Salinas	2,168	43.94%
Democratic	Telisa Franklin	2,036	41.26%
Democratic	Eric Dunn	397	8.05%
Democratic	David Winston	281	5.70%
Democratic	Orrden Williams	52	1.05%
Total votes		4,934	100.00%

=== General election ===
2024 Tennessee House of Representatives District 96 Election
Party	Candidate	Votes	%
Democratic	Gabby Salinas	19,055	100.00%

== District 97 ==
2024 Tennessee House of Representatives 97th district election
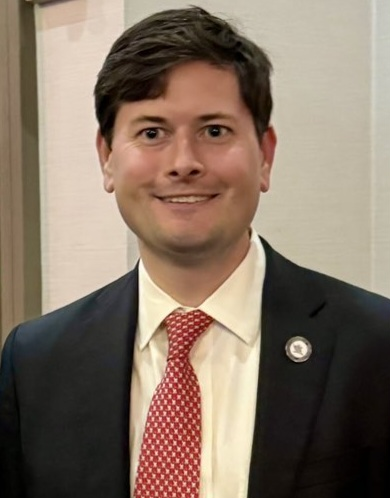

Nominee	John Gillespie	Jesse Huseth
Party	Republican	Democratic
Popular vote	16,368	15,292
Percentage	51.64%	48.24%
- Gillespie: 50–60% 60–70% Huseth: 50–60% 60–70%
Representative before election
John Gillespie
Republican
Elected Representative
John Gillespie
Republican

The 97th district is located in West Tennessee and consists of some neighborhoods in the city of Memphis, which is in Shelby County. It includes East Memphis, Chickasaw Gardens, and part of the neighborhood White Station. The district also includes the park Shelby Farms. Incumbent Republican John Gillespie has represented the district since 2021. He won re-election to a third term with a margin of 3.4%. On the concurrent presidential election, Kamala Harris won the district with a margin of 4.9%.

=== Republican primary ===
2024 Tennessee House of Representatives District 97 Republican Primary
Party	Candidate	Votes	%
Republican	John Gillespie (inc.)	4,910	95.41%
Republican	Christina Oppenhuizen	236	4.59%
Total votes		5,146	100.00%

=== Democratic primary ===
2024 Tennessee House of Representatives District 97 Democratic Primary
Party	Candidate	Votes	%
Democratic	Jesse Huseth	3,099	100.00%
Total votes		3,099	100.00%

=== General election ===
==== Predictions ====
Source	Ranking
CNalysis	Tilt R

==== Results ====
2024 Tennessee House of Representatives District 97 general election
Party	Candidate	Votes	%
Republican	John Gillespie (incumbent)	16,368	51.64%
Democratic	Jesse Huseth	15,292	48.24%
Write-in		39	0.12%
Total votes		31,699	100.00%
Republican hold			

== District 98 ==
2024 Tennessee House of Representatives 98th district election
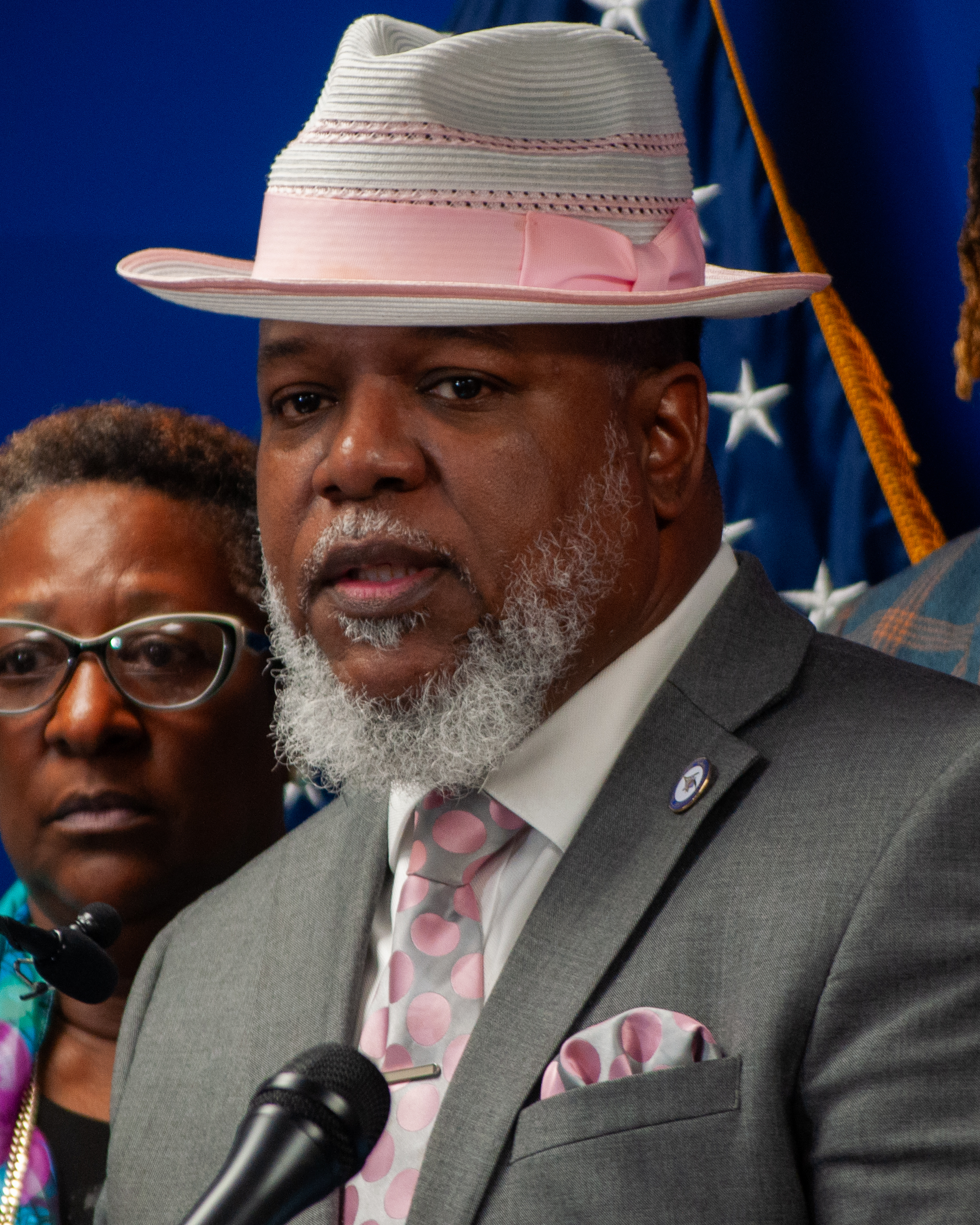

Nominee	Antonio Parkinson	Cecil Hale
Party	Democratic	Republican
Popular vote	15,348	5,410
Percentage	73.94%	26.06%
Representative before election
Antonio Parkinson
Democratic
Elected Representative
Antonio Parkinson
Democratic

The 98th district is located in West Tennessee and includes a portion of central Shelby County, including parts of Memphis. Incumbent Democrat Antonio Parkinson has represented the district since 2011.

=== Republican primary ===
2024 Tennessee House of Representatives District 98 Republican Primary
Party	Candidate	Votes	%
Republican	Cecil Hale	854	98.84%
Write-in		10	1.16%
Total votes		864	100.00%

=== Democratic primary ===
2024 Tennessee House of Representatives District 98 Democratic Primary
Party	Candidate	Votes	%
Democratic	Antonio Parkinson (inc.)	3,336	99.14%
Write-in		29	0.86%
Total votes		3,365	100.00%

=== General election ===
==== Predictions ====
Source	Ranking
CNalysis	Solid D

==== Results ====
2024 Tennessee House of Representatives District 98 Election
Party	Candidate	Votes	%
Democratic	Antonio Parkinson (incumbent)	15,348	73.94%
Republican	Cecil Hale	5,410	26.06%
Total votes		20,758	100.00%
Democratic hold			

== District 99 ==
2024 Tennessee House of Representatives 99th district election
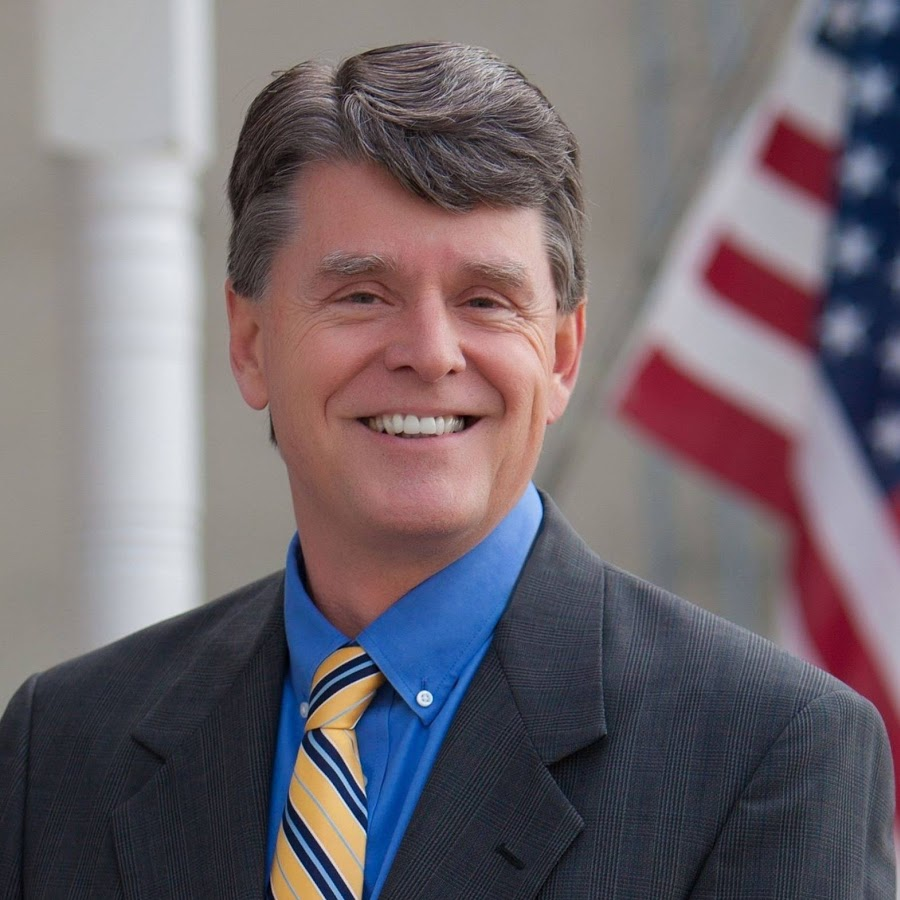

Nominee	Tom Leatherwood	William P Mouzon
Party	Republican	Independent
Popular vote	25,259	8,275
Percentage	75.32%	24.68%
- County results Leatherwood: 70–80%
Representative before election
Tom Leatherwood
Republican
Elected Representative
Tom Leatherwood
Republican

The 99th district is located in suburban Shelby County including parts of Bartlett and Millington as well as Lakeland and Arlington. Republican Tom Leatherwood has represented the district since 2020 and was re-elected in 2024. While the area includes some swing suburbs, the district is currently considered safely Republican.

=== Republican primary ===
2024 Tennessee House of Representatives District 99 Republican Primary
Party	Candidate	Votes	%
Republican	Tom Leatherwood (inc.)	4,742	99.10%
Write-in		43	0.90%
Total votes		4,785	100.00%

=== Democratic primary ===
No candidate qualified for the Democratic primary. 98 write-in votes were cast.

=== General election ===
==== Predictions ====
Source	Ranking
CNalysis	Solid R

==== Results ====
2024 Tennessee House of Representatives District 99 Election
Party	Candidate	Votes	%
Republican	Tom Leatherwood (incumbent)	25,259	75.32%
Independent	William P Mouzon	8,275	24.68%
Total votes		33,534	100.00%
Republican hold			

== See also ==
- 2024 Tennessee elections
- 2024 Tennessee Senate election
- List of Tennessee General Assemblies
