= 2026 United States Senate election in Tennessee =

- November 3, 2026
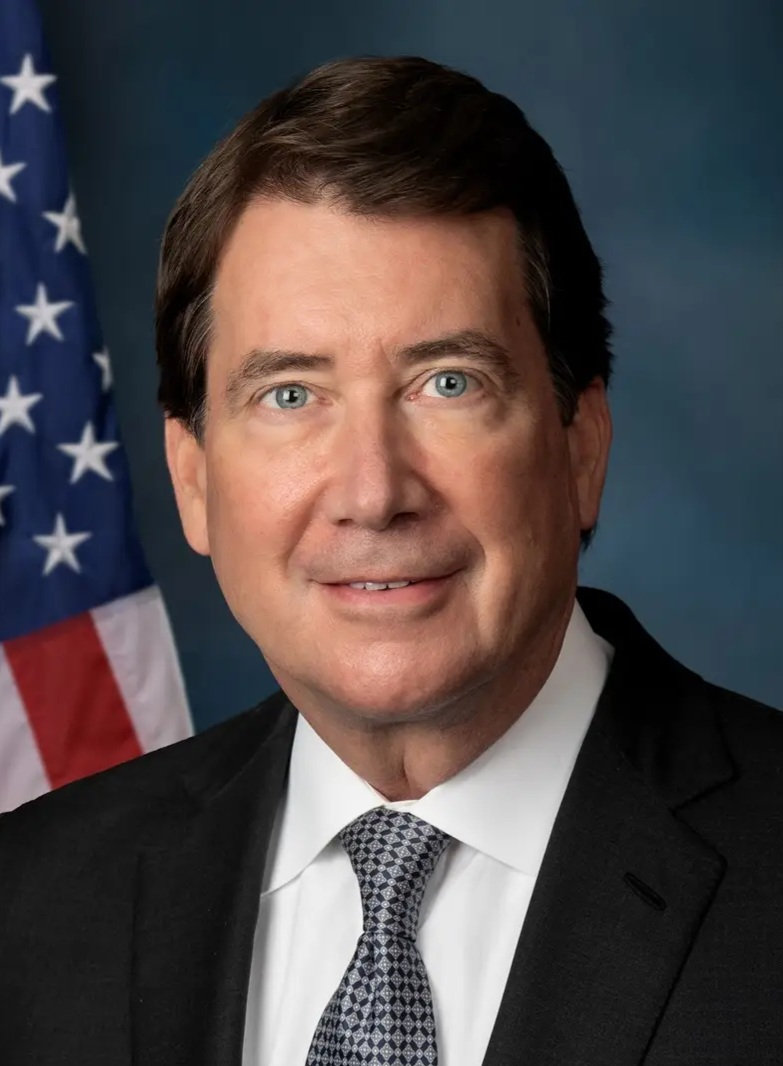

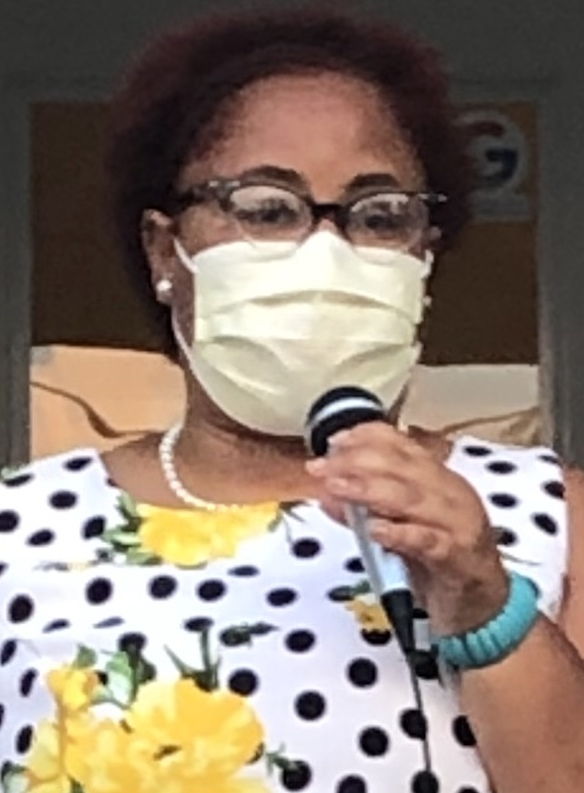
Nominee	Bill Hagerty	Marquita Bradshaw
Party	Republican	Democratic
Popular vote	1,138,457	886,974
Percentage	55.08%	42.91%
- County results Hagerty: 50–60% 60–70% 70–80% 80–90% Bradshaw: 40–50% 50–60% 60–70% 70–80%
U.S. senator before election
Bill Hagerty
Republican
Elected U.S. Senator
Bill Hagerty
Republican

The 2026 United States Senate election in Tennessee was held on November 3, 2026, to elect a member of the United States Senate to represent the state of Tennessee. Republican incumbent Bill Hagerty was re-elected to a second term, defeating Democratic activist Marquita Bradshaw in a rematch of 2020 with 55.1% of the vote.

Primary elections were held on August 6. Hagerty ran unopposed for the Republican nomination. Bradshaw won the Democratic nomination over former state party director Maria Brewer with 54.8% of the vote.

Compared to the 2020 United States Senate election in Tennessee, when Hagerty won by a 27-point margin, his 2026 re-election victory was considerably narrower at 12.2 points. Marquita Bradshaw also gained ground in all 95 counties compared to 2020. Hagerty lost three counties he had carried in 2020: Hamilton, Montgomery, and Rutherford. He narrowly held Knox County, winning it by 1.9 points. Despite the narrower margin, Hagerty received 181,300 more votes than Republican gubernatorial candidate Marsha Blackburn on the same ballot. This marked the closest election for either Senate seat since 2018, when Blackburn won by a similar margin.

== Republican primary ==
=== Candidates ===
==== Nominee ====
- Bill Hagerty, incumbent U.S. senator (2021–present)

=== Endorsements ===
Bill Hagerty

Executive branch officials

- Donald Trump, president of the United States (2017–2021, 2025–present)

U.S. senators

- Marsha Blackburn, Tennessee (2019–present)

Statewide officials

- Bill Lee, governor of Tennessee (2019–present)

Local officials

- Glenn Jacobs, former mayor of Knox County (2018–2026)

Organizations

- Senate Conservatives Fund

=== Fundraising ===
Campaign finance reports as of June 30, 2026
Candidate	Raised	Spent	Cash on hand
Bill Hagerty (R)	$15,967,647	$10,788,276	$5,234,429
Source: Federal Election Commission

=== Results ===
Republican primary results
Party	Candidate	Votes	%
Republican	Bill Hagerty (incumbent)	629,194	100.00%
Write-in		1	0.00%
Total votes		629,195	100.00%

== Democratic primary ==
=== Candidates ===
==== Nominee ====
- Marquita Bradshaw, staffing consultant and nominee for this seat in 2020 and candidate in 2024

==== Eliminated in primary ====
- Maria Brewer, former Tennessee Democratic Party Director of Party Affairs
- Kevin Lee McCants, pastor
- Civil Miller-Watkins, teacher and candidate for U.S. Senate in 2024
- Diana Onyejiaka, businesswoman and professor

=== Fundraising ===
Campaign finance reports as of June 30, 2026
Candidate	Raised	Spent	Cash on hand
Maria Brewer (D)	$9,068	$3,734	$5,333
Civil Miller-Watkins (D)	$6,398	$4,895	$3,008
Marquita Bradshaw (D)	$2,257	$1,293	$1,042
Source: Federal Election Commission

=== Results ===
Results by county: Bradshaw: 30–40%; 40–50%; 50–60%; 60–70%; Brewer: 30–40%; Miller-Watkins: 50–60%; Tie: 30-40%

Results by precinct: Bradshaw: 20–30%; 30–40%; 40–50%; 50–60%; 60–70%; 70–80%; 80–90%; 90–100%; Brewer: 20–30%; 30–40%; 40–50%; 50–60%; 60–70%; 70–80%; McCants: 20–30%; 30–40%; 40–50%; 50–60%; Watkins: 20–30%; 40–50%; 50–60%; 60–70%; Onyejiaka: 30–40%; 40–50%; 50–60%; 90–100%; Tie: 20–30%; 30–40%; 40–50%; 50%; No Votes

Democratic primary results
Party	Candidate	Votes	%
Democratic	Marquita Bradshaw	186,230	54.79%
Democratic	Maria Brewer	61,061	17.96%
Democratic	Kevin Lee McCants	34,234	10.07%
Democratic	Civil Miller-Watkins	29,596	8.71%
Democratic	Diana Onyejiaka	28,805	8.47%
Total votes		339,926	100.00%

== Independents and third-party candidates ==
=== Candidates ===
==== Declared ====
- Tharon Chandler, candidate for U.S. Senate in 2024 and Democratic nominee for Tennessee's 7th congressional district in 2016
- Andrew Gerena, technician
- Jeremy Hearn
- Robert Jones, small business owner
- James Macon III
- Yoshi Matthews, nonprofit founder
- David Sutman Jr.
- Catherine Whitson
- Andrew Woodruff Mixon, former Honorary Mayor of Hampton (2025) (Federalist Party)

== General election ==
=== Predictions ===
Source	Ranking	As of
The Cook Political Report	Solid R	November 2, 2026
Decision Desk HQ	Safe R	November 3, 2026
The Economist (Note: The Economist's prediction model uses unconventional terminology. For the purpose of equivalency, their "Very Likely" ratings are formatted as a "Likely" rating while "Likely" ratings are formatted as a "Lean" rating.)	Safe R	November 3, 2026
FiftyPlusOne	Safe R	November 3, 2026
Fox News	Solid R	November 1, 2026
Inside Elections	Solid R	October 29, 2026
MS NOW	Safe R	October 29, 2026
NBC News	Solid R	November 3, 2026
RealClearPolitics	Solid R	November 2, 2026
Sabato's Crystal Ball	Safe R	November 2, 2026
Silver Bulletin	Solid R	November 3, 2026
Split Ticket	Safe R	November 2, 2026

=== Post-primary endorsements ===
Marquita Bradshaw (D)

Organizations

- National Women's Political Caucus

=== Fundraising ===
Campaign finance reports as of September 30, 2026
Candidate	Raised	Spent	Cash on hand
Bill Hagerty (R)	$17,226,961	$12,325,565	$4,956,455
Marquita Bradshaw (D)	$35,195	$27,022	$8,252
Source: Federal Election Commission

=== Polling ===
Poll source	Date(s) administered	Sample size (Note: Key: A – all adults RV – registered voters LV – likely voters V – unclear)	Margin of error	Bill Hagerty (R)	Marquita Bradshaw (D)	Other (Note: Calculated by taking the difference of 100% and all other candidates combined.)	Undecided
Targoz Market Research (Note: Poll sponsored by the Beacon Center of Tennessee)	October 24 – November 2, 2026	718 (LV)	± 3.58%	57%	37%	3% (Note: "Someone else" with 3%)	3%
Targoz Market Research	August 15–26, 2026	1,157 (RV)	± 2.77%	51%	31%	6% (Note: "An independent candidate" with 6%)	12%

=== Results ===
2026 United States Senate election in Tennessee
Party	Candidate	Votes	%	±%
Republican	Bill Hagerty (incumbent)	1,138,436	55.08%	−7.02%
Democratic	Marquita Bradshaw	886,974	42.91%	+7.75%
Independent	Robert Jones	9,398	0.46%	N/A
Independent	Tharon Chandler	7,689	0.37%	N/A
Independent	Andrew Gerena	5,633	0.27%	N/A
Independent	Catherine Barcel "Barcy" Whitson	5,113	0.25%	N/A
Independent	Jeremy Dean Hearn	4,937	0.24%	N/A
Independent	David Sutman, Jr.	3,087	0.15%	N/A
Independent	Yoshi D. Matthews	3,026	0.15%	N/A
Independent	James William Macon III	2,576	0.12%	N/A
Total votes		2,066,869	100.00%	
Republican hold				

==== By county ====
County	Bill Hagerty Republican		Marquita Bradshaw Democratic		Various candidates Other parties		Margin		Total
County	#	%	#	%	#	%	#	%	Total
Anderson									
Bedford									
Benton									
Bledsoe									
Blount									
Bradley									
Campbell									
Cannon									
Carroll									
Carter									
Cheatham									
Chester									
Claiborne									
Clay									
Cocke									
Coffee									
Crockett									
Cumberland									
Davidson									
Decatur									
DeKalb									
Dickson									
Dyer									
Fayette									
Fentress									
Franklin									
Gibson									
Giles									
Grainger									
Greene									
Grundy									
Hamblen									
Hamilton									
Hancock									
Hardeman									
Hardin									
Hawkins									
Haywood									
Henderson									
Henry									
Hickman									
Houston									
Humphreys									
Jackson									
Jefferson									
Johnson									
Knox									
Lake									
Lauderdale									
Lawrence									
Lewis									
Lincoln									
Loudon									
Macon									
Madison									
Marion									
Marshall									
Maury									
McMinn									
McNairy									
Meigs									
Monroe									
Montgomery									
Moore									
Morgan									
Obion									
Overton									
Perry									
Pickett									
Polk									
Putnam									
Rhea									
Roane									
Robertson									
Rutherford									
Scott									
Sequatchie									
Sevier									
Shelby									
Smith									
Stewart									
Sullivan									
Sumner									
Tipton									
Trousdale									
Unicoi									
Union									
Van Buren									
Warren									
Washington									
Wayne									
Weakley									
White									
Williamson									
Wilson									
Totals									

Counties that flipped from Republican to Democratic

- Montgomery (largest city: Clarksville)
- Hamilton (largest city: Chattanooga)
- Rutherford (largest city: Murfreesboro)

== See also ==
- Elections in Tennessee
- Political party strength in Tennessee
- Tennessee Democratic Party
- Tennessee Republican Party
- Government of Tennessee
- 2026 Tennessee gubernatorial election
- 2026 Tennessee elections
- 2026 United States elections
- 2026 Tennessee redistricting

== Notes ==
Partisan clients
