= 2026 Tennessee elections =

Tennessee state elections in 2026 were held on Tuesday, November 3, 2026. Primary elections for the United States Senate, United States House of Representatives, governorship, Tennessee Senate, Tennessee House of Representatives, as well as general local elections took place on August 6. There were also a number of judicial retention elections, including two for Tennessee Supreme Court justices Mary L. Wagner and Kyle Hixson. Three constitutional amendments to the Constitution of Tennessee were also approved.

Attempts to close the state's primary elections during the 114th session of the Tennessee General Assembly were defeated, leaving the state's primaries open for the 2026 election cycle. Voting rights organization Organize Tennessee documented 153 incidents of ballot distribution errors, voter misinformation and intimidation, and presence of uniformed law enforcement and candidate presence at polling locations during the August 2026 primaries.

== Election schedule ==
- March 10: Candidate petitioning deadline
- March 17: Candidate withdrawal deadline
- August 6: Primary election day
  - July 7: Voter registration deadline
  - May 8 – July 27: Absentee postal voting available
  - July 17 – August 1: Early in-person voting available
- November 3: General election day
  - October 5: Voter registration deadline
  - August 5 – October 24: Absentee mail voting available
  - October 14 – 29: Early in-person voting available

== United States Congress ==
=== Senate ===
One-term Republican Bill Hagerty was elected in 2020 with 62.2% of the vote. He was re-elected with 55.1% of the vote, over activist Marquita Bradshaw.

=== House of Representatives ===
Tennessee elected nine U.S. Representatives, each representing one of Tennessee's nine congressional districts.

On May 6, 2026, Tennessee Republicans released a newly proposed congressional map that would draw out Rep. Steve Cohen (D-TN) of Memphis, intending to shift the state's delegation from an 8–1 Republican majority to a 9–0 Republican majority. The map passed both chambers and was signed into law by governor Bill Lee on May 7. The enactment of the new map extended the congressional filing deadline to May 15. The newly drawn 9th district did flip Republican, as state senator Brent Taylor defeated Democratic state representative Justin Pearson to succeed Cohen, but incumbent Republican representative Scott DesJarlais of the 4th district was narrowly upset by Democrat Victoria Broderick, keeping the delegation's party makeup unchanged.

== Gubernatorial ==
Incumbent Republican Governor Bill Lee is prohibited by the Constitution of Tennessee from seeking a third consecutive term. Republican U.S. Senator Marsha Blackburn was elected to succeed him, over Democratic Memphis City Council member Jerri Green.

== State legislature ==
=== State Senate ===
Republicans maintained their 27–6 majority in the Tennessee Senate.

=== State House of Representatives ===
The Republican majority in the Tennessee House of Representatives fell from 75–24 to 69–30. In the 93rd district, no candidate qualified for the ballot, including incumbent state representative G. A. Hardaway, who died in office in April. Democrat John Bradley won the subsequent write-in campaign.

== Ballot measures ==
Three constitution amendments were placed on the ballot:

- HOUSE JOINT RESOLUTION NO. 94 (113th) A RESOLUTION proposing an amendment to Article I, Section 35 of the Constitution of Tennessee, relative to the rights of crime victims. House Joint Resolution 94 calling for an amendment to the Constitution was passed by a majority of both houses of the 113th General Assembly. Before the proposed amendment may be submitted to a vote of the people on the November 2026 ballot, the amendment must be referred to and passed by two-thirds of the members of both houses of the 114th General Assembly.
- HOUSE JOINT RESOLUTION NO. 81 (113th) A RESOLUTION to propose an amendment to Article II, Section 28 of the Constitution of Tennessee, to prohibit taxation of property by the State. House Joint Resolution 81 calling for an amendment to the Constitution was passed by a majority of both houses of the 113th General Assembly. Before the proposed amendment may be submitted to a vote of the people on the November 2026 ballot, the amendment must be referred to and passed by two-thirds of the members of both houses of the 114th General Assembly.
- SENATE JOINT RESOLUTION NO. 919 (113th) A RESOLUTION to propose an amendment to Article I of the Constitution of Tennessee, relative to bail. Senate Joint Resolution 919 calling for an amendment to the Constitution was passed by a majority of both houses of the 113th General Assembly. Before the proposed amendment may be submitted to a vote of the people on the November 2026 ballot, the amendment must be referred to and passed by two-thirds of the members of both houses of the 114th General Assembly.

All three amendments were approved by voters.

== Supreme Court ==
There were two Supreme Court retention elections on August 6, 2026, for justices Mary L. Wagner, who was appointed by governor Bill Lee in 2024, and Kyle Hixson, who was appointed by Lee in January 2026. Both were retained.

== Local elections ==
=== County mayors ===
Elections were held on August 6, 2026, to determine the mayors of many counties in the state, including several of the most populous — Shelby, Knox, Hamilton, Rutherford, Montgomery, and Williamson.

=== Clarksville ===
Incumbent Democratic mayor Joe Pitts declined to seek re-election. Former Montgomery County Commissioner Mark Riggins narrowly defeated city council member and former mayor pro tempore Wanda Smith.

=== Murfreesboro ===
Incumbent Republican mayor Shane McFarland was re-elected.

== See also ==
- Elections in Tennessee
- Political party strength in Tennessee
- Tennessee Democratic Party
- Tennessee Republican Party
- Government of Tennessee
- Tennessee Supreme Court
- 2026 United States elections
- 2026 Tennessee redistricting
