= 2020 Tennessee elections =

Tennessee state elections in 2020 were held on Tuesday, November 3, 2020. Primary elections for the United States Senate, United States House of Representatives, Tennessee Senate, and Tennessee House of Representatives, as well as various judicial retention elections, were held on August 6, 2020.

== Presidential election ==
=== President of the United States ===
Final results by county: Trump: 50–60%; 60–70%; 70–80%; 80–90%; Biden: 50–60%; 60–70%

In 2020, Tennessee was a stronghold for the Republican Party, and was considered a reliable "red state." Tennessee had 11 electoral votes in the Electoral College at the time. In the general election, Incumbent United States President Donald Trump won Tennessee with 60.66% of the vote.

The presidential primaries were held on March 3, 2020. Donald Trump won the Republican primary in a landslide victory over former congressman Joe Walsh of Illinois and former governor Bill Weld of Massachusetts. Vice President Joe Biden garnered the Democratic nomination, beating out Bernie Sanders of Vermont.

=== Results ===
2020 United States presidential election in Tennessee
Party	Candidate	Votes	%	±%
Republican	Donald Trump Mike Pence	1,852,475	60.66	–0.06
Democratic	Joe Biden Kamala Harris	1,143,711	37.45	+2.73
Independent (Note: Jorgensen and Cohen were nominated by the Libertarian Party of Tennessee but placed on the ballot as independents because the party did not have ballot access.)	Jo Jorgensen Spike Cohen	29,877	0.98	–1.83
Independent	Kanye West Michelle Tidball	10,279	0.34	N/A
Independent (Note: Blankenship and Mohr were nominated by the Constitution Party of Tennessee but placed on the ballot as independents because the party did not have ballot access.)	Don Blankenship William Mohr	5,365	0.18	+0.12
Independent (Note: Hawkins and Walker were nominated by the Green Party of Tennessee but placed on the ballot as independents because the party did not have ballot access.)	Howie Hawkins Angela Walker	4,545	0.15	–0.49
Independent (Note: Kennedy and Jarrett were nominated by the Socialist Workers Party but placed on the ballot as independents because the party did not have ballot access.)	Alyson Kennedy Malcolm Jarrett	2,576	0.08	–0.04
Independent (Note: La Riva and Freeman were nominated by the Party for Socialism and Liberation but placed on the ballot as independents because the party did not have ballot access.)	Gloria La Riva Sunil Freeman	2,301	0.08%	N/A
Independent (Note: De La Fuente and Richardson were nominated by the Alliance Party but placed on the ballot as independents because the party did not have ballot access.)	Rocky De La Fuente Darcy Richardson	1,860	0.06	–0.10
American Solidarity	Brian T. Carroll (write-in) Amar Patel (write-in)	762	0.02	N/A
Independent	Jade Simmons (write-in) Claudeliah Roze (write-in)	68	0.00	N/A
Independent	Tom Hoefling (write-in) Andy Prior (write-in)	31	0.00%	N/A
Independent	R19 Boddie (write-in) Eric Stoneham (write-in)	1	0.00%	N/A
Independent	Kasey Wells (write-in) Rachel Wells (write-in)	0	0.00%	N/A
Total votes		3,053,851	100.00%	
Republican win				

March 3, 2020 primary results

Final results by county: Biden: 30–40% 40–50%; 50–60%; 60–70%; Sanders: 30–40%

2020 Tennessee Democratic presidential primary
Candidate	Votes	%	Delegates
Joe Biden	215,390	41.72	36 (Note: 33 delegates, if Bloomberg's statewide delegates would have been calculated.)
Bernie Sanders	129,168	25.02	22 (Note: 20 delegates, if Bloomberg's statewide delegates would have been calculated.)
Michael Bloomberg	79,789	15.46	5 (Note: 10 delegates, if Bloomberg's statewide delegates would have been calculated.)
Elizabeth Warren	53,732	10.41	1
Pete Buttigieg (withdrawn) (Note: Candidate withdrew shortly before the primary, after early voting started.)	17,102	3.31	
Amy Klobuchar (withdrawn)	10,671	2.07	
Tulsi Gabbard	2,278	0.44	
Tom Steyer (withdrawn)	1,932	0.37	
Michael Bennet (withdrawn)	1,650	0.32	
Andrew Yang (withdrawn)	1,097	0.21	
Cory Booker (withdrawn)	953	0.18	
Marianne Williamson (withdrawn)	498	0.10	
John Delaney (withdrawn)	378	0.07	
Julian Castro (withdrawn)	239	0.05	
Deval Patrick (withdrawn)	182	0.04	
Uncommitted	1,191	0.23	
Total	516,250	100%	64

Final results by county: Trump: >90%

2020 Tennessee Republican primary
Candidate	Votes	%	Estimated delegates
Donald Trump	384,266	96.47	58
Joe Walsh (withdrawn)	4,178	1.05	0
Bill Weld	3,922	0.98	0
Uncommitted	5,948	1.49	0
Total	398,314	100%	58

== United States Congress ==
=== Senate ===
Final results by county: Hagerty: 80–90%; 70–80%; 60–70%; 50–60%; Bradshaw: 60–70%; 50–60%

Incumbent Republican Senator Lamar Alexander announced that he would not run for re-election on December 17, 2018. Environmentalist, activist and Democratic nominee Marquita Bradshaw, the first black woman to win a major political party nomination in any statewide race in Tennessee, was defeated by Republican nominee Bill Hagerty, former United States Ambassador to Japan and former Commissioner of the Tennessee Department of Economic and Community Development.

=== Results ===
2020 United States Senate election in Tennessee
Party	Candidate	Votes	%	±%
Republican	Bill Hagerty	1,840,926	62.20%	+0.33%
Democratic	Marquita Bradshaw	1,040,691	35.16%	+3.29%
Independent	Elizabeth McLeod	16,652	0.56%	N/A
Independent	Yomi Faparusi	10,727	0.36%	N/A
Independent	Stephen Hooper	9,609	0.32%	N/A
Independent	Kacey Morgan (withdrawn)	9,598	0.32%	N/A
Independent	Ronnie Henley	8,478	0.30%	N/A
Independent	Aaron James	7,203	0.29%	N/A
Independent	Eric William Stansberry	6,781	0.23%	N/A
Independent	Dean Hill	4,872	0.16%	N/A
Independent	Jeffrey Grunau	4,160	0.14%	N/A
Write-in		64	0.00%	±0.00%
Total votes		2,959,761	100.0%	
Republican hold				

August 6, 2020 primary results

Results by county: Bradshaw: Bradshaw—60–70%; Bradshaw—50–60%; Bradshaw—40–50%; Bradshaw—<40%; Mackler/Davis tie: Mackler/Davis tie—<40%; Kimbrough: Kimbrough—<40%; Mackler: Mackler—<40%; Mackler—<40–50%; Davis: Davis—<40%

Democratic primary results
Party	Candidate	Votes	%
Democratic	Marquita Bradshaw	117,962	35.51%
Democratic	Robin Kimbrough Hayes	88,492	26.64%
Democratic	James Mackler	78,966	23.77%
Democratic	Gary G. Davis	30,758	9.26%
Democratic	Mark Pickrell	16,045	4.83%
Total votes		332,223	100.00%

Results by county: Hagerty: Hagerty—70–80%; Hagerty—60–70%; Hagerty—50–60%; Hagerty—40–50%; Hagerty—<40%; Sethi: Sethi—40–50%; Sethi—50–60%

Republican primary results
Party	Candidate	Votes	%
Republican	Bill Hagerty	331,267	50.75%
Republican	Manny Sethi	257,223	39.41%
Republican	George Flinn, Jr.	22,454	3.44%
Republican	Jon Henry	8,104	1.24%
Republican	Natisha Brooks	8,072	1.24%
Republican	Byron Bush	5,420	0.83%
Republican	Clifford Adkins	5,316	0.81%
Republican	Terry Dicus	2,279	0.35%
Republican	Tom Emerson, Jr.	2,252	0.35%
Republican	David Schuster	2,045	0.31%
Republican	John Osborne	1,877	0.29%
Republican	Roy Dale Cope	1,791	0.27%
Republican	Kent Morrell	1,769	0.27%
Republican	Aaron Pettigrew	1,622	0.25%
Republican	Glen Neal, Jr.	1,233	0.19%
Total votes		652,724	100.00%

=== House of Representatives ===
District results: Republican: 70–80%; 60–70%; Democratic: >90%; 70–80%

Tennessee elected nine U.S. representatives, each representing one of Tennessee's nine congressional districts.

=== Results ===
District	Republican		Democratic		Others		Total		Result
District	Votes	%	Votes	%	Votes	%	Votes	%	Result
District 1	228,181	74.71%	68,617	22.47%	8,625	2.82%	305,423	100.0%	Republican hold
District 2	238,907	67.64%	109,684	31.06%	4,606	1.30%	353,197	100.0%	Republican hold
District 3	215,571	67.30%	97,687	30.50%	7,041	2.20%	320,299	100.0%	Republican hold
District 4	223,802	66.67%	111,908	33.33%	0	0.00%	335,710	100.0%	Republican hold
District 5	0	0.00%	252,155	99.99%	14	0.01%	252,169	100.0%	Democratic hold
District 6	257,572	73.68%	83,852	23.99%	8,154	2.33%	349,578	100.0%	Republican hold
District 7	245,188	69.93%	95,839	27.33%	9,608	2.74%	350,635	100.0%	Republican hold
District 8	227,216	68.47%	97,890	29.50%	6,747	2.03%	331,853	100.0%	Republican hold
District 9	48,818	20.10%	187,905	77.37%	6,157	2.53%	242,880	100.0%	Democratic hold
Total	1,685,255	59.30%	1,105,537	38.90%	50,952	1.79%	2,841,744	100.0%	

Popular vote
Republican	59.30%
Democratic	38.90%
Other	1.79%

House seats
Republican	77.78%
Democratic	22.22%

== State legislature ==
=== State Senate ===

Results by senate districts

Winners:

Republican hold
Democratic hold
Democratic gain
No election

Elections for 16 of the 33 seats in Tennessee's State Senate were held on November 3, 2020. There was 1 open seat, and 15 incumbents that ran for re-election.

Summary of the November 3, 2020 Tennessee Senate election results
Party	Candidates	Votes		Seats				
Party	Candidates	No.	%	Before	Up	Won	After	+/–
Republican	15	939,727	71.41	28	15	14	27	▼1
Democratic	10	321,494	24.43	5	1	2	6	▲1
Independent	3	52,928	4.02	0	0	0	0	Steady
Write-in	2	1,777	0.14	0	0	0	0	Steady
Total		1,315,926	100	33	16	16	33	Steady

Popular vote
Republican	71.41%
Democratic	24.43%
Other	4.16%

Senate seats
Republican	81.82%
Democratic	18.18%

=== Close races ===
Two races were decided by a margin of under 10%:

District	Winner	Margin
District 10	Republican	6.32%
District 20	Democratic (gain)	3.52%

=== State House of Representatives ===

Results by State House districts

Winners:

Republican hold
Democratic hold
Democratic gain

The election of all 99 seats in the Tennessee House of Representatives occurred on November 3, 2020.

The Democratic Party retook the 90th district, where the incumbent John DeBerry had defected to become an independent. The Republican Party maintained their supermajority in the state house.

Summary of the November 3, 2020 Tennessee House election results
Party	Candidates	Votes		Seats	
Party	Candidates	No.	%	No.	+/–
Republican	79	1,740,193	67.24	73	Steady
Democratic	58 (+1 write-in)	800,069	30.92	26	▲1
Independent	8	46,611	1.80	0	▼1
Write-in		974	0.04	0	Steady
Total		2,587,847	100.00	99	Steady

Popular vote
Republican	67.24%
Democratic	30.92%
Independent	1.80%
Write-ins	0.04%

House seats
Republican	73.74%
Democratic	26.26%

=== Close races ===
Seven races were decided by a margin of under 10%:

District	Winner	Margin
District 97	Republican	1.6%
District 13	Democratic	5.8%
District 49	Republican	7.8%
District 83	Republican	8.0%
District 56	Democratic	8.4%
District 18	Republican	9.8%
District 67	Democratic	9.8%

== See also ==
- Elections in Tennessee
- Political party strength in Tennessee
- Tennessee Democratic Party
- Tennessee Republican Party
- Government of Tennessee
- 2020 United States elections
