= 2024 United States Senate election in Tennessee =

- November 5, 2024
- Turnout: 64.04% ▲9.58 pp
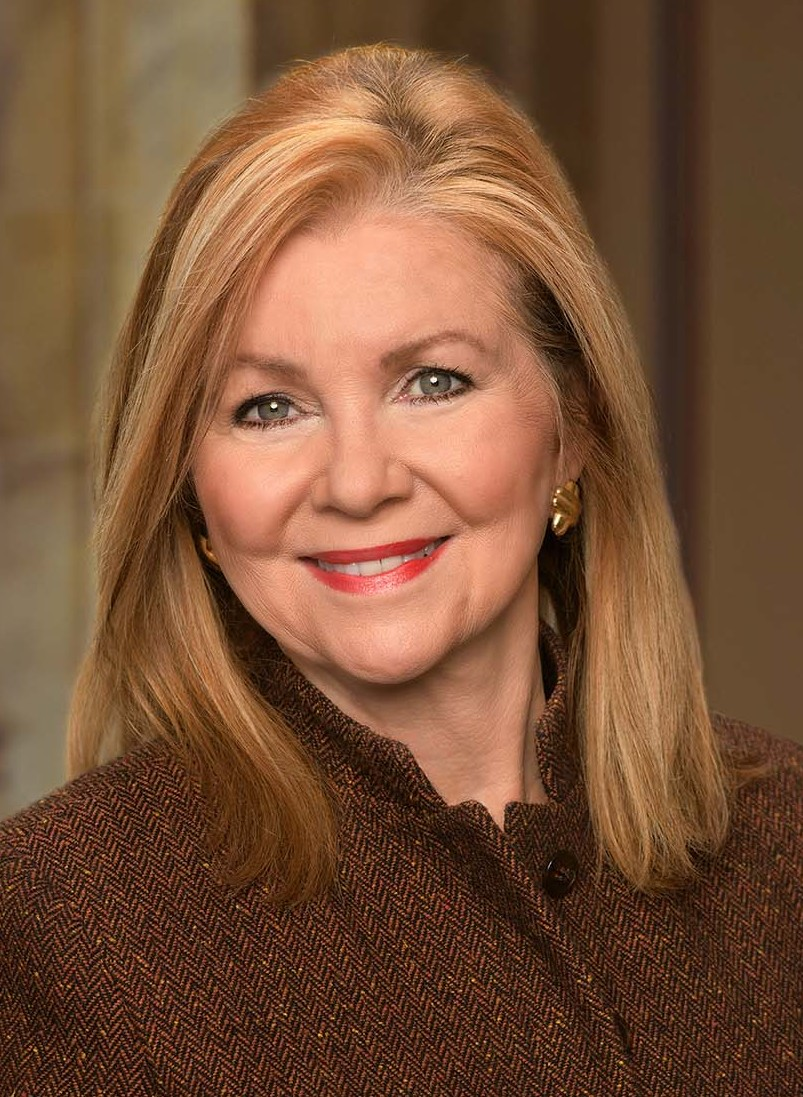

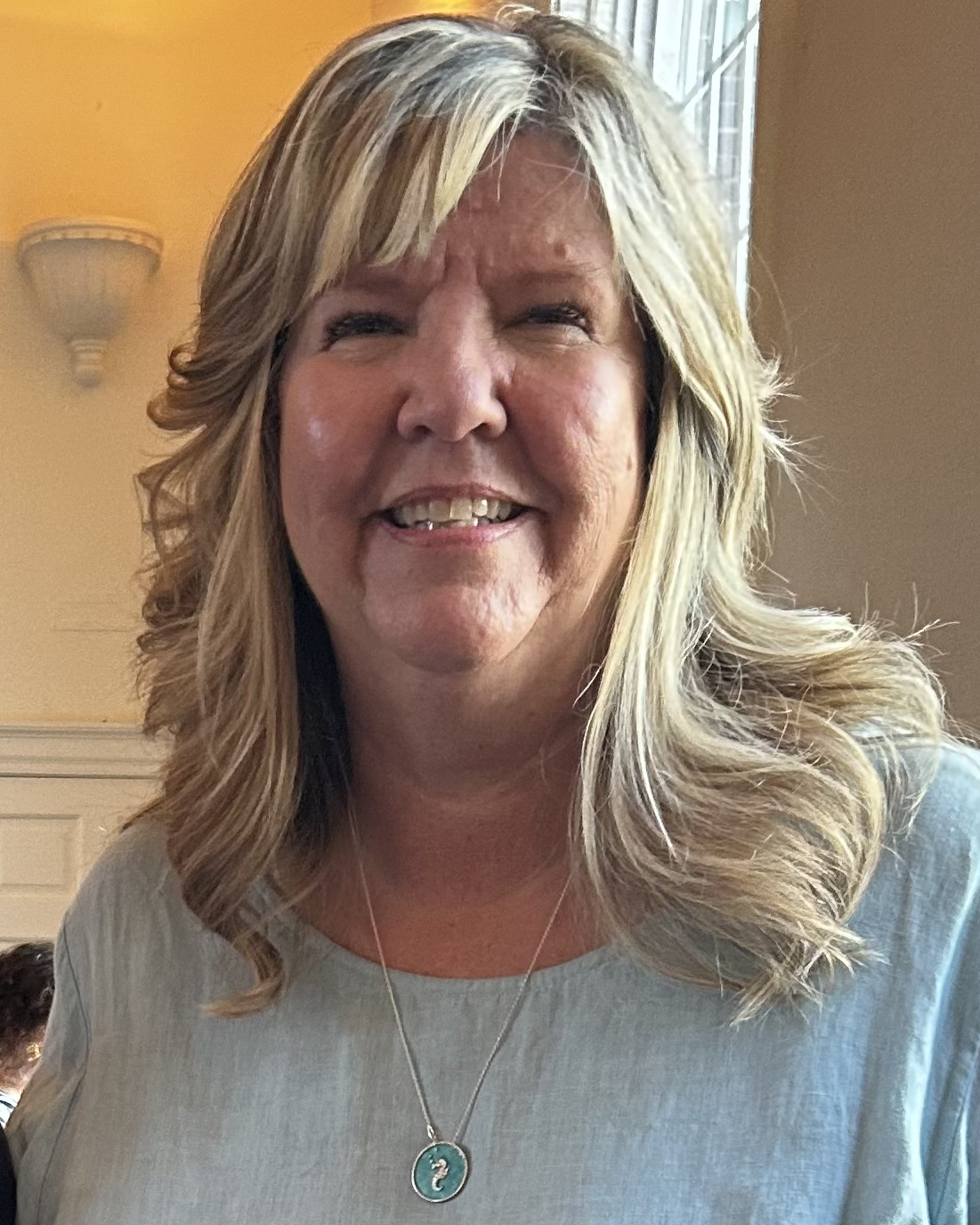
Nominee	Marsha Blackburn	Gloria Johnson
Party	Republican	Democratic
Popular vote	1,918,743	1,027,461
Percentage	63.80%	34.16%
- Blackburn: 40–50% 50–60% 60–70% 70–80% 80–90% >90% Johnson: 40–50% 50–60% 60–70% 70–80% 80–90% >90% Tie: 50% No data
U.S. senator before election
Marsha Blackburn
Republican
Elected U.S. senator
Marsha Blackburn
Republican

The 2024 United States Senate election in Tennessee was held on November 5, 2024, to elect a member of the United States Senate to represent the state of Tennessee. Incumbent one-term Republican Senator Marsha Blackburn defeated state representative Gloria Johnson with 63.8% of the vote. Blackburn improved vastly from her 2018 performance by nearly 19 points.

The primaries took place on August 1, 2024, with Blackburn and Johnson winning their respective party nominations. This was the first general election for a Tennessee senate seat in which the two major party candidates were women.

Blackburn performed comparably to Donald Trump in the general election overall but notably outperformed him in some key counties. Specifically, she outperformed him in Hamilton, Madison, and Shelby. She also outperformed Trump in Haywood County—a county he lost and where she had also previously lost—but this time, she managed to flip it. Johnson lost her home county, Knox County, by a wide margin.

Although Johnson campaigned for the Senate seat, she simultaneously sought and won re-election unopposed to the State House in the 90th district. Blackburn would then go on to successfully run and be elected governor in the 2026 elections instead of completing her second term in the Senate.

== Background ==
At the federal and state levels, Tennessee is considered to be a strongly red state, having gone to Donald Trump by 23 points in the 2020 presidential election. In Tennessee, Republicans occupied both Senate seats, 8 out of 9 U.S. House seats, supermajorities in both state legislative chambers, and the governor's office.

Due to Tennessee's strong conservative bent, this race was considered a "Safe" Republican hold.

=== Campaign ===
After defeating Former Governor Phil Bredesen by a surprisingly wide margin in 2018, Blackburn sought re-election. She was easily re-nominated as the Republican nominee.

Initially, 2020 Democratic nominee for senate, Marquita Bradshaw was seen as the early favorite but months after her announcement, State Representative Gloria Johnson entered the race. Johnson had gained prominence for her protest on the Tennessee house floor over the 2023 Covenant School shooting. Of the three representatives involved in the protest, two were expelled from the legislature, while Johnson narrowly avoided expulsion by just one vote. Johnson would go on to easily win the nomination.

Throughout the campaign, Blackburn consistently led Johnson in the polls and enjoyed a significant financial edge, with a $9 million fundraising advantage. On October 16, the two candidates were scheduled to debate, but Blackburn declined to attend, leaving Johnson to face an empty chair.

== Republican primary ==
=== Candidates ===
==== Nominee ====
- Marsha Blackburn, incumbent U.S. Senator (2019–present)

==== Eliminated in primary ====
- Tres Wittum, legislative policy analyst and candidate for Tennessee's 5th congressional district in 2022

==== Endorsements ====
Marsha Blackburn

U.S. Executive Branch officials

- Donald Trump, former president of the United States

Organizations

- American Israel Public Affairs Committee (AIPAC)
- Maggie's List
- Turning Point Action

=== Fundraising ===
Campaign finance reports as of July 12, 2024
Candidate	Raised	Spent	Cash on hand
Marsha Blackburn (R)	$14,501,964	$6,339,437	$8,776,627
Source: Federal Election Commission

=== Results ===
Results by county: Blackburn: 80–90%; >90%

Republican primary results
Party	Candidate	Votes	%
Republican	Marsha Blackburn (incumbent)	367,799	89.48%
Republican	Tres Wittum	43,244	10.52%
Write-in		2	<0.01%
Total votes		411,045	100.00%

== Democratic primary ==
=== Candidates ===
==== Nominee ====
- Gloria Johnson, state representative from the 90th district (2013–2015, 2019–present)

==== Eliminated in primary ====
- Marquita Bradshaw, staffing consultant and nominee for U.S. Senate in 2020
- Lola Brown, minister
- Civil Miller-Watkins, former Fayette County school board member

==== Declined ====
- Joanne Sowell, attorney

==== Endorsements ====
Gloria Johnson

Individuals

- Ruby Amanfu, musician
- Kyshona Armstrong, musician
- Sam Ashworth, musician
- Mya Byrne, musician
- Brandi Carlile, musician
- Beth Nielsen Chapman, musician
- Shelly Colvin, musician
- Elizabeth Cook, musician
- Brooke Eden, musician
- Kam Franklin, musician
- Mary Gauthier, musician
- Devon Gilfillian, musician
- Emmylou Harris, musician
- Brittany Howard, musician
- Meghan Linsey, musician
- Paul McDonald, musician
- Erin Rae McKaskle, musician
- Morgxn, musician
- Maren Morris, musician
- Katie Pruitt, musician
- Allison Russell, musician
- Amanda Shires, musician
- Lucie Silvas, musician
- Langhorne Slim, musician
- Brittney Spencer, musician
- Lilly Winwood, musician

Organizations

- Feminist Majority PAC
- National Organization for Women

Labor unions

- National Education Association

=== Fundraising ===
Campaign finance reports as of July 12, 2024
Candidate	Raised	Spent	Cash on hand
Marquita Bradshaw (D)	$36,054	$35,691	$364
Gloria Johnson (D)	$5,046,183	$3,009,194	$2,048,985
Source: Federal Election Commission

=== Polling ===
Poll source	Date(s) administered	Sample size (Note: Key: A – all adults RV – registered voters LV – likely voters V – unclear)	Margin of error	Marquita Bradshaw	Gloria Johnson	Civil Miller-Watkins	Other	Undecided
Targoz Market Research (Note: Poll sponsored by the Beacon Center of Tennessee)	March 15 – April 2, 2024	282 (LV)	± 2.77%	7%	38%	2%	1%	52%
Targoz Market Research	December 14–28, 2023	251 (LV)	± 2.66%	11%	41%	2%	1%	45%

=== Results ===
Results by county: Johnson: 40–50%; 50–60%; 60–70%; 70–80%; 80–90%; >90%; Miller-Watkins: 40–50%

Democratic primary results
Party	Candidate	Votes	%
Democratic	Gloria Johnson	143,962	70.20%
Democratic	Marquita Bradshaw	44,657	21.78%
Democratic	Lola Brown	10,027	4.89%
Democratic	Civil Miller-Watkins	6,420	3.13%
Total votes		205,066	100.00%

== Independents ==
=== Candidates ===
==== Declared ====
- Tharon Chandler, farmer and Democratic nominee for Tennessee's 7th congressional district in 2016
- Pamela Moses, community activist and convicted felon
- Hastina Robinson, firefighter

== General election ==
=== Predictions ===
Source	Ranking	As of
The Cook Political Report	Solid R	November 9, 2023
Inside Elections	Solid R	November 9, 2023
Sabato's Crystal Ball	Safe R	November 9, 2023
Decision Desk HQ/The Hill	Safe R	June 8, 2024
Elections Daily	Safe R	May 4, 2023
CNalysis	Safe R	November 21, 2023
RealClearPolitics	Solid R	August 5, 2024
Split Ticket	Safe R	October 23, 2024
538	Solid R	October 23, 2024

=== Post-primary endorsements ===
Marsha Blackburn (R)

Individuals

- Vivek Ramaswamy, pharmaceutical executive and candidate for president in 2024

=== Fundraising ===
Campaign finance reports as of July 12, 2024
Candidate	Raised	Spent	Cash on hand
Marsha Blackburn (R)	$14,501,964	$6,339,437	$8,776,627
Gloria Johnson (D)	$5,069,008	$3,009,194	$2,048,985
Source: Federal Election Commission

=== Polling ===
Aggregate polls

Source of poll aggregation	Dates administered	Dates updated	Marsha Blackburn (R)	Gloria Johnson (D)	Undecided (Note: Calculated by taking the difference of 100% and all other candidates combined.)	Margin
538	through October 28, 2024	October 29, 2024	55.0%	35.7%	9.3%	Blackburn +19.3
RCP	October 1, 2023 - May 9, 2024	September 9, 2024	50.5%	33.0%	16.5%	Blackburn +17.5
TheHill/DDHQ	through October 28, 2024	October 29, 2024	59.4%	36.5%	4.1%	Blackburn +22.9%
Average			55.0%	35.1%	9.9%	Blackburn +19.9%

Poll source	Date(s) administered	Sample size	Margin of error	Marsha Blackburn (R)	Gloria Johnson (D)	Undecided
ActiVote	October 7–28, 2024	400 (LV)	± 4.9%	61%	39%	–
ActiVote	September 14 – October 18, 2024	400 (LV)	± 4.9%	61%	39%	–
Targoz Market Research	September 27 – October 8, 2024	1,159 (RV)	± 2.77%	52%	29%	18% (Note: Moses (I) with 4%; Chandler (I) with 2%)
Targoz Market Research	September 27 – October 8, 2024	971 (LV)	± 2.77%	54%	31%	15% (Note: Moses (I) with 5%; Chandler (I) with 2%)
ActiVote	July 25 – September 2, 2024	400 (LV)	± 4.9%	60%	40%	–
Targoz Market Research	June 20 – July 1, 2024	1,124 (RV)	± 2.77%	49%	32%	19%
Targoz Market Research	June 20 – July 1, 2024	944 (LV)	± 2.77%	52%	32%	16%
SSRS/Vanderbilt University	April 26 – May 9, 2024	1,003 (RV)	± 3.4%	51%	40%	9%
Targoz Market Research	March 15 – April 2, 2024	955 (LV)	± 2.77%	45%	29%	26%
Targoz Market Research	October 5–16, 2023	850 (LV)	± 2.79%	49%	29%	23%

Hypothetical polling

Marsha Blackburn vs. Marquita Bradshaw

Poll source	Date(s) administered	Sample size	Margin of error	Marsha Blackburn (R)	Marquita Bradshaw (D)	Undecided
Targoz Market Research	June 20 – July 1, 2024	1,124 (RV)	± 2.77%	51%	33%	17%
Targoz Market Research	June 20 – July 1, 2024	942 (LV)	± 2.77%	54%	33%	14%
Targoz Market Research	March 15 – April 2, 2024	947 (LV)	± 2.77%	46%	22%	32%
Targoz Market Research	October 5–16, 2023	824 (LV)	± 2.79%	48%	36%	17%

=== Results ===
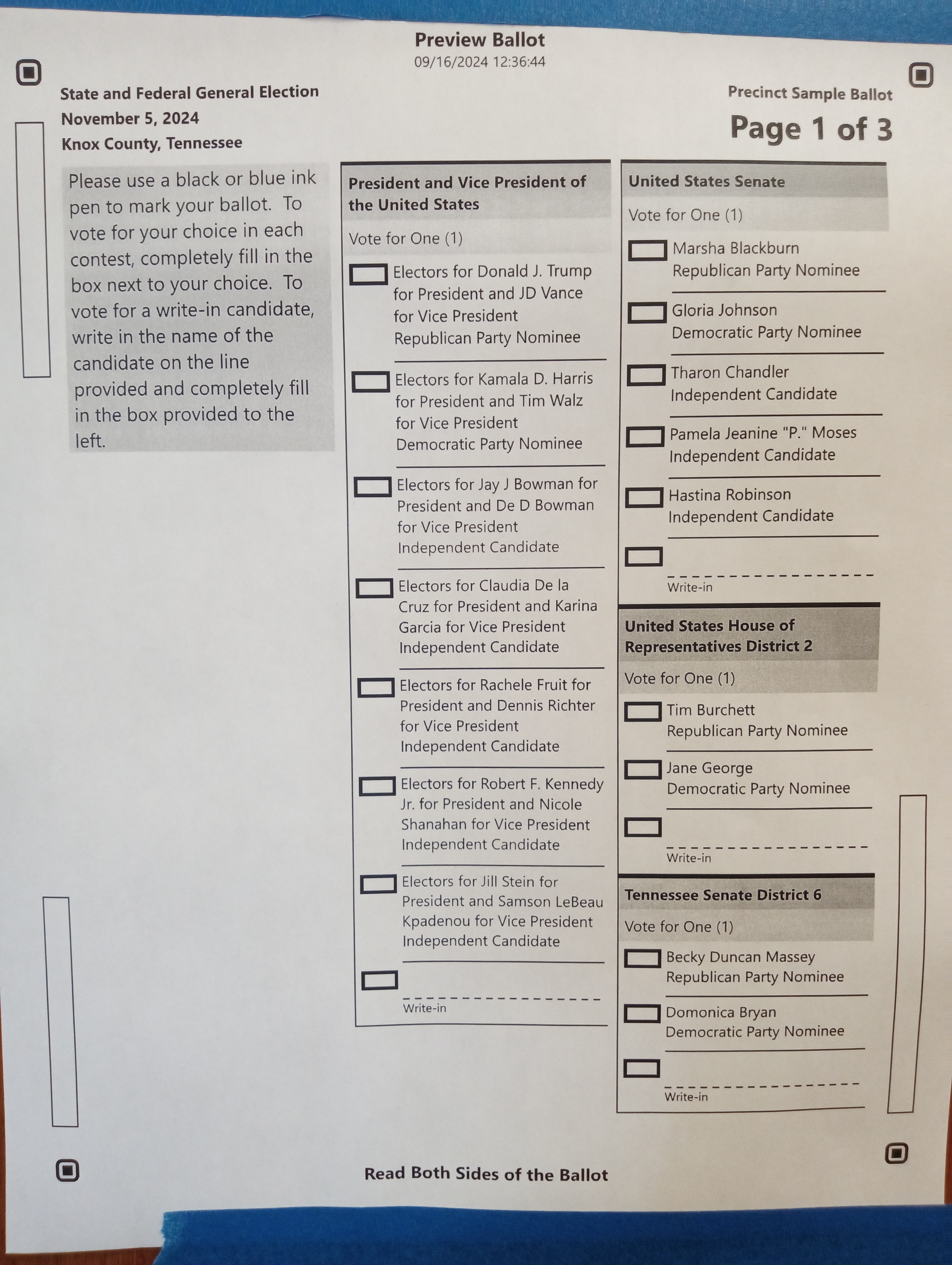
2024 Knoxville Ballot

2024 United States Senate election in Tennessee
Party	Candidate	Votes	%	±%
Republican	Marsha Blackburn (incumbent)	1,918,743	63.80%	+9.09%
Democratic	Gloria Johnson	1,027,461	34.16%	−9.76%
Independent	Tharon Chandler	28,444	0.95%	N/A
Independent	Pamela Moses	24,682	0.82%	N/A
Independent	Hastina Robinson	8,278	0.28%	N/A
Total votes		3,007,608	100.00%	

==== By county ====
County	Marsha Blackburn Republican		Gloria Johnson Democratic		Various candidates Other parties		Margin		Total
County	#	%	#	%	#	%	#	%	Total
Anderson	23,718	65.83%	11,587	32.16%	722	2.00%	12,131	33.67%	36,027
Bedford	15,098	77.11%	4,067	20.77%	415	2.12%	11,031	56.34%	19,580
Benton	5,653	79.73%	1,283	18.10%	154	2.17%	4,370	61.64%	7,090
Bledsoe	5,061	83.50%	897	14.80%	103	1.70%	4,164	68.70%	6,061
Blount	49,551	72.39%	17,632	25.76%	1,271	1.86%	31,919	46.63%	68,454
Bradley	37,622	78.14%	9,494	19.72%	1,029	2.14%	28,128	58.42%	48,145
Campbell	12,250	81.48%	2,495	16.60%	289	1.92%	9,755	64.88%	15,034
Cannon	5,308	80.31%	1,171	17.72%	130	1.97%	4,137	62.59%	6,609
Carroll	9,446	81.05%	2,017	17.31%	192	1.65%	7,429	63.74%	11,655
Carter	19,687	81.30%	4,081	16.85%	448	1.85%	15,606	64.45%	24,216
Cheatham	14,518	70.84%	5,563	27.14%	414	2.02%	8,955	43.70%	20,495
Chester	6,169	82.86%	1,135	15.25%	141	1.89%	5,034	67.61%	7,445
Claiborne	10,885	82.49%	2,118	16.05%	193	1.46%	8,767	66.44%	13,196
Clay	2,900	81.67%	593	16.70%	58	1.63%	2,307	64.97%	3,551
Cocke	12,471	81.92%	2,456	16.13%	296	1.94%	10,015	65.79%	15,223
Coffee	18,463	75.42%	5,428	22.17%	590	2.41%	13,035	53.25%	24,481
Crockett	4,530	78.95%	1,124	19.59%	84	1.46%	3,406	59.36%	5,738
Cumberland	26,427	78.38%	6,751	20.02%	540	1.60%	19,676	58.36%	33,718
Davidson	100,124	35.08%	179,312	62.83%	5,965	2.09%	-79,188	-27.75%	285,401
Decatur	4,410	82.93%	811	15.25%	97	1.82%	3,599	67.68%	5,318
DeKalb	7,137	78.99%	1,707	18.89%	191	2.11%	5,430	60.10%	9,035
Dickson	18,149	73.47%	5,967	24.16%	585	2.37%	12,182	49.31%	24,701
Dyer	11,050	79.73%	2,556	18.44%	253	1.83%	8,494	61.29%	13,859
Fayette	16,600	71.92%	6,111	26.48%	370	1.60%	10,489	45.44%	23,081
Fentress	8,064	85.63%	1,188	12.62%	165	1.75%	6,876	73.01%	9,417
Franklin	14,437	74.90%	4,493	23.31%	344	1.78%	9,944	51.59%	19,274
Gibson	16,078	76.98%	4,386	21.00%	422	2.02%	11,692	55.98%	20,886
Giles	10,027	76.32%	2,844	21.65%	267	2.03%	7,183	54.67%	13,138
Grainger	9,226	84.57%	1,537	14.09%	146	1.34%	7,689	70.48%	10,909
Greene	25,157	82.32%	4,841	15.84%	561	1.84%	20,316	66.48%	30,559
Grundy	4,931	81.79%	960	15.92%	138	2.29%	3,971	65.87%	6,029
Hamblen	19,382	77.60%	5,225	20.92%	370	1.48%	14,157	56.68%	24,977
Hamilton	97,475	56.31%	72,115	41.66%	3,527	2.04%	25,360	14.65%	173,117
Hancock	2,365	85.88%	343	12.45%	46	1.67%	2,022	73.43%	2,754
Hardeman	5,731	62.83%	3,204	35.13%	186	2.04%	2,527	27.70%	9,121
Hardin	9,945	84.83%	1,572	13.41%	207	1.77%	8,373	71.42%	11,724
Hawkins	21,209	83.50%	3,715	14.63%	475	1.87%	17,494	68.87%	25,399
Haywood	3,269	50.21%	3,122	47.95%	120	1.84%	147	2.26%	6,511
Henderson	9,994	84.12%	1,704	14.34%	182	1.53%	8,290	69.78%	11,880
Henry	11,048	76.62%	3,085	21.40%	286	1.98%	7,963	55.22%	14,419
Hickman	8,055	78.99%	1,947	19.09%	195	1.91%	6,108	59.90%	10,197
Houston	2,814	76.38%	801	21.74%	69	1.87%	2,013	54.64%	3,684
Humphreys	6,153	75.79%	1,789	22.03%	177	2.18%	4,364	53.76%	8,119
Jackson	4,279	78.26%	1,093	19.99%	96	1.76%	3,186	58.27%	5,468
Jefferson	20,239	79.89%	4,666	18.42%	428	1.69%	15,573	61.47%	25,333
Johnson	6,666	84.93%	1,085	13.82%	98	1.25%	5,581	71.11%	7,849
Knox	129,275	58.35%	88,913	40.13%	3,373	1.52%	40,362	18.22%	221,561
Lake	1,414	77.27%	384	20.98%	32	1.75%	1,030	56.29%	1,830
Lauderdale	5,434	68.78%	2,311	29.25%	156	1.97%	3,123	39.53%	7,901
Lawrence	15,484	81.86%	2,933	15.51%	498	2.63%	12,551	66.35%	18,915
Lewis	4,613	80.24%	1,002	17.43%	134	2.33%	3,611	62.81%	5,749
Lincoln	12,744	81.62%	2,562	16.41%	307	1.97%	10,182	65.21%	15,613
Loudon	24,848	75.77%	7,428	22.65%	516	1.57%	17,420	53.12%	32,792
Macon	8,342	84.71%	1,321	13.41%	185	1.88%	7,021	71.30%	9,848
Madison	23,578	60.20%	14,807	37.81%	781	1.99%	8,771	22.39%	39,166
Marion	10,314	75.58%	3,042	22.29%	290	2.13%	7,272	53.29%	13,646
Marshall	11,916	76.40%	3,391	21.74%	289	1.85%	8,525	54.66%	15,596
Maury	36,665	71.02%	14,008	27.14%	950	1.84%	22,657	43.88%	51,623
McMinn	18,934	80.09%	4,205	17.79%	503	2.13%	14,729	62.30%	23,642
McNairy	9,155	83.23%	1,680	15.27%	165	1.50%	7,475	67.96%	11,000
Meigs	4,810	81.47%	985	16.68%	109	1.85%	3,825	64.79%	5,904
Monroe	17,759	81.08%	3,694	16.87%	449	2.05%	14,065	64.21%	21,902
Montgomery	46,104	58.36%	30,669	38.82%	2,230	2.82%	15,435	19.54%	79,003
Moore	2,954	82.38%	545	15.20%	87	2.43%	2,409	67.18%	3,586
Morgan	7,090	84.03%	1,215	14.40%	132	1.56%	5,875	69.63%	8,437
Obion	10,378	82.38%	2,041	16.20%	179	1.42%	8,337	66.18%	12,598
Overton	8,413	79.41%	1,970	18.60%	211	1.99%	6,443	60.81%	10,594
Perry	2,906	82.09%	569	16.07%	65	1.84%	2,337	66.02%	3,540
Pickett	2,306	79.99%	513	17.79%	63	2.19%	1,793	62.20%	2,882
Polk	7,041	81.86%	1,429	16.61%	131	1.52%	5,612	65.25%	8,601
Putnam	24,520	71.76%	8,960	26.22%	688	2.01%	15,560	45.54%	34,168
Rhea	11,553	81.77%	2,284	16.17%	292	2.07%	9,269	65.60%	14,129
Roane	20,207	74.89%	6,255	23.18%	520	1.93%	13,952	51.71%	26,982
Robertson	25,146	73.32%	8,322	24.27%	826	2.41%	16,824	49.05%	34,294
Rutherford	86,026	59.28%	55,605	38.32%	3,482	2.40%	30,421	20.96%	145,113
Scott	7,924	86.64%	1,062	11.61%	160	1.75%	6,862	75.03%	9,146
Sequatchie	6,253	81.32%	1,275	16.58%	161	2.09%	4,978	64.74%	7,689
Sevier	34,101	78.81%	8,399	19.41%	770	1.78%	25,702	59.40%	43,270
Shelby	120,568	37.78%	189,954	59.53%	8,572	2.69%	-69,386	-21.75%	319,094
Smith	7,255	80.54%	1,576	17.50%	177	1.96%	5,679	63.04%	9,008
Stewart	5,201	80.70%	1,101	17.08%	143	2.22%	4,100	63.62%	6,445
Sullivan	57,989	77.42%	15,646	20.89%	1,267	1.69%	42,343	56.53%	74,902
Sumner	66,413	69.49%	27,119	28.38%	2,040	2.13%	39,294	41.11%	95,572
Tipton	19,625	75.47%	5,839	22.46%	539	2.07%	13,786	53.01%	26,003
Trousdale	3,079	76.78%	842	21.00%	89	2.22%	2,237	55.78%	4,010
Unicoi	6,754	81.25%	1,403	16.88%	156	1.88%	5,351	64.37%	8,313
Union	6,834	82.55%	1,315	15.88%	130	1.57%	5,519	66.67%	8,279
Van Buren	2,533	80.57%	532	16.92%	79	2.51%	2,001	63.65%	3,144
Warren	12,287	75.25%	3,648	22.34%	394	2.41%	8,639	52.91%	16,329
Washington	42,160	69.99%	16,872	28.01%	1,205	2.00%	25,288	41.98%	60,237
Wayne	5,690	86.67%	755	11.50%	120	1.83%	4,935	75.17%	6,565
Weakley	10,375	79.16%	2,494	19.03%	238	1.82%	7,881	60.13%	13,107
White	10,316	81.00%	2,174	17.07%	246	1.93%	8,142	63.93%	12,736
Williamson	94,791	65.77%	46,785	32.46%	2,558	1.77%	48,006	33.31%	144,134
Wilson	54,895	68.51%	23,556	29.40%	1,681	2.10%	31,339	39.11%	80,132
Totals	1,918,743	63.80%	1,027,461	34.16%	61,404	2.04%	891,282	29.64%	3,007,608

Counties that flipped from Democratic to Republican

- Haywood (largest city: Brownsville)

==== By congressional district ====
Blackburn won eight of nine congressional districts.

District	Blackburn	Johnson	Representative
1st	78.18%	20.04%	Diana Harshbarger
2nd	65.34%	33.07%	Tim Burchett
3rd	66.70%	31.28%	Chuck Fleischmann
4th	69.93%	27.80%	Scott DesJarlais
5th	57.94%	40.13%	Andy Ogles
6th	65.61%	32.35%	John W. Rose
7th	59.82%	37.92%	Mark E. Green
8th	70.89%	27.29%	David Kustoff
9th	29.00%	67.97%	Steve Cohen

== See also ==
- Elections in Tennessee
- Political party strength in Tennessee
- Tennessee Democratic Party
- Tennessee Republican Party
- Government of Tennessee
- 2024 United States presidential election in Tennessee
- 2024 Tennessee elections
- 2024 United States elections

== Notes ==
Partisan clients
