= Daisha McBride =

American singer-songwriter

- Also known as: The Rap Girl
- Born: January 2, 1996 (age 30); Knoxville, Tennessee, US
- Genres: Hip Hop; R&B
- Occupations: Rapper; Singer-Songwriter
- Years active: 2012 - Present

Daisha McBride, also known as "The Rap Girl", is an American rapper and songwriter.

== Early life ==
Born January 2, 1996, McBride is from Knoxville, Tennessee. She was first introduced to music through church, where she would often sing in the choir, and play the violin and piano. Starting from the age of 10, she became introduced into the Hip-Hop/Rap scene when she wasn't able to give her father anything for Father's Day, instead, she delivered him with a Father's Day rap. She took Rap more seriously after somebody told her, "Your talent is God's gift to you and what you do with it is your gift back to God." McBride graduated from Harden Valley Academy in Knoxville, Tennessee in 2014.

== Career ==
McBride received the nickname "The Rap Girl" during high school, where she was known for freestyling in the lunch room. She reached internet fame through "freestyle" videos uploaded to YouTube in 2011, and Twitter, Instagram, and Vine videos recorded in her college dorm at Middle Tennessee State University around 2015. She's stated that some of her main inspirations are Nicki Minaj, Kehlani, and Missy Elliott.

In November 2024, McBride was listed as one of the top 10 fastest growing artists on TikTok after Crash Adams released a video of McBride freestyling a verse to "Hotel Party" on a street in downtown Los Angeles.

== Discography ==
=== Singles ===
Title	Year	Album
"Hawk Anthem"	2012	Non-Album Single
"Understand Me" (produced by MJ Nichols)	2016	Non-Album Single
"Mood" (produced by Big Bruno)	2017	"The Journey"
"Look Mom" (produced by Forever Suave)	2017	Non-Album Single
"Extra!" (produced by Bliss)	2018	Non-Album Single
"Money To Be Made" Daisha McBride feat. Evan Dupri (produced by Big Bruno)	2018	Non-Album Single
"No Strings Attached" (produced by Savier)	2018	Non-Album Single
“Cake Up” (produced by Thomas Gxlden)	2018	Non-Album Single
“Nothing Else" Daisha McBride feat. Mike Floss (produced by Big Bruno)	2018	Non-Album Single
"If You Really Knew Me" (produced by SCi-FY)	2019	"Wild"
"Nashville to L.A." (produced by Big Bruno)	2019	Non-Album Single
"Top of The World" (produced by Big Bruno & SCi-FY)	2020	Non-Album Single
"See You In The Dark" Daisha McBride feat. Justin Starling (produced by Big Bruno & SCi-FY)	2020	Non-Album Single
"Galapagos Freestyle" Daisha McBride feat. Byron Juane (produced by Big Bruno & SCi-FY)	2020	Non-Album Single
"Pump Fake" (produced by Big Bruno & SCi-FY)	2021	Non-Album Single
"Pump Fake" REMIX Daisha McBride feat. 24hrs (produced by Big Bruno & SCi-FY)	2021	Non-Album Single
"Adventure Time Freestyle" (produced by SCi-FY & AB Eastwood)	2021	Non-Album Single
"Nerve" (produced by Big Bruno & SCi-FY)	2021	"Let Me Get This Off My Chest"
"No Love" (produced by Big Bruno & SCi-FY)	2022	Non-Album Single
"Birthday" (produced by SCi-FY & Chase Akers)	2023	Non-Album Single

=== Albums & EPs ===
Title	Album/EP Details	Track listing
"The Come Up"	Released: July 5, 2015; Label: Self-Released (Independent); Format: Digital Download, Streaming; Type: EP	1. The Come Up; 2. Long Time Coming; 3. Summer Time feat. Mic O 4. Country; 5. The Industry
"The Journey"	Released: January 17, 2017; Label: Self-Released (Independent); Format: Digital Download, Streaming; Type: EP	1. Journey (produced by Big Bruno); 2. Nobody Knows (produced by Donato); 3. Mood (produced by Big Bruno); 4. 4th Quarter feat. Indasia (produced by The Cratez); 5. Outro (produced by The Cratez)
"Need These Storms"	Released: September 22, 2017; Label: Self-Released (Independent); Format: Digital Download, Streaming; Type: Album	1. Need These Storms; 2. Nothin'; 3. 9:28; 4. Crazy feat. Jess; 5. Say No More feat. Evan Dupri; 6. God Got Me; 7. Believed In Me; 8. How You Like Me Now
"Wild"	Released: May 10, 2019; Label: Self-Released (Independent); Format: Digital Download, Streaming; Type: Album	1. Intro (produced by Big Bruno); 2. Back Up (produced by SCi-FY & Payday); 3. No Talk (produced by Big Bruno); 4. Grow Up (produced by Big Bruno x SCi-FY); 5. I’m Sorry (produced by Big Bruno); 6. N/A ft. Mike Floss (produced by Big Bruno); 7. Dolla$ (produced by SCi-FY & Dro Demby); 8. Been That (produced by SCi-FY); 9. If You Really Knew Me (produced by SCi-FY); 10. Love Like That ft. Jess & Evan Dupri (produced by Big Bruno & SCi-FY); 11. Money Can’t Buy (produced by Big Bruno); 12. Ride Fr ft. Hardaway 1k (produced by Big Bruno x SCi-FY)
"Yafeelme"	Released: July 3, 2020; Label: Self-Released (Independent); Format: Digital Download, Streaming; Type: EP	1. Ballgame (produced by Big Bruno x SCi-FY); 2. Get Ugly ft. nobigdyl. (produced by SCi-FY); 3. What You Need (produced by Big Bruno x SCi-FY); 4. How Long (produced by SCi-FY); 5. 23 (Bonus Track) (produced by SCi-FY)
"Hail Of A Year"	Released: October 30, 2020; Label: Self-Released (Independent); Format: Digital Download, Streaming; Type: EP	1. 2020 Interlude (produced by SCi-FY); 2. On For The Night (produced by Big Bruno); 3. Black Queen (produced by SCi-FY)
"Let Me Get This Off My Chest"	Released: November 19, 2021; Label: Self-Released (Independent); Format: Digital Download, Streaming; Type: Album	1. Balance (produced by Big Bruno x SCi-FY); 2. Affection (produced by SCi-FY); 3. Ties; 4. Ur Free (produced by Big Bruno x SCi-FY); 5. Nerve (produced by Big Bruno x SCi-FY); 6. FWB (produced by SCi-FY); 7. Walk Away (produced by SCi-FY); 8. Space Interlude (produced by SCi-FY x Darren King); 9. Bounce Back (produced by SCi-FY); 10. Hot N' Ready Interlude; 11. Friends (produced by Big Bruno x SCi-FY); 12. Loyal (produced by SCi-FY)
"I Realized We're Better Apart"	Released: February 13, 2023; Label: Self-Released (Independent); Format: Digital Download, Streaming; Type: EP	1. Birds (produced by SCi-FY); 2. Need Me Anymore (produced by Big Bruno x SCi-FY)

=== Featured Singles ===
Title	Year	Album
"Dagger" Darren King ft. Daisha McBride & Wyn Starks	2021	Non-Album Single
"Hotel Party Freestyle" Crash Adams ft. Daisha McBride	2024	Non-Album Single
