= 2020 United States Senate election in Tennessee =

- November 3, 2020
- Turnout: 69.30% ▲33.33 pp
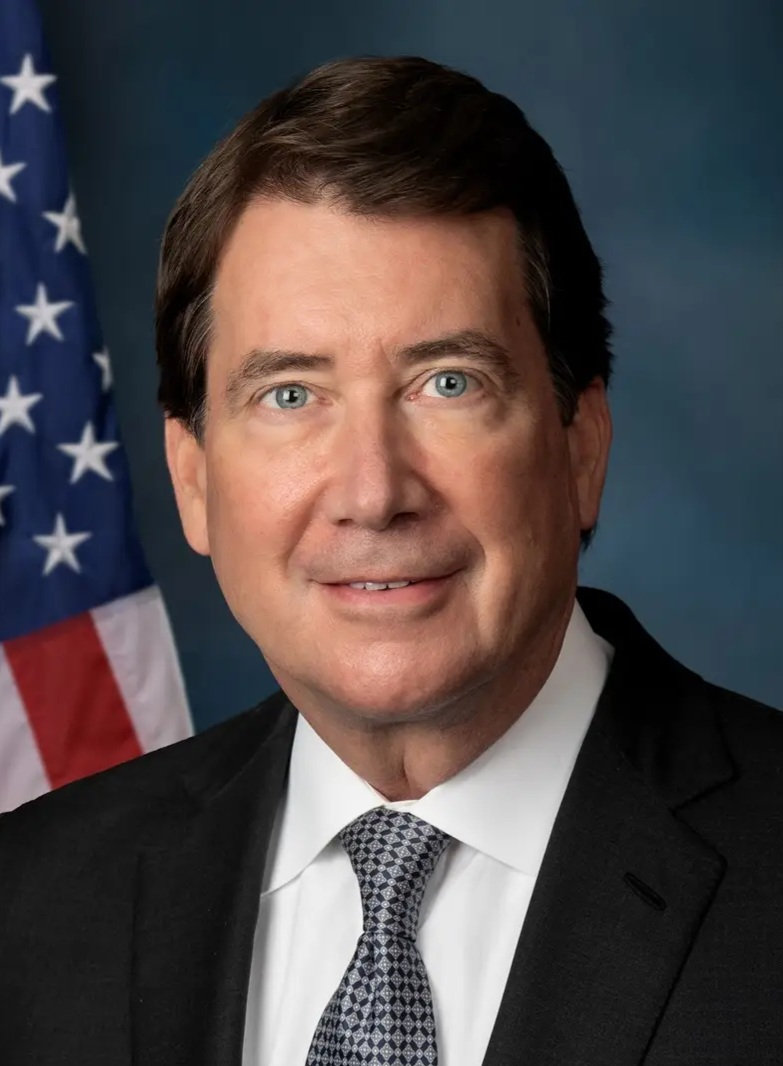

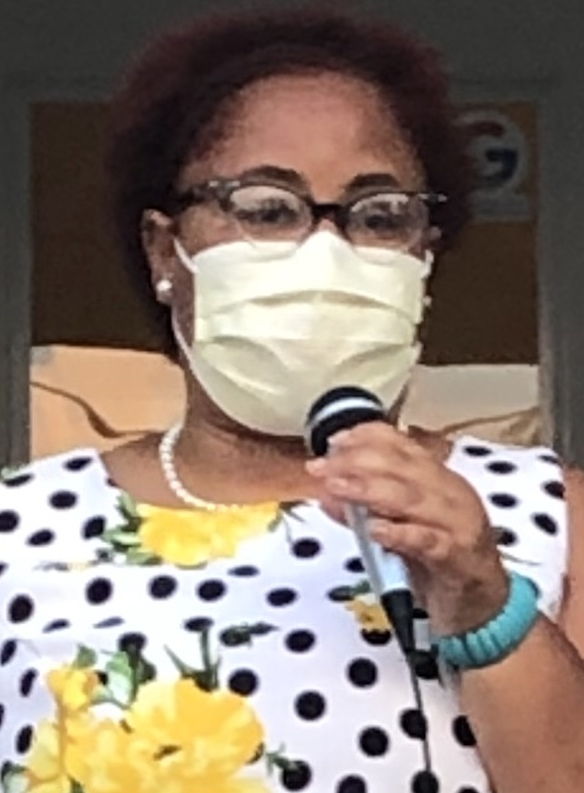
Nominee	Bill Hagerty	Marquita Bradshaw
Party	Republican	Democratic
Popular vote	1,840,926	1,040,691
Percentage	62.20%	35.16%
- Hagerty: 40–50% 50–60% 60–70% 70–80% 80–90% >90% Bradshaw: 40–50% 50–60% 60–70% 70–80% 80–90% >90% Tie: 40–50% 50% No data
U.S. senator before election
Lamar Alexander
Republican
Elected U.S. Senator
Bill Hagerty
Republican

The 2020 United States Senate election in Tennessee was held on November 3, 2020, concurrently with other elections to the United States Senate. The 2020 U.S. presidential election and elections to the U.S. House of Representatives were also held, as well as the State Senate and State House elections. Incumbent Republican Senator Lamar Alexander announced that he would not run for re-election on December 17, 2018. The former United States Ambassador to Japan, Bill Hagerty won the open seat by a large margin defeating his Democratic opponent Marquita Bradshaw.

In the primary, President Donald Trump endorsed Hagerty. He ended up winning the Republican nomination, defeating orthopedic surgeon Manny Sethi and 13 others in the Republican primary. In the Democratic primary, environmental activist Marquita Bradshaw from Memphis defeated Robin Kimbrough Hayes, as well as three other candidates. Nine independent candidates also appeared on the general election ballot.

Bill Hagerty outperformed Donald Trump by nearly four percentage points during the general election, a gap largely attributed to his stronger performance in suburban areas across Tennessee. Hagerty ran particularly well in the suburbs of Nashville, including Forest Hills, Belle Meade, Oak Hill, Franklin, Hendersonville, and Murfreesboro. He also exceeded Trump’s margins in suburban Memphis communities, most notably Germantown and Collierville as well as other surrounding suburbs. Bradshaw later ran for Tennessee's other U.S. Senate seat in 2024 and lost the Democratic primary.

== Republican primary ==
=== Candidates ===
==== Nominee ====
- Bill Hagerty, businessman, former United States Ambassador to Japan and former Commissioner of the Tennessee Department of Economic and Community Development

==== Eliminated in the primary ====
- Cliff Adkins
- Natisha Brooks
- Byron Bush, dentist
- Roy Dale Cope, small business owner and pharmacist
- Terry Dicus, attorney
- Tom Emerson Jr., Tea Party candidate for the U.S. Senate in 2014
- George Flinn Jr., former Shelby County commissioner, Nixon Administration Official, physician, engineer, businessman, and Republican candidate in Tennessee's 8th congressional district in 2016 and 2018
- Jon Henry, U.S. Marine Corps veteran
- Kent Morrell, business owner
- Glen Neal Jr., retired public servant
- John Osborne, real estate agent and business owner
- Aaron Pettigrew, truck driver
- David Schuster, U.S. Navy veteran
- Manny Sethi, orthopedic surgeon, director of the Vanderbilt Orthopedic Institute Center for Health Policy and founder and president of the non-profit Healthy Tennessee

==== Disqualified from the primary ballot ====
- Jim Elkins, Republican candidate for Tennessee's 3rd congressional district in 2020
- Johnny Presley, retired physician's assistant, hospital and clinic owner, farmer

==== Withdrawn ====
- Clyde Benson, army veteran and Republican candidate for District 39 of the Tennessee House of Representatives in 2016
- Larry Crim
- Josh Gapp, physician (unsuccessfully ran for TN-01)
- Garrett "Lance" Nichols
- Stokes Nielson, music industry executive and guitarist for the Lost Trailers

==== Declined ====
- Lamar Alexander, incumbent U.S. senator
- Mae Beavers, former state senator (endorsed Sethi)
- Diane Black, former U.S. representative for Tennessee's 6th congressional district and candidate for governor in 2018
- Randy Boyd, former Commissioner of the Tennessee Department of Economic and Community Development, candidate for governor in 2018, and President of the University of Tennessee system
- Bob Corker, former U.S. senator
- Stephen Fincher, former U.S. representative for Tennessee's 8th congressional district and candidate for U.S. Senate in 2018
- Chuck Fleischmann, U.S. representative for Tennessee's 3rd congressional district
- Mark E. Green, U.S. representative for Tennessee's 7th congressional district and former state senator
- Tre Hargett, Tennessee Secretary of State
- Beth Harwell, former Speaker of the Tennessee House of Representatives and candidate for governor in 2018
- Bill Haslam, former governor of Tennessee
- David Kustoff, U.S. representative for Tennessee's 8th congressional district and former U.S. Attorney
- Peyton Manning, retired NFL quarterback
- Jeff Webb, businessman (endorsed Sethi)

=== Endorsements ===
Bill Hagerty

Executive branch officials

- Donald Trump, President of the United States (2017–present)

U.S. senators

- Marsha Blackburn, Tennessee (2019–present)
- Tom Cotton, Arkansas (2015–present)
- Mitch McConnell, Kentucky (1985–present) and Senate Majority Leader (2015–present)

Statewide officials

- Jeb Bush, former Governor of Florida (1999–2007) and 2016 U.S. Presidential candidate
- Bill Haslam, former Governor of Tennessee (2011–2019) and Mayor of Knoxville

State legislators

- Patsy Hazlewood, state representative
- Curtis Johnson, Deputy Speaker of the Tennessee House of Representatives

Individuals

- Kellyanne Conway
- John Rich

Organizations

- Students For Trump
- Susan B. Anthony List Candidate Fund
- U.S. Chamber of Commerce
Manny Sethi

U.S. senators

- Ted Cruz, Texas (2013–present)
- Rand Paul, Kentucky (2011–presnet)

U.S. representatives

- Ed Bryant, former U.S. representative (TN-07) (1995–2003)
- John J. "Jimmy" Duncan Jr., former U.S. representative (TN-02) (1988–2019)
- Zach Wamp, former U.S. representative (TN-03) (1995–2011)

Statewide officials

- Winfield Dunn, businessman and former governor of Tennessee

State legislators

- Richard Briggs, state senator (Knoxville-07) and Colonel (Ret.) in the United States Army
- Joe S. Carr, former state representative (Lascassas-48)
- Dan Howell, state representative (Georgetown-22)
- Kelly Keisling, state representative (Byrdstown-38)
- James Peach, former state representative (Camden-74)
- Tony Shipley, former state representative (Kingsport-02)

=== Polling ===
Poll source	Date(s) administered	Sample size (Note: Key: A – all adults RV – registered voters LV – likely voters V – unclear)	Margin of error	George Flinn	Bill Hagerty	Manny Sethi	Other	Undecided
JMC Analytics and Polling	July 18–19, 2020	600 (LV)	± 4.0%	5%	36%	32%	9%	20%
The Trafalgar Group	July 6–8, 2020	1,062 (LV)	± 2.92%	4%	42%	39%	2%	13%
Victory Phones (Note: Poll conducted for the Sethi campaign.)	June 30 – July 1, 2020	800 (LV)	± 3.46%	6%	33%	31%	–	30%
The Tarrance Group (Note: Poll conducted for the Hagerty campaign.)	June 28–30, 2020	651 (LV)	± 4.0%	5%	46%	29%	2% (Note: "One of the other candidates" with 2%)	18%
Victory Phones	June 2, 2020	– (Note: Not yet released)	–	–	27%	11%	–	

Hypothetical polling

Mark Green vs. Bill Haslam
Poll source	Date(s) administered	Sample size	Margin of error	Mark Green	Bill Haslam	Undecided
Triton/Tennessee Star	April 13–16, 2019	1,003 (LV)	± 3.1%	30%	39%	≈30%

=== Results ===
Results by county: Hagerty: 30–40% 40–50%; 50–60%; 60–70%; 70–80%; Sethi: 40–50%; 50–60%

Republican primary results
Party	Candidate	Votes	%
Republican	Bill Hagerty	331,267	50.75%
Republican	Manny Sethi	257,223	39.41%
Republican	George Flinn, Jr.	22,454	3.44%
Republican	Jon Henry	8,104	1.24%
Republican	Natisha Brooks	8,072	1.24%
Republican	Byron Bush	5,420	0.83%
Republican	Clifford Adkins	5,316	0.81%
Republican	Terry Dicus	2,279	0.35%
Republican	Tom Emerson, Jr.	2,252	0.35%
Republican	David Schuster	2,045	0.31%
Republican	John Osborne	1,877	0.29%
Republican	Roy Dale Cope	1,791	0.27%
Republican	Kent Morrell	1,769	0.27%
Republican	Aaron Pettigrew	1,622	0.25%
Republican	Glen Neal, Jr.	1,233	0.19%
Total votes		652,724	100.00%

== Democratic primary ==
=== Candidates ===
==== Nominee ====
- Marquita Bradshaw, environmentalist

==== Eliminated in the primary ====
- Gary G. Davis, small business owner, baker, pilot, and perennial candidate
- Robin Kimbrough Hayes, attorney and Christian minister
- James Mackler, attorney, U.S. Army veteran and candidate for the U.S. Senate in 2018
- Mark Pickrell, entrepreneur, attorney and Baptist deacon

==== Disqualified from the primary ballot ====
- Tharon Chandler, journalist, economist, and conservationist

==== Withdrawn ====
- Diana C. Onyejiaka, college professor and consultant

==== Declined ====
- Andy Berke, incumbent mayor of Chattanooga and former state senator
- Phil Bredesen, former mayor of Nashville and Governor of Tennessee and nominee for U.S. Senate in 2018 (endorsed James Mackler)
- John Ray Clemmons, state representative and candidate for Mayor of Nashville in 2019
- Karl Dean, former mayor of Nashville and nominee for Governor of Tennessee in 2018
- Sara Kyle, incumbent state senator
- Tim McGraw, singer-songwriter
- Jason Powell, state representative, real estate agent, non-profit manager
- Madeline Rogero, former mayor of Knoxville
- Renata Soto, executive director of Conexión Américas
- Jeff Yarbro, minority leader of the Tennessee State Senate

=== Endorsements ===
James Mackler

Politicians

- Tim Kaine, U.S. senator, (VA)
- Phil Bredesen, former governor of Tennessee

Organizations

- DSCC
- End Citizens United
- Flip the Senate
- Giffords
- NARAL Pro-Choice America
- Planned Parenthood
- VoteVets
Marquita Bradshaw

Organizations

- Democratic Socialists of America

=== Results ===
Results by county: Bradshaw: 20–30%; 30–40%; 40–50%; 50–60%; Hayes: 20–30%; 30–40%; Mackler: 20–30%; 30–40%; 40–50%; Davis: 20–30%; 30–40%; Mackler/Davis tie: 20–30%

Democratic primary results
Party	Candidate	Votes	%
Democratic	Marquita Bradshaw	117,962	35.51%
Democratic	Robin Kimbrough Hayes	88,492	26.64%
Democratic	James Mackler	78,966	23.77%
Democratic	Gary G. Davis	30,758	9.26%
Democratic	Mark Pickrell	16,045	4.83%
Total votes		332,223	100.00%

== Independents ==
=== Declared ===
- Yomi Faparusi, physician, attorney, researcher, and former Republican candidate for Tennessee's 4th congressional district in 2014 and 2016
- Jeffrey Grunau, activist
- Ronnie Henley,
- Dean Hill, US veteran, former federal employee, and activist
- Steven Hooper
- Aaron James
- Elizabeth McLeod, conservative activist
- Eric William Stansberry

=== Withdrawn ===
- Tom Kovach, attorney
- Kacey Morgan, freelancer and operations director (endorsed Marquita Bradshaw) (remained on ballot)

== General election ==
=== Predictions ===
Source	Ranking	As of
The Cook Political Report	Safe R	October 29, 2020
Inside Elections	Safe R	October 28, 2020
Sabato's Crystal Ball	Safe R	November 2, 2020
Daily Kos	Safe R	November 30, 2020
Politico	Safe R	November 2, 2020
RCP	Likely R	October 23, 2020
DDHQ	Safe R	November 3, 2020
538	Safe R	November 2, 2020
Economist	Safe R	November 2, 2020

=== Post-primary endorsements ===
Bill Hagerty (R)

Federal officials

- Mitt Romney, U.S. senator from Utah, 2012 Republican presidential nominee, and former governor of Massachusetts

State officials

- Bo Watson, state senator

Local officials

- Roane County Commissioner Randy Ellis
- Sandy Still
- Cary Vaughn
Marquita Bradshaw (D)

Federal officials

- Joe Biden, 47th vice president of the United States (2009–2017), United States Senator from Delaware (1973–2009), Democratic nominee for the 2020 United States presidential election
- Ed Markey, U.S. senator from Massachusetts
- Ayanna Pressley, U.S. representative for Massachusetts's 7th congressional district
- Bernie Sanders, U.S. senator from Vermont and 2020 Democratic presidential primary candidate
- Elizabeth Warren, U.S. senator from Massachusetts and 2020 Democratic presidential primary candidate

Notable Individuals

- Charles Booker, candidate for 2020 United States Senate election in Kentucky
- Connie Britton, actress
- Kate Berlant, actress and comedienne
- Cori Bush, 2020 Democratic nominee for Missouri's 1st congressional district
- Pete Buttigieg, former mayor of South Bend, Indiana, and 2020 Democratic presidential candidate
- Vanessa Carlton, singer-songwriter
- Rosanne Cash, singer-songwriter
- Rodney Crowell, musician
- John Early, actor and comedian
- Johnny Knoxville, stunt performer and actor
- Lillie Mae, singer-songwriter
- Daisha McBride, rapper and songwriter
- John McCauley, singer-songwriter
- Margo Price, singer-songwriter
- Amy Schumer, actress and comedienne
- Sarah Silverman, actress and comedienne
- Nina Turner, former Ohio Senator
- William Tyler, musician
- Jaboukie Young-White, actor and comedian
- Bowen Yang, actor and comedian

Organizations

- Center for Biological Diversity
- Friends of the Earth Action
- National Women's Political Caucus
- Sierra Club
- Sunrise Movement
- Working Families Party

Unions

- Tennessee AFL-CIO

=== Polling ===
Poll source	Date(s) administered	Sample size	Margin of error	Bill Hagerty (R)	Marquita Bradshaw (D)	Other	Undecided
Swayable	October 23 – November 1, 2020	431 (LV)	± 6.2%	61%	39%	–	–
Cygnal	October 20–22, 2020	610 (LV)	± 3.97%	56%	36%	1% (Note: "Third-party candidate" with 1%)	7%

Hypothetical polling

with Bill Hagerty and James Mackler

Poll source	Date(s) administered	Sample size	Margin of error	Bill Hagerty (R)	James Mackler (D)	Undecided
Mason-Dixon	January 28–30, 2020	625 (RV)	± 4%	55%	33%	12%

with Manny Sethi and James Mackler

Poll source	Date(s) administered	Sample size	Margin of error	Manny Sethi (R)	James Mackler (D)	Undecided
Mason-Dixon	January 28–30, 2020	625 (RV)	± 4%	46%	35%	19%

with Generic Republican and Generic Democrat

Poll source	Date(s) administered	Sample size	Margin of error	Generic Republican	Generic Democrat	Undecided
Cygnal	October 20–22, 2020	610 (LV)	± 3.97%	58%	38%	4%
East Tennessee State University	April 22 – May 1, 2020	536 (LV)	–	43%	26%	31% (Note: "Does not matter" with 26%; unsure with 5%)

=== Results ===

2020 United States Senate election in Tennessee
Party	Candidate	Votes	%	±%
Republican	Bill Hagerty	1,840,926	62.20%	+0.33%
Democratic	Marquita Bradshaw	1,040,691	35.16%	+3.29%
Independent	Elizabeth McLeod	16,652	0.56%	N/A
Independent	Yomi Faparusi	10,727	0.36%	N/A
Independent	Stephen Hooper	9,609	0.32%	N/A
Independent	Kacey Morgan (withdrawn)	9,598	0.32%	N/A
Independent	Ronnie Henley	8,478	0.30%	N/A
Independent	Aaron James	7,203	0.29%	N/A
Independent	Eric William Stansberry	6,781	0.23%	N/A
Independent	Dean Hill	4,872	0.16%	N/A
Independent	Jeffrey Grunau	4,160	0.14%	N/A
Write-in		64	0.00%	±0.00%
Total votes		2,959,761	100.00%	
Republican hold				

==== By county ====
County	Bill Hagerty Republican		Marquita Bradshaw Democratic		Other votes		Total votes
County	%	#	%	#	%	#	Total votes
Anderson	66.54%	22,988	31.32%	10,820	2.14%	740	34,548
Bedford	76.68%	13,920	20.98%	3,808	2.34%	425	18,153
Benton	78.22%	5,462	19.16%	1,338	2.62%	183	6,983
Bledsoe	81.49%	4,460	16.41%	898	2.10%	115	5,473
Blount	73.27%	47,391	24.66%	15,950	2.07%	1,338	64,679
Bradley	77.62%	34,262	19.74%	8,716	2.64%	1,165	44,143
Campbell	82.53%	11,610	15.45%	2,173	2.02%	284	14,067
Cannon	79.61%	4,904	17.94%	1,105	2.45%	151	6,160
Carroll	77.78%	8,899	19.98%	2,286	2.24%	256	11,441
Carter	80.02%	18,593	17.76%	4,127	2.22%	514	23,234
Cheatham	72.19%	14,094	25.40%	4,959	2.41%	470	19,523
Chester	80.22%	5,951	17.59%	1,305	2.19%	162	7,418
Claiborne	82.26%	10,116	15.95%	1,962	1.79%	220	12,298
Clay	78.29%	2,525	19.10%	616	2.61%	84	3,225
Cocke	81.13%	11,284	16.01%	2,227	2.86%	397	13,908
Coffee	74.38%	17,607	22.03%	5,215	3.59%	849	23,671
Crockett	77.42%	4,455	20.68%	1,190	1.90%	109	5,754
Cumberland	78.97%	24,412	19.11%	5,908	1.92%	593	30,913
Davidson	35.20%	106,664	61.04%	184,972	3.76%	11,402	303,038
Decatur	80.87%	4,075	16.21%	817	2.92%	147	5,039
DeKalb	78.01%	6,162	19.29%	1,524	2.70%	213	7,899
Dickson	72.88%	17,214	23.52%	5,556	3.60%	851	23,621
Dyer	78.34%	11,237	19.06%	2,734	2.60%	372	14,343
Fayette	70.67%	15,414	26.67%	5,818	2.66%	579	21,811
Fentress	85.37%	7,066	12.78%	1,056	1.85%	155	8,277
Franklin	74.02%	13,490	24.06%	4,384	1.92%	350	18,224
Gibson	73.53%	15,583	22.97%	4,867	3.50%	742	21,192
Giles	74.70%	9,313	22.68%	2,828	2.62%	326	12,467
Grainger	84.90%	8,131	13.27%	1,271	1.83%	175	9,577
Greene	79.82%	21,904	17.51%	4,804	2.67%	734	27,442
Grundy	81.06%	4,373	16.46%	888	2.48%	134	5,395
Hamblen	77.30%	18,183	20.46%	4,813	2.24%	528	23,524
Hamilton	56.29%	95,105	41.79%	70,608	1.92%	3,252	168,965
Hancock	86.39%	2,159	12.04%	301	1.57%	39	2,499
Hardeman	58.68%	5,377	37.67%	3,452	3.65%	334	9,163
Hardin	82.95%	9,221	14.38%	1,599	2.67%	296	11,116
Hawkins	82.06%	19,123	15.66%	3,649	2.28%	533	23,305
Haywood	46.14%	3,297	51.74%	3,697	2.12%	152	7,146
Henderson	82.73%	9,585	15.48%	1,793	1.79%	208	11,586
Henry	75.40%	10,595	21.16%	2,973	3.44%	484	14,052
Hickman	76.90%	7,284	20.31%	1,924	2.79%	264	9,472
Houston	72.85%	2,586	22.82%	810	4.33%	154	3,550
Humphreys	73.39%	5,752	22.77%	1,785	3.84%	301	7,838
Jackson	77.47%	3,837	19.95%	988	2.58%	128	4,953
Jefferson	79.80%	18,024	17.87%	4,035	2.33%	527	22,586
Johnson	82.41%	6,058	15.17%	1,115	2.42%	178	7,351
Knox	59.27%	128,662	39.09%	84,847	1.64%	3,570	217,079
Lake	70.52%	1,361	25.54%	493	3.94%	76	1,930
Lauderdale	65.44%	5,553	31.50%	2,673	3.06%	260	8,486
Lawrence	81.69%	14,270	15.85%	2,768	2.46%	431	17,469
Lewis	79.27%	4,234	18.52%	989	2.21%	118	5,341
Lincoln	79.55%	12,019	17.50%	2,644	2.95%	446	15,109
Loudon	76.40%	21,890	21.15%	6,061	2.45%	702	28,653
Macon	85.15%	7,522	12.50%	1,104	2.35%	208	8,834
Madison	57.70%	24,065	40.24%	16,781	2.06%	860	41,706
Marion	74.54%	9,517	23.15%	2,956	2.31%	295	12,768
Marshall	75.17%	10,650	22.26%	3,154	2.57%	364	14,168
Maury	68.49%	31,516	29.46%	13,557	2.05%	945	46,018
McMinn	80.28%	17,777	17.65%	3,908	2.07%	458	22,143
McNairy	80.77%	8,839	16.12%	1,764	3.11%	341	10,944
Meigs	80.62%	4,198	16.94%	882	2.44%	127	5,207
Monroe	80.86%	16,331	17.05%	3,444	2.09%	422	20,197
Montgomery	56.54%	41,342	39.21%	28,674	4.25%	3,105	73,121
Moore	82.04%	2,827	15.18%	523	2.78%	96	3,446
Morgan	84.51%	6,715	13.67%	1,086	1.82%	145	7,946
Obion	79.58%	10,236	17.47%	2,247	2.95%	380	12,863
Overton	79.35%	7,351	18.39%	1,704	2.26%	209	9,264
Perry	81.68%	2,617	16.14%	517	2.18%	70	3,204
Pickett	81.15%	2,264	17.03%	475	1.82%	51	2,790
Polk	81.25%	6,620	17.19%	1,401	1.56%	127	8,148
Putnam	71.77%	23,031	25.76%	8,268	2.47%	792	32,091
Rhea	81.62%	10,621	16.14%	2,100	2.24%	291	13,012
Roane	75.21%	19,038	21.56%	5,458	3.23%	817	25,313
Robertson	73.94%	23,877	23.32%	7,530	2.74%	886	32,293
Rutherford	58.11%	80,610	38.77%	53,782	3.12%	4,323	138,715
Scott	87.49%	7,307	10.09%	843	2.42%	202	8,352
Sequatchie	80.95%	5,598	16.67%	1,153	2.38%	164	6,915
Sevier	78.52%	33,531	18.58%	7,934	2.90%	1,238	42,703
Shelby	36.12%	135,043	61.05%	228,280	2.83%	10,600	373,923
Smith	78.77%	6,610	17.79%	1,493	3.44%	288	8,391
Stewart	79.07%	4,697	18.10%	1,075	2.83%	168	5,940
Sullivan	76.46%	55,506	21.64%	15,710	1.90%	1,375	72,591
Sumner	70.70%	63,031	26.78%	23,878	2.52%	2,242	89,151
Tipton	75.07%	19,554	22.21%	5,784	2.72%	709	26,047
Trousdale	75.28%	2,741	22.25%	810	2.47%	90	3,641
Unicoi	79.32%	6,267	18.34%	1,449	2.34%	185	7,901
Union	83.67%	6,365	14.29%	1,087	2.04%	155	7,606
Van Buren	79.93%	2,155	17.36%	468	2.71%	73	2,696
Warren	73.68%	10,998	22.85%	3,410	3.47%	518	14,926
Washington	68.20%	39,516	29.37%	17,021	2.43%	1,408	57,945
Wayne	86.75%	5,351	10.91%	673	2.34%	144	6,168
Weakley	75.90%	10,131	20.12%	2,686	3.98%	531	13,348
White	80.96%	9,475	17.02%	1,992	2.02%	237	11,704
Williamson	66.21%	91,155	31.55%	43,432	2.24%	3,080	137,667
Wilson	69.44%	50,597	27.53%	20,059	3.03%	2,209	72,865

Counties that flipped from Republican to Democratic

- Haywood (largest city: Brownsville)
- Shelby (largest city: Memphis)

State Senate district results

State House district results

==== By congressional district ====
Hagerty won seven of nine congressional districts.

District	Hagerty	Bradshaw	Representative
1st	77.1%	20.8%	Phil Roe
1st	77.1%	20.8%	Diana Harshbarger
2nd	66.0%	32.4%	Tim Burchett
3rd	66.8%	31.3%	Chuck Fleischmann
4th	68.7%	28.9%	Scott DesJarlais
5th	39.5%	57.4%	Jim Cooper
6th	74.2%	23.5%	John W. Rose
7th	69.0%	28.4%	Mark E. Green
8th	67.8%	30.1%	David Kustoff
9th	21.3%	75.7%	Steve Cohen

== See also ==
- Elections in Tennessee
- Political party strength in Tennessee
- Tennessee Democratic Party
- Tennessee Republican Party
- Government of Tennessee
- 2020 United States presidential election in Tennessee
- 2020 Tennessee elections
- 2020 United States elections

== Notes ==
Partisan clients
