= New Heart (Crash Adams song) =

Single by Crash Adams
- Released: 2025
- Genre: Pop
- Length: 3:04
- Label: Warner Music Canada

"New Heart" is a single by Crash Adams. The song was released by Warner Music Canada in 2025.

The song expresses the heartache of a broken relationship. It went viral on TikTok in 2025 through prank videos in which users threw water balloons at passersby. On the platform's Chinese equivalent, Douyin, the lyrics "doctor", "medicine", and "new heart" inspired medical professionals to create dance videos using the song; the metaphor of heartache in the song is reinterpreted literally by the trend.

In October 2025, Sophie Powers was featured on the song as a guest rapper.

== Charts ==
=== Weekly charts ===
Weekly chart performance for "New Heart"
Chart (2025–2026)	Peak position
Belarus Airplay (TopHit)	1
CIS Airplay (TopHit)	10
Costa Rica Anglo Airplay (Monitor Latino)	15
Estonia Airplay (TopHit)	122
Guatemala Anglo Airplay (Monitor Latino)	11
Kazakhstan Airplay (TopHit)	3
Latvia Airplay (TopHit)	195
Moldova Airplay (TopHit)	2
Russia Airplay (TopHit)	6
Ukraine Airplay (TopHit)	1

=== Monthly charts ===
Monthly chart performance for "New Heart"
Chart (2025–2026)	Peak position
Belarus Airplay (TopHit)	2
CIS Airplay (TopHit)	14
Kazakhstan Airplay (TopHit)	6
Moldova Airplay (TopHit)	3
Ukraine Airplay (TopHit)	3

=== Year-end charts ===
Year-end chart performance for "New Heart"
Chart (2025)	Position
Belarus Airplay (TopHit)	71
CIS Airplay (TopHit)	55
Kazakhstan Airplay (TopHit)	56
Moldova Airplay (TopHit)	145
Russia Airplay (TopHit)	39
