= 2026 Tennessee redistricting =

Mid-decade change to congressional districts

District lines used for the 2026 elections, per HB 7003 signed by the Governor of Tennessee on May 7, 2026 Interactive map version

Results of the 2024 United States presidential election in Tennessee under the 2022–2026 districts (top) and the map adopted in May 2026 (bottom): Trump (R) 50–60% 60–70% 70–80% / Harris (D) 70–80%

In April 2026, lawmakers from the Tennessee General Assembly began considering a mid-decade redistricting plan of their state's congressional districts ahead of the 2026 United States House of Representatives elections. On April 29, 2026, the United States Supreme Court ruled in Louisiana v. Callais that Louisiana's current redistricting map was an unconstitutional racial gerrymander under the Fifteenth Amendment. Following the decision, prominent Republican politicians began pushing for the redrawing of Tennessee's 9th congressional district, which covers most of Memphis and much of Shelby County. It is the state's only majority-minority district and its lone Democratic seat. On May 1, 2026, Governor Bill Lee called for a special session of the state legislature beginning on May 5 to review the state’s congressional map. The new map passed in both the state House and Senate on May 7, and Lee signed it into law the same day.

== Background ==
On April 29, 2026, the United States Supreme Court issued its decision in Louisiana v. Callais, partially overturning Section 2 of the Voting Rights Act of 1965. The provision had helped guarantee majority-minority districts by preventing districting plans that would dilute the ability of racial minorities to elect their own representatives. However, the court found the new Louisiana map to be an illegal racial gerrymander.

The court's decision came amidst a nationwide partisan redistricting campaign that began when President Donald Trump urged the Texas Legislature to redraw their congressional maps in June 2025. Other southern states, including Alabama, Louisiana, and Mississippi, began reviewing their maps alongside Tennessee following the Supreme Court ruling.

=== Support ===
Following the court's decision, many prominent Republicans called for Tennessee to redraw the state's congressional map and eliminate the 9th district's majority-minority and Democratic seat. The proposed redistricting would result in all nine of the state's congressional districts to become Republican leaning. On April 29, 2026, U.S. senator Marsha Blackburn posted on X in support of redistricting in order to "cement @realDonaldTrump’s agenda and the Golden Age of America." On the same day, U.S. representative John Rose similarly posted on X that, "Memphis deserves Republican representation in Congress." On April 30, Trump posted on Truth Social that he "had a very good conversation with Governor Bill Lee," and that Lee "would work hard to correct the unconstitutional flaw in the Congressional Maps of the Great State of Tennessee." Tennessee House Speaker Cameron Sexton wrote on the second day of the special session that the Supreme Court's decision in Louisiana v. Callais, "indicated states can redistrict based off partisan politics."

=== Opposition ===
The proposal to redraw Tennessee's congressional districts has been met by universal opposition from the state's Democratic leaders, with the move being described as racist gerrymandering. On April 29, 2026, U.S. representative Steve Cohen wrote on X that, "Trump and the GOP are coming for the power of Black voters in Memphis." On May 1, Democratic politicians denounced the proposal in a news conference held in Memphis outside of the National Civil Rights Museum, formally the Lorraine Motel, where Martin Luther King Jr. was assassinated in 1968. Speakers included Cohen, state Senate Minority Leader Raumesh Akbari, and state Senate Democratic Caucus Chair London Lamar. State Representative Justin J. Pearson, whose state House district makes up west Shelby County, also held a press conference the same day and launched a campaign called "Defend District 9". Hundreds of protesters gathered at the Tennessee State Capitol and Cordell Hull State Office Building throughout the three-day special session from May 5–7.

On May 7, 2026, District 19 representative Charlane Oliver disrupted a special session of the legislature held to redraw the congressional map. She stood on her desk, unfurled a banner with the text "Jim Crow 2.0" and "Stop the TN Steal", and sang the hymn "Lift Every Voice and Sing". State senate speaker Randy McNally blocked Oliver from voting on the map, and later issued a statement calling her conduct "disgraceful".

== Legislative history ==
On May 1, 2026, Governor Bill Lee signed a proclamation that called for a special session of the Tennessee General Assembly to begin at the Tennessee State Capitol in Nashville on May 5 in order to review the state's congressional maps. The proclamation stated that the statutory changes would help "facilitate 2026 congressional elections."

Since 1972, Tennessee state law had mandated that "districts may not be changed between apportionments," barring the state legislature from redrawing congressional maps mid-decade. On May 4, State House Speaker Cameron Sexton filed legislation to remove the language in order to pave the way for redistricting. On May 7, the state legislature approved a bill repealing the provision and it was signed into law the same day by Lee.

On May 6, state Republicans unveiled a proposed map showing Memphis and Shelby County carved up three ways between the 5th, 8th, and 9th congressional districts. On May 7, the new map was passed by both the Tennessee House of Representatives and the Tennessee Senate. Lee signed the bill into law later that day. Tennessee became the first state to pass a new congressional district map following the Supreme Court's weakening of the Voting Rights Act of 1965 in Louisiana v. Callais the week before.

Additionally on May 7, legislators adopted legislation to support the new map by creating a special qualifying period for candidates for the U.S. House of Representatives in the state. The original March 10 deadline was extended to May 15, with state political parties having until May 17 to deem if candidates are bona fide members. Candidates who already qualified for their primary could stay in their newly drawn district, switch to the district that had their previous number, or withdraw entirely.

== Legal challenges ==
Hours before the new map was passed, U.S. representative Steve Cohen, who represents Tennessee's 9th congressional district, announced he planned to sue. Hours after the new map was signed into law, the NAACP Tennessee State Conference sued to stop its implementation.

Primaries for the 2026 United States House of Representatives elections in Tennessee went ahead as planned on August 6, 2026.

On October 9, a federal court struck down any attempts at overturning the maps, allowing them to go forward.

== Partisan breakdown of new congressional map ==
Expected partisan gains under the new map using 2024 presidential election results Republican gain Republican hold

District	Incumbent	2024 U.S. presidential result		Notional outcome
District	Incumbent	2022 map	New map	Notional outcome
1st district	Diana Harshbarger (R)	+57.84%	+57.84%	Rep. hold
2nd district	Tim Burchett (R)	+33.86%	+33.86%	Rep. hold
3rd district	Chuck Fleischmann (R)	+35.89%	+35.73%	Rep. hold
4th district	Scott DesJarlais (R)	+43.58%	+23.93%	Rep. hold
5th district	Andy Ogles (R)	+17.90%	+23.08%	Rep. hold
6th district	John Rose (R)	+35.16%	+26.51%	Rep. hold
7th district	Matt Van Epps (R)	+22.21%	+22.40%	Rep. hold
8th district	David Kustoff (R)	+41.63%	+20.14%	Rep. hold
9th district	Steve Cohen (D)	−42.66%	+21.15%	Rep. gain

== Impact ==
After the maps were upheld, the incumbent representative of Tennessee's 9th congressional district, Steve Cohen, chose to retire rather than run for reelection in a firmly Republican seat. Republicans successfully flipped the district in the 2026 United States House of Representatives elections in Tennessee.

However, strong national results for the Democratic Party caused districts that were theoretically safe Republican seat to become competitive. This enabled Democratic candidate Victoria Broderick to defeat eight-term Republican incumbent Scott DesJarlais in Tennessee's 4th congressional district. The result was a rematch from 2024 under the previous district lines, when DesJarlais defeated Broderick by over 43%. Though the district was one of two that were significantly diluted to make the 9th district more Republican (the other being Tennessee's 8th congressional district), estimates of partisan lean placed the 4th district in favour of the Republicans by over 21%.

The partisan composition of Tennessee's congressional delegation remained the same after the election.

== See also ==
- 2025–2026 United States redistricting
- 2026 Florida redistricting
- 2026 Virginia redistricting referendum
- 2025 California Proposition 50
- 2026 Missouri Proposition A
- 2025 Texas redistricting
- 2026 Tennessee elections
- 2026 Tennessee gubernatorial election
- 2026 United States Senate election in Tennessee
