= Crash Adams =

Canadian pop music duo

- Origin: Toronto, Ontario Canada
- Genres: Pop
- Years active: 2019–present
- Label: Warner Music Canada
- Members: Rafaele Massarelli; Vince Sasso
- Website: crashadamsmusic.com

Crash Adams is a Canadian pop music duo from Toronto, most noted as Juno Award nominees for Breakthrough Group of the Year at the Juno Awards of 2024.

== Music career ==
The duo, consisting of Rafaele "Crash" Massarelli and Vince "Adams" Sasso, began making music together in the 2020s, but struggled to get attention until hitting on a social media strategy which involved transporting Massarelli's grandmother's red couch to unexpected locations to create short TikTok videos. With a quickly expanding fanbase, they released a number of singles over the next few years until signing to Warner Music Canada, which released the four-song EP California Girl in early 2023.

In 2023, they also participated in the Artists for Feel Out Loud supergroup cover of Serena Ryder's "What I Wouldn't Do". In 2025, the duo auditioned on America's Got Talent. They performed their original song "Optimist" and received 4 yeses, putting them through to the next round. Simon Cowell commented, "I liked it a lot, and the great thing, like Howie said is, if the song really is good, it's gonna react within minutes of this audition going out, which is brilliant."

== Discography ==
=== EPs ===
- California Girl (2023)
- Crashing Into Your Living Room, Vol. 1 (2024)
- Crashing Into Your Living Room, Vol. 2 (2025)

=== Charted singles ===
List of charted singles as lead artist, with selected chart positions, showing year released and album name
Title	Year	Peak chart positions										Album or EP
Title	Year	BLR Air.	CIS Air.	CRI Ang Air.	EST Air.	GTM Ang Air.	KAZ Air.	LAT Air.	MDA Air.	RUS Air.	UKR Air.	Album or EP
"Right Foot First"	2024	—	—	—	181	—	—	—	—	—	—	Crashing Into Your Living Room, Vol. 1
"New Heart"	2025	1	10	15	122	11	3	195	2	6	1	Crashing Into Your Living Room, Vol. 2
"—" denotes a recording that did not chart or was not released in that territory.
