= Manny Sethi =

Indian-American physician (born 1978)

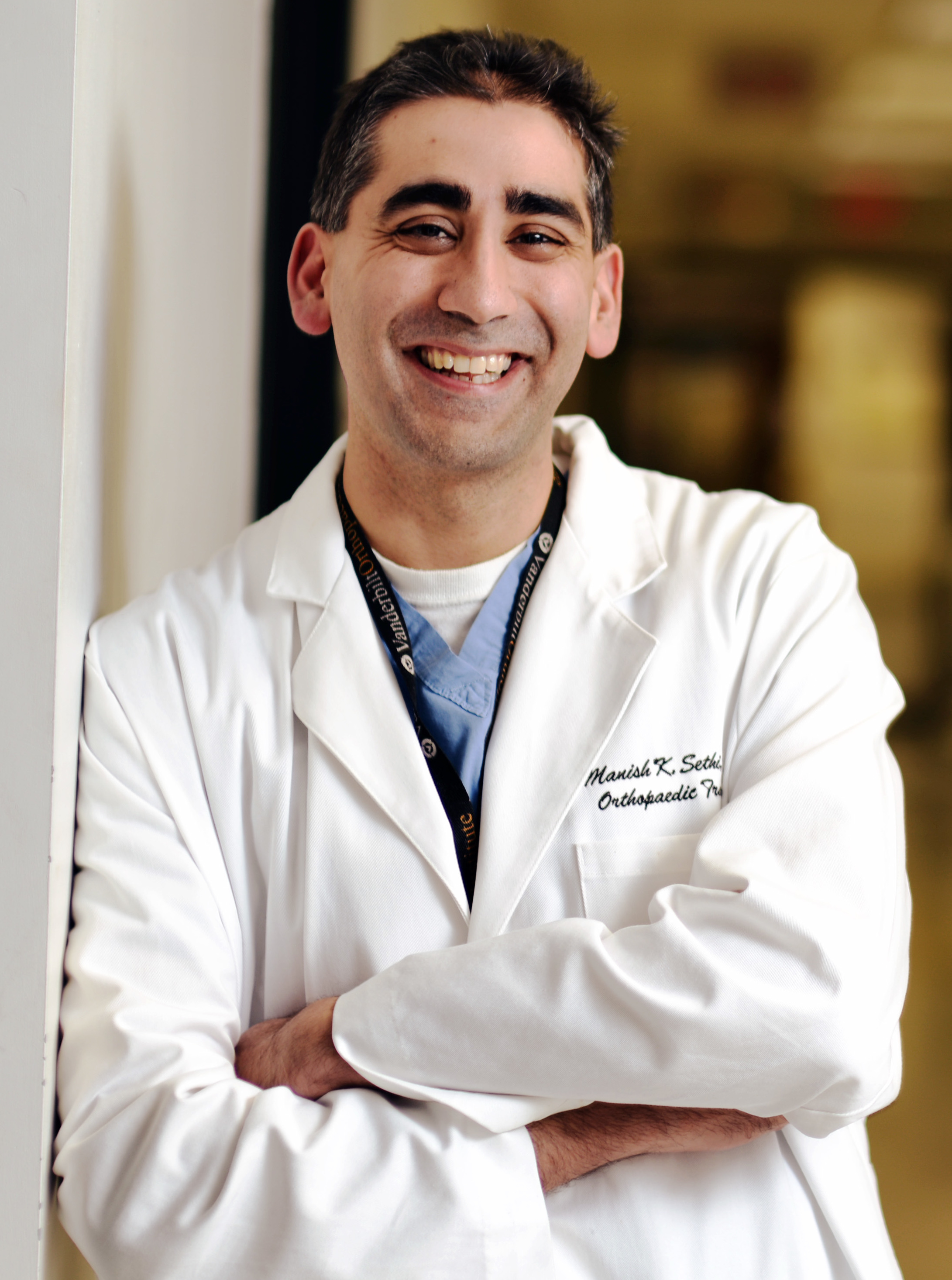
- Sethi in 2012
- Born: Manish Kumar Sethi; January 3, 1978 (age 48); Cleveland, Ohio, U.S.
- Education: Brown University (BA); Harvard University (MD)
- Political party: Republican
- Spouse: Maya Sethi
- Children: 2

Manish Kumar Sethi (born January 3, 1978) is an American physician and former political candidate. He is the president and founder of the non-profit Healthy Tennessee and an orthopedic trauma surgeon at Vanderbilt University Medical Center. Sethi serves as the director of the Vanderbilt Orthopedic Institute Center for Health Policy and is the lead author of the books An Introduction to Health Policy and Orthopedic Traumatology: An Evidence Based Approach.

Sethi was a Republican candidate in the 2020 United States Senate election in Tennessee. On August 6, 2020, Sethi lost the Republican primary to Bill Hagerty, a former diplomat in the Trump administration. Sethi received 39% of the primary vote.

== Early life and education ==
Sethi was born in Cleveland, Ohio and moved to Tennessee at age four. He was raised in Hillsboro, Tennessee by his parents, who were both physicians. His parents immigrated to the United States in 1975 from India. Sethi attended Hillsboro Elementary School and later attended the private Webb School.

After graduating from the Webb School, Sethi attended Brown University, where he earned a Bachelor of Arts degree in neuroscience. He graduated magna cum laude in 2000. The following year, Sethi worked with children with muscular dystrophy in Tunisia as a Fulbright Scholar.

Sethi attended Harvard Medical School, graduating in 2005. He completed his general surgery internship at the Massachusetts General Hospital in Boston in 2006, and completed his residency in the Harvard Combined Orthopedic Surgery Program from 2006 to 2010.

== Career ==
Sethi returned to Tennessee in 2010 and completed his fellowship in orthopedic trauma at Vanderbilt University Medical Center in 2011. He currently serves as an associate professor and orthopedic trauma surgeon and the director of the Vanderbilt Orthopedic Institute Center for Health Policy. Sethi's clinical interests center around the utilization of evidence-based medicine in the treatment of the orthopedic trauma patient.

Sethi has written multiple medical texts, including Orthopedic Traumatology: An Evidence-Based Approach, (first and second editions) and Orthopedic Surgery Examination and Board Review.

He has co-authored several articles in peer-reviewed medical journals, including Neurosurgery, Journal of Orthopaedic Trauma, Injury, the American Journal of Orthopedics, The Journal of Emergency Medicine, Journal of Injury and Violence Research, The Journal of Bone and Joint Surgery, and others.

=== Healthy Tennessee ===
Sethi and his wife, Maya, founded Healthy Tennessee in 2011. Healthy Tennessee is a 501(c)(3) nonprofit organization that promotes health education and provides community training opportunities. Healthy Tennessee was founded with a focus on combating Tennessee's poor national rankings in measurements of hypertension, diabetes, and obesity. The organization has also since increased its focus to include the opioid epidemic in Tennessee.

Healthy Tennessee has traveled across the state providing health screenings to insured, uninsured and TennCare patients. In 2014, Sethi received recognition from the American Medical Association (AMA) for his work in the community and Healthy Tennessee. In 2016, Sethi was recognized as one of HealthLeaders Magazine's "Top 20 Leaders in Medicine".

The organization has also hosted statewide community health summits with hundreds of healthcare stakeholders in Tennessee in attendance. Speakers at these summits have included the U.S. Surgeon General Jerome Adams, former Secretary of Health & Human Services Tom Price, Senator Marsha Blackburn, former Governor Phil Bredesen, Governor Bill Lee, and former Nashville Mayor Karl Dean.

=== Health policy ===
In 2017, Sethi was invited by Senator Lamar Alexander to testify before the United States Senate Committee on Health, Education, Labor and Pensions. He was one of five health care professionals to testify in a hearing entitled Stabilizing Premiums and Helping Individuals in the Individual Insurance Market for 2018: Health Care Stakeholders.

Also in 2017, Sethi was invited to the White House for a listening session with President Donald Trump. He was selected as one of eleven health care professionals from across the nation to discuss possible solutions to address difficulties in the health insurance market.

Sethi co-authored the book An Introduction to Health Policy with former-senator Bill Frist, who has served as a mentor for Sethi. Invested in health policy, Sethi founded the Vanderbilt Orthopedic Institute Center for Health Policy in 2010. The mission of the center is to increase physician advocacy for patients by investigating the most pressing issues in American health policy. Sethi and other colleagues at the Vanderbilt Orthopaedic Institute Center for Health Policy have written over 50 peer-review publications. Over the past few years, the center has implemented a conflict resolution program for children in public schools and community centers around the state.

Sethi served as the National Chairman of the American Medical Association Resident and Fellow Section and has served on the Committee on Publications of the New England Journal of Medicine. He has also written for the Agency for Healthcare Research and Quality and had a monthly health policy column in the magazine AAOS Now.

Sethi served as a health policy fellow at the Robert Wood Johnson Health Policy Center at Meharry Medical College. He served as an assistant professor at Meharry Medical College also in Nashville, where he ran a clinic and operating room providing indigent care. He also taught health policy at the undergraduate level at Vanderbilt University, serving as course director for MHS 0199, The Evolution of American Healthcare, an introductory course for college freshmen.

As of September 2019, Sethi had donated $1,042 to President Trump's 2020 re-election campaign.

=== 2020 U.S. Senate campaign ===
On June 2, 2019, Sethi announced his candidacy for the U.S. Senate election in Tennessee as a Republican.

Sethi faced businessman, diplomat, and former state government official Bill Hagerty, who served as the U.S. Ambassador to Japan for two years in the Trump administration. Trump endorsed Hagerty in late 2019.

Sethi was endorsed by several current and former Republican members of Congress, including Sen. Rand Paul (R-KY), Sen. Ted Cruz (R-TX), former Sen. Jim DeMint (R-SC), former Rep. Ed Bryant (R-TN-07), former Rep. John J. "Jimmy" Duncan Jr. (R-TN-02), and former Rep. Zach Wamp (R-TN-03).

=== 2022 election cycle ===
Sethi declined to run for Tennessee's 5th congressional district in the 2022 election.

== Personal life ==
Sethi is married to Maya L. Sethi, an attorney in Nashville. She received her undergraduate degree from Wellesley College and Juris Doctor degree from Boston University School of Law.

Sethi has two children, J.B. and Leela. The family attends McKendree United Methodist Church in Nashville, Tennessee.

Sethi wrote The American Dream in Tennessee: Stories of Faith, Struggle, and Survival in 2015, which details his family's story of immigration to Tennessee and building a life in America. The book also recounts the stories of several of his orthopedic trauma patients.
