= 2026 Tennessee gubernatorial election =

- November 3, 2026
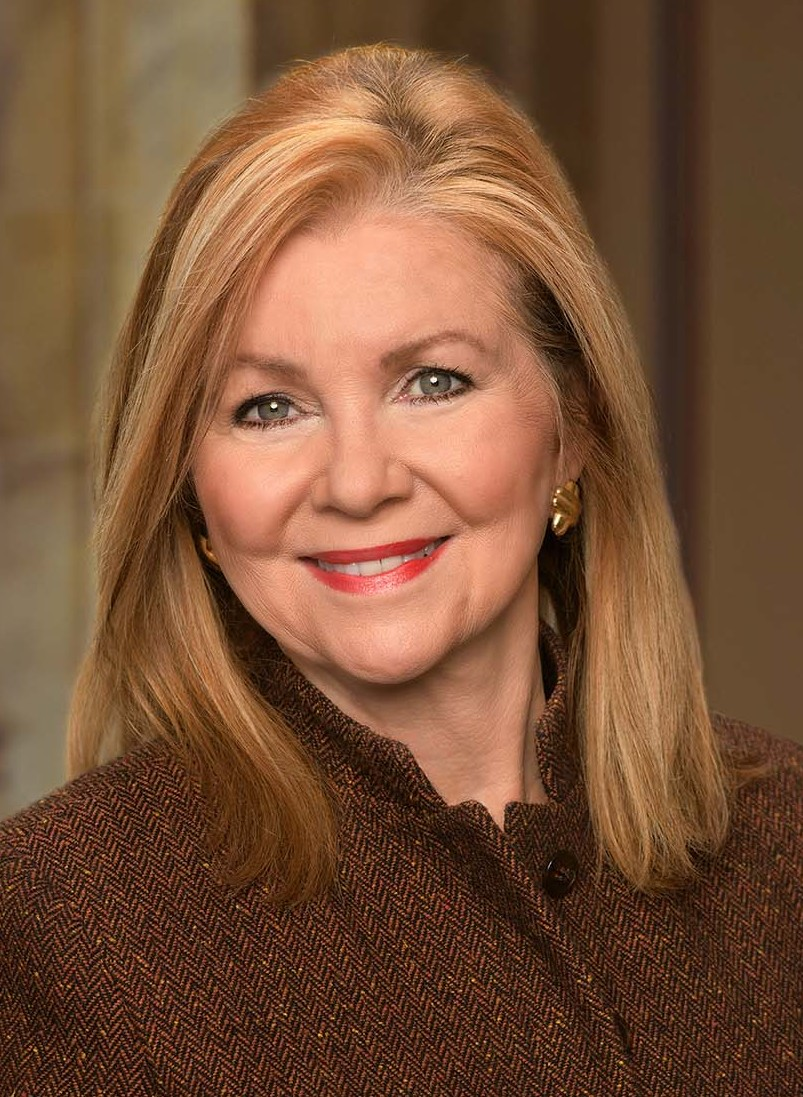

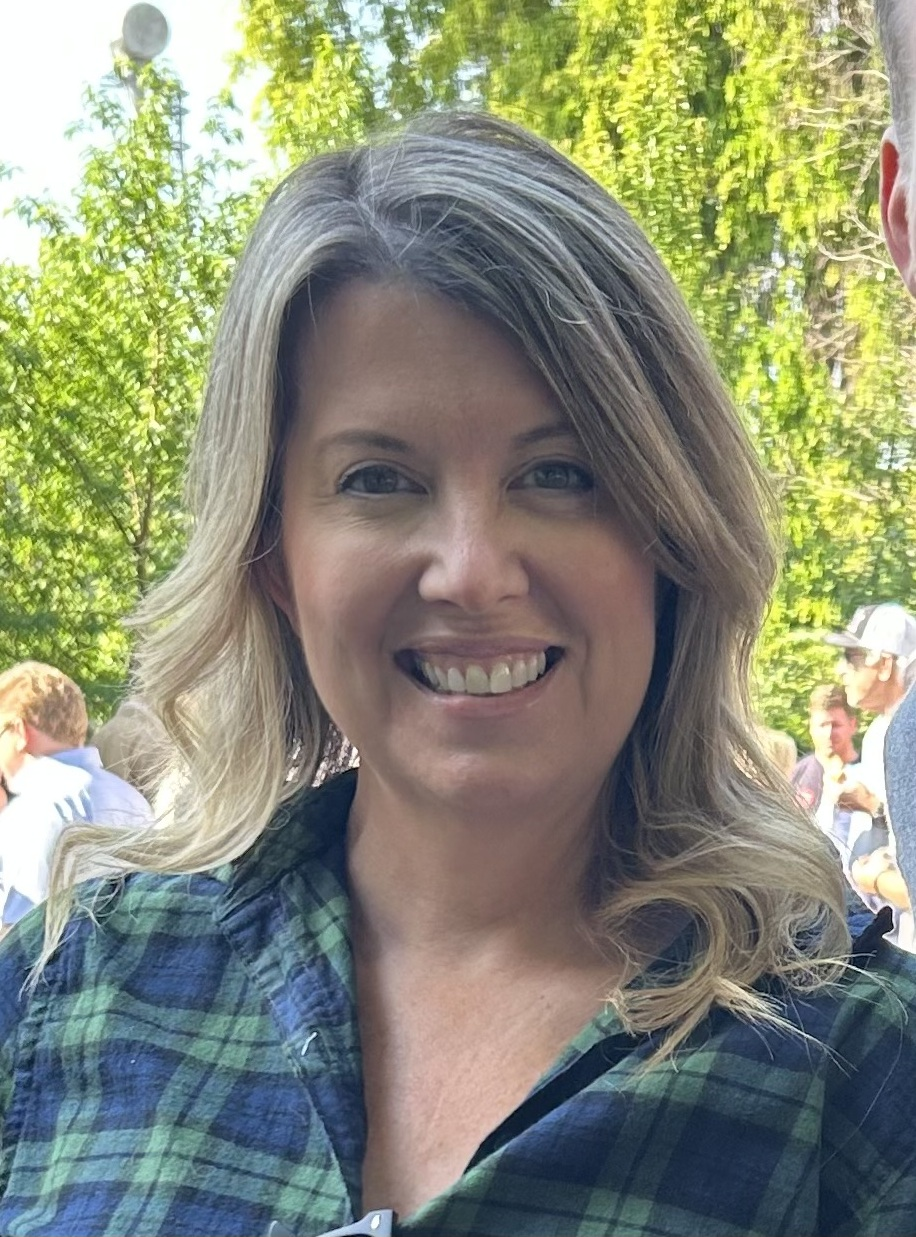

Nominee	Marsha Blackburn	Jerri Green	David Hatley
Party	Republican	Democratic	Independent
Popular vote	957,136	902,953	195,564
Percentage	45.52%	42.95%	9.30%
- County results Blackburn: 40–50% 50–60% 60–70% 70–80% Green: 40–50% 50–60% 60–70% 70–80%
Governor before election
Bill Lee
Republican
Elected Governor
Marsha Blackburn
Republican

The 2026 Tennessee gubernatorial election was held on November 3, 2026 to elect the governor of Tennessee for a four-year term starting on January 16, 2027. Incumbent Republican governor Bill Lee was term-limited and ineligible to seek a third consecutive term. Republican U.S. senator Marsha Blackburn narrowly defeated Democratic Memphis City Council member Jerri Green. Blackburn received 45.5% of the vote to Green's 43.0%, winning by approximately 54,000 votes.

The primary elections took place on August 6, 2026, with Blackburn and Green securing the Republican and Democratic nominations, respectively.

Blackburn significantly underperformed compared to previous Republican gubernatorial candidates. In 2022, Bill Lee won re-election by 32 percentage points, while Blackburn won by just 2.5 points. All 95 counties shifted toward Democrats, with Knox, Hamilton, Haywood, Madison, Montgomery, and Rutherford counties flipping Democratic. Independent candidate David Hatley also attracted support from conservative voters dissatisfied with Blackburn, receiving 9.3% of the statewide vote, or nearly 196,000 votes, and finishing third. This was the closest Tennessee gubernatorial election since 1896.

Blackburn became the first woman elected governor of Tennessee and the first candidate since 1932 to win the governorship with less than 50% of the popular vote, securing the smallest margin of victory in a Tennessee gubernatorial election in more than a century. She will take office in January 2027. Her victory extended Republican control of the governorship, which the party has held since 2011.

== Republican primary ==
=== Candidates ===
==== Nominee ====
- Marsha Blackburn, U.S. senator (2019–present)

==== Eliminated in primary ====
- Monty Fritts, state representative from the 32nd district (2023–present)
- John Rose, U.S. representative from Tennessee's 6th congressional district (2019–present)

==== Declined ====
- Mark Green, former U.S. representative from Tennessee's 7th congressional district (2019–2025)
- Bill Hagerty, U.S. senator (2021–present) (running for re-election; endorsed Blackburn)
- Tre Hargett, secretary of state of Tennessee (2009–present)
- Diana Harshbarger, U.S. representative from Tennessee's 1st congressional district (2021–present) (running for re-election)
- Pete Hegseth, United States Secretary of Defense (2025–present)
- Glenn Jacobs, former mayor of Knox County (2018–2026) (endorsed, and later appointed as campaign treasurer to, Blackburn)
- Stuart McWhorter, Tennessee commissioner of economic & community development (2022–present)
- Barry Wilmore, retired NASA astronaut and United States Navy test pilot

=== Endorsements ===
Marsha Blackburn

U.S. senators

- Bill Hagerty, Tennessee (2021–present)

U.S. representatives

- Tim Burchett, TN-02 (2019–present)
- Jimmy Duncan, former TN-02 (1988–2019)
- Chuck Fleischmann, TN-03 (2011–present)
- Matt Van Epps, TN-07 (2025–present)

State legislators

- Jack Johnson, majority leader of the Tennessee Senate (2019–present) from SD-27 (2007–present)
- William Lamberth, majority leader of the Tennessee House of Representatives (2019–present) from HD-44 (2013–present)
- 3 other state senators (Note: Tom Hatcher, SD-02 (2025–present); Ken Yager, SD-12 (2009–present); Page Walley, SD-24 (2021–present))
- 3 other state representatives (Note: Aron Maberry, HD-68 (2025–present); Jake McCalmon, HD-63 (2023–present); Lee Reeves, HD-65 (2025–present))

Local officials

- Glenn Jacobs, former mayor of Knox County (2018–2026)

Individuals

- Riley Gaines, conservative activist and former college athlete
- Dave Ramsey, radio personality

Organizations

- Americans For Prosperity
- Club for Growth
- National Rifle Association Political Victory Fund
- Tennessee Chamber of Commerce & Industry
- Tennessee Fraternal Order of Police
- Tennessee Professional Fire Fighters Association
- Turning Point Action
John Rose

U.S. representatives

- Diane Black, former TN-06 (2011–2019)

State legislators

- Mae Beavers, SD-17 (2003–2017)

Individuals

- Burwell B. Bell III, retired United States Army four-star general
Declined to endorse

Executive branch officials

- Donald Trump, president of the United States (2017–2021, 2025–present)

Statewide officials

- Bill Lee, governor of Tennessee (2019–present)

=== Polling ===
Aggregate polls

Source of poll aggregation	Dates administered	Dates updated	Marsha Blackburn	John Rose	Monty Fritts	Other/ Undecided (Note: Calculated by taking the difference of 100% and all other candidates combined.)	Margin
Race to the WH	through August 1, 2026	August 5, 2026	39.1%	28.3%	22.1%	10.5%	Blackburn +10.8%

Poll source	Date(s) administered	Sample size (Note: Key: A – all adults RV – registered voters LV – likely voters V – unclear)	Margin of error	Marsha Blackburn	John Rose	Monty Fritts	Other	Undecided
Wick (Note: Password to access poll is "govols") (Note: Poll sponsored by Americans for Prosperity)	July 29 – August 1, 2026	600 (LV)	± 4.0%	51%	32%	17%	–	–
Wick	July 29 – August 1, 2026	600 (LV)	± 4.0%	45%	28%	17%	–	9%
Fabrizio, Lee & Associates (R) (Note: Poll sponsored by Blackburn's campaign)	July 26–28, 2026	800 (LV)	± 3.5%	42%	25%	22%	–	11%
OnMessage Inc.	July 23–25, 2026	800 (LV)	± 3.5%	35%	31%	26%	–	9%
Fabrizio, Lee & Associates (R)	June 28–30, 2026	– (LV)	–	51%	20%	12%	–	17%
McLaughlin & Associates (R) (Note: Poll sponsored by Rose's campaign)	June 28–30, 2026	600 (LV)	–	44%	29%	13%	–	14%
Targoz Market Research (Note: Poll sponsored by the Beacon Center of Tennessee)	April 20–27, 2026	529 (LV)	± 4.2%	63%	10%	5%	–	22%
VictoryPhones (Note: Poll sponsored by Tennesseans for Student Success)	March 18–24, 2026	300 (LV)	± 5.7%	56%	14%	11%	–	20%
Cygnal (R)	March 16–17, 2026	500 (LV)	± 4.4%	58%	7%	–	5%	30%
VictoryPhones	February 5–8, 2026	– (LV)	–	61%	8%	5%	–	26%
Targoz Market Research	January 11–18, 2026	559 (LV)	–	56%	9%	7%	1% (Note: "Would not vote" with 1%)	27%
Targoz Market Research	October 26–29, 2025	545 (RV)	–	58%	9%	5%	–	29%
Quantus Insights (R)	August 5–7, 2025	–	–	35%	6%	–	22% (Note: "Someone else" with 14%; Tim Burchett with 5%; Cameron Sexton with 3%)	37%
Targoz Market Research	July 27 – August 1, 2025	623 (RV)	± 2.8%	66%	14%	–	–	19%
Fabrizio, Lee & Associates (R)	January 13–16, 2025	800 (LV)	± 3.5%	71%	13%	–	–	16%

=== Results ===
Results by county: Blackburn: 30–40%; 40–50%; 50–60%; 60–70%; Rose: 30–40%; 40–50%; 50–60%; 60–70%; Fritts: 40-50%; 50-60%

Results by precinct: Blackburn: 30–40%; 40–50%; 50–60%; 60–70%; 70–80%; 80–90%; 90–100%; Rose: 30–40%; 40–50%; 50–60%; 60–70%; 70–80%; 80–90%; 90–100%; Fritts: 30–40%; 40-50%; 50-60%; 60-70%; Tie: 30–40%; 40–50%; 50%; No Votes

Republican primary results
Party	Candidate	Votes	%
Republican	Marsha Blackburn	311,392	43.55%
Republican	John Rose	235,561	32.95%
Republican	Monty Fritts	168,004	23.50%
Write-in		1	0.00%
Total votes		714,958	100.00%

== Democratic primary ==
=== Candidates ===
==== Nominee ====
- Jerri Green, Memphis city councilor from the 2nd district (2024–present)

==== Eliminated in primary ====
- Carnita Atwater, museum president, candidate for governor in 2022, and candidate for mayor of Memphis in 2023
- Tim Cyr, home repair business owner
- Adam "Ditch" Kurtz, Nashville pedal steel musician
- Kevin Lee McCants, pastor

==== Declined ====
- Steve Cohen, U.S. representative from Tennessee's 9th congressional district (2007–present)

=== Endorsements ===
Jerri Green

State legislators

- Heidi Campbell, SD-20 (2020–present)

Local officials

- Lee Harris, mayor of Shelby County (2018–present)

Organizations

- Indivisible Tennessee
- Planned Parenthood Action Fund

=== Polling ===
Poll source	Date(s) administered	Sample size	Margin of error	Carnita Atwater	Tim Cyr	Jerri Green	Adam Kurtz	Kevin Lee McCants	Undecided
Targoz Market Research	April 20–27, 2026	400 (LV)	± 4.8%	8%	3%	14%	2%	11%	62%

=== Results ===
Results by county: Green: 40–50%; 50–60%; 60–70%; 70–80%; 80–90%; Atwater: 40–50%

Results by precinct: Green: 30–40%; 40–50%; 50–60%; 60–70%; 70–80%; 80–90%; 90–100%; Atwater: 20–30%; 40–50%; 50–60%; 60–70%; Tie: 20–30%; 30–40%; 40–50%; 50%; No Votes

Democratic primary results
Party	Candidate	Votes	%
Democratic	Jerri Green	244,277	69.04%
Democratic	Carnita Atwater	63,289	17.89%
Democratic	Kevin Lee McCants	18,972	5.36%
Democratic	Tim Cyr	14,799	4.18%
Democratic	Adam Kurtz	12,465	3.52%
Total votes		353,802	100.00%

== Independents ==
=== Candidates ===
==== Declared ====
- David Hatley, businessman
- Lauren Pinkston, former Lipscomb University professor
- Robert Vick, educator

== General election ==
=== Predictions ===
Source	Ranking	As of
The Cook Political Report	Solid R	October 29, 2026
Decision Desk HQ	Likely R	November 3, 2026
Fox News	Solid R	November 1, 2026
Inside Elections	Likely R	October 29, 2026
NBC News	Solid R	November 3, 2026
RealClearPolitics	Solid R	November 1, 2026
Sabato's Crystal Ball	Safe R	November 2, 2026
Silver Bulletin	Solid R	November 3, 2026

=== Post-primary endorsements ===
Marsha Blackburn (R)

Executive branch officials

- Donald Trump, U.S. president (2017–2021, 2025–present)
Jerri Green (D)

Statewide officials

- Tim Walz, governor of Minnesota (2019–present)

Labor unions

- Tennessee AFL-CIO
- United Auto Workers

Organizations

- Everytown for Gun Safety
David Hatley (I)

State legislators

- Janice Bowling, state senator from the 16th district (2013–present) (Republican)
Lauren Pinkston (I)

Statewide officials

- Kerry Healey, former lieutenant governor of Massachusetts (2003–2007) (Forward; elected as a Republican)
- Christine Todd Whitman, former governor of New Jersey (1994–2001) (Forward; elected as a Republican)

Political parties

- Forward Party
- Reform Party

=== Forums ===
2026 Tennessee gubernatorial election forum
No.	Date	Host	Link	Republican	Democratic	Independent	Independent
Key: P Participant A Absent N Not invited I Invited W Withdrawn							
Key: P Participant A Absent N Not invited I Invited W Withdrawn				Marsha Blackburn	Jerri Green	David Hatley	Lauren Pinkston
1	October 27, 2026	Tennessee Press Association; Middle Tennessee State University	YouTube	A	P	P	P

=== Polling ===
Poll source	Date(s) administered	Sample size	Margin of error	Marsha Blackburn (R)	Jerri Green (D)	David Hatley (I)	Other	Undecided
Targoz Market Research	October 24 – November 2, 2026	718 (LV)	± 3.58%	54%	35%	7%	2% (Note: Lauren Pinkston (I) & "Someone else" with 1%)	2%
GOTV Polling (Note: Poll sponsored by Hatley's campaign)	October 25–26, 2026	1,196 (V)	± 2.8%	35%	30%	26%	3% (Note: Lauren Pinkston (I) with 3%)	6%
Spry Strategies (R)	October 10–15, 2026	635 (LV)	± 3.9%	44%	32%	12%	2% (Note: Lauren Pinkston (I) and "Someone else" with 1%)	10%
TargetSmart (Note: Poll sponsored by The Progress Fund, which supports Green)	September 9–12, 2026	600 (LV)	± 4.0%	45%	36%	10%	2% (Note: Lauren Pinkston (I) with 2%)	7%
Targoz Market Research	August 15–26, 2026	1,149 (RV)	± 2.77%	46%	33%	–	8% (Note: "An independent candidate" with 8%)	14%
Targoz Market Research	August 15–26, 2026	601 (LV)	± 2.77%	55%	34%	–	7%	4%
Targoz Market Research	April 20–27, 2026	1,200 (RV)	± 2.8%	51%	27%	–	22%	
Quantus Insights (R)	August 5–7, 2025	600 (RV)	± 3.5%	49%	28%	–	7% (Note: "Wouldn't Vote for Either" with 7%)	17%

Hypothetical polling

John Rose vs. Jerri Green

Poll source	Date(s) administered	Sample size	Margin of error	John Rose (R)	Jerri Green (D)	Other	Undecided
Quantus Insights (R)	August 5–7, 2025	600 (RV)	± 3.5%	43%	27%	8% (Note: "Wouldn't Vote for Either" with 8%)	23%

=== Results ===
2026 Tennessee gubernatorial election
Party	Candidate	Votes	%	±%
Republican	Marsha Blackburn	957,136	45.52%	−19.39
Democratic	Jerri Green	902,953	42.95%	+10.03
Independent	David Hatley	195,564	9.30%	N/A
Independent	Lauren Pinkston	26,200	1.25%	N/A
Independent	Dean Brewer	4,098	0.19%	N/A
Independent	Ray Brown	2,880	0.14%	N/A
Independent	Wendell Jackson	2,372	0.11%	N/A
Independent	Eddie Lee Murphy	2,296	0.11%	N/A
Independent	Robert C. Vick	2,248	0.11%	N/A
Independent	Misam Abidi	2,110	0.10%	N/A
Independent	Charles Van Morgan	1,323	0.06%	N/A
Independent	L. Webb Taylor	1,113	0.05%	N/A
Independent	Dave Seeman	870	0.04%	N/A
Independent	Victor L. Scoggin	817	0.04%	N/A
Independent	Karl Knox Smithson	494	0.02%	N/A
Total votes		2,102,474	100.00%	
Republican hold				

==== By county ====
County	Marsha Blackburn Republican		Jerri Green Democratic		Various candidates Other parties		Margin		Total
County	#	%	#	%	#	%	#	%	Total
Anderson									
Bedford									
Benton									
Bledsoe									
Blount									
Bradley									
Campbell									
Cannon									
Carroll									
Carter									
Cheatham									
Chester									
Claiborne									
Clay									
Cocke									
Coffee									
Crockett									
Cumberland									
Davidson									
Decatur									
DeKalb									
Dickson									
Dyer									
Fayette									
Fentress									
Franklin									
Gibson									
Giles									
Grainger									
Greene									
Grundy									
Hamblen									
Hamilton									
Hancock									
Hardeman									
Hardin									
Hawkins									
Haywood									
Henderson									
Henry									
Hickman									
Houston									
Humphreys									
Jackson									
Jefferson									
Johnson									
Knox									
Lake									
Lauderdale									
Lawrence									
Lewis									
Lincoln									
Loudon									
Macon									
Madison									
Marion									
Marshall									
Maury									
McMinn									
McNairy									
Meigs									
Monroe									
Montgomery									
Moore									
Morgan									
Obion									
Overton									
Perry									
Pickett									
Polk									
Putnam									
Rhea									
Roane									
Robertson									
Rutherford									
Scott									
Sequatchie									
Sevier									
Shelby									
Smith									
Stewart									
Sullivan									
Sumner									
Tipton									
Trousdale									
Unicoi									
Union									
Van Buren									
Warren									
Washington									
Wayne									
Weakley									
White									
Williamson									
Wilson									
Totals									

Counties that flipped from Republican to Democratic

- Madison (largest city: Jackson)
- Montgomery (largest city: Clarksville)
- Hamilton (largest city: Chattanooga)
- Haywood (largest city: Brownsville)
- Knox (largest city: Knoxville)
- Rutherford (largest city: Murfreesboro)

== See also ==
- Elections in Tennessee
- Government of Tennessee
- Political party strength in Tennessee
- Tennessee Democratic Party
- Tennessee Republican Party
- 2026 Tennessee elections
- 2026 United States Senate election in Tennessee
- 2026 United States gubernatorial elections
- 2026 Tennessee redistricting

== Notes ==
Partisan clients
