= Marquita Bradshaw =

American environmentalist and political candidate (born 1974)

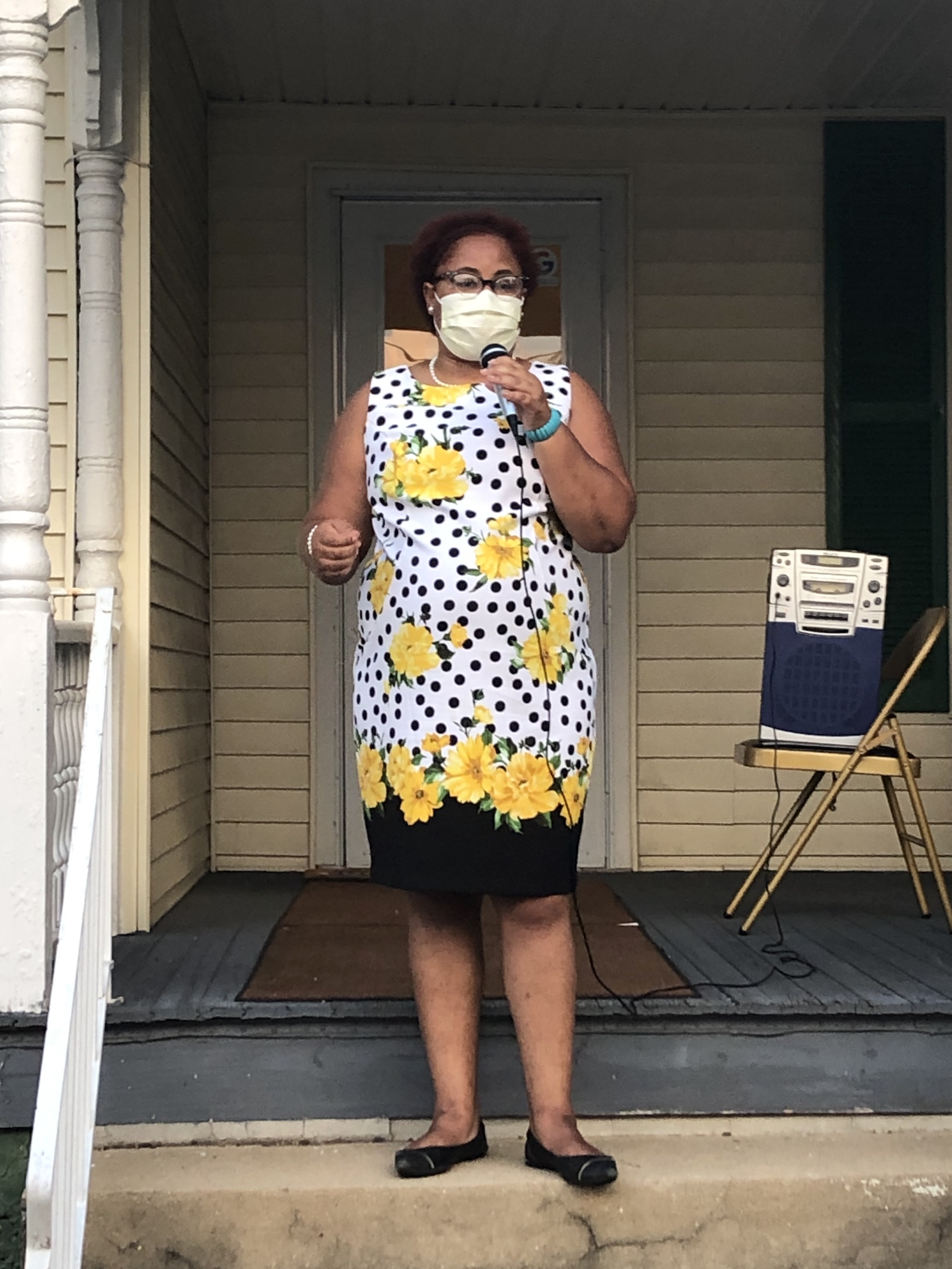
- Bradshaw in Morristown, Tennessee during the COVID-19 pandemic, 2020

Personal details
- Born: January 12, 1974 (age 52) Memphis, Tennessee, U.S.
- Party: Democratic
- Relations: John DeBerry (uncle)
- Children: 1
- Education: University of Memphis (BLS)
- Website: Campaign website

Marquita Bradshaw (born January 12, 1974) is an American environmentalist, activist, and political candidate. She became the first African American woman to win a major political party nomination in any statewide race in Tennessee as Democratic nominee in the 2020 United States Senate election. Bradshaw was also the Democratic nominee in the 2026 Senate election.

== Early life and education ==
Bradshaw was born and raised in Memphis, Tennessee. During her childhood, her family was active in raising awareness of pollution leaking from the Memphis Defense Depot, a contaminated military base in a largely African American neighborhood of Memphis that became a Superfund site in 1992. Her parents Kenneth and Doris Deberry Bradshaw organized around a military landfill with a group Defense Depot Memphis Tennessee Concerned Citizen Committee regarding the site because residents believed it was causing local health problems.

Bradshaw was influenced by her uncle John DeBerry, who was for many years a Democratic member of the Tennessee House of Representatives. Bradshaw earned a Bachelor of Liberal Studies in journalism and communication studies from the University of Memphis.

== Career ==
She is the environmental justice committee chair of the Sierra Club's Tennessee chapter. According to the Chattanooga Times Free Press, "She has worked with community advocacy groups, environmental organizations and unions, including the Mid-South Peace and Justice Center, the AFL–CIO, the Sierra Club and Tennesseans for Fair Taxation."

Following her unsuccessful 2020 U.S Senate bid, Bradshaw founded Sowing Justice, an organization striving to increase civic engagement and the cause of environmental justice.

In August 2021, a coalition of 466 environmentalist groups petitioned President Biden to replace Trump-appointed Neil Chatterjee as a member of the Federal Energy Regulatory Commission (FERC), naming Bradshaw as one of the three environmental justice activists they recommended. According to the petition, "We need a new FERC commissioner who will center science, justice, and equity, and end the era of dirty gas and other fossil fuels." According to Bradshaw, "We need a future in which the Federal Energy Regulatory Commission supports a just transition to be more effective and efficient, to eventually eliminate pollution as a byproduct of our energy sources and economy."

== U.S. Senate campaigns ==
=== 2020 ===
In October 2019, Bradshaw announced her candidacy for the US Senate seat held by retiring Senator Lamar Alexander. She told the Nashville Scene, "What's going on in the Senate is that socially and economically, they don't represent what the constituents of Tennessee look like. The majority of Senate members are millionaires, and I'm a working-class single mother. There are other working-class people across Tennessee, and sometimes when those policies come down, they have unintended consequences that hurt working people." Bradshaw told the Tri-State Defender that "we are leading with environmental justice principles." She told other reporters from WPLN News that "People of color, black people, brown people, indigenous people and poor white people are not experiencing the same set of laws as everybody else when it comes to the environment." In addition to environmental issues, her platform endorsed Medicare for All and the Green New Deal. She also supports universal background checks for gun purchases, keeping the Deferred Action for Childhood Arrivals in force, and overturning Citizens United v. FEC.

In the Democratic primary, Bradshaw was one of five candidates, including the DSCC-supported Army veteran James Mackler. Mackler's campaign had raised $2.1 million, while Bradshaw's funding by March was less than $10,000. By the end of the primary campaign, Bradshaw had raised $24,000. The general expectation was that Mackler would easily win against a divided field with four other candidates.

On August 6, Bradshaw won, with 35.5% of the votes, while Mackler came in third with 23.8%. Bradshaw's decisive primary win was unexpected; the Associated Press called it "an astonishing upset victory over the Democratic establishment's choice" that "has drawn national attention." Bradshaw's win was the first successful challenge to any DSCC-backed candidate since 2010. Prior to Bradshaw's win in the primary, neither Tennessee Democrats nor Tennessee Republicans had ever chosen a Black woman as their candidate for statewide office. After her win in the primary, Bradshaw was congratulated, and later endorsed, by the Sunrise Movement. In September, she was endorsed by Elizabeth Warren, Pete Buttigieg, Bernie Sanders and the Sierra Club. Bradshaw pledged to visit every one of Tennessee's 95 counties to campaign for the general election.

She faced Republican nominee Bill Hagerty in the November 3, 2020, general election. Hagerty defeated Bradshaw, receiving 62% of the vote to Bradshaw's 35%, a result that Facing South attributed in part to Tennessee's restrictive voting laws and the failure of national organizations to help fund Bradshaw's campaign. (Kentucky Democrat Amy McGrath, with $90M funding as opposed to Bradshaw's $1.5M, lost to her opponent Mitch McConnell by a similar margin). Republicans have held both of Tennessee's Senate seats since 1994, when Republican Bill Frist defeated Democratic incumbent Jim Sasser.

=== 2024 ===
Bradshaw was a candidate in the 2024 United States Senate election in Tennessee, losing to Gloria Johnson in the Democratic primary.

=== 2026 ===
Bradshaw was a candidate in the 2026 United States Senate election in Tennessee, who competed against four opponents for the Democratic primary nomination. She became the nominee on August 6, 2026. She lost to the Republican incumbent Republican senator Bill Hagerty in the November 3rd general election.

== See also ==
- Black women in American politics
- List of African-American United States Senate candidates

Party political offices
| Preceded by Gordon Ball | Democratic nominee for U.S. Senator from Tennessee (Class 2); 2020, 2026 | Most recent |
