= Tennessee House of Representatives 90th district =

State legislative district in Tennessee

Tennessee's 90th State House of Representatives district
- Map of Tennessee House districts with the 90th District shaded in red
Representative
Gloria Johnson; D–Knoxville
since 2023
- Demographics: 73.9% White; 11.4% Black; 7.8% Hispanic; 2.1% Asian; 4.5% Multiracial
- Population (2024): 69,129

The Tennessee House of Representatives 90th district is one of the 99 legislative districts in the lower house of the Tennessee General Assembly. The district is located in East Tennessee and covers central Knox County. It is made up of parts of north and west Knoxville. It includes areas such as West Hills, West Knoxville, Inskip, Whittle Springs, North Knoxville, and Downtown North. Gloria Johnson has represented the district since 2023.

== Demographics ==
The Tennessee Comptroller estimates the population as of 2024 at 69,129.

- 73.9% of the district is White
- 11.4% of the district is Black
- 7.8% of the district is Hispanic
- 2.1% of the district is Asian
- 4.5% of the district is Two or more races

Detailed demographic information is also available through Census Reporter.

== History ==
The 88th Tennessee General Assembly was the first in which all districts were numbered. The 90th district was in Shelby County at this time.Since the 113th General Assembly, district 88 has been part of Knox County.

== List of Representatives ==
Representative	Party	Years of Service	General Assembly	Hometown
Gloria Johnson	Democratic	2023 - present	113th-114th	Knoxville
Torrey Harris	Democratic	2021-2022	112th	Memphis
John DeBerry	Democratic	1995-2020	99th-111th	Memphis
Karen Williams	Republican	1983-1994	93rd-98th	Memphis
John W. Spence	Democratic	1975-1982	89th-92nd	Memphis
Henry Craft	Republican	1973-1974	88th	Memphis
