= The Kids of Rutherford County =

Investigative journalism podcast

The Kids of Rutherford County is an investigative journalism podcast about the Rutherford County, Tennessee juvenile arrest and incarceration scandal. It is hosted by Meribah Knight and produced by Serial Productions, ProPublica, and Nashville Public Radio. The soundtrack was written by The Blasting Company.

== Background ==
The show is a four-episode series hosted by Meribah Knight and produced by Serial Productions, in collaboration with ProPublica and Nashville Public Radio. The first two episodes were released on October 26, 2023. The two remaining episodes were released weekly on the following Thursdays. The show uses the same style presentation as Serial.

The show starts with a fight between middle school children; subsequently, several minors were arrested and sent to juvenile detention, some of whom were not present during the fight. Some of the wrongfully incarcerated children had also been subjected to solitary confinement.

Donna Scott Davenport was the county's singular juvenile court judge. Davenport had designed and oversaw an extralegal system which had dominated the juvenile court, including all cases before it, during 2000 through 2022. The show investigates a decade of questionable cases involving a large number of children.
