= James E. Walker Library =

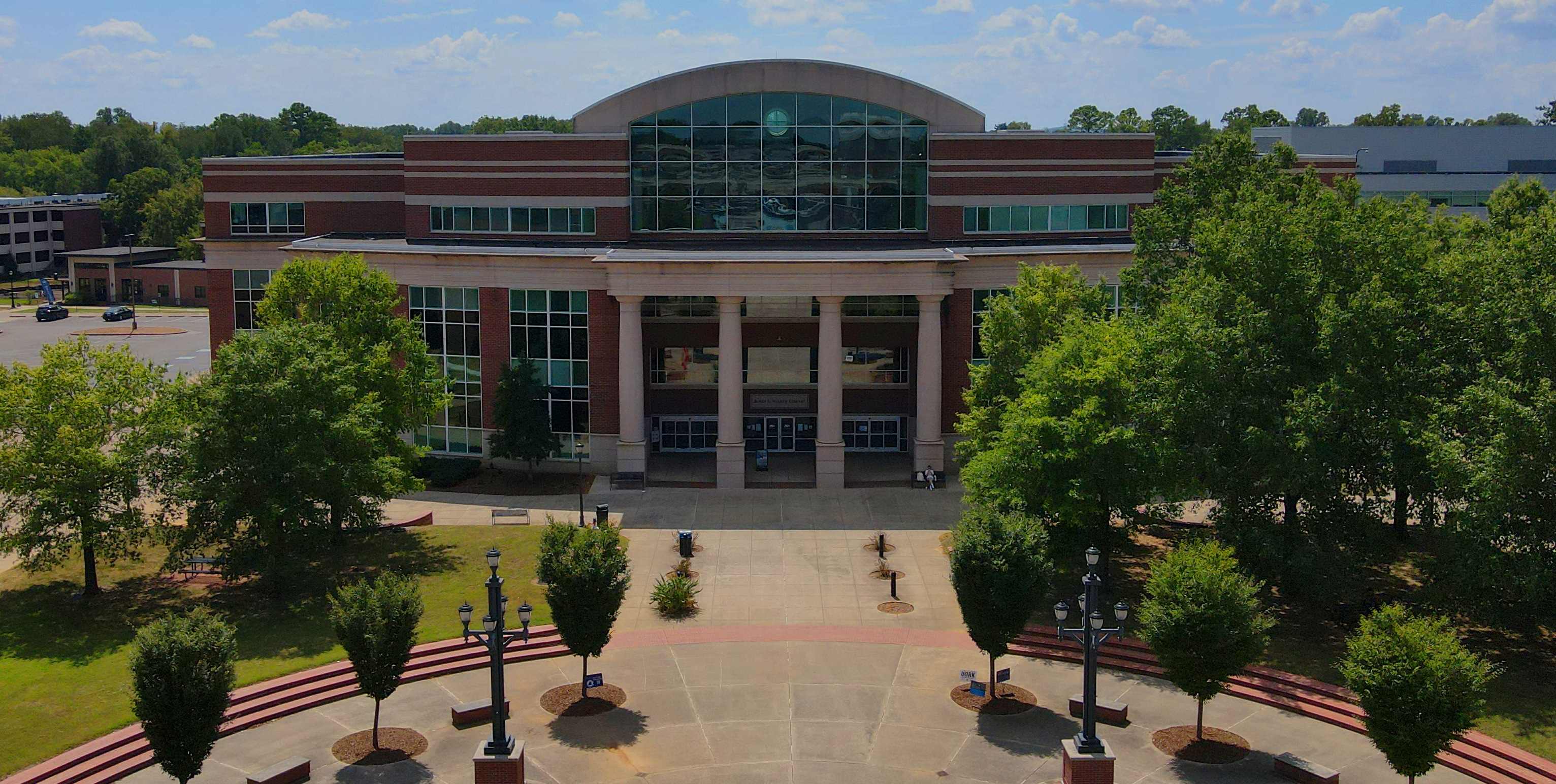
- The Library seen from an aerial view
- 35.84658°N 86.36397°W
- Location: Murfreesboro, Tennessee, United States
- Type: Academic
- Established: 1999

Collection
- Size: 1 million+

Access and use
- Access requirements: Public
- Population served: 30,000 on campus + surrounding community

Other information
- Director: Kathleen L. Schmand
- Website: library.mtsu.edu

The James E. Walker Library is the campus library of Middle Tennessee State University (MTSU). Opened in 1999 under university president James E. Walker, it replaced an older library in Todd Hall, now home to the Art Department. A four-story, 250,000-square-foot (23,000 m^{2}) building, the MTSU library contains over 1 million volumes and more than 33,000 periodicals.

Construction on the James E. Walker Library started on the 85th anniversary of the university's founding, September 11, 1996. The old Todd Library, which had been expanded to a capacity of 225,000, held almost three times that many when the new library opened.

== Library departments ==
The James E. Walker Library houses offerings in 24 distinct departments, including:

- Acquisitions
- Administration
- Cataloging
- Circulation
- Collection Development
- Collection Management Department
- Curriculum Collection
- Digital Initiatives
- Digital Media Studio
- Distance Education
- Electronic Resources
- Government Documents
- Interlibrary Loan
- Library Systems
- Microtext
- Periodicals
- Reference and Instruction
- Reserves
- Serials
- Service Desk
- Special Collections
- Technology Services
- User Services Department
- Web & Discovery

== Gallery ==
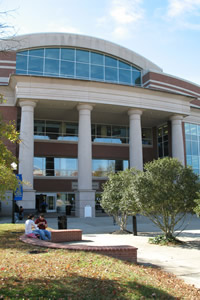
Front of the building

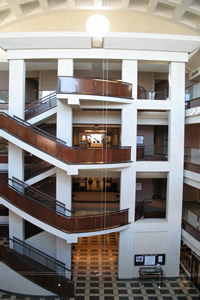
Staircases

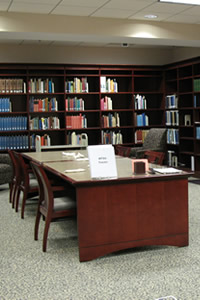
Special Collections reading room

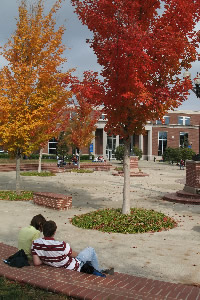
Library quad
