= John DeBerry =

American politician (born 1951)

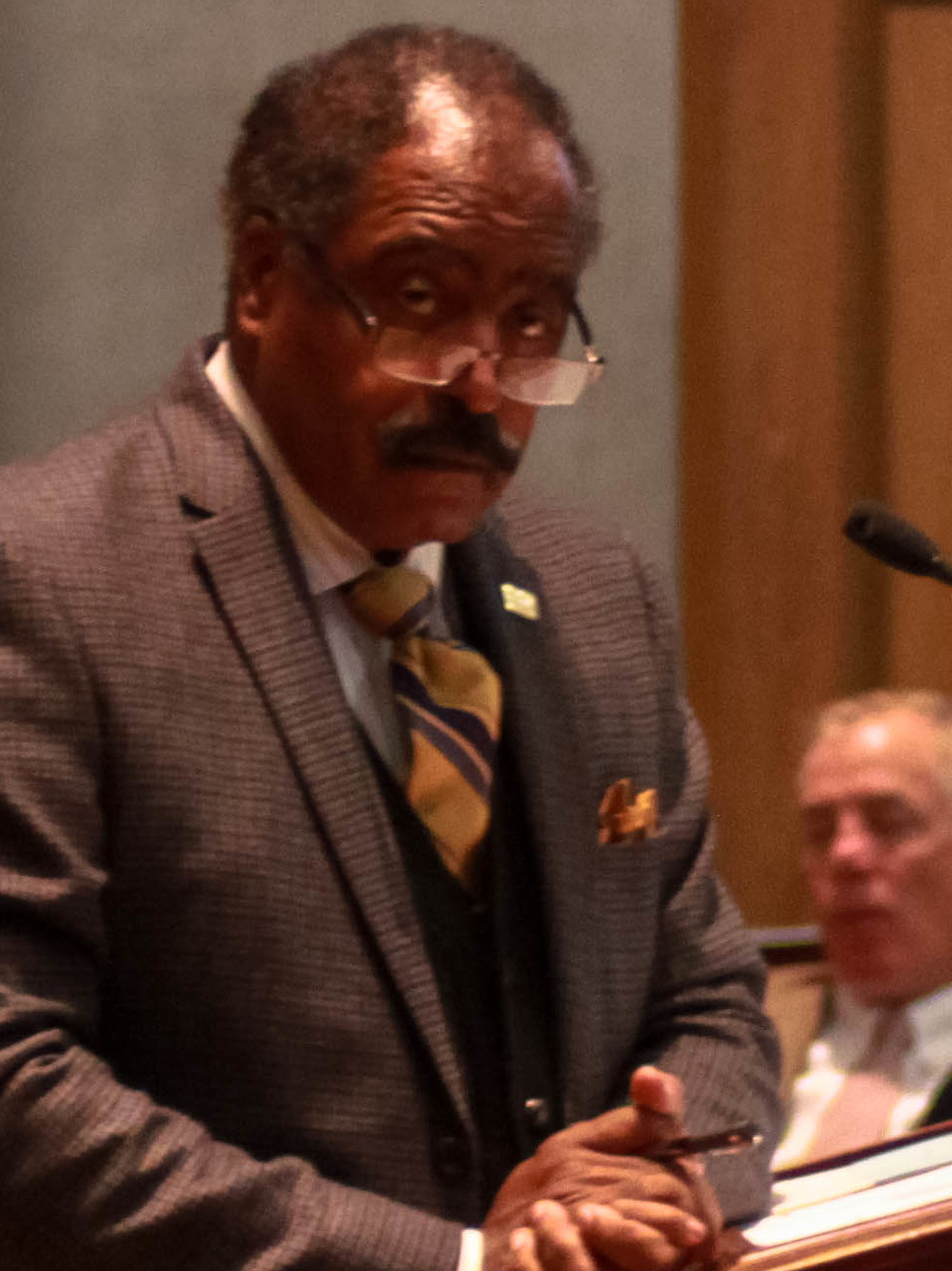
- DeBerry in 2014

Member of the Tennessee House of Representatives from the 90th district
- In office January 1995 – January 12, 2021
- Preceded by: Karen Williams
- Succeeded by: Torrey Harris

Personal details
- Born: February 5, 1951 (age 75)
- Party: Democratic (before 2020); Independent (2020–2026); Republican (2026–present)
- Relatives: Marquita Bradshaw (niece)
- Education: Freed–Hardeman University; University of Memphis

John J. DeBerry Jr. (born February 5, 1951) is an American pastor and politician who served as a Democratic member of the Tennessee House of Representatives, representing District 90 from 1995 to 2021. Unlike many national Democrats, DeBerry is anti-abortion. Republican Governor Bill Lee appointed him to become his senior advisor from December 1, 2020 to February 12, 2026.

He ran as a Republican in the 2026 Shelby County mayoral election.

== Education ==
DeBerry graduated from Freed–Hardeman University and the University of Memphis.

== Career ==
=== Democratic Party removal from ballot ===
In May 2020, the Tennessee Democratic Party's State Executive Committee voted 41 to 18 to remove DeBerry from the Democratic primary ballot after 26 years in office. One of the committee members who voted to remove him said that DeBerry wasn’t “exemplifying the basic Democratic principles.“ DeBerry's anti-abortion views were a major factor. DeBerry himself protested that it hadn't been the voters in his district that had taken him off the ballot rather, "A tribunal took me off the ballot that has absolutely nothing to do with my district."

=== 2020 protests ===
On August 1, 2020, DeBerry, as a Tennessee State Representative, delivered remarks on the floor of the Tennessee State Legislature during a debate with lawmakers on a law to increase penalties for demonstrators suspected of certain violent offences against police officers. During the debate, DeBerry gave a speech that had a large impact on social media. In the speech, DeBerry argued that the protests going on in the U.S at the time would be more successful if they remained peaceful.

He spoke about rioters and demonstrators in Portland, Seattle and elsewhere in the U.S. and the negative impacts of them due to the destruction, violence, and property damage caused across the country. He argued that people did not have the right to destroy taxpayer-funded property. He recalled that his family had participated in civil rights activism in the mid-twentieth century and he personally witnessed the civil rights protests of the time. He also remembered that in his early life, he had to walk into public places through back doors, sit in the back of buses, drink out of the "colored" water fountain, and attend a racially segregated school because the law forced him to. He argued that the civil rights movement overcame these things because it had integrity and class, worked peacefully and had common sense and strong values.

=== Later career ===
On November 30, 2020, Tennessee Governor Bill Lee announced that DeBerry would serve as a special advisor in his administration. He assumed office on December 1, 2020.

== Electoral history ==
- 1994: DeBerry was initially elected in the 1994 Democratic primary and November 8, 1994 general election.
- 1996: DeBerry was unopposed for both the 1996 Democratic primary and the November 5, 1996 general election.
- 1998: DeBerry was challenged in the August 6, 1998 Democratic primary, winning with 2,886 votes (91.1%), and won the November 3, 1998 general election with 4,785 votes (86.9%) against Independent candidate Laverne Crockett.
- 2000: DeBerry was unopposed for both the August 3, 2000 Democratic primary, winning with 1,691 votes, and the November 7, 2000 general election, winning with 8,329 votes.
- 2002: DeBerry was unopposed for both the August 1, 2002 Democratic primary, winning with 6,719 votes, and the November 5, 2002 general election, winning with 10,245 votes.
- 2004: DeBerry was unopposed for both the August 5, 2004 Democratic primary, winning with 3,053 votes, and the November 2, 2004 general election, winning with 16,514 votes.
- 2006: DeBerry was unopposed for both the August 3, 2006 Democratic primary, winning with 5,791 votes, and the November 7, 2006 general election, winning with 11,881 votes.
- 2008: DeBerry was unopposed for both the August 7, 2008 Democratic primary, winning with 4,900 votes, and the November 4, 2008 general election, winning with 15,577 votes.
- 2010: DeBerry was unopposed for both the August 5, 2010 Democratic primary, and the November 2, 2010 general election, winning with 8,543 votes.
- 2012: DeBerry was challenged in the three-way August 2, 2012 Democratic primary, winning with 4,084 votes (59.7%), and was unopposed for the November 6, 2012 general election, winning with 18,100 votes.
- 2020: DeBerry was removed from the ballot by his party for the August 2020 Democratic primaries because of his history of aligning with the Republicans in votes and donations, and ran in the general election as an independent. In the general election against Democrat Torrey Harris, DeBerry won 22.7% of the vote.
