= Rutherford County, Tennessee, juvenile arrest and incarceration scandal =

The juvenile justice system and jail of Rutherford County, Tennessee, became a subject of state-wide, national, and international controversy in the 2020s, when a journalistic investigation revealed a pattern of abnormal and illegal incarceration of hundreds, perhaps thousands, of children in the county's juvenile jail at a rate ten times the state's average.

== Establishment and promotion ==
In 2000, Rutherford County created the post of Juvenile Court Judge. The post was filled by then-Democrat (later Republican) elected Judge Donna Scott Davenport, who was scheduled to (and did) retire at the end of her eight-year term, in August 2022. Davenport controlled the county's juvenile justice procedures.

In 2003, Judge Davenport issued a memo which was interpreted to order that, after a summons is issued, law enforcement officers must always physically arrest the child, and take them to the county's detention center—despite Tennessee state law which requires that, for many juvenile misdemeanor offenses, police officers must release children with a citation or a summons, and not take them into custody.

By April 2008, county authorities were reporting 2,000 children booked into the jail annually—200 to 300 of them from neighboring counties lacking facilities.

In 2008, the county built a $23,300,000 expansion of the county jail—including a 43,000 sq ft (4,000 m^{2}) "juvenile detention center." County officials repeatedly compared the jail to a business—one commissioner saying he wished that the jail could be a "profit center". Correctional superintendent Alan Miller described the adult jail as a "workhouse like environment [that would] allow [the county] to benefit from workhouse labor."

Subsequently, the county government began soliciting other counties in Tennessee and surrounding states to send their "detained youth" to the Rutherford County juvenile jail for incarceration, at $175 per day per child. In a promotional video, the county indicated that over 20 Tennessee counties had contracted with Rutherford's juvenile jail. The marketing video, "What Can the Rutherford County Juvenile Detention Center Do For You?” features images of children in black-and-white striped prison uniforms, and is narrated by Judge Davenport, who designed that juvenile court's unique, extralegal system of incarcerating children. As of 2021, 39 Tennessee counties were contracting with Rutherford County to imprison youth, along with the U.S. Marshals Service.

== Operations and procedures ==
During the following years, the juvenile court's sole presiding judge and local authorities colluded in the arrest and incarceration of hundreds of children, some as young as seven years old, on various misdemeanor charges, including schoolyard fights, truancy and cursing. At Judge Davenport's instruction, all arrested children were to be jailed immediately in the detention center, pending adjudication and assessment.

Research by Nashville Public Radio and ProPublica found the Rutherford County juvenile incarcerations to be far out of the national norm for juvenile arrests, and further discovered that the county authorities had charged some of the children under non-existent laws, as directed by Judge Davenport. The researchers found that, among Tennessee children referred to juvenile court, the statewide rate of incarceration was 5%, but in Rutherford County it was 48%.

Once delivered to the jail by law enforcement officers, the children were evaluated through a filter system designed by Davenport and implemented by Rutherford County Juvenile Detention Center Director Lynn Duke, in 2008, to determine the level of risk they were thus deemed to pose, and the level of restraint and duration of confinement for the child to be subjected to. Decisions were reportedly made with undefined and arbitrary criteria, rather than the precise categories specified in Tennessee law. In particular, racial minority children were disproportionately among those jailed, the researchers found.

== Cases resulting in class action lawsuits ==
In 2016, 11 African-American elementary school children in Rutherford County, ranging in age from 8 to 12, were detained or jailed, or both, after allegedly witnessing a fight between a 5-year-old and a 6-year-old. Some of the children were alleged to have been guilty by being present at the fight, and were alleged by authorities to be guilty of "criminal responsibility for conduct of another" — a non-existent law. To settle a lawsuit in 2017, Rutherford County agreed to $397,500 in payments to the 11 children, and the officer who signed the charges was briefly suspended, while other officers involved received 1-day suspensions or reprimands.

Also in 2016, a 15-year-old was placed in solitary confinement for 5 days with only a mattress and toilet. The family filed a complaint against the Rutherford County Juvenile Detention Center, with support from the ACLU. Judge Davenport responded by issuing an order suspending the use of solitary confinement, in the juvenile jail, temporarily. Another child was jailed four days while denied his psychiatric medication, and Judge Davenport ordered a developmentally disabled child into indefinite solitary confinement.

Class action federal lawsuits resulted, and though not admitting fault, the county accepted a ban on any further solitary confinement of children in its custody.

In May 2017, a federal court ordered Rutherford County to stop using their "filter" system, noting that it "departs drastically" from ordinary juvenile detention standards. The court wrote that the "illegal detention" is causing "irreparable harm every day" to children in the jurisdiction.

== Outcomes ==
In June, 2021, Rutherford County settled with plaintiffs in a class action, by agreeing to payments up to $11 million, with individual payouts estimated at around $1,000 per wrongful arrest, and about $5,000 per unlawful detention—though, again, the county, "denies any wrongdoing in any of the lawsuits filed against it." However—though an estimated 1,450 potential claimants were believed to be eligible—within a month of the October 29, 2021 deadline for filing a claim, only a fraction had been contacted, and only 200 had filed claims. The settlement amount was amended to $5.1 million in December 2021. The settlement was subsequently denied by the county's insurer, Lloyd's of London, which wrote that the county was aware of its illegal juvenile detention practices prior to its coverage by the insurer, but "concealed or misrepresented material facts" to obtain the policy, effectively voiding the insurance policy. The county filed a federal lawsuit against the insurer in December 2022, claiming the policy as valid.

Despite various complaints being filed to various entities, the child-arrest-and-incarceration practices of Rutherford County continued (as of early October 2021).

However, following the October 8, 2021 publication of the ProPublica / Nashville Public Radio investigation, various state legislators called for investigations and reform, and the "concerned" Tennessee governor's office called for "appropriate judicial authorities [to] issue a full review."

In August 2022, Republican Juvenile Court nominee Travis Lampley won the judgeship, stating the goals of restoring confidence in the court, and pledged "to uphold the integrity of the family unit". The Rutherford County Commission is assembling a new Juvenile Detention Board to "oversee incarceration operations", effectively replacing Judge Davenport as oversight for juvenile detention staff, led by Director Lynn Duke.

In January 2023, State Representative Mike Sparks introduced House Bill 720 to the Tennessee General Assembly, undertaking to protect juveniles from interrogation without a guardian present. Representative Gloria Johnson, one of two Democrats who had sought to oust Davenport in 2022, remarked, in 2023, that Davenport "didn’t care about the laws... They ignored the laws and created their own... I don’t know if it would stop that", in reference to the proposed legislation.

== Juvenile justice system of Judge Donna Scott Davenport ==
Donna Scott Davenport was the sole judge of the juvenile justice system for the county, appointing magistrates (formerly Referees), setting rules and presiding over cases that include everything from children accused of breaking the law to parents accused of neglecting their children. She held her position as Juvenile Court Judge from its creation in 2000 until her retirement in 2022.

Davenport first took the bar exam about a year after finishing law school but only passed on the fifth time. She was admitted to practice law in 1995, nine years after getting her law degree. Davenport created a "process" different from federal or local norms that asks law enforcement to arrest, transport to the detention center for screening and then file charging papers. The process ordered by her was amended later after she declared that even kids accused of minor violations like truancy must be taken into custody and transported to jail.

On October 12, after a PBS News Hour broadcast singled out Judge Davenport as the principal responsible party for an extralegal juvenile incarceration system that she had designed herself, Middle Tennessee State University announced that Davenport was no longer on the university's faculty.

In February 2022, Kyle Mothershead, a lawyer representing the 2017 class-action plaintiffs, stated that Rutherford County had illegally arrested and incarcerated minor children prior to Davenport's appointment as its juvenile court judge in 2000.

== Podcast ==
The juvenile justice system under Judge Davenport is narrated in a four-part podcast, The Kids of Rutherford County. Released in October 2023, the series is produced by Serial Productions and The New York Times in partnership with ProPublica and Nashville Public Radio, and hosted by Meribah Knight of WPLN.
