= Eddie Smith (politician) =

American politician (born 1979)

Member of the Tennessee House of Representatives
- In office January 13, 2015 – January 8, 2019
- Preceded by: Gloria Johnson
- Succeeded by: Gloria Johnson

Personal details
- Born: April 11, 1979 (age 47)
- Party: Republican
- Education: Tusculum College (BS)
- Website: House website

Eddie Smith (born April 11, 1979) is an American Republican politician who represented District 13 in the Tennessee House of Representatives from January 2014 until his defeat in the November 2018 elections, where he lost to Democrat Gloria Johnson by a 10-point margin.

== Education ==
Smith earned his bachelor of science from Tusculum College in Tusculum, Tennessee.

== Legislation ==
Smith introduced legislation during the 109th General Assembly to increase penalties for school bus drivers who are caught texting and driving. This bill was crafted in the aftermath of a Knox County Schools bus accident that resulted in the death of two young students and a teachers aid.
