= Marsha Blackburn =

Governor-elect of Tennessee

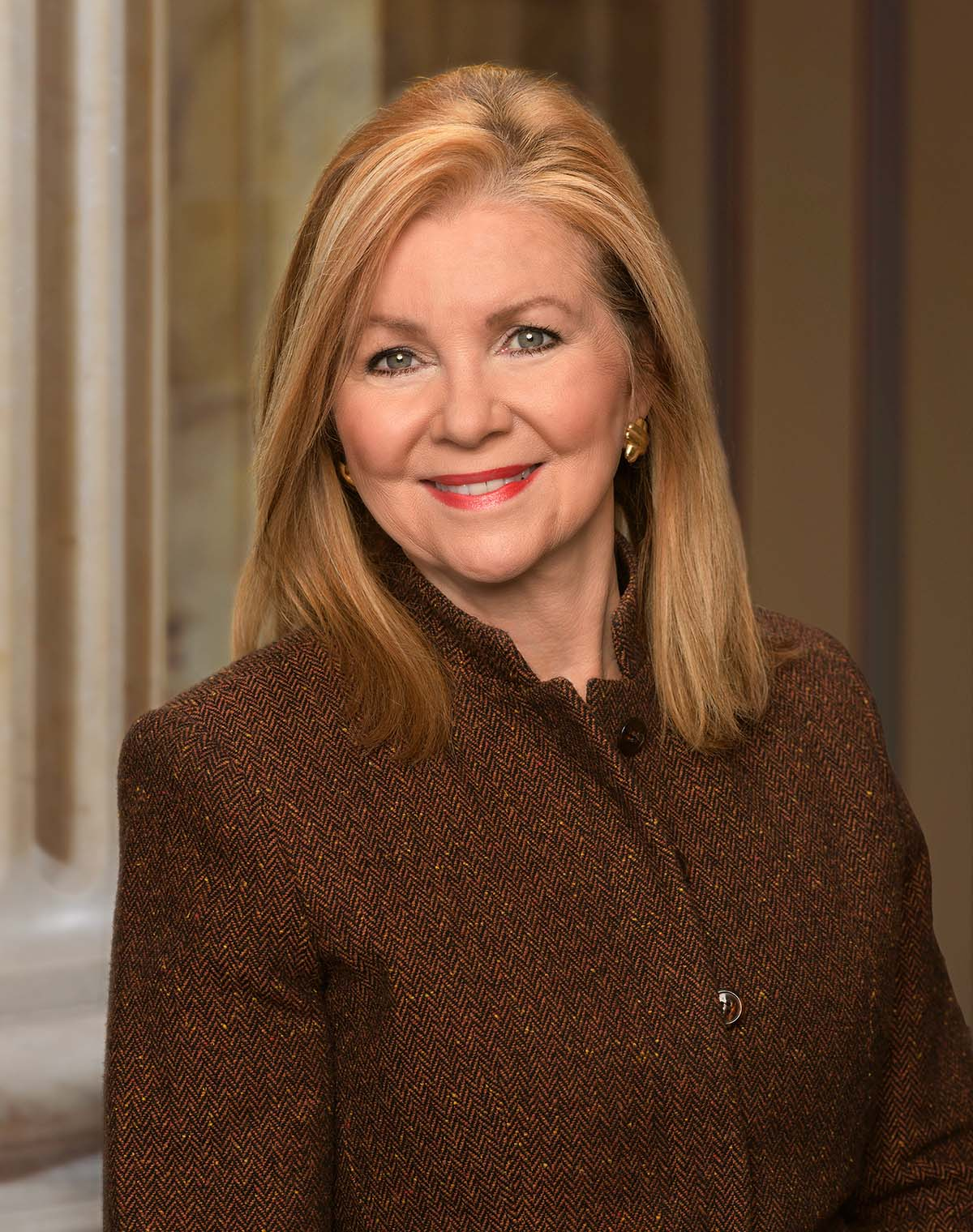
- Official portrait, 2019

Governor-elect of Tennessee
- Assuming office January 16, 2027
- Lieutenant: Jack Johnson
- Succeeding: Bill Lee

United States Senator from Tennessee
- Incumbent
- Assumed office January 3, 2019 Serving with Bill Hagerty
- Preceded by: Bob Corker

Member of the U.S. House of Representatives from Tennessee's 7th district
- In office January 3, 2003 – January 3, 2019
- Preceded by: Ed Bryant
- Succeeded by: Mark Green

Member of the Tennessee Senate from the 23rd district
- In office January 12, 1999 – January 3, 2003
- Preceded by: Keith Jordan
- Succeeded by: Jim Bryson

Executive Director of the Tennessee Film, Entertainment, and Music Commission
- In office February 1995 – June 1997
- Governor: Don Sundquist
- Preceded by: Dancy Jones
- Succeeded by: Anne Pope

Personal details
- Born: Mary Marsha Wedgeworth; June 6, 1952 (age 74) Laurel, Mississippi, U.S.
- Party: Republican
- Spouse: Chuck Blackburn (m. 1974)
- Children: 2
- Education: Mississippi State University (BS)
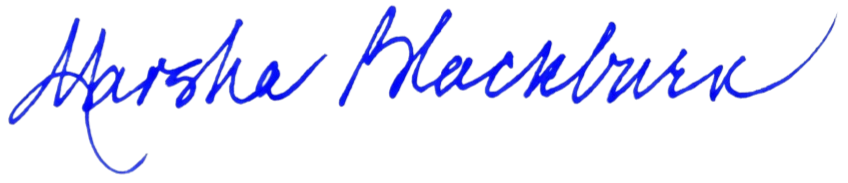
- Signature
- Website: Senate website Campaign website
- Blackburn's voice Blackburn on data privacy concerns in tech regulation Recorded January 20, 2022

Mary Marsha Blackburn (née Wedgeworth; born June 6, 1952) is an American politician and businesswoman who is the governor-elect of Tennessee and the state's senior United States senator, a seat she has held since 2019. A member of the Republican Party, Blackburn was a state senator from 1999 to 2003 and represented Tennessee's 7th congressional district in the United States House of Representatives from 2003 to 2019, during which time the National Journal rated her among the House's most conservative members.

A supporter of the Tea Party movement, Blackburn is a staunch ally of President Donald Trump. She opposes abortion, same-sex marriage, cannabis (medical and recreational), and the Affordable Care Act. On November 6, 2018, Blackburn became the first woman to be elected to the U.S. Senate from Tennessee, defeating Democratic former Tennessee governor Phil Bredesen. Blackburn became the state's senior senator in January 2021 upon the retirement of Senator Lamar Alexander. Upon the retirement of Congressman Jim Cooper in 2023, she became the dean of Tennessee's congressional delegation. She won reelection to a second Senate term in 2024 against Democratic nominee Gloria Johnson.

Blackburn narrowly defeated Memphis city councilor Jerri Green in the 2026 Tennessee gubernatorial election and will assume office as Tennessee's 51st governor on January 16, 2027. She is the first woman elected governor of Tennessee, and the oldest person elected, at 74 years old upon election.

== Early life and education ==
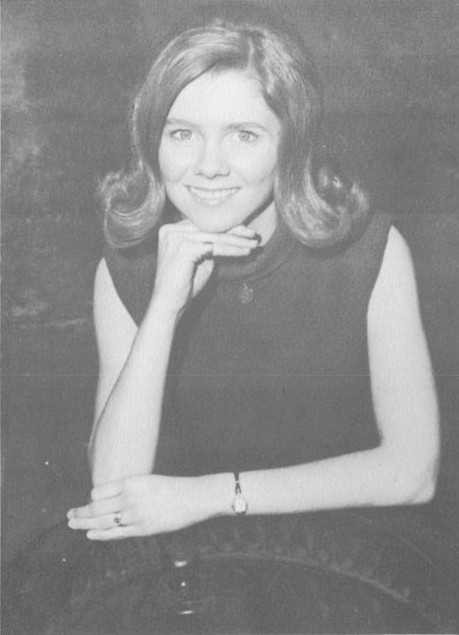
Marsha Wedgeworth as a junior at Northeast Jones High School in 1969

Marsha Wedgeworth was born in Laurel, Mississippi, to Mary Jo (Morgan) and Hilman Wedgeworth, who worked in sales and management. She placed fourth during a beauty pageant in high school.

Blackburn attended Mississippi State University on a 4-H scholarship, earning a Bachelor of Science in home economics in 1974. Blackburn was elected both as secretary and president of the Associated Women Students at Mississippi State University.

== Early career and political activity ==
In 1973, before graduating from college, Blackburn worked as a sales manager for the Times Mirror Company. From 1975 to 1978, she worked in the Castner Knott Division of Mercantile Stores, Inc. In 1978, she became the owner of Marketing Strategies, a promotion-event management firm. As of 2016, Blackburn continued to run this business.

Blackburn was a founding member of the Williamson County Young Republicans. She was chair of the Williamson County Republican Party from 1989 to 1991. In 1992, she ran for Congress in Tennessee's 6th congressional district, losing to incumbent Bart Gordon, and was a delegate to the 1992 Republican National Convention. In 1995, Blackburn was appointed executive director of the Tennessee Film, Entertainment, and Music Commission by Tennessee governor Don Sundquist, holding that post through 1997.

Blackburn was a member of the Tennessee Senate from 1999 to 2003, and rose to be minority whip. In 2000, she took part in the effort to prevent the passage of a state income tax bill.

== U.S. House of Representatives ==
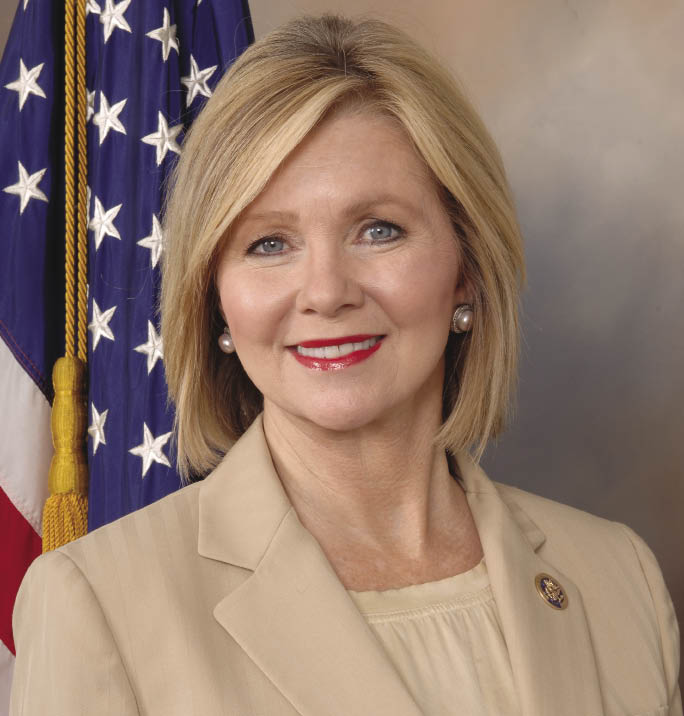
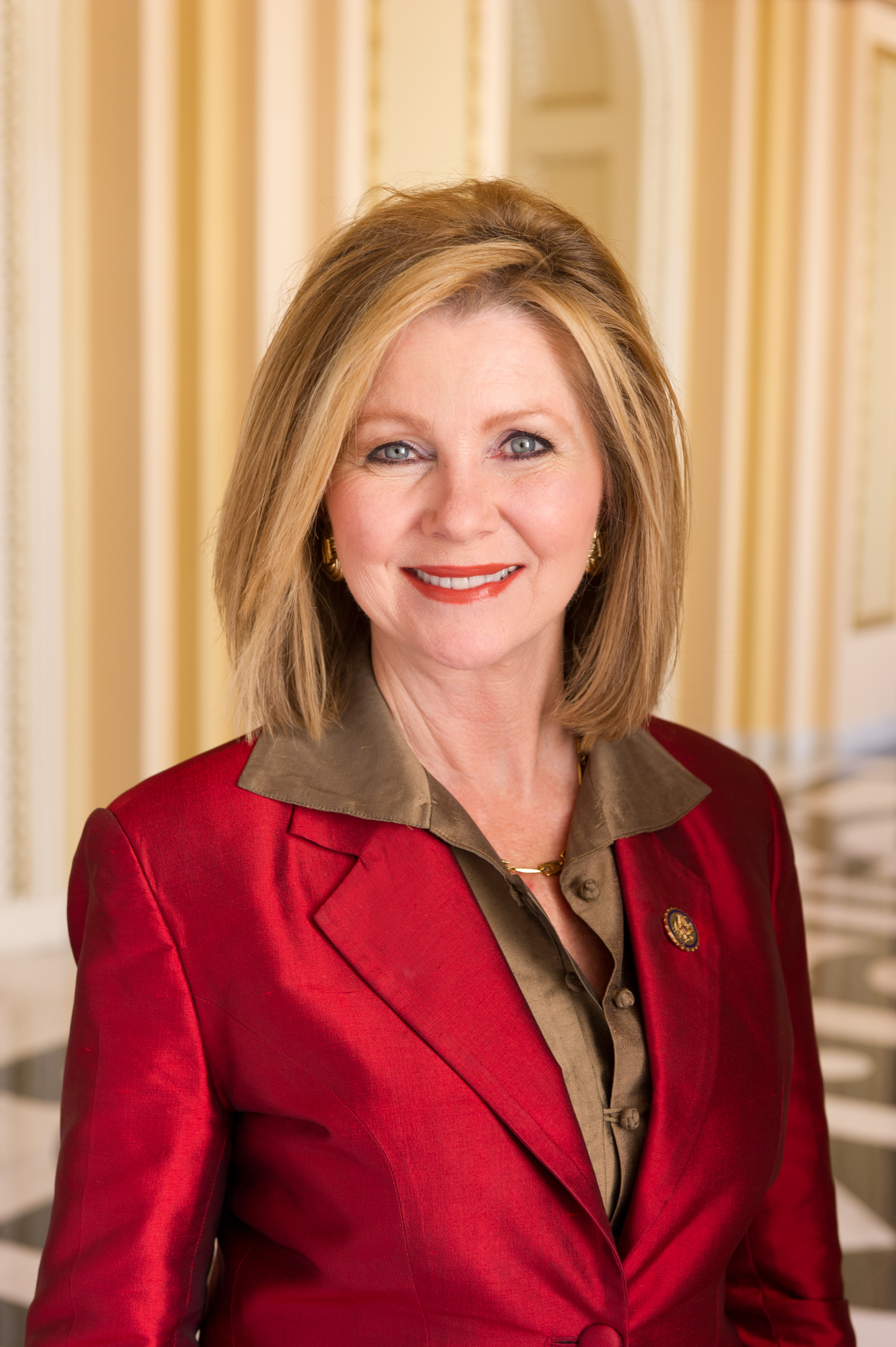
Rep. Blackburn's official portraits, c. 2011 and c. 2016

Redistricting after the 2000 census moved Blackburn's home from the 6th district to the 7th district, and created a gerrymandered district that stretched for 200 miles from eastern Memphis to southwest Nashville. In 2002, Blackburn ran in the Republican primary for this congressional seat. Of the four main candidates, she was the only one from the Nashville suburbs. The other three (Mark Norris, David Kustoff, and Brent Taylor) were all from Memphis or its suburbs. Blackburn was endorsed by the conservative political advocacy group Club for Growth. The three Memphians split the vote in that area, and Blackburn won the primary by nearly 20 percentage points.

In the general election, Blackburn defeated Democratic nominee Tim Barron with 70% of the vote. She was the fourth woman elected to Congress from Tennessee, and the first woman elected to Congress from Tennessee who did not succeed her husband. She was reelected seven times.

=== Tenure ===
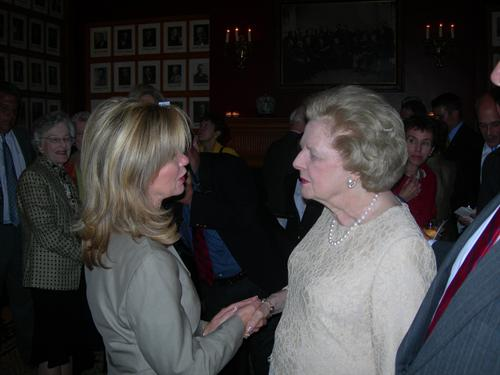
Blackburn with former British Prime Minister Margaret Thatcher in 2007

Blackburn served in the U.S. House of Representatives from 2003 to 2019. During her House tenure, the National Journal rated her among the House's most conservative members.

In November 2007, Blackburn unsuccessfully ran for Republican conference chair. She was a senior advisor on Mitt Romney's 2008 presidential campaign, before resigning her position in the Romney campaign and endorsing Fred Thompson for president. Blackburn was an assistant whip in Congress from 2003 to 2005, as well as deputy whip from 2005.

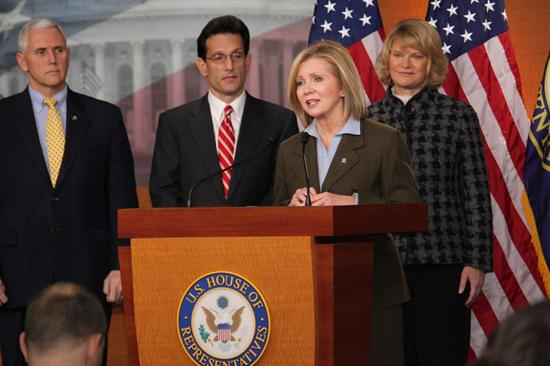
Blackburn with Eric Cantor, Mike Pence, and Cynthia Lummis at a press conference in 2010

Committee assignments

- Committee on the Budget
- Committee on Education and the Workforce
- Committee on Energy and Commerce
  - Subcommittee on Commerce, Manufacturing and Trade, vice-chair
  - Subcommittee on Communications and the Internet, chair
  - Subcommittee on Health Care
  - Subcommittee on Oversight and Investigations, vice-chair – Commerce, Manufacturing, and Trade
- Committee on Judiciary
- Committee on Oversight and Government Reform
- Select Investigative Panel on Planned Parenthood, chair

== U.S. Senate ==
=== 2018 election ===
Final results by county in 2018: Marsha Blackburn: 70–80%; 60–70%; 50–60%; 40–50%; Phil Bredesen: 70–80%; 60–70%; 50–60%

In October 2017, Blackburn announced her candidacy for the Senate seat being vacated by Bob Corker. In her announcement, she said House Republicans were frustrated with Senate Republicans, who they believed acted like Democrats on important issues, including Obamacare. In the announcement, Blackburn called herself a "politically incorrect" "hardcore, card-carrying Tennessee conservative" and said with pride that liberals had called her a "wingnut". She dismissed compromise and bipartisanship, saying, "No compromise, no apologies." She also said she carried a gun in her purse. On August 2, Blackburn won the Republican primary with 84.48% of the vote.

Blackburn largely backed President Donald Trump's policies, including a U.S.–Mexico border wall, and shared his opinion of National Football League national anthem protests. Trump and Vice President Mike Pence endorsed her. During the campaign, Blackburn pledged to support Trump's agenda and suggested that Democratic nominee Phil Bredesen would not.

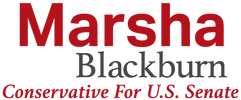
Blackburn's congressional campaign logo, used during the 2018 election

For most of the campaign, polls showed the two candidates nearly tied. But after Brett Kavanaugh's Supreme Court confirmation hearings, Blackburn pulled ahead. Some believe the hearings mobilized Republican voters in the state, even though Democrats won the House. In October 2018, pop star Taylor Swift endorsed the Democratic nominee in an Instagram post, saying she "cannot support Marsha Blackburn". The post was seen as having the potential to boost younger voter turnout, who historically skew Democratic. Blackburn won the election with 54.7% of the vote to Bredesen's 43.9%, an unexpectedly large margin. She carried all but three counties in the state (Davidson, Shelby, and Haywood), the most counties ever won in an open Senate election in Tennessee.

At 66, Blackburn is the oldest elected freshman U.S. senator from Tennessee. She was the oldest person to become a freshman U.S. senator in the 21st century until John Hickenlooper of Colorado surpassed her at age 68 in 2020.

=== 2024 election ===
Final results by county in 2024: Marsha Blackburn: 80–90% 70–80%; 60–70%; 50–60%; Gloria Johnson: 60–70%; 50–60%

On August 1, 2024, Blackburn and Democratic state representative Gloria Johnson won their respective party nominations. This was the first all-woman general election for a Tennessee Senate seat.

Blackburn was reelected with 63.8% of the vote to Johnson's 34.2%. She carried all but two counties in the state (Davidson and Shelby).

There was speculation that Blackburn could be Donald Trump's running mate in his 2024 presidential campaign, but Trump instead chose JD Vance.

=== Senate tenure ===
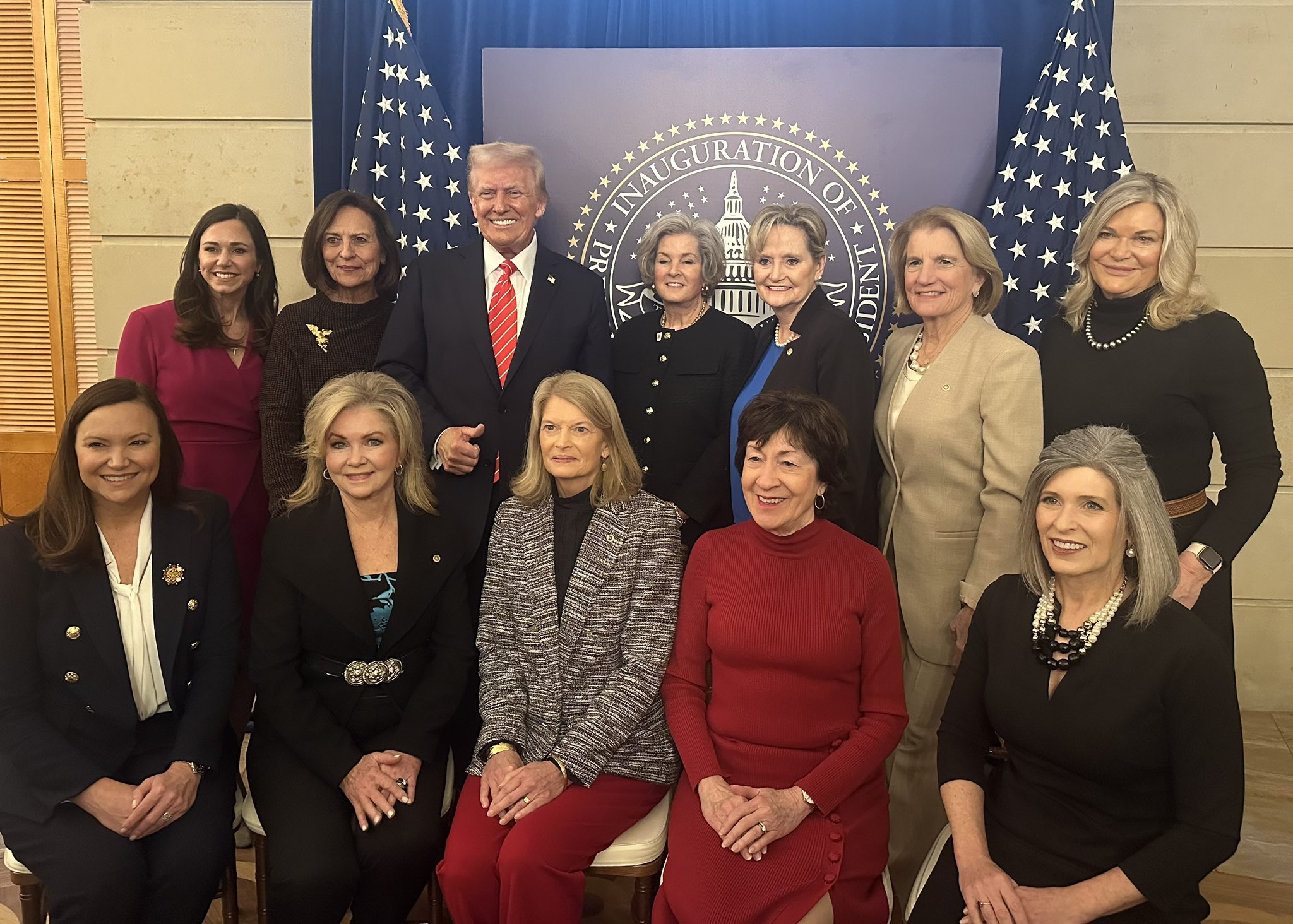
Blackburn with President Donald Trump, Susie Wiles, and fellow female Republican senators, January 2025

Blackburn was sworn in as a U.S. senator on January 3, 2019. She is the first woman in history to represent Tennessee in the U.S. Senate. Upon Lamar Alexander's retirement in 2021, Blackburn became the senior U.S. senator from Tennessee.

Early in her Senate career, Blackburn emphasized conservative priorities including judicial confirmation, border security, and traditional social values. She supported the confirmation of conservative judicial nominees and voted against the confirmation of Ketanji Brown Jackson to the Supreme Court in 2022.

Blackburn has also focused on legislation related to online safety and technology policy. She introduced and supported the REPORT Act (Revising Existing Procedures On Reporting via Technology Act), a federal law enacted in 2024 that expanded reporting obligations for online service providers about suspected child sexual abuse and other crimes to help protect children online.

In January 2025, Blackburn celebrated the signing of the Women's Suffrage National Monument Location Act, which ensures the Women's Suffrage National Monument will be placed on the National Mall. She highlighted Tennessee's role in ratifying the 19th Amendment and the monument's significance.

Throughout her Senate career, Blackburn has advocated for conservative positions on fiscal, regulatory, and social issues, including border security, opposition to abortion rights, and support for veterans' programs and national defense initiatives.

==== Committee assignments ====
Blackburn's Senate committee assignments are below.

- Committee on Commerce, Science, and Transportation
  - Subcommittee on Communications, Media and Broadband
  - Subcommittee on Consumer Protection, Product Safety and Data Protection (chair)
  - Subcommittee on Oceans, Fisheries, Climate Change and Manufacturing
  - Subcommittee on Tourism, Trade, and Export Promotion
- Committee on Finance
  - Subcommittee on Health Care
  - Subcommittee on Social Security, Pensions, and Family Policy
  - Subcommittee on Taxation and IRS Oversight
- Committee on the Judiciary
  - Subcommittee on Antitrust, Competition Policy and Consumer Rights
  - Subcommittee on Human Rights and the Law (ranking member)
  - Subcommittee on Immigration, Citizenship, and Border Safety
  - Subcommittee on Intellectual Property
  - Subcommittee on Privacy, Technology, and the Law
- Committee on Veterans' Affairs

== 2026 gubernatorial campaign ==
On August 6, 2025, Blackburn announced that she would run for governor of Tennessee in 2026. On August 6, 2026, she became the first woman to win the Republican nomination for governor of Tennessee.

On November 3, Blackburn won the general election, becoming the first woman elected governor of Tennessee and the oldest person elected as such, at 74.

== Political positions ==
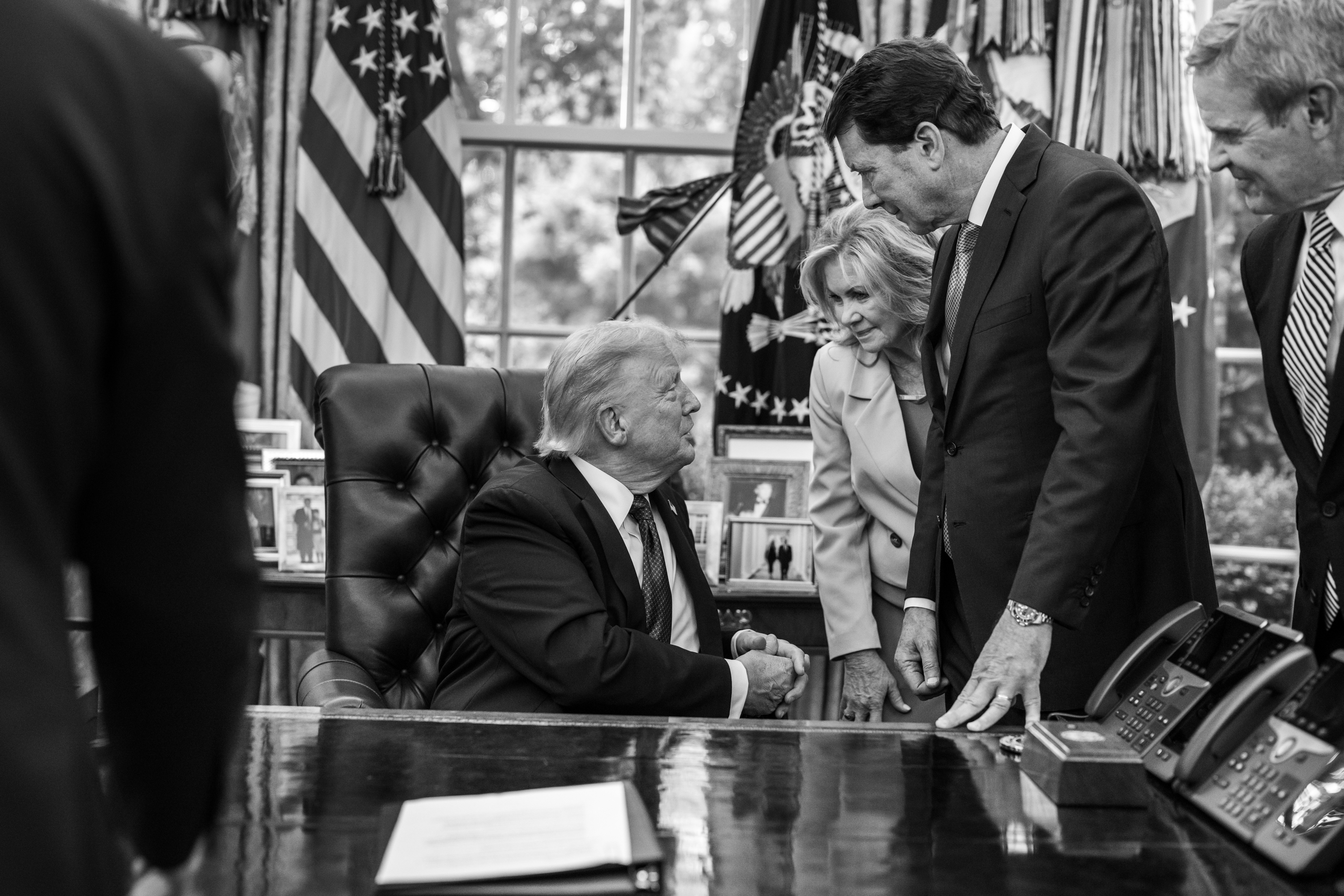
President Donald Trump speaks with Senators Marsha Blackburn and Bill Hagerty after signing a Presidential memorandum to deploy the National Guard to Memphis.

Blackburn is a Tea Party Republican. She has been called staunchly conservative, and has sometimes attended functions of, and met with leaders of, far-right groups. She has called herself "a hard-core, card-carrying Tennessee conservative."

GovTrack estimated Blackburn to be the most ideologically conservative member of the Senate in the 2019 legislative year. In 2024, Blackburn served as chairperson for the Republican National Committee's official party platform.

=== Abortion and stem cell research ===
Blackburn staunchly opposes abortion and sought to overturn Roe v. Wade. In 2013, she was chosen to manage debate on a bill promoted by House Republicans that would have prohibited abortions after 22 weeks' gestation, with limited exceptions for rape or incest. She replaced the bill's prior sponsor, U.S. Representative Trent Franks, after Franks made controversial and dubious statements.

In 2015, Blackburn led a panel that investigated the Planned Parenthood undercover video controversy, in which anti-abortion activists published a video purporting to show that Planned Parenthood illicitly sold fetal tissue. Subsequent investigations into Planned Parenthood found no evidence of fetal tissue sales or of wrongdoing, but in 2017, when Blackburn announced that she was running for Senate, she ran a controversial advertisement saying that she "fought Planned Parenthood and we stopped the sale of baby body parts". In 2015, Blackburn claimed that 94% of Planned Parenthood's business revolves around abortion services, which FactCheck.org found to be misleading and that "no one can say for sure what the percentage is".

In March 2016, Blackburn chaired the Republican-led Select Investigative Panel, a committee convened to "explore the ethical implications of using fetal tissue in biomedical research". Democrats on the panel characterized the probe as a politically motivated witch hunt.

=== Birtherism ===
In 2009, Blackburn sponsored legislation requiring presidential candidates to show their birth certificates. The bill was in response to conspiracy theories, commonly known as "birther" theories, that alleged that Barack Obama was not born in the United States. Her spokesperson said that Blackburn did not doubt that Obama was an American citizen.

=== Afghanistan ===
In August 2021, Blackburn told Maria Bartiromo that the situation in Afghanistan could have been avoided if Biden had followed the plan Trump and Pompeo had put in place: "The steps that Secretary Pompeo and President Trump made were able to send the message, 'If you cross us, there is a price to pay.' But Joe Biden is weak and they are not fearing him." In September, Blackburn accused Biden of lying when he said during an interview that no one advised him against a timeline-based withdrawal, and called for his resignation.

=== China ===
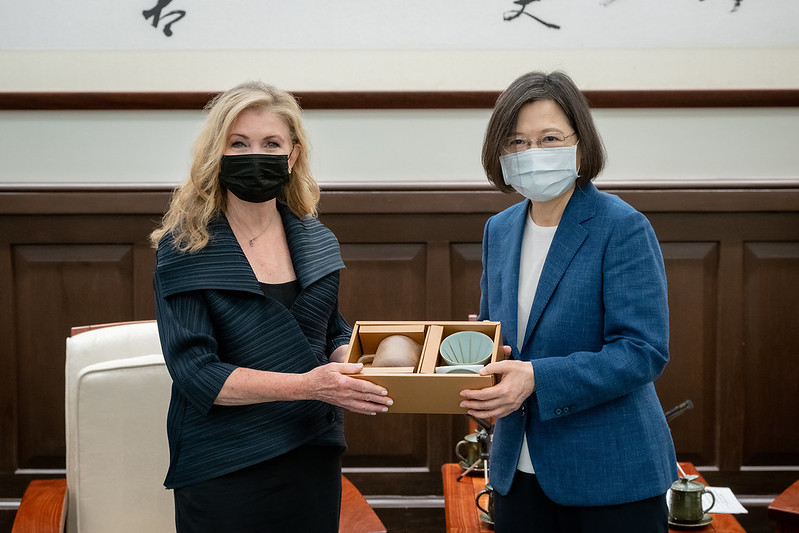
Blackburn meeting with President of Taiwan Tsai Ing-wen in Taipei, August 2022

In December 2020, Blackburn posted, "China has a 5,000-year history of cheating and stealing. Some things will never change..." on her Twitter account. The European Union bureau chief for China's state-owned China Daily, Chen Weihua, responded by tweeting, "This is the most racist and ignorant US Senator I have seen. A lifetime bitch". In what appeared to be a thinly veiled reference to Chen, Blackburn replied that the U.S. would "not bow down to sexist communist thugs". The Chinese American rights group Tennessee Chinese American Alliance protested Blackburn's comments as insulting to the Chinese community.

In August 2022, Blackburn led a congressional delegation to Taiwan, where she met with Taiwanese President Tsai Ing-wen. Her delegation was the third such delegation to visit Taiwan following Speaker Nancy Pelosi's visit early that month. During her visit, Blackburn voiced support for Taiwan, calling it an "independent nation" and a "country", and supported further U.S.-Taiwan relations and combating the "New Axis of Evil", which she defined as Iran, Russia, and North Korea, led by China. China claims Taiwan as part of its territory and condemns most visits by U.S. lawmakers.

In July 2023, Blackburn criticized the movie Barbie for "bending to Beijing to make a quick buck" after it was alleged the film contained a map of the world displaying the nine-dash line, a territorial claim by China to the South China Sea that the international community rejects. In a statement addressing similar criticisms, Warner Bros. said the map was a "child-like crayon drawing ... not intended to make any type of statement".

In 2024, the Chinese government's Spamouflage influence operation targeted Blackburn.

=== Iran ===
Blackburn supported the Trump administration rescinding the Joint Comprehensive Plan of Action, calling Iran "a terrorist state whose desire to destroy Israel and undermine the security of the U.S. is well known."

In 2024, Blackburn called for retaliatory strikes after Iran launched drone and cruise missile attacks on Israel.

In February 2026, after Trump launched Operation Epic Fury, Blackburn said, "The Iranian regime has chanted 'Death to America' for decades. It's time to end the reign of terror."

=== Israel ===
In October 2023, Blackburn voiced support for Israel during the Gaza war, saying, "The United States has a moral obligation to defend Israel, and as Israel is surrounded by hostile actors funded by Iran who seek the destruction of the Jewish state and deny its right to exist, that's a solemn responsibility."

=== Climate change ===
Blackburn rejects the scientific consensus on climate change. In a 2014 debate with science communicator Bill Nye, Blackburn rejected the science and urgency of the issue, claiming that there is "no consensus" in the scientific community about the causes of climate change.

=== Capital punishment ===
Blackburn is a proponent of capital punishment, and has campaigned on bringing back the electric chair as a form of execution in Tennessee. After the botched execution of Christa Pike on September 30, 2026, Blackburn wrote in a statement: "Now, this botched process is extending the pain for the family of Colleen Slemmer. While there should be a thorough review of what happened and why the process failed, the answer is simple: bring back the electric chair and deliver justice for these victims swiftly. As your governor, I will do just that."

=== Contraception and the right to privacy ===
In March 2022, Blackburn called Griswold v. Connecticut, a landmark 1965 Supreme Court decision holding that the Constitution protects the liberty of married couples to buy and use contraceptives without government restriction, "constitutionally unsound" as a ruling that "gave the court permission to bypass our system of checks and balances".

=== Donald Trump ===
Blackburn strongly supports Donald Trump.

In November 2016, Blackburn joined Trump's presidential transition team as vice chair. She was a staunch supporter of his and backed most of his policies and proposals. She nominated him for a Nobel Peace Prize for his negotiations with North Korea. Vox speculated that Blackburn's ties to Trump, who won Tennessee in the 2016 election by 26 points, helped boost her Senate candidacy.

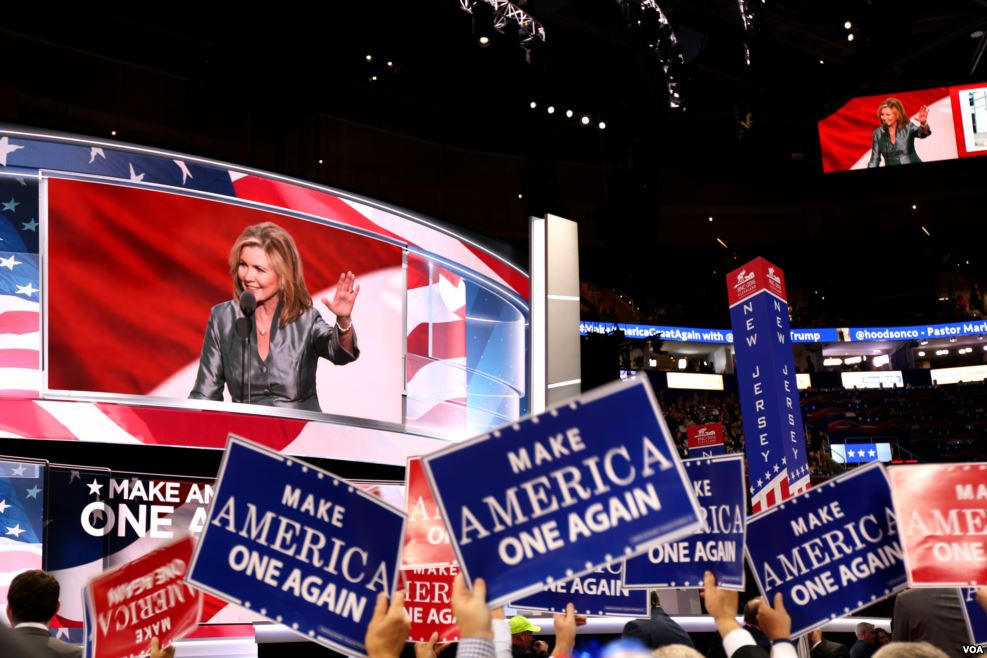
Blackburn speaking at the Republican National Convention in 2016

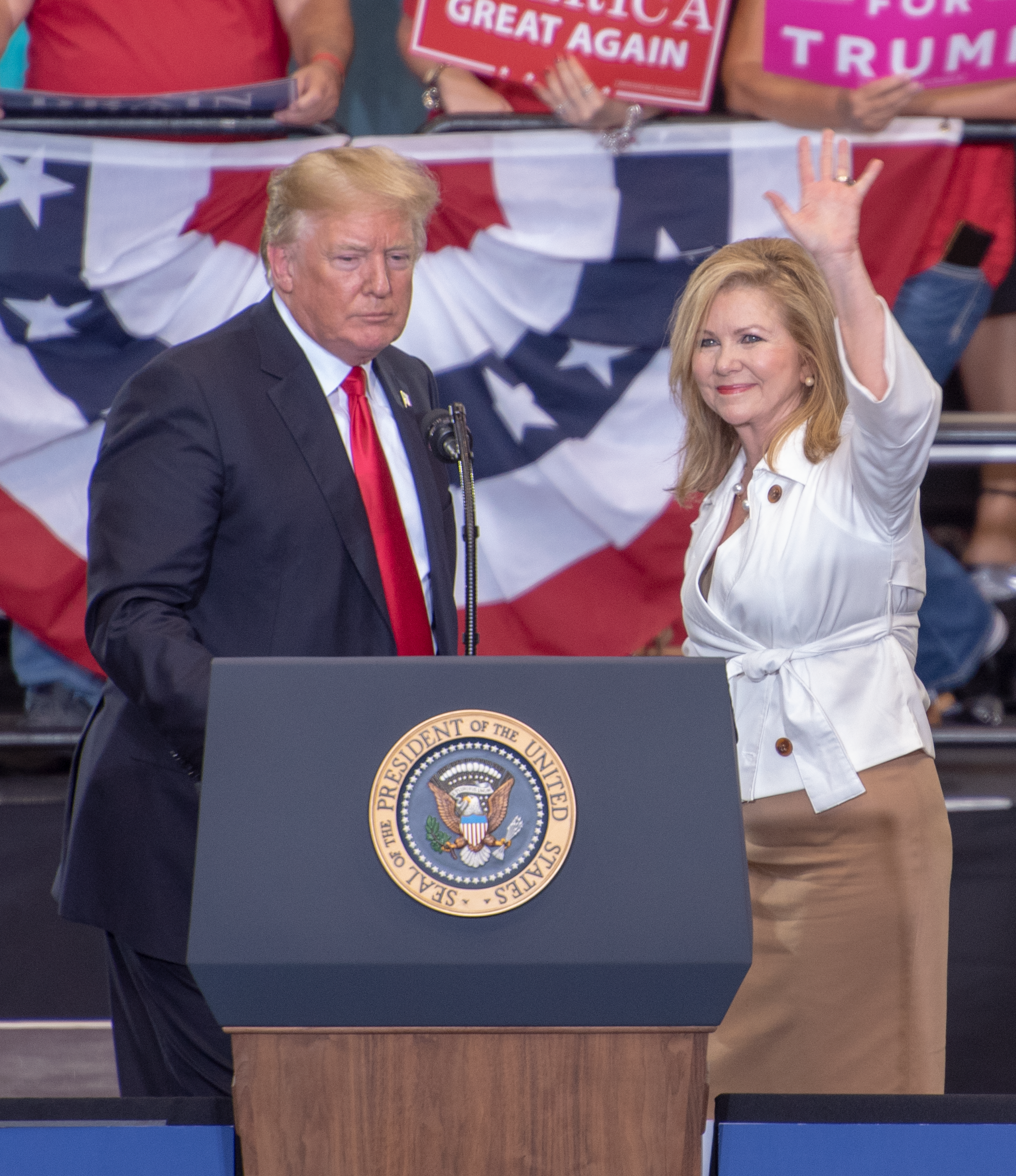
Blackburn and President Donald Trump waving at Nashville Rally in 2018

During Trump's first Senate impeachment trial, Blackburn left the chamber for a television interview. She also garnered attention by reading a book during the proceedings. Blackburn tweeted about Alex Vindman during the trial, calling him unpatriotic for allegedly "badmouth[ing] and ridicul[ing]" the U.S. in front of Russia. In November 2019, #MoscowMarcia started trending on Twitter after Blackburn tweeted allegations against Vindman on her Twitter account. The Week called her tweet a "conspiratorial smear". In her post, she wrote "Vindictive Vindman is the 'whistleblower's' handler."

After Biden won the 2020 United States presidential election, Blackburn supported Trump's false claims of victory and raised funds to support the Trump campaign's effort to overturn the election results in court. In an interview on November 20, she briefly called Biden the "president-elect" but later retracted this as a mistake. On January 2, 2021, Blackburn and 10 other Republican senators announced that they would vote to oppose certification of the results of the election on January 6, the joint session of Congress in which the certification of a presidential election occurs, citing false allegations of widespread election fraud, irregularities, and unconstitutional changes to voting laws and voting restrictions. After a mob of Trump supporters violently stormed Capitol Hill that day, she voted to certify the results of the election.

In May 2021, Blackburn abstained from voting on the creation of the January 6 commission.

=== Education ===
In 2021, when President Biden proposed universal pre-K for 3- and 4-year-olds and subsidized child care for low- and middle-income families, Blackburn likened the proposal to the communist policies of the Soviet Union. She also falsely claimed that the Biden administration proposed to put children in pre-K even if their parents did not want to send them there.

=== Fiscal policy ===
Blackburn was among the 31 Senate Republicans who voted against final passage of the Fiscal Responsibility Act of 2023, which raised the U.S. debt ceiling, ending the 2023 United States debt-ceiling crisis.

=== Gun rights ===
After the 2018 Thousand Oaks shooting on November 7, 2018, which resulted in 12 deaths, Blackburn responded to a question about the shooting in a Fox News interview by saying, "how do we make certain that we protect the Second Amendment and protect our citizens? We've always done that in this country. Mental health issues need to be addressed."

In March 2023, California Governor Gavin Newsom criticized Blackburn for accepting over $1 million in campaign donations from the National Rifle Association of America and voting against gun control measures, including the Bipartisan Safer Communities Act, which passed in 2022.

=== Health care and pharmaceuticals ===
Blackburn opposed the Affordable Care Act (also known as Obamacare), saying upon its passage, "freedom dies a little bit today." She supported efforts to repeal the legislation. In 2017, while arguing for its repeal, Blackburn falsely said that two of its popular provisions (protections for people with preexisting conditions and allowing adult children to be on their parents' health plans until they're 26) "were two Republican provisions which made it into the bill." In her declaration that she would run for the Senate in 2018, she said that the failure to repeal the ACA was "a disgrace".

At October 2013 congressional hearings on the ACA, Blackburn said the website healthcare.gov violated HIPAA and health information privacy rights. The next day, when a CNN interviewer pointed out that the only health-related question the site asked was "do you smoke?", Blackburn repeated her criticism of the site for violating privacy rights.

According to The New York Times in 2017, Blackburn's best-known legislation was her co-sponsorship of a bill that revised the legal standard the Drug Enforcement Administration (DEA) had used to establish that "a significant and present risk of death or serious bodily harm that is more likely than not to occur", rather than the previous standard of "imminent danger", before suspending the manufacturer's opioid drug shipments. The legislation passed the House and the Senate unanimously, but was criticized in internal Justice Department documents and by the DEA's chief administrative law judge as hampering DEA enforcement actions against drug distribution companies engaging in black-market sales. Joe Rannazzisi, who had led the DEA's Office of Diversion Control, said he told Blackburn's staffers what the effects of a 2016 law she co-sponsored would be. Blackburn said her bill had "unintended consequences", but Rannazzisi said they should have been anticipated. He said that during a July 2014 conference call he told congressional staffers the bill would cause more difficulties for the DEA if it pursued corporations that were illegally distributing such drugs. Blackburn and Representative Tom Marino, the main co-sponsor of her House bill, sent a letter requesting an Office of Inspector General investigation into Rannazzisi, saying he tried to intimidate Congress in the July conversation. Rannazzisi said he was removed from his DEA position in August 2015.

=== Immigration ===
Blackburn supported Trump's 2017 executive order imposing a temporary travel and immigration ban barring citizens of seven Muslim-majority countries from entering the U.S. She has often expressed support of Trump's immigration policy, especially his plan to greatly expand the Mexico–United States barrier. In March 2021, Blackburn visited the southern border of the United States with several other Republican senators; she accused President Biden of encouraging a surge of illegal immigration.

=== LGBT rights ===
Blackburn opposes same-sex marriage and in 2004 and 2006 voted for proposed constitutional amendments to ban it. Of the Supreme Court's 2015 decision in Obergefell v. Hodges, Blackburn said, "Despite this decision, no one can overrule the truth about what marriage actually is—a sacred institution between a man and a woman." In 2010, she voted against repealing the military's Don't Ask, Don't Tell policy.

During her tenure as a representative, Blackburn sought to remove Kevin Jennings, a gay man who worked in the United States Department of Education, saying that Jennings "has played an integral role in promoting homosexuality and pushing a pro-homosexual agenda in America's schools."

In 2013, Blackburn voted to reauthorize the Violence Against Women Act in the House, but voted against the Senate's version of the act, which expanded VAWA to apply to people regardless of sexual orientation. She argued that increasing the number of targets for VAWA funding would "dilute the money that needs to go into the sexual assault centers, domestic abuse centers, [and] child advocacy centers", and said VAWA ought to remain focused on supporting women's shelters and facilitating law enforcement against crimes against women, rather than addressing other groups or issues.

Blackburn voted against the Employment Non-Discrimination Act to ban discrimination against LGBT employees. In August 2019, she co-signed an amicus brief to the U.S. Supreme Court arguing that Title VII of the Civil Rights Act of 1964 does not prohibit employment discrimination based upon sexual orientation or gender identity.

On July 28, 2026, Blackburn introduced a bill that proposes amending the Daughters of the American Revolution's federal charter to require that members be "biological women", therefore potentially barring transgender women from membership.

=== Supreme Court nominations ===
On October 26, 2020, Blackburn voted to confirm Amy Coney Barrett to the Supreme Court of the United States. Barrett was confirmed by a vote of 52–48. Blackburn wore a mask that read "Grin and Barrett" to the Senate vote.

On March 22, 2022, during the confirmation hearings for Supreme Court nominee Ketanji Brown Jackson, Blackburn asked Jackson to define the word "woman". Jackson declined, saying she was "not a biologist". On April 7, 2022, Blackburn voted against Jackson's confirmation; the Senate voted 53–47 to confirm Jackson.

=== Tech policy and antitrust ===
Blackburn has advocated increased regulation of technology companies and criticized alleged anti-conservative bias on major platforms. In June 2018, she published an op-ed arguing for greater oversight and restrictions on tech companies that sparked a vocal backlash among Google employees. During a 2020 Commerce Committee hearing in which she claimed that tech companies stifle free speech, Blackburn asked Google chief Sundar Pichai about the employment status of an employee who had criticized her.

In the 117th Congress, Blackburn introduced the bipartisan Open App Markets Act alongside Senators Richard Blumenthal and Amy Klobuchar. The legislation was intended to curb Apple and Google, the operators of the App Store and Google Play, from engaging in anti-competitive behavior in app markets. Blackburn also worked with Blumenthal to introduce children's online child safety legislation, known as the Kids Online Safety Act (KOSA).

=== Telecommunications policy ===
Blackburn opposes net neutrality in the United States, calling it "socialistic". She opposes municipal broadband initiatives that aim to compete with Internet service providers. She supported bills that restrict municipalities from creating their own broadband networks, and wrote a bill to prevent the Federal Communications Commission (FCC) from preempting state laws that blocked municipal broadband.

In 2017, Blackburn introduced to the House a measure to dismantle an Obama-administration online privacy rule that the FCC adopted in October 2016. Her measure, which was supported by broadband providers but criticized by privacy advocates, repealed the rule that required broadband providers to obtain consumers' permission before sharing their online data, including browsing histories. The measure passed the House in a party-line vote in March 2017, after a similar measure passed the Senate the same week. She subsequently proposed legislation that expanded the requirement to include internet companies as well as broadband providers. As of 2017, Blackburn had accepted at least $693,000 in campaign contributions from telecom companies.

=== Women's rights ===
In 2009, Blackburn voted against the Lilly Ledbetter Fair Pay Act and the Paycheck Fairness Act.

== Personal life ==
Marsha married Chuck Blackburn in 1974. They live in Brentwood, a suburb of Nashville in Williamson County, and have two children. She is a Presbyterian and a member of Christ Presbyterian Church.

Blackburn is a member of The C Street Family, a prayer group that includes members of Congress. She is a former member of the Smithsonian Libraries Advisory Board.

Blackburn is the author of The Mind of a Conservative Woman: Seeking the Best for Family and Country. The book was published on September 1, 2020, by Worthy Books.

== Electoral history ==
Tennessee's 6th congressional district: 1992 results (Note: Write-in and minor candidate notes: In 1992, write-ins received 10 votes.)
| Year | Democratic | Votes | Pct | Republican | Votes | Pct | 3rd Party | Party | Votes | Pct |
|---|---|---|---|---|---|---|---|---|---|---|
| 1992 | Bart Gordon (incumbent) | 120,177 | 57% | Marsha Blackburn | 86,289 | 41% | H. Scott Benson | Independent | 5,952 | 3% |

Tennessee's 7th congressional district: Results 2002–2016
| Year | | Democratic | Votes | Pct | Republican | Votes | Pct | 3rd Party | Party | Votes | Pct |
|---|---|---|---|---|---|---|---|---|---|---|---|
| 2002 | (Note: Write-in and minor candidate notes: In 2002, write-ins received 31 votes.) | Tim Barron | 51,790 | 26% | Marsha Blackburn | 138,314 | 71% | Rick Patterson | Independent | 5,423 | 3% |
| 2004 | | (no candidate) | | | Marsha Blackburn (incumbent) | 232,404 | 100% | | | | |
| 2006 | (Note: Write-in and minor candidate notes: In 2006, James B. "Mickey" White received 898 votes; William J. Smith received 848 votes; John L. Rimer received 710 votes, and Gayl G. Pratt received 663 votes.) | Bill Morrison | 73,369 | 32% | Marsha Blackburn (incumbent) | 152,288 | 66% | Kathleen A. Culver | Independent | 1,806 | 1% |
| 2008 | | Randy Morris | 98,207 | 31% | Marsha Blackburn (incumbent) | 214,214 | 69% | | | | |
| 2010 | | Greg Rabidoux | 54,341 | 25% | Marsha Blackburn (incumbent) | 158,892 | 72% | J.W. Stone | Independent | 6,319 | 3% |
| 2012 | | Credo Amouzouvik | 61,050 | 24% | Marsha Blackburn (incumbent) | 180,775 | 71% | Howard Switzer | Green | 4,584 | 2% |
| 2014 | | Daniel Cramer | 42,280 | 26.8% | Marsha Blackburn (incumbent) | 110,534 | 69.9% | Leonard Ladner | Independent | 5,093 | 3.2% |
| 2016 | | Tharon Chandler | 65,226 | 23.5% | Marsha Blackburn (incumbent) | 200,407 | 72.2% | Leonard Ladner | Independent | 11,880 | 4.3% |

2018 United States Senate election in Tennessee
| Party | Candidate | Votes | % | ±% |
|---|---|---|---|---|
| Republican | Marsha Blackburn | 1,227,483 | 54.71% | −10.18% |
| Democratic | Phil Bredesen | 985,450 | 43.92% | +13.51% |
| Independent | Trudy Austin | 9,455 | 0.42% | N/A |
| Independent | Dean Hill | 8,717 | 0.39% | N/A |
| Independent | Kris L. Todd | 5,084 | 0.23% | N/A |
| Independent | John Carico | 3,398 | 0.15% | N/A |
| Independent | Breton Phillips | 2,226 | 0.10% | N/A |
| Independent | Kevin Lee McCants | 1,927 | 0.09% | N/A |
| Total votes | | 2,243,740 | 100.00% | N/A |
| Republican hold | | | | |

2024 United States Senate election in Tennessee
| Party | Candidate | Votes | % | ±% |
|---|---|---|---|---|
| Republican | Marsha Blackburn (incumbent) | 1,918,743 | 63.80% | +9.09% |
| Democratic | Gloria Johnson | 1,027,461 | 34.16% | −9.76% |
| Independent | Tharon Chandler | 28,444 | 0.95% | N/A |
| Independent | Pamela Moses | 24,682 | 0.82% | N/A |
| Independent | Hastina Robinson | 8,278 | 0.28% | N/A |
| Total votes | | 3,007,608 | 100.00% | |

== See also ==
- List of female governors in the United States
- Women in the United States House of Representatives
- Women in the United States Senate

== Notes ==
U.S. House of Representatives
| Preceded by Ed Bryant | Member of the U.S. House of Representatives from Tennessee's 7th congressional district 2003–2019 | Succeeded by Mark Green |
Party political offices
| Preceded by Bob Corker | Republican nominee for U.S. Senator from Tennessee (Class 1); 2018, 2024 | Most recent |
| Preceded by Bill Lee | Republican nominee for Governor of Tennessee; 2026 | Most recent |
U.S. Senate
| Preceded by Bob Corker | U.S. Senator (Class 1) from Tennessee; 2019–present Served alongside: Lamar Alexander, Bill Hagerty | Incumbent |
Political offices
| Preceded by Bill Lee | Governor of Tennessee; Taking office 2027 | Elect |
U.S. order of precedence (ceremonial)
| Preceded by Cindy Hyde-Smith | Order of precedence of the United States as United States Senator | Succeeded by Josh Hawley |
| Preceded by Cindy Hyde-Smith | United States senators by seniority 64th | Succeeded by Kevin Cramer |
