= Harry J. Tindell =

American politician (born 1960)

Member of the Tennessee House of Representatives from the 13th district
- In office January 8, 1991 – January 8, 2013
- Preceded by: Ted Ray Miller
- Succeeded by: Gloria Johnson

Personal details
- Born: October 30, 1960 (age 66)
- Party: Democratic
- Education: University of Tennessee (BS)
- Website: House website

Harry J. Tindell (born October 30, 1960) is a Tennessee politician and a member of the Tennessee House of Representatives for the 13th district, which encompasses part of Knox County.

== Biography ==
Tindell began his tenure as a state representative during the 97th General Assembly and was most recently re-elected as a member of the Democratic Party. He is the Chair of the House Budget Subcommittee and is a member of the House State and Local Government Committee, the House Local Government Subcommittee, the House State Government Subcommittee, the Joint Pensions and Insurance Committee, the Joint Lottery Oversight Committee, the Joint Tennessee Education Lottery Corp. Committee, and the House Finance, Ways and Means Committee. Harry Tindell graduated from Fulton High School and possesses a Bachelor of Science degree in business from the University of Tennessee at Knoxville.

In 2005, when the House of Representatives voted on whether or not to hold a referendum on writing into the state constitution an amendment banning gay marriage, Harry Tindell was one of only seven members of the House voting against the measure. In April 2006, when a bill passed the House Budget Subcommittee that would raise the minimum wage from $5.15 to $6.15, Tindell commented, "It's the right thing to do." He is the son of Knox County Clerk Billy Tindell.
