= Torrey Harris =

American politician (born 1991)

Member of the Tennessee House of Representatives
- Incumbent
- Assumed office January 12, 2021
- Preceded by: John DeBerry
- Constituency: 90th district (2021–2023); 91st district (2023–present)

Personal details
- Born: March 12, 1991 (age 35)
- Party: Democratic
- Education: Christian Brothers University (BA)
- Website: House website

Torrey C. Harris (born March 12, 1991) is an American politician serving as a member of the Tennessee House of Representatives from the 91st district. Originally elected to represent the 90th district in 2020, he assumed office on January 12, 2021.

Harris is the first openly bisexual member of the Tennessee House, and one of the first two openly LGBTQ representatives.

== Early life and education ==
Torrey C. Harris was born on March 12, 1991. Until he was 19, he lived in Hope, Arkansas, where he was raised by his mother and grandmother. After high school, he attended Christian Brothers University in Memphis. There, he became a member of Alpha Phi Alpha and graduated with a BA in applied psychology, with an emphasis in industrial and organizational psychology. After graduating, he began working at LeMoyne–Owen College as Chief Officer of Corporate, Foundations, and Major Gifts.

== Tennessee House of Representatives (2021–present) ==
=== Elections ===
In 2018, Harris challenged longtime representative John DeBerry in the Democratic primary for the 90th district of the Tennessee House of Representatives. DeBerry easily defeated Harris before winning re-election.

In 2020, DeBerry was ousted from the Tennessee Democratic Party after repeatedly siding with Republicans, including by his support for school vouchers and opposition to abortion. Harris again ran for the Democratic nomination for the seat, while DeBerry filed to run as an independent. This time, Harris won the Democratic nomination, and he defeated DeBerry by a wide margin. This made Harris the state's youngest representative, first openly bisexual elected representative, and, alongside Eddie Mannis, one of the first two openly LGBTQ representatives.

In 2022, new redistricting maps eliminated Harris' district and placed him into the 91st state house district represented by London Lamar. The new maps led to an intra-party conflict when the pair approached fellow representative Barbara Cooper and suggested she ought to retire due to her age so that Harris and Lamar could avoid running against one another. Cooper deemed the suggestion "just disrespectful," and Shelby County caucus chair Joe Towns criticized the pair by saying Cooper had "more wisdom in her little finger than most of them have in their whole body." The next month, Katrina Robinson was expelled from the state senate. Though Robinson endorsed Harris for the position, the Shelby County Commission selected Lamar to complete Robinson's term. However, Harris easily won re-election in Lamar's now-vacant house district.

=== Tenure ===
In 2025, in the midst of the Gaza war, Harris filed a request to create a Palestinian Caucus in the Tennessee legislature. Republican leadership quickly rejected the proposal. Later that year, he filed bills to match election dates for school board members to those of county commissions and to allow recall elections of county officials. The bills primarily drew support from the Republican majority, with most Democratic legislators opposed.

In 2026, Harris fell under FBI investigation for running a potentially fraudulent PAC to fundraise on behalf of former vice president Kamala Harris.

== Personal life ==
Harris is a Christian.

=== Theft and assault charges ===
In 2022, Harris went to the apartment of an ex-partner to return a dog. While at the apartment, an altercation occurred in which the ex-partner claimed Harris allegedly "bear-hugged" him and scratched his arm in an attempt to stop him from leaving the apartment. By the time the man returned to the apartment with officers, Harris had left with the dog, a couple of electronics, and other items he previously bought as gifts. Harris was arrested for theft and domestic assault. He later released a statement in which he denied wrongdoing, agreed to cooperate with authorities, and promised to plead not guilty to the offenses.
