= 2026 Shelby County, Tennessee mayoral election =

2026 Shelby County mayoral election
- August 6, 2026

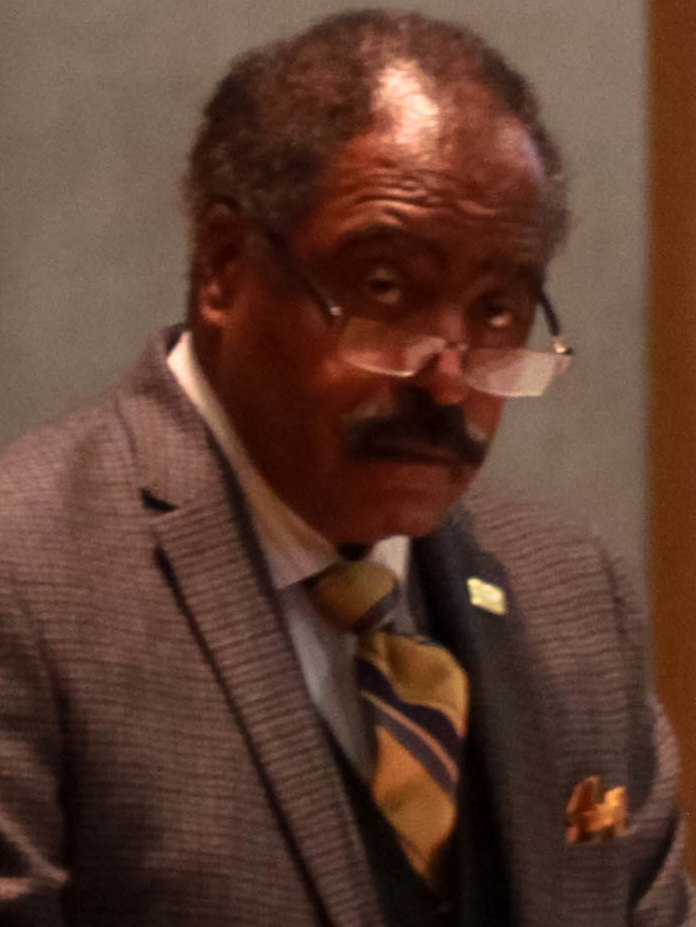
Nominee	Mickell Lowery	John DeBerry
Party	Democratic	Republican
Popular vote	84,250	43,487
Percentage	65.96%	34.04%
Mayor before election
Lee Harris
Democratic
Elected mayor
Mickell Lowery
Democratic

The 2026 Shelby County mayoral election was held on August 6, 2026, to determine the mayor of Shelby County, Tennessee. The election was held concurrently with primary elections for various state office primaries. Incumbent Democratic mayor Lee Harris, first elected in 2018, is term-limited and cannot seek a third term.

== Democratic primary ==
In February 2026, the Shelby County Democratic Party announced that the eligibility of several candidates, including former school superintendent Marie Feagins, had been referred to the Tennessee Democratic Party for a final determination on their bona fide status. Under state party bylaws, the TNDP has the authority to remove candidates from the primary ballot if they are found to be in violation of party membership requirements.

=== Nominee ===
- Mickell Lowery, Shelby County commissioner (District 8)

=== Defeated in primary ===
- Melvin Burgess, Shelby County property tax assessor
- Harold Collins, Shelby County chief administrative officer
- Marie Feagins, former school superintendent
- Heidi Kuhn, Shelby County Criminal Court clerk
- Rusty Qualls
- JB Smiley Jr., Memphis City Council member and candidate for governor in 2022

==== Withdrawn ====
- JW Gibson, former Shelby County commissioner and candidate for mayor of Memphis in 2023

== Republican primary ==
=== Nominee ===
- John DeBerry, former Democratic state representative from District 90 (1995–2021)

=== Disqualified ===
- Joe Brown, former county criminal court judge and reality television host

== Independent candidates ==
=== Disqualified ===
- Anthony Warr

== See also ==
- 2026 Tennessee county mayoral elections
- 2026 Tennessee elections
