= Middle Tennessee State University =

Public university in Murfreesboro, Tennessee, U.S.

- Former names: Middle Tennessee State Normal School (1911–1925); Middle Tennessee State Teachers College (1925–1943); Middle Tennessee State College (1943–1965)
- Motto: Agriculture and Commerce
- Type: Public research university
- Established: September 11, 1911; 115 years ago
- Accreditation: SACS
- Academic affiliations: ORAU; Space-grant
- Endowment: $167.7 million (2025)
- President: Sidney A. McPhee
- Faculty: 1,223
- Students: 20,488 (fall 2024)
- Undergraduates: 18,042 (fall 2024)
- Postgraduates: 2,446 (fall 2024)
- Location: Murfreesboro, Tennessee, United States; 35.849°N 86.365°W
- Campus: 500 acres (200 ha); Midsize city
- Colors: Royal blue & white
- Nickname: Blue Raiders
- Sporting affiliations: NCAA Division I FBS – CUSA
- Mascot: Lightning
- Website: www.mtsu.edu

Middle Tennessee State University (MTSU or MT) is a public research university in Murfreesboro, Tennessee, United States. Founded in 1911 as a normal school, the university consists of eight undergraduate colleges as well as a college of graduate studies, together offering more than 300 degree programs through more than 35 departments. It is classified among "R2: Universities".

Prior to 2017, MTSU was governed by the Tennessee Board of Regents and part of the State University and Community College System of Tennessee. In 2017, governance was transferred to an institutional board of trustees. MTSU is accredited by the Southern Association of Colleges and Schools Commission on Colleges. MTSU athletics programs compete intercollegiately as the Blue Raiders in the NCAA Division I as a member of Conference USA.

== History ==
One of the earliest calls for a normal school occurred in 1855 when a Wilson County, Tennessee, politician sought to build a normal school in Lebanon, Tennessee. Education efforts collapsed shortly after the breakout of the American Civil War. Later, state superintendents and teachers traveled around the state giving speeches about the dire need for teacher preparation. In 1909, the Tennessee General Assembly moved to establish three teacher-training institutions, one in each of the grand divisions of the state.

1952 aerial photograph of the university

Middle Tennessee State Normal School (MTSNS or MTNS) opened on September 11, 1911, with a two-year program for training teachers. It evolved into a four-year teachers' college by 1925 with the power of granting the Bachelor of Science degree, and the institution's name was changed for the first time to Middle Tennessee State Teachers College. The school was often abbreviated as "S.T.C." In 1943, the General Assembly designated the institution a state college, changing its name for the second time to Middle Tennessee State College. This new status marked a sharp departure from the founding purpose and opened the way for expanding curricular offerings and programs. In 1965, the institution was advanced to university status, changing its name to Middle Tennessee State University. In October 2010, the Student Government Association at MTSU proposed that the university be renamed to the "University of Middle Tennessee". However, approval from both the university administration and the Tennessee Board of Regents was required and was not granted.

During the progressive movement from a two-year normal to a university, several significant milestones may be identified. In 1936, the Bachelor of Arts program was added. Responding to the expressed needs of the institution's service area, the Graduate School was established in 1951. To effect better communications and improve administrative supervision, the schools concept was introduced in 1962.

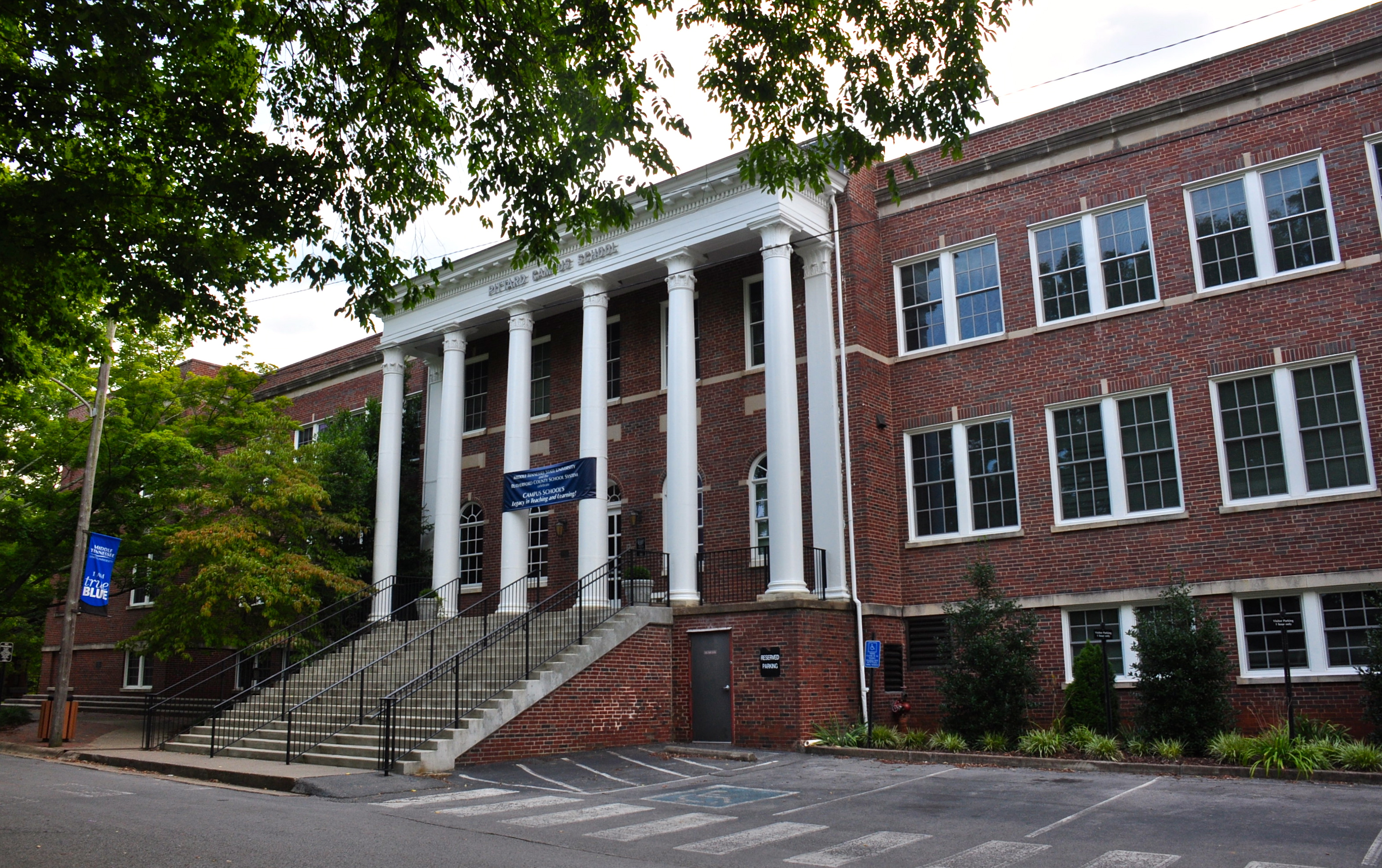
Middle Tennessee State Teachers College Training School, now known as the Homer Pittard Campus School, is listed on the National Register of Historic Places

As Middle Tennessee State University developed and grew, the Doctor of Arts program was added in 1970 and the Specialist in Education in 1974. These degree programs became attractive centerpieces for other efforts to improve and enhance institutional roles. Library resources were dramatically increased and sophisticated computer services were developed to aid instruction and administration. A highly trained faculty enabled the university to continue growth in program offerings. In 1991, the university's six schools—five undergraduate and the graduate school—became colleges. In 1998, MTSU's Honors program became the Honors College, the first in the state. In 2002, approval was granted to redesignate three D.A. programs to Doctor of Philosophy programs. Ph.D. degree offerings now include computational sciences, mathematics, and science education, molecular biosciences, economics, English, human performance, public history, and literacy studies.

In 1986, James McGill Buchanan ('40) became the first MT alumnus to be awarded the Nobel Prize. He received the Nobel Memorial Prize in Economic Sciences for his pioneering role in the development of the field of public choice, a way of studying the behavior of politicians and bureaucrats. The MTSU Honors College has named a full-tuition fellowship after James Buchanan; this honor is given to 20 students each year who take specialized courses through the Honors College.

== Colleges ==
Academic rankings

National
- U.S. News & World Report: 273 (tie)

Global
- U.S. News & World Report: 2091 (tie)

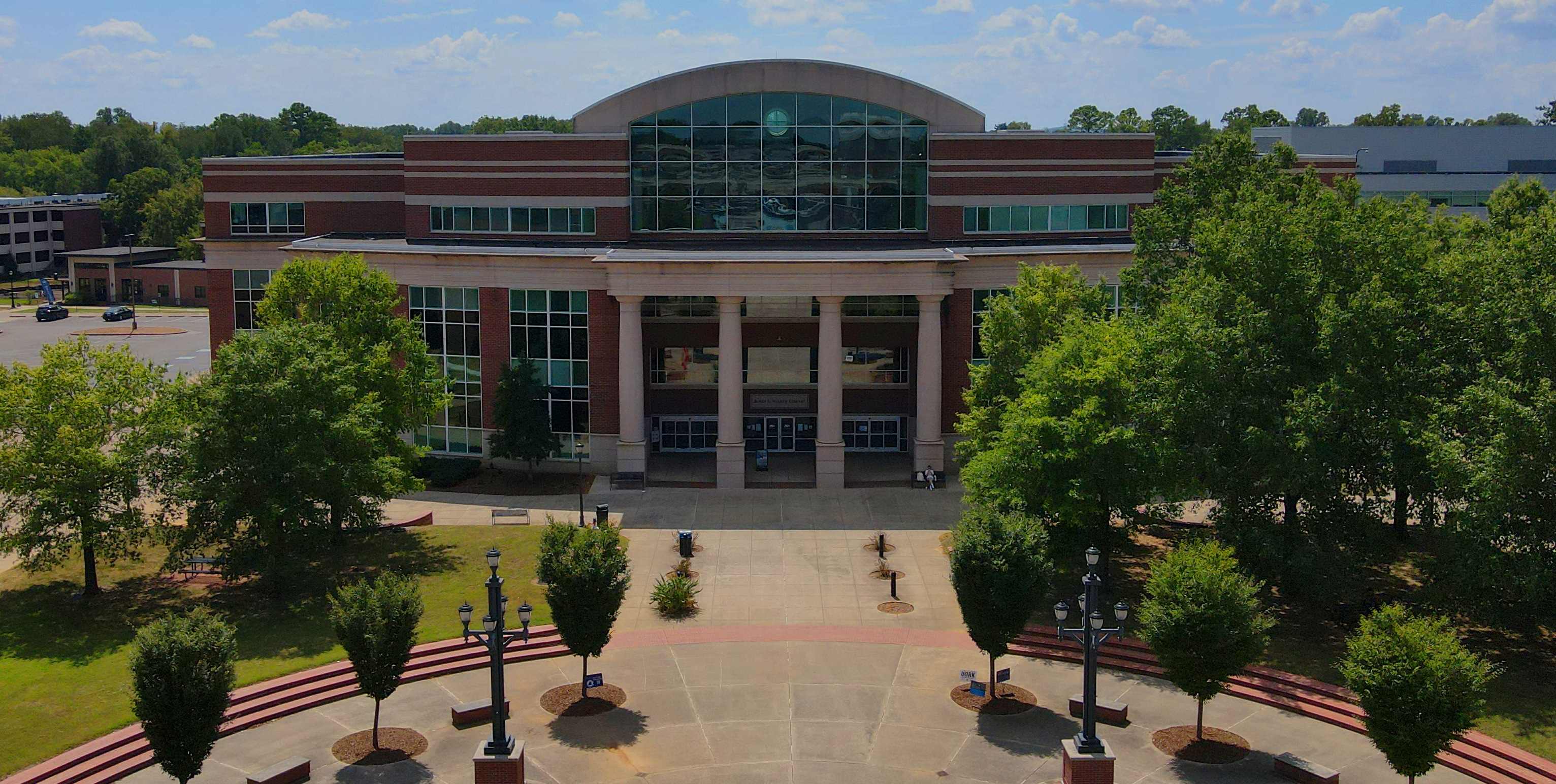
James E. Walker Library

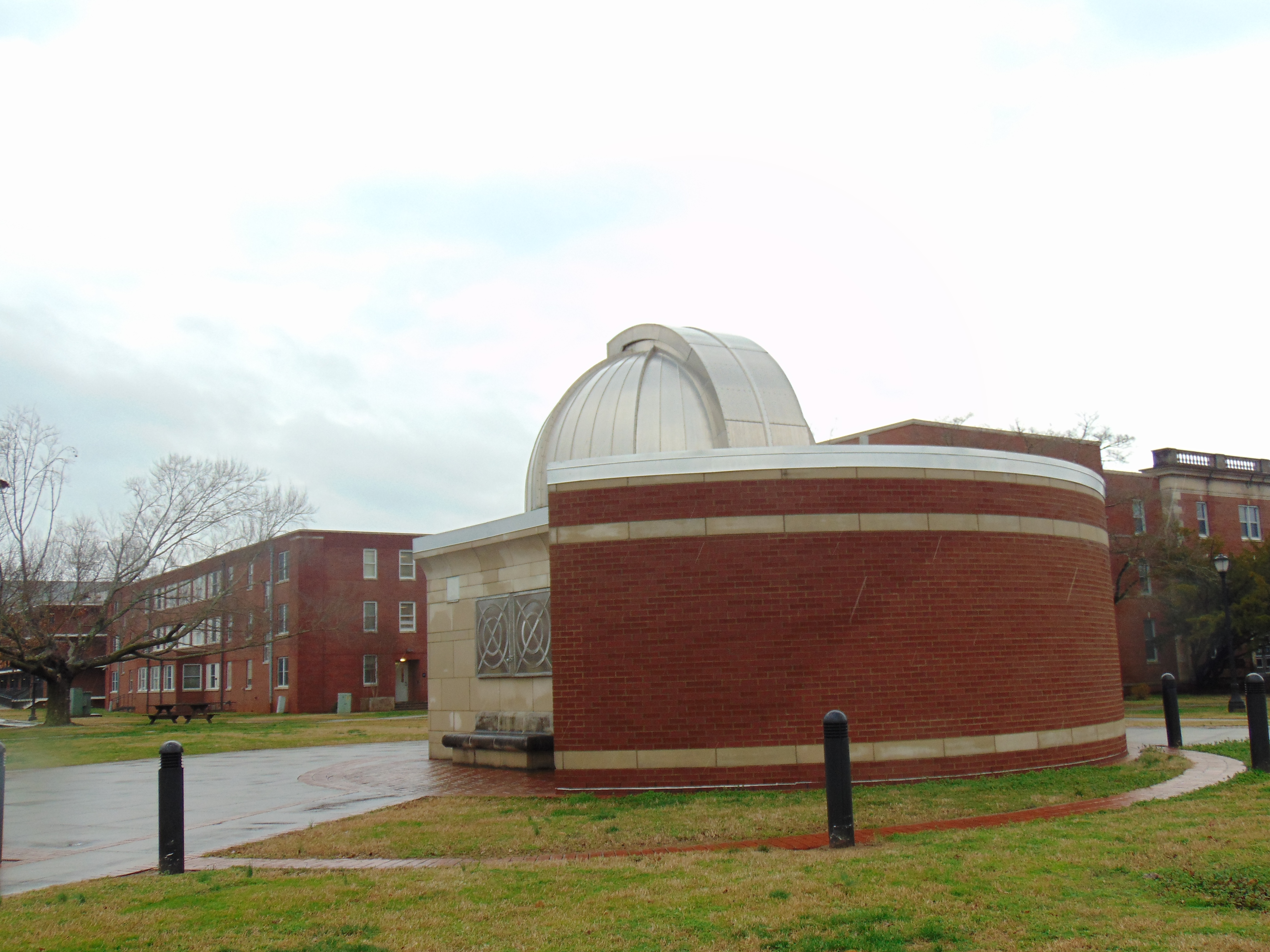
MTSU Observatory

MTSU is organized into eight colleges:

- College of Basic and Applied Sciences
- College of Behavioral and Health Sciences
- College of Education
- College of Liberal Arts
- College of Media and Entertainment
- Honors College
- Jennings A. Jones College of Business
- University College

== Faculty ==
Middle Tennessee State University employs about 1200 faculty members, with a student-to-faculty ratio of 17:1.

== Academics ==
=== Department of Recording Industry ===
The Department of Recording Industry is within the College of Media and Entertainment. The Rolling Stone College Guide recognized MTSU as having "one of the preeminent music business programs in the country."

=== Department of Aerospace ===
The Department of Aerospace offers an Aerospace Bachelor of Science degree with six concentrations: Aviation Management, Aerospace Technology, Flight Dispatch, Maintenance Management, Professional Pilot, and Unmanned Aircraft Systems (UAS). An Aeronautical Science master's degree is also available. Each concentration has been accredited by the Aviation Accreditation Board International, and the aerospace program as a whole has been accredited since 1992. The Department of Aerospace has a working agreement with the single-runway Murfreesboro Municipal Airport to provide classes on-site. A decommissioned Boeing 727 airliner (donated by FedEx) is housed at the airport as a teaching tool. American Airlines donated a 727 cockpit procedure trainer to MTSU.

The aerospace program's training fleet is made up of Diamond DA40 single-engine aircraft featuring glass cockpits, with an assortment of other single- and multi-engine aircraft available. In 2010, the Department of Aerospace purchased ten radar simulators as well as a one-of-a-kind 360 degree control tower simulator to enhance training for its air traffic control students. These simulators allow students to experience lifelike air traffic control scenarios that will aid in preparing them for training at the FAA Academy in Oklahoma City.

== Campus ==
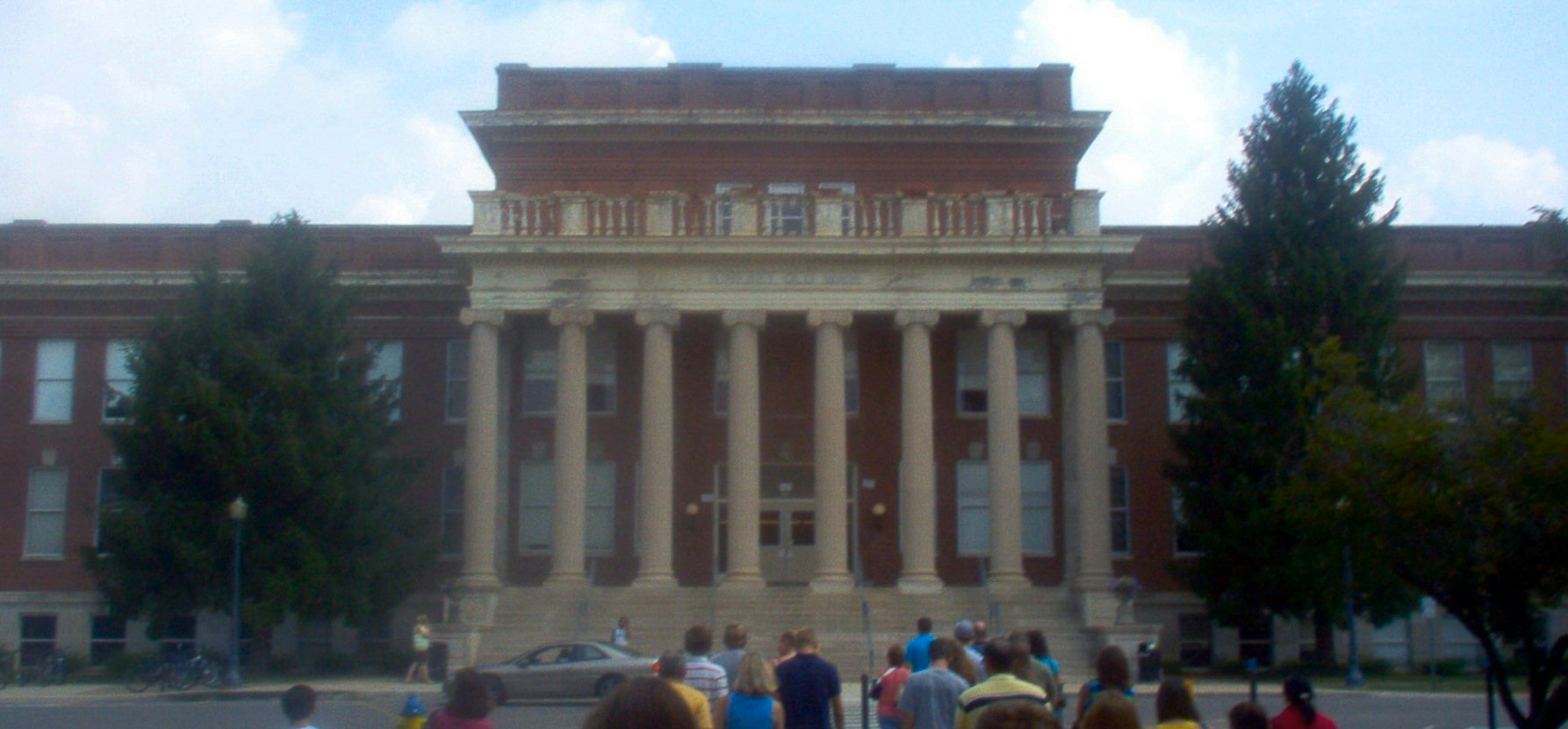
Kirksey Old Main

The campus, set on 466 acres (1.9 km^{2}), features 234 permanent buildings with 3.1 million square feet (290,000 m^{2}) of space. It is one mile (1.6 km) from the geographic center of Tennessee and 1.3 miles (2.1 km) east of downtown Murfreesboro.

There are 12 residence halls on campus, as well as two apartment complexes. The residence halls were being renovated and modernized as of 2011. In addition to the residence halls, one fraternity and six sororities have chapter houses on Greek Row.

It has been announced that the Womack Lane Apartments will be demolished in 2025 to accommodate the construction of newer living facilities on the same site.

As of November 2024, MTSU is slated to open its new, Applied Engineering Building, on the south end of campus, adjacent to the School of Concrete and Construction Management building.

Announced in 2024, the oldest building on campus, Kirksey Old Main (KOM) along with Rutledge Hall are to be renovated with a $53.4 million project slated to be completed in 2026.

In the center is the main quad, surrounded by the Learning Resource Center, the Business and Aerospace Building, the Mass Communications Building, and the James E. Walker Library. One of the newest facilities is the US$147 million Science Building adjacent to the library, on the south end of campus. The eastern part of campus features some of the newest structures, such as the College of Education, Student Union, and the Academic Classroom which is the newest building at a cost of $47 million. Other notable facilities include the Recreation Center, softball field, intramural fields, and Greek Row.

In addition to alcohol prohibitions, all tobacco products, including electronic cigarettes, are prohibited on campus.

The Japanese Supplementary School in Middle Tennessee (JSMT, 中部テネシー日本語補習校 Chūbu Teneshī Nihongo Hoshūkō), a weekend Japanese education program, holds its classes at Peck Hall, while its school offices are in Jefferson Square.

== Student life ==
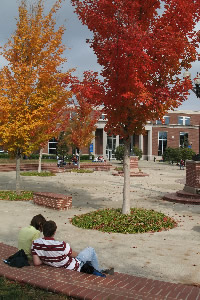
The quad in front of the James E. Walker Library

Undergraduate demographics as of Fall 2023
Race and ethnicity	Total
White	64%
Black	14%
Hispanic	10%
Asian	4%
Two or more races	4%
International student	2%
Unknown	1%
Economic diversity
Low-income (Note: The percentage of students who received an income-based federal Pell grant intended for low-income students.)	35%
Affluent (Note: The percentage of students who are a part of the American middle class at the bare minimum.)	65%

=== Media outlets ===
Due to a significant emphasis on Mass Communication at MTSU, the campus has several mass media outlets. Sidelines is the campus's editorially independent, student-run news source, with daily content online and special print editions three times per semester. Off Center is an online-only publication sponsored by the Margaret H. Ordubadian University Writing Center. Collage: A Journal of Creative Expression is the Honors College's semesterly magazine for student-submitted literary and artistic creative works. MT10 (formerly known as MTTV), a student-run TV station, is carried locally by Comcast. The two radio stations on MTSU's campus are 88.3 FM WMTS, a student-run radio station, and 89.5 FM WMOT, a publicly supported Americana & Roots Music radio station operated in a partnership with Music City Roots, a weekly Americana live performance entity based in nearby Franklin, Tennessee.

==== Sidelines ====
Sidelines, founded in 1925, is the editorially independent, student-run newspaper of MTSU. The physical product is printed by The Tennessean, while the digital edition is hosted at MTSUSidelines.com. Archives for Sidelines between 1938 and 2011 are available in MTSU's digital collections.

==== Off Center: A Creative Magazine for the MTSU Community ====
Off Center, first published online in 2016, is a student-led publication produced by the tutors of the Margaret H. Ordubadian University Writing Center which focuses on the creative works of students, faculty, and staff.

==== Scientia et Humanitas ====
Scientia et Humanitas is a peer-reviewed journal sponsored by the University Honors College which allows undergraduate and graduate students a professional publishing experience, and shares academic research on campus. Scientia et Humanitas was first published in 2011.

=== Student organizations ===
The university is host to approximately 340 student organizations, fraternities, and interest groups. About five percent of undergraduate men and nine percent of undergraduate women are active in MTSU's Greek system.

MTSU's Greek Life consists of numerous social fraternities and sororities.

The Band of Blue is considered the largest student organization on campus, counting approximately 350 members each year; it is a marching band.

The university hosts MT Lambda, an LGBTQ organization for students founded in 1988.

== Athletics ==
MTSU logomark

Middle Tennessee's athletic teams, known as the Blue Raiders, compete in Conference USA of the NCAA's Division I in the Football Bowl Subdivision. On November 29, 2012, MTSU announced they had accepted an invitation to the conference, and formally became a part of Conference USA on July 1, 2013. The school transferred from the Sun Belt Conference, and had participated in the Ohio Valley Conference before that.

The most prominent athletic facilities on the campus are Johnny "Red" Floyd football stadium, Murphy Center basketball arena, Reese Smith Jr. baseball field, and Alumni Memorial Gym volleyball court. MTSU has won two national championships: golf in 1965, and men's doubles tennis in 2007. The Blue Raider football team won the Sun Belt Championship two times (2001 and 2006) and has participated in thirteen bowl games (1956, 1959, 1961, 1964, 2006, 2009, 2010, 2013, 2015, 2016, 2017, 2018, & 2021) with a 5-8 bowl record. The Blue Raider Baseball team has sixteen conference titles and fourteen NCAA tournament appearances.

The MTSU mascot is "Lightning", a winged horse based on Pegasus from Greek mythology.

== Notable alumni ==
MTSU's alumni include:

- Bill Boner (1967) – Mayor of Nashville, Tennessee (1987–1991) and U.S. Representative (Democrat – 5th District Tennessee – 1979–1987)
- Julien Baker, rock artist
- Raleigh Brown, politician and judge in Texas
- Sharon Van Etten, singer-songwriter
- Reed Blankenship, football player
- James M. Buchanan, economist
- Kevin Byard, football player
- Seth Christian, film director
- Alysha Clark, basketball player
- George S. Clinton, composer
- Donna Scott Davenport, former MTSU adjunct professor; retired juvenile court judge
- Bart Gordon (1971) – U.S. Representative (Democrat – 6th District Tennessee – 1985–2011)
- Albert Gore Sr., U.S. senator and Democratic Party nominee for U.S. president
- Mac Burrus, guitarist; member of Self
- Hardy, country music artist
- Kelly Holcomb, football player
- Amber Holt, basketball player
- Chris James, audio engineer; member of Self
- Tay Keith, music producer
- Lecrae, rapper
- Amy Lee, singer
- Matt Mahaffey, singer-songwriter; member of Self
- Sondra Locke, actress
- Bayer Mack, music executive
- Hillary Scott, country music artist (Lady A)
- Chuck Taylor, MLB baseball player
- Chris Young, singer
- Count Bass D, rapper

=== Nobel Prize laureates ===
In 1986, James McGill Buchanan ('40) became the first MTSU alumnus to be awarded the Nobel Prize. Buchanan received the Nobel Memorial Prize in Economic Sciences for his pioneering role in the development of the field of public choice, a way of studying politician's and bureaucrat's behaviors.

In addition, former MTSU economics professor Muhammad Yunus received the Nobel Peace Prize for efforts through microcredit to create economic and social development.
