= Gloria Johnson (politician) =

American politician (born 1962)

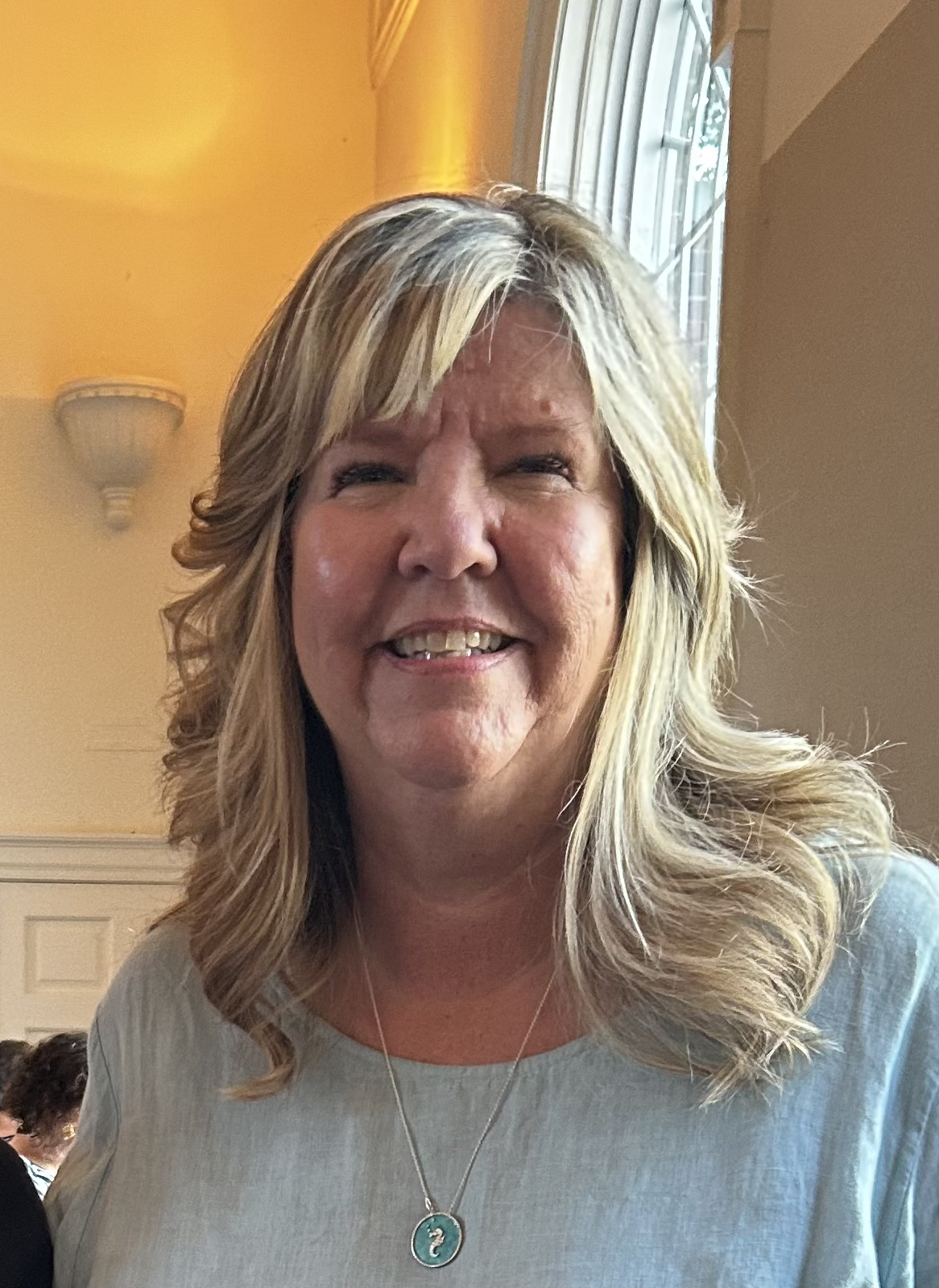
- Johnson in 2023

Member of the Tennessee House of Representatives
- Incumbent
- Assumed office January 8, 2019
- Preceded by: Eddie Smith
- Constituency: 13th district (2019–2023); 90th district (2023–present)
- In office January 8, 2013 – January 13, 2015
- Preceded by: Harry J. Tindell
- Succeeded by: Eddie Smith
- Constituency: 13th district

Personal details
- Born: May 25, 1962 (age 64) Denver, Colorado, U.S.
- Party: Democratic
- Education: University of Tennessee (BA)
- Website: House website

Gloria Johnson (born May 25, 1962) is an American politician and Democratic member of the Tennessee House of Representatives currently representing the 90th district, and formerly the 13th district, based in Knoxville. In April 2023, she and two other state representatives faced expulsion votes from the Tennessee General Assembly after taking to the floor of the State House unrecognized to protest gun violence. Johnson was the only one of the three legislators not to be expelled. Johnson was the Democratic Party nominee for the 2024 United States Senate election in Tennessee, losing in a landslide to incumbent Republican Marsha Blackburn.

== Tennessee House of Representatives ==
In 2012, Johnson was elected to represent the 13th district in the Tennessee House of Representatives. She lost re-election to Eddie Smith in 2014. Following a failed attempt in 2016, Johnson defeated Smith in 2018. She was re-elected in 2020. Following redistricting, Johnson's residence became located in the 15th district, which already had a Democratic incumbent. Because of this, Johnson moved to the 90th district and won the seat in 2022.

In January 2021, Johnson was assigned a small, windowless conference room for use as her office in the Cordell Hull State Office Building. Johnson disagreed with the room she was given, and alleged her assignment to it was retribution from State House Speaker Cameron Sexton after she was the only representative to abstain from voting for Sexton in the speakership election. Johnson instead moved her desk to the hallway outside and gave the room to her assistant, who was originally given a non-connecting closet for her office. In 2022, following a year-long campaign, she was assigned a new office space, subsequent to an ADA compliance complaint.

Following reportage of Rutherford County, Tennessee juvenile arrest and incarceration scandal, in January 2022, Johnson, with Senator Heidi Campbell, filed a joint resolution to remove juvenile court Judge Donna Scott Davenport from the bench.

=== Expulsion vote ===
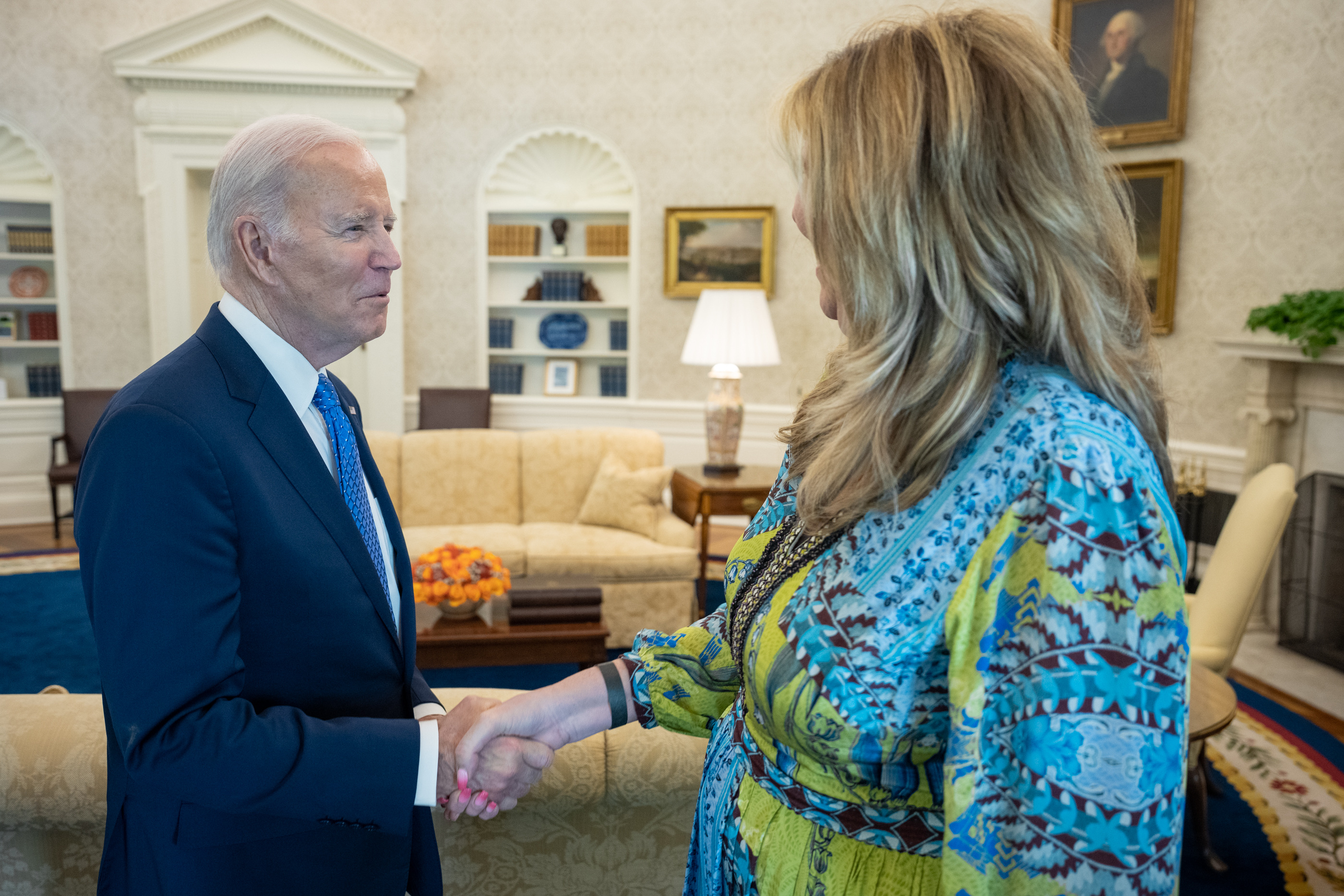
President Joe Biden with Gloria Johnson at the White House in April 2023

During a legislative session three days after the 2023 Covenant School shooting, Johnson and fellow Democratic representatives Justin Jones and Justin Pearson led a gun control protest on the House floor. Later dubbed the "Tennessee Three", the trio interrupted House proceedings with their demonstration as thousands protested outside of the building. The demonstration violated the chamber's decorum rules, as the three members were not recognized to speak and utilized a bullhorn.

Subsequently, House leadership stripped Johnson and Jones of their committee assignments (Pearson did not serve on any committees), and resolutions to expel the three were drawn up. During her interview with Mother Jones a day before her expulsion vote, Johnson accused House Republicans of fascism and said she believed Tennessee was less democratic than North Korea. Jones and Pearson were expelled while Johnson avoided expulsion by the margin of a single vote. The expulsion vote gathered national attention for the three Democratic lawmakers, including praise from Vice President Kamala Harris during a speech at Fisk University following the vote.

== 2024 U.S. Senate campaign ==
In late July 2023, it was reported Johnson would launch a campaign the following month to challenge Senator Marsha Blackburn in the 2024 election. In early August, Johnson launched an exploratory committee in preparation for a Senate run. On September 5, Johnson formally launched her senate campaign.

In March 2024, Grammy-winning vocalists Brandi Carlile, Emmylou Harris, Maren Morris, and Allison Russell, along with more than 30 other artists, came together to record and release a new "soul anthem" called Tennessee Rise in support of Johnson's senate campaign.

Johnson won the Democratic primary on August 1, 2024, with 70% of the vote to become the party's nominee. She defeated previous Democratic nominee for U.S. Senate in 2020, Marquita Bradshaw, along with Civil Miller-Watkins and Lola Denise Brown.

Johnson went on to lose the general election to Marsha Blackburn, garnering 34.2% of the vote to Blackburn's 63.8%.

== Personal life ==
Johnson lives in Knoxville, Tennessee. She is Christian. Johnson is a retired special education teacher of 27 years. She was a teacher at Central High School in Knoxville when a shooting occurred at the school in 2008.

== Electoral history ==
=== U.S. Senate ===
2024 United States Senate election in Tennessee Democratic primary
Primary election
Party	Candidate	Votes	%
Democratic	Gloria Johnson	143,962	70.20
Democratic	Marquita Bradshaw	44,657	21.78
Democratic	Lola Brown	10,027	4.89
Democratic	Civil Miller-Watkins	6,420	3.13
Total votes		205,066	100.00

2024 United States Senate election in Tennessee
Party	Candidate	Votes	%	±%
Republican	Marsha Blackburn (incumbent)	1,918,743	63.80	+9.09%
Democratic	Gloria Johnson	1,027,461	34.16	−9.76%
Independent	Tharon Chandler	28,444	0.95	N/A
Independent	Pamela Moses	24,682	0.82	N/A
Independent	Hastina Robinson	8,278	0.28	N/A
Total votes		3,007,608	100.00	

=== Tennessee State Senate ===
2011 Tennessee Senate 6th district special election
Party	Candidate	Votes	%
Republican	Becky Duncan Massey	10,006	63.56
Democratic	Gloria S. Johnson	5,737	36.44
Total votes		15,743	100.00

=== Tennessee House of Representatives ===
==== 13th district ====
2012 Tennessee House of Representatives 13th district election
Primary election
Party	Candidate	Votes	%
Democratic	Gloria Johnson	778	100.00
Total votes		778	100.00
General election
Democratic	Gloria Johnson	10,018	48.09
Republican	Gary Loe	9,730	46.71
Independent	Nick H. Cazana	1,084	5.20
Total votes		20,832	100.00

2014 Tennessee House of Representatives 13th district election
Primary election
Party	Candidate	Votes	%
Democratic	Gloria Johnson (incumbent)	1,798	100.0
Total votes		1,798	100.00
General election
Republican	Eddie Smith	6,730	50.69
Democratic	Gloria Johnson (incumbent)	6,548	49.31
Total votes		13,278	100.00

2016 Tennessee House of Representatives 13th district election
Primary election
Party	Candidate	Votes	%
Democratic	Gloria Johnson	1,639	100.00
Total votes		1,639	100.00
General election
Republican	Eddie Smith (incumbent)	11,162	50.34
Democratic	Gloria Johnson	11,011	49.66
Total votes		22,173	100.00

2018 Tennessee House of Representatives 13th district election
Party	Candidate	Votes	%
Democratic	Gloria Johnson	4,243	100.00
Total votes		4,243	100.00
General election
Democratic	Gloria Johnson	11,495	54.92
Republican	Eddie Smith (incumbent)	9,041	43.20
Independent	Zachary Houk	394	1.88
Total votes		20,930	100.0

2020 Tennessee House of Representatives 13th district election
Party	Candidate	Votes	%
Democratic	Gloria Johnson (incumbent)	5,031	100.00
Total votes		5,031	100.00
General election
Democratic	Gloria Johnson (incumbent)	14,242	52.93
Republican	Elaine Davis	12,664	47.07
Total votes		26,906	100.00

==== 90th district ====
2022 Tennessee House of Representatives 90th district election
Party	Candidate	Votes	%
Democratic	Gloria Johnson (incumbent)	3,690	100.00
Total votes		3,690	100.00
General election
Democratic	Gloria Johnson (incumbent)	8,473	57.90
Republican	David "Pozy" Poczobut	6,162	42.10
Total votes		14,635	100.00

2024 Tennessee House of Representatives 90th district election
Primary election
Party	Candidate	Votes	%
Democratic	Gloria Johnson (incumbent)	4,041	100.00
Total votes		4,041	100.00
General election
Democratic	Gloria Johnson (incumbent)	16,372	99.69
Write-in	Zachary Houk	51	0.31
Total votes		16,423	100.00

Party political offices
Preceded by Phil Bredesen	Democratic nominee for U.S. Senator from Tennessee (Class 1); 2024	Most recent
