= Karen Williams (politician) =

Member of the Tennessee Senate from the 90th district
- In office 1983–1995

Personal details
- Born: September 5, 1950 (age 75) Memphis, Tennessee
- Party: Republican

Karen R. Williams (born September 5, 1950 in Memphis, Tennessee) is an American politician from Tennessee. She served in the Tennessee House of Representatives from 1982 to 1994, representing the 90th district.

== Political career ==
Williams was first elected to the Tennessee House of Representatives in 1982, when she defeated incumbent John Spence. She served there until 1994, when her district was eliminated in redistricting. Williams ran for the Tennessee Public Service Commission in 1994, but narrowly lost the Republican primary to Tom Watson, a firefighter from Memphis. On March 6, 1996, Williams was appointed by Governor Don Sundquist as a judge to the Shelby County Circuit Court, filling the vacancy created by the death of James Tharpe. She was sworn in on March 27, 1996.

Williams retired from the Shelby County Circuit Court in 2014. In November 2015, she was honored with a portrait unveiling at the Shelby County Courthouse.

== Personal life ==
Williams was born on September 5, 1950 in Memphis, Tennessee. She received her Bachelor of Arts from the University of Arkansas in 1972, and her Juris Doctor from Memphis State University in 1976. She is an Episcopalian.
