= Donna Scott Davenport =

American judge

Donna Scott Davenport (born Scott) is the first judge to have overseen the Rutherford County, Tennessee juvenile justice system, filling the newly created position in 2000. She is also a former adjunct professor at her alma mater, Middle Tennessee State University (MTSU). She presided over the juvenile court and legal system for the county, appointed magistrates (formerly, referees), set protocols, directed police and heard cases involving minors, including parents charged with child neglect. Despite published reports that Davenport operated juvenile court outside of the tenets of law, including by her own admission, Davenport remained on the bench until retiring at the end of her term in September 2022 while lawmakers debated ending her tenure sooner. Her actions while on the bench are the subject of a four-part podcast, The Kids of Rutherford County. She was also featured on Last Week Tonight with John Oliver for sending a high percentage of black elementary school juveniles to prison for minor and made-up offenses.

== Family and education ==
Donna Scott was born to Howard Scott and Winifred Campbell Scott (a teacher). Her father was a decorated United States Air Force pilot with a distinguished World War II service record.

She attended North Greenville University, a private Baptist college in Tigerville, South Carolina. She subsequently received bachelor's, then master's degrees in criminal justice from MTSU, followed by a J.D. from Nashville School of Law, in 1986.

She wrote the Tennessee State bar exam about a year after graduation. After failing the exam four times, Davenport passed in 1995, on her fifth attempt, then began teaching as an adjunct professor of criminal justice at MTSU the following year.

== Career ==
Davenport was admitted to the Tennessee Bar in 1995, nine years after completing law school. She co-founded Rogers and Scott Attorneys at Law in 1995 with J. Mark Rogers, now a Sixteenth Circuit Courts of Tennessee judge overseeing Rutherford County. In 1998, she was appointed as a part-time juvenile court referee (now Magistrate) by a Rutherford County Judge. She left the law firm and became a full-time court referee in 1999.

The following year, the county violated federal law 191 times by keeping kids incarcerated for longer than legally allowed. Interviewed, Davenport estimated that half of the noted violations were levied for children uttering curse words to her or another, for which she typically punished them with between two and 10 days in jail, despite admitting to the illegality of the sentence: "Was I in violation?... "Heck, yes. But am I going to allow a child to cuss anyone out? Heck, no." Less than three months later, in 2000, Davenport was elected to the newly created position of juvenile court judge.

She was subsequently elected twice, unopposed, as the incumbent, in 2006 and 2014, to two consecutive eight-year terms as Judge of the Juvenile Court of Rutherford County. Her final term expired in September 2022.

In March 2013, following acceptance of her capstone project, "Rutherford County: A Multi-Systemic Strategy with Partners", Davenport was named a Fellow of the Center for Juvenile Justice Reform of Georgetown University Law Center in Washington, DC.

Murfreesboro Magazine named her a recipient of a 2014 Women in Business award.

== Illegal juvenile arrest policy scandal ==
In her role as sole juvenile court judge, Davenport devised a unique, so-called "filter system" aside from federal or local processes. In 2003, Davenport issued a memo, which outlined her decree for local law enforcement to arrest, transport to the juvenile detention center for screening, then file charging papers for all children, emphasizing that "IT IS SO ORDERED". She later modified the directive to add lesser violations, such as truancy.

In 2008, Rutherford County included a new 43,000 sq ft (4,000 m^{2}) juvenile detention center in its $23,300,000 expansion of the county jail. Subsequently, Davenport narrated a marketing video, "What Can the Rutherford County Juvenile Detention Center Do For You?” featuring images of children in black-and-white striped prison uniforms, to solicit other counties in the region to have "detained youth" sent to the new facility for incarceration, at $175 per day per child. The video claimed that over 20 Tennessee counties had contracted with Rutherford's juvenile jail. As of 2021, 39 counties were contracting with Rutherford County to imprison youth, along with the U.S. Marshals Service.

In 2014, 48 percent of children brought before Davenport were jailed, while the statewide average was five percent.

In 2016, a 15-year-old was placed in solitary confinement for five days with only a mattress and toilet. The family filed a complaint against the Rutherford County juvenile jail, with support from the ACLU. Davenport responded by issuing an order temporarily suspending the use of solitary confinement for juveniles. Another child was denied his psychiatric medication while jailed for four days, and a developmentally disabled child was also ordered into indefinite solitary confinement.

In 2016, lawmakers called for a federal investigation into the arrest and detainment of 11 young, black elementary school children in Rutherford County who had merely, allegedly, witnessed a fight between five and six-year-olds. The following year, Rutherford County agreed to a class action settlement of $397,500 for the 11 children. In May 2017, a federal court ordered Rutherford County to stop using Davenport's so-called "filter system", noting that it "departs drastically" from ordinary juvenile detention standards. The court wrote that the "illegal detention" is causing "irreparable harm every day" to children in the jurisdiction.

In December 2017, United States Federal Judge Waverly Crenshaw Jr. settled a class action suit against Rutherford County on behalf of 394 claimants for $6 million, awarded to "citizens taken into custody and/or detained by the Rutherford County Juvenile Detention Center on or after Oct. 14, 2015", and signed an order preventing Davenport from incarcerating children.

In October 2021, PBS News Hour broadcast an investigative report by Meribah Knight of Nashville Public Radio (WPLN) and Ken Armstrong of ProPublica which exposes Davenport's enforced culture of operating outside the law throughout her more than 20 years on the juvenile court bench; Investigative reporters Knight and Armstrong were subsequently nominated for a Pulitzer Prize for the feature article. That month, Davenport was quoted as stating that her job is not legal but, "God's mission", referencing herself as "the mother of the county". The following month, Davenport was reported as still "parading herself around as some kind of Great White Mother to Rutherford County's children".

Lawyer for the 2017 class action plaintiffs Kyle Mothershead stated, in February 2022, that Rutherford County had illegally arrested and incarcerated minor children prior to Davenport's appointment as its juvenile court judge in 2000.

=== Outcomes ===
Rutherford County Representative John Ray Clemmons released a statement decrying inaction, "As I stated in 2016, there is no rational justification for any of this in our society. Both the state and county have obviously failed children and families, predominantly Black individuals and that these individuals, through their own acts and admissions, have proven themselves wholly unfit for the important positions they currently hold." Senator Jeff Yarbro stated that "It's a horror show plain and simple, it's abusive and it doesn't even resemble law".

Following news reports, MTSU announced that Davenport had been removed from the school's faculty.

In January 2022, Davenport announced plans to retire at the end of her term, in September 2022, remaining on the bench until that time. She released a statement, in the wake of allegations against her, that she remains "so proud of what this Court has accomplished in the last two decades and how it has positively affected the lives of young people and families in Rutherford County".

Senator Heidi Campbell and Representative Gloria Johnson sponsored a resolution to authorize the Tennessee State Senate and House leaders to choose a judicial panel to consider the case for removing Davenport from the bench.

The Rutherford County Commission was assembling a new Juvenile Detention Board to "oversee incarceration operations", effectively replacing Davenport and her successors as oversight for juvenile detention staff, which is led by its director, Lynn Duke.

In August 2022, Republican Juvenile Court nominee Travis Lampley won the juvenile court judgeship, and succeeded Davenport in September.

In January 2023, State Representative Mike Sparks responded by introducing House Bill 720 to the Tennessee General Assembly, undertaking to protect juveniles from interrogation without a guardian present. Representative Gloria Johnson, one of two Democrats seeking to oust Davenport in 2022, remarked, in 2023, that Davenport "didn’t care about the laws... They ignored the laws and created their own... I don’t know if it would stop that", in reference to the proposed legislation.

Davenport's juvenile court legacy is narrated in a four-part podcast, The Kids of Rutherford County. Released in October 2023, the series is produced by Serial Productions and The New York Times in partnership with ProPublica and Nashville Public Radio, and hosted by Meribah Knight of WPLN.
