= Henry Craft =

American politician (1949–2024)

Member of the Tennessee House of Representatives from the 90th district
- In office 1973–1975
- Preceded by: William V. Lawson Jr.
- Succeeded by: John W. Spence

Personal details
- Born: October 19, 1949 Proctor, Arkansas, U.S.
- Died: December 19, 2024 (aged 75)
- Party: Republican

Henry N. Craft Jr. (October 19, 1949 – December 19, 2024) was an American politician from the state of Tennessee. He served as a Republican member of the Tennessee House of Representatives from 1973 to 1975.

== Biography ==
Craft was born in Proctor, Arkansas, a farm settlement in Crittenden County. He moved to Memphis, Tennessee, at the age of 12, and graduated from Memphis University School in 1967, Vanderbilt University in 1971, and the Mississippi College School of Law in 1980. As a law student, he pulled off an upset in the Republican primary for the Memphis-based 90th district of the Tennessee House of Representatives, defeating two-term incumbent William V. Lawson Jr. After winning by a large margin in 1972, he was defeated by Democrat John W. Spence in 1974. Craft would later become a Libertarian. After practicing law in Memphis, he worked at the Commodity Exchange in New York from 1989 to 2000, then relocated to Chattanooga. He died on December 19, 2024.

== Electoral history ==
=== 1972 ===
==== Primary election ====
Tennessee House of Representatives, District 90, 1972 primary election * denotes incumbent Source:
Party	Candidate	Votes	%
Republican	Henry Craft	1,278	53.4
Republican	William V. Lawson Jr. *	1,114	46.6
Total votes		2,392	100

==== General election ====
Tennessee House of Representatives, District 90, 1972 general election * denotes incumbent Source:
Party	Candidate	Votes	%
Republican	Henry Craft	7,896	63.9
Democratic	Howard A. Cohn	4,462	36.1
Total votes		12,358	100

=== 1974 ===
==== Primary election ====
Tennessee House of Representatives, District 90, 1974 primary election * denotes incumbent Source:
Party	Candidate	Votes	%
Republican	Henry Craft *	2,017	63.7
Republican	Ron Poe	1,003	31.7
Republican	Mary Belle Manley	144	4.6
Total votes		3,164	100

==== General election ====
Tennessee House of Representatives, District 90, 1974 general election * denotes incumbent Source:
Party	Candidate	Votes	%
Democratic	John W. Spence	5,343	50.4
Republican	Henry Craft *	5,263	49.6
Total votes		10,606	100
