= 2018 United States Senate election in Tennessee =

- November 6, 2018
- Turnout: 54.46% ▼7.4 pp
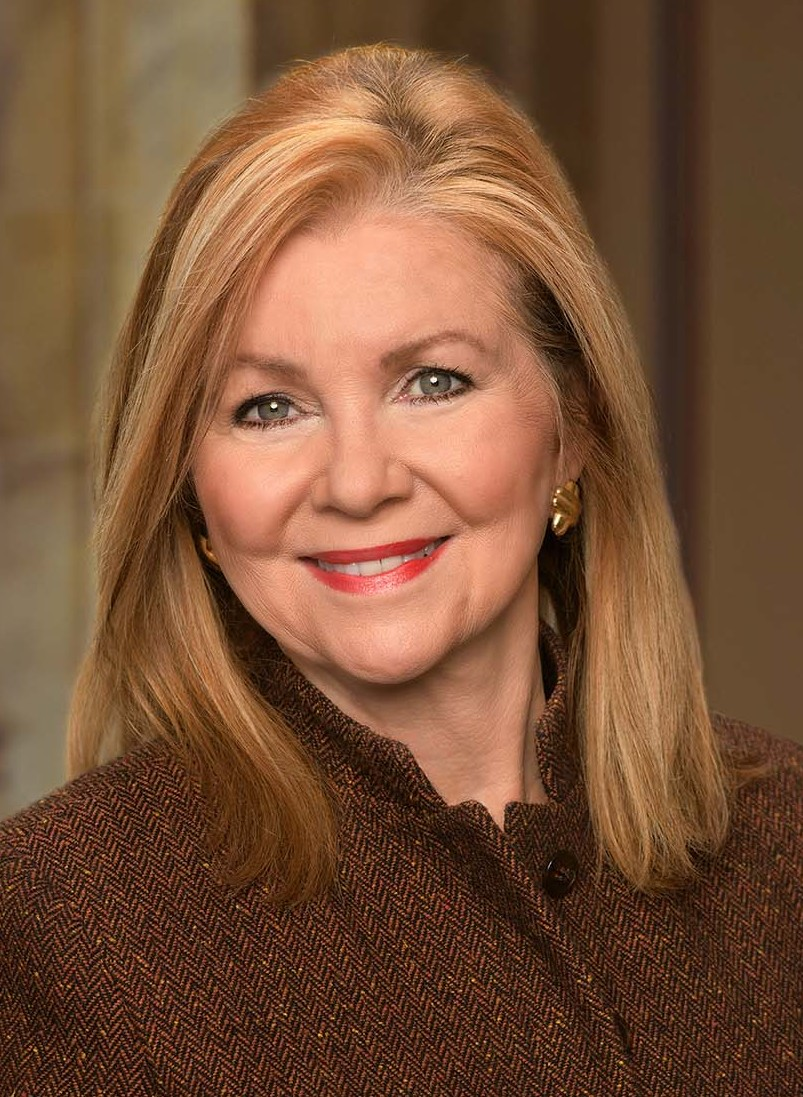

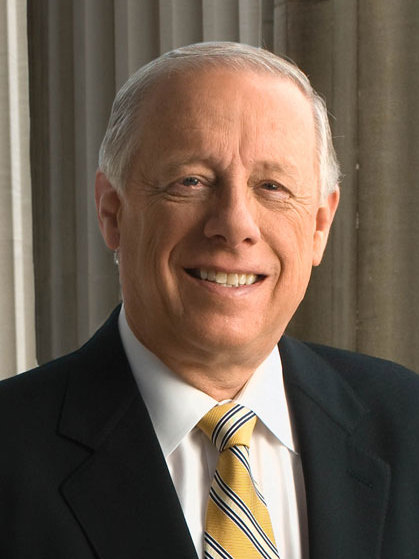
| Nominee | Marsha Blackburn | Phil Bredesen |
| Party | Republican | Democratic |
| Popular vote | 1,227,483 | 985,450 |
| Percentage | 54.71% | 43.92% |
- Blackburn: 40–50% 50–60% 60–70% 70–80% 80–90% >90% Bredesen: 40–50% 50–60% 60–70% 70–80% 80–90% >90% Tie: 50% No data
U.S. senator before election
Bob Corker
Republican
Elected U.S. Senator
Marsha Blackburn
Republican

The 2018 United States Senate election in Tennessee took place on November 6, 2018, concurrently with other elections to the United States Senate, elections to the United States House of Representatives, and various state and local elections. Incumbent Republican senator Bob Corker opted to retire instead of running for a third term. Republican U.S. representative Marsha Blackburn won the open seat, defeating former Democratic governor Phil Bredesen. The primaries took place on August 2, 2018, with Blackburn and Bredesen winning their respective party nominations.

Early in the campaign, Bob Corker said that Blackburn's opponent, Democrat Phil Bredesen, was "a very good mayor, a very good governor, a very good businessperson", that he had "real appeal" and "crossover appeal", and that the two of them had cooperated well over the years. However, Corker said he would vote for Blackburn and donate to her campaign, and questioned whether Bredesen would be able to win a Senate seat in a red state like Tennessee. After Corker's praise for Bredesen, Senate Majority Leader Mitch McConnell warned Corker that such comments could cost the Republican Party its Senate majority. Shortly after Corker's comments, Trump tweeted an endorsement of Blackburn.

In October 2018, singer-songwriter Taylor Swift, who cast her ballot in Tennessee in this midterm, endorsed Bredesen. The endorsement was notable given that Swift had previously been publicly apolitical, but spoke out because Blackburn's voting record in Congress "appalled" and "terrified" her. Swift shared a link to the nonpartisan voter registration website Vote.org, which saw a significant spike in page views and new registrations. Donald Trump criticized Swift's endorsement.

This election was expected to be among the most competitive Senate races in 2018, with CNN calling it the single most important Senate race in the country. Polls showed the race as close until the confirmation hearings for Supreme Court Justice Brett Kavanaugh started, which many Tennesseans believed the Democratic Party handled poorly. The hearings also energized Republican voters and helped Blackburn pull ahead of Bredesen in polls. Bredesen also announced his support for Kavanaugh, which some believe cost him supporters.

This was Tennessee's closest Senate race since 2006, with Blackburn winning by a 10.8% margin. Bredesen aimed to be the fourth former governor of Tennessee to be elected to the U.S Senate after Andrew Johnson, Isham G. Harris, and Lamar Alexander.

== Republican primary ==
=== Candidates ===
==== Nominee ====
- Marsha Blackburn, U.S. representative from Tennessee's 7th congressional district

==== Eliminated in primary ====
- Aaron Pettigrew, truck driver

==== Withdrawn ====
- Bob Corker, incumbent U.S. senator
- Larry Crim, perennial candidate
- Stephen Fincher, former U.S. representative
- Andy Ogles, former director of the Tennessee chapter of Americans for Prosperity
- Rolando Toyos, ophthalmologist and candidate for the Shelby County Commission in 2010

==== Declined ====
- Mae Beavers, former state senator (previously ran for governor)
- Diane Black, U.S. representative from Tennessee's 6th congressional district (ran for governor)
- Randy Boyd, former commissioner of the Department of Economic and Community Development (ran for governor)
- Tim Burchett, Knox County mayor (ran for U.S. House)
- Joe Carr, former state representative, candidate for U.S. Senate in 2014 and candidate for TN-06 in 2016
- Chuck Fleischmann, U.S. representative from Tennessee's 3rd congressional district (ran for re-election)
- Mark Green, state senator (ran for U.S. House)
- Beth Harwell, speaker of the Tennessee House of Representatives (ran for governor)
- Bill Haslam, governor of Tennessee
- David Kustoff, U.S. representative from Tennessee's 8th congressional district (ran for re-election)
- Bill Lee, businessman (ran for governor)
- Peyton Manning, retired football player
- Randy McNally, lieutenant governor of Tennessee
- Ron Ramsey, former lieutenant governor and candidate for governor in 2010

=== Speculation surrounding Senator Corker ===
On September 26, 2017, Republican senator Bob Corker announced that he would not seek another term in 2018. Many called on Corker to reverse his decision to retire. Former U.S. representative Fincher dropped out of the race, calling on Corker to jump back in and challenge U.S. representative Blackburn for the GOP nomination. Fincher said in a statement that the GOP should unite "behind a candidate who can win" the general election. Blackburn said she would remain in the race even if Corker reversed his decision. Amid the speculation about Corker's decision, many of Tennessee's Republican politicians, including many in the Tennessee General Assembly, reiterated their support for Blackburn. Corker's chief of staff announced on February 27, 2018, that Corker would stick with his plan to retire.

=== Polling ===
Hypothetical polling

| Poll source | Date(s) administered | Sample size | Margin of error | Marsha Blackburn | Stephen Fincher | Rolando Toyos | Undecided |
|---|---|---|---|---|---|---|---|
| WPA Intelligence (R-Club for Growth) | January 14–15, 2018 | 502 | ± 4.4% | 66% | 13% | – | 21% |
| Triton Polling & Research (R) | December 12–18, 2017 | 1,028 | ± 3.1% | 58% | 11% | 4% | 27% |

| Poll source | Date(s) administered | Sample size | Margin of error | Marsha Blackburn | Bob Corker | Stephen Fincher | Undecided |
|---|---|---|---|---|---|---|---|
| Ragnar Research Partners (R-AFFPA) | February 14–19, 2018 | 926 | ± 3.0% | 48% | 29% | – | 23% |
| WPA Intelligence (R-CDP PAC) | February 13–15, 2018 | 400 | ± 4.9% | 55% | 26% | – | 19% |
| Victory Phones (R-SCF) | February 12–13, 2018 | 600 | ± 4.0% | 49% | 26% | 9% | 16% |
| WPA Intelligence (R-Club for Growth) | January 14–15, 2018 | 502 | ± 4.4% | 63% | 25% | – | 12% |

| Poll source | Date(s) administered | Sample size | Margin of error | Bob Corker | Generic Opponent | Undecided |
|---|---|---|---|---|---|---|
| Triton/Tennessee Star | May 31 - June 5, 2018 | 1,007 | ± 3.1% | 41.6% | 41.6% | 17.3% |

=== Results ===
Results by county: Blackburn: Blackburn—70–80%; Blackburn—80–90%; Blackburn—90%

Republican primary results
| Party | Candidate | Votes | % |
|---|---|---|---|
| Republican | Marsha Blackburn | 613,513 | 84.48% |
| Republican | Aaron Pettigrew | 112,705 | 15.52% |
| Write-in | | 13 | <0.01% |
| Total votes | | 726,231 | 100.00% |

== Democratic primary ==
=== Candidates ===
==== Nominee ====
- Phil Bredesen, former governor of Tennessee and former mayor of Nashville

==== Eliminated in primary ====
- Gary Davis
- John Wolfe Jr., attorney and perennial candidate

==== Withdrawn ====
- Bill Bailey, teaching assistant and retired UPS trailer mechanic
- James Mackler, attorney and veteran

==== Declined ====
- Raumesh Akbari, state representative
- Megan Barry, former mayor of Nashville
- Andy Berke, mayor of Chattanooga
- John Ray Clemmons, state representative
- Jim Cooper, U.S. representative from Tennessee's 5th congressional district and nominee for U.S. Senate in 1994 special election (ran for re-election)
- Karl Dean, former mayor of Nashville (ran for governor)
- Craig Fitzhugh, minority leader of the Tennessee House of Representatives (ran for governor)
- Bill Freeman, businessman and candidate for mayor of Nashville in 2015
- Lee Harris, minority leader of the Tennessee Senate
- Tim McGraw, country musician, songwriter and actor
- Jeff Yarbro, state senator

=== Results ===
Results by county: Bredesen: Bredesen—80–90%; Bredesen—>90%

Democratic primary results
| Party | Candidate | Votes | % |
|---|---|---|---|
| Democratic | Phil Bredesen | 349,718 | 91.51% |
| Democratic | Gary Davis | 20,170 | 5.28% |
| Democratic | John Wolfe Jr. | 12,269 | 3.21% |
| Total votes | | 382,157 | 100.00% |

== Independents ==
=== Candidates ===
==== Declared ====
- Trudy Austin
- John Carico
- Dean Hill, US Army veteran, business owner, realtor
- Kevin Lee McCants
- Breton Phillips
- Kris L. Todd

== General election ==
=== Predictions ===
| Source | Ranking | As of |
|---|---|---|
| The Cook Political Report | Tossup | October 26, 2018 |
| Inside Elections | Lean R | November 1, 2018 |
| Sabato's Crystal Ball | Lean R | November 5, 2018 |
| NYT | Tossup | November 5, 2018 |
| Fox News | Lean R | November 5, 2018 |
| CNN | Tossup | November 5, 2018 |
| RealClearPolitics | Tossup | November 5, 2018 |
| Daily Kos | Lean R | November 5, 2018 |
| Politico | Lean R | November 5, 2018 |
| FiveThirtyEight | Likely R | November 5, 2018 |

=== Debates ===
- Complete video of debate, September 25, 2018
- Complete video of debate, October 10, 2018

=== Endorsements ===
Marsha Blackburn (R)

U.S. executive branch officials

- Mike Pence, vice president of the United States
- Condoleezza Rice, former secretary of state
- Donald Trump, president of the United States

U.S. senators

- Lamar Alexander, U.S. senator (R-TN)
- John Boozman, U.S. senator (R-AR)
- Tom Cotton, U.S. senator (R-AR)
- Joni Ernst, U.S. senator (R-IA)
- Deb Fischer, U.S. senator (R-NE)
- Lindsey Graham, U.S. senator (R-SC)
- David Perdue, U.S. senator (R-GA)
- Marco Rubio, U.S. senator (R-FL)
- Thom Tillis, U.S. senator (R-NC)

U.S. representatives

- Diane Black, U.S. representative (R-TN)
- Stephen Fincher, former U.S. representative (R-TN)
- David Kustoff, U.S. representative (R-TN)
- Steve Scalise, U.S. representative and House Majority Whip (R-LA)

Governors

- Winfield Dunn, former governor of Tennessee
- Bill Haslam, governor of Tennessee
- Ron Ramsey, former lieutenant governor of Tennessee
- Don Sundquist, former governor of Tennessee and former U.S. representative (R-TN)

Local and statewide politicians

- Paul Bailey, state senator
- Mike Bell, state senator
- Janice Bowling, state senator
- Joe Carr, former state representative
- Rusty Crowe, state senator
- Mark Green, state senator
- Dolores Gresham, state senator
- Ferrell Haile, state senator
- Jim Henry, former House Minority Leader
- Joey Hensley, state senator
- Jack Johnson, state senator
- Brian Kelsey, state senator
- Bill Ketron, state senator
- William Lamberth, state representative
- Jon Lundberg, state senator
- Becky Duncan Massey, state senator
- Randy McNally, state senator and Lieutenant Governor of Tennessee
- Frank Niceley, state senator
- Mark Pody, state senator
- Jay Reedy, state representative
- Kerry Roberts, state senator
- John Stevens, state senator
- Ken Yager, state senator
- Jason Zachary, state representative

Individuals

- Randy Boyd, candidate for governor
- Chris W. Cox, executive director of the NRA Institute for Legislative Action
- Diamond and Silk, social media personalities
- Lee Greenwood, country music artist
- Art Laffer, economist
- Tomi Lahren, political commentator
- Bill Lee, businessman and candidate for governor
- Ronna McDaniel, chairperson of the Republican National Committee
- Candace Owens, communications director for Turning Point USA
- Dave Ramsey, businessman and author
- Michael W. Smith, musician
- Eric Trump, son of President Donald Trump
- Darrell Waltrip, former NASCAR driver
- James Woods, actor
- Chuck Woolery, game show host, talk show host, and musician

Organizations

- American Conservative Union
- Citizens Against Government Waste
- Citizens United
- Club for Growth
- Maggie's List
- National Association of Home Builders
- National Federation of Independent Business
- National Right to Life
- NRA Political Victory Fund
- Senate Conservatives Fund
- Students For Trump
- Susan B. Anthony List
- Tennessee Police Benevolent Association
- Tennessee State Lodge of the Fraternal Order of Police
- U.S. Chamber of Commerce

Newspapers

- Chattanooga Free Press
Phil Bredesen (D)

U.S. executive branch officials

- Joe Biden, former vice president of the United States

U.S. senators

- Tammy Duckworth, U.S. senator (D-IL)
- Doug Jones, U.S senator (D-AL)
- Jeff Merkley, U.S. senator (D-OR)
- Brian Schatz, U.S. senator (D-HI)
- Ron Wyden, U.S. senator (D-OR)

U.S. representatives

- Terri Sewell, U.S. representative (AL-7)

Individuals

- Ben Folds, musician
- Jason Isbell, musician
- James Mackler, former candidate for U.S. Senate in 2018 and veteran
- Martin O'Malley, 61st governor of Maryland
- Amy Schumer, actress
- Amy Siskind, activist and writer
- Taylor Swift, musician (Note: Swift's October endorsement is reported to have helped increase the youth demographic's early voting in Tennessee by 664%)

Labor unions

- American Federation of Government Employees
- Tennessee AFL-CIO Labor Council
- United Automobile Workers

Organizations

- 314 Action
- Humane Society Legislative Fund
- League of Conservation Voters
- Sierra Club

Newspapers

- Chattanooga Times

=== Fundraising ===
Campaign finance reports as of Sep 30, 2018
| Candidate (party) | Total receipts | Total disbursements | Cash on hand |
|---|---|---|---|
| Marsha Blackburn (R) | $11,568,094 | $9,062,332 | $2,505,762 |
| Phil Bredesen (D) | $14,868,198 | $11,693,910 | $3,174,289 |
Source: Federal Election Commission

=== Polling ===
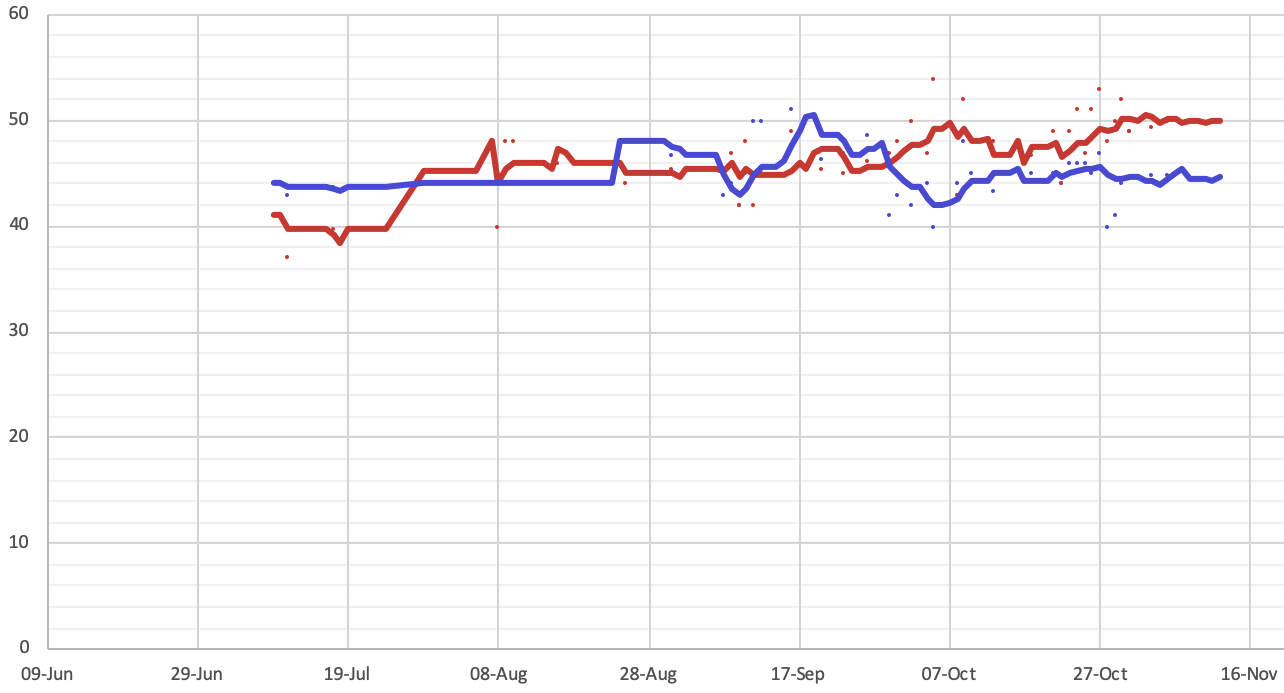

| Poll source | Date(s) administered | Sample size | Margin of error | Marsha Blackburn (R) | Phil Bredesen (D) | Other | Undecided |
|---|---|---|---|---|---|---|---|
| Targoz Market Research | October 28–31, 2018 | 480 | – | 49% | 49% | – | 2% |
| Emerson College | October 28–30, 2018 | 621 | ± 4.0% | 52% | 44% | 2% | 3% |
| FOX News | October 27–30, 2018 | 718 LV | ± 3.5% | 50% | 41% | 3% | 5% |
| FOX News | October 27–30, 2018 | 850 RV | ± 3.0% | 48% | 40% | 3% | 8% |
| Vox Populi Polling | October 27–29, 2018 | 780 | ± 3.5% | 53% | 47% | – | – |
| CNN/SSRS | October 24–29, 2018 | 764 LV | ± 4.3% | 49% | 45% | 0% | 3% |
| CNN/SSRS | October 24–29, 2018 | 871 RV | ± 4.0% | 47% | 46% | 0% | 4% |
| East Tennessee State University | October 22–29, 2018 | 495 | ± 4.4% | 44% | 44% | – | – |
| Cygnal (R) | October 26–27, 2018 | 497 | ± 4.4% | 51% | 45% | 1% | 4% |
| NBC News/Marist | October 23–27, 2018 | 471 LV | ± 5.7% | 51% | 46% | 1% | 3% |
| NBC News/Marist | October 23–27, 2018 | 764 RV | ± 4.4% | 49% | 46% | 1% | 3% |
| Vanderbilt University/SSRS | October 8–13, 2018 | 800 | ± 4.9% | 43% | 44% | 1% | 8% |
| Targoz Market Research | October 9–12, 2018 | 558 LV | – | 52% | 48% | – | – |
| Targoz Market Research | October 9–12, 2018 | 801 RV | – | 44% | 45% | – | 11% |
| NYT Upshot/Siena College | October 8–11, 2018 | 593 | ± 4.2% | 54% | 40% | – | 6% |
| Ipsos | October 4–11, 2018 | 1,108 | ± 3.4% | 47% | 44% | 3% | 6% |
| YouGov | October 2–5, 2018 | 871 | ± 3.6% | 50% | 42% | 2% | 6% |
| FOX News | September 29 – October 2, 2018 | 666 LV | ± 3.5% | 48% | 43% | 3% | 7% |
| FOX News | September 29 – October 2, 2018 | 806 RV | ± 3.5% | 47% | 41% | 3% | 8% |
| Garin-Hart-Yang (D-Bredesen) | September 23–25, 2018 | 600 | ± 4.0% | 45% | 47% | – | – |
| SurveyMonkey | September 9–24, 2018 | 1,609 | ± 3.3% | 42% | 42% | – | 15% |
| Vox Populi Polling | September 16–18, 2018 | 567 | ± 4.1% | 49% | 51% | – | – |
| CNN/SSRS | September 11–15, 2018 | 723 LV | ± 4.3% | 45% | 50% | 0% | 3% |
| CNN/SSRS | September 11–15, 2018 | 852 RV | ± 3.9% | 42% | 50% | 0% | 5% |
| Triton Polling & Research (R) | September 10–12, 2018 | 1,038 | ± 3.0% | 48% | 45% | – | 7% |
| FOX News | September 8–11, 2018 | 686 LV | ± 3.5% | 47% | 44% | 1% | 8% |
| FOX News | September 8–11, 2018 | 809 RV | ± 3.5% | 45% | 43% | 2% | 9% |
| NBC News/Marist | August 25–28, 2018 | 538 LV | ± 5.1% | 46% | 48% | <1% | 5% |
| NBC News/Marist | August 25–28, 2018 | 730 RV | ± 4.5% | 44% | 48% | <1% | 7% |
| Gravis Marketing | August 9–11, 2018 | 620 | ± 3.9% | 48% | 44% | – | 8% |
| Emerson College | July 11–14, 2018 | 657 | ± 4.1% | 37% | 43% | 5% | 17% |
| Public Policy Polling (D-Duty and Country Pac) | July 10–11, 2018 | 583 | ± 4.1% | 41% | 44% | – | 15% |
| WPA Intelligence (R-CDP PAC) | July 9–11, 2018 | 551 | ± 4.2% | 38% | 35% | – | 11% |
| SurveyMonkey/Axios | June 11 – July 2, 2018 | 1,010 | ± 4.5% | 55% | 41% | – | 4% |
| Public Policy Polling (D-Health Care Voter) | April 30 – May 1, 2018 | 609 | ± 4.0% | 43% | 46% | – | – |
| SurveyMonkey/Axios | April 2–23, 2018 | 1,638 | ± 4.0% | 47% | 48% | – | 5% |
| Mason-Dixon | April 17–19, 2018 | 625 | ± 4.0% | 43% | 46% | – | 11% |
| Garin-Hart-Yang (D-Bredesen) | April 9–11, 2018 | 601 | ± 4.0% | 41% | 51% | – | 8% |
| Middle Tennessee State University | March 22–29, 2018 | 600 | ± 4.0% | 35% | 45% | – | 17% |
| Public Policy Polling (D-Protect Our Care) | March 15–16, 2018 | 1,014 | ± 3.1% | 41% | 46% | – | 13% |
| WPA Intelligence (R-CDP PAC) | February 13–15, 2018 | 500 | ± 4.4% | 44% | 39% | – | 17% |
| Public Opinion Strategies (R) | January 26–29, 2018 | – | – | 45% | 47% | – | 8% |
| Triton Polling & Research (R) | January 21–24, 2018 | 1,003 | ± 3.1% | 51% | 40% | – | 10% |
| WPA Intelligence (R-CDP PAC) | December 13–14 & 17, 2017 | 500 | ± 4.4% | 43% | 34% | – | 23% |
| Gravis Marketing | December 11–12, 2017 | 563 | ± 4.1% | 40% | 42% | – | 18% |
| Garin-Hart-Yang (D-DSCC) | October 20–22, 2017 | 601 | ± 4.1% | 41% | 46% | – | 13% |

Hypothetical polling

with generic Republican and generic Democrat

| Poll source | Date(s) administered | Sample size | Margin of error | Generic Republican | Generic Democrat | Other | Undecided |
|---|---|---|---|---|---|---|---|
| Triton Polling & Research (R) | September 10–12, 2018 | 1,038 | ± 3.0% | 52% | 41% | – | 7% |
| Public Policy Polling (D-Protect Our Care) | March 15–16, 2018 | 1,014 | ± 3.1% | 51% | 41% | – | 8% |

with Bob Corker

| Poll source | Date(s) administered | Sample size | Margin of error | Bob Corker (R) | Phil Bredesen (D) | Undecided |
|---|---|---|---|---|---|---|
| WPA Intelligence (R-CDP PAC) | February 13–15, 2018 | 500 | ± 4.4% | 35% | 44% | 21% |

with Stephen Fincher

| Poll source | Date(s) administered | Sample size | Margin of error | Stephen Fincher (R) | Phil Bredesen (D) | Undecided |
|---|---|---|---|---|---|---|
| Triton Polling & Research (R) | January 21–24, 2018 | 1,004 | ± 3.1% | 38% | 42% | 20% |
| WPA Intelligence (R-CDP PAC) | December 13–14 and 17, 2017 | 500 | ± 4.4% | 30% | 42% | 28% |
| Gravis Marketing | December 11–12, 2017 | 563 | ± 4.1% | 38% | 42% | 20% |

with Clay Travis

| Poll source | Date(s) administered | Sample size | Margin of error | Marsha Blackburn (R) | Phil Bredesen (D) | Clay Travis (I) | Undecided |
|---|---|---|---|---|---|---|---|
| Triton Polling & Research (R) | January 21–24, 2018 | 1,004 | ± 3.1% | 48% | 37% | 6% | 10% |

| Poll source | Date(s) administered | Sample size | Margin of error | Stephen Fincher (R) | Phil Bredesen (D) | Clay Travis (I) | Undecided |
|---|---|---|---|---|---|---|---|
| Triton Polling & Research (R) | January 21–24, 2018 | 1,004 | ± 3.1% | 35% | 39% | 10% | 16% |

with Bob Corker and generic Democrat

| Poll source | Date(s) administered | Sample size | Margin of error | Bob Corker (R) | Generic Democrat | Undecided |
|---|---|---|---|---|---|---|
| Public Policy Polling (D-Our Lives on the Line) | August 11–13, 2017 | 663 | ± 3.6% | 47% | 37% | 16% |

with Peyton Manning

| Poll source | Date(s) administered | Sample size | Margin of error | Peyton Manning (R) | Phil Bredesen (D) | Undecided |
|---|---|---|---|---|---|---|
| Gravis Marketing | December 11–12, 2017 | 563 | ± 4.1% | 44% | 39% | 17% |

=== Results ===
On November 6, 2018, Blackburn defeated Bredesen in the general election, carrying all but three counties, the largest number of counties ever won in an open senate election in Tennessee. Although polls began to show the race in Blackburn's favor following the Kavanaugh hearings, Blackburn won by a larger margin than all but one poll showed.

County flips: Democratic Hold Flip / Republican Hold

2018 United States Senate election in Tennessee
| Party | Candidate | Votes | % | ±% |
|---|---|---|---|---|
| Republican | Marsha Blackburn | 1,227,483 | 54.71% | −10.18% |
| Democratic | Phil Bredesen | 985,450 | 43.92% | +13.51% |
| Independent | Trudy Austin | 9,455 | 0.42% | N/A |
| Independent | Dean Hill | 8,717 | 0.39% | N/A |
| Independent | Kris L. Todd | 5,084 | 0.23% | N/A |
| Independent | John Carico | 3,398 | 0.15% | N/A |
| Independent | Breton Phillips | 2,226 | 0.10% | N/A |
| Independent | Kevin Lee McCants | 1,927 | 0.09% | N/A |
| Total votes | | 2,243,740 | 100.00% | N/A |
| Republican hold | | | | |

==== By county ====
| County | Marsha Blackburn Republican | | Phil Bredesen Democratic | | Other votes | | Total votes |
| County | % | # | % | # | % | # | Total votes |
|---|---|---|---|---|---|---|---|
| Anderson | 56.60% | 14,720 | 41.59% | 10,818 | 1.81% | 470 | 26,008 |
| Bedford | 68.61% | 8,942 | 30.15% | 3,929 | 1.24% | 162 | 13,033 |
| Benton | 65.86% | 3,489 | 32.50% | 1,722 | 1.64% | 87 | 5,298 |
| Bledsoe | 71.34% | 2,908 | 26.89% | 1,096 | 1.77% | 72 | 4,076 |
| Blount | 63.97% | 29,928 | 34.29% | 16,040 | 1.74% | 814 | 46,782 |
| Bradley | 71.96% | 24,433 | 26.59% | 9,030 | 1.45% | 491 | 33,954 |
| Campbell | 71.04% | 7,208 | 26.73% | 2,712 | 2.24% | 227 | 10,147 |
| Cannon | 68.83% | 3,198 | 29.72% | 1,381 | 1.44% | 67 | 4,646 |
| Carroll | 68.85% | 6,044 | 29.68% | 2,606 | 1.47% | 129 | 8,779 |
| Carter | 74.61% | 13,946 | 24.32% | 4,547 | 1.07% | 200 | 18,693 |
| Cheatham | 63.21% | 9,135 | 35.64% | 5,150 | 1.15% | 167 | 14,452 |
| Chester | 72.33% | 3,902 | 24.91% | 1,344 | 2.76% | 149 | 5,395 |
| Claiborne | 71.60% | 6,083 | 26.42% | 2,245 | 1.98% | 168 | 8,496 |
| Clay | 64.20% | 1,643 | 34.04% | 871 | 1.76% | 45 | 2,559 |
| Cocke | 72.51% | 7,528 | 25.25% | 2,621 | 2.24% | 233 | 10,382 |
| Coffee | 65.28% | 11,115 | 32.73% | 5,572 | 1.99% | 339 | 17,026 |
| Crockett | 66.44% | 2,984 | 31.57% | 1,418 | 1.99% | 89 | 4,491 |
| Cumberland | 71.26% | 16,966 | 26.55% | 6,321 | 2.19% | 521 | 23,808 |
| Davidson | 28.46% | 69,338 | 70.65% | 172,137 | 0.89% | 2,164 | 243,639 |
| Decatur | 70.09% | 2,718 | 27.85% | 1,080 | 2.06% | 80 | 3,878 |
| DeKalb | 65.60% | 3,906 | 33.32% | 1,984 | 1.08% | 64 | 5,954 |
| Dickson | 62.66% | 10,465 | 35.88% | 5,992 | 1.46% | 243 | 16,700 |
| Dyer | 72.10% | 8,013 | 26.08% | 2,898 | 1.83% | 203 | 11,114 |
| Fayette | 66.02% | 11,371 | 32.74% | 5,639 | 1.24% | 214 | 17,224 |
| Fentress | 74.88% | 4,745 | 22.72% | 1,440 | 2.40% | 152 | 6,337 |
| Franklin | 64.49% | 8,981 | 34.29% | 4,776 | 1.22% | 170 | 13,927 |
| Gibson | 64.34% | 10,407 | 33.10% | 5,353 | 2.56% | 414 | 16,174 |
| Giles | 66.63% | 6,403 | 32.07% | 3,082 | 1.30% | 125 | 9,610 |
| Grainger | 73.99% | 5,039 | 24.35% | 1,658 | 1.66% | 113 | 6,810 |
| Greene | 72.45% | 14,844 | 26.34% | 5,398 | 1.21% | 248 | 20,490 |
| Grundy | 68.84% | 2,587 | 29.30% | 1,101 | 1.86% | 70 | 3,758 |
| Hamblen | 69.71% | 12,134 | 28.56% | 4,972 | 1.73% | 301 | 17,407 |
| Hamilton | 50.22% | 67,152 | 48.70% | 65,119 | 1.08% | 1,437 | 133,708 |
| Hancock | 74.55% | 1,327 | 23.71% | 422 | 1.74% | 31 | 1,780 |
| Hardeman | 51.35% | 3,869 | 47.25% | 3,560 | 1.40% | 106 | 7,535 |
| Hardin | 74.96% | 6,181 | 23.25% | 1,971 | 1.79% | 148 | 8,300 |
| Hawkins | 74.74% | 13,058 | 24.17% | 4,222 | 1.09% | 191 | 17,471 |
| Haywood | 40.16% | 2,364 | 58.60% | 3,449 | 1.24% | 73 | 5,886 |
| Henderson | 75.30% | 6,514 | 23.40% | 2,024 | 1.30% | 113 | 8,651 |
| Henry | 66.28% | 7,190 | 32.24% | 3,497 | 1.48% | 161 | 10,848 |
| Hickman | 65.35% | 4,563 | 32.74% | 2,286 | 1.91% | 133 | 6,982 |
| Houston | 58.85% | 1,613 | 39.40% | 1,078 | 1.65% | 45 | 2,736 |
| Humphreys | 60.23% | 3,549 | 38.42% | 2,264 | 1.35% | 79 | 5,892 |
| Jackson | 64.08% | 2,514 | 34.69% | 1,361 | 1.23% | 48 | 3,923 |
| Jefferson | 70.96% | 11,435 | 26.98% | 4,347 | 2.06% | 332 | 16,114 |
| Johnson | 76.64% | 4,520 | 22.06% | 1,301 | 1.30% | 77 | 5,898 |
| Knox | 50.80% | 84,407 | 47.71% | 79,283 | 1.49% | 2,472 | 166,162 |
| Lake | 64.09% | 930 | 33.77% | 490 | 2.14% | 31 | 1,451 |
| Lauderdale | 56.14% | 3,745 | 42.12% | 2,810 | 1.74% | 116 | 6,671 |
| Lawrence | 72.22% | 9,365 | 26.52 | 3,439 | 1.26% | 164 | 12,968 |
| Lewis | 69.96% | 2,836 | 29.03% | 1,177 | 1.01% | 41 | 4,054 |
| Lincoln | 75.40% | 7,949 | 23.12% | 2,437 | 1.48% | 156 | 10,542 |
| Loudon | 68.66% | 14,834 | 29.49% | 6,371 | 1.85% | 400 | 21,605 |
| Macon | 75.11% | 4,768 | 23.36% | 1,483 | 1.53% | 97 | 6,348 |
| Madison | 52.05% | 17,127 | 46.54% | 15,316 | 1.41% | 464 | 32,907 |
| Marion | 63.65% | 5,839 | 34.51% | 3,166 | 1.84% | 168 | 9,173 |
| Marshall | 65.16% | 6,543 | 33.66% | 3,380 | 1.18% | 118 | 10,041 |
| Maury | 60.10% | 19,569 | 38.58% | 12,560 | 1.32% | 430 | 32,559 |
| McMinn | 72.28% | 11,434 | 26.06% | 4,122 | 1.66% | 263 | 15,819 |
| McNairy | 73.36% | 6,007 | 24.87% | 2,036 | 1.77% | 145 | 8,188 |
| Meigs | 70.99% | 2,694 | 27.40% | 1,040 | 1.61% | 61 | 3,795 |
| Monroe | 71.05% | 10,274 | 26.54% | 3,838 | 2.41% | 348 | 14,460 |
| Montgomery | 49.98% | 25,932 | 47.81% | 24,807 | 2.21% | 1,148 | 51,887 |
| Moore | 74.12% | 1,856 | 24.40% | 611 | 1.48% | 37 | 2,504 |
| Morgan | 72.39% | 4,083 | 25.46% | 1,436 | 2.15% | 121 | 5,640 |
| Obion | 74.46% | 7,118 | 24.33% | 2,326 | 1.20% | 115 | 9,559 |
| Overton | 64.49% | 4,640 | 34.08% | 2,452 | 1.43% | 103 | 7,195 |
| Perry | 67.60% | 1,644 | 29.77% | 724 | 2.63% | 64 | 2,432 |
| Pickett | 70.44% | 1,599 | 28.46% | 646 | 1.10% | 25 | 2,270 |
| Polk | 70.92% | 4,127 | 27.24% | 1,585 | 1.84% | 107 | 5,819 |
| Putnam | 62.59% | 15,230 | 35.96% | 8,750 | 1.45% | 353 | 24,333 |
| Rhea | 72.95% | 6,866 | 25.19% | 2,371 | 1.86% | 175 | 9,412 |
| Roane | 65.81% | 12,727 | 32.28% | 6,242 | 1.91% | 371 | 19,340 |
| Robertson | 64.30% | 15,501 | 34.47% | 8,311 | 1.23% | 297 | 24,109 |
| Rutherford | 52.72% | 52,254 | 46.10% | 45,692 | 1.18% | 1,179 | 99,125 |
| Scott | 76.93% | 4,232 | 21.38% | 1,176 | 1.69% | 93 | 5,501 |
| Sequatchie | 71.04% | 3,564 | 27.25% | 1,367 | 1.71% | 86 | 5,017 |
| Sevier | 71.60% | 21,541 | 25.82% | 7,769 | 2.58% | 774 | 30,084 |
| Shelby | 33.14% | 96,493 | 65.56% | 190,885 | 1.30% | 3,767 | 291,145 |
| Smith | 66.25% | 4,317 | 32.40% | 2,111 | 1.35% | 88 | 6,516 |
| Stewart | 65.36% | 2,938 | 33.19% | 1,492 | 1.45% | 65 | 4,495 |
| Sullivan | 71.12% | 38,753 | 27.86% | 15,183 | 1.02% | 557 | 54,493 |
| Sumner | 62.68% | 41,099 | 36.24% | 23,762 | 1.08% | 704 | 65,565 |
| Tipton | 69.05% | 13,390 | 29.01% | 5,625 | 1.94% | 378 | 19,393 |
| Trousdale | 60.35% | 1,586 | 38.13% | 1,002 | 1.52% | 40 | 2,628 |
| Unicoi | 74.19% | 4,659 | 24.75% | 1,554 | 1.06% | 67 | 6,280 |
| Union | 71.52% | 3,739 | 26.43% | 1,382 | 2.05% | 107 | 5,228 |
| Van Buren | 65.75% | 1,451 | 32.22% | 711 | 2.03% | 45 | 2,207 |
| Warren | 61.46% | 7,018 | 36.78% | 4,200 | 1.76% | 201 | 11,419 |
| Washington | 63.08% | 28,514 | 35.94% | 16,246 | 0.98% | 441 | 45,201 |
| Wayne | 79.96% | 3,787 | 19.13% | 906 | 0.91% | 43 | 4,736 |
| Weakley | 67.71% | 6,704 | 30.77% | 3,047 | 1.52% | 150 | 9,901 |
| White | 70.98% | 5,979 | 27.22% | 2,293 | 1.80% | 151 | 8,423 |
| Williamson | 58.88% | 62,039 | 40.44% | 42,611 | 0.68% | 719 | 105,369 |
| Wilson | 61.84% | 32,810 | 36.66% | 19,447 | 1.50% | 797 | 53,054 |

==== Counties that flipped from Republican to Democratic ====
- Davidson (largest city: Nashville)

State Senate district results (24–9)

State House district results (70–29)

==== By congressional district ====
Blackburn won seven of nine congressional districts.

| District | Blackburn | Bredesen | Representative |
|---|---|---|---|
| 1st | 70.56% | 28.06% | Phil Roe |
| 2nd | 56.86% | 41.53% | Jimmy Duncan (115th Congress) |
| 2nd | 56.86% | 41.53% | Tim Burchett (116th Congress) |
| 3rd | 58.47% | 40.07% | Chuck Fleischmann |
| 4th | 61.30% | 37.34% | Scott DesJarlais |
| 5th | 31.87% | 67.20% | Jim Cooper |
| 6th | 64.90% | 33.64% | Diane Black (115th Congress) |
| 6th | 64.90% | 33.64% | John Rose (116th Congress) |
| 7th | 60.85% | 37.81% | Marsha Blackburn (115th Congress) |
| 7th | 60.85% | 37.81% | Mark Green (116th Congress) |
| 8th | 61.65% | 36.92% | David Kustoff |
| 9th | 18.78% | 79.82% | Steve Cohen |

==== By Grand Division ====
Results by Grand Division Blackburn: 50–60% 60–70% Bredesen: 50–60%

Blackburn won Middle and East Tennessee while Bredesen won West Tennessee, which Bob Corker had carried in 2012.

| Grand Division | Blackburn | Bredesen |
|---|---|---|
| West | 45.98% | 52.57% |
| Middle | 52.52% | 46.27% |
| East | 62.43% | 36.05% |

== See also ==
- Elections in Tennessee
- Political party strength in Tennessee
- Tennessee Democratic Party
- Tennessee Republican Party
- Government of Tennessee
- 2018 Tennessee gubernatorial election
- 2018 Tennessee elections
- 2018 United States elections
