= Clark Boyd (politician) =

American politician (born 1978)

Majority Whip of the Tennessee House of Representatives

Member of the Tennessee House of Representatives from the 46th district
- Incumbent
- Assumed office January 10, 2018
- Preceded by: Mark Pody

Personal details
- Born: June 14, 1978 (age 48) Georgia, U.S.
- Party: Republican
- Children: 2
- Education: East Tennessee State University (BS)
- Website: House website

Clark Boyd (born June 14, 1978) is an American politician and a Republican member of the Tennessee House of Representatives, representing the 46th district since January 2018.

== Early life and education ==
Boyd was born June 14, 1978, in Georgia. He has been married to his wife Jada for 17 years and has two kids, Wilson and Blair Ellen, and they are all members of Immanuel Baptist Church in Lebanon. He went to East Tennessee State University and has a Bachelor of Science degree in Human Development and Learning with a Minor in Military Science. Alongside being very active in his church, serving as a deacon and a Sunday School teacher for newly married couples, Boyd is the owner of a State Farm Insurance agency in Lebanon. Boyd was also a former Captain of the US Army Reserve with 11 years of service in the US Army and Army National Guard.

== Career ==
=== Community involvement ===
As is listed out on his page in the Tennessee General Assembly, Boyd is involved with the following activities: House member of the 110th and 111th General Assemblies, Former President of the Rotary Club of Lebanon, Lebanon/Wilson County Chamber of Commerce, Former President of the Wilson County Habitat For Humanity, Living Sent Ministries Board Member, National Association of Insurance and Financial Advisors, Deacon and Sunday School Teacher at Immanuel Baptist Church, the National Rifle Association of America, Leadership Wilson.

=== Politics ===
Boyd first ran for office in 2014, when he challenged Mae Beavers in the Republican primary for Tennessee's 17th Senate district, losing with 40.7% of the vote. Following State Representative Mark Pody's election to the Tennessee Senate, Boyd was appointed by the Wilson County Commission to serve the remainder of Pody's term. He ran against Menda McCall Holmes in the 2018 Republican primary election, winning 84% of the votes, 9,208 votes. He then advanced to the general election, where he beat Mark Cagle on November 6, 2018, by winning 72.9% of the votes, 17,602 votes. Boyd was elected in 2018 and is representative for the 46th district, which if over Cannon County and includes part of Wilson and DeKalb Counties. As listed out on Vote Smart, he is a member of many committees, as well as Chair over the Consumer and Human Resources Committee. And, in the 111th General Assembly, he sponsored 37 bills and cosponsored 59 bills.

In 2023, Boyd supported a resolution to expel three Democratic lawmakers from the legislature for violating decorum rules. The expulsion was widely characterized as unprecedented.
