= Rolando Toyos =

American ophtamologist

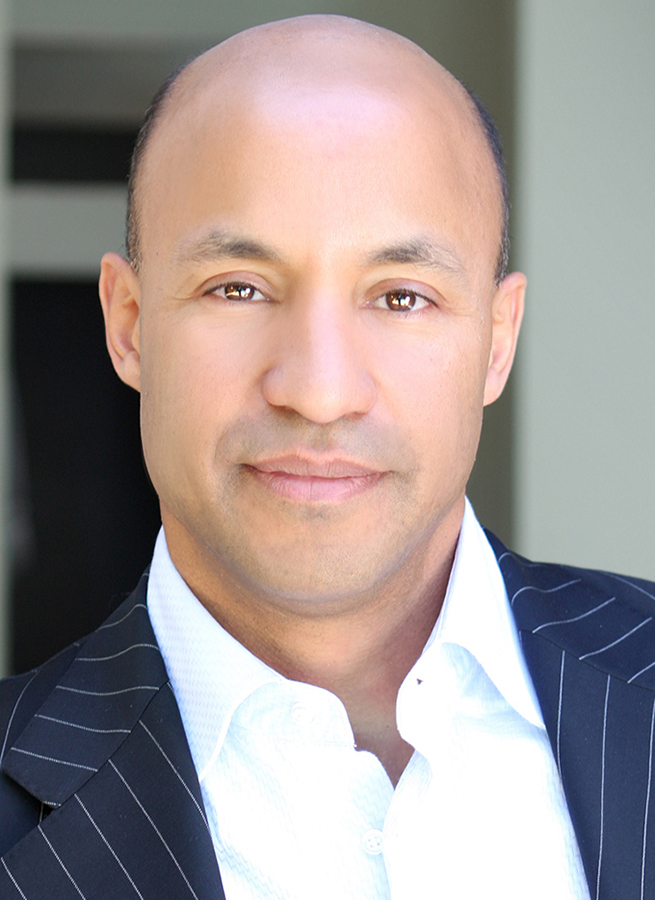
- Born: New York City, U.S.
- Education: University of California, Berkeley; Northwestern University; Stanford University
- Years active: 1998–present
- Medical career
- Profession: Medical director; Founder of Toyos Clinic
- Field: Ophthalmology
- Sub-specialties: Cataract surgery and refractive procedures

Rolando Toyos is an American physician and medical director who specializes in ophthalmology. He developed the use of intense pulsed light (IPL) for the treatment of dry eye conditions such as meibomian gland dysfunction. Based out of Tennessee, Toyos specializes in cataract surgery and refractive procedures. He is also a sports ophthalmologist and the official eye doctor of the Memphis Grizzlies and the Memphis Redbirds (a Triple-A baseball team). In 2018, Toyos was briefly a candidate for U.S. Senate in Tennessee.

== Early life and education ==
Rolando Toyos, the son of a Cuban father (Joaquin L. Toyos) and a Dominican mother (Binnie Batista), grew up in California, where he attended Santa Rosa High School. He received his Bachelor of Arts degree from the University of California, Berkeley in 1988 and then obtained his master's degree from Stanford University. He later attended the University of Illinois College of Medicine for his medical degree. At Illinois, Toyos was class president and graduated with James Scholar Academic Honors in 1994. Toyos went on to study ophthalmology at Northwestern University and graduated in 1998.

== Career ==
Toyos originally started his career as a full-time teacher in California. Prior to going to medical school, Toyos worked as a high school teacher and basketball coach. During that time, he received the National Teaching Award for his science curriculum development.

In the late 1990s, Toyos moved to Tennessee to direct a neonatal intensive care unit at Jackson-Madison County General Hospital. Shortly after, he established his own practice, Toyos Clinic. The first Toyos Clinic opened in Jackson, Tennessee, in 1998 as an ophthalmology practice specializing in ophthalmic disease diagnosis and surgical treatment.

In 2002, Toyos started investigating the use of intense pulsed light (IPL) techniques that were being used to treat rosacea after patients were reporting improvements in dry eyes. Since then, Toyos has developed the use of IPL to treat chronic dry eye conditions such as meibomian gland dysfunction. After studying the use of IPL procedures as chronic dry eye treatment for over five years, Toyos began administering the treatment to patients in 2008.

By 2005, Toyos Clinic was operating three locations and generating approximately $3.6 million in revenue. That year, Toyos was recognized by Inc. Magazine as one of the 500 fastest-growing companies in the country. He opened a fourth clinic location in 2012 and performs approximately 1,000 LASIK procedures and 2,000 cataract surgeries on average annually. For his work as CEO of the Toyos Clinic, Inside Memphis Business magazine named Toyos 2016 CEO of the Year for companies with 50-100 employees.

Additionally, Toyos is an eye doctor for multiple professional sports teams. He is the official ophthalmologist for the Memphis Grizzlies and the Memphis Redbirds, the St. Louis Cardinals' Triple-A baseball team.

Toyos travels internationally to lecture on surgical techniques, technologies, and medicines. In 2005, he and several other colleagues founded the Sports Ophthalmic Society of the Americas (SOSA) to establish ophthalmic standards of care for athletes in the professional sports industry. Toyos has served as president of SOSA since its founding. He also volunteers at Eye Care America and sits on the board of Ballet Memphis.

== 2018 U.S. Senate election ==
In October 2017, Toyos announced that he was running as a Republican candidate for the vacant U.S. Senate seat in Tennessee. Describing himself as a "Reagan Republican", Toyos dropped out after being removed from the ballot by the Tennessee Republican Party's state executive committee. Toyos remained active in Republican politics following his withdrawal from the race, and would later travel to Oak Ridge, Tennessee to endorse Chuck Fleischmann's congressional campaign.

== Books ==
Toyos has authored several books, including The Insider's Guide to Medical School Admissions in 1997. In 2015, he published The Life and Times of a Sports Ophthalmologist, a book of stories about eye issues of professional athletes that Toyos has encountered in his career as an eye surgeon. In 2016, he published Dry Eye Disease Treatment in the Year 2020, about his history of treating dry eye syndrome and possibilities for treating the disease in the near-future.

== Philanthropy ==
While attending the University of Illinois, Toyos established a tutoring program for local Chicago public school students that wanted to pursue a medical career. Toyos received a community service award for helping the Chicago City Public Schools.

Following Hurricane Katrina, Toyos offered eye care to evacuees relocating in Memphis. His efforts were later acknowledged with the Humanitarian Award from the Jazz Foundation of America at the Apollo Theater in New York City in 2008.

== Personal life ==
Toyos and his wife Melissa Toyos, an ophthalmic surgeon and cosmetic facial surgeon, live in Brentwood, Tennessee, and have three children.

== See also ==
- Ophthalmology
- Dry eye
- Intense pulse light
