= Mae Beavers =

American politician (born 1947)

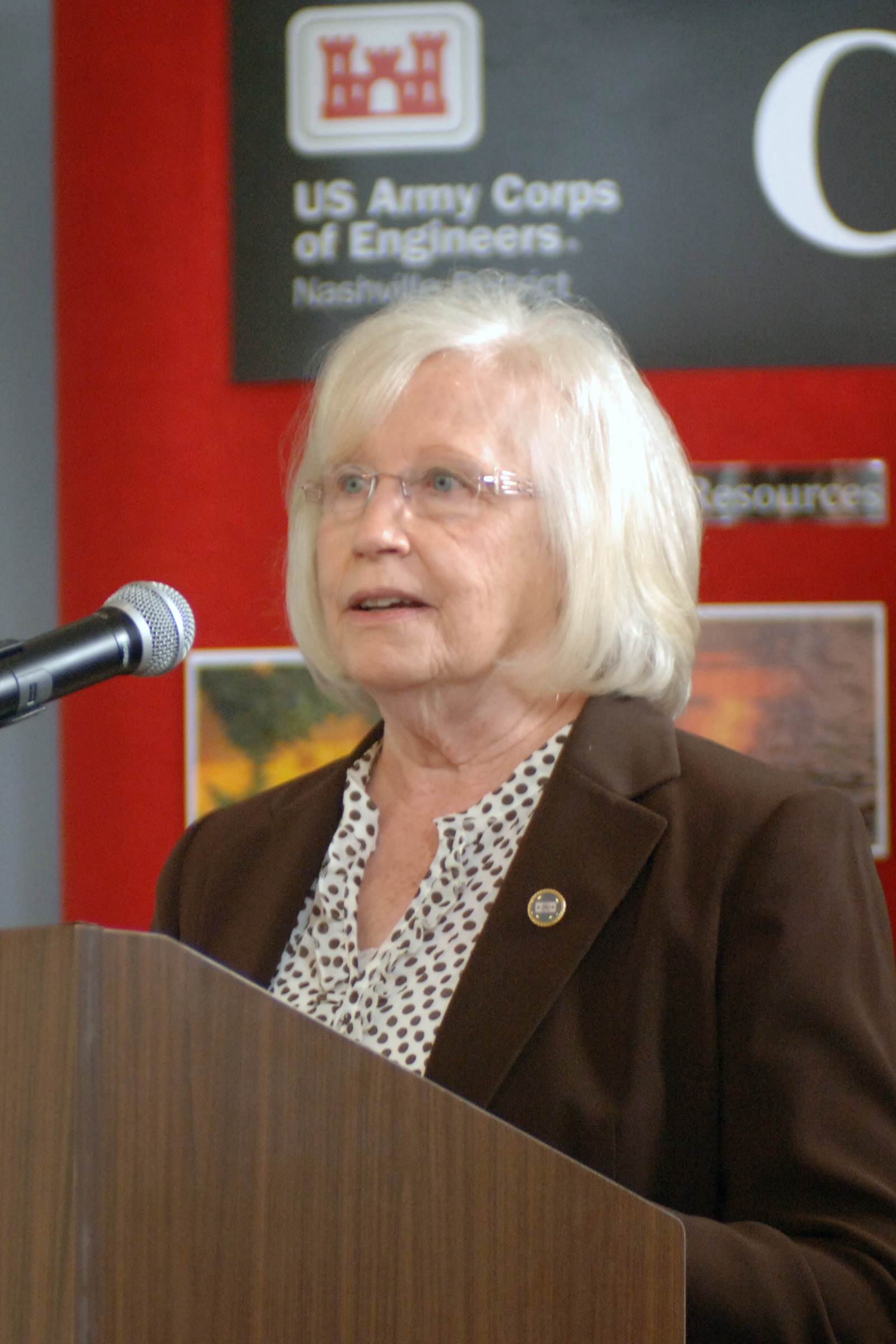
- Mae Beavers in 2012

Member of the Tennessee Senate from the 17th district
- In office January 8, 2003 – September 1, 2017
- Preceded by: Robert Rochelle
- Succeeded by: Mark Pody

Member of the Tennessee House of Representatives from the 57th district
- In office January 10, 1995 – January 8, 2003
- Succeeded by: Susan Lynn

Personal details
- Born: December 11, 1947 (age 78) Millport, Alabama, U.S.
- Party: Republican
- Spouse: Jerry Beavers
- Education: Trevecca Nazarene University
- Occupation: Politician
- Website: www.maebeavers.com

Mae Beavers (born December 11, 1947, in Millport, Alabama) is an American politician. A Republican, she was a member of the Tennessee Senate for the 17th district from 2003 until she resigned to run for governor in August 2017. The 17th district was composed of Cannon, Clay, DeKalb, Macon, Smith, and Wilson counties. Before becoming a state senator, Beavers was a state representative in the 99th through the 102nd General Assemblies. She was an unsuccessful candidate for Governor of Tennessee in the 2018 Tennessee gubernatorial election.

== Early life ==
Mae Beavers was born on December 11, 1947, in Millport, Alabama. She graduated from Trevecca Nazarene University, where she received a Bachelor of science degree. She also attended the Nashville School of Law and worked as a court reporter and financial advisor.

== Political career ==
Beavers has represented the Wilson County Commission (1990–1994), in the State House of Representatives (1994–2002), and in the State Senate (2002–2017). Lieutenant Governor and Speaker of the Senate Ron Ramsey credited her first election to the State Senate as the beginning of the conversion of the suburbs of Nashville from Democratic allegiance to Republican allegiance. Former Democratic State Senator Bob Rochelle attempted to reclaim his seat and ran against Beavers in the 2006 general election, yet Beavers prevailed with approximately 58% of the vote. In 2010, Beavers defeated her long-time political rival, State Representative Susan Lynn, in the 2010 Republican primary, and defeated Democrat George McDonald with approximately 63% of the vote in the general election.

Beavers opposes abortion and supports gun rights. She supported President Donald Trump's travel ban, supports the abolition of state income taxation, and is a proponent of tougher laws and measures against illegal immigrants. Beavers has also supported legislation in opposition to the Supreme Court's ruling on same-sex marriage.

In 2014, Beavers was rated by the Sunlight Foundation as the second-most conservative state senator in Tennessee, behind then-senator Stacey Campfield. She also leads the Wilson County Conservatives. Beavers is a member of the National Rifle Association of America and a lifetime member of the Tennessee Firearms Association.

On December 26, 2019, Beavers was appointed by Governor Bill Lee to serve on the state Board of Parole for a six-year term.

=== Sponsored legislation ===
Beavers was a proponent of the Tennessee Women's Ultrasound Right to Know Act, and sponsored SB 1769, SB 775, and co-sponsored SB 632, Both bills failed to pass.

Beavers opposed the 2010 health care reform legislation proposals, including the Patient Protection and Affordable Care Act, sponsoring instead the Tennessee Health Freedom Act to protect "a citizen's right to participate, or not participate, in any healthcare system".

In September 2015, Beavers proposed bill SB1437, known as the Tennessee Natural Marriage Defense Act, to ban same-sex marriage in Tennessee despite the Supreme Court's decision to legalize it. Her colleague in the House, Mark Pody, proposed a similar bill. After just 90 minutes of testimony, the House Civil Justice Committee rejected that bill. Had the bill passed, it would have cost Tennessee upwards of $8.5 billion in federal funding, in addition to millions of dollars in legal bills, mostly impacting programs that support Tennessee families in need such as the Supplemental Nutrition Assistance Program (SNAP), and Temporary Assistance for Needy Families (TANF).

In the next legislative session, Beavers and Pody reintroduced the bill, with specific language that no court decision (presumably including those of the Supreme Court of the United States) would affect it.

== 2018 gubernatorial and mayoral elections ==
Beavers started her campaign for governor of Tennessee on June 3, 2017. She was the fourth Republican to announce their campaign for the open seat.

In July 2017, Beavers' campaign raised $36,000. Her campaign was the third-most funded Republican campaign. The top two most-funded Republican campaigns were businessman Randy Boyd ($2.3 million) and businessman Bill Lee ($1.37 million).

On September 1, 2017, Beavers resigned her spot in the state senate to focus fully on her campaign. Mark Pody won a special election to assume Beavers' senate seat.

In January 2018, Trevecca Nazarene University blocked an event organized by Beavers that was scheduled to feature Cathy Hinners, John Guandolo and Bill Warner, amid strong criticism from advocacy groups that its speakers were anti-Muslim.

On January 30, 2018, Beavers announced that she would be stepping out of the 2018 Tennessee gubernatorial race.

In March 2018, Beavers announced her candidacy in the Wilson County mayoral election. She was defeated in this race, and was elected chair of the Wilson County Republican Party the following year.

== Personal life ==
Beavers is married to Jerry Beavers, with whom she has two children. They attend Music City Baptist Church.

Tennessee Senate
Preceded by Robert Rochelle	Member of the Tennessee Senate from District 17; 2002–2017	Succeeded by Vacant
