= Robert Rochelle =

American politician (born 1945)

Member of the Tennessee Senate from the 17th district
- In office 1982 – January 8, 2003

Personal details
- Born: November 25, 1945 (age 80)
- Education: Middle Tennessee State University; University of Tennessee College of Law
- Occupation: Lawyer

Robert Rochelle (born November 25, 1945) is an American lawyer and former Democratic politician. He served as a member of the Tennessee Senate from 1982 to 2002.

== Early life ==
Robert Rochelle was born on November 25, 1945, in Nashville, Tennessee. He graduated from Middle Tennessee State University with a bachelor of science degree in 1968, and earned a juris doctor from the University of Tennessee College of Law in 1969. Following law school, Rochelle served in the Army during the Vietnam War where he was awarded a bronze star and oak leaf cluster for his service.

== Career ==
=== Political career ===
Rochelle served as a Democratic member of the Tennessee Senate from 1982 to 2002. He served as Speaker Pro Tempore for a majority of his time in the State Senate, as well as in several other leadership capacities.

=== Legal career ===
Rochelle co-founded the law firm Rochelle, McCulloch & Aulds with Jere McCulloch and Jo Ann Aulds in 1987. By 2016, it was "the largest law firm in Wilson County with 12 attorneys, more than 20 staff members and offices in Lebanon and Mt. Juliet."

== Personal life ==
With his wife Janice, Rochelle has two children. They reside in Lebanon, Tennessee. He is a Methodist.
