= Tennessee's 17th Senate district =

American legislative district

Tennessee's 17th State Senate district
Senator
| Mark Pody; R–Lebanon |
- Demographics: 73% White; 14% Black; 7% Hispanic; 2% Asian; 1% Other; 3% Multiracial
- Population (2022): 217,807

Tennessee's 17th Senate district is one of 33 districts in the Tennessee Senate. It has been represented by Republican Mark Pody since a 2017 special election to replace fellow Republican Mae Beavers.

== Geography ==
District 17 covers rural and suburban and urban Middle Tennessee. It covers all of Wilson and the eastern part of Davidson County. Communities in the district includes Mount Juliet, Lebanon, Green Hill and part of Nashville.

The district is located within Tennessee's 5th and 6th congressional districts. The Nashville International Airport is mostly located within the district.

== Recent election results ==
Tennessee Senators are elected to staggered four-year terms, with odd-numbered districts holding elections in midterm years and even-numbered districts holding elections in presidential years.

== Previous results (2012–2022) ==
=== 2022 ===
Tennessee State Senate District 17, Republican primary, 2022
| Party | Candidate | Votes | % | ±% |
|---|---|---|---|---|
| Republican | Mark Pody (incumbent) | 13,161 | 100.00 | |
| Total votes | | 39,381 | 100 | |

Mark Pody ran unopposed in the Republican primary. No Democratic primary was held.

Tennessee State Senate District 17, general election, 2022
| Party | Candidate | Votes | % | ±% |
|---|---|---|---|---|
| Republican | 'Mark Pody' (incumbent) | 39,381 | 100.00 | |
| Total votes | | 39,381 | 100 | |

Incumbent Republican Mark Pody ran for re-election unopposed in the general election, winning a second full term.

=== 2018 ===
2018 Tennessee Senate election, District 17
| Party | Candidate | Votes | % |
|---|---|---|---|
| Republican | Mark Pody (incumbent) | 53,364 | 70.4 |
| Democratic | Mary Alice Carfi | 22,452 | 29.6 |
| Total votes | | 75,816 | 100 |
| Republican hold | | | |

=== 2017 special ===
In August 2017, incumbent Republican Mae Beavers resigned to focus on her ultimately unsuccessful gubernatorial campaign, triggering a special election that December.

2017 Tennessee Senate special election, District 17
| Party | Candidate | Votes | % |
|---|---|---|---|
| Republican | Mark Pody | 5,995 | 51.3 |
| Democratic | Mary Alice Carfi | 5,688 | 48.7 |
| Total votes | | 11,683 | 100 |
| Republican hold | | | |

=== 2014 ===
2014 Tennessee Senate election, District 17
Primary election
| Party | Candidate | Votes | % |
|---|---|---|---|
| Republican | Mae Beavers (incumbent) | 16,177 | 59.3 |
| Republican | Clark Boyd | 11,104 | 40.7 |
| Total votes | | 27,281 | 100 |
General election
| Republican | Mae Beavers (incumbent) | 35,454 | 100 |
| Total votes | | 35,454 | 100 |
| Republican hold | | | |

=== Federal and statewide results ===
| Year | Office | Results |
|---|---|---|
| 2020 | President | Trump 71.9 – 26.1% |
| 2016 | President | Trump 72.2 – 23.8% |
| 2012 | President | Romney 69.1 – 29.5% |
| 2012 | Senate | Corker 73.3 – 22.1% |
