= 2018 Tennessee gubernatorial election =

- November 6, 2018
- Turnout: 54.46% ▲20.49 pp
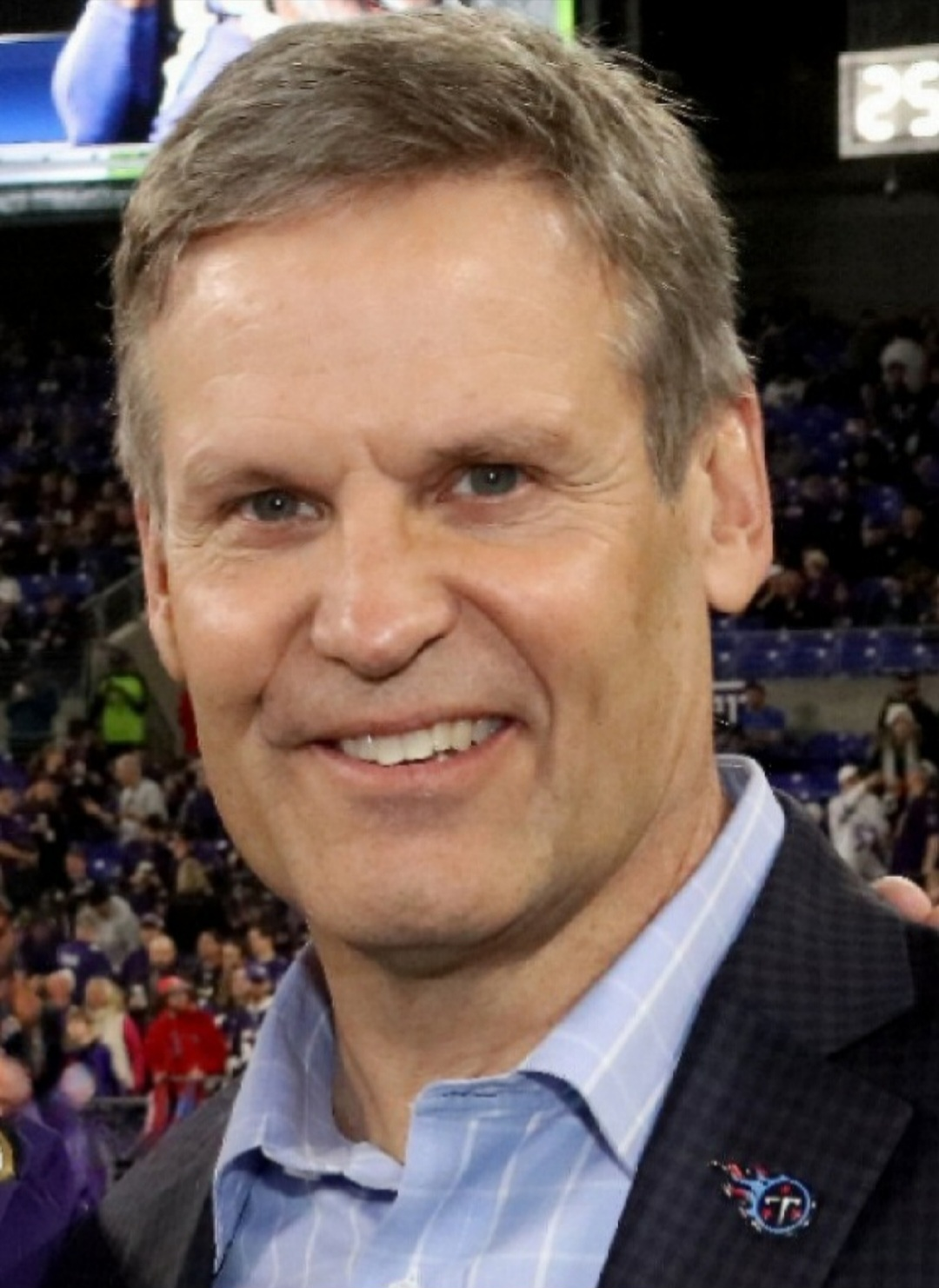

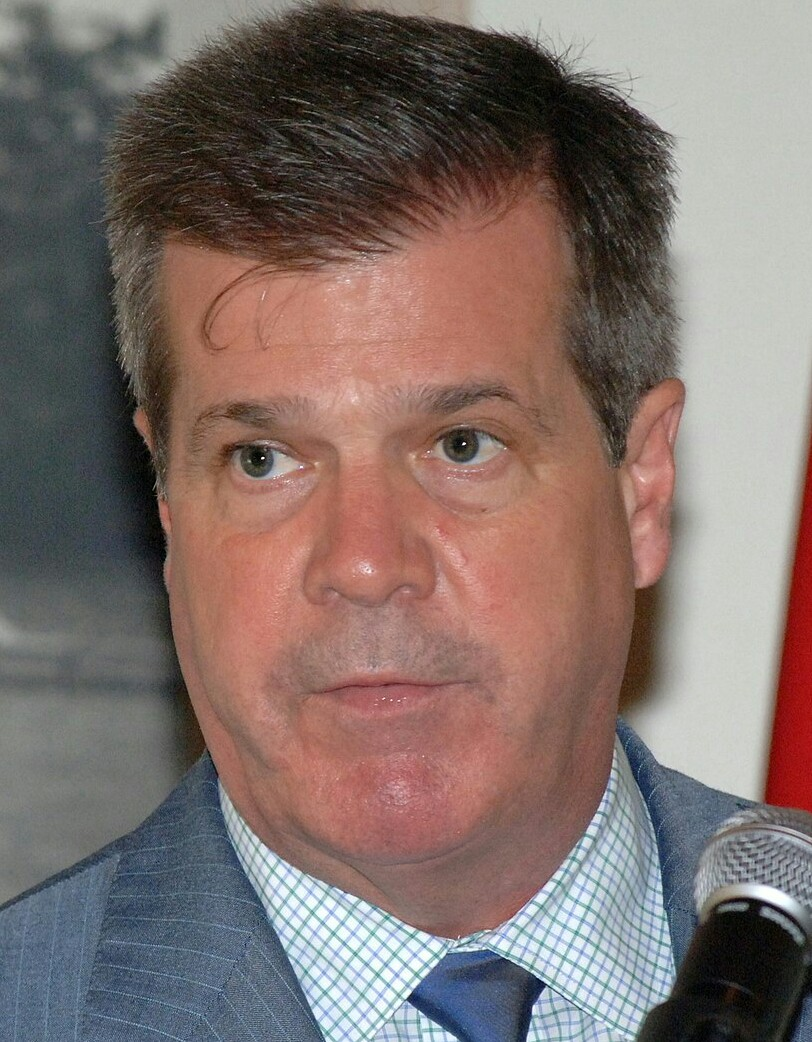
Nominee	Bill Lee	Karl Dean
Party	Republican	Democratic
Popular vote	1,336,106	864,863
Percentage	59.56%	38.55%
- Lee: 40–50% 50–60% 60–70% 70–80% 80–90% >90% Dean: 40–50% 50–60% 60–70% 70–80% 80–90% >90% Tie: 40–50% No data
Governor before election
Bill Haslam
Republican
Elected Governor
Bill Lee
Republican

The 2018 Tennessee gubernatorial election took place on November 6, 2018, to elect the next governor of Tennessee, alongside other state and local elections. Incumbent Republican governor Bill Haslam was term-limited and prohibited by the Constitution of Tennessee from seeking a third consecutive term. Republican candidate Bill Lee was elected with 59.6% of the vote, defeating Democratic nominee and former Nashville mayor Karl Dean in a landslide. Despite Lee’s win, this was the closest win for a Republican since 1994. Lee was sworn in for his first term as Governor on January 19, 2019.

The primary elections took place on August 2, 2018, with Republican Bill Lee and Democrat Karl Dean winning their respective party nominations.

During the general election, Dean flipped back reliably Democratic Davidson, Haywood, and Shelby Counties, which voted for Republican governor Bill Haslam in 2014.

The results of the election marked the first time since 1982 that a candidate from the incumbent president's party was elected governor of Tennessee. This is also the first time that Republicans won three consecutive gubernatorial elections in the state, and the first time that a Republican was elected to succeed another Republican.

As of 2018, this election had the largest number of candidates (28) in a statewide election in United States history; the previous record was the 2016 United States presidential election in Colorado. This large surge in candidates was mostly due to the Libertarian Party of Tennessee's protest of the state's party affiliation and ballot access laws.

== Republican primary ==
=== Candidates ===
==== Nominated ====
- Bill Lee, businessman

==== Eliminated in primary ====
- Diane Black, U.S. representative
- Randy Boyd, former Tennessee cabinet official
- Beth Harwell, speaker of the Tennessee House of Representatives
- Basil Marceaux, perennial candidate
- Kay White, realtor and Democratic nominee for Tennessee's 1st congressional district in 1996 and 1998

==== Withdrawn ====
- Mae Beavers, former state senator (unsuccessfully ran for Wilson County mayor)
- Mark Green, state senator (successfully ran in Tennessee's 7th congressional district)

==== Declined ====
- Marsha Blackburn, U.S. representative (successfully ran for the U.S. Senate)
- Tim Burchett, mayor of Knox County (successfully ran in Tennessee's 2nd congressional district)
- Joe Carr, former state representative, perennial candidate
- Bob Corker, U.S. senator
- Stephen Fincher, former U.S. representative
- Alberto Gonzales, dean of the Belmont University School of Law and former U.S. attorney general
- Bill Hagerty, United States Ambassador to Japan and former Tennessee cabinet official
- Tre Hargett, Tennessee Secretary of State
- Rob Mitchell, Rutherford County property assessor
- Mark Norris, majority leader of the Tennessee Senate, appointed as judge to the United States District Court for the Western District of Tennessee
- Andy Ogles, director of Tennessee chapter of Americans for Prosperity (successfully ran for mayor of Maury County)
- Ron Ramsey, former lieutenant governor of Tennessee and candidate for governor of Tennessee in 2010

=== Endorsements ===
Beth Harwell

Individuals

- Harry Brooks, Tennessee House of Representatives, House Education Administration and Planning Committee chair
- Dale Carr, Tennessee House of Representatives, House Local Government Subcommittee chair
- Mike Carter, Tennessee House of Representatives, House Civil Justice Subcommittee chair
- Jim Coley, Tennessee House of Representatives
- Jeremy Faison, Tennessee House of Representatives, House Government Operations Committee chair
- Andrew Farmer, Tennessee House of Representatives, House Civil Justice Committee chair
- John Forgety, Tennessee House of Representatives, House Education, Instruction and Programs Committee chair
- Patsy Hazlewood, Tennessee House of Representatives
- Gary Hicks, Tennessee House of Representatives
- John Holsclaw Jr., Tennessee House of Representatives, House Business and Utilities Subcommittee chair
- Dan Howell, Tennessee House of Representatives, Joint Judiciary and Government Committee chair, House Local Government Committee vice chair
- Curtis Johnson, Tennessee House of Representatives, House Speaker Pro Tempore
- Pat Marsh, Tennessee House of Representatives, House Business and Utilities Committee chair
- Steve McDaniel, Tennessee House of Representatives, House Rules Committee chair, House Ethics Committee chair, House Finance, Ways, and Means Study Subcommittee chair
- Frank Niceley, Tennessee State Senate, Senate Energy, Agriculture, and Natural Resources 1st vice chair, Senate Transportation and Safety Committee 2nd vice chair
- Tim Rudd, Tennessee House of Representatives
- Charles Sargent, Tennessee House of Representatives, Finance, Ways, and Means Committee chair
- Mike Sparks, Tennessee House of Representatives, House Calendar and Rules Committee vice chair
- Rick Tillis, Tennessee House of Representatives
- Tim Wirgau, Tennessee House of Representatives, House Local Government Committee chair

Organizations

- Tennessee Education Association
- Tennessee Professional Fire Fighters Association
- Tennessee State Employees Association
Diane Black

Individuals

- Mike Pence, 48th vice president of the United States
- Stephen Fincher, former U.S. representative
- Ron Ramsey, former lieutenant governor of Tennessee
- Rick Santorum, former U.S. senator from Pennsylvania
- Steve Scalise, U.S. representative and House Majority Whip (R-LA)
- Jordan Sekulow, radio talk show host and executive director of the American Center for Law and Justice
- Carol M. Swain, former Vanderbilt professor and conservative commentator

Organizations

- American Conservative Union
- Family Research Council
- National Right to Life
- NRA Political Victory Fund
- Students For Trump
- Susan B. Anthony List
Randy Boyd

Individuals

- Jake Bynum, mayor of Weakley County
- Mike Creasy, mayor of Decatur County
- J. Michael Cross, Fentress County executive
- Richard Daniel, Pickett County executive
- Ben Danner, Overton County executive
- Jim Durrett, mayor of Montgomery County
- Brent Greer, mayor of Henry County
- Mike Huckabee, former Arkansas governor and presidential candidate in 2008 and 2016
- Denny Johnson, mayor of Lake County
- Shaun Lawson, mayor of Hickman County
- Joe Boyd Liggett, mayor of Marshall County
- Mark Luttrell, mayor of Shelby County
- Kenny McBride, mayor of Carroll County
- Benny McGuire, mayor of Obion County
- Bill Newman, mayor of Lincoln County
- Denny Robinson, White County executive
- Richard Stewart, mayor of Franklin County
- Sloan Stewart, Lynchburg/Moore County Metro executive
- Skip Taylor, mayor of Fayette County
- Jessie Wallace, Humphreys County executive
- Bill Webb, mayor of Lewis County
- T.R. Williams, Lawrence County executive
- Tom Witherspoon, mayor of Gibson County
- Chris Young, mayor of Dyer County
Bill Lee

U.S. representatives

- Zach Wamp, former U.S. representative (R-TN)

State-level officials

- Mae Beavers, former state senator, former gubernatorial candidate
- Sheila Butt, state representative
- Joe Carr, former state representative
- Andy Holt, state representative
- Jason Zachary, state representative

Individuals

- Steven Curtis Chapman, Christian singer
- Mike Fisher, former center for the Nashville Predators and husband of singer Carrie Underwood
- Scott Hamilton, figure skater and Olympic gold medalist
- Ricky Skaggs, country music singer
- Michael W. Smith, Christian singer
- Darrell Waltrip, motorsports analyst and former NASCAR driver

Newspapers

- Chattanooga Free Press
- Dunlap News
- Johnson City Press

=== Polling ===
Poll source	Date(s) administered	Sample size	Margin of error	Diane Black	Randy Boyd	Beth Harwell	Bill Lee	Other	Undecided
JMC Analytics	July 18–21, 2018	500	± 4.4%	19%	20%	16%	26%	1%	17%
Emerson College	July 11–14, 2018	266	± 6.4%	27%	22%	14%	19%	3%	14%
Data Orbital	June 27–30, 2018	700	± 3.7%	24%	23%	10%	19%	–	24%
Triton Polling & Research (R)	June 25–28, 2018	1,040	± 3.1%	27%	33%	7%	20%	–	13%
OnMessage Inc. (R-Black)	May 14–17, 2018	600	± 4.0%	41%	28%	8%	9%	–	15%
Grassroots Targeting (R-Black)	May 4–6, 2018	800	–	41%	26%	6%	11%	–	15%
OnMessage Inc. (R-Black)	April 2018	–	–	33%	30%	5%	13%	–	–
OnMessage Inc. (R-Black)	March 2018	–	–	31%	31%	10%	10%	–	–
TargetPoint/GQR	March 7–14, 2018	390	± 5.0%	25%	20%	6%	7%	2%	37%
North Star Onion Research (R-Lee)	February 5–11, 2018	600	± 4.0%	22%	25%	4%	18%	–	30%
Triton Polling & Research (R)	December 12–18, 2017	1,028	± 3.1%	22%	12%	6%	4%	4%	53%

=== Results ===
Results by county: Lee: 20–30%; 30–40%; 40–50%; 50–60%; Boyd: 30–40%; 40–50%; 50–60%; Black: 20–30%; 30–40%

Republican primary results
Party	Candidate	Votes	%
Republican	Bill Lee	291,414	36.75
Republican	Randy Boyd	193,054	24.35
Republican	Diane Black	182,457	23.01
Republican	Beth Harwell	121,484	15.32
Republican	Kay White	3,215	0.41
Republican	Basil Marceaux	1,264	0.16
Total votes		792,888	100.0

== Democratic primary ==
=== Candidates ===
==== Nominated ====
- Karl Dean, former mayor of Nashville, 2007–2015

==== Eliminated in primary ====
- Craig Fitzhugh, minority leader of the Tennessee House of Representatives
- Mezianne Vale Payne, retiree

==== Declined ====
- Andy Berke, mayor of Chattanooga and former state senator
- Bill Freeman, businessman and candidate for mayor of Nashville in 2015

=== Endorsements ===
Karl Dean

Federal officials

- Bob Clement, former U.S. representative (D-TN)
- Steve Cohen, U.S. representative (D-TN)
- Jim Cooper, U.S. representative (D-TN)
- Lincoln Davis, former U.S. representative (D-TN)

Labor unions

- Local division of the International Brotherhood of Teamsters
- Memphis AFSCME Local 1733
- Road Sprinkler Fitters U.A. Local Union No. 66
- Tennessee Pipe Trades; Mid-South Carpenters Regional Council

=== Polling ===
Poll source	Date(s) administered	Sample size	Margin of error	Karl Dean	Craig Fitzhugh	Other	Undecided
Emerson College	July 11–14, 2018	206	± 7.3%	44%	14%	9%	33%
TargetPoint/GQR	March 7–14, 2018	288	± 5.8%	41%	11%	–	44%

=== Results ===
Results by county: Dean: 40–50%; 50–60%; 60–70%; 70–80%; 80–90%; 90–100%; Fitzhugh: 40–50%; 50–60%; 70–80%; 80–90%; 90–100%

Democratic primary results
Party	Candidate	Votes	%
Democratic	Karl Dean	280,553	75.14
Democratic	Craig Fitzhugh	72,553	19.43
Democratic	Mezianne Vale Payne	20,284	5.43
Total votes		373,390	100.0

== Independents ==
=== Candidates ===
- Mark CoonRippy Brown (Independent) (Note: Libertarian Party and Green Party do not have ballot access. Appears on ballot as "Independent.")
- Sherry L. Clark (Libertarian)
- Justin Cornett (Libertarian)
- Gabriel Fancher (Libertarian)
- Sean Bruce Fleming (Libertarian)
- William Andrew Helmstetter (Libertarian)
- Cory King (Libertarian)
- Matthew Koch (Libertarian)
- Yvonne Neubert (Green)
- Alfred Shawn Rapoza (Libertarian)
- Chad Riden, comedian (Independent)
- Heather Scott (Libertarian)
- George Blackwell Smith IV (Libertarian)
- Jeremy Allen Stephenson (Libertarian)
- Tracy Yaste Tisdale (Libertarian)
- Mike Toews (Libertarian)
- Rick Tyler, candidate for TN-03 in 2016
- Vinnie Vineyard (Funkmaster V from Wrestling With Ghosts) (Libertarian)
- Jaron D. Weidner (Libertarian)
- Patrick Whitlock (Independent)
- Joe B. Wilmoth (Independent)

== General election ==
=== Debates ===
- Complete video of debate, October 2, 2018
- Complete video of debate, October 12, 2018

=== Endorsements ===
Bill Lee (R)

U.S. executive branch officials

- Mike Pence, 48th vice president of the United States
- Donald Trump, 45th president of the United States

U.S. senators

- Lamar Alexander, U.S. senator (R-TN)

U.S. representatives

- Diane Black, U.S. representative (R-TN) and Republican candidate for governor in 2018
- Marsha Blackburn, U.S. representative (R-TN) and candidate for U.S. Senate in 2018
- Zach Wamp, former U.S. representative (R-TN)

State-level officials

- Mae Beavers, former state senator, former gubernatorial candidate
- Sheila Butt, state representative
- Joe Carr, former State Representative
- Bill Haslam, governor of Tennessee
- Andy Holt, state representative
- Jay Reedy, state representative
- Jason Zachary, state representative

Individuals

- Randy Boyd, businessman and Republican candidate for governor in 2018
- Steven Curtis Chapman, Christian singer
- Mike Fisher, former center for the Nashville Predators and husband of singer Carrie Underwood
- Scott Hamilton, figure skater and Olympic gold medalist
- Ricky Skaggs, country music singer
- Michael W. Smith, Christian singer
- Darrell Waltrip, motorsports analyst and former NASCAR driver

Organizations

- NRA Political Victory Fund
- Tennessee Police Benevolent Association
- Tennessee Professional Fire Fighters Association

Newspapers

- Chattanooga Free Press
- Dunlap News
- Knoxville News Sentinel
Karl Dean (D)

U.S. representatives

- Bob Clement, former U.S. representative (D-TN)
- Steve Cohen, U.S. representative (D-TN)
- Jim Cooper, U.S. representative (D-TN)
- Lincoln Davis, former U.S. representative (D-TN)

State officials

- Terry McAuliffe, 72nd governor of Virginia
- Martin O'Malley, 61st governor of Maryland

Local officials

- Craig Fitzhugh, state representative and former candidate

Labor unions

- Local division of the International Brotherhood of Teamsters
- Memphis AFSCME Local 1733
- Road Sprinkler Fitters U.A. Local Union No. 66
- Tennessee Pipe Trades; Mid-South Carpenters Regional Council

=== Predictions ===
Source	Ranking	As of
The Cook Political Report	Likely R	October 26, 2018
The Washington Post	Likely R	November 5, 2018
FiveThirtyEight	Safe R	November 5, 2018
Rothenberg Political Report	Safe R	November 1, 2018
Sabato's Crystal Ball	Safe R	November 5, 2018
RealClearPolitics	Likely R	November 4, 2018
Daily Kos	Safe R	November 5, 2018
Fox News (Note: The Fox News Midterm Power Rankings uniquely does not contain a category for Safe/Solid races)	Likely R	November 5, 2018
Politico	Likely R	November 5, 2018
Governing	Likely R	November 5, 2018

=== Polling ===
View source data.

Poll source	Date(s) administered	Sample size	Margin of error	Bill Lee (R)	Karl Dean (D)	Other	Undecided
Targoz Market Research	October 28–31, 2018	480	–	53%	44%	–	2%
Emerson College	October 28–30, 2018	621	± 4.0%	54%	41%	2%	3%
Fox News	October 27–30, 2018	718 LV	± 3.5%	54%	37%	2%	7%
Fox News	October 27–30, 2018	850 RV	± 3.0%	52%	36%	2%	9%
Vox Populi Polling	October 27–29, 2018	780	± 3.5%	56%	44%	–	–
CNN/SSRS	October 24–29, 2018	764 LV	± 4.3%	52%	42%	0%	4%
CNN/SSRS	October 24–29, 2018	871 RV	± 4.0%	52%	41%	0%	5%
East Tennessee State University	October 22–29, 2018	495	± 4.4%	48%	36%	5%	9%
Cygnal (R)	October 26–27, 2018	497	± 4.4%	59%	36%	3%	2%
Marist College	October 23–27, 2018	471 LV	± 5.7%	57%	40%	1%	3%
Marist College	October 23–27, 2018	764 RV	± 4.4%	56%	39%	1%	4%
Vanderbilt University/SSRS	October 8–13, 2018	800	± 4.9%	48%	37%	0%	12%
Targoz Market Research	October 9–12, 2018	558 LV	–	56%	44%	–	–
Targoz Market Research	October 9–12, 2018	801 RV	–	49%	39%	–	12%
NYT Upshot/Siena College	October 8–11, 2018	593	± 4.2%	59%	33%	–	8%
Fox News	September 29 – October 2, 2018	666 LV	± 3.5%	53%	36%	1%	10%
Fox News	September 29 – October 2, 2018	806 RV	± 3.5%	52%	35%	1%	10%
SurveyMonkey	September 9–24, 2018	1,609	± 3.3%	46%	35%	–	19%
Vox Populi Polling	September 16–18, 2018	567	± 4.1%	55%	45%	–	–
CNN/SSRS	September 11–15, 2018	723 LV	± 4.3%	52%	43%	0%	3%
CNN/SSRS	September 11–15, 2018	852 RV	± 3.9%	49%	43%	0%	5%
Triton Polling & Research (R)	September 10–12, 2018	1,038	± 3.0%	54%	37%	–	9%
Fox News	September 8–11, 2018	686 LV	± 3.5%	55%	35%	1%	10%
Fox News	September 8–11, 2018	809 RV	± 3.5%	52%	34%	2%	12%
Marist College	August 25–28, 2018	538 LV	± 5.1%	53%	40%	1%	7%
Marist College	August 25–28, 2018	730 RV	± 4.5%	51%	39%	1%	9%
Gravis Marketing	August 9–11, 2018	620	± 3.9%	51%	40%	–	9%
Triton Polling & Research (R)	January 21–24, 2018	1,003	± 3.1%	38%	34%	–	28%

Hypothetical polling

with Karl Dean

Poll source	Date(s) administered	Sample size	Margin of error	Diane Black (R)	Karl Dean (D)	Undecided
Emerson College	July 11–14, 2018	657	± 4.1%	35%	39%	27%
Triton Polling & Research (R)	January 21–24, 2018	1,003	± 3.1%	46%	35%	19%
Gravis Marketing	December 11–12, 2017	563	± 4.1%	40%	31%	28%

Poll source	Date(s) administered	Sample size	Margin of error	Randy Boyd (R)	Karl Dean (D)	Undecided
Emerson College	July 11–14, 2018	657	± 4.1%	34%	36%	30%
Triton Polling & Research (R)	January 21–24, 2018	1,003	± 3.1%	43%	34%	23%
Gravis Marketing	December 11–12, 2017	563	± 4.1%	38%	35%	28%

Poll source	Date(s) administered	Sample size	Margin of error	Beth Harwell (R)	Karl Dean (D)	Undecided
Triton Polling & Research (R)	January 21–24, 2018	1,003	± 3.1%	43%	33%	25%
Gravis Marketing	December 11–12, 2017	563	± 4.1%	38%	33%	29%

with Craig Fitzhugh

Poll source	Date(s) administered	Sample size	Margin of error	Diane Black (R)	Craig Fitzhugh (D)	Undecided
Gravis Marketing	December 11–12, 2017	563	± 4.1%	42%	27%	31%

Poll source	Date(s) administered	Sample size	Margin of error	Randy Boyd (R)	Craig Fitzhugh (D)	Undecided
Gravis Marketing	December 11–12, 2017	563	± 4.1%	39%	30%	31%

Poll source	Date(s) administered	Sample size	Margin of error	Beth Harwell (R)	Craig Fitzhugh (D)	Undecided
Gravis Marketing	December 11–12, 2017	563	± 4.1%	44%	24%	32%

Poll source	Date(s) administered	Sample size	Margin of error	Mae Beavers (R)	Karl Dean (D)	Undecided
Triton Polling & Research (R)	January 21–24, 2018	1,003	± 3.1%	36%	36%	28%
Gravis Marketing	December 11–12, 2017	563	± 4.1%	32%	37%	32%

Poll source	Date(s) administered	Sample size	Margin of error	Mae Beavers (R)	Craig Fitzhugh (D)	Undecided
Gravis Marketing	December 11–12, 2017	563	± 4.1%	36%	29%	34%

=== Results ===

2018 Tennessee gubernatorial election
Party	Candidate	Votes	%	±%
Republican	Bill Lee	1,336,106	59.56%	−10.75%
Democratic	Karl Dean	864,863	38.55%	+15.71%
Other	Other candidates	42,314	1.89%	N/A
Write-in		11	0.00%	0.00%
Total votes		2,243,294	100.00%	N/A
Republican hold				

Full results

Tennessee gubernatorial election, 2018
Party	Candidate	Votes	%
Republican	Bill Lee	1,336,106	59.6
Democratic	Karl Dean	864,863	38.6
Independent	Sherry L. Clark	5,198	0.2
Independent	Mark Wright	4,687	0.2
Independent	Patrick Whitlock	3,631	0.2
Independent	Yvonne Neubert	3,070	0.1
Independent	Heather Scott	2,969	0.1
Independent	Mark CoonRippy Brown	2,841	0.1
Independent	Joe B. Wilmoth	2,444	0.1
Independent	George Blackwell Smith IV	1,550	0.1
Independent	Cory King	1,502	0.1
Independent	Tracy C. Yaste Tisdale	1,396	0.1
Independent	Justin Cornett	1,217	0.1
Independent	Chad Riden	1,096	0.0
Independent	Robert Sawyers Sr.	1,059	0.0
Independent	Vinnie Vineyard	1,012	0.0
Independent	Rick Tyler	981	0.0
Independent	Gabriel Fancher	869	0.0
Independent	Sean Bruce Fleming	814	0.0
Independent	Alfred Shawn Rapoza	800	0.0
Independent	Jessie D. McDonald	755	0.0
Independent	Toney Randall Mitchell	739	0.0
Independent	Mike Toews	726	0.0
Independent	Matthew Koch	652	0.0
Independent	Jeremy Allen Stephenson	613	0.0
Independent	Tommy Ray McAnally	609	0.0
Independent	Jaron D. Weidner	588	0.0
Independent	William Andrew Helmstetter	496	0.0
Independent	Eddie Murphy (write-in)	11	0.0
Total votes		2,243,294	100.0
Republican hold			

=== By county ===
By county

County	Bill Lee Republican		Karl Dean Democratic		Other votes		Total votes
County	%	#	%	#	%	#	Total votes
Anderson	62.46%	16,265	36.34%	9,462	1.20%	313	26,040
Bedford	72.72%	9,489	26.42%	3,447	0.87%	113	13,049
Benton	69.14%	3,696	29.91%	1,599	0.95%	51	5,346
Bledsoe	76.18%	3,102	22.67%	923	1.15%	47	4,072
Blount	70.48%	32,958	28.57%	13,362	0.95%	445	46,765
Bradley	77.37%	26,123	21.58%	7,287	1.05%	355	33,765
Campbell	77.01%	7,820	21.56%	2,189	1.43%	145	10,154
Cannon	74.58%	3,473	24.84%	1,157	0.58%	27	4,657
Carroll	73.41%	6,451	25.57%	2,247	1.02%	90	8,788
Carter	80.15%	14,922	18.93%	3,525	0.91%	170	18,617
Cheatham	68.93%	9,966	30.55%	4,417	0.52%	76	14,459
Chester	77.25%	4,161	20.99%	1,131	1.76%	95	5,387
Claiborne	76.75%	6,514	22.05%	1,871	1.20%	102	8,487
Clay	68.96%	1,773	30.26%	778	0.78%	20	2,571
Cocke	78.55%	8,139	20.07%	2,080	1.38%	143	10,362
Coffee	69.58%	11,828	28.63%	4,867	1.78%	303	16,998
Crockett	73.02%	3,274	26.16%	1,173	0.83%	37	4,484
Cumberland	76.45%	18,217	22.65%	5,396	0.90%	216	23,829
Davidson	32.02%	78,286	62.34%	152,441	5.64%	13,801	244,528
Decatur	73.61%	2,844	24.25%	937	2.15%	83	3,864
DeKalb	70.10%	4,176	29.16%	1,737	0.74%	44	5,957
Dickson	68.31%	11,413	31.14%	5,202	0.54%	91	16,706
Dyer	76.68%	8,515	21.89%	2,431	1.45%	161	11,107
Fayette	69.59%	11,883	28.95%	4,943	1.45%	248	17,074
Fentress	78.96%	5,043	19.64%	1,255	1.41%	91	6,389
Franklin	67.69%	9,432	31.67%	4,413	0.63%	88	13,933
Gibson	70.86%	11,402	27.80%	4,474	1.34%	215	16,091
Giles	70.09%	6,730	28.64%	2,750	1.26%	121	9,601
Grainger	80.08%	5,476	18.79%	1,285	1.13%	77	6,838
Greene	78.74%	16,196	20.27%	4,169	0.99%	205	20,570
Grundy	71.87%	2,699	26.82%	1,007	1.31%	49	3,755
Hamblen	75.87%	13,197	23.36%	4,063	0.77%	133	17,393
Hamilton	55.78%	74,437	43.31%	57,794	0.90%	1,202	133,433
Hancock	80.39%	1,447	18.39%	331	1.22%	22	1,800
Hardeman	54.05%	4,060	44.38%	3,336	1.54%	116	7,512
Hardin	78.17%	6,410	19.55%	1,603	2.28%	187	8,200
Hawkins	80.65%	14,069	18.36%	3,202	0.99%	173	17,444
Haywood	43.03%	2,522	55.78%	3,269	1.19%	70	5,861
Henderson	80.12%	6,922	19.00%	1,642	0.88%	76	8,640
Henry	71.01%	7,698	27.96%	3,031	1.03%	112	10,841
Hickman	70.02%	4,894	28.98%	2,025	1.00%	70	6,989
Houston	63.09%	1,738	35.93%	990	0.98%	27	2,755
Humphreys	64.67%	3,813	34.55%	2,037	0.78%	46	5,896
Jackson	67.41%	2,647	31.63%	1,242	0.97%	38	3,927
Jefferson	76.86%	12,411	22.18%	3,581	0.96%	155	16,147
Johnson	81.62%	4,809	17.19%	1,013	1.19%	70	5,892
Knox	57.68%	96,006	41.12%	68,437	1.20%	2,000	166,443
Lake	65.05%	951	23.05%	337	11.90%	174	1,462
Lauderdale	60.38%	4,026	38.14%	2,543	1.48%	99	6,668
Lawrence	75.91%	9,834	23.53%	3,048	0.56%	72	12,954
Lewis	73.40%	2,969	25.91%	1,048	0.69%	28	4,045
Lincoln	77.33%	8,110	20.07%	2,105	2.60%	273	10,488
Loudon	75.04%	16,245	23.93%	5,181	1.02%	221	21,647
Macon	79.68%	5,078	19.55%	1,246	0.77%	49	6,373
Madison	56.99%	18,722	41.88%	13,759	1.13%	372	32,853
Marion	68.54%	6,327	30.40%	2,806	1.06%	98	9,231
Marshall	70.52%	7,074	28.82%	2,891	0.66%	66	10,031
Maury	65.07%	21,297	34.10%	11,149	0.87%	284	32,730
McMinn	77.53%	12,268	21.37%	3,382	1.10%	174	15,824
McNairy	75.87%	6,201	22.33%	1,825	1.81%	148	8,174
Meigs	76.72%	2,920	22.23%	846	1.05%	40	3,806
Monroe	76.90%	11,146	22.12%	3,206	0.99%	143	14,495
Montgomery	53.98%	27,920	43.82%	22,664	2.20%	1,140	51,724
Moore	77.57%	1,944	20.91%	524	1.52%	38	2,506
Morgan	76.89%	4,331	22.07%	1,243	1.05%	59	5,633
Obion	77.52%	7,425	21.36%	2,053	1.04%	100	9,578
Overton	68.53%	4,951	30.64%	2,213	0.83%	60	7,224
Perry	72.37%	1,771	26.73%	654	0.90%	22	2,447
Pickett	73.95%	1,689	25.66%	586	0.39%	9	2,284
Polk	74.73%	4,359	24.38%	1,422	0.89%	52	5,833
Putnam	67.33%	16,407	31.64%	7,710	1.03%	252	24,369
Rhea	78.58%	7,382	20.50%	1,926	0.92%	86	9,394
Roane	71.91%	13,868	27.00%	5,207	1.08%	209	19,284
Robertson	69.61%	16,816	29.71%	7,177	0.68%	165	24,158
Rutherford	57.55%	56,957	41.53%	41,108	0.92%	908	98,973
Scott	81.54%	4,472	17.52%	961	0.95%	52	5,485
Sequatchie	75.24%	3,766	23.68%	1,185	1.08%	54	5,005
Sevier	76.80%	23,059	21.44%	6,442	1.84%	553	30,054
Shelby	36.74%	106,594	60.50%	175,478	2.78%	8,076	290,148
Smith	72.38%	4,745	26.79%	1,756	0.84%	55	6,556
Stewart	69.24%	3,102	29.67%	1,329	1.09%	49	4,480
Sullivan	76.42%	41,548	22.76%	12,373	0.83%	449	54,370
Sumner	67.33%	44,149	31.93%	20,914	0.78%	513	65,576
Tipton	72.86%	14,074	25.40%	4,908	1.74%	336	19,318
Trousdale	65.60%	1,739	33.20%	881	1.17%	31	2,651
Unicoi	79.57%	5,008	19.51%	1,228	0.92%	58	6,294
Union	77.11%	4,028	21.69%	1,133	1.21%	63	5,224
Van Buren	70.27%	1,555	28.20%	624	1.54%	34	2,213
Warren	67.44%	7,737	31.75%	3,643	0.80%	92	11,472
Washington	69.00%	31,066	30.16%	13,584	0.86%	386	45,036
Wayne	81.93%	3,876	17.31%	818	0.78%	37	4,731
Weakley	72.82%	7,203	25.85%	2,557	1.33%	132	9,892
White	75.50%	6,374	23.74%	2,005	0.77%	65	8,444
Williamson	64.54%	68,189	32.83%	34,647	2.67%	2,818	105,654
Wilson	66.88%	35,488	32.01%	16,987	1.12%	592	'53,067

==== Counties that flipped from Republican to Democratic ====
- Davidson (largest city: Nashville)
- Haywood (largest city: Brownsville)
- Shelby (largest city: Memphis)

State Senate district results

State House district results

==== By congressional district ====
Lee won seven of nine congressional districts.

District	Lee	Dean	Representative
1st	76.2%	22.7%	Phil Roe
2nd	63.5%	35.4%	Jimmy Duncan (115th Congress)
2nd	63.5%	35.4%	Tim Burchett (116th Congress)
3rd	64.0%	35.0%	Chuck Fleischmann
4th	66.0%	33.0%	Scott DesJarlais
5th	35.6%	59.3%	Jim Cooper
6th	69.7%	29.3%	Diane Black (115th Congress)
6th	69.7%	29.3%	John Rose (116th Congress)
7th	65.4%	32.6%	Marsha Blackburn (115th Congress)
7th	65.4%	32.6%	Mark Green (116th Congress)
8th	66.5%	32.2%	David Kustoff
9th	21.5%	74.9%	Steve Cohen

== See also ==
- 2018 United States Senate election in Tennessee
- 2018 Tennessee elections
