= Mark Pody =

American politician (born 1956)

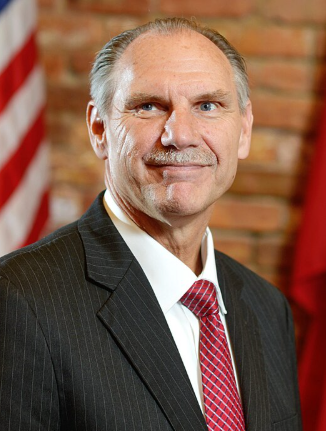
- Pody in 2017

Member of the Tennessee Senate from the 17th district
- Incumbent
- Assumed office January 9, 2018
- Preceded by: Mae Beavers

Member of the Tennessee House of Representatives from the 46th district
- In office January 11, 2011 – January 9, 2018
- Preceded by: Stratton Bone, Jr.
- Succeeded by: Clark Boyd

Personal details
- Born: April 23, 1956 (age 70) Spokane, Washington
- Party: Republican
- Spouse: Barbara Lynne Pody
- Occupation: Politician; Insurance Producer
- Website: http://markpody.com/bio/

Mark Allen Pody (born April 23, 1956) is an American politician, elected as a Republican member of the Tennessee Senate from the 17th district, encompassing eastern parts of Davidson County and Wilson County. Pody resides in Lebanon, Tennessee.

== Early life ==
Mark Allen Pody was born on April 23, 1956, in Spokane, Washington.

== Non-Political Career ==
Pody owns Educators Resource Association, Inc. of Murfreesboro Tennessee. Pody's small business sells insurance policies providing accident and health insurance, group insurance, health insurance, insurance agents and brokers, and life insurance coverage, notably for Nationwide, Progressive. and BlueCross BlueShield of Tennessee.

Pody is a member of the Tennessee Firearms Association, the Chambers of Commerce in Lebanon, the Trousdale County, Watertown, and Cannon County. He is also a past President of the General Agents & Managers Association. A private pilot, Pody is a member of the Civil Air Patrol.

== Political career ==
=== Elections ===
After running unopposed in the Republican primary, Pody won election to the Tennessee General Assembly in November 2010 by defeating the incumbent representative, Democrat Stratton Bone Jr., 9,270 to 8,181.

In 2012, Pody ran unopposed in both the Republican primary and general election to win a second House term.

In 2014, Pody ran unopposed in the Republican primary. He defeated Democrat Candace Reed, 9,896 to 4,777.

In 2016, Pody ran unopposed in the Republican primary. He defeated Democrat Amelia Morrison Hipps, 19,785 to 6,589.

In September 2017, Tennessee state senator Mae Beavers resigned her seat to run for governor. This resignation required a special election to fill the seat for the remaining year of her term. Pody ran unopposed in the Republican primary, and he defeated Democrat Mary Alice Carfi in the special election, 5,995 to 5,688.

In the regular senate election the following year, Pody again defeated Carfi, 53,364 to 22,452.

=== Presidential Endorsements ===
In 2012, Pody endorsed Rick Santorum as the Republican presidential nominee.

=== Political Issues ===
==== Abortion ====
In 2026, he sponsored an amendment to introduce the death penalty for women who had abortions.

==== Religious Freedom ====
In April 2012, Pody proposed legislation in favor of religious freedom on state college campuses in reaction to Vanderbilt University's "all-comers" policy, which required groups on college campuses to accept students regardless of their religion or sexual identity.

==== Obamacare ====
Pody co-sponsored a bill to nullify the implementation of the Patient Protection and Affordable Care Act (commonly known as Obamacare). The bill failed.

==== LGBT ====
In September 2015, Pody proposed bill HB1412, known as the Tennessee Natural Marriage Defense Act, to ban same-sex marriage in Tennessee despite the Supreme Court's decision to legalize it. He drew a parallel with the Fugitive Slave Act of 1850. His colleague in the Senate, Mae Beavers, proposed a similar bill. According to the Nashville Scene, Pody "believes he’s on a mission from God to stamp out same-sex marriage." The bill failed to move out of committee.

In 2017, Pody filed a bill that would have restricted students to using a bathroom for the gender they were assigned at birth. The bill, which was seen as anti-transgender, failed.

In 2021, Pody supported a bill, which passed the legislature, that would allow guardians to keep their children from being exposed to school lessons on the LGBTQ community. He also voted for a bill, which became state law, that "a student's gender for purposes of participation in a public middle school or high school interscholastic athletic activity or event be determined by the student's sex at the time of the student's birth, as indicated on the student's original birth certificate." In 2023, he sponsored Tennessee House Bill 878, which would allow individuals the right to refuse marriage solemnization due to religious objections.

==== 2020 Presidential Election ====
In November 2020, Pody supported the "Stop the Steal" movement that endorsed Donald Trump's contesting of the 2020 election results. He also signed on to a January 2021 letter sent from Republican state legislators asking Tennessee's U.S. senators to object to Joe Biden's electoral victory. Pody paid for several Tennesseans to attend the January 6, 2021 protest of Biden's victory, but he denounced the violence that took place at the U.S. Capitol.

==== COVID-19 ====
In July 2021, Pody declined to sign a letter by Republican state senators that urged Tennesseans to get vaccinated against COVID-19. In October, 2021, he spoke against vaccine mandates at a conference focused on opposition to COVID-19 mitigation actions such as mandatory vaccines, masking, and social distancing.

== Personal life ==
Pody is married to Barbara Lynne Pody and has two children. He self-identifies as a Christian and attends Woodmont Bible Church in Nashville.
