= Bill Lee (Tennessee politician) =

Governor of Tennessee since 2019

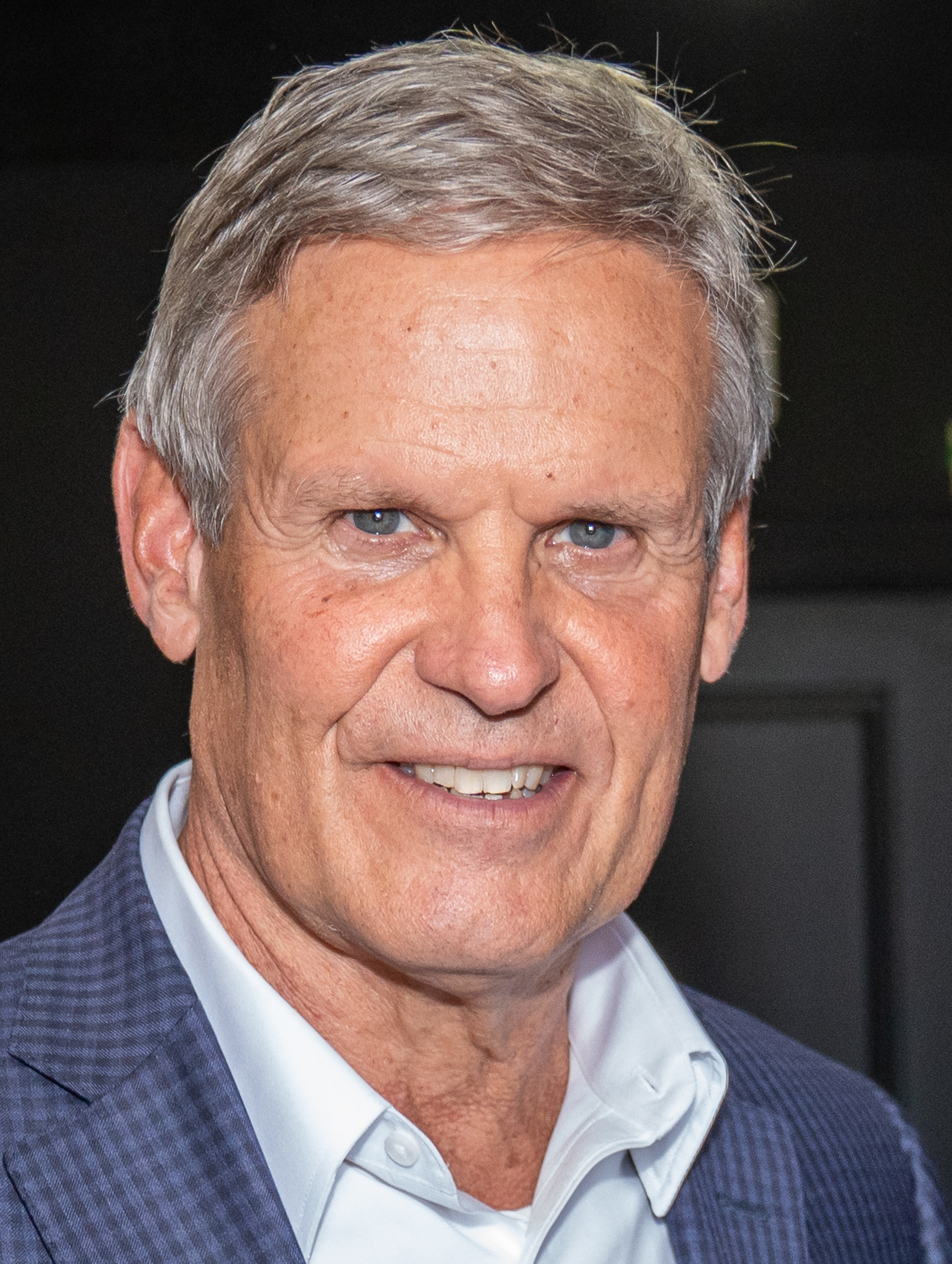
- Lee in 2025

50th Governor of Tennessee
- Incumbent
- Assumed office January 19, 2019
- Lieutenant: Randy McNally
- Preceded by: Bill Haslam

Chair of the Republican Governors Association
- In office December 7, 2023 – November 20, 2024
- Preceded by: Kim Reynolds
- Succeeded by: Brian Kemp

Personal details
- Born: William Byron Lee; October 9, 1959 (age 67) Franklin, Tennessee, U.S.
- Party: Republican
- Spouses: Carol Ann Lee (m. 1984; died 2000) Maria Lee (m. 2008)
- Children: 4
- Education: Auburn University (BS)
- Website: Office website
- Bill Lee's voice Bill Lee on protecting seniors amid the COVID-19 pandemic. Recorded April 30, 2020

William Byron Lee (born October 9, 1959) is an American businessman and politician who has served since 2019 as the 50th governor of Tennessee. A member of the Republican Party, Lee was president and chief executive officer (CEO) of the Lee Company, a business operated by his family, from 1992 to 2016.

In 2017, Lee described himself as a social conservative. As governor, he has signed bills to ban mask mandates and ranked-choice voting; implemented one of the country's strictest abortion bans; allowed guns to be carried without a permit; created school voucher programs; and increased penalties for protest-related offenses. Lee signed Tennessee's "bathroom bill"; a bill that assures continued taxpayer funding of faith-based adoption agencies that exclude LGBT people for religious reasons; and the Adult Entertainment Act, which banned drag shows in public.

== Early life and career ==
William Byron Lee was born on October 9, 1959. He was raised on his family's 1,000-acre (400 ha) cattle farm started by his grandparents in Franklin, Tennessee, the Triple L Ranch; the family raises Hereford cattle. Lee is a seventh-generation Tennessean.

After graduating from Franklin High School in his hometown, Lee entered Auburn University in 1977 and graduated in 1981 with a bachelor's degree in mechanical engineering. In college, Lee was a member of the Kappa Alpha Order, a fraternity known at the time for its use of Confederate imagery, and a photo printed in the university's 1980 yearbook shows Lee in a Confederate military uniform at the fraternity's "Old South" party. In 2019, after his attendance came to light, Lee expressed regret for his participation: "I never intentionally acted in an insensitive way, but with the benefit of hindsight, I can see that participating in that was insensitive and I've come to regret it."

Lee was named president and CEO of his family's home services and construction company, Lee Company, holding the position from 1992 until 2016. He briefly served as chairman.

== Governor of Tennessee (2019-present) ==
=== Elections ===
==== 2018 ====
Final results by county in 2018: Bill Lee: 80–90%; 70–80%; 60–70%; 50–60%; Karl Dean: 60–70%; 50–60%

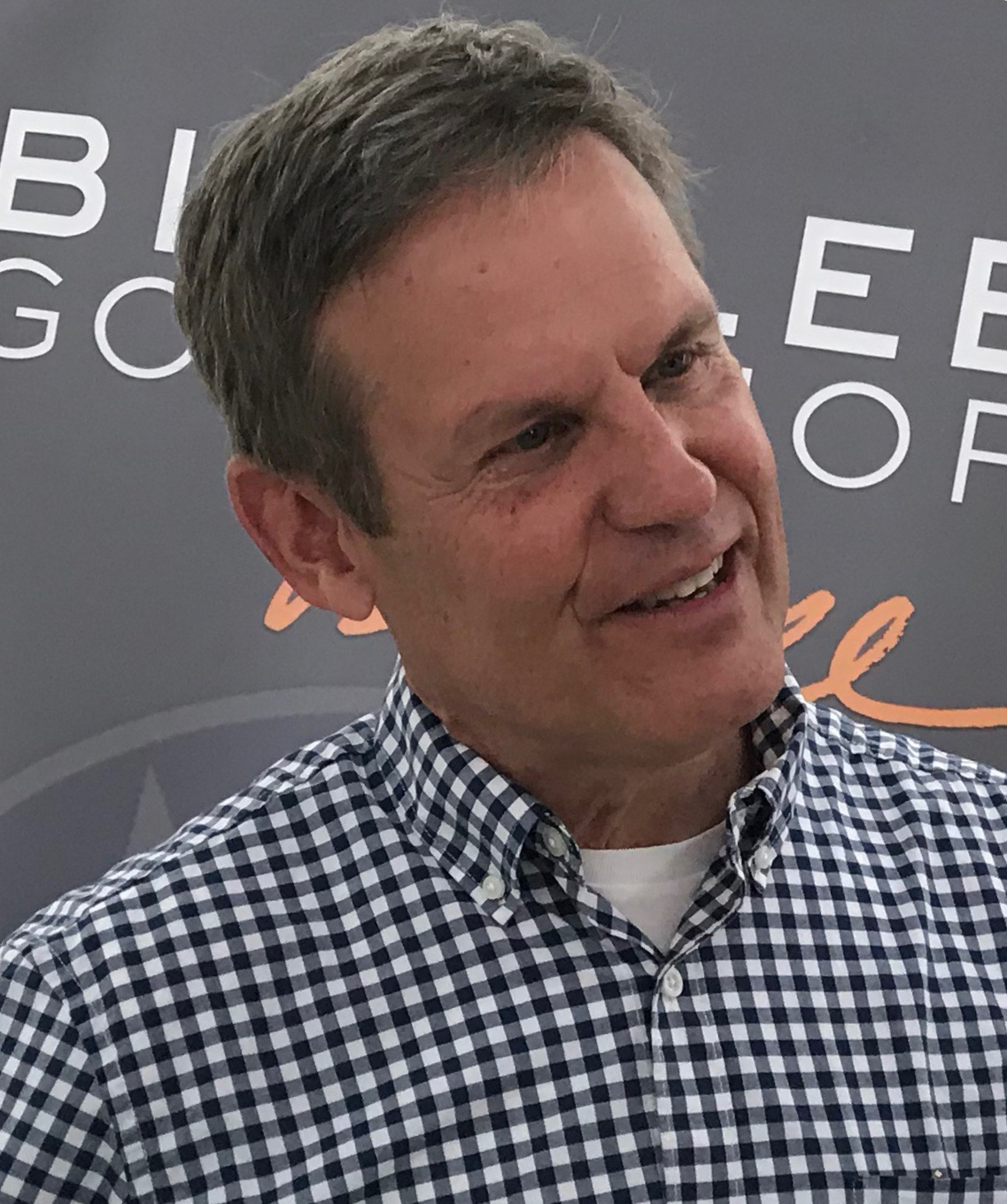
Bill Lee at his campaign event in 2018

In April 2017, Lee announced his candidacy in the 2018 election for governor of Tennessee. A self-described social conservative, he also targeted pro-business Republicans. In the Republican primary election, Lee faced Congresswoman Diane Black, Knoxville businessman and former Tennessee Economic and Development Commissioner Randy Boyd, and state House speaker Beth Harwell. Originally considered a long shot, Lee rose in the polls as Boyd and Black launched negative advertising against each other. He won the August 2 primary with 291,414 votes (36.8%) to Boyd's 193,054 (24.3%), Black's 182,457 (23.0%), and Harwell's 121,484 (15.3%).

Lee defeated former Democratic Nashville mayor Karl Dean in the November 6 general election, receiving 1,336,106 votes (59.6%) to Dean's 864,863 (38.6%). This marked the first time since 1982 that a candidate from the incumbent U.S. President's party was elected governor of Tennessee. This is also the first time that Republicans won three consecutive gubernatorial elections in the state, and the first time that a Republican was elected to succeed another Republican.

As of 2026, this election had the largest number of candidates (28) in a statewide election in U.S. history; the previous record was the 2016 United States presidential election in Colorado. This large surge in candidates was mostly due to the Libertarian Party of Tennessee's protest of the state's party affiliation and ballot access laws.

==== 2022 ====
Final results by county in 2022: Bill Lee: 80–90%; 70–80%; 60–70%; 50–60%; Jason Martin: 60–70%; 50–60%

In September 2020, Lee announced his candidacy for reelection for 2022. He was unchallenged in the Republican primary and endorsed in August 2021 by Donald Trump.

In the November 8 general election, Lee was reelected, receiving 1,129,390 votes (64.9%) to Democratic nominee Jason Martin's 572,818 (32.9%).

During the general election, Lee flipped reliably Democratic Haywood County, home to Brownsville. It is one of only two remaining counties in Tennessee, along with Shelby County, with a majority African-American population. Haywood County has not voted Republican on a presidential level since 1972.

Voter turnout for the 2022 midterm elections in Tennessee was the lowest it has been in nearly a decade, with only 38.57% of Tennessee's registered voters turning out. The last time turnout was this low in Tennessee was in the 2014 midterm elections. This turnout was far below the 2020 presidential election in Tennessee, which saw a turnout of 68.6%.

Lee was sworn in on January 21, 2023.

=== Tenure ===
==== First term ====
Lee was inaugurated as governor January 19, 2019, and delivered his first State of the State address to the Tennessee General Assembly in March 2019.

In May 2019, he signed into law a school voucher bill that created a program to provide public funds to families for private school tuition and costs, starting in the 2020–21 fiscal year, but a judge ruled the program unconstitutional in May 2020, before it could go into effect. Of $64 million in discretionary COVID-19 relief funding for education that went to his office, Lee sent $10 million to charter schools, including $4.4 million to launch new charters.

In July 2019, Lee signed a bill into law that requires school districts to establish threat assessment teams to address potential threats to school safety.

Lee declared October 10, 2019, a voluntary day of prayer and fasting.

In January 2020, Lee proposed a bill to ban abortion as early as six weeks into pregnancy.

In February 2020, Lee signed a bill making Tennessee's official nickname the "Volunteer State". The name originated during the War of 1812, when Tennessee sent 1,500 volunteer soldiers. In February, Lee also proposed a $117 million investment to increase teacher salaries and a $250 million endowment to address mental health in K-12 education. In 2021, Lee appointed John DeBerry as his senior advisor. DeBerry was a Democratic member of the state house whom the Tennessee Democratic Party removed from the 2020 primary ballot.

==== Second term ====
In March 2024, Lee signed the ELVIS Act, which is designed to protect musicians from unauthorized use of their voices by artificial intelligence technologies and against audio deepfakes and voice cloning. It was noted to be the first such enacted legislation in the nation.

In 2022, Lee signed a bill into law that prohibits localities in Tennessee from using ranked-choice voting.

In 2025, Lee proposed the Education Freedom Scholarship Act, which provides roughly 20,000 scholarships worth $7,500 to be used for private school tuition, at a total cost of $447 million. The general assembly narrowly passed the program, despite opposition from Democrats and Republicans from predominantly rural districts, and it went into effect in the 2025-26 school year. In 2026, Lee and the legislature expanded the program to include 35,000 students.

=== Disaster and emergency response ===
==== COVID-19 pandemic ====
On March 12, 2020, in response to the growing number of COVID-19 cases, Lee issued an executive order declaring a temporary state of emergency in Tennessee to "facilitate the treatment and containment of COVID-19." He extended the "stay-at-home" mandate through April 2020. Lee issued further orders for a "limited continuing state of emergency" through 2020 and 2021 to facilitate the state's eligibility for federal economic aid, and allowed the Tennessee National Guard and Tennessee State Guard to continue to assist with COVID-19 response efforts.

In March 2020, as the number of COVID-19 cases grew, Lee urged school districts to close through March to prevent the further spread of the disease. In April, as the number of COVID-19 cases continued to grow, he asked all school districts to close for the remainder of the school year. In October 2020, after a member of Lee's security detail tested positive for COVID-19, Lee said that he and his wife would quarantine at home, likely for two weeks.

Throughout the pandemic, Lee opposed a statewide mask mandate and "touted Tennessee for being one of the last to close early in the pandemic and among the first to reopen." On April 28, 2020, Lee signed an executive order allowing gyms in 89 out of 95 counties to open on May 1. By September, he lifted restrictions on businesses and gathering restrictions in Tennessee, except for the state's six most populous counties. By April 2021, Lee declared that COVID-19 was "a managed public health issue in Tennessee and no longer a statewide public health emergency"; ended local authority on mask mandates in 89 counties; and called for remaining local restrictions to be lifted.

As the highly contagious Delta variant spread in Tennessee, Lee said that he had "no real concern" about it. COVID-19 cases and hospitalizations surged in Tennessee from July to August 2021. Tennessee's COVID-19 vaccination rate was among the lowest in the country. Lee encouraged Tennesseans to get vaccinated, but opposed vaccine mandates and, amid the resurgence of COVID-19 cases, maintained that it was a personal choice whether to get vaccinated. He also dismissed suggestions to return to restrictions or offer COVID-19 vaccine incentives.

In 2021, Lee blocked the Tennessee Department of Health from reaching out to teenagers to encourage them to get vaccinated. In July 2021, his administration fired the state's vaccine chief, Michelle Fiscus, who had angered some Republican state legislators by promoting vaccination for eligible youth. The state Health Department stopped vaccination-related outreach to minors for all diseases, not only COVID-19. Lee opposed offering vaccine incentives even as the Tennessee government spent nearly $500,000 to incentivize farmers to vaccinate cattle against respiratory disease as part of the "Herd Health" program, launched in 2019 under Lee.

In August 2021, Lee signed an executive order that allowed parents to let their children opt out of school mask mandates. The next month, Lee vowed to fight President Joe Biden's plan to require COVID-19 vaccines for federal employees and federal contractors, as well as to require businesses with more than 100 employees to require vaccination or weekly COVID-19 testing; Lee asserted that the action was unconstitutional.

In November 2021, Lee signed a bill into law that restricted the ability of localities to implement public health restrictions, such as mask mandates.

==== 2019 west Tennessee flooding ====
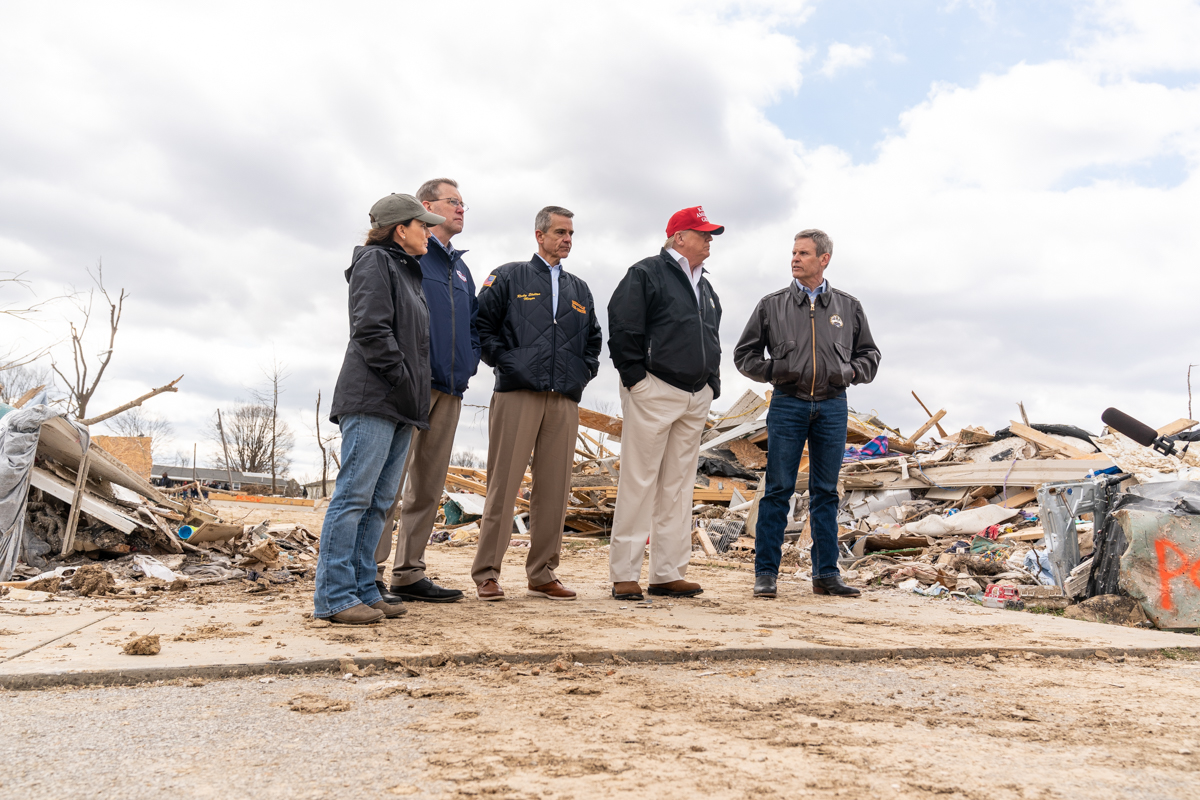
Governor Lee (far right) tours a tornado ravaged neighborhood in Cookeville with President Donald Trump in 2020.

In July 2019, Lee toured damage in West Tennessee inflicted by flooding from the remnants of Hurricane Barry. A series of tornadoes in Tennessee on March 2–3, 2020, killed 25 people and injured 150. Lee oversaw the state recovery efforts and surveyed the damage in Nashville, visiting Germantown, Tennessee State University, and Cookeville.

==== Hurricane Helene ====
In September 2024, Lee declined to declare a state of emergency as Hurricane Helene approached the state from the Gulf of Mexico with torrential rain, flash floods, high winds, and tornadoes. Instead, while catastrophic flooding was occurring in his state, he proclaimed September 27 a "voluntary day of prayer and fasting". Eventually Lee was persuaded to ask for a declaration and the federal assistance that would ensue. Once he requested a declaration of a state of emergency, President Biden immediately granted it.

== Political positions ==
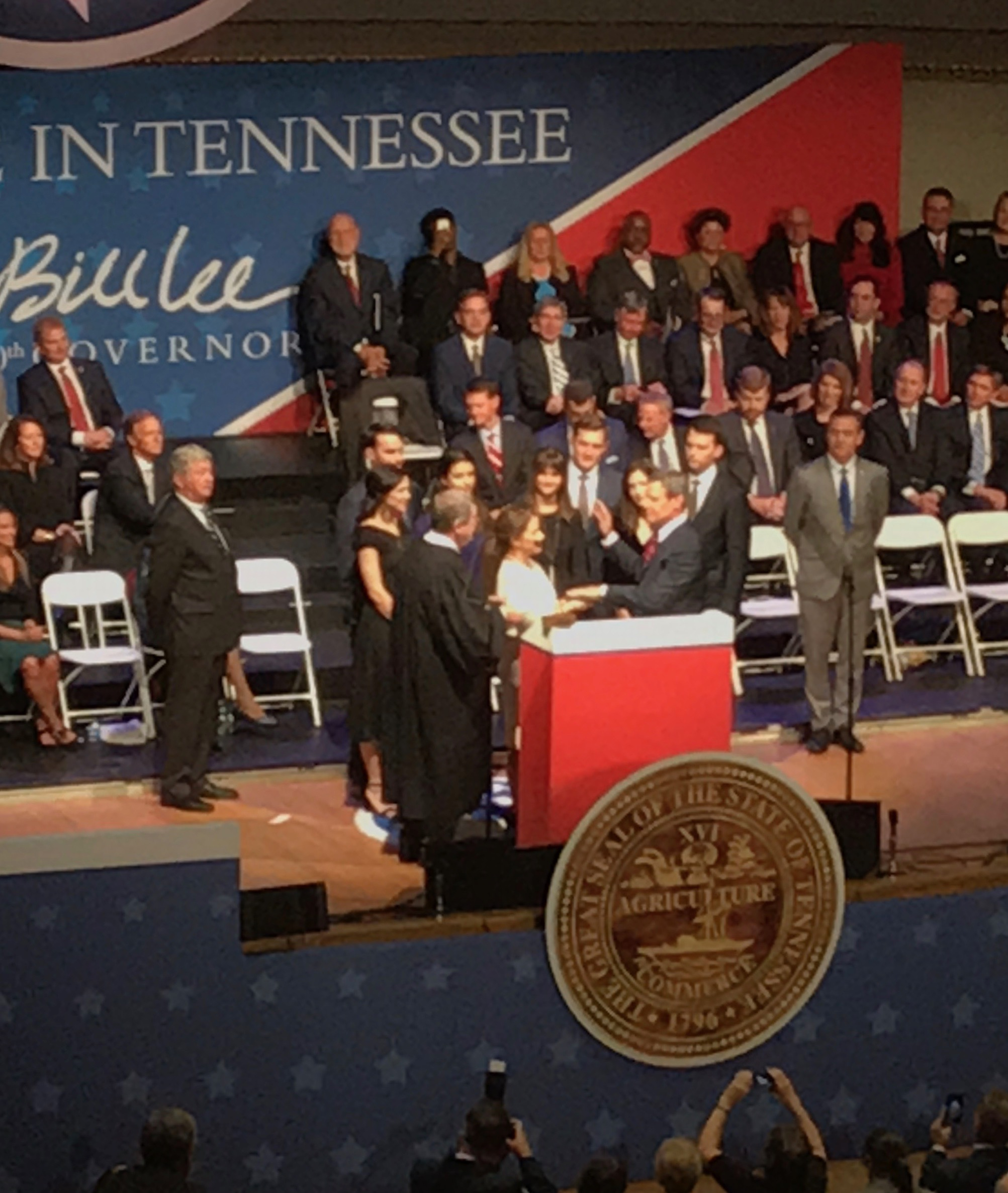
Governor Bill Lee taking the oath of office in 2019

=== 2020 presidential election ===
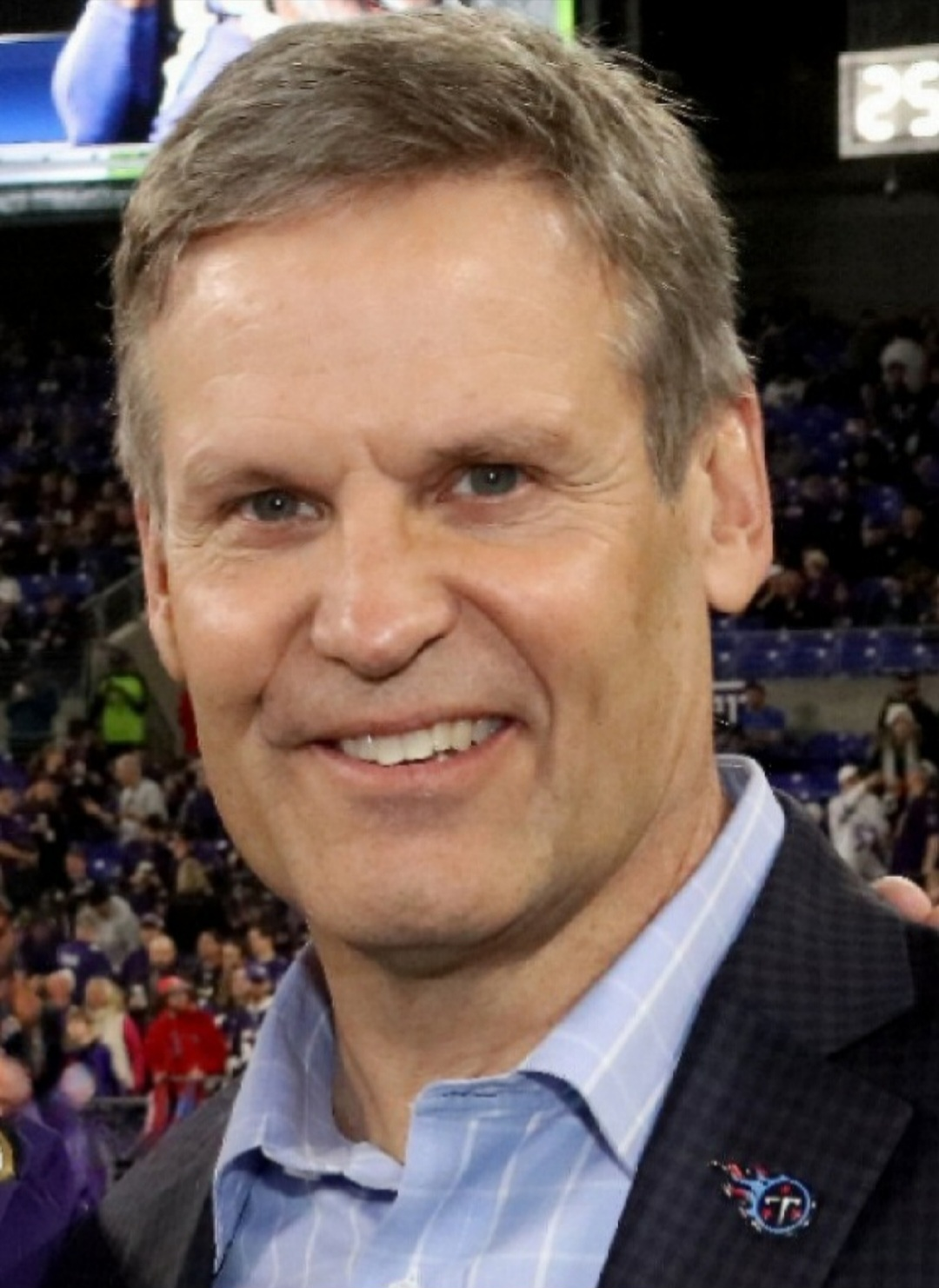
Lee in 2020

After Supreme Court Justice Ruth Bader Ginsburg died on September 18, 2020, several weeks before the presidential election, Lee supported Trump's nomination of Amy Coney Barrett to fill the vacant seat, citing her position on abortion. After Joe Biden defeated Trump in the 2020 presidential election, Lee was one of many Republican officials nationwide who refused to acknowledge Biden's victory amid Trump's false claims of fraud. Biden won a clear victory in both the popular and the electoral vote, but Lee refused to recognize Biden as president-elect even after the election had been called, after the presidential transition had formally begun, and after the electoral college had voted, formalizing Biden's victory. On January 8, 2021, two days after a pro-Trump mob stormed the U.S. Capitol in a bid to disrupt the counting of the electoral votes and keep Trump in power, Lee condemned the riot and acknowledged Biden as president-elect.

=== Abortion ===
In January 2020, Lee proposed a bill to ban abortion as early as six weeks into pregnancy. The legislation was among the nation's strictest abortion bans, and was similar to six-week abortion bans that were blocked by courts in Mississippi, Ohio, and other states. Passed in the final hours of the General Assembly 2020 session on a party-line vote, it was challenged in federal court by Planned Parenthood and the ACLU. Lee signed the bill into law in July 2020. A federal judge immediately blocked its enforcement because it violated Supreme Court precedent, such as Roe v. Wade, which prohibits undue burdens on pre-viability abortions.

After Roe v. Wade was overturned, Lee supported Tennessee's near-total ban on abortion, which has no exceptions for rape, incest, or the mother's health. Lee has said the ban provides "maximum protection possible for both mother and child", but it makes no explicit exceptions for the pregnant patient's health. It makes an exception for an "affirmative defense" for emergencies, but the vagueness of that language makes physicians hesitant to perform abortions even when the mother's life is in jeopardy.

=== Budget and economy ===
In 2019, Lee proposed repealing Tennessee's 10% amusement tax on gym, fitness center, and health club fees, arguing that the tax discourages Tennesseans from being physically active. If enacted, the repeal would reduce state revenues by about $10 million.

In September 2020, Lee supported a Tennessee delegation that traveled to Beijing to enhance trade and economic linkages between the state and the People's Republic of China.

=== Cannabis ===
As a candidate for governor, Lee opposed medical marijuana legislation and marijuana decriminalization. As governor, he continued to oppose marijuana decriminalization, saying in 2019 it was "not good for our state."

=== Capital punishment ===
Lee supports capital punishment, and Tennessee has executed seven people since he took office, making Tennessee among the 27 U.S. states where capital punishment is legal. One notable person executed under Lee was Nicholas Todd Sutton. He was sentenced to life after taking three lives, including that of his grandmother, from 1979 to 1980. While in prison, he saved one corrections officer's life, protected two others, and converted to Christianity. In 1986, while Sutton was a drug dealer in prison, an addicted inmate serving time for pedophilia threatened to stab Sutton for more drugs; Sutton and three other inmates later went to the pedophile's cell and stabbed him 38 times, killing him. The slain pedophile's victims called his murder the best day of their lives and petitioned for clemency for Sutton. In February 2020, Sutton was executed for the murder of his fellow inmate rather than his first three victims, after Lee denied him clemency.

In 2022, Lee set a temporary moratorium on Tennessee's death penalty, citing concerns about botched executions. In 2024, he signed into law a bill that would impose the death penalty on people convicted of child rape, but the law is unenforceable due to Kennedy v. Louisiana.

On May 21, 2026, convicted murderer Tony Carruthers was set to be executed for the 1994 kidnapping and murders of Marcellos Anderson, Delois Anderson, and Frederick Tucker. A group of healthcare workers spent about an hour trying to establish an IV through which to administer a lethal sedative. After they tried Carruthers's arms, feet, collarbone, and shoulder, Lee called the warden and halted the execution, giving Carruthers a one-year reprieve.

Leading up to August 2026, calls for another moratorium on Tennessee's capital punishment were renewed when inmate Darrell Hines was set to be executed. Lee opposed the measure, saying, "we live in a broken world where people commit horrible and heinous crimes, and victims and their families are devastated, and it's a very difficult—those are very difficult situations...The people have chosen the death penalty for those most heinous crimes. It's my responsibility to make sure that law is carried out".

On September 30, 2026, convicted murderer Christa Pike was set to be executed. After she was administered two lethal doses of sedative and survived, Lee postponed all executions scheduled for the rest of the year, citing a need for third-party review of what occurred: "the people of Tennessee expect it to be done in a manner that is not only legal and constitutional but is effective". Pike was alive and breathing for nearly an hour before being taken to a hospital. Of the four planned executions carried out in 2026, only one was performed without incident.

=== Education ===
Lee strongly supports school vouchers and charter schools. In a March 2019 "State of West Tennessee" address, he proposed creating more charter schools and that the state use $25 million to help traditional public schools when they lose students. In his February 2020 "state of West Tennessee" address, he proposed investing $70 million to equip teachers with professional development, materials, and other tools to help increase the state's literacy rate. Lee has also promoted the GIVE program, which prioritizes learning opportunities in rural counties and enhances career and technical education statewide.

In April 2019, Lee announced that Tennessee would temporarily reinstate paper-based assessments for students taking the TNReady test, an annual statewide assessment, during the 2019–20 school year.

In May 2019, he signed into law a school voucher bill that created a program to provide public funds to families for private school tuition and costs, starting in the 2020–21 fiscal year, but a judge ruled the program unconstitutional in May 2020, before it could go into effect. Of $64 million in discretionary COVID-19 relief funding for education that went to his office, Lee sent $10 million to charter schools, including $4.4 million to launch new charters. In July 2019, Lee signed a bill into law that requires school districts to establish threat assessment teams to address potential threats to school safety. In February 2020, Lee proposed a $117 million investment to increase teacher salaries and a $250 million endowment to address mental health in K-12 education.

In 2025, Lee proposed the Education Freedom Scholarship Act, which provides roughly 20,000 scholarships worth $7,500 to be used for private school tuition, at a total cost of $447 million. The program was narrowly passed by the general assembly, despite opposition from Democrats and Republicans from predominantly rural districts, and went into effect in the 2025-26 school year. An expansion of the program to include 35,000 students was pushed by Lee in 2026 and narrowly passed by the legislature.

=== Race relations and George Floyd protests ===
In July 2019, Lee signed an order proclaiming Nathan Bedford Forrest Day, as required by Tennessee law, celebrating Forrest, a famous Confederate general and the first Grand Wizard of the white supremacist group the Ku Klux Klan. The legislature repealed this requirement in June 2020. In December 2019, Lee proclaimed December 1 Rosa Parks Day, to commemorate the start of the 1955 Montgomery bus boycott. In May 2020, after Minneapolis police murdered George Floyd, Lee condemned the officers involved, saying, "police brutality is not law enforcement". On May 30, 2020, an "I will breathe" protest was held in Nashville in protest of Floyd's murder, during which a man set fire to the Davidson County Courthouse; the building was not severely damaged. In response, Lee mobilized the National Guard in Nashville, saying the protests had taken "a violent, unlawful turn".

In August 2020, Lee signed into law a bill increasing the severity of penalties for a number of protest-related offenses. Notably, it reclassifies camping on state property, after being warned of trespass, from a misdemeanor to a felony offense punishable by up to 6 years in prison. This means that anyone convicted of the act will also lose their right to vote, as convicted felons in Tennessee are disfranchised. In 2024, Lee signed a law allowing public officials to refuse to perform marriages that they oppose for "reasons of conscience or other religious beliefs", including refusing to perform interracial or interfaith marriages. The law allows for "the possibility for couples to be refused marriage for a whole host of reasons, including their race, religion or national origin".

=== Refugee resettlement ===
In December 2019, after President Trump allowed states to halt refugee resettlement in their states, Lee declined the offer and announced that Tennessee would continue to accept refugees. Lee's decision was opposed by Lieutenant Governor Randy McNally and Speaker of the Tennessee House of Representatives Cameron Sexton. During a 2020 trip to the Tri-Cities, Lee was met with protests from opponents of refugee resettlement.

=== Gambling ===
Lee opposes legalized gambling, but in 2019, he allowed a sports betting legalization bill to become law without his signature.

=== Guns ===
In 2019, with the support of Republican state legislators, Lee loosened Tennessee's handgun law, allowing "concealed-carry-only" handgun permits to be obtained without requiring applicants to show an ability to fire a weapon. In April 2021, Lee signed into law a permitless carry bill; the legislation allows most adults 21 and older (as well as military personnel ages 18–20) to carry handguns (open and concealed) without a background check or required training. It also increased the penalty for unlawful use of a firearm and obtaining an illegal firearm. The bill, which Lee also supported the previous year, was supported by the National Rifle Association of America and opposed by law enforcement organizations, such as police chiefs, sheriffs and prosecutors. After the Covenant School shooting in Nashville on March 27, 2023, Lee did not initially call for any gun control, saying: "There will come a time to discuss and debate policy. But this is not a time for hate or rage. That will not resolve or heal." Lee said that his wife Maria was close friends with two of the shooting victims and one of them, Cindy Peak, had been expected for dinner at the governor's mansion on the day of the shooting.

Four days after the shooting, with large protests in the state calling for reforms, Lee declined to say whether he would support gun control measures but did say that "individuals who are a threat to themselves or to others shouldn't have access to weapons." In the wake of the scandals around the 2023 Tennessee House of Representatives expulsions, which occurred after protests in favor of gun control, Lee signed an executive order on April 11 strengthening background checks for gun purchases and also called for the state legislature to pass an "order of protection law". On August 8, 2023, Lee officially called for a special session of the General Assembly to be held on August 21 to focus on public safety in response to the shooting.

=== Health care ===
Lee opposes the expansion of TennCare, the state's Medicaid program, as allowed by the Affordable Care Act. As governor, he has rejected proposals to expand TennCare. Lee has supported calls from dentists to extend TennCare to pregnant women who need dental care.

==== Family leave ====
In January 2020, Lee signed an executive order effective March 1, 2020, that offered state employees three months' paid leave for new parents and caregivers of sick relatives. He called it "one of the most cost-effective investments in the families of our state employees in recent history".

=== Labor unions ===
In 2024, Lee joined five other Republican governors (Kay Ivey of Alabama, Brian Kemp of Georgia, Tate Reeves of Mississippi, Henry McMaster of South Carolina, and Greg Abbott of Texas) in a statement opposing the United Auto Workers unionization campaign.

=== LGBT issues ===
Lee supports allowing religious foster care and adoption agencies to prohibit same-sex married couples from adopting children. In January 2020, he signed into law a bill that assures continued taxpayer funding of faith-based foster care and adoption agencies that exclude LGBT families and others based on religious beliefs. Nike and Amazon released statements opposing the bill. Lee signed legislation banning transgender athletes from participating in sports opposite to their biological sex, making Tennessee the third state to do so. In May 2021, he signed a bathroom bill that prohibits transgender people from accessing public school bathrooms that correspond to their gender identity.

In May 2021, Lee signed legislation requiring businesses that serve transgender customers equally with restrooms to display warning signs that they do so. LGBT activists, Democrats, and some Republicans criticized the bill as an attempt to shame and harm businesses. Many businesses and business leaders threatened to leave Tennessee in protest of these bills. The American Civil Liberties Union sued to stop the law, and in July 2021, a federal judge granted a preliminary injunction blocking its enforcement, finding that it violated the First Amendment.

On February 27, 2023, Lee declared that he would sign the Adult Entertainment Act, which bans public drag performances; the first violation of the law would be a misdemeanor, while the second would be a felony. Lee's announcement came two days after photos of him dressed in drag at a powderpuff game went viral on social media platform Reddit. The 1977 high school yearbook photo shows Lee dressed as a female cheerleader, wearing a wig and pearl necklace. Lee signed the anti-drag bill into law on March 2, 2023. In June 2023, a federal court blocked the law as unconstitutional under the First Amendment. The Tennessee attorney general has appealed the decision. In 2024, Lee signed a law allowing public officials to refuse to marry couples "for reasons of conscience or other religious beliefs", including same-sex couples.

== Personal life ==
Lee lives in Fernvale with his second wife, Maria, whom he married in October 2008. His first wife, Carol Ann, died in 2000 in a horseback riding accident. After her death, Lee took extended time off from his construction company to raise his four children.

Lee previously served as a member of the board of trustees of Belmont University, chairman of the YMCA of Middle Tennessee, president of the Associated Builders and Contractors, and a board member of the Hope Clinic for Women and the Men of Valor Prison Ministry.

== Electoral history ==
=== 2018 election ===
Tennessee gubernatorial Republican primary, 2018
Party	Candidate	Votes	%
Republican	Bill Lee	291,414	36.75
Republican	Randy Boyd	193,054	24.35
Republican	Diane Black	182,457	23.01
Republican	Beth Harwell	121,484	15.32
Republican	Kay White	3,215	0.41
Republican	Basil Marceaux	1,264	0.16
Total votes		792,888	100.0

2018 Tennessee gubernatorial election
Party	Candidate	Votes	%	±%
Republican	Bill Lee	1,336,106	59.56%	−10.75%
Democratic	Karl Dean	864,863	38.55%	+15.71%
Independent	Other candidates	42,314	1.89%	N/A
Write-in		11	0.00%	0.00%
Total votes		2,243,294	100.0%	N/A
Republican hold				

*This election had 28 candidates total.

=== 2022 election ===
Tennessee gubernatorial Republican primary, 2022
Party	Candidate	Votes	%
Republican	Bill Lee (incumbent)	494,362	100.00
Total votes		494,362	100.00

2022 Tennessee gubernatorial election
Party	Candidate	Votes	%	±%
Republican	Bill Lee (incumbent)	1,129,390	64.91%	+5.55
Democratic	Jason Martin	572,818	32.92%	−5.63
Independent	John Gentry	15,395	0.89%	N/A
Independent	Constance Every	10,277	0.59%	N/A
Independent	Deborah Rouse	3,772	0.22%	N/A
Independent	Rick Tyler	2,380	0.14%	N/A
Independent	Charles Van Morgan	1,862	0.11%	N/A
Independent	Basil Marceaux	1,568	0.09%	N/A
Independent	Alfred O'Neil	1,216	0.07%	N/A
Independent	Michael Scantland	815	0.05%	N/A
Write-In	Lemichael D. Wilson	386	0.02%	N/A
Write-In	Charles Carney	2	0.00%	N/A
Write-In	Stephen C. Maxwell	1	0.00%	N/A
Write-In	Kameron Parker Scott	0	0.00%	N/A
Total votes		1,739,882	100.00%	
Turnout		1,756,397	38.61%	−15.85%
Registered electors		4,549,183		
Republican hold				

Party political offices
Preceded by Bill Haslam	Republican nominee for Governor of Tennessee; 2018, 2022	Succeeded by Marsha Blackburn
Preceded by Kim Reynolds	Chair of the Republican Governors Association; 2023–2024	Succeeded by Brian Kemp
Political offices
Preceded by Bill Haslam	Governor of Tennessee; 2019–present	Incumbent
U.S. order of precedence (ceremonial)
Preceded by JD Vance as Vice President	Order of precedence of the United States; Within Tennessee	Succeeded by Mayor of city in which event is held
Preceded by JD Vance as Vice President	Order of precedence of the United States; Within Tennessee	Succeeded by Otherwise Mike Johnson as Speaker of the House
Preceded by Andy Beshear as Governor of Kentucky	Order of precedence of the United States; Outside Tennessee	Succeeded by Mike DeWine as Governor of Ohio
