= Tennessee State Route 96 =

Highway in Tennessee

State Route 96
- SR 96; primary in red, secondary in blue

Route information
- Maintained by TDOT
- Length: 126.7 mi (203.9 km)

Major junctions
- West end: US 70 in Dickson
- I-40 near Fairview; Natchez Trace Parkway near Franklin; US 31 / US 431 in Franklin; I-65 in Franklin; US 31A / US 41A in Triune; I-24 in Murfreesboro; US 41 / US 70S / US 231 / SR 99 in Murfreesboro; US 70 / SR 53 in Liberty; I-40 in Buffalo Valley; US 70N in Gentry
- North end: SR 53 in Granville

Location
- Country: United States
- State: Tennessee
- Counties: Dickson, Williamson, Davidson, Rutherford, Cannon, Wilson, DeKalb, Putnam, Smith, Jackson

Highway system
- Tennessee State Routes; Interstate; US; State
← SR 95	→ SR 97

State Route 96 (SR 96) is an east–west and north–south highway in Middle Tennessee. The road begins in Dickson and ends in Granville. The current length is 126.7 mi (203.9 km). Along its path it goes through 10 counties. Locals mostly refer to it as Highway 96.

SR 96 changes cardinal directions from east–west to North–South in DeKalb County after an unsigned concurrency with U.S. 70. Prior to 1962, SR 96 travelled through Williamson County under one segment via the communities of Leipers Fork and Fernvale.

== Route description ==
=== Dickson County ===
SR 96 begins as a primary highway in Dickson County in Dickson at an intersection with US 70/SR 1. It then goes southeast, leaving Dickson, before coming to an intersection with SR 47 in Burns. It then curves to the east and parallels I-40, passing just north of the I-40/I-840 interchange, before having an interchange with I-40 (Exit 182) just west of Fairview, just after crossing into Williamson County.

=== Williamson and Davidson counties ===
SR 96 then enters Fairview and has a trumpet interchange and become concurrent with SR 100. They then go northeast and cross over the southern part of the Highland Rim just before crossing into the southwest corner of Davidson County. SR 96 then separates from SR 100 and then turns southeast to cross back into Williamson County. Just after crossing the county line, SR 96 has an interchange with the Natchez Trace Parkway, just after passing under the Natchez Trace Parkway Bridge. It then goes through some wooded areas before having an intersection with SR 46 just before entering Franklin. SR 96 then travels through some suburban areas before intersecting and becoming concurrent with US 431/SR 106 in downtown. They first go south before SR 96 turns east at an intersection with US 31/SR 6, which is also where US 431/SR 106 split off and continue south. SR 96 then splits off from US 31/SR 6 and goes east, leaving downtown and having an intersection with SR 397 and then an interchange with I-65 (Exit 65) before leaving Franklin and continuing southeast. SR 96 then passes through some farmland before passing through Arrington and having an intersection with SR 252. It then begins paralleling I-840 just before entering Triune, where it has an intersection with US 31A/SR 11, just north of its interchange with I-840 (Exit 42). SR 96 then goes east and crosses over the Interstate without an interchange before crossing into Rutherford County.

=== Rutherford County ===
It then almost immediately has an intersection with SR 102 just south of Almaville, which is also just south of its interchange with I-840 (Exit 47). SR 96 then leaves the Interstate and passes through some rural countryside before entering Murfreesboro just before a partial cloverleaf interchange with I-24 (Exit 78). It then passes through a major retail district, passing by Stones River Mall and having an intersection and becoming concurrent with SR 99, before entering downtown and having an intersection with US 41/US 70S/US 231/SR 1/SR 10, with SR 96 curving to the northeast to become concurrent with US 231/SR 10 as they turn northeast at this intersection from the south. They go northeast, leaving downtown, for about one mile (1.6 km) before SR 96 turns east onto E Clark Blvd. for a short distance before turning northeast again onto Lascassas Pike. SR 96 then has an intersection with SR 268 before it leaves Murfreesboro and continues northeast through countryside once more. It then passes through Lascassas and intersects and has a short concurrency with SR 266. SR 96 then curves to the east and passes through some more rural farmland and countryside, passing through Milton before crossing into northwest corner Cannon County.

=== Cannon and Wilson counties ===
SR 96 passes through Auburntown, where it has an intersection with the northern terminus of SR 145, before crossing into the southeast corner of Wilson County. It intersects with SR 267 just across the county line, south of Statesville, before passing through Prosperity and Cottage Home and into DeKalb County.

=== DeKalb County ===
Coming to an intersection with US 70/SR 26/SR 53 near Liberty, SR 96 turns east along a concurrency. They enter Liberty at an intersection where SR 53 separates and turns south toward Woodbury. The routes then pass through Liberty and Dowelltown and ascend the Highland Rim before SR 96 separates from US 70/SR 26, just northwest of Smithville. It becomes signed as a north–south route along a very curvy secondary highway known as Dale Ridge Road. It makes its way northward, encountering and serving as the southern terminus of SR 264. It follows along the shoreline of Center Hill Lake before coming to an intersection with SR 141 at Center Hill Dam. The two routes become concurrent and cross overtop Center Hill Dam together before separating at the entrance to Edgar Evins State Park, with SR 96 turning north toward Putnam County.

=== Putnam and Smith counties ===
It crosses the county line and immediately enters Buffalo Valley, where it has another interchange with I-40 (Exit 268). It then winds north through farmland, crossing briefly into the far eastern portion of Smith County before reentering Putnam County. SR 96 quickly comes to an intersection with US 70N/SR 24 east of Chestnut Mound, at which point it becomes concurrent. They go east through Gentry and wind through more hilly terrain before SR 96 splits off and winds north as Shaw Branch Road, before crossing into Jackson County. Rock Springs Road and Stanton Road follow routes from Buffalo Valley to Gentry that are over one mile (1.6 km) shorter without ever going through Smith County.

=== Jackson County ===
SR 96 then runs along Martin Creek, an arm of Cordell Hull Lake/Cumberland River, before entering Granville and terminating at SR 53 in town.

== Major intersections ==
County	Location	mi	km	Destinations	Notes
Dickson	Dickson	SR 96 begins as a primary route			
Dickson	Dickson	0.0	0.0	US 70 (E. College Street/SR 1) – Dickson, White Bluff	Western terminus; provides access to Montgomery Bell State Park
Dickson	Burns	2.1	3.4	SR 47 (Stuart Street) – Dickson, White Bluff	
Williamson	Fairview	10.4– 10.8	16.7– 17.4	I-40 – Memphis, Nashville	I-40 exit 182
Williamson	Fairview	15.1	24.3	SR 100 west (Fairview Boulevard) – Bon Aqua	Interchange; western end of SR 100 concurrency
Davidson	Nashville	20.7	33.3	SR 100 east – Pasquo, Belle Meade	Eastern end of SR 100 concurrency
Williamson	Bingham	24.1	38.8	Natchez Trace Parkway	Via short access road
Williamson	Bingham	27.6	44.4	SR 46 (Old Hillsboro Road) – Leipers Fork, Forest Hills	
Williamson	Franklin	32.4	52.1	US 431 north (Fifth Avenue/SR 106) – Forest Hills	Western end of US 431/SR 106 concurrency
Williamson	Franklin	32.5	52.3	US 31 south (Columbia Pike/SR 6) – Spring Hill US 431 south (Fifth Avenue/SR 106) – Lewisburg	Eastern end of US 431/SR 106 concurrency; western end of US 31/SR 6 concurrency
Williamson	Franklin	32.7	52.6	US 31 north (Main Street/SR 6) – Brentwood	Eastern end of US 31/SR 6 concurrency
Williamson	Franklin	34.2	55.0	SR 397 / US 31 Truck / US 431 Truck (Mack Hatcher Memorial Parkway)	Partial beltway around Franklin
Williamson	Franklin	35.3– 35.4	56.8– 57.0	I-65 – Nashville, Huntsville	I-65 exit 65
Williamson	Arrington	42.7	68.7	SR 252 north (Wilson Pike) – Brentwood	Southern terminus of SR 252
Williamson	Triune	45.7	73.5	US 31A / US 41A (Nolensville Road/SR 11) to I-840 (Exit 42) – Nolensville, Chapel Hill, Eagleville	
Rutherford	Almaville	49.9	80.3	SR 102 north (Almaville Road) to I-840 (Exit 47) – Smyrna	Southern terminus of SR 102
Rutherford	Murfreesboro	58.2– 58.5	93.7– 94.1	I-24 – Nashville, Chattanooga	I-24 exit 78
Rutherford	Murfreesboro	59.9	96.4	SR 99 west (New Salem Highway) – Eagleville	Western end of SR 99 concurrency
Rutherford	Murfreesboro	60.2– 60.6	96.9– 97.5	US 231 south / SR 99 east / US 41 / US 70S (Broad Street/SR 1/SR 10)	Eastern end of SR 99 concurrency; western end of US 231/SR 10 concurrency
Rutherford	Murfreesboro	61.4	98.8	US 231 north (Memorial Boulevard/SR 10) – Lebanon	Eastern end of US 231/SR 10 concurrency
Rutherford	Compton	66.6	107.2	SR 268 west (Compton Road)	Eastern terminus of SR 268
Rutherford	Lascassas	69.5	111.8	SR 266 south (E. Jefferson Pike) – Walterhill, Smyrna	Western end of SR 266 concurrency
Rutherford	Lascassas	70.3	113.1	SR 266 north (Cainsville Pike) – Norene, Lebanon	Eastern end of SR 266 concurrency
Cannon	Auburntown	80.8	130.0	SR 145 south (W. Main Street) – Woodbury	Northern terminus of SR 145
Wilson	Prosperity	82.9	133.4	SR 267 north (Statesville Road) – Statesville, Watertown	Southern terminus of SR 267
DeKalb	Liberty	87.6	141.0	US 70 west (SR 26) / SR 53 north – Alexandria	Western end of unsigned concurrency with US 70/SR 26/SR 53
DeKalb	Liberty	89.0	143.2	SR 53 south (Woodbury Highway) – Woodbury	Eastern end of SR 53 concurrency
DeKalb	Dowelltown	94.4	151.9	US 70 east (SR 26) – Smithville	Eastern end of unsigned concurrency with US 70/SR 26
DeKalb	Dowelltown	SR 96 becomes a secondary route			
DeKalb	Temperance Hall	99.1	159.5	SR 264 north (Hickman Road) – Gordonsville	Southern terminus of SR 264
DeKalb	Laurel Hill	105.0	169.0	SR 141 west (Lancaster Road) – Lancaster, Gordonsville	Western end of SR 141 concurrency; begins to cross Center Hill Dam
DeKalb	Laurel Hill	106.1	170.8	SR 141 east (Wolf Creek Road) – Silver Point; Edgar Evins State Park Road - Edgar Evins State Park	Eastern end of SR 141 concurrency; access road into state park
Putnam	Buffalo Valley	109.7– 109.8	176.5– 176.7	I-40 – Nashville, Knoxville	I-40 exit 268
Putnam	Buffalo Valley	113.3	182.3	US 70N west (Nashville Highway/SR 24) – Carthage, South Carthage	Western end of unsigned concurrency with US 70N/SR 24
Putnam	Gentry	116.0	186.7	US 70N east (Nashville Highway/SR 24) – Baxter	Eastern end of unsigned concurrency with US 70N/SR 24
Jackson	Granville	126.7	203.9	SR 53 (Granville Highway) – Gainesboro, Carthage	Northern terminus
1.000 mi = 1.609 km; 1.000 km = 0.621 mi: Concurrency terminus

== See also ==
- List of Tennessee state highways
