= Tennessee State Route 26 =

State highway in Tennessee, United States

State Route 26

Route information
- Maintained by TDOT
- Length: 59.25 mi (95.35 km)
- Existed: October 1, 1923–present

Major junctions
- East end: US 70 / SR 1 – Sparta
- SR 111 / US 70S – Sparta; SR 56 – Smithville; SR 96 – Liberty; SR 53 – Alexandria; I-40 – Lebanon; US 70N – Lebanon; US 231 – Lebanon
- West end: US 70 / US 70 Bus. – Lebanon

Location
- Country: United States
- State: Tennessee
- Counties: Wilson, DeKalb, White

Highway system
- Tennessee State Routes; Interstate; US; State
← SR 25	→ I-26

State Route 26 (SR 26) is an east–west highway in Middle Tennessee. The road begins in Lebanon and ends in Sparta. The current length is 59.25 mi (95.4 km).

== Route description ==
=== Wilson County ===
The highway runs an unsigned concurrency with U.S. Route 70 (US 70) for its entire length. It begins at an intersection with U.S. Route 70 Business (US 70 Bus) and US 70 in Lebanon as US 70 and SR 24 move east from Mt. Juliet. SR 26 moves around north Lebanon with US 70, as SR 24 continues with US 70 Bus through downtown Lebanon. At this point, SR 26/US 70 is known as West Baddour Pkwy and later as East High St. SR 26 then continues south on the east side of town as Sparta Pike, intersecting SR 24 once more–this time concurrent with US 70N–before leaving Lebanon. The concurrency moves southeast, passing under Interstate 40 (I-40) on its way to Watertown.

=== DeKalb County ===
SR 26/US 70 continues through Watertown and moves into DeKalb County, becoming Nashville Highway as it moves through the towns of Alexandria, Liberty, and Dowelltown. During this time, SR 26/US 70 runs two concurrencies with SR 53 (from Liberty to Alexandria) and SR 96 (from Liberty to just west of Smithville) with the routes briefly overlapping in Liberty so that all four routes run together.

After leaving Dowelltown, the highways go up a hill and end the concurrency with SR 96 at the top. SR 26/US 70 moves through Smithville as West Broad St, later East Broad St, and moves east, becoming Sparta Highway as it does so. It then crosses Center Hill Lake and moves into White County.

=== White County ===
It moves into the west side of Sparta and becomes West Brockman Way before having an interchange with SR 111 and US 70S, where US 70S ends. It then enters downtown and comes to an end at an intersection with SR 1, which US 70 continues east concurrent with towards Crossville.

== History ==
Until US 70 was commissioned in Tennessee in 1926, the route was signed solely as SR 26. Prior to the 1930s, SR 26 followed its current route in its entirety (except for any later bypasses), but turned north on a path towards Cookeville to intersect SR 24. That segment would later become SR 42 in the 1930s, and then SR 111 by the mid-1970s.

== Major intersections ==
County	Location	mi	km	Destinations	Notes
Wilson	Lebanon	0.0	0.0	US 70 Bus. east / US 70 west (W Main Street/SR 24) – Downtown Lebanon, Mount Juliet	Western end of US 70 concurrency; western terminus of US 70 Bus and SR 26
Wilson	Lebanon			US 231 (North Cumberland Street/SR 10) – Westmoreland, Murfreesboro	
Wilson	Lebanon			SR 266 south (N College Street) – Norene	Northern terminus of SR 266
Wilson	Lebanon			SR 141 north (Hartsville Pike) – Hartsville	Western end of SR 141 concurrency
Wilson	Lebanon			US 70N east / US 70 Bus. west (E Main Street/SR 24) – Carthage, Lebanon Business District	Eastern terminus of US 70 Bus; Western terminus of US 70N
Wilson	Lebanon			SR 141 east (Trousdale Ferry Pike) – Gordonsville	Eastern end of SR 141 concurrency
Wilson	Lebanon			I-40 – Nashville, Knoxville	I-40 Exit 239A-B eastbound and 239 westbound
Wilson				SR 265 west (Trammel Lane) to I-840 – Hermitage	Eastern terminus of SR 265; provides access to Cedars of Lebanon State Park
Wilson	Watertown			SR 267 south (Statesville Road) – Statesville	Northern terminus of SR 267
DeKalb	Alexandria			SR 53 north (Brush Creek Road) – Gordonsville	Western end of SR 53 concurrency
DeKalb				SR 96 west – Auburntown, Murfreesboro	Western end of SR 96 concurrency
DeKalb	Liberty			SR 53 south (Woodbury Highway) – Woodbury	Eastern end of SR 53 concurrency
DeKalb				SR 96 east (Dale Ridge Road) – Center Hill Dam	Eastern end of SR 96 concurrency
DeKalb	Smithville			SR 83 (New Home Road/Allen Ferry Road)	Partial loop around Smithville
DeKalb	Smithville			SR 146 south (South Mountain Street)	Northern terminus of SR 146
DeKalb	Smithville			SR 56 (Congress Boulevard) – Baxter, McMinnville	
White				SR 136 (Old Kentucky Road) – Cookeville, Rock Island	Provides access to Rock Island State Park
White	Sparta			US 70S west / SR 111 (Spencer Highway) – Cookeville, McMinnville, Spencer	Eastern terminus of US 70S; interchange
White	Sparta	59.25	95.35	SR 1 / US 70 east (Mayberry Street/W Bockman Way) to SR 111 – McMinnville, Crossville	Eastern terminus; US 70 continues east along SR 1 towards Crossville
1.000 mi = 1.609 km; 1.000 km = 0.621 mi: Concurrency terminus

== See also ==
- List of state routes in Tennessee
