= Tennessee State Route 267 =

Highway in Tennessee

State Route 267
- Statesville Road
- SR 267 highlighted in red

Route information
- Maintained by TDOT
- Length: 10.8 mi (17.4 km)
- Existed: July 1, 1983–present

Major junctions
- South end: SR 96 in Prosperity
- North end: US 70 in Watertown

Location
- Country: United States
- State: Tennessee
- Counties: Wilson

Highway system
- Tennessee State Routes; Interstate; US; State
← SR 266	→ SR 268

State Route 267 (SR 267), also known as Statesville Road, is a short secondary state highway in Wilson County, Tennessee, that connects SR 96 with U.S. Route 70 (US 70).

== Route description ==
SR 267 begins in the community of Prosperity at an intersection with SR 96. It winds its way northwest through farmland to pass through the community of Statesville. SR 267 then turns northward winds its way through some hills before entering the town of Watertown and coming to an end at an intersection with US 70 (Sparta Pike / SR 26). The entire route of SR 267 is a two-lane highway.

== Major intersections ==
The entire route is in Wilson County.

Location	mi	km	Destinations	Notes
Prosperity	0.0	0.0	SR 96 – Auburntown, Liberty	Southern terminus
Watertown	10.8	17.4	US 70 (Sparta Pike/SR 26) – Lebanon, Alexandria	Northern terminus
1.000 mi = 1.609 km; 1.000 km = 0.621 mi
