= Tennessee State Route 266 =

State highway in Tennessee, United States

State Route 266
- SR 266 highlighted in red

Route information
- Maintained by TDOT
- Length: 39.81 mi (64.07 km)
- Existed: July 1, 1983–present

Major junctions
- South end: I-24 in Smyrna
- US 41 / US 70S in Smyrna; I-840 east of Smyrna; US 231 in Walterhill
- North end: US 70 in Lebanon

Location
- Country: United States
- State: Tennessee
- Counties: Rutherford, Wilson

Highway system
- Tennessee State Routes; Interstate; US; State
← SR 265	→ SR 267

State Route 266 (SR 266) is a state highway in Middle Tennessee. The southern terminus is in a currently undeveloped section of Smyrna at an interchange with I-24. The northern terminus is in Lebanon at an intersection with US 70.

== Route description ==
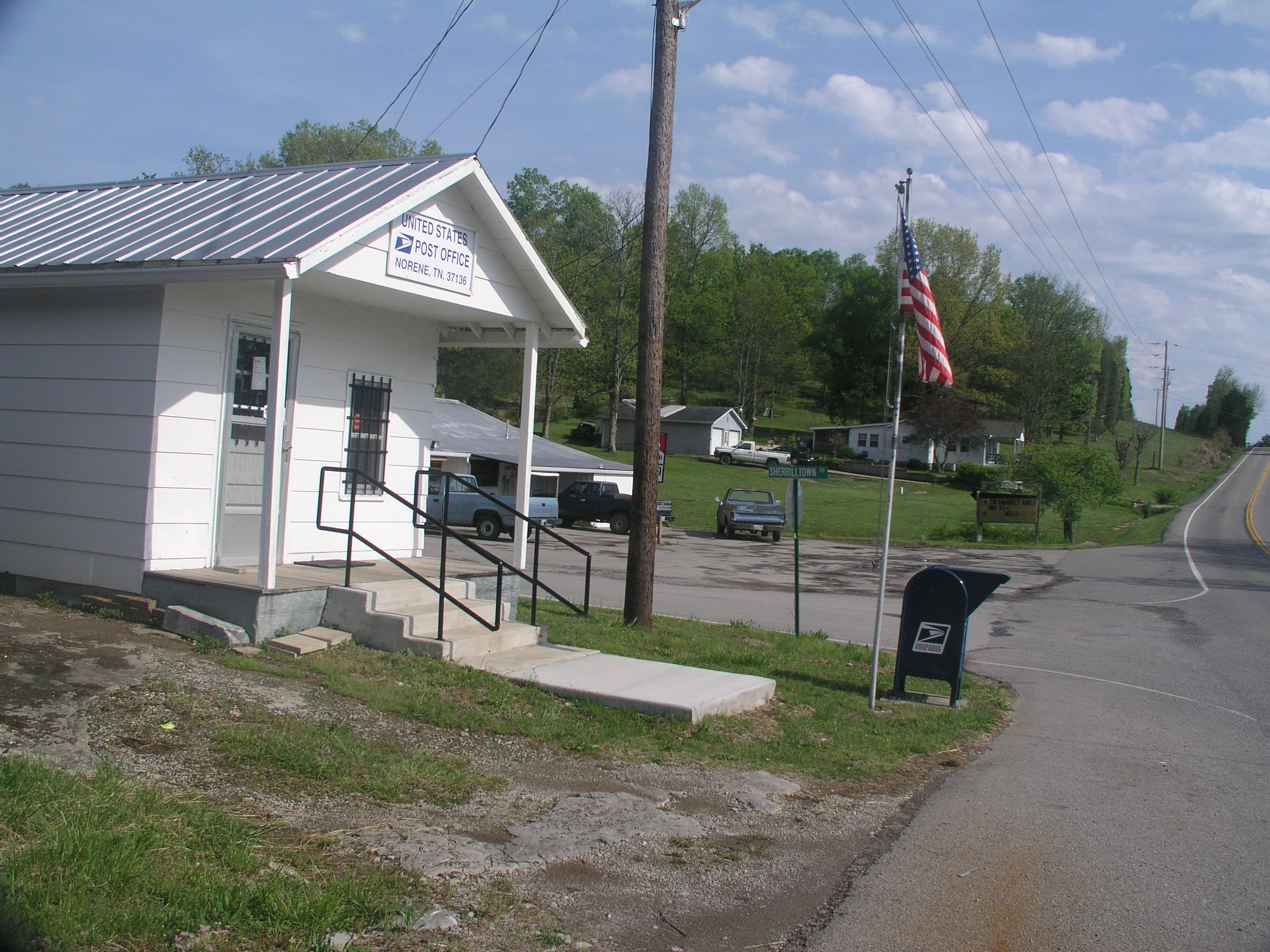
State Route 266 in Norene, Tennessee

=== Rutherford County ===
SR 266 begins in Rutherford County in Smyrna at an interchange with I-24 (Exit 66). It goes east as a 4-lane, changing to a 6-lane, divided highway called Sam Ridley Parkway, a major thoroughfare featuring numerous strip malls, apartments, a high school, and a hospital. It has an interchange with US 41/US 70S/SR 1 (N Lowry Street) on the southern edge of Smyrna Airport. SR 266 then becomes undivided and continues east to an intersection with SR 102 (Nissan Drive), where Sam Ridley Parkway officially end and SR 266 continues east as Jefferson Pike. The highway then narrows to 2-lanes and crosses a bridge over the Stones River just south of Percy Priest Lake, where it leaves Smyrna. SR 266 then passes through rural areas to come to have an interchange with I-840 (Exit 61) before passing through Walterhill and having an intersection with US 231/SR 10. SR 266 then continues east through farmland to pass through Lascassas, where it has a short concurrency with SR 96 before turning northward and crossing into Wilson County.

=== Wilson County ===
SR 266 winds its way northward through farmland as Cainsville Road, where it passes through Norene and has an intersection with SR 265. The highway then enters Lebanon and passes through an industrial area and has an intersection with Maddox-Simpson Parkway before crossing an overpass over I-40. SR 266 continues north through industrial areas before entering downtown at an intersection with Tennessee Boulevard, where it becomes S College Street. It goes north to have an intersection with US 70 Bus./SR 24 (E Main Street), where it becomes N College Street, before coming to an end at an intersection with US 70/SR 26 (E High Street) in a business district.

== History ==
For most of its length through Smyrna, SR 266 is a 4-lane, now changing to a 6-lane, highway called Sam Ridley Parkway, named for the mayor of the city from 1947 to 1987. (Sam Ridley was forced to resign in 1987 due to a conflict-of-interest suit; as a testament to his popularity, his identical twin brother Knox was promptly instated as mayor.) Once an undeveloped highway forming part of a beltway around Smyrna and serving the Smyrna Airport, Sam Ridley Parkway now features numerous strip malls, apartments, and even a hospital.

The Tennessee General Assembly, along with State Representative Mike Sparks and Senator Bill Ketron honored former Rutherford County Historian Ernie Johns by naming a section of Jefferson Pike, "Ernie Johns Honorary Highway."

Beginning in 2021, construction began on the Jefferson Pike section of highway from Sam Ridley Parkway to I-840 to widen it to four lanes.

== Major intersections ==
County	Location	mi	km	Destinations	Notes
Rutherford	Smyrna	0.0	0.0	I-24 – Nashville, Chattanooga	Southern terminus; exits 66A-B on I-24
Rutherford	Smyrna			US 41 / US 70S (N Lowry Street/SR 1) – La Vergne, Downtown, Murfreesboro	Interchange
Rutherford	Smyrna			SR 102 south (Nissan Drive)	Northern terminus of SR 102
Rutherford	Smyrna			Bridge over the Stones River	
Rutherford				I-840 – Chattanooga, Knoxville	Exit 61 on I-840; former SR 840
Rutherford	Walterhill			US 231 (Lebanon Pike/SR 10) – Murfreesboro, Lebanon	Provides access to Cedars of Lebanon State Park and Nashville Superspeedway
Rutherford	Lascassas			SR 96 west (Lascassas Pike) – Murfreesboro	Southern end of SR 96 concurrency
Rutherford	Lascassas			SR 96 east (Lascassas Pike) – Auburntown	Northern end of SR 96 concurrency
Wilson				SR 265 (Chicken Road/Trammel Lane) – Mount Juliet, Watertown	Provides access to Cedars of Lebanon State Park
Wilson	Lebanon			US 70 Bus. (E Main Street/SR 24)	
Wilson	Lebanon	39.81	64.07	US 70 (SR 26 / East High Street) – Mount Juliet, Watertown	Northern terminus
1.000 mi = 1.609 km; 1.000 km = 0.621 mi: Concurrency terminus
