= Tennessee State Route 102 =

Highway in Tennessee

State Route 102
- SR 102 highlighted in red

Route information
- Maintained by TDOT
- Length: 13.1 mi (21.1 km)

Major junctions
- South end: SR 96 in Almaville
- I-840 in Almaville; I-24 in Smyrna; US 41 / US 70S in Smyrna
- North end: SR 266 in Smyrna

Location
- Country: United States
- State: Tennessee
- Counties: Rutherford

Highway system
- Tennessee State Routes; Interstate; US; State
← SR 101	→ SR 103

State Route 102 (SR 102) is a 18.56-mile-long (29.87 km) state highway that exists entirely within Rutherford County, Tennessee. Its southern terminus is in Almaville, an unincorporated community in the western part of the county, at SR 96. Its northern terminus is in Smyrna.

== Route description ==
The southern half of SR 102 is called Almaville Road and has an interchange with I-840. The two-lane road travels north through rural, undeveloped land until reaching the rapidly growing residential and warehouse areas just outside Smyrna and expanding to four lanes. (The city has rapidly been annexing this land in recent years.) After an interchange with I-24, SR 102 becomes Lee Victory Parkway, named after a prominent local politician. There is a one-quadrant interchange with Old Nashville Highway. After an interchange with US 41/US 70S, SR 102 becomes Nissan Drive, named for the massive Nissan automobile manufacturing facility that faces the east side of the highway. The highway's northern terminus is at Jefferson Pike; northbound traffic on SR 102 continues westbound on Sam Ridley Parkway/SR 266 on its way back towards I-24. Thus, the combination of SR 102 and SR 266 forms a partial beltway around Smyrna.

== Major intersections ==
The entire route is in Rutherford County.

Location	mi	km	Destinations	Notes
Almaville	0.0	0.0	SR 96 – Franklin, Murfreesboro	Southern terminus
Almaville			I-840 – Franklin, Murfreesboro	I-840 exit 47
Smyrna			I-24 – Nashville, Chattanooga	I-24 exit 70
Smyrna			Old Nashville Highway	One-quadrant interchange
Smyrna			US 41 / US 70S (S Lowry Street/SR 1) – Downtown Smyrna, La Vergne, Murfreesboro	Interchange
Smyrna			SR 266 (Sam Ridley Parkway/Jefferson Pike)	Northern terminus; provides access to Smyrna Airport
1.000 mi = 1.609 km; 1.000 km = 0.621 mi
