= Tennessee State Route 268 =

State highway in Tennessee, United States

State Route 268
- Thompson Lane; Compton Road
- SR 268 highlighted in red

Route information
- Maintained by TDOT
- Length: 7.41 mi (11.93 km)
- Existed: July 1, 1983–present

Major junctions
- West end: US 41 / US 70S in Murfreesboro
- US 231 in Murfreesboro
- East end: SR 96 near Murfreesboro

Location
- Country: United States
- State: Tennessee
- Counties: Rutherford

Highway system
- Tennessee State Routes; Interstate; US; State
← SR 267	→ I-269

State Route 268 (SR 268) is a secondary state highway in Rutherford County and Murfreesboro, Tennessee, USA.

== Route description ==
SR 268 runs from US 41/US 70S/SR 1 (North West Broad Street) on the north west side of Murfreesboro, to its Eastern terminus with SR 96 (Lascassas Pike), north-east of Murfreesboro.

It crosses the West Fork of the Stones River near its western end as it travels through the suburbs along the northern and western sides of Murfreesboro as a 2-lane highway, where it has an intersection with US 231/SR 10 (Memorial Boulevard). The highway then leaves the Murfreesboro city limits shortly before coming to its eastern end.

Locally, this route is known as Thompson Lane from US 41/US 70S to US 231 and Compton Road from US 231 to SR 96.

== Major intersections ==
The entire route is in Rutherford County.

Location	mi	km	Destinations	Notes
Murfreesboro	0.0	0.0	US 41 / US 70S (NW Broad Street/SR 1) – Smyrna, Downtown	Western terminus
Murfreesboro			Bridge over the West Fork of the Stones River	
Murfreesboro			US 231 (Memorial Boulevard/SR 10) – Downtown, Lebanon	
	7.41	11.93	SR 96 (Lascassas Pike) – Downtown, Lascassas, Auburntown	Eastern terminus
1.000 mi = 1.609 km; 1.000 km = 0.621 mi

== See also ==
- List of Tennessee state highways
- Tennessee Department of Transportation
