= Statesville =

Statesville may refer to the following places in the United States:

- Statesville, North Carolina
- Statesville, Tennessee

== See also ==
- Stateville Correctional Center
