= Tom Little (cartoonist) =

American editorial cartoonist (1898–1972)

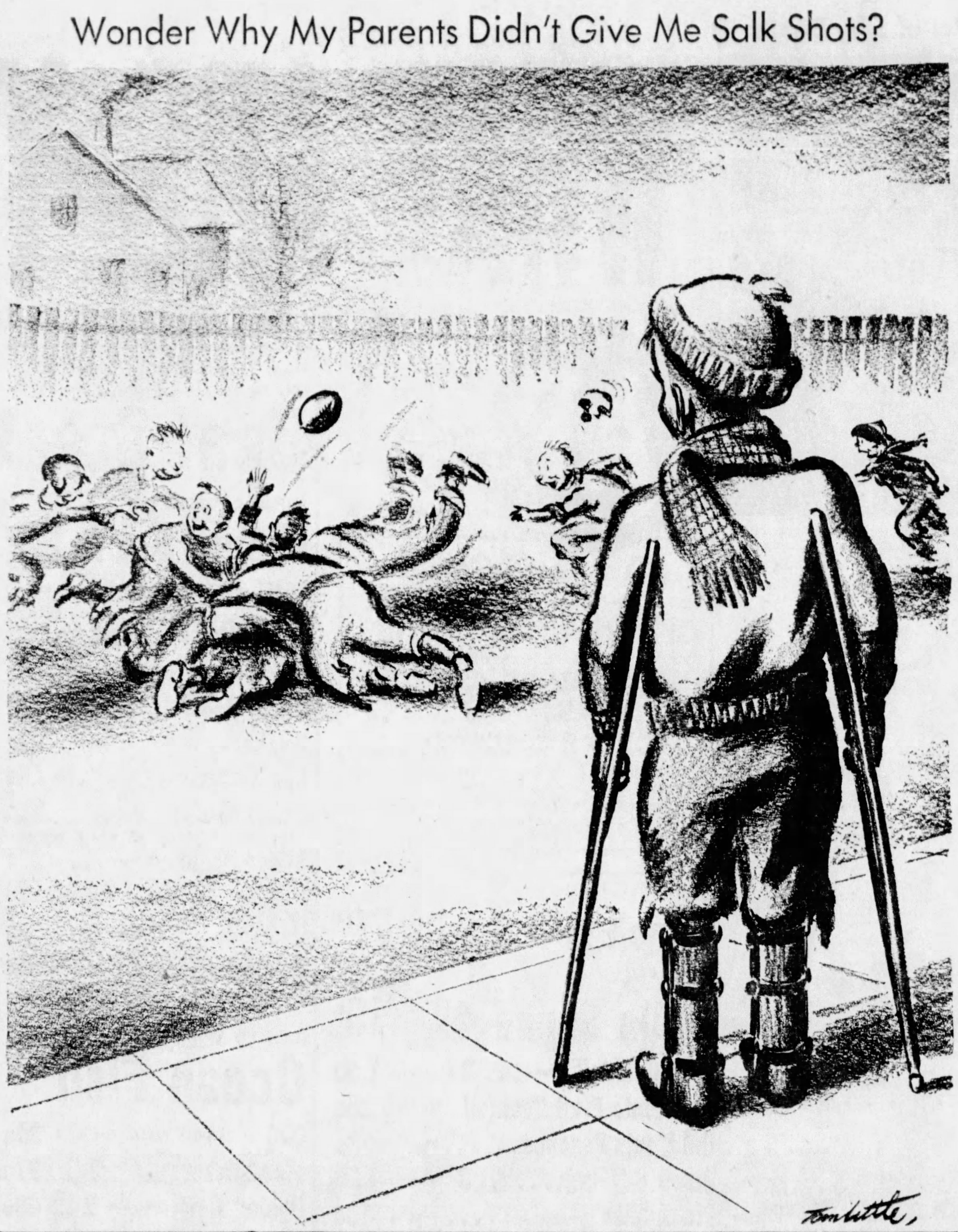
"Wonder Why My Parents Didn't Give Me Salk Shots?", the cartoon for which Little received the Pulitzer Prize for Editorial Cartooning

Thomas Little (September 27, 1898 – June 20, 1972) was an American editorial cartoonist. Working for The Nashville Tennessean, he won the Pulitzer Prize for Editorial Cartooning in 1957.

== Biography ==
Little was born in Snatch (now called Peytonsville) in an extremely rural part of Williamson County, Tennessee. His father died when he was two, and his family lived with his grandfather, who taught Little to draw before he could even write. His first job was picking potatoes for 50 cents a day, but the next year he entered the news business at age nine by folding issues of the Williamson County News.

Little studied at the Watkins Institute (1912–15) and the Montgomery Bell Academy (1917–18). He joined the Tennessean in 1916 and became a police reporter there in 1919. His tenure at the paper was interrupted by service in the US Army (at 5'2", he was rejected by the US Marines for being underweight) and a year (1923–24) as a reporter and cartoonist at the syndicate of the New York Herald Tribune.

Prompted by his mother's illness, he returned to the Tennessean. He became city editor in 1931, but following a dispute with the publisher he left that post in 1937. He began drawing editorial cartoons for the Tennessean in 1934 and drew exclusively after abandoning editing and reporting in 1937. He had been tutored by fellow Pulitzer winner Carey Orr before Orr left for the Chicago Tribune in 1917, but a stronger influence was the work of another winner, Dan Fitzpatrick of the St. Louis Post-Dispatch. His drawing style resembled Fitzpatrick's and the work of both men was noted for biting content. For his part, Fitzpatrick disliked the resemblance and considered Little an "imitator". Little became one of the most influential and republished cartoonists in the US. His Pulitzer-winner cartoon featured a young boy with crutches and leg braces watching other boys play football, and is captioned "Wonder why my parents didn't give me Salk shots?"

In addition to the Pulitzer, Little won a National Headliner Award in 1948, a Christopher Award in 1953, and a Freedoms Foundation Medal in 1955 and 1956.

Beginning in 1934, Little collaborated with Tom Sims (writer of Popeye) on a single panel comic strip for King Features called Sunflower Street, depicting the lives of rural African-Americans. Though well-intentioned, the strip was cancelled in 1949 for fear that the strip would be viewed as condescending and draw racially based complaints.

Little married Helen Dahnke of Union City, TN (1900-1938) in 1927; she was an editor for The Nashville Tennessean.

Little retired in 1970.
