= Martin Creek (Tennessee) =

Stream in Tennessee, United States

Coordinates: 36.2729°N 85.7996°W

Martin Creek is a large stream in Putnam and Jackson Counties in Middle Tennessee. It's a tributary of the Cumberland River.

The headwaters of Martin Creek start off on the Highland Rim less than a mile north of downtown Bloomington Springs entirely in Putnam County. The creek quickly plummets off of the Rim into the Outer Nashville Basin, starts forming the Jackson County line off and on and dries up, then it quickly picks up the Hatfield Hollow (also known as Flatt Hollow) Branch and Brown Hollow Branch while still being dry. At that point, it starts to develop a visibly wide floodplain between the steep escarpment hills and emerges as a perennial stream in the Broadwater Branch Road ford between the Johnson Hollow Branch and Carrington Hollow Branch confluences. It later picks up the Puncheoncamp Branch and McBroom Branch then later picks up the Shaw Branch after Martin Creek Road bridges over it for the second and final time.

The Stanton Hollow Branch is its penultimate major tributary before it enters Cordell Hull Lake and completely leaves Putnam County (entering Jackson County entirely), and Spring Fork Branch is final major tributary touching the Putnam County line. Nonetheless, the Chaffin Branch is a minor tributary entering between the Spring Fork confluence and Cordell Hull embayment that happens to have a name despite its tiny size and also touches the Putnam County line. The Burgis Branch is a similar minor named tributary that is entirely in Jackson County and the first named tributary to enter the embayment. The penultimate major tributary is the Lambert Hollow Branch that enters across the peninsula from where Granville is, while the final tributary is the Dry Fork that also enters on the right bank facing away from Granville. The only state route to cross Martin Creek is State Route 53 in Granville right at the confluence with the Cumberland River.

== Dry Fork Martin Creek ==
The Dry Fork Martin Creek is a far shorter branch of the main Martin Creek, with the Harris Hollow Branch, Huff Branch and Williamson Branch being major tributaries of the Dry Fork (the latter two into the Cordell Hull embayment). The Dry Fork is a dry wash even after its confluences with the Harris Hollow and smaller Pinhook Hollow Branch, unlike its perennial parent.

== Martin Creek Road ==
Martin Creek Road is a collector road that closely follows the creek and serves as the main street of Granville (where it's called Clover Street) and Bloomington Springs. The road is considered a minor collector by Putnam County's Major Thoroughfare Plan along the county-maintained portion and a major collector by the TDOT along the state-maintained portion (including Clover Street).
