= Peytonsville, Tennessee =

- Unincorporated community
- Location within Tennessee Location within the United States
- Coordinates: 35°49′06″N 86°46′46″W
- Country: United States
- State: Tennessee
- County: Williamson
- Elevation: 791 ft (241 m)
- Time zone: UTC-6 (Central (CST))
  - Summer (DST): UTC-5 (CDT)
- Area code: 615
- GNIS feature ID: 1297292

Peytonsville (formerly known as Snatch and Snatchett) is an unincorporated community in Williamson County, Tennessee. Peytonsville is located near Interstate 840 8.9 miles (14.3 km) southeast of Franklin. The Nathaniel Smithson House, which is listed on the National Register of Historic Places, is located in Peytonsville.

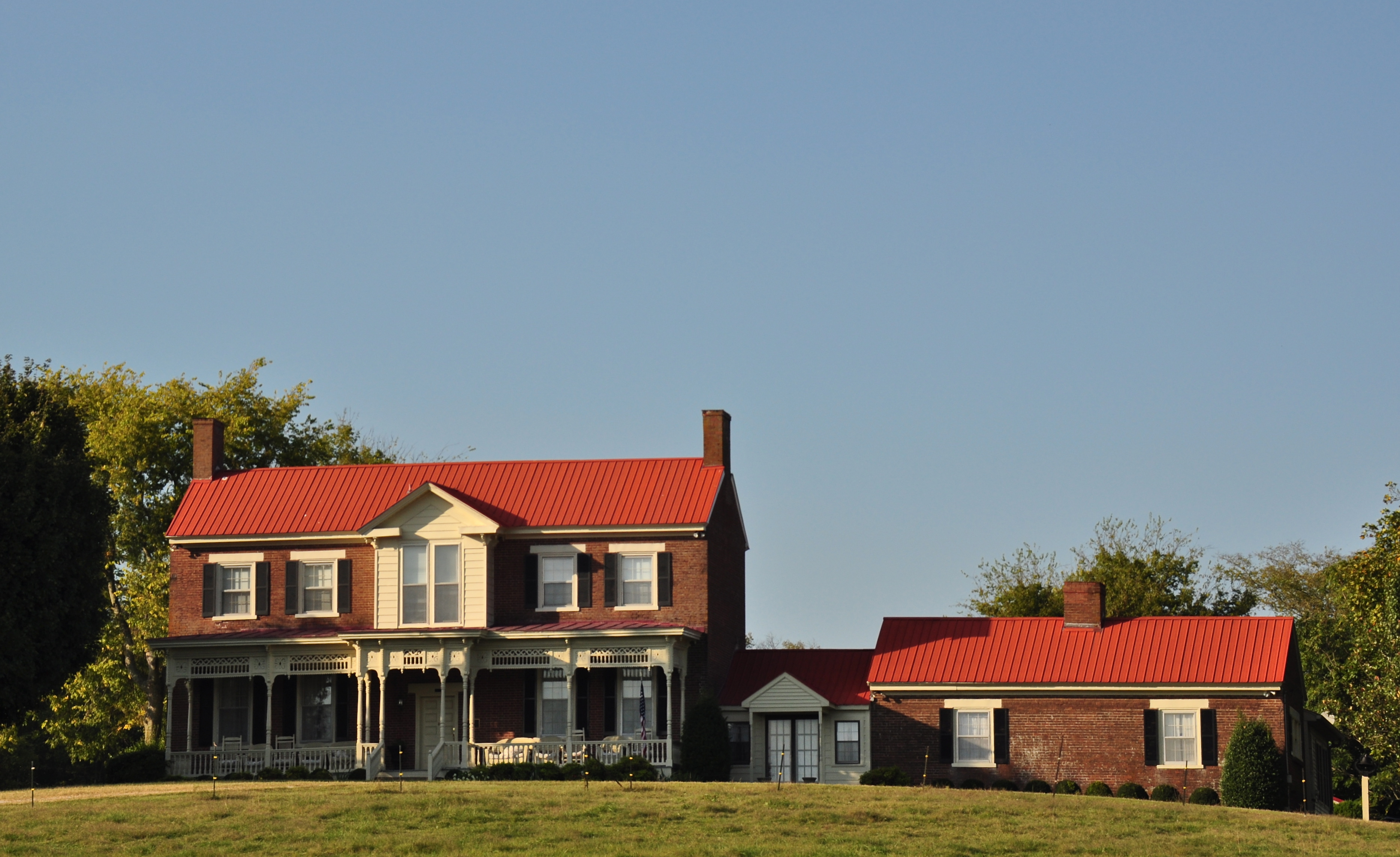
The Nathaniel Smithson House is located in Peytonsville.

== Notable people ==
- Tom Little (1898–1972), editorial cartoonist
