= Interstate 840 (Tennessee) =

Interstate Highway in Tennessee

Interstate 840
- Tennessee National Guard Parkway
- I-840 highlighted in red

Route information
- Auxiliary route of I-40
- Maintained by TDOT
- Length: 77.28 mi (124.37 km)
- Existed: August 12, 2016–present
- History: Completed November 2, 2012 (as SR 840)
- NHS: Entire route

Major junctions
- West end: I-40 near Dickson
- I-65 near Franklin; I-24 near Murfreesboro
- East end: I-40 near Lebanon

Location
- Country: United States
- State: Tennessee
- Counties: Dickson, Hickman, Williamson, Rutherford, Wilson

Highway system
- Interstate Highway System; Main; Auxiliary; Suffixed; Business; Future; Tennessee State Routes; Interstate; US; State
← SR 690	→ SR 1

Interstate 840 (I-840), formerly State Route 840 (SR 840), is a freeway that serves as an outer bypass route around Nashville, Tennessee. Built by the Tennessee Department of Transportation (TDOT), it is also designated as Tennessee National Guard Parkway. At 77.28 miles (124.37 km) long, it is the tenth-longest auxiliary Interstate Highway in the nation. The route serves the cities of Lebanon, Murfreesboro, Franklin, and Dickson, all suburbs of Nashville.

First proposed by former Governor Lamar Alexander as part of a system of Bicentennial Parkways, I-840 was constructed between 1991 and 2012. The highway was originally planned as an Interstate Highway but was constructed entirely with state funds and initially designated as a state route for this reason. In 2015, the Federal Highway Administration (FHWA) and the American Association of State Highway and Transportation Officials (AASHTO) approved TDOT's request to redesignate SR 840 as I-840 as part of its integration into the Interstate Highway System. On August 12, 2016, TDOT announced that the route had officially been redesignated as I-840 and that resigning work would begin.

== Route description ==
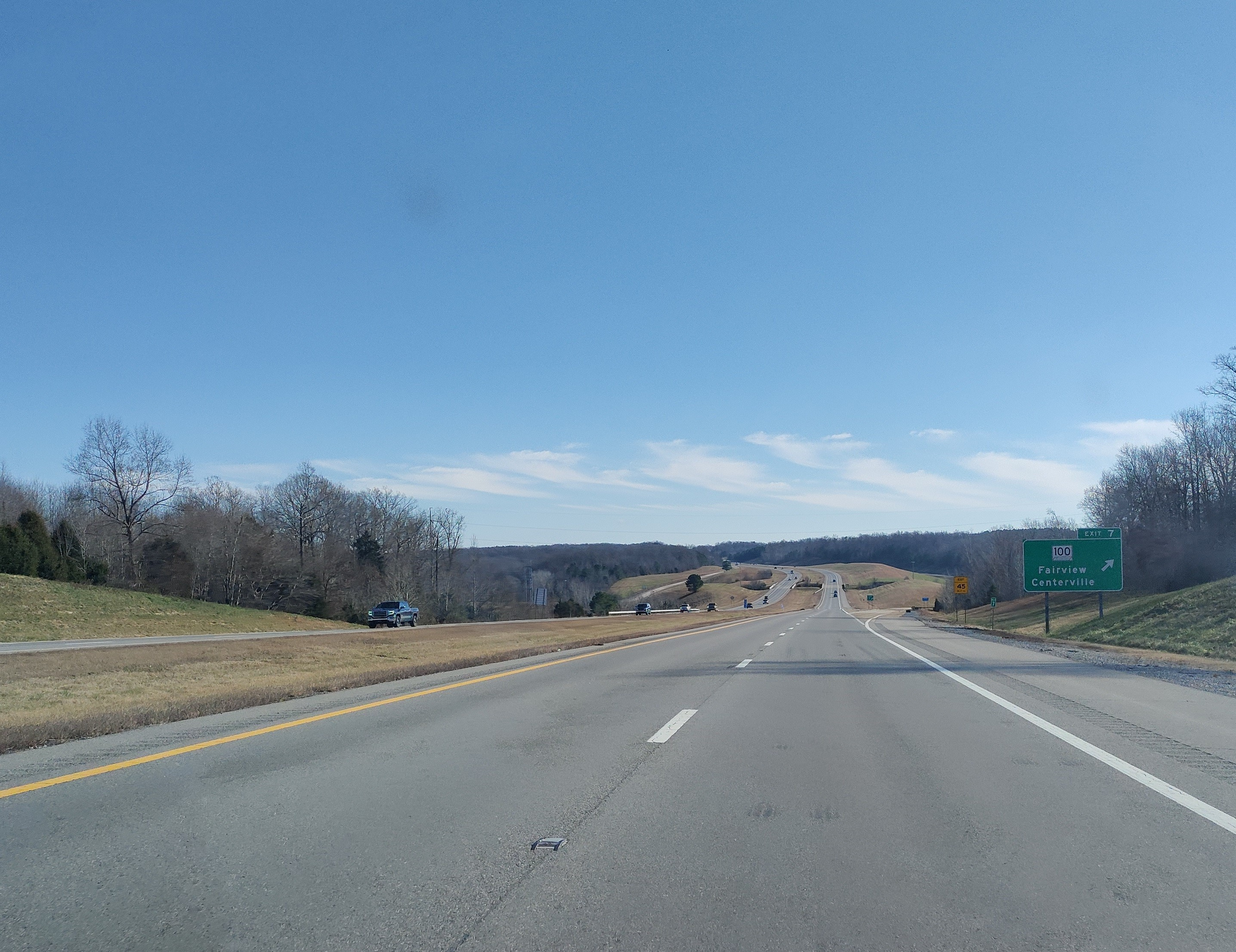
I-840 eastbound at the SR 100 interchange

I-840 is maintained by the Tennessee Department of Transportation (TDOT), along with all other Interstate, US, and state highways in Tennessee. In 2025, annual average daily traffic (AADT) volumes ranged from 13,232 vehicles at the western terminus to 68,974 vehicles between I-24 and U.S. Route 41/70S (US 41/70S).

I-840 begins at an interchange with I-40 in Dickson County southeast of Dickson and Burns. It initially runs southeast through a rural area, passing through a mix of farmland and woodlands characterized by a terrain made up of rolling hills, the eastbound lanes briefly gaining a truck climbing lane. The highway crosses into Hickman County about five miles (8.0 km) later. The route remains in Hickman County for less than 1.5 miles (2.4 km) before crossing into Williamson County and reaching an interchange with SR 100 about one mile (1.6 km) later. I-840 continues through a predominantly rural area over the next five miles (8.0 km), alternating between farmland and woodlands before transitioning into a region characterized by dense woodlands, rolling hills with moderate grades, and several streams and creeks. About two miles (3.2 km) beyond this point, I-840 reaches SR 46 at an interchange near the community of Leiper's Fork. About three miles (4.8 km) later, I-840 crosses the Natchez Trace Parkway and gradually turns east, continuing through similar terrain. After about seven miles (11 km), I-840 passes through flat terrain consisting primarily of farmland and woodlands over the next approximately eight miles (13 km) before briefly entering a suburban area south of Franklin and coming to an interchange with US 31 (US 31, Columbia Pike). About two miles (3.2 km) beyond this point is an interchange with US 431 (Lewisburg Pike). Less than one mile (1.6 km) later, I-840 comes to an interchange with I-65 that resembles a combination interchange, containing two loop ramps and two underpass ramps that cross I-840 combined.

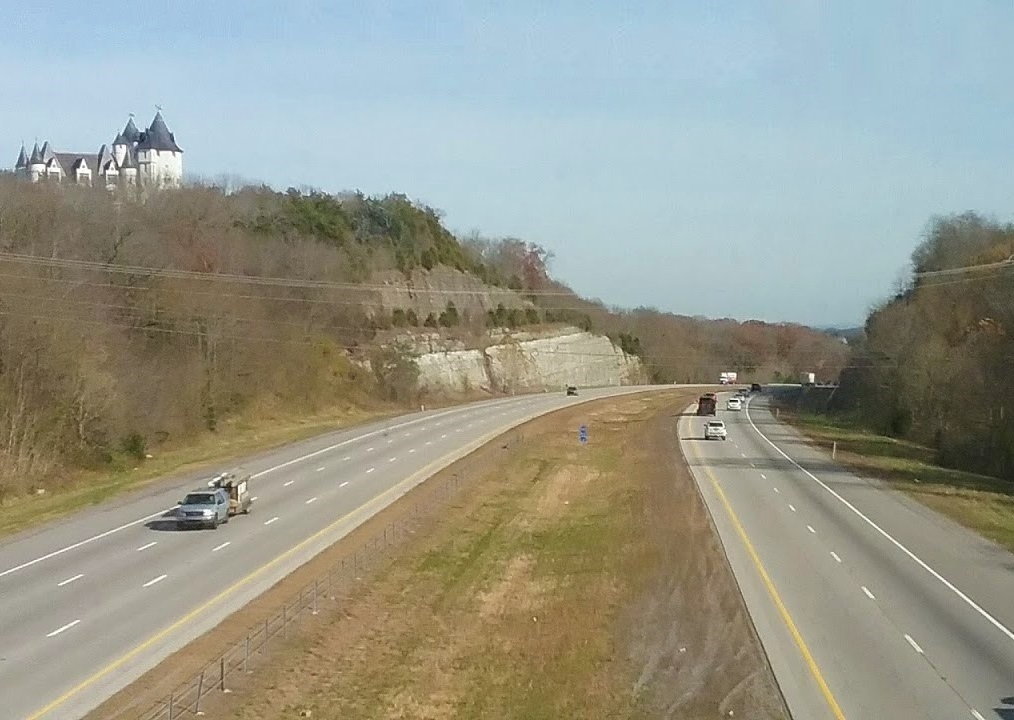
I-840 from SR 96 near the Williamson–Rutherford county line

After this interchange, I-840 crosses a steep hill and continues through terrain consisting of several rolling hills, some with relatively steep grades, and crosses the Harpeth River about eight miles (13 km) later. Three miles (4.8 km) later, I-840 comes to an interchange with U.S. Route 31 Alternate (US 31A) and US 41A near the community of Triune. About three miles (4.8 km) later, I-840 crosses SR 96 at the top of a large hill and begins a steep downgrade; the westbound lanes utilize a truck climbing lane over a short distance to ascend the hill from the east. It then crosses into Rutherford County, entering a more flat terrain and another suburban area, and, about eight miles (13 km) later, I-840 comes to an interchange with I-24 northwest of Murfreesboro. This interchange is almost a complete cloverleaf, containing three loop ramps and one flyover. The route then turns northeast, traveling through a relatively flat region with little elevation change and interchanges with US 41 and US 70S in a combination interchange about two miles (3.2 km) later. About 0.75 miles (1.21 km) later, I-840 crosses the west fork of the Stones River, gradually turning northwest. About four miles (6.4 km) later, the highway turns sharply northeast and crosses the east fork of the Stones River about one mile (1.6 km) beyond this point. About 1.5 miles (2.4 km) later, I-840 shifts north and, another 1.5 miles (2.4 km) later, crosses the Fall Creek impoundment of J. Percy Priest Lake. A short distance later is an interchange with the western terminus of SR 452 (Bill France Boulevard). I-840 then crosses into Wilson County less than one mile (1.6 km) later and has an interchange with SR 109 about six miles (9.7 km) beyond this point. The route then turns northeast and, about 3.8 miles (6.1 km) later, reaches its eastern terminus with I-40 west of Lebanon.

== History ==
=== Planning and construction ===
State Route 840
- Location: Dickson–Lebanon
- Length: 77.28 mi (124.37 km)
- Existed: 1991–2016

The route that is now I-840 had its origins in the 1975 Tennessee Highway System Plan issued by TDOT for the next four years, which first identified the need for an outer beltway around Nashville by 1995. The I-840 project was initiated in 1986 with the passage of the Better Roads Program by the Tennessee General Assembly. This program, which had been proposed and spearheaded by then-governor Lamar Alexander, increased the state's gasoline and diesel taxes to fund six new freeway projects and a backlog of 15 projects that had been labeled as top priorities, as well as other projects. I-840 was the largest of these six freeway projects, dubbed "Bicentennial Parkways", and was initially expected to cost $351 million (equivalent to $873 million in 2025). While initially referred to as I-840 in the state plan, the highway was constructed entirely with state transportation funds and was officially designated as a state route. The 1986–1987 state budget contained the initial funding for the project. Planning work began in 1988, and the alignment for the first section was announced in December of that year. Survey and design work began in 1989, and the alignment for the remainder of the route was announced in January 1990. Planners considered using SR 396, a short controlled-access connector between US 31 and I-65 in Spring Hill, for part of I-840, but ultimately chose a location about six miles (9.7 km) to the north. The first contract for construction was awarded on August 2, 1991, and work progressed in stages.

The first section of I-840, located between I-40 in Lebanon and Stewart's Ferry Pike, opened on August 2, 1995. The segment between Stewart's Ferry Pike and I-24 near Murfreesboro was completed on November 21, 1996. On November 30, 2000, the section between I-24 and US 31A/US 41A near Triune was opened. The portion between US 31A/US 41A and US 431 (Lewisburg Pike) near Franklin, including the interchange with I-65, opened on October 18, 2001. The section between I-40 near Dickson and SR 100 opened on December 5, 2002. Due to high costs and environmental concerns, the proposed northern half of I-840 was indefinitely placed on hold in 2003. The short segment between US 431 and US 31 (Columbia Pike) opened to traffic on September 9, 2005.

Construction of the majority of I-840 was met with very little controversy. As work moved into predominantly rural southwestern Williamson County, however, a group of landowners opposed to the route began a movement to stop its construction in 1997. Between the late 1990s and mid-2000s, these landowners, spearheaded by singer-songwriter Gene Cotton, filed complaints and eventually lawsuits in an effort to have TDOT address both environmental and aesthetic issues, considerably slowing work on the segment between SR 100 and US 31. A number of criticisms were also made about TDOT's handling of the construction of the route, such as an accusation that they chose to construct I-840 as a state route to avoid federally required environmental studies. TDOT awarded the first contract for the segment between SR 100 and SR 46 on June 14, 2002, but additional litigation forced TDOT to completely cease work on this segment three months later. As a result of these lawsuits, TDOT chose to slightly modify the design and employ new construction methods on the remaining sections the following year. These changes included construction of bridges over streams feeding the South Harpeth River instead of culverts; multiple wildlife underpasses; and designation of the remaining sections as a scenic highway, which prohibits billboards and uses brown powder-coated guardrail. A proposed interchange at Leiper's Creek Road was also canceled. As part of the redesign, TDOT formed a citizen's resource team, made up of nine local residents who worked with TDOT to select the final designs and alignment of these stretches.

On February 9, 2006, TDOT announced that the realignment of the final segment of I-840 had been chosen and that work on the unfinished sections would proceed. The first contract for construction of the segment between SR 100 and SR 46 was reawarded on June 1, 2007, and construction on I-840 resumed the following month. This segment opened on October 27, 2010. The contract for the segment between Leiper's Creek Road and US 31 was awarded on December 12, 2008, and, on February 19, 2010, TDOT awarded the final construction contract for I-840, the segment between SR 46 and Leiper's Creek Road. These two segments, the final 14.2 miles (22.9 km) of I-840, were opened on November 2, 2012. The project took 26 years to complete and cost $753.4 million (equivalent to $1.04 billion in 2025).

=== Northern loop ===
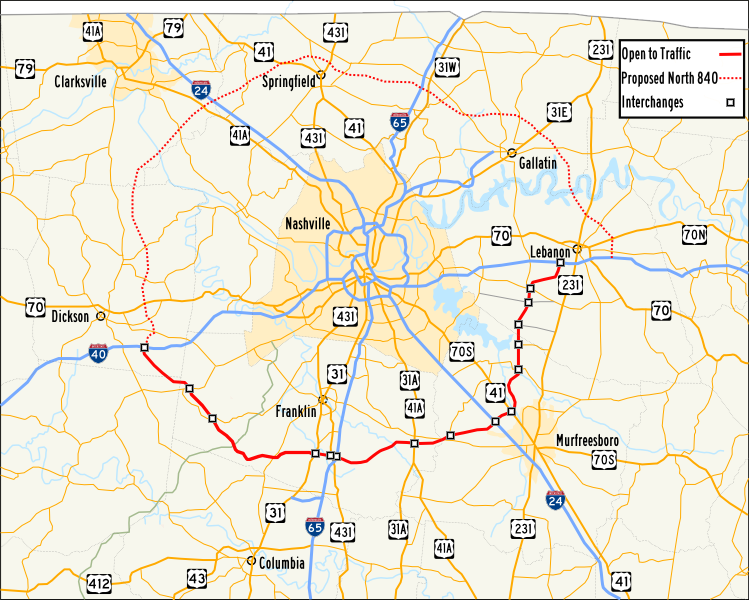
Map showing the complete section of I-840 and the approximate location of the formerly proposed northern segment.

TDOT was first authorized to begin studies for a northern loop of I-840 north of Nashville and past Dickson, Clarksville, Springfield, and Gallatin by the state legislature in 1993. Environmental studies began in 1994 and a draft environmental impact statement (DEIS) was released in 1995. On July 12, 1996, TDOT announced their first proposal for the northern section's alignment. Many residents in the predominantly rural and agricultural areas where the route was to pass were initially opposed. An entire circular loop would possibly be about 187 miles (301 km) long, with the northern segment ranging from 86 to 116 miles (138 to 187 km). Other important objections against additional extensions of I-840 include the hilly nature of the terrain north of Nashville (the Highland Rim), which would require huge and costly amounts of excavation, soil relocation, and bridge construction. In addition, the state was experiencing budget problems at the time, which would have further complicated the funding for such a project. On October 31, 2003, TDOT placed the northern loop plan on indefinite hold, citing a lack of documented transportation needs and lack of participation from local politicians. The western terminus of I-840 contains a very short unused extension, constructed in anticipation of the northern segment.

=== Redesignation ===
TDOT first submitted a request to the FHWA to redesignate SR 840 as I-840 in November 1991. This was withdrawn two months later after it was chosen to construct the entire route with state funds.

In 2015, TDOT submitted a request to AASHTO to redesignate SR 840 as I-840. Though the application had an error that required TDOT to refile it, AASHTO conditionally approved it and submitted it to the FHWA for their approval. The FHWA approved the change on July 22, 2015, and AASHTO finalized their approval on September 25, 2015. TDOT announced on August 12, 2016, that it would start replacing the signs to change over the designation the week of August 14 and that the project would be completed by the end of the year at a cost of $230,000 (equivalent to $302,000 in 2025).

=== Tennessee National Guard Parkway ===
In 2005, the Tennessee General Assembly passed legislation designating I-840 as the "Tennessee National Guard Parkway". Since 2007, the state has named bridges on I-840 in honor of members of the Tennessee National Guard killed in the global war on terror.

== Exit list ==
County	Location	mi	km	Exit	Destinations	Notes
Dickson		0.0	0.0	1	I-40 – Memphis, Dickson, Nashville	Western terminus; exit 176 on I-40; signed as exits 1A (west) and 1B (east)
Hickman	No major junctions					
Williamson		7.3	11.7	7	SR 100 / SR 46 – Fairview, Centerville	
Williamson		14.1	22.7	14	SR 46 (Pinewood Road) – Leiper's Fork	
Williamson	Burwood	22.9	36.9	23	SR 246 (Carters Creek Pike)	
Williamson	Thompson's Station	28.3	45.5	28	US 31 (Columbia Pike, SR 6) – Columbia, Spring Hill, Franklin	
Williamson	Thompson's Station	30.3	48.8	30	US 431 (Lewisburg Pike, SR 106) – Franklin, Lewisburg	
Williamson	Thompson's Station	31.1	50.1	31	I-65 – Nashville, Franklin, Huntsville, AL	Signed as exits 31A (south) and 31B (north); exits 59A-B on I-65
Williamson	Peytonsville	34.9	56.2	34	Peytonsville–Trinity Road	
Williamson		37.1	59.7	37	Arno Road	
Williamson	Triune	41.9	67.4	42	US 31A / US 41A (Horton Highway, SR 11) – Shelbyville, Lewisburg, Nolensville	
Rutherford	Almaville	46.9	75.5	47	SR 102 (Almaville Road) – Smyrna	
Rutherford	Blackman	50.8	81.8	50	Veterans Parkway – Blackman	
Rutherford	Murfreesboro	53.1	85.5	53	I-24 – Nashville, Chattanooga, Murfreesboro	Signed as exits 53A (east) and 53B (west) westbound; exits 74A-B on I-24
Rutherford	Murfreesboro	55.1	88.7	55	US 41 / US 70S (NW Broad Street, New Nashville Highway, SR 1) – Murfreesboro, Smyrna	Signed as exits 55A (south/east) and 55B (north/west)
Rutherford		57.8	93.0	57	Sulphur Springs Road	
Rutherford		61.4	98.8	61	SR 266 (West Jefferson Pike) – Smyrna	
Rutherford				Sergeant First Class Mark O Edwards Memorial Bridge over the Stones River		
Rutherford		65.2	104.9	65	SR 452 (Bill France Boulevard) – Nashville Superspeedway	
Wilson		67.2	108.1	67	Couchville Pike	Exit to Cedars of Lebanon State Park
Wilson	Gladeville	70.6	113.6	70	Stewarts Ferry Pike – Gladeville	
Wilson		72.0	115.9	72	SR 265 (Central Pike) to SR 109 north	Signed as exits 72A (east) and 72B (west) eastbound
Wilson	Lebanon	76.8	123.6	76	I-40 – Nashville, Knoxville, Lebanon	Eastern terminus; signed as exits 76A (east) and 76B (west); exit 235 on I-40
1.000 mi = 1.609 km; 1.000 km = 0.621 mi
