= Liberty Historic District (Liberty, Tennessee) =

Historic district in Tennessee, United States

- U.S. National Register of Historic Places
- U.S. Historic district
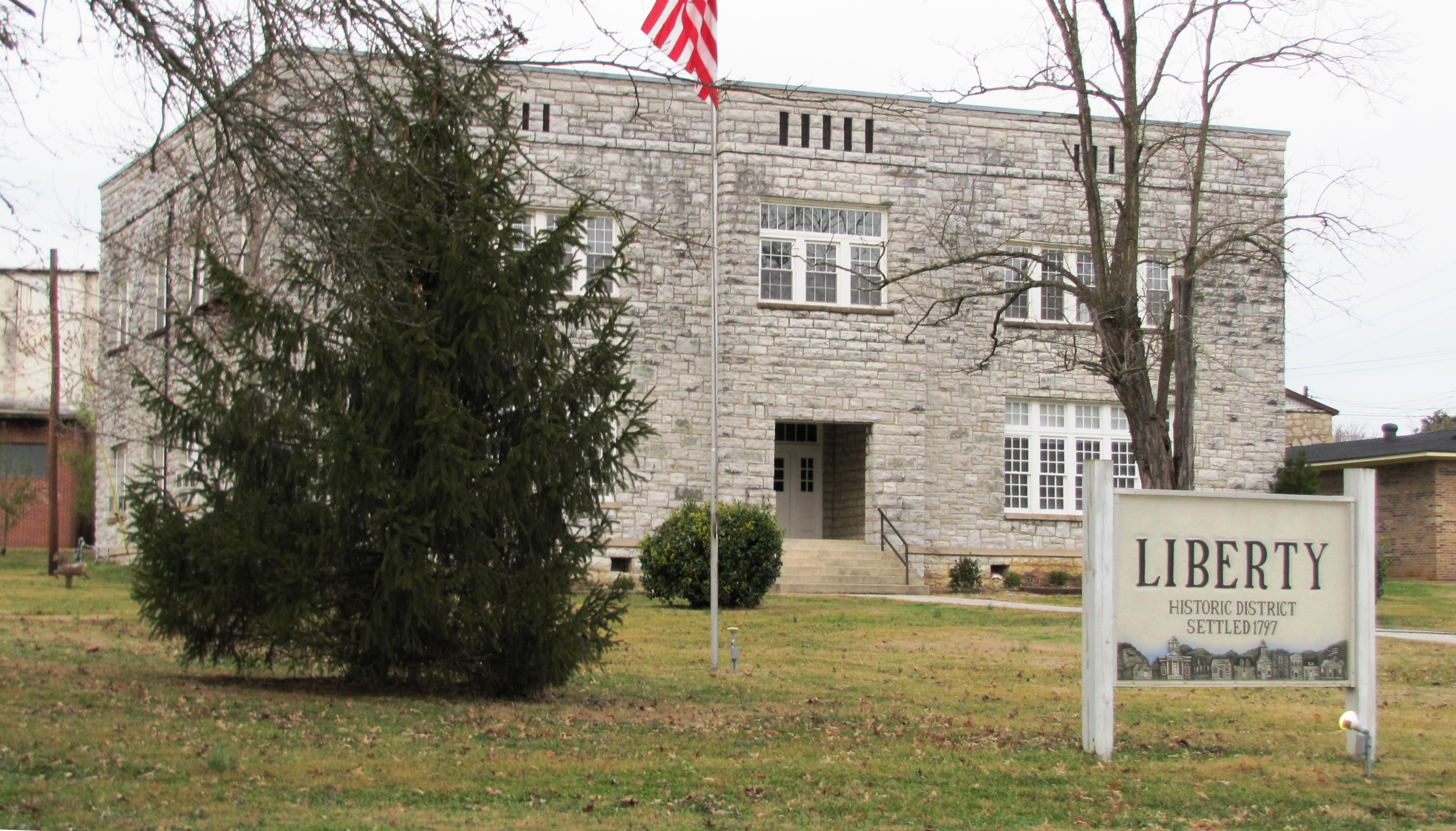
- Liberty's town hall, within the district

- Location within Tennessee Location within the United States
- Location: Roughly along Main and N. Main Sts., Liberty, Tennessee
- Coordinates: 36°0′18″N 85°57′58″W
- Area: 85 acres (34 ha)
- Architectural style: Greek Revival, Queen Anne, Gothic Revival
- NRHP reference No.: 87001058
- Added to NRHP: June 25, 1987

The Liberty Historic District is a historic district in Liberty, Tennessee, United States. Encompassing 76 contributing properties in an area of 85 acres (34 ha), it was listed on the National Register of Historic Places in 1987. Buildings in the historic district include Liberty High School, the Salem Baptist Church and cemetery, and a number of private homes.
