= Fairview, Tennessee =

- City
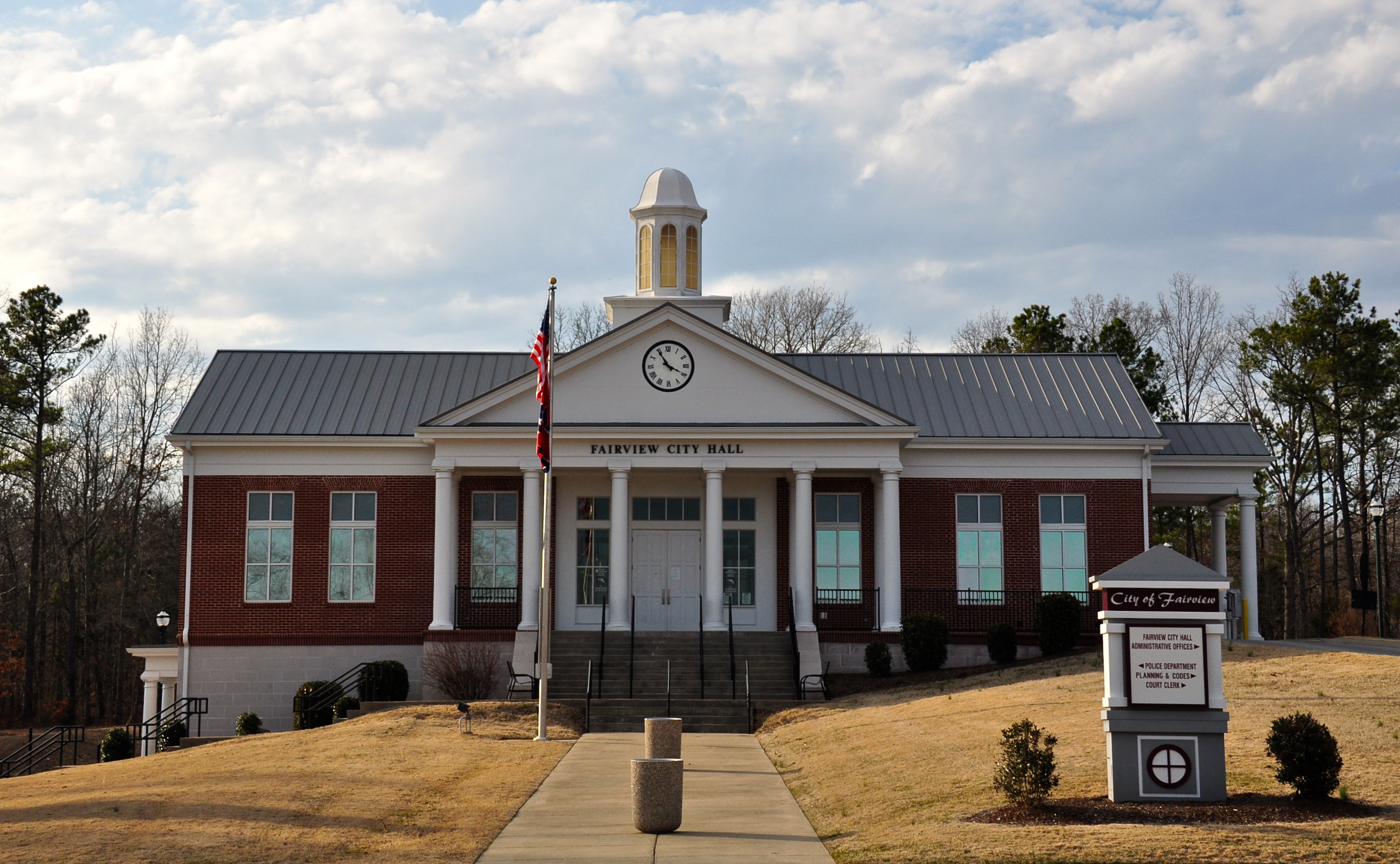
- Fairview City Hall, February 2014

- Flag Seal Logo

- Location of Fairview in Williamson County, Tennessee
- Coordinates: 35°58′55″N 87°7′45″W
- Country: United States
- State: Tennessee
- County: Williamson

Area
  - Total: 17.96 sq mi (46.51 km^{2})
  - Land: 17.93 sq mi (46.43 km^{2})
  - Water: 0.031 sq mi (0.08 km^{2})
- Elevation: 823 ft (251 m)

Population (2020)
  - Total: 9,357
  - Density: 521.9/sq mi (201.52/km^{2})
- Time zone: UTC-6 (Central (CST))
  - Summer (DST): UTC-5 (CDT)
- ZIP code: 37062
- Area code: 615/629
- FIPS code: 47-25440
- GNIS feature ID: 1303452
- Website: www.fairview-tn.org

Fairview is a city located in Williamson County, Tennessee. It is part of the Nashville metropolitan area. The population was 9,357 at the 2020 census. In the communities just outside Fairview, there are an additional 4,100 people, for a total of over 13,457 people living within the Fairview area.

== History ==
Fairview was incorporated on July 28, 1959, under the Uniform City Manager-Commission Charter as set out in the Tennessee Code Annotated. Fairview city limits are located about one mile (1.6 km) southwest from the Nashville-Davidson County line and has two interstates passing through it (I-40 & I-840). With an average elevation of 800 feet (240 m) above sea level, Fairview is about 150 feet (46 m) higher than Nashville and surrounding suburbs, which gives Fairview the advantage of being less flood prone.

It is home to Bowie Nature Park which, at approximately 722 acres (2.92 km^{2}), is one of the largest city-managed parks in the state of Tennessee. As a comparison, New York's Central Park is 843 acres (3.41 km^{2}). Fairview has two Elementary Schools, Fairview, and Westwood serving over 1,000 students with grades K-5. Fairview Middle has an enrollment of 500 plus and is home to grades 6th-8th. FVHS serves over 700 students, and Fairview High School was listed as one of the top 1,000 High Schools in the US according to Newsweek Magazine. Fairview schools are part of the Williamson County School system (www.WCS.edu).

It has a recreation center that is part of Williamson County Parks and Recreation system. The center offers civic meeting rooms, WAVES org, exercise classes, a gym with free weights and machines and a large outdoor swimming pool. There is also a full size basketball court that is open for free play.

Fairview Ball Park has been open since 1982. In the spring and early summer, the youth of Fairview play softball and baseball in the local recreation leagues. In the fall, the park is home to an adult softball league. There are four fields located at the park, Field 1 for senior league baseball, Field 2 for tee ball, and softball, Field 3 for age groups up to 12 playing baseball, and Field 4 which is primarily a softball field.

The camp scenes in Ernest Goes to Camp were filmed at Camp Marymount, which is a 340-acre retreat/summer camp owned by the Catholic Church, established in the summer of 1946.

The city is twenty-five miles from downtown Nashville, and is located along State Highway 100 in the NW section of Williamson County.

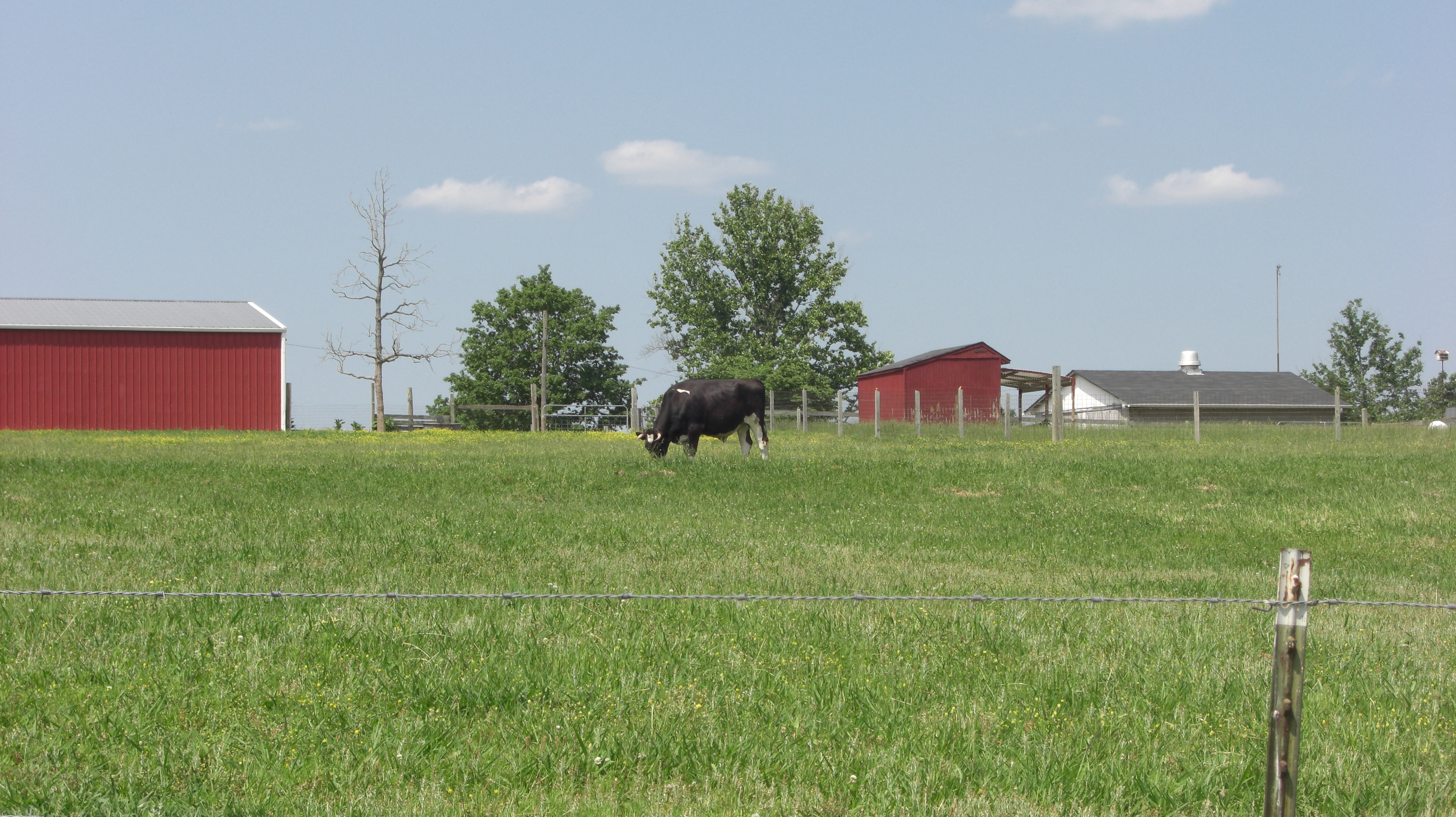
Farm in Fairview

== Geography ==
Fairview is located at 35°58′55″N 87°7′45″W (35.982071, -87.129133).

According to the United States Census Bureau, the city has a total area of 14.1 square miles (37 km^{2}), of which 14.1 square miles (37 km^{2}) is land and 0.04 square miles (0.10 km^{2}) (0.21%) is water.

== Demographics ==
Historical population
Census	Pop.	Note	%±
1960	1,017		—
1970	1,630		60.3%
1980	3,648		123.8%
1990	4,210		15.4%
2000	5,800		37.8%
2010	7,720		33.1%
2020	9,357		21.2%
2025 (est.)	10,877	▲	16.2%

=== 2020 census ===
Racial composition as of the 2020 census
Race	Number	Percent
White	8,288	88.6%
Black or African American	157	1.7%
American Indian and Alaska Native	34	0.4%
Asian	88	0.9%
Native Hawaiian and Other Pacific Islander	3	0.0%
Some other race	176	1.9%
Two or more races	611	6.5%
Hispanic or Latino (of any race)	531	5.7%

As of the 2020 census, Fairview had a population of 9,357. The median age was 37.3 years, 27.5% of residents were under the age of 18, and 12.6% of residents were 65 years of age or older. For every 100 females there were 93.0 males, and for every 100 females age 18 and over there were 87.8 males age 18 and over. There were 2,234 families residing in the city.

0.0% of residents lived in urban areas, while 100.0% lived in rural areas.

There were 3,359 households in Fairview, of which 41.9% had children under the age of 18 living in them. Of all households, 57.5% were married-couple households, 12.1% were households with a male householder and no spouse or partner present, and 24.4% were households with a female householder and no spouse or partner present. About 19.5% of all households were made up of individuals and 7.7% had someone living alone who was 65 years of age or older.

There were 3,554 housing units, of which 5.5% were vacant. The homeowner vacancy rate was 1.7% and the rental vacancy rate was 6.3%.

=== 2010 census ===
The 2010 census showed a population increase of 33.1% over the 2000 census with a population of 7,720. Racial makeup as of the 2010 census was 93.5% White, 2.8% Latino and 1.1% African American. Median household income in 2010 was $46,088.

=== 2000 census ===
As of the census of 2000, there was a population of 5,800, with 2,105 households and 1,606 families residing in the city. The population density was 410.9 inhabitants per square mile (158.6/km^{2}). There were 2,245 housing units at an average density of 159.1 units per square mile (61.4 units/km^{2}). The racial makeup of the city was 97.07% White, 0.66% African American, 0.38% Native American, 0.24% Asian, 0.33% from other races, and 1.33% from two or more races. Hispanic or Latino of any race were 1.48% of the population.

There were 2,105 households, out of which 43.7% had children under the age of 18 living with them, 61.0% were married couples living together, 11.9% had a female householder with no husband present, and 23.7% were non-families. 18.8% of all households were made up of individuals, and 6.2% had someone living alone who was 65 years of age or older. The average household size was 2.76 and the average family size was 3.17.

In the city, the population was spread out, with 30.3% under the age of 18, 8.6% from 18 to 24, 34.1% from 25 to 44, 19.7% from 45 to 64, and 7.3% who were 65 years of age or older. The median age was 32 years. For every 100 females, there were 93.3 males. For every 100 females age 18 and over, there were 89.5 males.

The median income for a household in the city was $44,148, and the median income for a family was $49,817. Males had a median income of $36,461 versus $26,277 for females. The per capita income for the city was $20,403. About 5.6% of families and 8.1% of the population were below the poverty line, including 10.2% of those under age 18 and 12.3% of those age 65 or over.

== Transportation ==
Tennessee State Route 100 and Tennessee State Route 96 give Fairview direct access to Interstate 40 and Interstate 840.
