= Nathaniel Smithson House =

Historic house in Tennessee, United States

- U.S. National Register of Historic Places
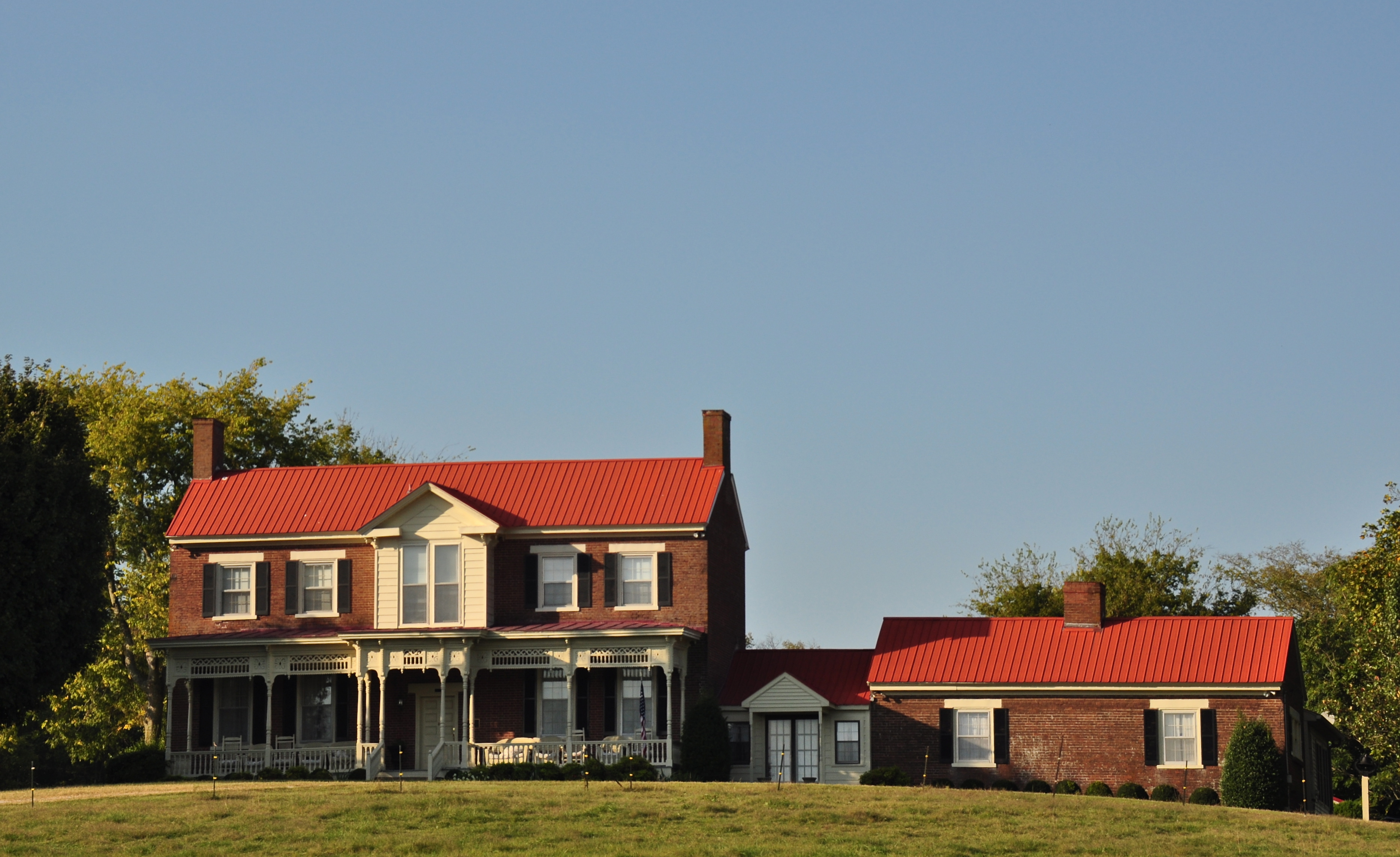
- Nathaniel Smithson House, September 2014.

- Location within Tennessee Location within the United States
- Location: Peytonsville-Bethesda Rd., Peytonsville, Tennessee
- Coordinates: 35.81834°N 86.777°W
- Area: 3.2 acres (1.3 ha)
- Built: c. 1840 and c. 1880
- Architectural style: Italianate, Central passage plan
- MPS: Williamson County MRA
- NRHP reference No.: 88000353
- Added to NRHP: April 13, 1988

The Nathaniel Smithson House is a property in Peytonsville, Tennessee, which was listed on the National Register of Historic Places in 1988.

The house is a two-story brick central passage plan house, built c. 1840. The front facade has brick is laid in Flemish bond and a one-story Italianate-style porch added in c. 1880. Brick elsewhere is laid in five course common bond.

When listed the property included two contributing buildings and one non-contributing building on an area of 3.2 acres (1.3 ha). A one-story frame smokehouse built c. 1880, behind the main house, is the second contributing building. A one-story c.1900 frame building which served as a store elsewhere was moved to the property later was deemed non-contributing.

The NRHP eligibility of the property was covered in a 1988 study of Williamson County historical resources.
