= Gentry, Tennessee =

Coordinates: 36.181°N 85.745°W

Gentry is an unincorporated community on a high ridge in far western Putnam County, Tennessee, split between the 38544 and 38548 ZIP codes. It is located where U.S. Route 70N (Nashville Highway) meets Little Indian Creek Road and Stanton Road, the latter of which leads south to nearby Buffalo Valley. The Middle Tennessee Dragway is located in the nearby valley of the Rock Springs Branch; the creek is so named because of the two large rocks confining the headwaters behind the Pleasant Grove Church. In addition to the church, the drag racing track and some houses, the community also has a decommissioned school that now serves as a community center.
