= Granville, Tennessee =

- Unincorporated community
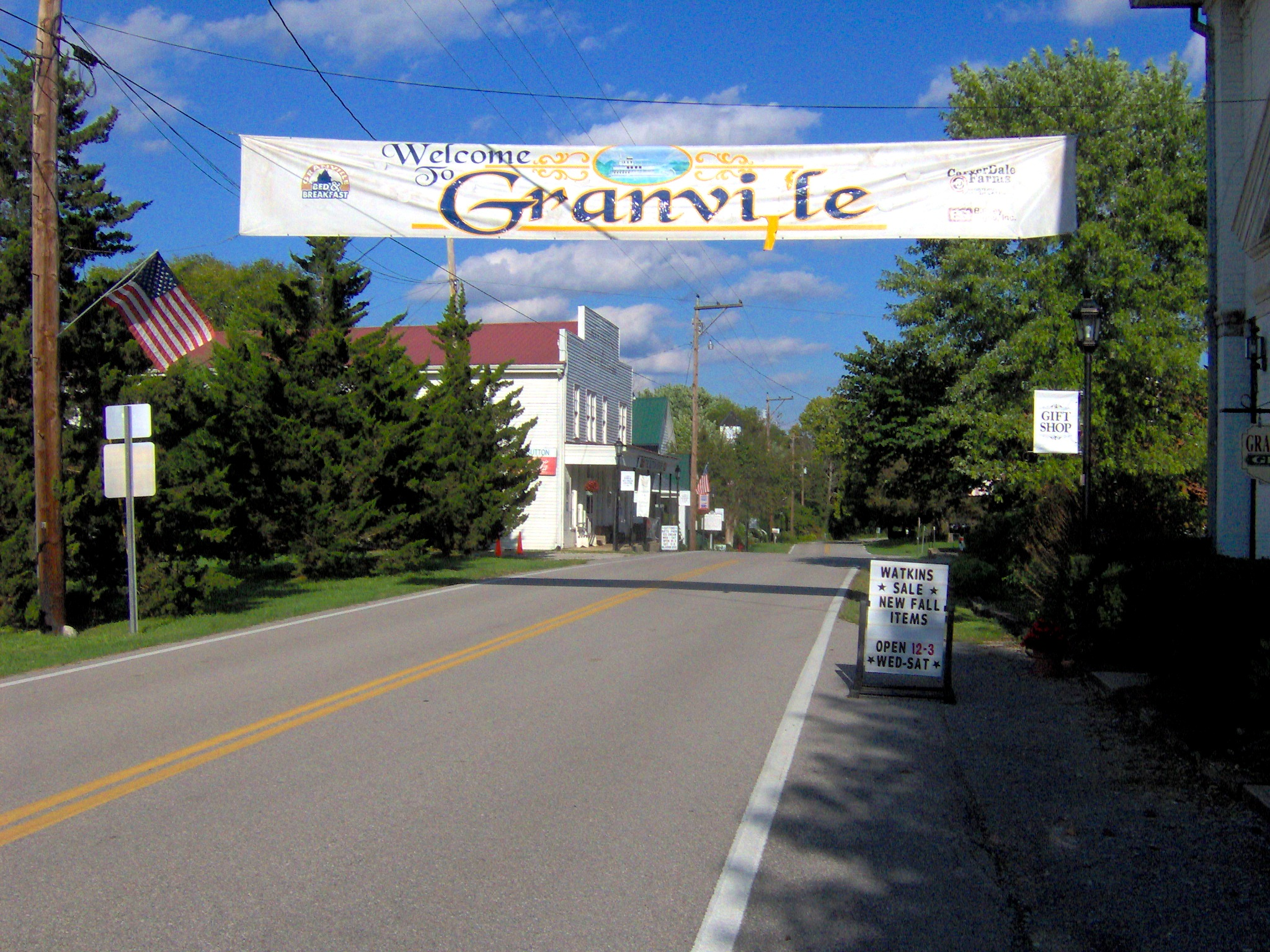
- Clover Street (State Route 96) in Granville

- Location within Tennessee Location within the United States
- Coordinates: 36.271°N 85.795°W
- Country: United States
- State: Tennessee
- County: Jackson
- Elevation: 524 ft (160 m)
- Time zone: UTC-6 (Central (CST))
  - Summer (DST): UTC-5 (CDT)
- ZIP code: 38564
- Area code: 931

Granville is an unincorporated community in Jackson County, Tennessee, United States. Granville was the birthplace of U.S. Senator Albert Gore Sr., the father of former vice president Al Gore.

Granville is surrounded by the Cordell Hull Lake on three sides. When the Cordell Hull Dam was constructed in the early 1970s, much of the town's farmland was destroyed, resulting in the town becoming a "ghost town."

A museum of local history, the Granville Museum, provides exhibits and interpretive displays on the community's past. The museum also sponsors festivals and other special events. The museum's resources document the lives of numerous families active in the years before and during World War I. Resources include census records and the Sutton Store's ledgers.

The Granville community plays host to three major annual festivals. Heritage Day is held the Saturday before Memorial Day, and features attractions such as bluegrass, antique cars, and living history demonstrations. The first Saturday in October is Granville's scarecrow festival. This festival is regarded as the largest scarecrow festival in the state of Tennessee. A quilt show is held in conjunction with this festival. On the second Saturday of December, Granville hosts their Country Christmas festival. This festival features an antique toy show, and a Christmas parade. All three festivals involve the town, and its historic buildings.

The historic T.B. Sutton General Store plays host to bluegrass music every Saturday night year round.

Granville is home to two National Register of Historic Places sites. Carverdale Farms (#100002754) was added to the National Register on July 31, 2018. The farm is one of the oldest settlements in Jackson County and also one of the oldest continuously operating farms in Tennessee. First settled in 1830 by Joseph Williamson and family. Samuel Sampson Carver purchased property in 1890, operating a saw mill, blacksmith shop, and general store in addition to operating this farm. The farm was used for maneuver training during World War II. On October 24, 1955 current owner and great grandson of Carver, Joe Moore was featured on the cover of Time magazine after being named 1955 Star Farmer of America.

Granville, Tennessee's T.B. Sutton General Store (#100003902) was officially listed in the National Register of Historic Places on May 7, 2019. Constructed in 1880, Sutton Store is the oldest remaining commercial institution in Granville. The store sat empty for approximately thirty years before Harold and Beverley Sutton (no relation to T.B. Sutton) purchased and restored the building. In 2007, they donated the building to Historic Granville Incorporated who continue to operate the building as a general store, restaurant, and music venue. Sutton Store has been recently recognized by Country Living and Taste of the South magazines as one of the must see general stores in America.

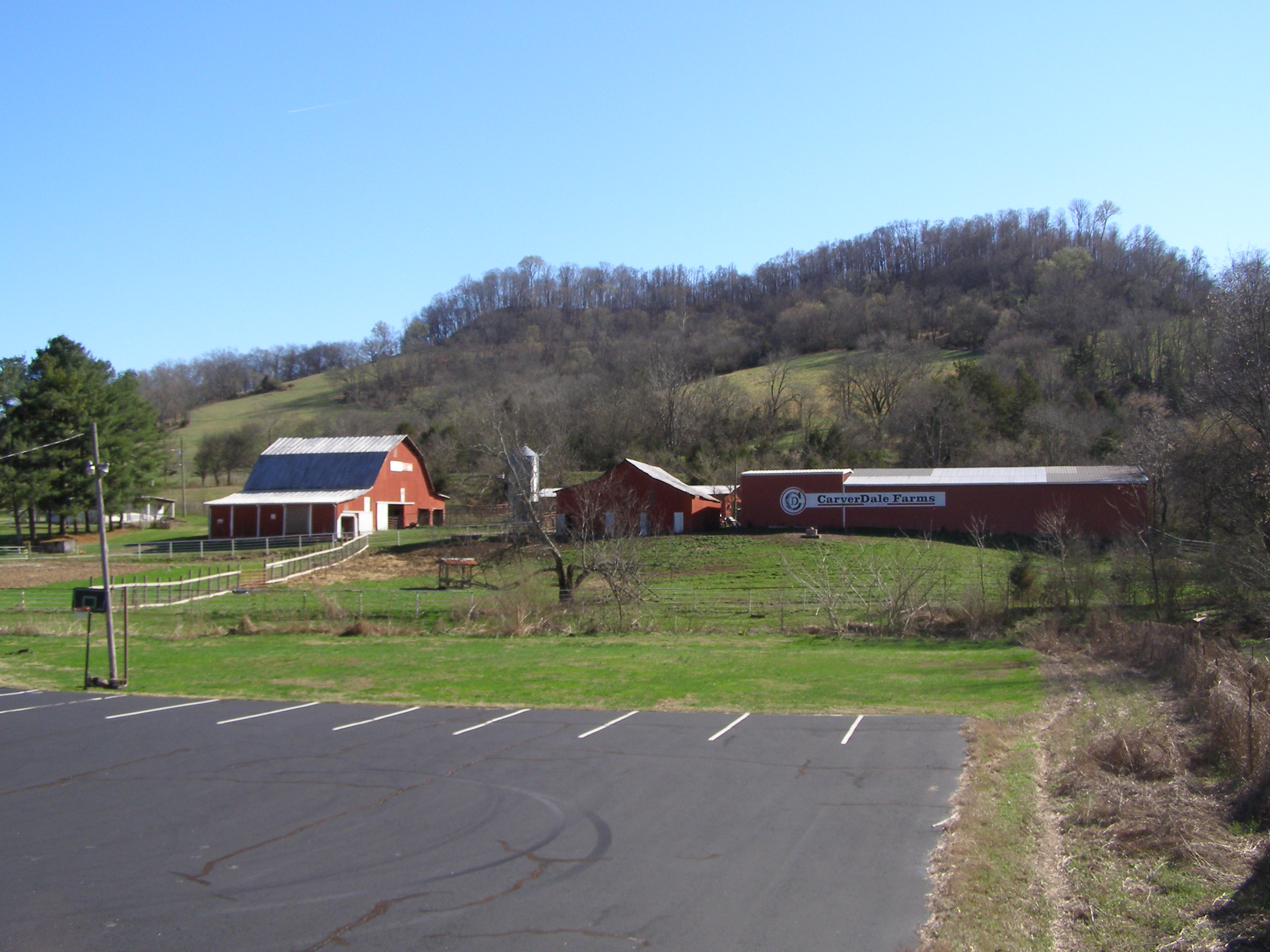
Carverdale Farms

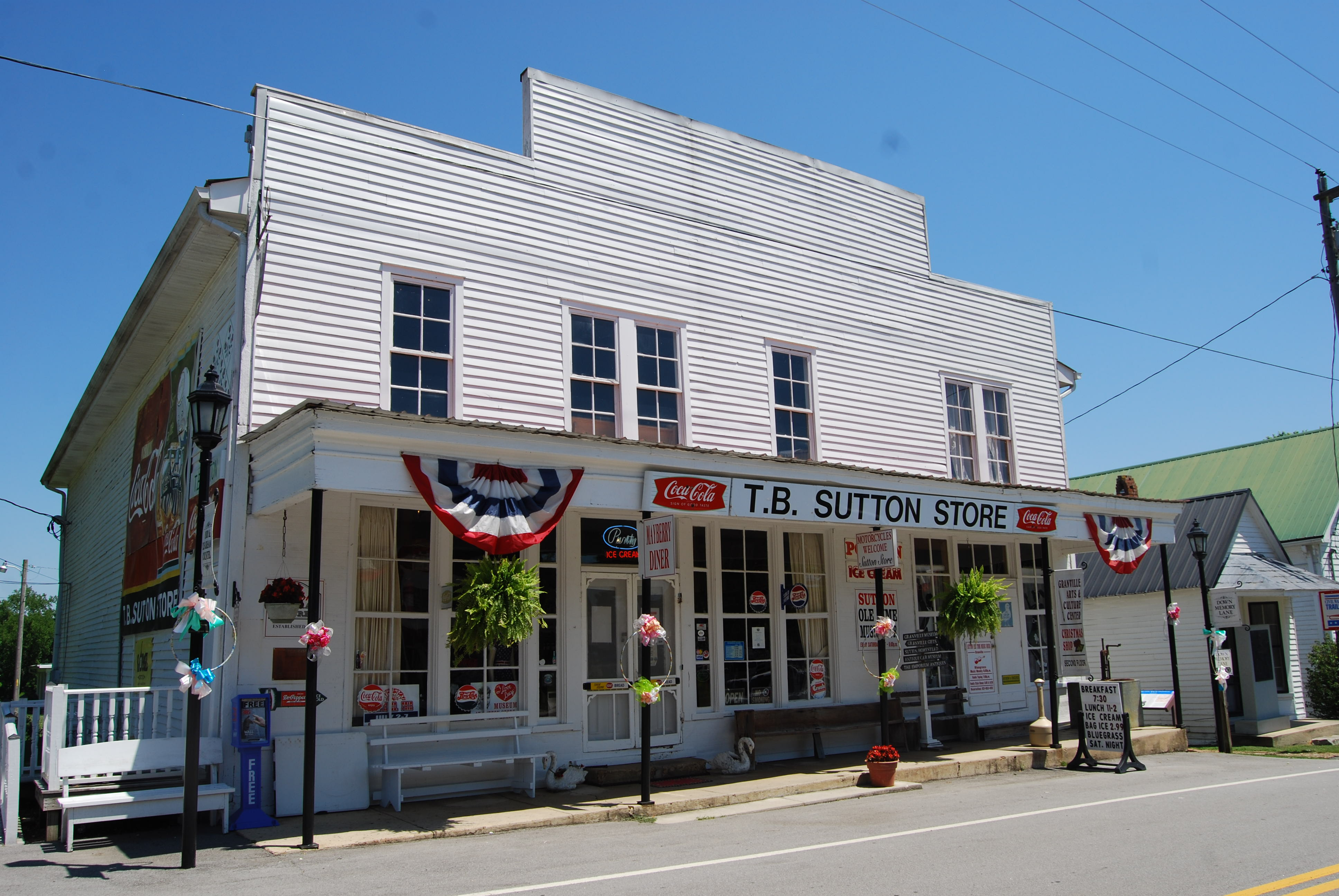

State Route 53 (Granville Highway) and State Route 96 (Clover Street) intersect in Granville.

== Climate ==
Granville's climate is four-season subtropical (Köppen Cfa, Trewartha Cf), typical of Tennessee. Granville lies in USDA Hardiness Zone 7a, so the coldest night of the year typically drops to 0 to 5 degrees Fahrenheit (-18 to -15 degrees Celsius).

Climate data for Granville
Month	Jan	Feb	Mar	Apr	May	Jun	Jul	Aug	Sep	Oct	Nov	Dec	Year
Mean daily maximum °F (°C)	46.6 (8.1)	51.5 (10.8)	60.9 (16.1)	70.4 (21.3)	78.2 (25.7)	85.9 (29.9)	89.2 (31.8)	88.5 (31.4)	82.4 (28.0)	71.8 (22.1)	61.6 (16.4)	49.7 (9.8)	69.7 (20.9)
Daily mean °F (°C)	36.90 (2.72)	40.70 (4.83)	48.80 (9.33)	57.65 (14.25)	66.40 (19.11)	74.90 (23.83)	78.50 (25.83)	77.50 (25.28)	70.75 (21.53)	59.55 (15.31)	50.20 (10.11)	39.90 (4.39)	58.45 (14.69)
Mean daily minimum °F (°C)	27.2 (−2.7)	29.9 (−1.2)	36.7 (2.6)	44.9 (7.2)	54.6 (12.6)	63.9 (17.7)	67.8 (19.9)	66.5 (19.2)	59.1 (15.1)	47.3 (8.5)	38.8 (3.8)	30.1 (−1.1)	47.2 (8.4)
Average precipitation inches (mm)	4.5 (110)	4.5 (110)	4.7 (120)	4.2 (110)	5.4 (140)	4.6 (120)	5.0 (130)	3.9 (99)	3.7 (94)	3.4 (86)	4.5 (110)	5.4 (140)	53.8 (1,369)
Average snowfall inches (cm)	2.1 (5.3)	1.3 (3.3)	0.4 (1.0)	0 (0)	0 (0)	0 (0)	0 (0)	0 (0)	0 (0)	0 (0)	0 (0)	0.5 (1.3)	4.3 (10.9)
Source: "Climate in Granville, Tennessee". BestPlaces. BestPlaces.
