= Norene, Tennessee =

- Unincorporated community
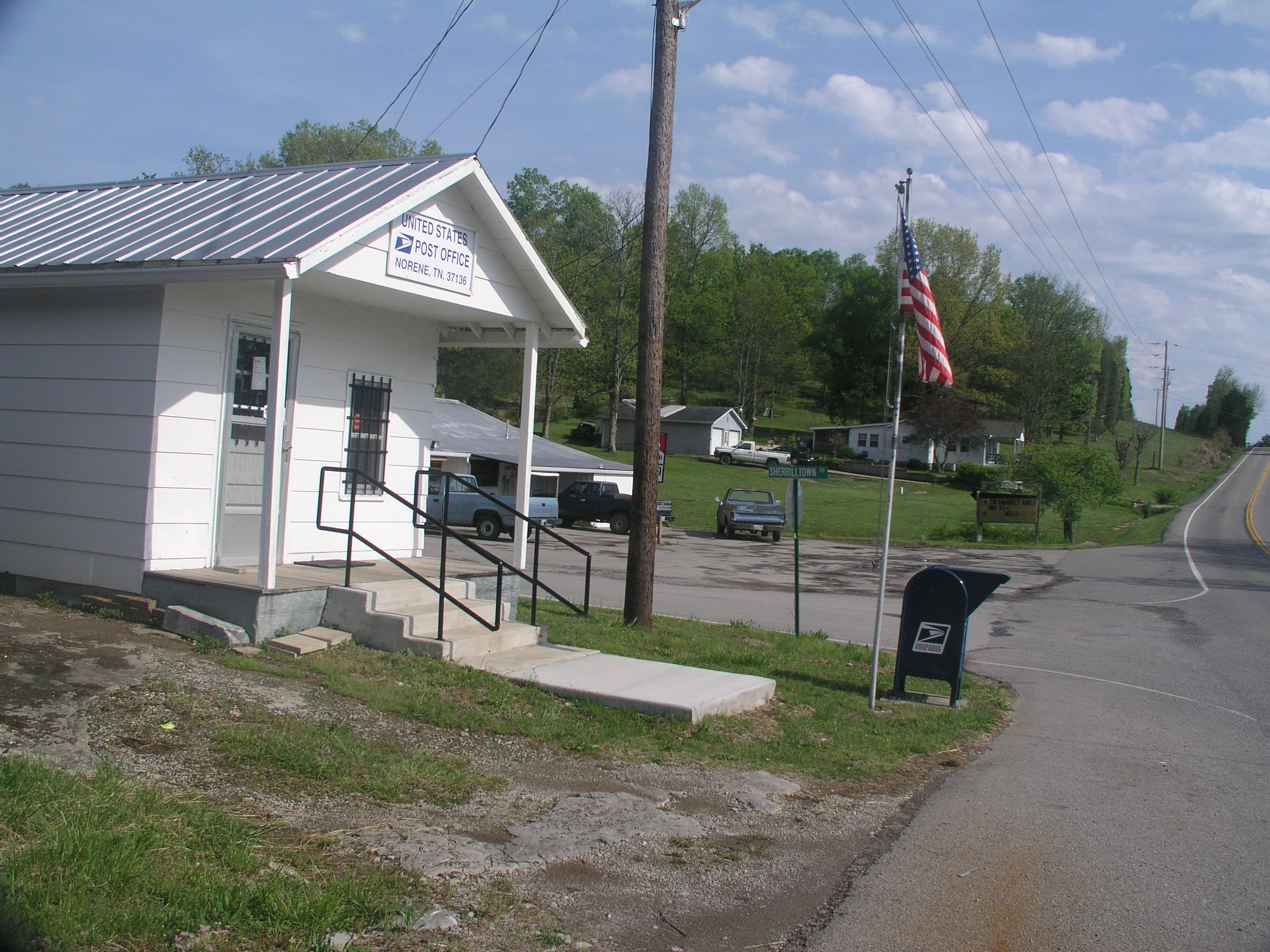
- Norene as seen from State Route 266
- Interactive map of Norene, Tennessee
- Coordinates: 36°03′24″N 86°14′33″W
- Country: United States
- State: Tennessee
- County: Wilson

Area
  - Total: 1.71 sq mi (4.43 km^{2})
  - Land: 1.71 sq mi (4.43 km^{2})
  - Water: 0 sq mi (0.00 km^{2})
- Elevation: 741 ft (226 m)

Population (2020)
  - Total: 148
  - Density: 86.6/sq mi (33.42/km^{2})
- Time zone: UTC-6 (Central (CST))
  - Summer (DST): UTC-5 (CDT)
- ZIP code: 37136
- Area code: 615
- GNIS feature ID: 1304185

Norene is an unincorporated community in Wilson County, in the U.S. state of Tennessee. It is located along Tennessee State Route 266. The community has a general store, post office and churches.

== Demographics ==
Historical population
Census	Pop.	Note	%±
2020	148		—
U.S. Decennial Census

== History ==
The community was once called "Henderson's Cross Roads" by the local post office upon establishment in 1878. The community's name was officially changed to Norene on February 17, 1915. By 1916 it was one of the eight largest villages in Wilson County with residents numbering 100. By 1930 the population had increased to 120.

== Education ==
Norene is served by Wilson County Schools. Its zoned schools are Watertown Elementary School, Watertown Middle School, and Watertown High School.

== Photo gallery ==
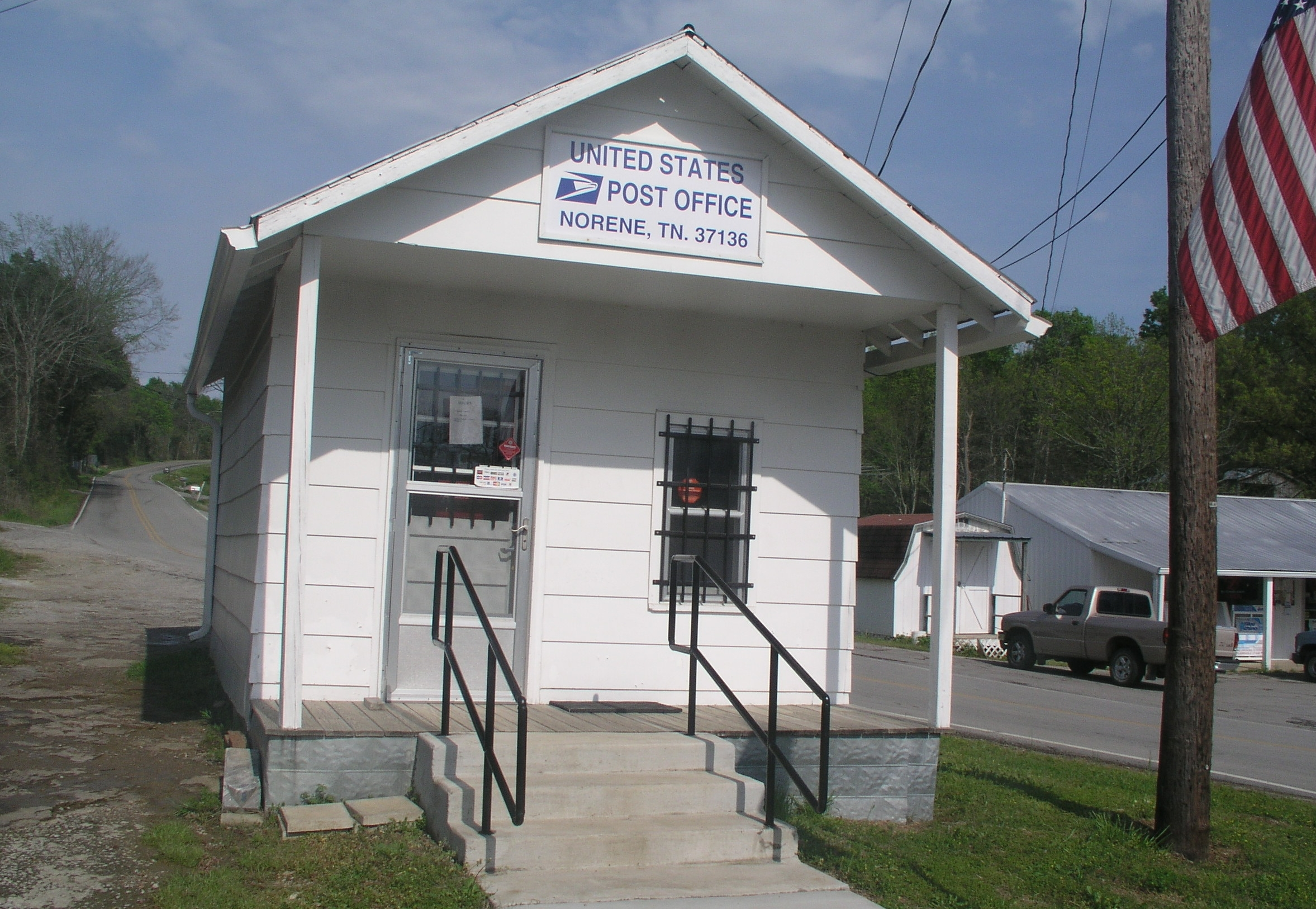
Norene Post Office

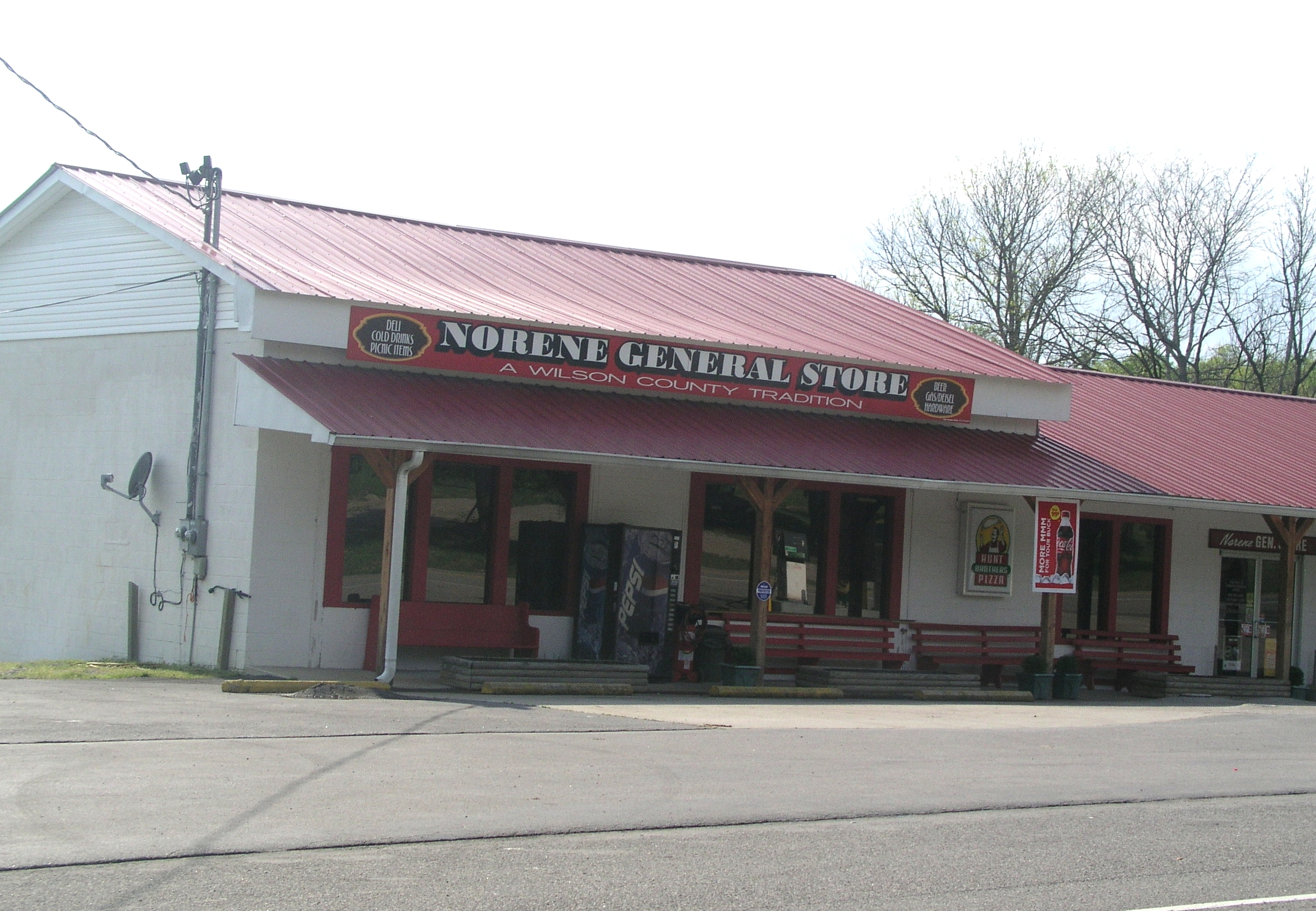
Norene General Store
