= Statesville, Tennessee =

- Unincorporated community
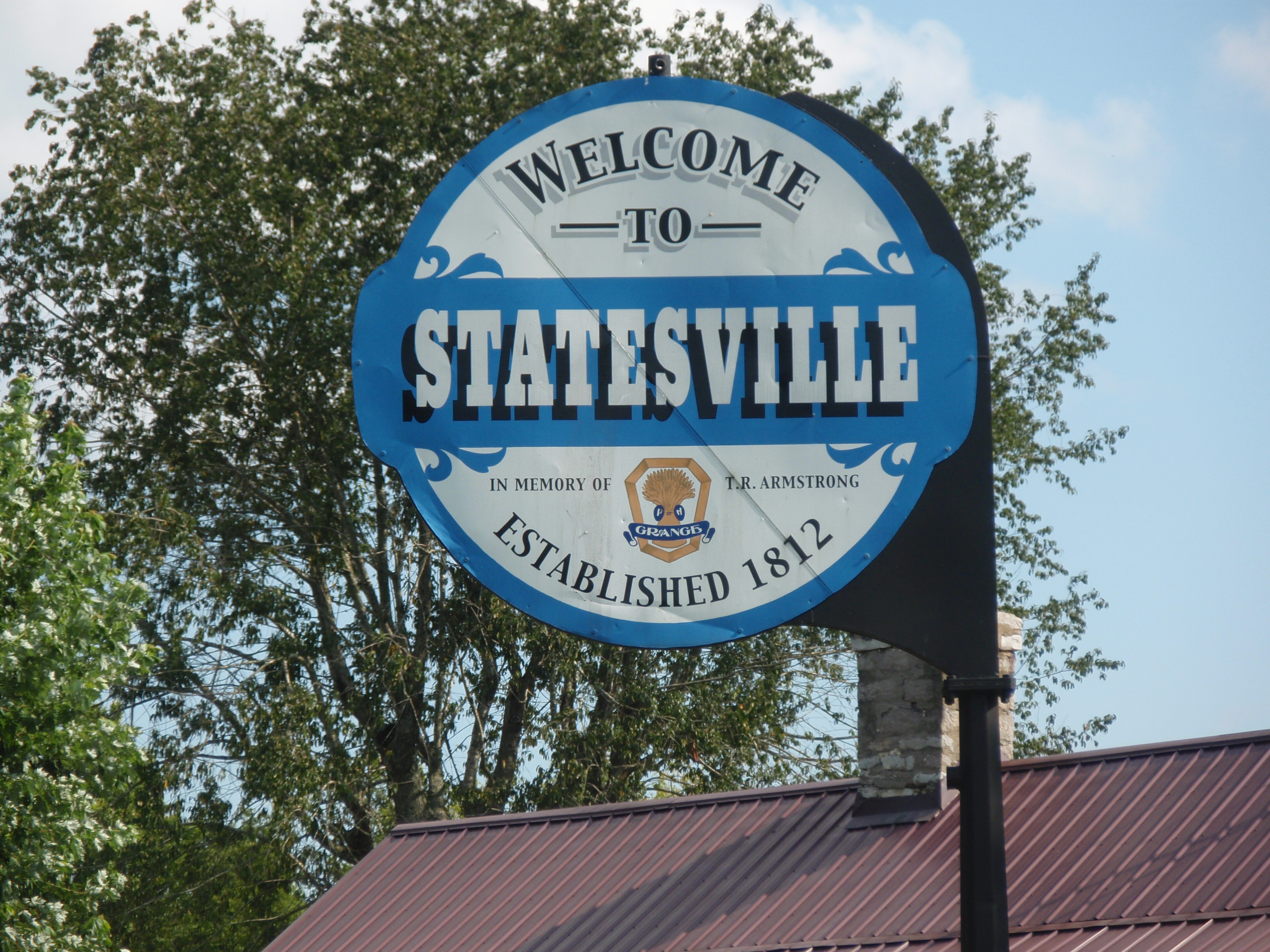

- Coordinates: 36°01′10″N 86°07′30″W
- Country: United States
- State: Tennessee
- County: Wilson

Area
  - Total: 0.88 sq mi (2.27 km^{2})
  - Land: 0.88 sq mi (2.27 km^{2})
  - Water: 0 sq mi (0.00 km^{2})
- Elevation: 720 ft (220 m)

Population (2020)
  - Total: 82
  - Density: 93.4/sq mi (36.05/km^{2})
- Time zone: UTC-6 (Central (CST))
  - Summer (DST): UTC-5 (CDT)
- ZIP code: 37184
- Area code: 615
- GNIS feature ID: 1303808

Statesville is an unincorporated community in Wilson County, Tennessee. It is located along Tennessee State Route 267 (Statesville Road) near Watertown.

== Demographics ==
Historical population
Census	Pop.	Note	%±
2020	82		—
U.S. Decennial Census

== History ==
The community was first called Smith's Fork and was officially established in 1812, making it the second oldest town in Wilson County. Local resident William Bumpass donated land to be divided into 19 town lots. The community was originally named Marysville in honor of Mary Bumpass, William's wife. In 1818 the community applied for a post office. To avoid confusion with Maryville in east Tennessee, the town's name was changed to Statesville, chosen in honor of Statesville, North Carolina, as many residents had come from that location.

The post office was established on March 29, 1819, and was twice discontinued before closing in 1935. The town became prominent in 1834 when one-fourth of the state's cotton mills were located there. During that time there were seven stores, five saloons, a wood shop, three blacksmith shops, and three harness, boot, and shoe shops.

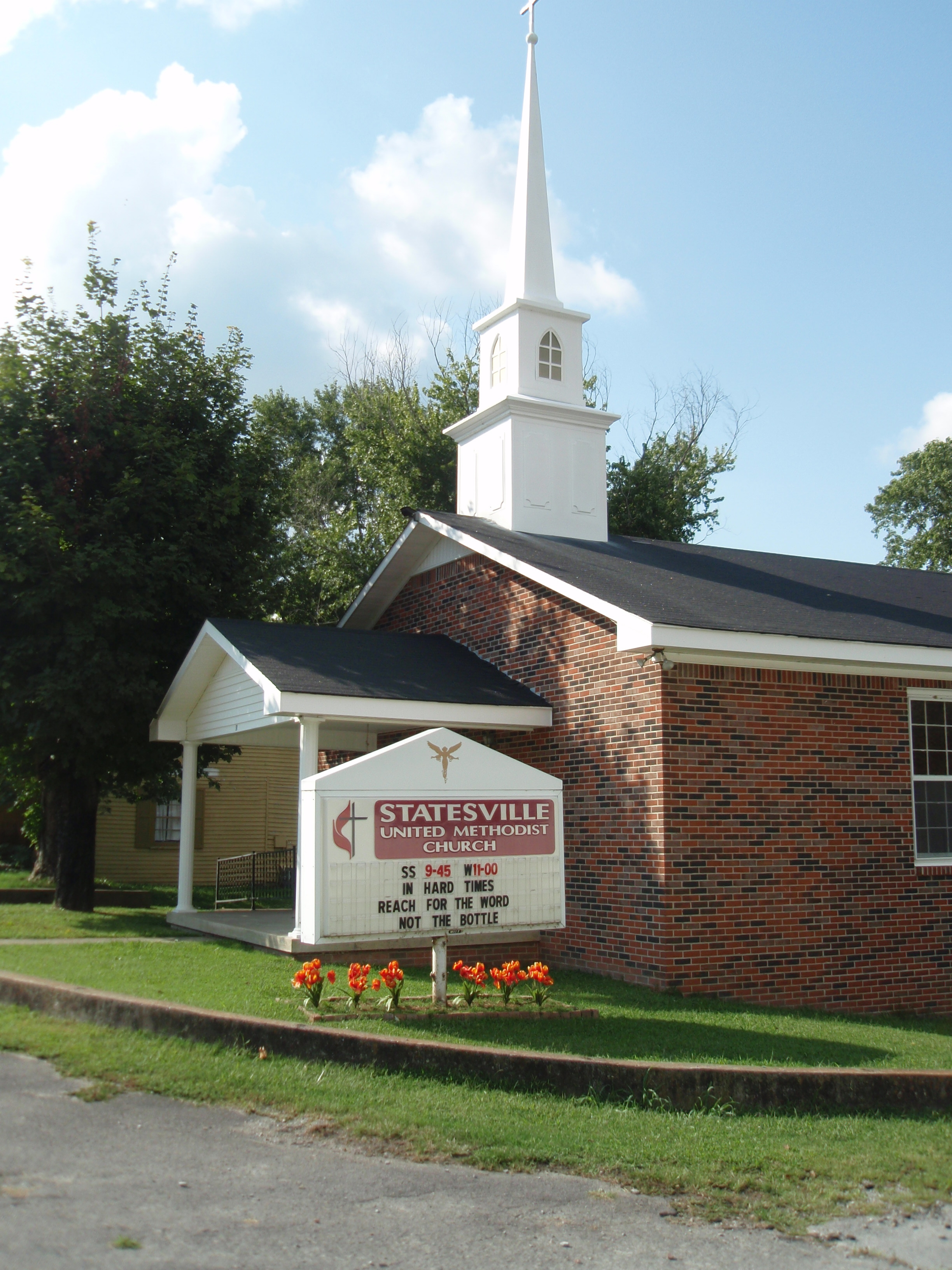
Statesville United Methodist Church

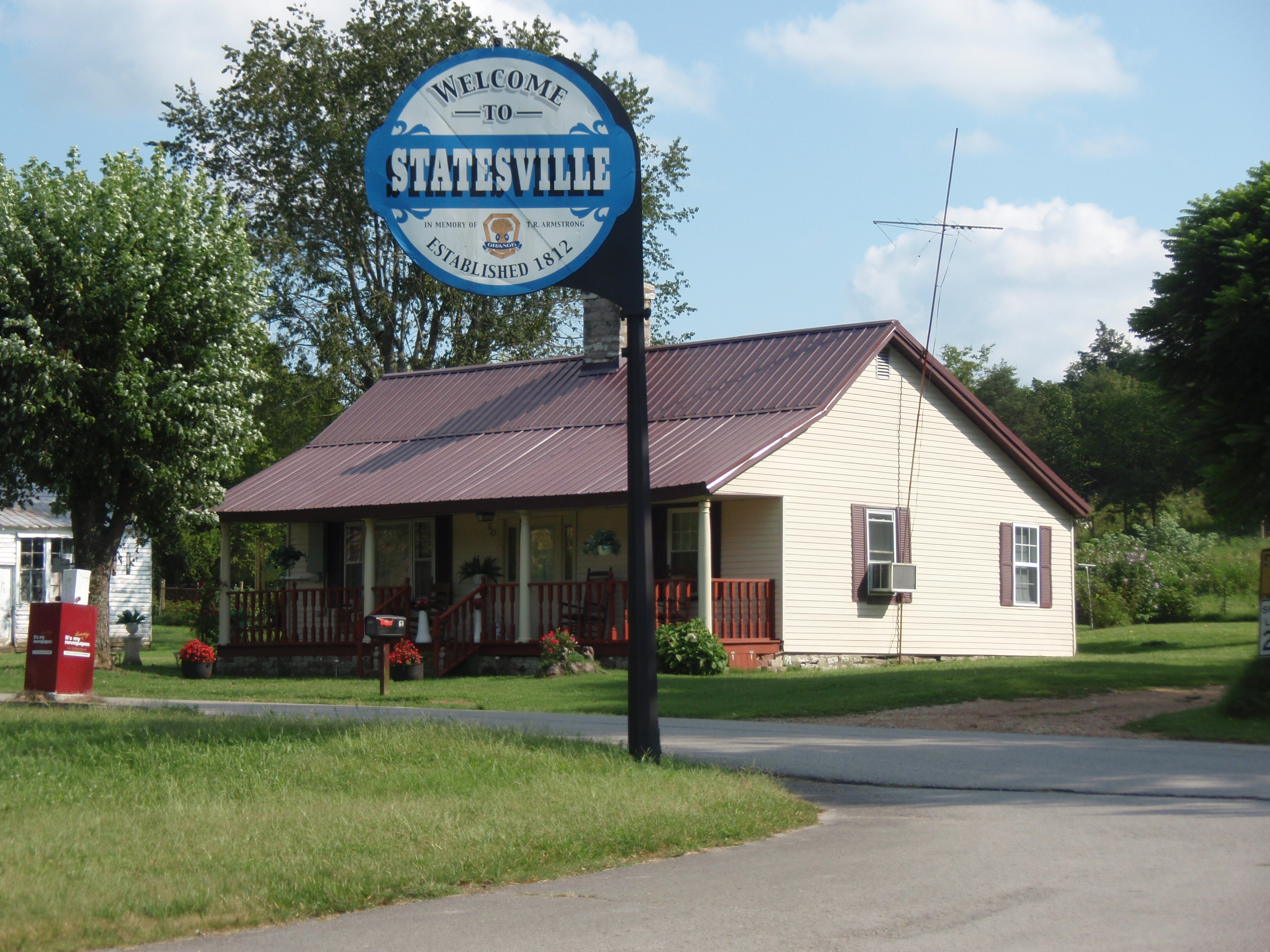
Street in Statesville

== Education ==
Statesville is served by Wilson County Schools. Its zoned schools are Watertown Elementary School, Watertown Middle School, and Watertown High School.
