= Almaville, Tennessee =

Unincorporated community in Tennessee, US

Coordinates: 35°51′55″N 86°34′52″W

Almaville is a town in Rutherford County, Tennessee, in the United States.

== History ==
A post office called Almaville was established in 1879, and remained in operation until it was discontinued in 1905. According to tradition, the first postmaster selected the name to honor Alma, a young lady in the neighborhood.
