= Auburntown, Tennessee =

- Town
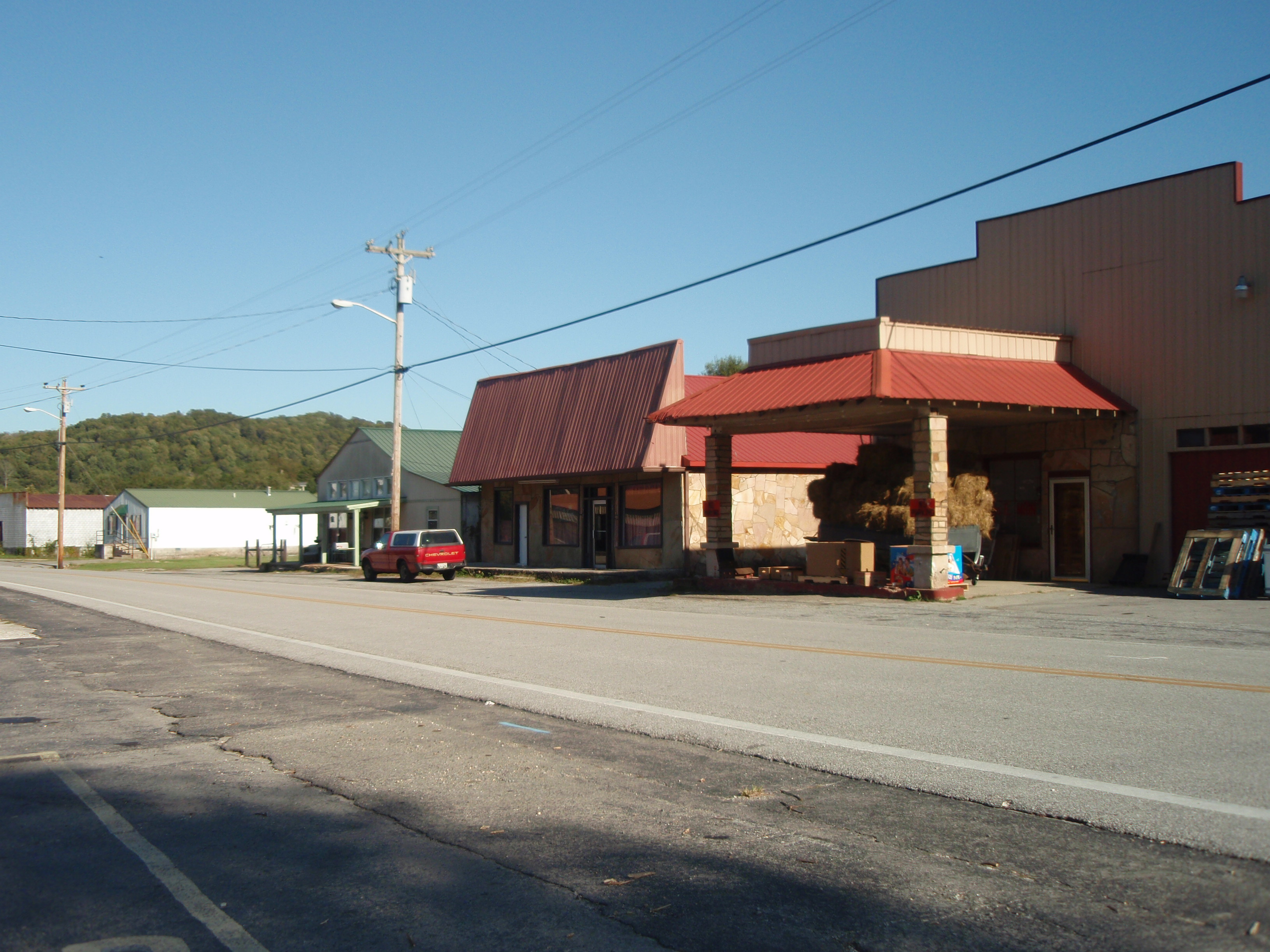
- Stores in Auburntown

- Location of Auburntown in Cannon County, Tennessee.
- Coordinates: 35°56′59″N 86°5′45″W
- Country: United States
- State: Tennessee
- County: Cannon
- Incorporated: 1949

Area
  - Total: 0.58 sq mi (1.50 km^{2})
  - Land: 0.58 sq mi (1.50 km^{2})
  - Water: 0 sq mi (0.00 km^{2})
- Elevation: 715 ft (218 m)

Population (2020)
  - Total: 272
  - Density: 470.7/sq mi (181.73/km^{2})
- Time zone: UTC-6 (Central (CST))
  - Summer (DST): UTC-5 (CDT)
- ZIP code: 37016
- Area code: 615
- FIPS code: 47-02400
- GNIS feature ID: 1304896

Auburntown is a town in Cannon County, Tennessee, United States. The population was 272 as of the 2020 census, up from 269 at the 2010 census.

== History ==
Once known as Poplar Stand, due to large population of poplar trees in the area, Auburntown was eventually renamed after Auburn, New York. It was incorporated in 1949.

== Geography ==
Auburntown is located at 35°56′59″N 86°05′45″W.

According to the United States Census Bureau, the town has a total area of 0.6 square miles (1.6 km^{2}), all of it land.

== Demographics ==
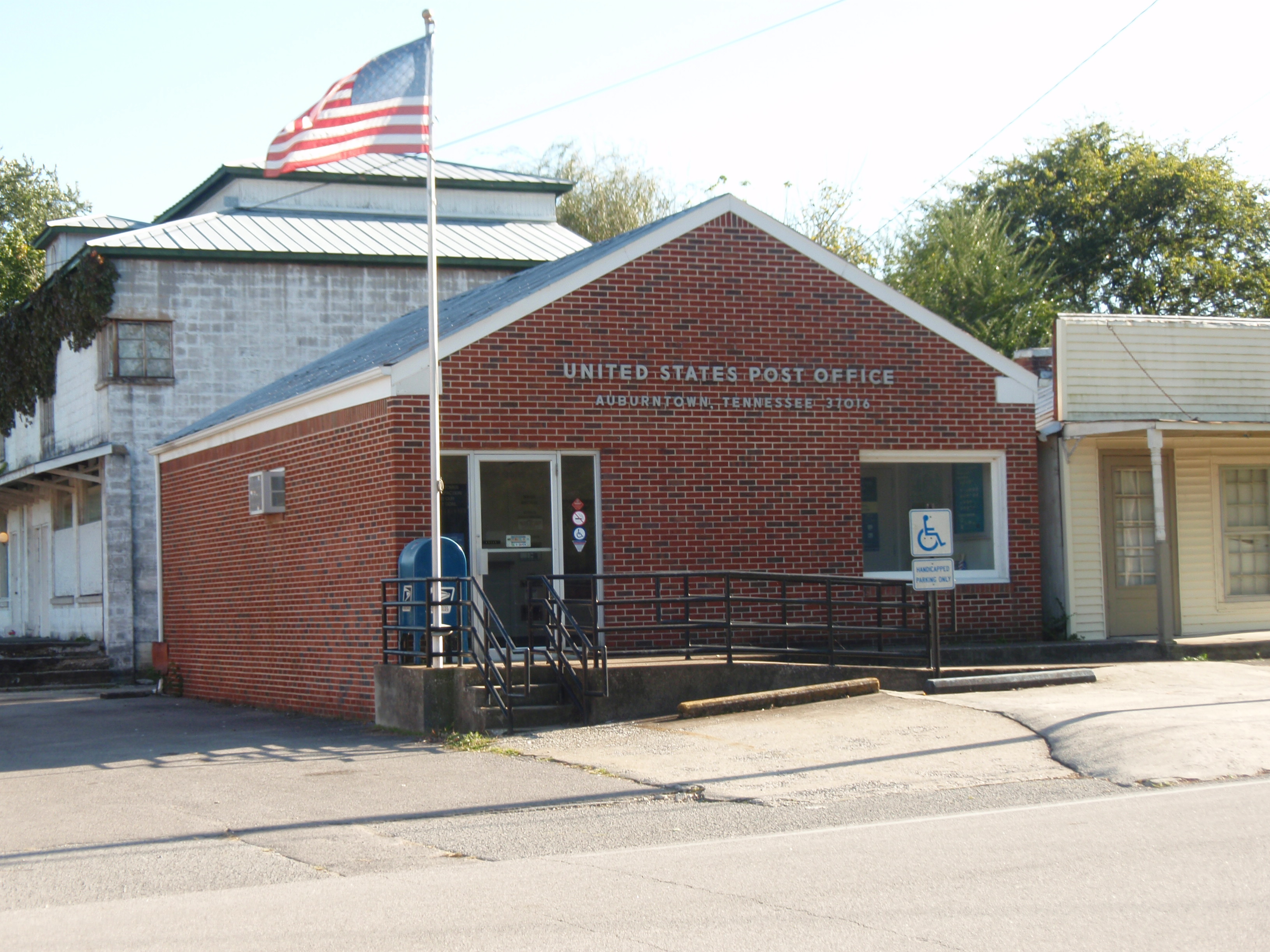
Post office in Auburntown

Historical population
Census	Pop.	Note	%±
1880	107		—
1950	273		—
1960	256		−6.2%
1970	213		−16.8%
1980	204		−4.2%
1990	240		17.6%
2000	252		5.0%
2010	269		6.7%
2020	272		1.1%

=== 2020 census ===
Auburntown racial composition
Race	Number	Percentage
White (non-Hispanic)	252	92.65%
Asian	2	0.74%
Other/Mixed	13	4.78%
Hispanic or Latino	5	1.84%

As of the 2020 United States census, there were 272 people, 87 households, and 61 families residing in the town.

=== 2000 census ===
As of the census of 2000, there were 252 people, 102 households, and 74 families residing in the town. The population density was 445.8 inhabitants per square mile (172.1/km^{2}). There were 115 housing units at an average density of 203.4 per square mile (78.5/km^{2}). The racial makeup of the town was 98.41% White, 0.40% African American, 0.40% Asian, and 0.79% from two or more races.

There were 102 households, out of which 34.3% had children under the age of 18 living with them, 64.7% were married couples living together, 5.9% had a female householder with no husband present, and 26.5% were non-families. 26.5% of all households were made up of individuals, and 10.8% had someone living alone who was 65 years of age or older. The average household size was 2.47 and the average family size was 2.96.

In the town, the population was spread out, with 25.0% under the age of 18, 5.6% from 18 to 24, 28.2% from 25 to 44, 25.8% from 45 to 64, and 15.5% who were 65 years of age or older. The median age was 38 years. For every 100 females, there were 85.3 males. For every 100 females age 18 and over, there were 81.7 males.

The median income for a household in the town was $32,857, and the median income for a family was $38,750. Males had a median income of $31,429 versus $26,250 for females. The per capita income for the town was $17,275. About 8.1% of families and 11.0% of the population were below the poverty line, including 12.0% of those under the age of eighteen and 9.8% of those 65 or over.
