= Tennessee House of Representatives 57th district =

State legislative district in Tennessee

Tennessee's 57th State House of Representatives district
- Map of Tennessee House districts with the 57th District shaded in red
Representative
Susan Lynn; R–Mt. Juliet
since 2013
- Demographics: 80% White; 6.7% Black; 5.4% Hispanic; 3% Asian; 3.6% Multiracial
- Population (2024): 79,576

The Tennessee House of Representatives 57th district is one of the 99 legislative districts in the lower house of the Tennessee General Assembly. The district is located in Middle Tennessee and covers western Wilson County. The district includes Mt. Juliet, western Lebanon and surrounding unincorporated areas. Said areas include Green Hill, Rural Hill, Suggs Creek, and Gladeville. Much of the northern border of the district is formed by Old Hickory Lake and the Cumberland River. Susan Lynn has represented the district since 2013.

== Demographics ==
The Tennessee Comptroller estimates the population as of 2024 at 79,576.

- 80% of the district is White
- 6.7% of the district is Black
- 5.4% of the district is Hispanic
- 3% of the district is Asian
- 3.6% of the district is Two or more races

Detailed demographic information is also available through Census Reporter.

== History ==
The 88th Tennessee General Assembly was the first in which all districts were numbered. At that time, the 57th district was part of Davidson County. From the 99th-101st GAs, it was in Wilson County. At the 102nd GA, it was composed of parts of Marshall, Rutherford and Wilson counties. From the 103rd-107th GAs, it was composed of parts of Sumner and Wilson counties. Since the 108th General Assembly, it has been part of Wilson County.

== List of Representatives ==
Representative	Party	Years of Service	General Assembly	Hometown
Susan Lynn	Republican	2013-present	108th-114th	Mt. Juliet
Linda Elam	Republican	2011-2012	107th	Mt. Juliet
Susan Lynn	Republican	2003-2010	103rd-106th	Mt. Juliet
Mae Beavers	Republican	1995-2002	99th-102nd	Mt. Juliet
John Chiles	Republican	1977-1994	90th-98th	Nashville
J. Marvin Hopper	Republican	1971-1976	87th-89th	Nashville
