= Tennessee House of Representatives 46th district =

State legislative district in Tennessee

Tennessee's 46th State House of Representatives district
- Map of Tennessee House districts with the 46th District shaded in red
Representative
Clark Boyd; R–Gallatin
since 2023
- Demographics: 78.5% White; 7.8% Black; 7.7% Hispanic; 1.6% Asian; 3.5% Multiracial
- Population (2024): 83,528

The Tennessee House of Representatives 46th district is one of the 99 legislative districts in the lower house of the Tennessee General Assembly. The district is located in Middle Tennessee and covers eastern Wilson County. The district includes most of Lebanon and surrounding unincorporated areas. It also includes Watertown, LaGuardo, Norene, and Tuckers Crossroads. Much of the northern border of the district is formed by Old Hickory Lake and the Cumberland River. Clark Boyd has represented the district since 2023.

== Demographics ==
The Tennessee Comptroller estimates the population as of 2024 at 83,528.

- 78.5% of the district is White
- 7.8% of the district is Black
- 7.7% of the district is Hispanic
- 1.6% of the district is Asian
- 3.5% of the district is Two or more races

Detailed demographic information is also available through Census Reporter.

== History ==
The 88th Tennessee General Assembly was the first in which all districts were numbered. At that time, the 46th district was part of Trousdale and Wilson counties. At the 93rd GAs, it was part of Claiborne, Grainger, and Hancock, Jefferson, and Sevier counties. From the 94th-97th GAs, it was composed of just Wilson County. From the 98th-102nd GAs, it was again composed of Trousdale and part of Wilson counties. From the 103rd-107th GAs, it was composed of Cannon, Trousdale and part of Wilson counties. From the 108th-112th GAs, it was composed of Cannon and part of Wilson and DeKalb counties. Since the 113th General Assembly, it has been part of Wilson County.

== List of Representatives ==
Representative	Party	Years of Service	General Assembly	Hometown
Clark Boyd	Republican	2017-present	110th-114th	Lebanon
Mark Pody	Republican	2011-2016	107th-109th	Lebanon
Stratton Bone Jr.	Democratic	1997-2010	100th-106th	Lebanon
Joe Walter Bell	Democratic	1977-1996	90th-99th	Lebanon
Gentry Crowell	Democratic	1969-1976	86th-89th	Lebanon
