= Vine, Tennessee =

- Unincorporated Community
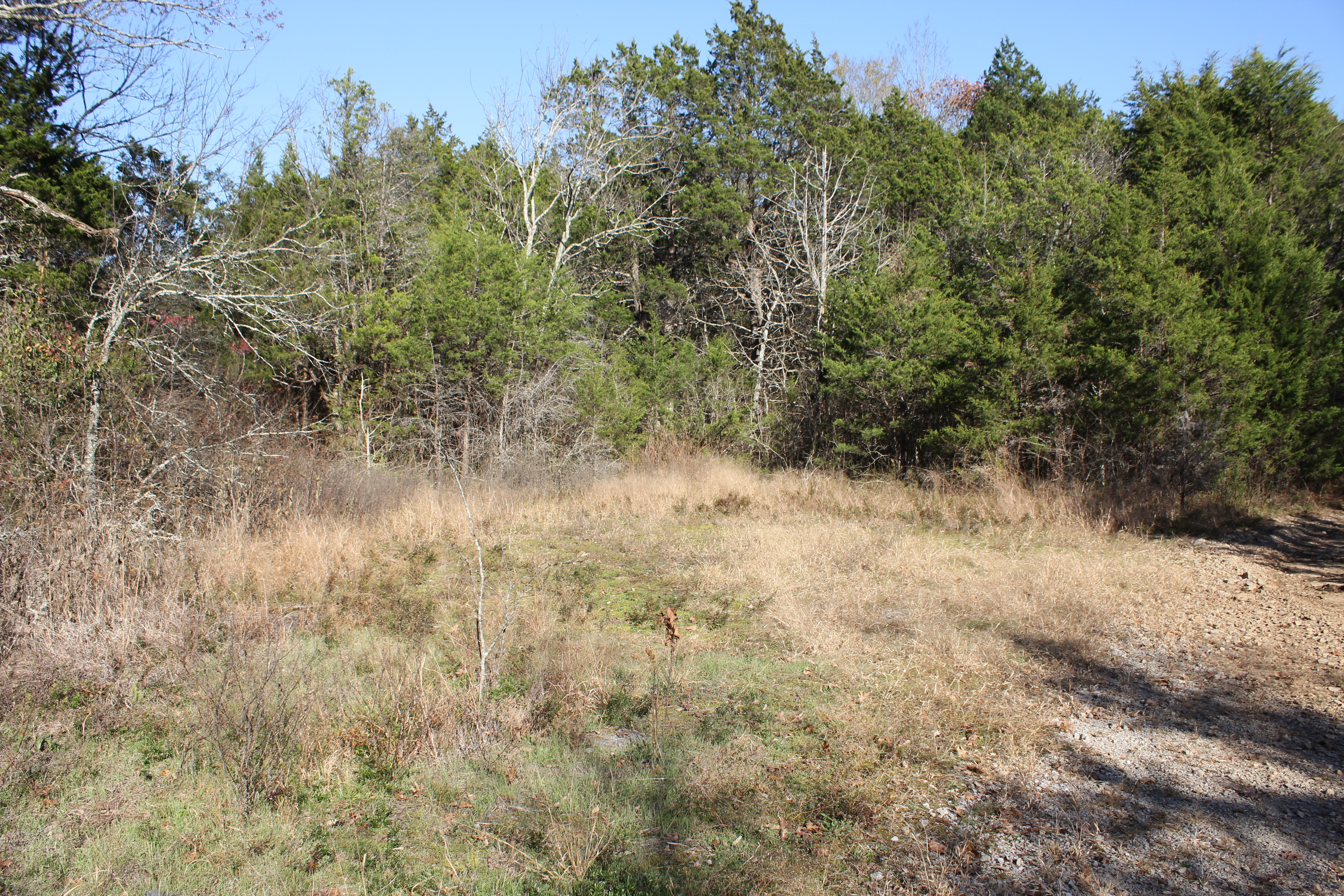
- Vine Cedar Glade
- Interactive map of Vine, Tennessee
- Coordinates: 36°01′52″N 86°21′28″W
- Country: United States
- State: Tennessee
- County: Wilson
- Elevation: 610 ft (186 m)
- Time zone: UTC-6 (Central (CST))
  - Summer (DST): UTC-5 (CDT)
- ZIP code: 37090
- Area code: 615
- GNIS feature ID: 1304307

Vine is an unincorporated community in Wilson County, 12.9 miles (20.7 km) south of Lebanon in the U.S. state of Tennessee. It is located along U.S. Route 231, SR 10, and SR 452. Boundaries for the community are imprecise but typically considered to be the communities of Gladeville to the west, Vesta to the north, Norene to the east, and Silver Hill to the south in Rutherford County. It shares the assigned zip code of 37090 with the rest of southern Wilson County.

== History ==
The community was once referred to as "McCullogh," likely referring to the family that produced brothers General Benjamin McCulloch and General Henry McCulloch, born just across the border in Rutherford County. The community was also once referred to as "Drennan," likely referring to the family of clear cutting loggers that once lived in the area. This form of deforestation stripped the land of its Juniper (commonly referred to as Eastern Red Cedar) supply prior to the 1930s and was one of many improper farming techniques that prompted widespread topsoil erosion to leave behind only the poor subsoil indicative of the region. Its current name of Vine is believed to have been explained by a local resident during an interview with a newspaper, in which he referred to nearby Lebanon as a "branch" of Nashville and the local community as a "vine." Use of the current name can be traced back on an official map to 1907.

A local post office was once operated in an existing structure on the east side of SR 10 (replaced by U.S. Route 231 since its completion in the 1940s). Records indicate that there were as many as three post offices in operation at some point in or around Vine before the adoption of rural free delivery: Simmons Bluff (1868-1903), McCullogh (1886-1903), and Vine (1894-1903). However it is not immediately clear which of the latter two branches was in operation at this location. After the closing of the post office, the building served as a general store, then a short lived VHS rental store named Vine Video around 1986, and finally an antique store. It is not currently in regular use.

Evidence remains for a few other former establishments in the community. A school house was in operation during the first half of the twentieth century at the current Vine Church of Christ building on the west side of SR 10. A small antique shop strip with a restaurant named Cooksey's was in operation on the east side of SR 10 (part of which was converted to a short lived market in the 1980s before once again becoming an antique store). Only a single building of the strip still remains. The long-standing Alsup Grocery (demolished around 2017 after having been out of operation for about a decade) was located on the west side of SR 10 at the site of a current chain store. Around the turn of the 21st century, on the east side of U.S. Route 231, a bed and breakfast named Cedarvine Manor (now a multipurpose farm venue) was put into operation from an old farmhouse that also served as an American Civil War hospital.

On January 24, 1997 at 4:37pm local time, an F2 tornado destroyed at least two dwellings in Vine when it touched down near the former toll bridge on SR 10. The total damage to Vine and the surrounding communities included fourteen destroyed homes, twelve leveled barns, forty partially damaged houses, one hundred killed hogs, and one injured person.

== Landmarks ==
Vine is home to large portions of the 9,420-acre (3,810 ha) Cedars of Lebanon State Forest, well known for its cedar glades containing vast amounts of Juniper trees and the formerly endangered Tennessee purple coneflower. The most notable cedar glades within the Vine portion of the forest include the 35-acre Vine Cedar Glade and the 45-acre John & Hester Lane Cedar Glade, both designated as Class II Natural-Scientific State Natural Areas due to their abundance of rare plant specimens. Cedars of Lebanon State Park, located a few miles to the north, is a more protected portion of the much larger Cedars of Lebanon State Forest itself.

Vine is likewise home to the Nashville Superspeedway, which is also claimed by the unincorporated community of Gladeville located further away to the northwest. Other landmarks in the community include a warehouse complex adjacent to the Superspeedway, the privately owned Fall Creek Field airpark, a chain general store, a multipurpose farm venue, several churches, several cemeteries, and a single-lane concrete slab former toll bridge that charged ten cents per axle to cross in the 1930s in order to capitalize from the transport of cedar out of the community. The well house that also served as a toll booth for the bridge is still intact.

== Photo gallery ==
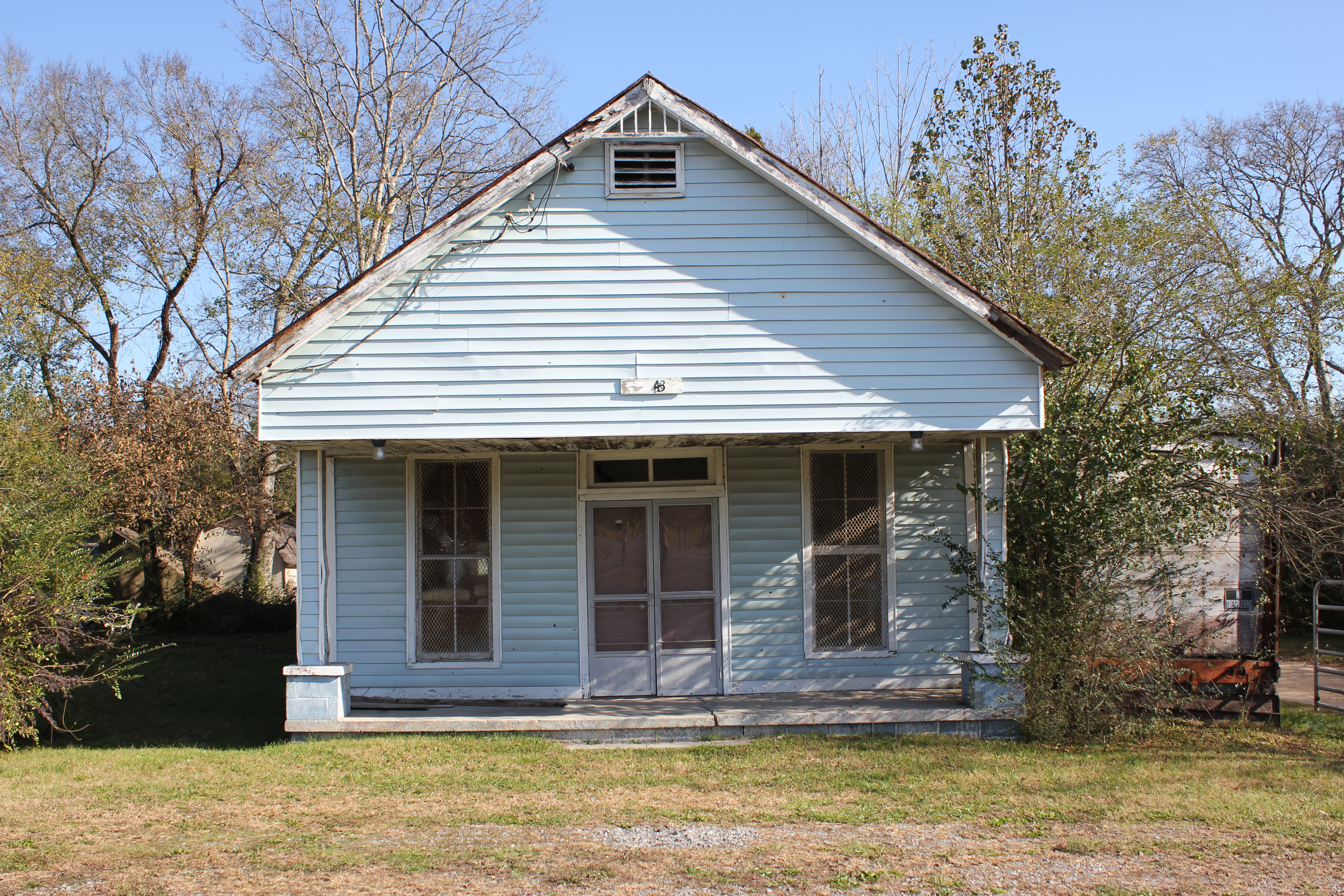
Former Vine Post Office

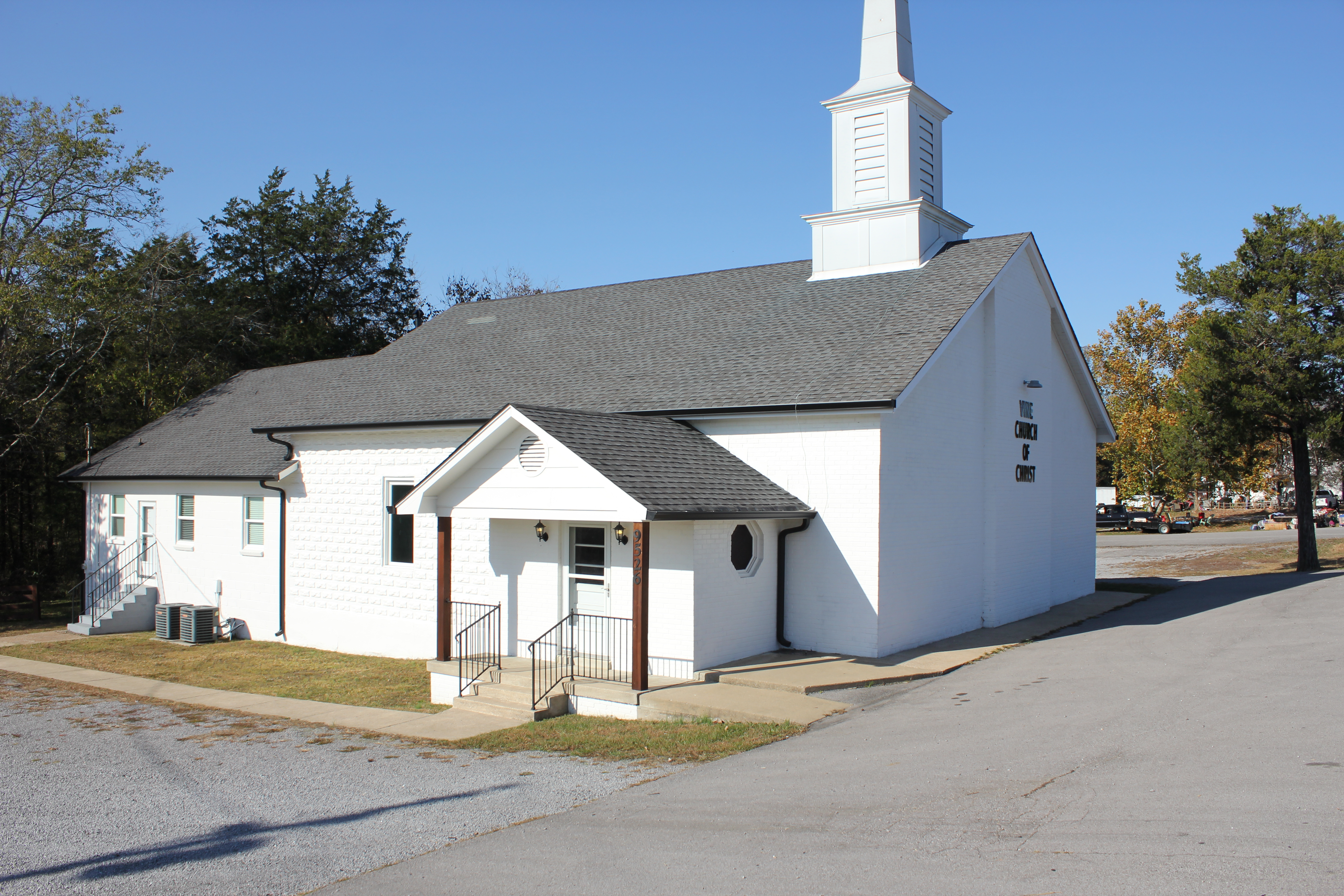
Church of Christ

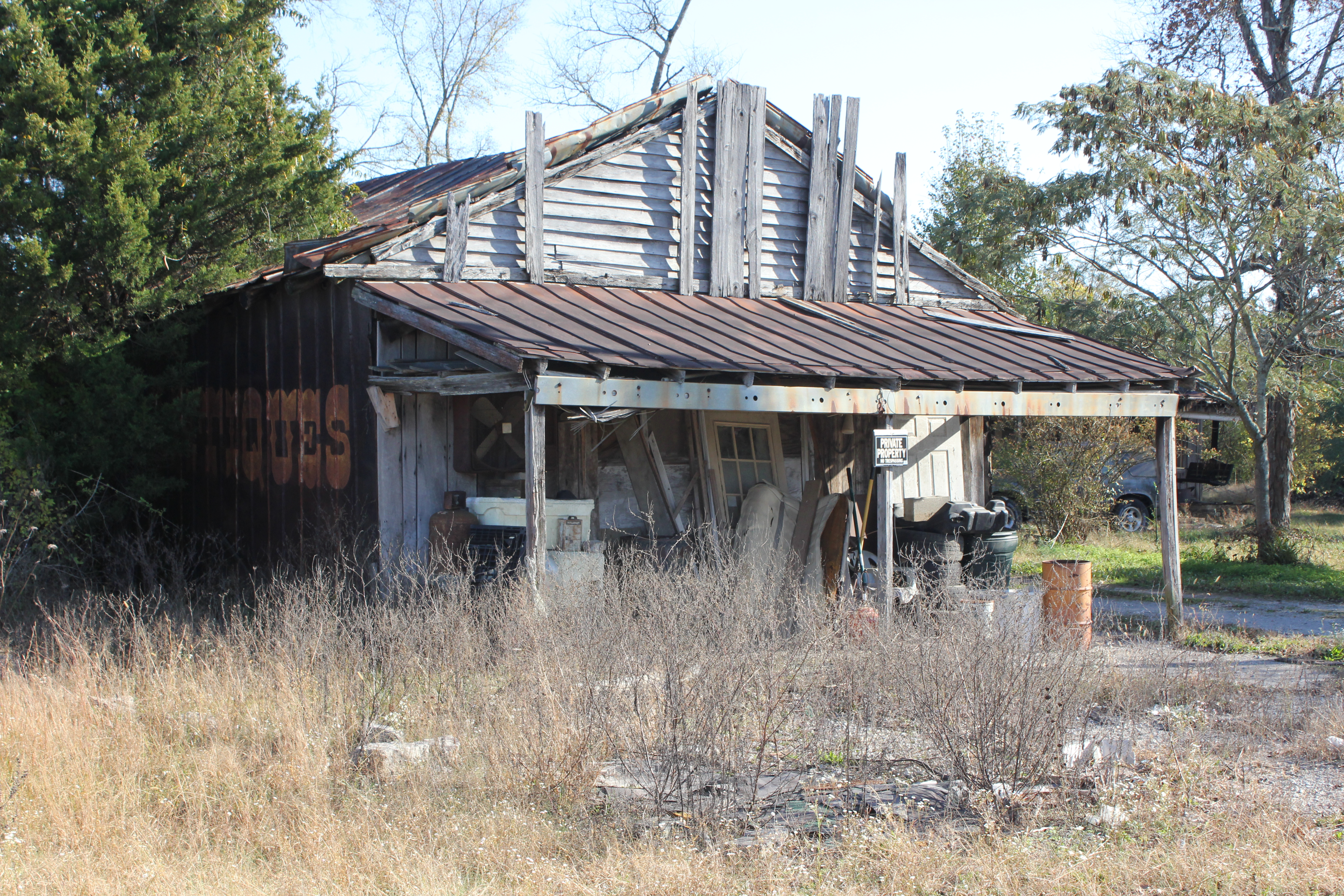
Former Antique Store

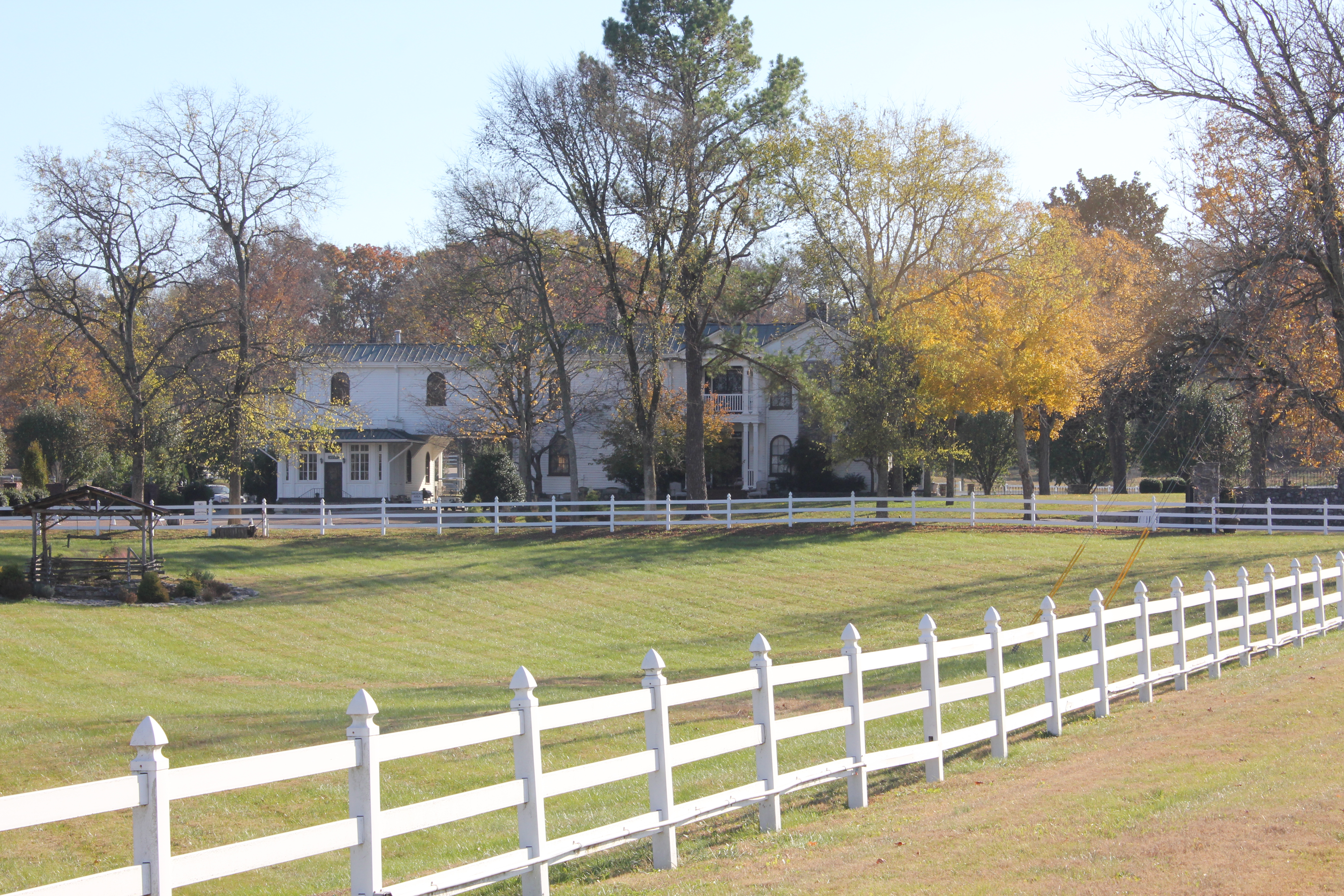
Former Cedarvine Manor

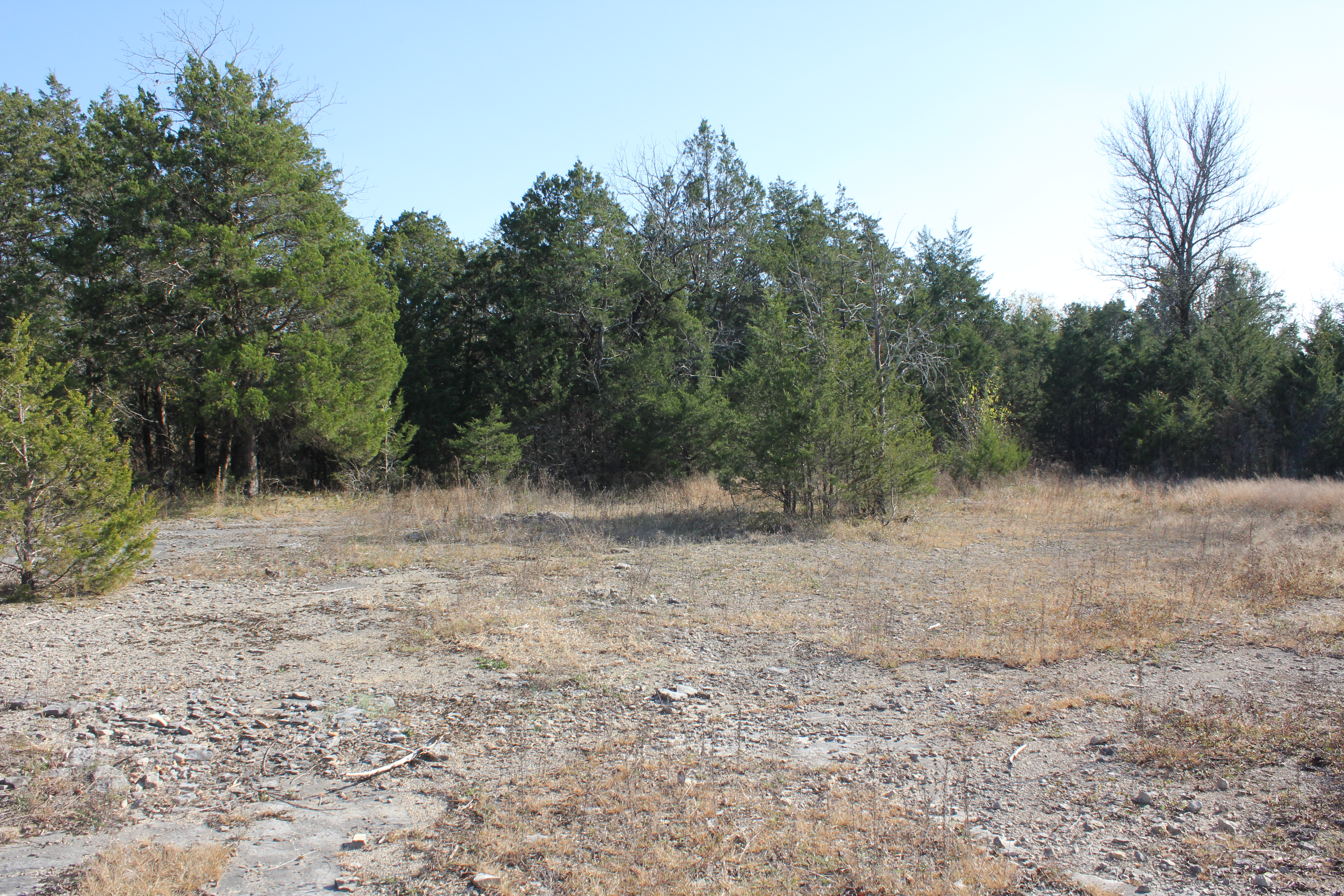
Lane Cedar Glade

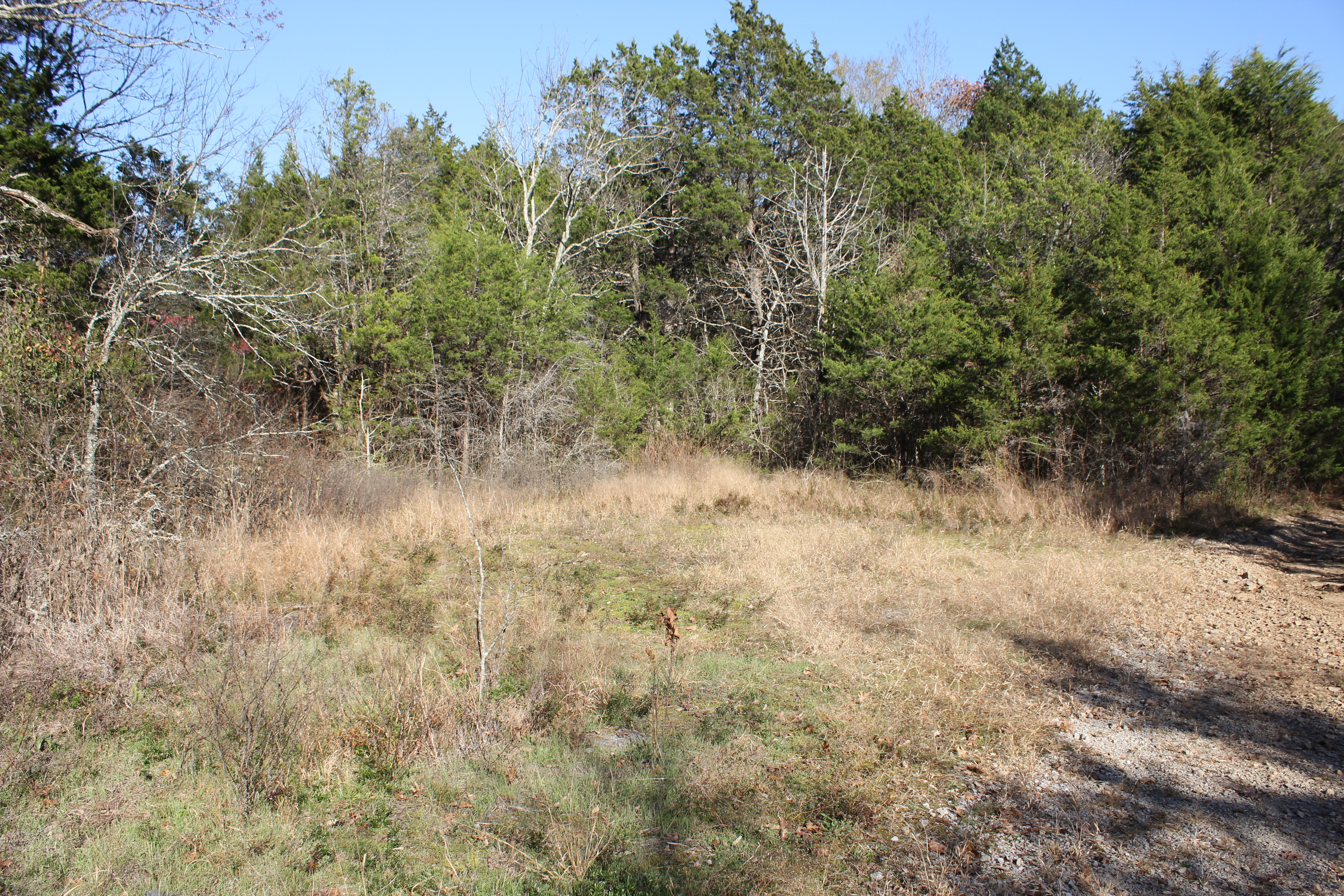
Vine Cedar Glade

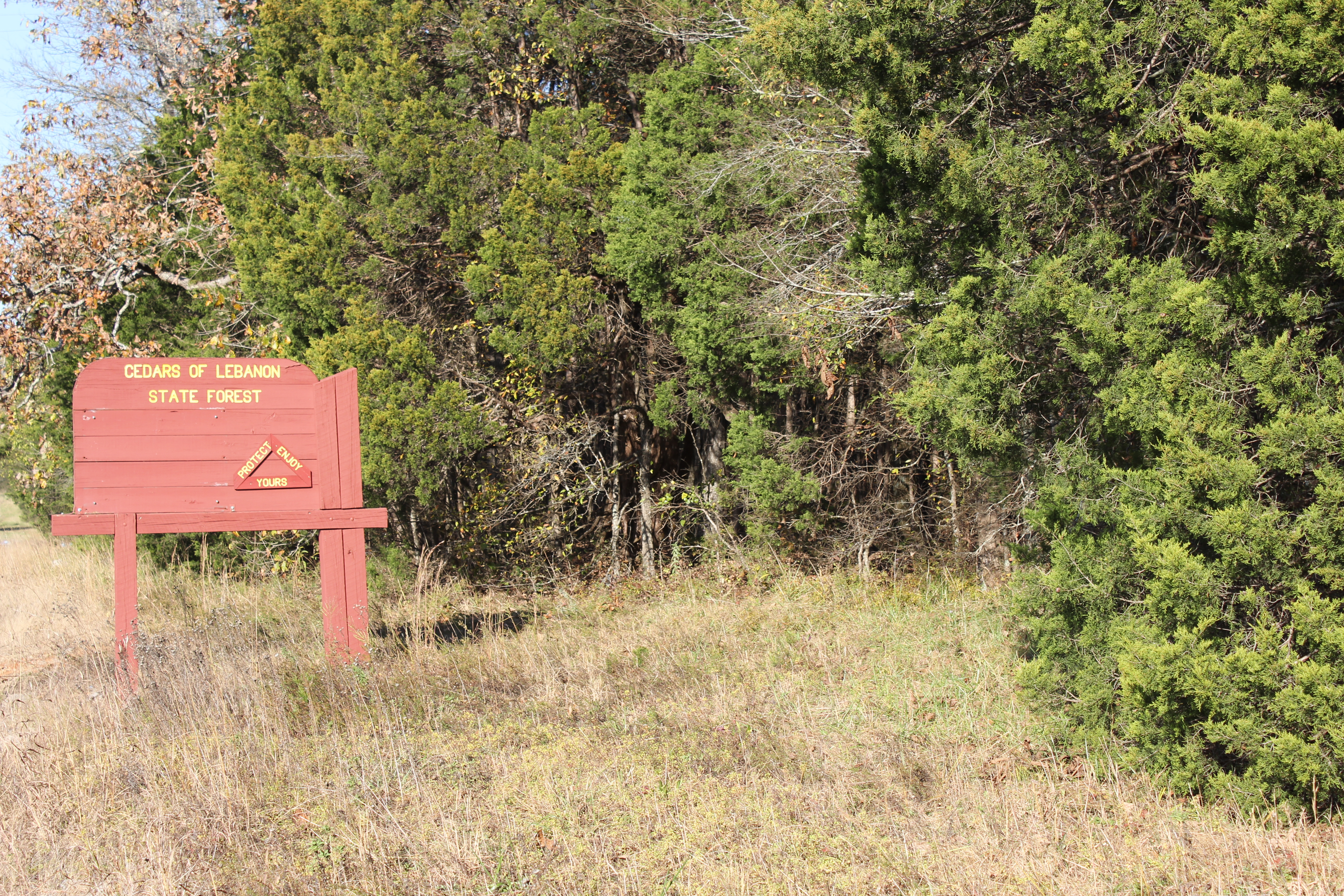
Cedars Of Lebanon State Forest

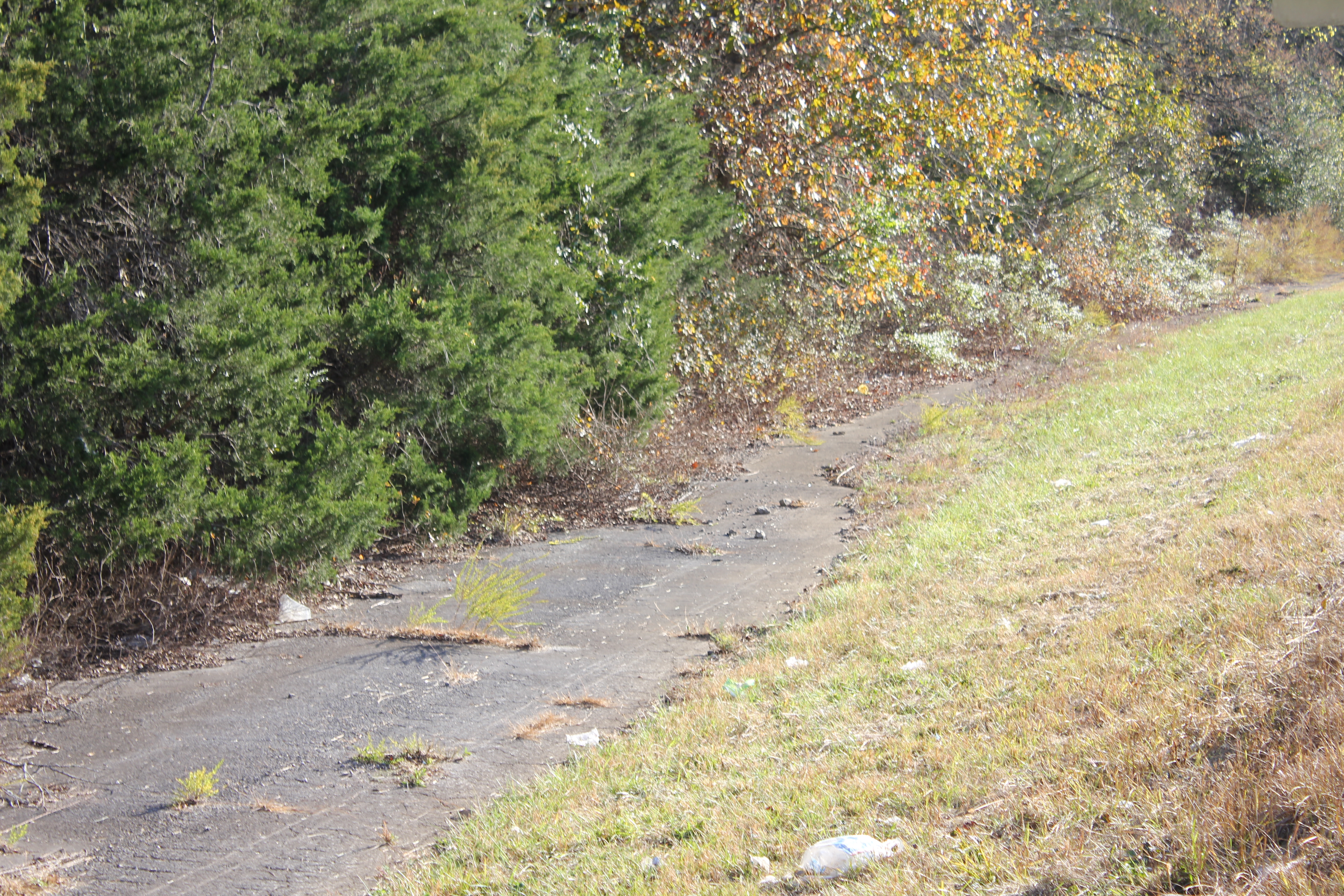
Old SR 10 Along State Forest

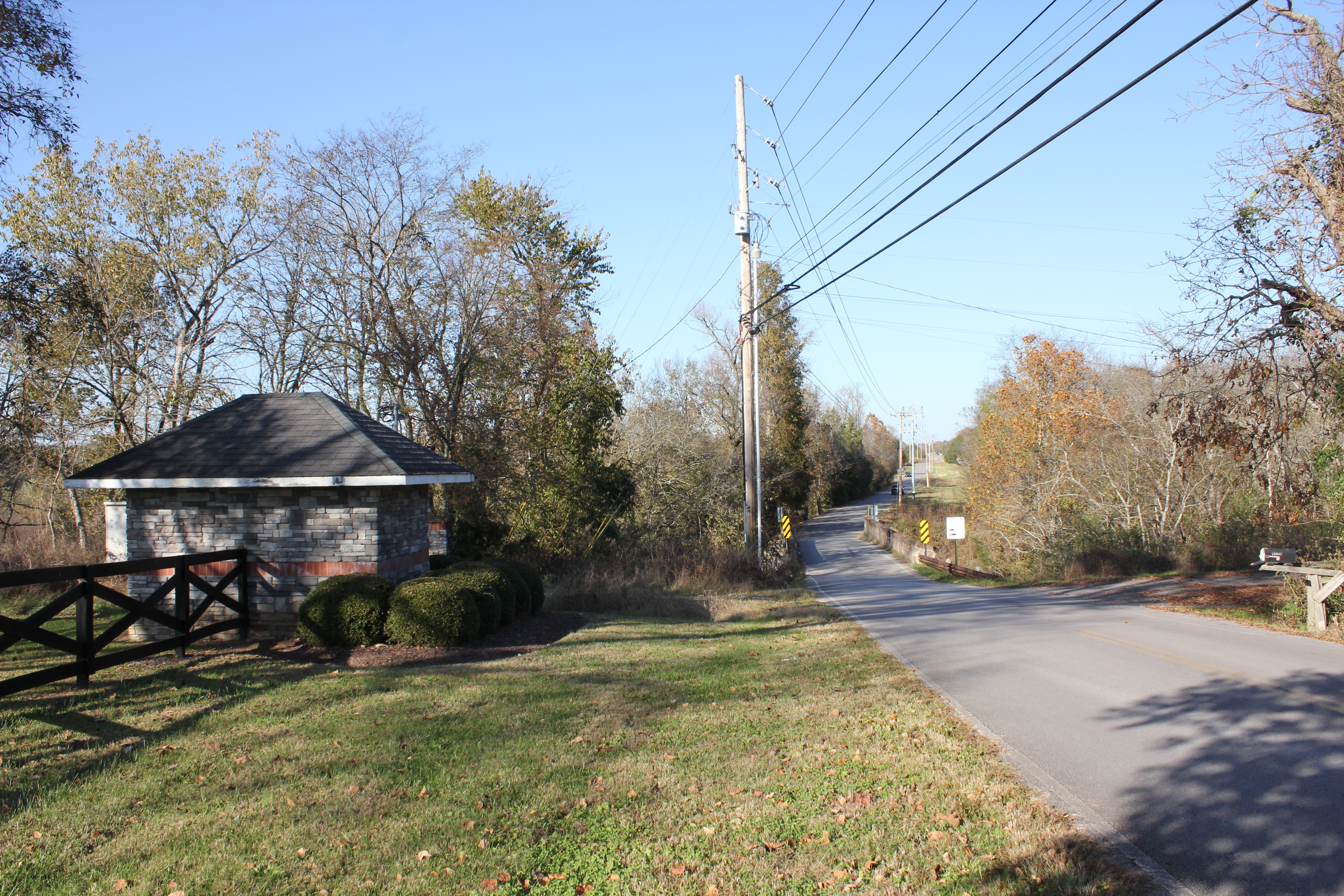
Former Toll Bridge And Booth

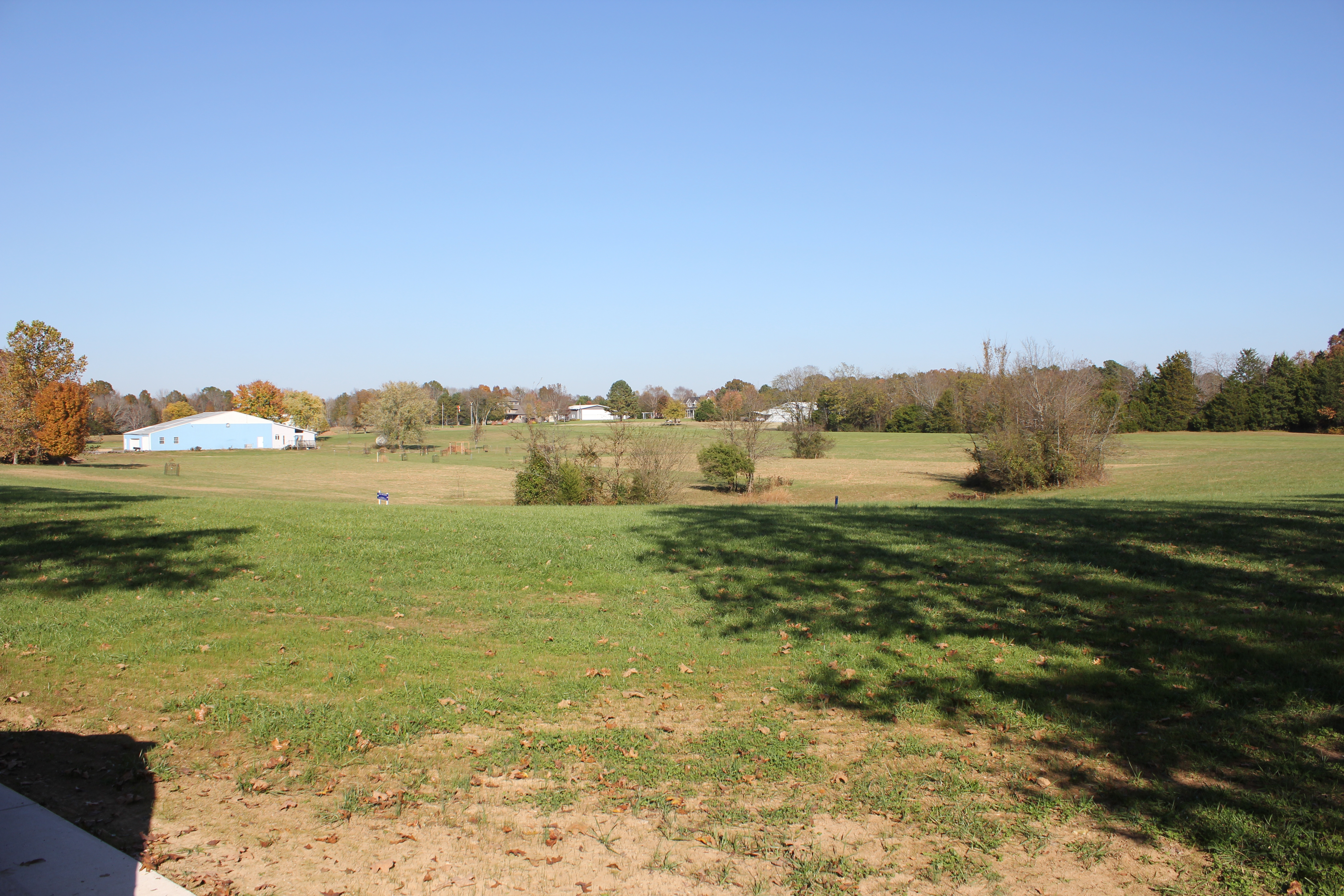
Fall Creek Field Airpark

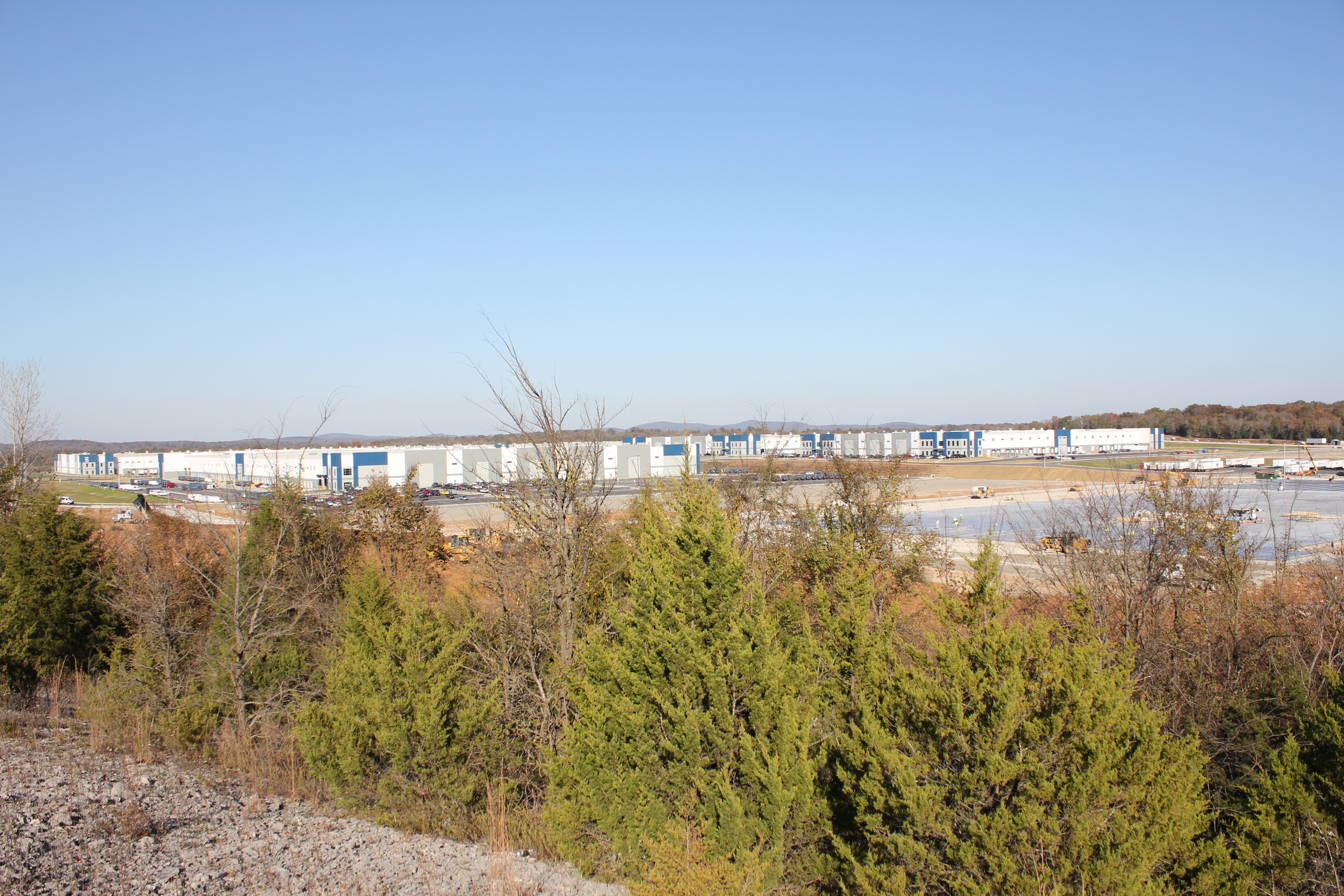
Industrial Park

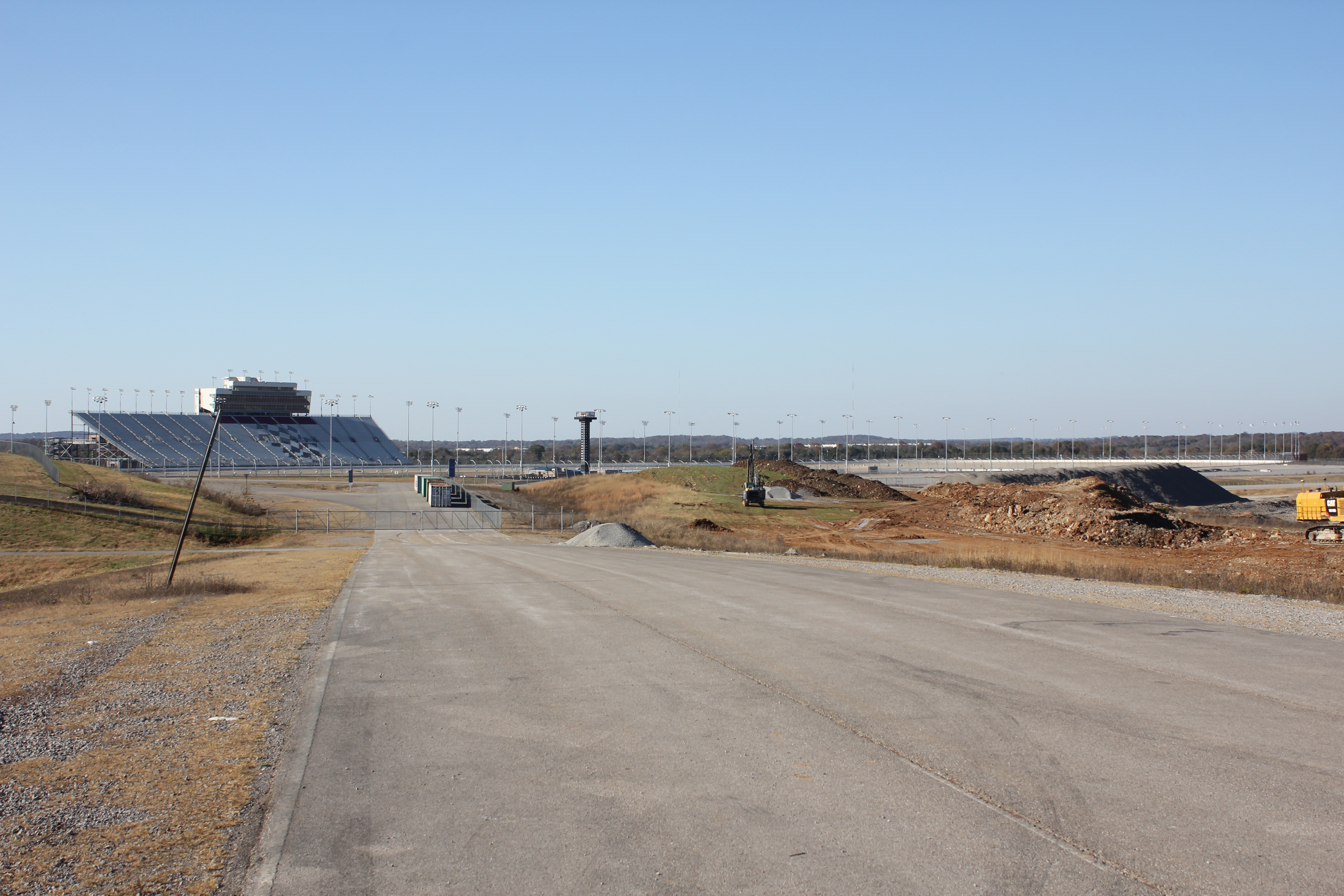
Nashville Superspeedway
