= Linda Elam =

American politician (born 1959)

Member of the Tennessee House of Representatives from the 57th district
- In office January 11, 2011 – January 8, 2013
- Preceded by: Susan Lynn
- Succeeded by: Susan Lynn

Personal details
- Born: Linda Carol Elam; June 23, 1959 (age 67) Tuscaloosa, Alabama, U.S.
- Party: Republican
- Education: University of Tennessee (BS, JD)
- Occupation: Politician; attorney

Linda Carol Elam (born June 23, 1959) is an American attorney and politician who served as a Republican member of the Tennessee House of Representatives from 2011 to 2013. She was a representative for the 57th district, including parts of Sumner County and Wilson County. Between 2004 and 2011, she also served as mayor of Mount Juliet.

== Early life and education ==
Linda Carol Elam was born on June 23, 1959, in Tuscaloosa, Alabama. She attended the University of Tennessee in Knoxville, earning her BS in business administration with honors in 1981. In 1992, she graduated magna cum laude with a JD from University of Tennessee Law School.

== Career and community work ==
After graduating from law school, Elam became a practicing attorney. She served in several leadership positions in Mt. Juliet and Wilson County, including on the Mt. Juliet Regional Planning Commission, where she became vice chair and later chair. Her local service culminated in a six-year tenure as Mt. Juliet's mayor; she was elected in 2004 and re-elected in 2008. Under her mayorship, she and eight other county officials filed a federal lawsuit against a fellow commissioner who allegedly collected their personal information through the state's criminal justice portal by running unauthorized background checks. The parties later agreed to a monetary settlement.

She has been a member of the board of directors of Summit Medical Center.

== Tennessee House of Representatives (2011–2013) ==
=== Elections ===
In 2010, incumbent Representative Susan Lynn announced that she would not seek election to her seat and instead run for the Tennessee Senate seat being vacated by Mae Beavers. Elam, in turn, announced her candidacy for Lynn's seat in the 57th House district, including parts of Sumner and Wilson counties. She won her election, taking office in January 2011. Meanwhile, Beavers backtracked on her decision to retire; in a close election, she won the Republican nomination against Lynn.

In 2012, Elam was challenged by Lynn, who was now seeking election back to her old seat. Elam criticized Lynn for running in a district in which she no longer lived and challenged Lynn to a debate. Lynn ignored the invitation, but promised to move into the district by the time of the general election. Despite the controversies, Lynn defeated Elam by a wide margin and went on to win the general election unopposed.

=== Tenure ===
After winning election to the Tennessee House of Representatives, Elam chose to continue serving simultaneously as Mt. Juliet's mayor. The city had passed a resolution the same election cycle preventing candidates from holding multiple offices, but in January 2011, a judge determined the restriction could not be applied to Elam and other city officials already in office. Elam contended that Mt. Juliet voters had elected her with the understanding that the resolution would not immediately go into effect. Later, Elam agreed to resign from the mayorship on March 31 to focus on her job in the legislature.

In 2012, Elam sponsored a bill requiring all candidates for office in Tennessee to produce several documents, including a long-form birth certificate. When asked by House Majority Leader Gerald McCormick if the legislation would keep Barack Obama off Tennessee's ballots, Elam responded that she did not know, but insisted that the legislation was "not a birther bill." Elam had also listed McCormick as a co-sponsor on the bill, apparently without his knowledge. The proposal was eventually postponed without debate, before expiring at the end of the assembly.

Elam sponsored several bills that became law, either directly or through companion legislation in the Senate. Her legislative efforts addressed several areas, including revisions to state probate law, liability protections for automobile dealerships lending vehicles to customers, and local zoning procedures. She also sponsored legislation authorizing a specialty license plate benefiting Concerns of Police Survivors and designating a Wilson County bridge in memory of a local soldier.

=== Committee assignments ===
During her time in the legislature, Elam was a member of the following House Committees:

- House Commerce Committee (107th General Assembly)
- House Ethics Committee (107th General Assembly)
- House Judiciary Committee (107th General Assembly)

== Personal life ==
Elam is single. She is a Baptist.
