= Rural Hill =

Rural Hill may refer to:

- Rural Hill, Illinois, an unincorporated community in Hamilton County
- Rural Hill, Tennessee, a census-designated place in Wilson County
