= Suggs Creek, Tennessee =

- Unincorporated community
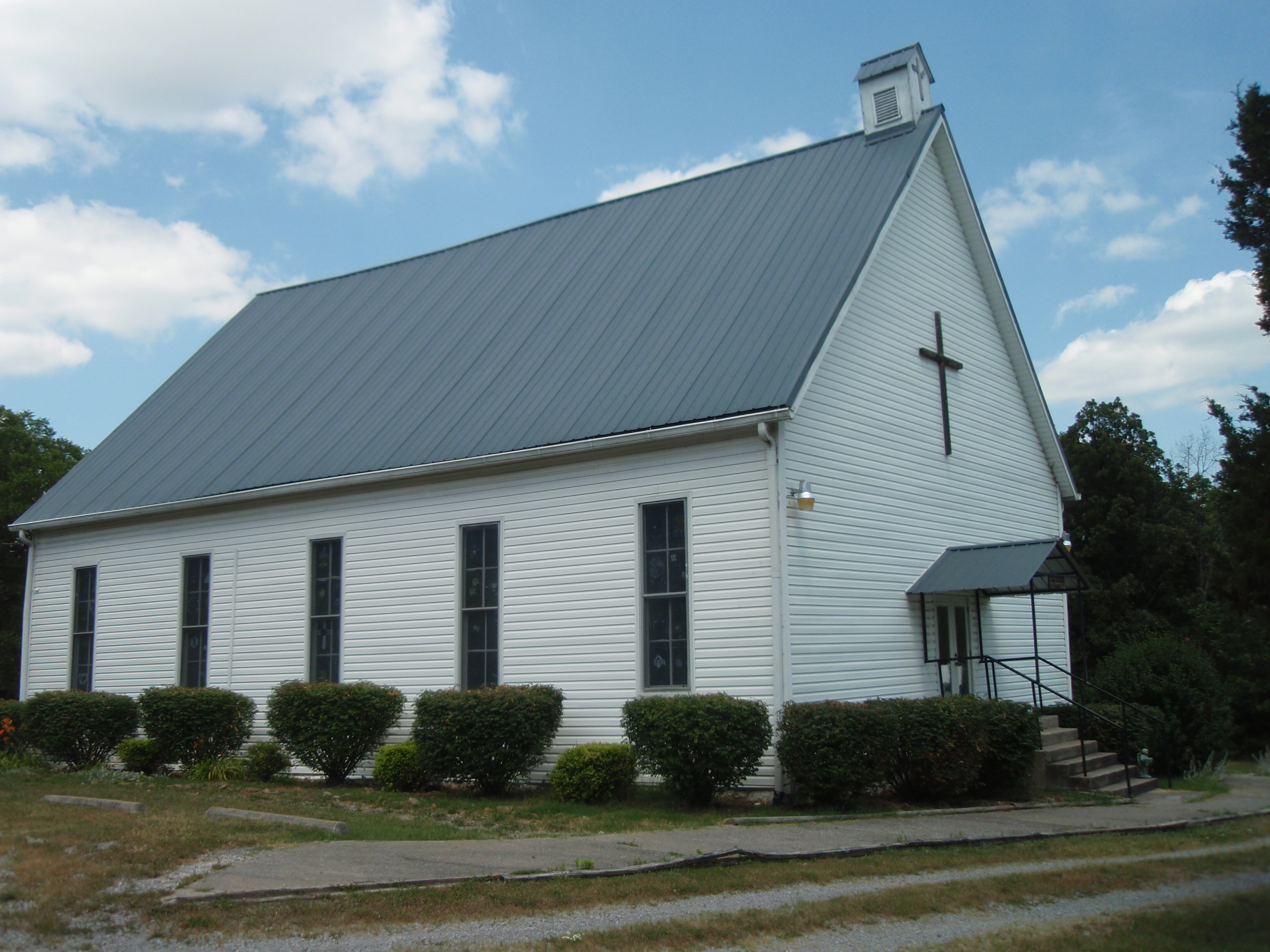
- Suggs Creek Cumberland Presbyterian Church
- Interactive map of Suggs Creek, Tennessee
- Coordinates: 36°07′07″N 86°29′43″W
- Country: United States
- State: Tennessee
- County: Wilson
- Elevation: 548 ft (167 m)
- Time zone: UTC-6 (Central (CST))
  - Summer (DST): UTC-5 (CDT)
- Area code: 615
- GNIS feature ID: 1271741

Suggs Creek is an unincorporated community in Wilson County, Tennessee, United States. It is located around the intersection of Stewarts Ferry Pike and Corinth Road. The community has a general store and two churches. The Lantern Lane Farm has been featured on RFD-TV. The community is bordered by Rural Hill to the west, Gladeville to the east and rural Mt. Juliet to the north.
