= Taylorsville, Tennessee =

Unincorporated community in Tennessee, US

Coordinates: 36.275608°N 86.199712°W

Taylorsville is an unincorporated community in Wilson County, in the U.S. state of Tennessee. It is located in the intersection of Tennessee State Route 141, Centerville Road, and Johnson Road.

== History ==
Taylorsville was platted in 1840, and named for John N. Taylor, the original owner of the town site.
