= Liberty Hill, Wilson County, Tennessee =

Liberty Hill, Tennessee
- Unincorporated community
- Location within Tennessee Location within the United States
- Coordinates: 36°02′36″N 86°03′47″W
- Country: United States
- State: Tennessee
- County: Wilson
- Elevation: 791 ft (241 m)
- Time zone: UTC-6 (Central (CST))
  - Summer (DST): UTC-5 (CDT)
- Area code: 615
- GNIS feature ID: 1315395

Liberty Hill is an unincorporated community in Wilson County, Tennessee, United States. Liberty Hill is 5.5 miles (8.9 km) southeast of Watertown.
