= Dixon Lanier Merritt =

American poet, humorist, and newspaper editor

- Born: July 9, 1879; Wilson County, Tennessee, U.S.
- Died: January 9, 1972 (aged 92); Nashville, Tennessee, U.S.
- Education: B.A.
- Alma mater: University of Nashville
- Occupations: Newspaper editor, historian, poet
- Writing career
- Years active: 1896–1961
- Notable works: (with Will Thomas Hale) A History of Tennessee and Tennesseans (1913)

Dixon Lanier Merritt (July 9, 1879–January 9, 1972) was an American poet and humorist. He was a newspaper editor for the Tennessean, Nashville's morning paper, and President of the American Press Humorists Association.

== Biography ==
Born Dixon Lanier Abernathy, his parents divorced while he was a child and one of his five uncles subsequently adopted him. At age 21, he legally changed his surname to Merritt, which he regretted later in life.

Dixon Merritt was married twice. He was first married to Harriotte Triplett Johnson of Kentucky, with whom he had a son and a daughter, though the marriage ended in divorce. He later married Ruth Yates of New York, with whom he had two sons.

He penned this well-known limerick in 1910:

A wonderful bird is the pelican,
His bill will hold more than his belican,
He can take in his beak
Enough food for a week
But I'm damned if I see how the helican!

or:

A funny old bird is a pelican.
His beak can hold more than his belican.
Food for a week
He can hold in his beak,
But I don't know how the helican.

The limerick, inspired by a post card sent to him by a female reader of his newspaper column who was visiting Florida beaches, is often misattributed to Ogden Nash and is widely misquoted, as demonstrated above. It is quoted in a number of scholarly works on ornithology, including Manual of Ornithology: Avian Structure and Function, by Noble S. Proctor and Patrick J. Lynch, and several others.

Merritt served as Tennessee State Director of Public Safety, taught at Cumberland University and was editor of The Tennessean and Lebanon Democrat newspapers and later contributed a column for many years called "Our Folks". In 1913 he collaborated with Will Thomas Hale on "A History of Tennessee and Tennesseans: The Leaders and Representative Men in Commerce, Industry and Modern Activities". During the 1920s he was the Southern correspondent for Outlook magazine, a weekly news magazine aimed at rural readers. He edited a comprehensive "History of Wilson County (Tennessee)" in his eighties. He worked for the U.S. federal government twice, around the time of both World Wars, and ultimately retired from the Rural Electrification Administration's telephone program office. In 1919, Merritt was the Assistant in Charge for the Press Service at the United States Department of Agriculture where he wrote humorous press releases.

Merritt was a founding member of the Tennessee Ornithological Society. A nature center at the Tennessee Cedars of Lebanon State Park is named for him. He served as President of the Society of American Press Humorists. Following World War I he returned to the familial farm near Lebanon, TN and using portions of various cedar log cabins nearly one hundred years old assembled a new structure on a hill which he dubbed "Cabincroft" — 'croft' being a Scottish word for a place of shelter. He maintained a working farm into his seventies preferring natural methods.
