= Cainsville, Tennessee =

Unincorporated community in Wilson County, Tennessee

Coordinates: 35°59′07″N 86°14′56″W

Cainsville is an unincorporated community in Wilson County, in the U.S. state of Tennessee.

== History ==
Cainsville was platted in 1829, and named for George I. Cain, the original owner of the town site. A post office called Cainsville was established in 1830, and remained in operation until 1903.
