= Egan, Tennessee =

- Unincorporated community
- Location within Tennessee Location within the United States
- Coordinates: 36°13′19″N 86°20′45″W
- Country: United States
- State: Tennessee
- County: Wilson
- Elevation: 558 ft (170 m)
- Time zone: UTC-5 (Eastern (EST))
  - Summer (DST): UTC-4 (EDT)
- Area code: 615
- GNIS feature ID: 1283569

Egan is an unincorporated community in Wilson County, Tennessee, United States.
