= Cedar Grove, Wilson County, Tennessee =

Cedar Grove, Tennessee
- Unincorporated community
- Location within Tennessee Location within the United States
- Coordinates: 36°15′06″N 86°31′40″W
- Country: United States
- State: Tennessee
- County: Wilson
- Elevation: 581 ft (177 m)
- Time zone: UTC-6 (Central (CST))
  - Summer (DST): UTC-5 (CDT)
- Area code: 615
- GNIS feature ID: 1312820

Cedar Grove is an unincorporated community in Wilson County, Tennessee, United States. Cedar Grove is located along the northwestern border of Mt. Juliet.
