= Tater Peeler, Tennessee =

- Unincorporated community
- Location within Tennessee Location within the United States
- Coordinates: 36°6′1″N 86°16′34″W
- Country: United States
- State: Tennessee
- County: Wilson
- Elevation: 732 ft (223 m)
- Time zone: UTC-6 (Central (CST))
  - Summer (DST): UTC-5 (CDT)
- GNIS feature ID: 1312887

Tater Peeler was an unincorporated community in Wilson County, Tennessee.
