= Susan Lynn =

American politician (born 1964)

Member of the Tennessee House of Representatives from the 57th district
- Incumbent
- Assumed office January 8, 2013
- Preceded by: Linda Elam
- In office January 8, 2003 – January 11, 2011
- Preceded by: Mae Beavers
- Succeeded by: Linda Elam

Personal details
- Born: April 26, 1964 (age 62) Philadelphia, Pennsylvania, U.S.
- Party: Republican
- Spouse: Michael Lynn
- Children: 2
- Education: Tennessee State University (BS)
- Website: House website

Susan M. Lynn (born April 26, 1964) is an American politician and a Republican member of the Tennessee House of Representatives. She has represented the 57th district since 2003, except for one term from 2011 to 2013.

== Early life ==
Susan Lynn was born on April 26, 1964, in Philadelphia, Pennsylvania. She graduated high school from Newburgh Free Academy in Newburgh, New York, and completed her BS in economics at Tennessee State University.

== Political career ==
In March 2018, she sponsored legislation requiring Tennessee schools to prominently display "In God We Trust".

In 2020, Lynn voted against removal of a bust honoring Ku Klux Klan Grand Wizard Nathan Bedford Forrest from the Tennessee State Capitol building.

Lynn proposed an anti-transgender bathroom bill in 2016. She called transgender identity a "mental disorder".

With Bill Ketron, Lynn sponsored a "no-go zone" bill in February 2015.

In 2023, Lynn supported a resolution to expel three Democratic lawmakers from the legislature for violating decorum rules. The expulsion was widely characterized as unprecedented.

=== Electoral history ===
2002

Lynn's first race for elected office. She ran in a four-way Republican Primary, winning with 50.2% of the vote. In the General election, she faced Democratic nominee Danny Farmer, whom she defeated with 62.9% of the vote.

2004

In her first re-election campaign, Lynn was challenged in the Republican Primary by Tom Wood. She defeated him by a margin of two to one. She was unopposed in the General Election.

2006

In 2006, Lynn was unopposed for both the Republican Primary and the General election.

2008

Lynn ran unopposed in the 2008 primary, then faced Democratic nominee Ken Wilkinson in the General election, which she won with 74.4% of the vote. Appointed Chairman of the House Government Operations Committee by Speaker Kent Williams.

2010

Upon the announced retirement of the 17th district state Senator Mae Beavers, Lynn filed to run for state Senate instead of running again her state House seat. However, ten months later, Beavers had a sudden change of heart, and in a surprise move re-entered the Senate race.13 Following a three-way Republican primary, Beavers won re-election with 48.3% of the vote. Lynn finished second with 42.4%.14

2012

To regain her former seat, Lynn had to face Linda Elam, former mayor of Mt. Juliet who had been serving in the General Assembly since Lynn's departure in 2010. She dispatched Elam with a margin of 67.6% to 32.4%. She was then unopposed in the General Election. Appointed Chairman of the House Consumer & Human Resources Subcommittee by Speaker Beth Harwell.

2014

Lynn ran unopposed in the primary, then defeated the Democratic challenger, Jesse McLevain, with 76.6% of the vote. Reappointed Chairman of the House Consumer & Human Resources Subcommittee by Speaker Beth Harwell.

2016

Lynn ran unopposed in the primary, then defeated the Democratic challenger, Trisha Farmer, with 69.2% of the vote. Reappointed Chairman of the House Consumer & Human Resources Subcommittee by Speaker Beth Harwell.

2018

In 2018, Lynn faced Aaron Shane in the Republican primary, whom she defeated with 65.7% of the Republican vote. She defeated Democrat Jordan Cole in the General Election, with 68.3% of the vote.

2020

For her tenth election season, Lynn was unopposed in the Republican primary, then won the General Election with 69.4% of the vote over independent candidate Tom Sottek.

2023

On April 19, 2023; Lynn passed a bill to permit District Attorney Generals to prosecute book publishers who intentionally send sexually explicit books to schools for their library collections. In 2021, Lynn passed a bill to direct the removal of sexually explicit books from K-12 libraries.

== Personal life ==
Lynn is the Financial Controller for a real estate holding company in Mt. Juliet. She has a husband, Michael, and two children and six grandchildren. She is a Southern Baptist. Lynn and her husband own an insurance agency in Mt. Juliet.
