= Cherry Valley, Tennessee =

Community in Tennessee, US

Coordinates: 36°05′54″N 86°09′50″W

Cherry Valley is an unincorporated community just south of Lebanon Tennessee Wilson County, in the U.S. state of Tennessee.

== History ==
Cherry Valley was platted in 1848. A post office called Cherry Valley was established in 1850, and remained in operation until 1904.
