= Belinda City, Tennessee =

- Community
- Location within Tennessee Location within the United States
- Coordinates: 36°10′03″N 86°29′09″W
- Country: United States
- State: Tennessee
- County: Wilson
- City: Mt. Juliet
- Elevation: 587 ft (179 m)
- Time zone: UTC-6 (Central (CST))
  - Summer (DST): UTC-6 (CDT)
- Zip code: 37122
- Area code: 615
- GNIS feature ID: 1647665

Belinda City is a colloquial name given to a community in the city of Mount Juliet, Wilson County, Tennessee.

The community was originally an unincorporated area in west-central Wilson County running along Belinda parkway, just southeast of the city of Mt. Juliet. The community was annexed by the city of Mount Juliet in 1990, under city ordinance 1990–10.

Mount Juliet Annexation Map
