= Jordan Anderson =

Author of the 1865 Letter from a Freedman to His Old Master

Jourdon Anderson
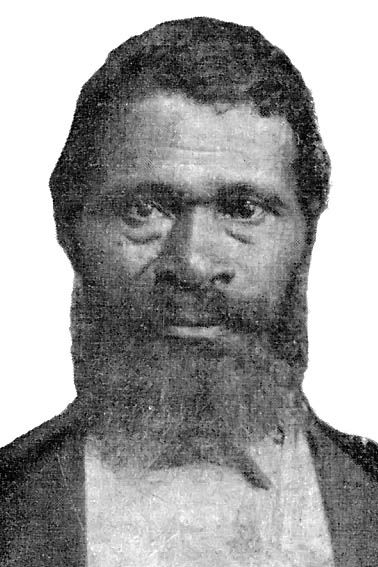
- Author of the 1865 Letter from a Freedman to His Old Master
- Born: Jourdon Anderson; December 1825; Tennessee, U.S.
- Died: April 15, 1905 (aged 79); Dayton, Ohio, U.S.
- Resting place: Woodland Cemetery
- Spouse: Amanda "Mandy" McGregor (m. 1848)
- Children: 11

Jordan Anderson or Jourdon Anderson (December 1825 – April 15, 1905) was an African-American former slave noted for an 1865 letter he dictated, later titled by publishers as "Letter from a Freedman to His Old Master". It was addressed to his former master, Colonel P. H. Anderson, from whom Jordan Anderson had taken his surname, in response to the colonel's request that Anderson return to the colonel's plantation to help restore the farm after the disarray of the American Civil War. It has been described as a rare example of documented "slave humor" of the period and its deadpan style has been compared favorably to the satire of Mark Twain.

== Life ==
Anderson was born in December 1825 somewhere in Tennessee. By the age of seven or eight, he was sold as a slave to General Paulding Anderson of Big Spring in Wilson County, and subsequently passed to the general's son Patrick Henry Anderson, probably as a personal servant and playmate as the two were of similar age. In 1848, Jordan Anderson married Amanda (Mandy) McGregor. The two eventually would have 11 children.

In 1864, Union Army soldiers camped on the Anderson plantation and freed Jordan Anderson. He then may have worked at the Cumberland Military Hospital in Nashville before eventually settling in Dayton, Ohio, moving with the help of Clarke McDermont who was a surgeon at the hospital. There Anderson found work as a servant, janitor, coachman, or hostler, until 1894, when he became a sexton, probably at the Wesleyan Methodist Church. He held this position until his death. His employer, Valentine Winters, was father-in-law to McDermont.

Anderson died in Dayton on April 15, 1905, of "exhaustion" at 79 years old, and is buried in Woodland Cemetery, one of the oldest "garden" cemeteries in the United States. Amanda died April 12, 1913; she is buried next to him.

== Letter and aftermath ==
Letter from a Freedman to His Old Master
Read by Winston Tharp for LibriVox
Audio 00:05:17 (full text)

In July 1865, a few months after the end of the Civil War, Colonel P. H. Anderson wrote a letter from Big Spring, Tennessee, to his former and now freed slave Jordan Anderson asking him to come back and work the plantation, which had been left in disarray from the war. Harvest season was approaching with nobody to bring in the crops; the colonel was making a last-ditch effort to save the farm.

On August 7, from his home in Ohio, Jordan Anderson dictated a letter in response through his abolitionist employer, attorney Valentine Winters, who had it published in the Cincinnati Commercial. The letter became an immediate media sensation with reprints in the New York Daily Tribune of August 22, 1865, and Lydia Maria Child's The Freedmen's Book the same year.

In the letter, Jordan Anderson describes his better life in Ohio, and asks his former master for $11,680 in back wages (well over $100,000 inflation adjusted as of 2024). Jordan calculated wages at $25 a month for 32 years for himself and $2 a week for 20 years for his wife Mandy. He also asked for accumulated interest, minus the costs for their clothing, "three doctor's visits to me, and pulling a tooth for Mandy". He asks the back wages be delivered via the Adams Express company, stating: "If you fail to pay us for faithful labors in the past, we can have little faith in your promises in the future." Anderson asks if his daughters will be safe living in Tennessee and able to have an education, since they are "good-looking girls" and notes that he would rather die "than have my girls brought to shame by the violence and wickedness of their young masters ... how it was with poor Matilda and Catherine." The letter concludes: "Say howdy to George Carter, and thank him for taking the pistol from you when you were shooting at me."

Colonel Anderson, having failed to attract his former slaves back, sold the land for a pittance to try to get out of debt. Two years later, he was dead at the age of 44. In late 20th century, reparations activist Raymond Winbush located and interviewed descendants of Colonel Anderson in preparation for his 2003 book Should America Pay?. He reported that these descendants were "still angry at Jordan for not coming back" and that they "say that he should have been faithful and come back to the plantation to help out because he knew that the plantation was in such disrepair because of the Civil War."

== Legacy ==
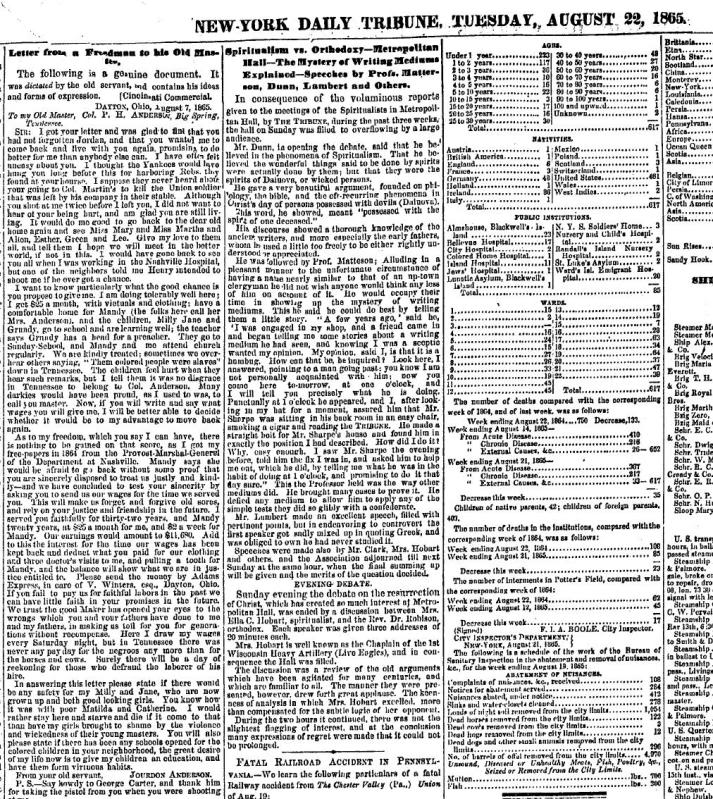
Newspaper print of Anderson's letter in the New-York Daily Tribune

Valentine Winters Anderson, Jordan Anderson's son, was a close friend and collaborator with Paul Laurence Dunbar, a noted African-American author. A character called "Jeremiah Anderson", who is asked by his former master to return to the plantation and refuses, appears in Dunbar's short story, "The Wisdom of Silence".

In 2012, Michael Johnson, a historian at Johns Hopkins University, investigated the people and places mentioned in order to verify the document's authenticity. He found that 1860 slave records named a Colonel P. H. Anderson in the right county, and that some of his slaves, although not referred to by name, matched the sexes and ages of those in the letter. Jordan Anderson, his wife, and children also appear in the 1870 census of Dayton; they are listed as black and born in Tennessee.

Genealogist Curt Dalton also found that the people mentioned in the letter are real. George Carter was a carpenter in Wilson County; "Miss Mary" and "Miss Martha" were Colonel Anderson's wife, Mary, and their daughter, Martha; and "Henry", who had plans to shoot Anderson if he ever got the chance, "was more than likely Colonel Patrick Henry Anderson's son, Patrick Henry Jr., whom everyone called Henry, and who would have been about 18 when Anderson left in 1864." The two daughters, "poor Matilda and Catherine", did not travel with Anderson to Ohio, and their fate is unknown; it is speculated that whatever befell them was fatal, or they were sold as slaves to other families before Anderson had been freed. "V. Winters" in the letter was the aforementioned Valentine Winters, a banker in Dayton, and founder of Winters Bank, for whom Anderson and his wife felt such respect that in 1870 they named one of their sons Valentine Winters Anderson.

In 2018, Laurence Fishburne gave a dramatic reading of the letter at Letters Live at The Town Hall in New York City.

== See also ==
- List of slaves
