= Leeville, Tennessee =

- Unincorporated community
- Interactive map of Leeville, Tennessee
- Coordinates: 36°11′27″N 86°25′03″W
- Country: United States
- State: Tennessee
- County: Wilson
- Elevation: 587 ft (179 m)
- Time zone: UTC-6 (Central (CST))
  - Summer (DST): UTC-5 (CDT)
- Area code: 615
- GNIS feature ID: 1290986

Leeville is an unincorporated community in Wilson County, in the U.S. state of Tennessee. It is centered just north of Interstate 40 and just west of Tennessee State Route 109.

== History ==
Leeville was platted in 1871, and named after Robert E. Lee (1807–1870), American Civil War Confederate general. A post office called Leeville was established in 1877, and remained in operation until 1904. Variant names were Kellys and Stringtown.
