= Big Spring, Wilson County, Tennessee =

Big Spring, Tennessee
- Ghost town
- Location within Tennessee
- Coordinates: 36°14′56″N 86°10′38″W
- Country: United States
- State: Tennessee
- County: Wilson
- Elevation: 538 ft (164 m)
- GNIS feature ID: 1312812

Big Spring is a ghost town in Wilson County, Tennessee, United States.

== Notable people ==
- Jourdon Anderson, American slave
