= Commerce, Tennessee =

- Unincorporated community
- Location within Tennessee Location within the United States
- Coordinates: 36°08′24″N 86°06′12″W
- Country: United States
- State: Tennessee
- County: Wilson
- Elevation: 620 ft (190 m)
- Time zone: UTC-6 (Central (CST))
  - Summer (DST): UTC-5 (CDT)
- Area code: 615
- GNIS feature ID: 1281040

Commerce is an unincorporated community in Wilson County, Tennessee, United States. Commerce is located on Commerce Road 11.5 miles (18.5 km) east-southeast of Lebanon.

== History ==
Commerce was platted in 1822. A post office called Commerce was established in 1831, and remained in operation until 1903.

The Bailey Graveyard, which is listed on the National Register of Historic Places, is located in Commerce.
