= LaGuardo, Tennessee =

- Unincorporated community
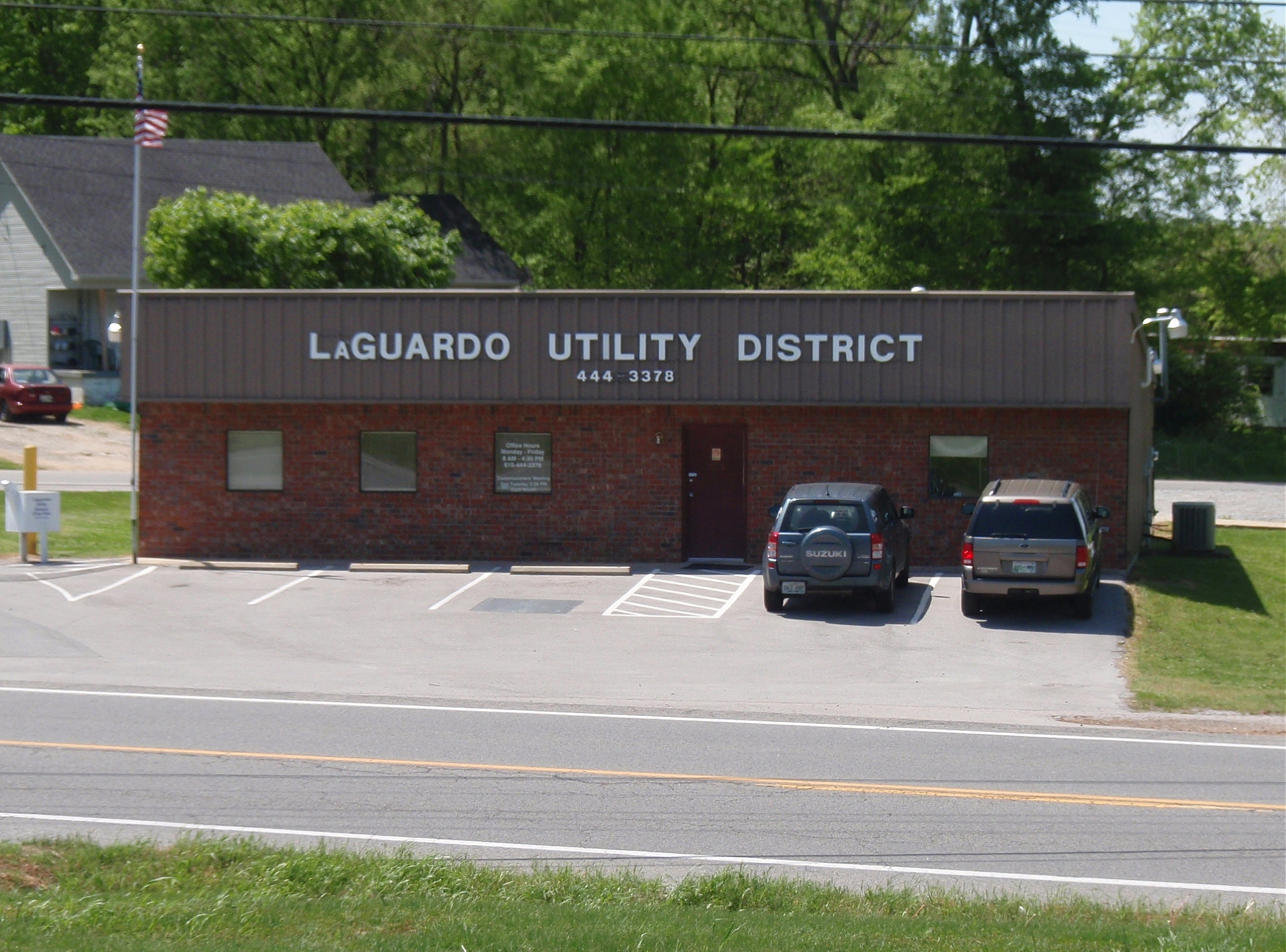
- LaGuardo Utility Building as seen from State Route 109

- Coordinates: 36°17′47″N 86°26′37″W
- Country: United States
- State: Tennessee
- County: Wilson
- Elevation: 499 ft (152 m)
- Time zone: UTC-6 (Central (CST))
  - Summer (DST): UTC-5 (CDT)
- Area code: 615
- GNIS feature ID: 1306658

LaGuardo is an unincorporated community in Wilson County, Tennessee. It is located along Tennessee State Route 109. The community has a handful of stores, utility district building and churches.

== History ==
LaGuardo means "watchdog." An early spelling of the community was "Lagad" or "Lagado." In 1950 the center of the community was moved from Saundersville Road and Woods Ferry road to a mile southeast. This was due to damming of Old Hickory Lake and the increasing prominence of State Route 109.

== Notable deaths ==
- Uncle Jimmy Thompson, old-time fiddle player, died February 17, 1931

== Gallery ==
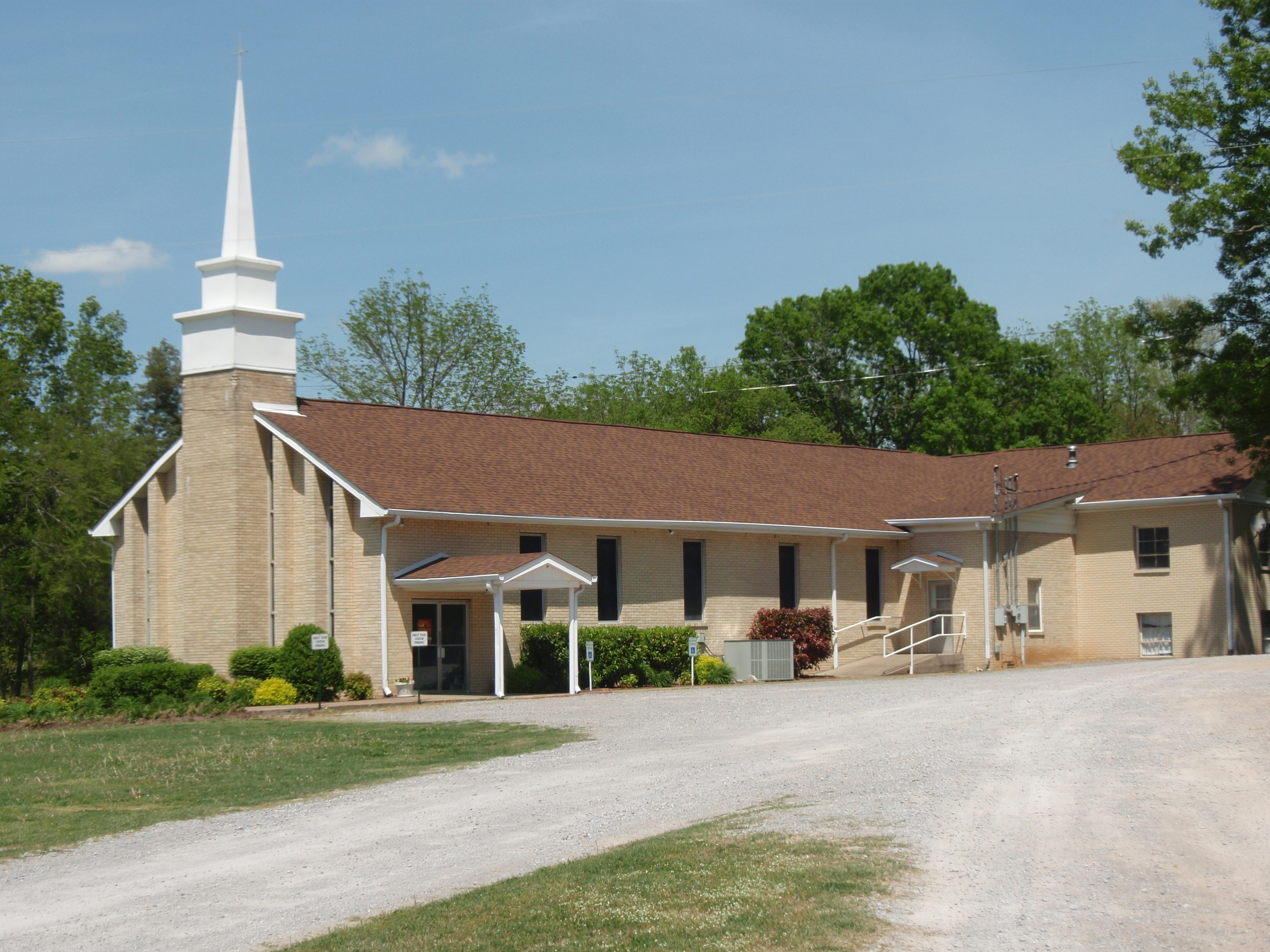
Iglesia Adventista del Septimo Dia ( Seventh Day Adventist Church) as seen from State Route 109
