= Wilson Central High School =

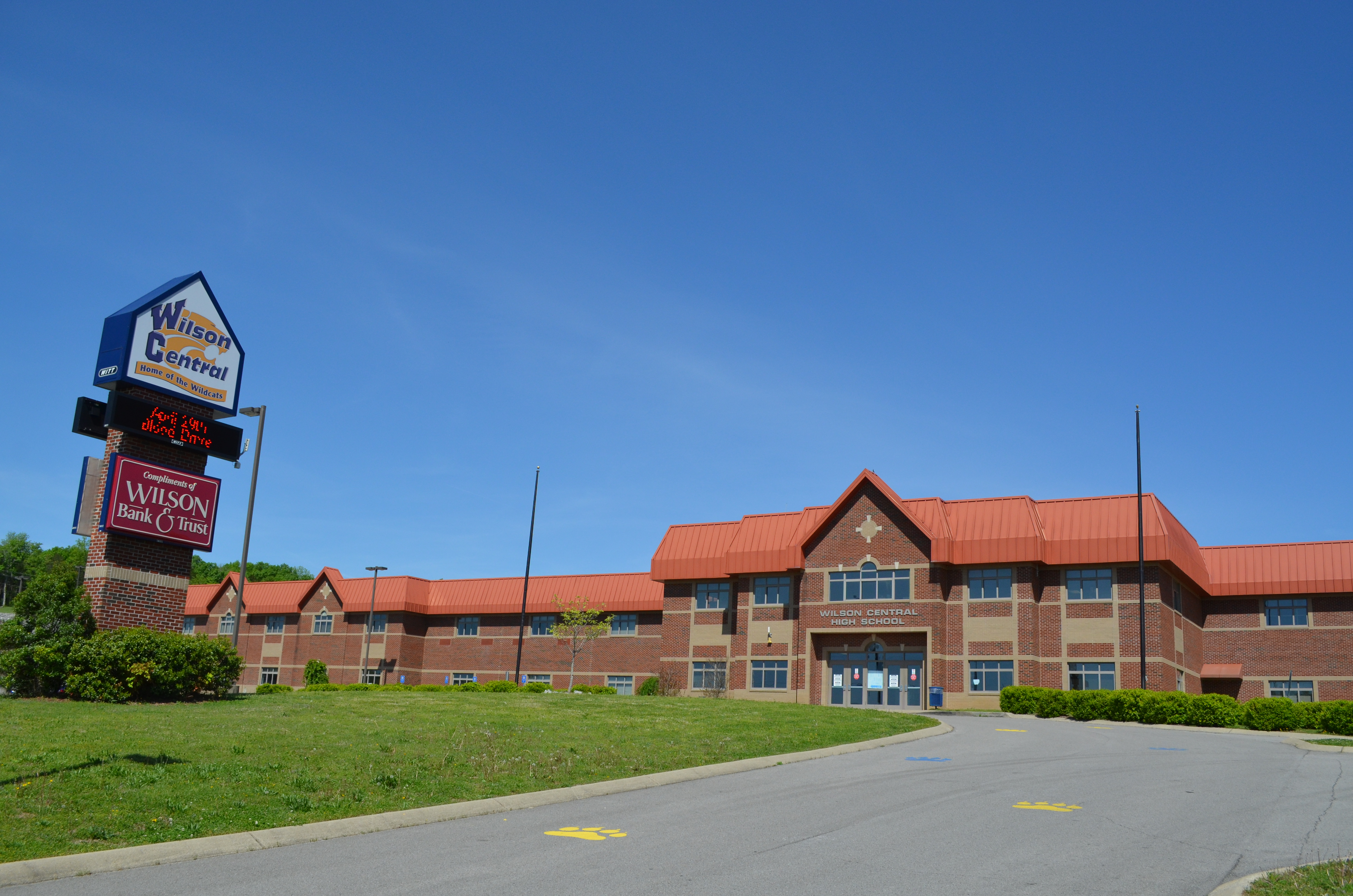

Location
- 419 Wildcat Way; Lebanon, Tennessee 37087; United States; 36°7′59″N 86°23′41″W

Information
- Type: Public grades 9-12
- Motto: Where Challenge Heightens Success
- Principal: Jennifer Ankney
- Teaching staff: 88.53 (FTE)
- Enrollment: 1,625 (2023-2024)
- Student to teacher ratio: 18.36
- Colors: Blue and gold
- Nickname: Wildcats
- Website: wchs.wcschools.com

Wilson Central High School is a Grade 9–12 high school located in Lebanon, Tennessee. It is part of the Wilson County School System.

It serves: portions of Lebanon, all of Rural Hill, all of Gladeville, and portions of Mount Juliet south of Interstate 40.

== Demographics ==
The demographic breakdown of the 17,879 students enrolled in 2016–2017 was:

- Male - 51.71%
- Female - 48.29%
- Asian - 2.3%
- Black - 8.4%
- Hispanic - 5.6%
- White - 82.0%
- Multiracial - 1.5%

== Athletics ==
Wilson Central won 2006 and 2008 3A state girls basketball championship. Wilson Central is also home of the 2015 TSSAA softball state champions.

Wilson Central Wrestling is the pre-eminent wrestling program in the Midstate. The Wilson Central wrestling program is coached by John Kramer. 2019–20 season: 28–1, district, region dual and individual region champions State runner up at State Duals State runner up at individual State 8 Individual State Medalists: 1 state champ (Hunter Borders), 2 runner ups 2 fourths, a 5th and 2 6th-place finishes at individual state
