= Tuckers Crossroads, Tennessee =

- Unincorporated community
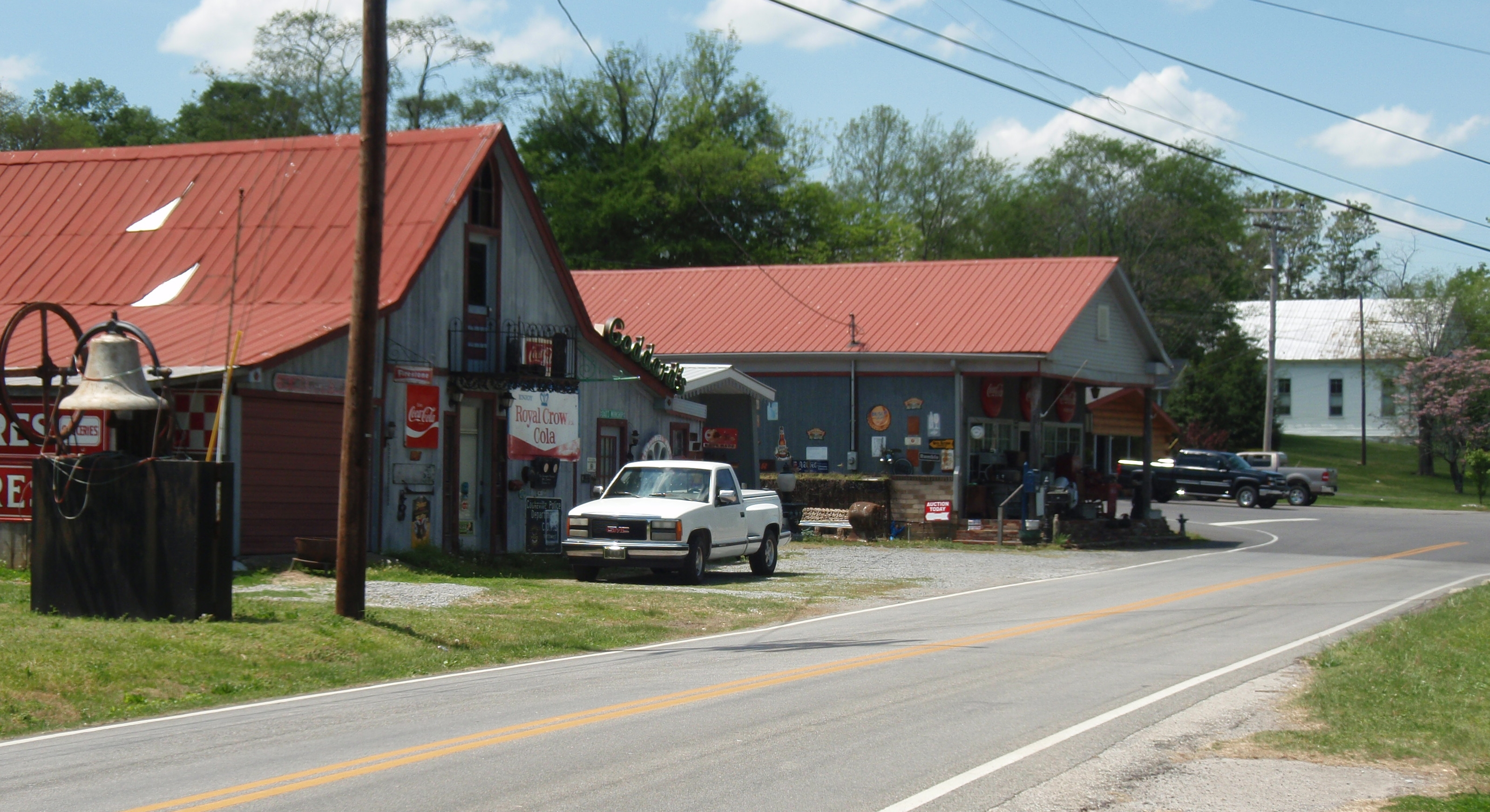
- Private antique collection along State Route 141 in Tuckers Crossroads.
- Interactive map of Tuckers Crossroads, Tennessee
- Coordinates: 36°11′56″N 86°10′26″W
- Country: United States
- State: Tennessee
- County: Wilson

Area
  - Total: 2.85 sq mi (7.38 km^{2})
  - Land: 2.85 sq mi (7.38 km^{2})
  - Water: 0 sq mi (0.00 km^{2})
- Elevation: 548 ft (167 m)

Population (2020)
  - Total: 263
  - Density: 92.3/sq mi (35.64/km^{2})
- Time zone: UTC-6 (Central (CST))
  - Summer (DST): UTC-5 (CDT)
- Area code: 615
- GNIS feature ID: 1304185

Tuckers Crossroads is an unincorporated community in Wilson County, Tennessee, United States. It is located at the intersection of Tennessee State Route 141, Linwood Road, and Big Springs Road. The community has one hair salon, one gas station (formerly known as the Linwood BP but recently bought by Marathon), two community softball fields, an elementary and middle school, three churches, a Dollar General, many farms (including the beef cattle of Neal Farms) and rural residential housing.

== Demographics ==
Historical population
Census	Pop.	Note	%±
2020	263		—
U.S. Decennial Census
