= Wilson County, Tennessee =

County in Tennessee, United States

- County
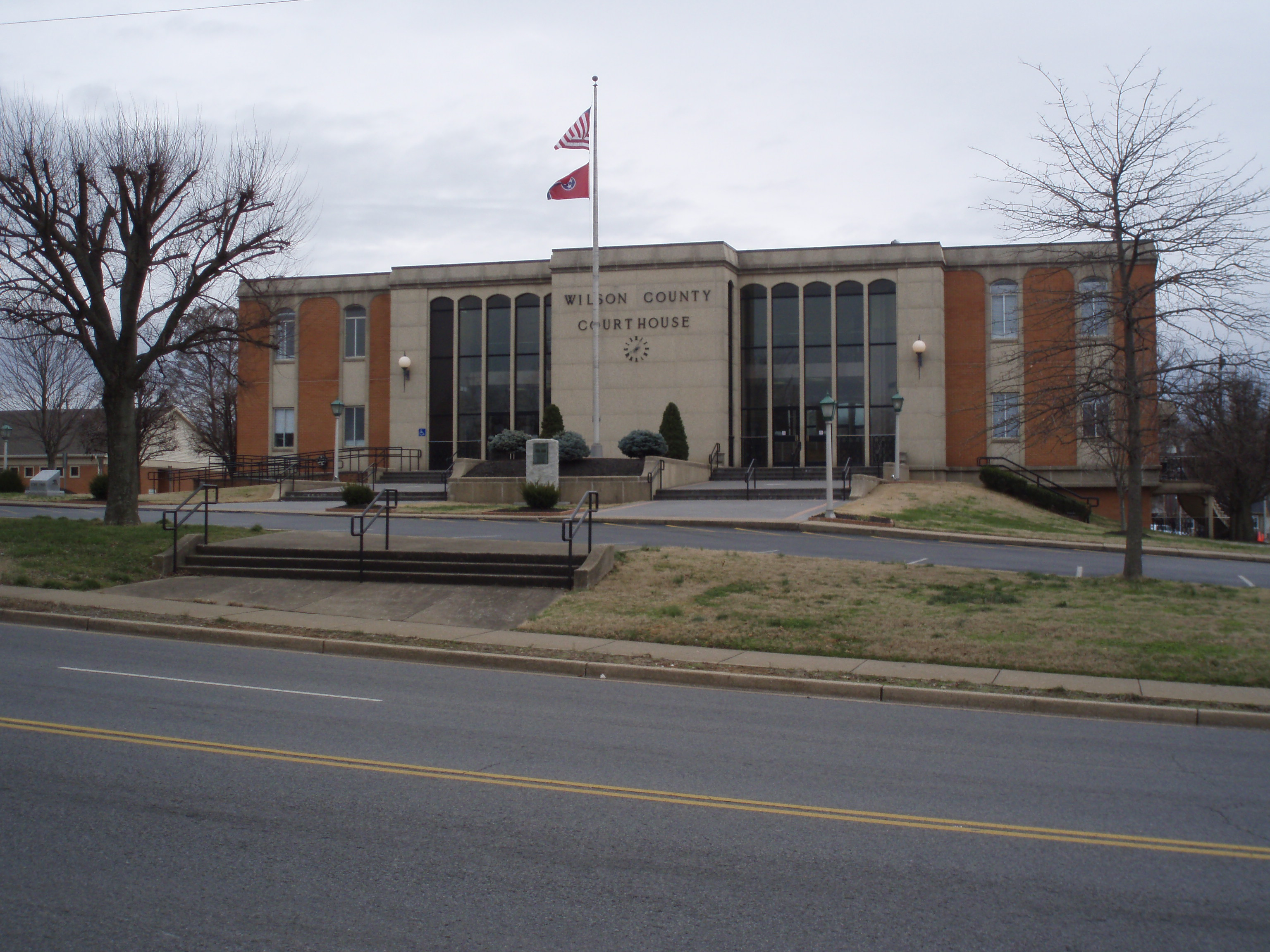
- Wilson County Courthouse in Lebanon

- Seal

- Location within the U.S. state of Tennessee
- Coordinates: 36°10′N 86°18′W
- Country: United States
- State: Tennessee
- Founded: October 26, 1799
- Named for: David Wilson, early statesman
- Seat: Lebanon
- Largest city: Mt. Juliet

Government
  - Mayor: Randall Hutto (R)

Area
  - Total: 583 sq mi (1,510 km^{2})
  - Land: 571 sq mi (1,480 km^{2})
  - Water: 12 sq mi (31 km^{2}) 2.1%

Population (2020)
  - Total: 147,737
  - Estimate (2025): 175,033 ▲
  - Density: 259/sq mi (99.9/km^{2})
- Time zone: UTC−6 (Central)
  - Summer (DST): UTC−5 (CDT)
- Area code: 615, 629
- Congressional districts: 5th, 6th
- Website: www.wilsoncountytn.gov

Wilson County is a county in the U.S. state of Tennessee. It is in Middle Tennessee. As of the 2020 census, the population was 147,737. Its county seat is Lebanon. The largest city is Mt. Juliet. Wilson County is part of the Nashville metropolitan area.

== History ==
Wilson County was created in 1799 from a portion of Sumner County, and named for Major David Wilson, a Revolutionary War veteran and statesman. The county remained predominantly agrarian throughout the 19th century. The arrival of the railroad after the Civil War boosted the county's timber sector, and several large factories were constructed in the county during the early 20th century.

Wilson County was the site of an important saltpeter mine. Saltpeter, the main ingredient of gunpowder, was obtained by leaching the earth from Valley Cave. Valley Cave is near Statesville. The many saltpeter hoppers still inside the cave indicate that this was a large mining operation. These saltpeter vats may date from the War of 1812 mining era or the Civil War mining era, or perhaps both. Further research is needed to determine when this mine was active.

== Geography ==
According to the U.S. Census Bureau, the county has a total area of 583 square miles (1,510 km^{2}), of which 571 square miles (1,480 km^{2}) is land and 12 square miles (31 km^{2}) (2.1%) is water. The Cumberland River flows along the county's northern border with Trousdale and Sumner counties. This section of the river is part of Old Hickory Lake. Several streams in the western part of the county are part of the Stones River basin.

Wilson County is home to a large concentration of cedar glades, a unique ecosystem where the soil is too rocky or shallow for trees to grow. Many of these glades are found in Cedars of Lebanon State Park.

=== Adjacent counties ===
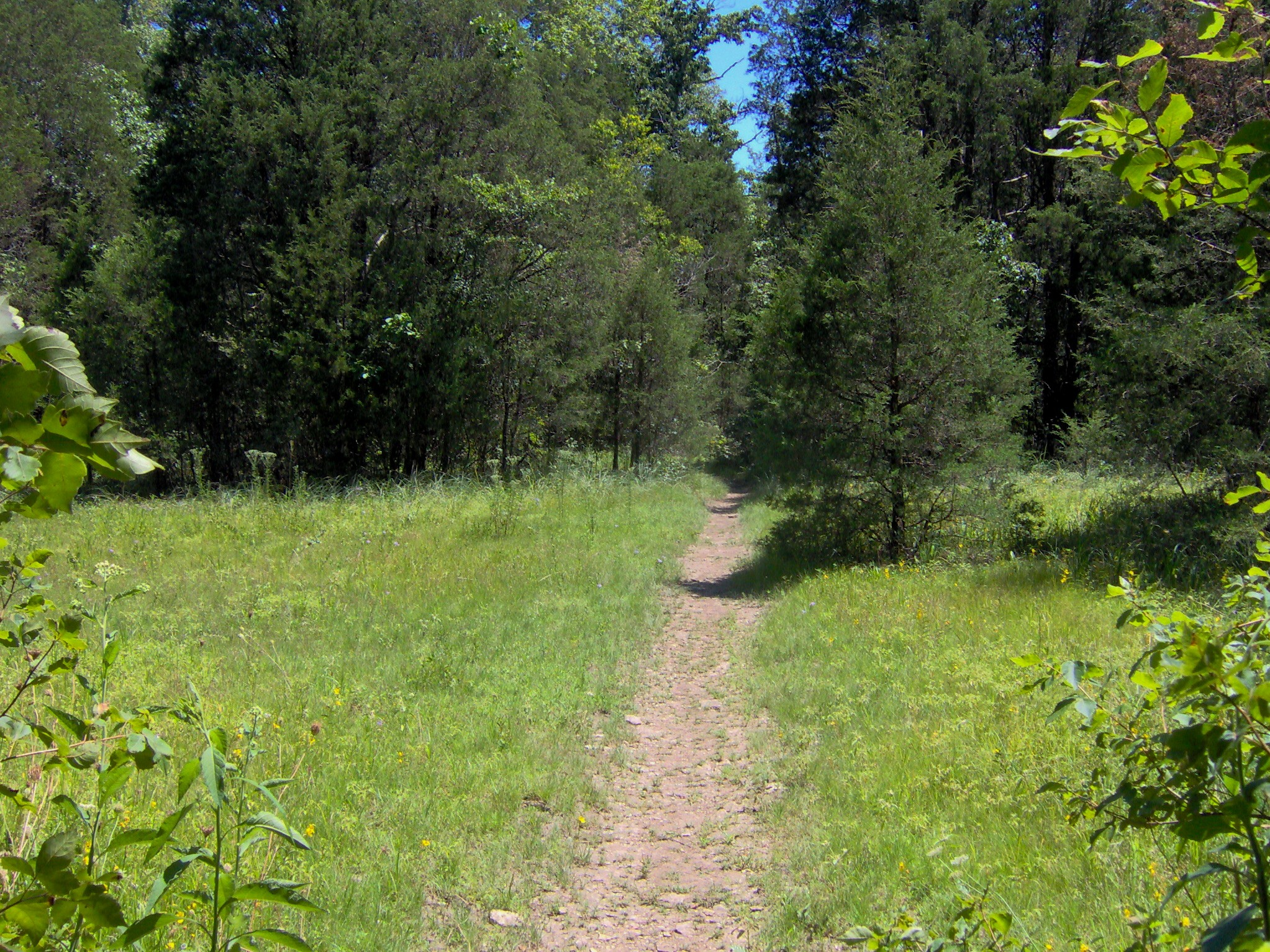
Cedar glade in Wilson County

- Trousdale County (north)
- Smith County (northeast)
- DeKalb County (east)
- Cannon County (southeast)
- Rutherford County (south)
- Davidson County (west)
- Sumner County (northwest)

=== State protected areas ===
- Cedars of Lebanon State Forest
- Cedars of Lebanon State Park
- Couchville Cedar Glade State Natural Area (part)
- Gattinger's Cedar Glade and Barrens State Natural Area (part)
- John and Hester Land Cedar Glades State Natural Area
- Old Hickory Wildlife Management Area (part)
- Percy Priest Wildlife Management Area (part)
- Vesta Cedar Glade State Natural Area
- Vine Cedar Glade State Natural Area

=== Major highways ===
- I-40
- I-840
- US 70
- US 70N
- US 70 Bus.
- US 231
- SR 96
- SR 109
- SR 141
- SR 171
- SR 265
- SR 266
- SR 267
- SR 452

== Demographics ==
Historical population
Census	Pop.	Note	%±
1800	3,261		—
1810	11,952		266.5%
1820	18,730		56.7%
1830	25,472		36.0%
1840	24,460		−4.0%
1850	27,443		12.2%
1860	26,072		−5.0%
1870	25,881		−0.7%
1880	28,747		11.1%
1890	27,148		−5.6%
1900	27,078		−0.3%
1910	25,394		−6.2%
1920	26,241		3.3%
1930	23,929		−8.8%
1940	25,267		5.6%
1950	26,318		4.2%
1960	27,668		5.1%
1970	36,999		33.7%
1980	56,064		51.5%
1990	67,675		20.7%
2000	88,809		31.2%
2010	113,993		28.4%
2020	147,737		29.6%
2025 (est.)	175,033	▲	18.5%
U.S. Decennial Census; 1790-1960 1900-1990; 1990-2000 2010-2020

=== Racial and ethnic composition ===
Wilson County, Tennessee – Racial and ethnic composition Note: the US Census treats Hispanic/Latino as an ethnic category. This table excludes Latinos from the racial categories and assigns them to a separate category. Hispanics/Latinos may be of any race.
Race / Ethnicity (NH = Non-Hispanic)	Pop 1980	Pop 1990	Pop 2000	Pop 2010	Pop 2020	% 1980	% 1990	% 2000	% 2010	% 2020
White alone (NH)	50,704	62,266	80,638	99,717	118,889	90.44%	92.01%	90.80%	87.48%	80.47%
Black or African American alone (NH)	4,837	4,589	5,545	7,234	10,099	8.63%	6.78%	6.24%	6.35%	6.84%
Native American or Alaska Native alone (NH)	67	178	276	353	405	0.12%	0.26%	0.31%	0.31%	0.27%
Asian alone (NH)	130	252	419	1,259	3,086	0.23%	0.37%	0.47%	1.10%	2.09%
Native Hawaiian or Pacific Islander alone (NH)	x	x	21	34	44	x	x	0.02%	0.03%	0.03%
Other race alone (NH)	45	4	49	126	602	0.08%	0.01%	0.06%	0.11%	0.41%
Mixed race or Multiracial (NH)	x	x	734	1,579	6,237	x	x	0.83%	1.39%	4.22%
Hispanic or Latino (any race)	281	386	1,127	3,691	8,375	0.50%	0.57%	1.27%	3.24%	5.67%
Total	56,064	67,675	88,809	113,993	147,737	100.00%	100.00%	100.00%	100.00%	100.00%

=== 2020 census ===
As of the 2020 census, there were 147,737 people, 55,074 households, and 40,874 families residing in the county. The median age was 40.1 years; 23.6% of residents were under the age of 18 and 16.2% of residents were 65 years of age or older. For every 100 females there were 95.5 males, and for every 100 females age 18 and over there were 93.2 males age 18 and over.

The racial makeup of the county was 81.8% White, 6.9% Black or African American, 0.4% American Indian and Alaska Native, 2.1% Asian, <0.1% Native Hawaiian and Pacific Islander, 2.6% from some other race, and 6.2% from two or more races. Hispanic or Latino residents of any race comprised 5.7% of the population.

64.8% of residents lived in urban areas, while 35.2% lived in rural areas.

Of the 55,074 households in the county, 34.7% had children under the age of 18 living in them. Of all households, 57.6% were married-couple households, 14.2% were households with a male householder and no spouse or partner present, and 22.4% were households with a female householder and no spouse or partner present. About 21.2% of all households were made up of individuals and 8.8% had someone living alone who was 65 years of age or older. There were 58,152 housing units, of which 5.3% were vacant. Among occupied housing units, 75.1% were owner-occupied and 24.9% were renter-occupied. The homeowner vacancy rate was 1.2% and the rental vacancy rate was 7.3%.

=== 2010 census ===
As of the census of 2010, there were 113,993 people, 42,563 households, and 32,177 families living in the county. The population density was 199.64 persons per square mile (77.08 persons/km^{2}). The housing unit density was 74.54 units per square mile (28.78 units/km^{2}). The racial makeup of the county was 89.30% White, 6.40% African American, 1.12% Asian, 0.35% Native American, 0.04% Pacific Islander, and 1.46% from two or more races. Those of Hispanic or Latino origins constituted 3.24% of the population.

Of all of the households, 33.22% had children under the age of 18 living in them, 60.08% were married couples living together, 4.33% had a male householder with no wife present, 11.19% had a female householder with no husband present, and 24.40% were non-families. 19.86% of households were one person and 7.29% were one person aged 65 or older. The average household size was 2.65 and the average family size was 3.03.

The age distribution was 25.06% under the age of 18, 62.78% ages 18 to 64, and 12.17% age 65 and older. The median age was 39.3 years. 51.02% of the population were females and 48.98% were males.

The median household income was $60,678, and the median family income was $70,092. Males had a median income of $49,293 versus $36,419 for females. The per capita income for the county was $27,814. About 5.6% of families and 7.6% of the population were below the poverty line, including 9.1% of those under the age of 18 and 8.1% of those age 65 or older.

=== 2000 census ===
At the 2000 census there were 88,809 people, 32,798 households, and 25,582 families living in the county. The population density was 156 people per square mile (60 people/km^{2}). There were 34,921 housing units at an average density of 61 units per square mile (24/km^{2}). The racial makeup of the county was 91.50% White, 6.26% Black or African American, 0.32% Native American, 0.48% Asian, 0.03% Pacific Islander, 0.48% from other races, and 0.92% from two or more races. 1.27% of the population were Hispanic or Latino of any race.

Of the 32,798 households 37.20% had children under the age of 18 living with them, 64.20% were married couples living together, 10.10% had a female householder with no husband present, and 22.00% were non-families. 18.10% of households were one person and 6.10% were one person aged 65 or older. The average household size was 2.67 and the average family size was 3.03.

The age distribution was 26.20% under the age of 18, 7.70% from 18 to 24, 31.70% from 25 to 44, 24.70% from 45 to 64, and 9.70% 65 or older. The median age was 36 years. For every 100 females, there were 97.40 males. For every 100 females age 18 and over, there were 94.80 males.

The median household income was $50,140 and the median family income was $56,650. Males had a median income of $39,848 versus $26,794 for females. The per capita income for the county was $22,739. About 4.60% of families and 6.70% of the population were below the poverty line, including 7.80% of those under age 18 and 11.50% of those age 65 or over.

== Education ==
Wilson County Schools oversees 22 public schools, including 2 adult education centers and a technical education center. The county has five high schools: Mount Juliet High School, Lebanon High School, Wilson Central High School, Green Hill High School, and Watertown High School.

Lebanon Special School District (LSSD) serves most of Lebanon and some unincorporated areas for K-8, though some parts of Lebanon are with Wilson County schools for all years K-12. Wilson County Schools operates the high schools that serve the LSSD territory.

Cumberland University is located in Lebanon.

== Communities ==
=== Cities ===
- Mt. Juliet (largest city)
- Lebanon (county seat)

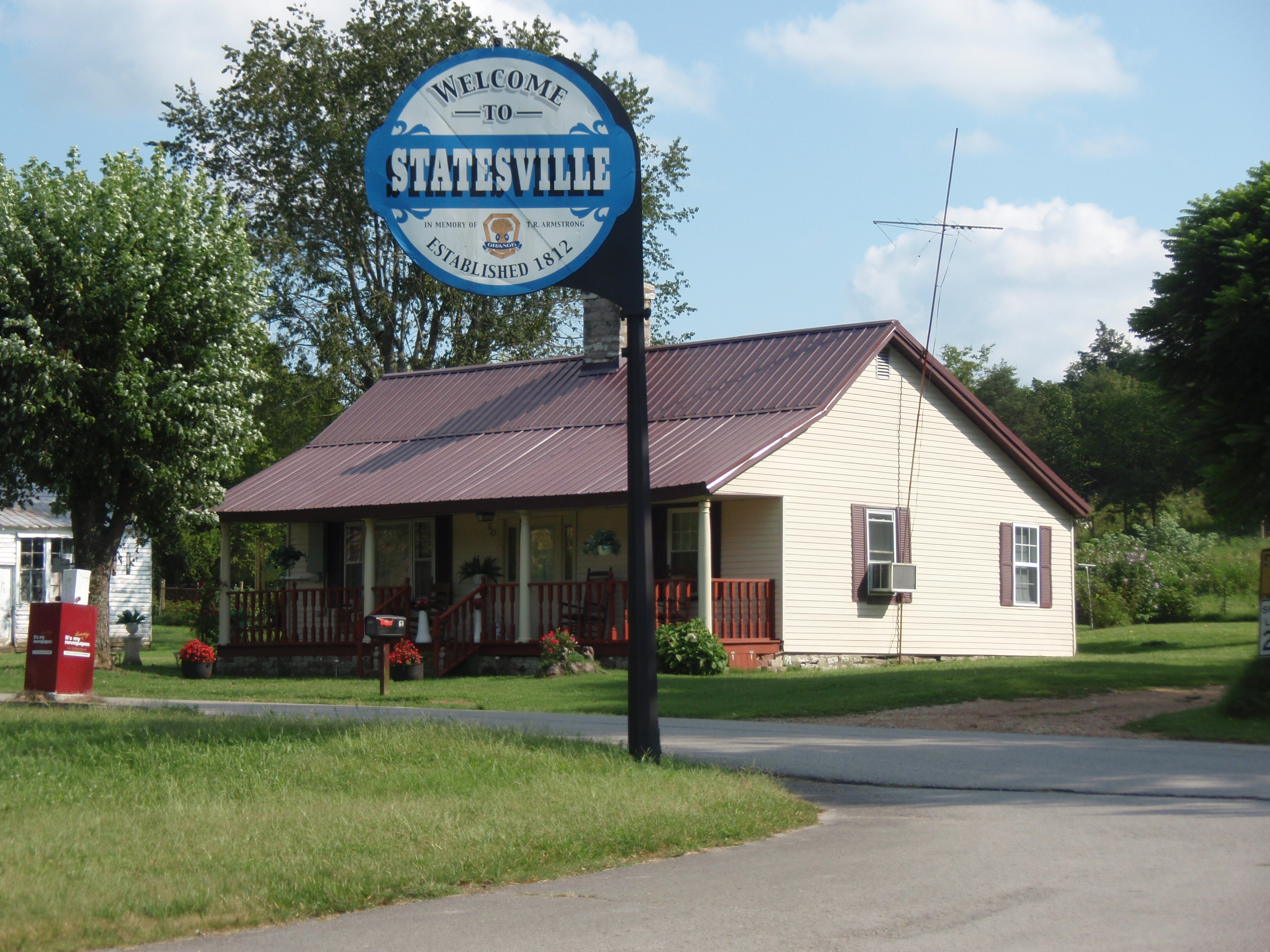
Statesville

=== Town ===
- Watertown

=== Census-designated places ===
- Gladeville
- Green Hill
- Norene
- Rural Hill
- Statesville
- Tuckers Crossroads

=== Other unincorporated communities ===
- Belinda City
- Cainsville
- Cedar Grove
- Cherry Valley
- Commerce
- Doaks Crossroads
- Egan
- Greenvale
- LaGuardo
- Leeville
- Liberty Hill
- Martha
- Suggs Creek
- Tater Peeler
- Taylorsville
- Vine

=== Former community ===
- Big Spring

== Notable people ==
- Jordan Anderson (1825–1907) – author of Letter from a Freedman to His Old Master (1865)
- Casey Atwood (b. 1980) – NASCAR driver
- Adrian Belew (b. 1949) – musical artist
- Charlie Daniels (1936–2020) – musical artist
- Dan Evins (1935–2012) – businessman and founder of the Cracker Barrel Old Country Store
- Bobby Hamilton (1957–2007) – NASCAR driver
- Erika Jo (b. 1986) – musical artist
- Chloe Kohanski – musical artist
- Dixon Lanier Merritt (1879–1972) – newspaper editor, historian, poet
- John J. Pettus (1813–1867) – 20th and 23rd governor of Mississippi
- John S. Roane (1817–1867) – 4th governor of Arkansas
- David P. Sartor (b. 1956) – classical composer
- Gretchen Wilson (b. 1973) – musical artist
- Ross Winn (1871–1912) – writer

== Politics ==
Like the rest of Nashville's suburbs, Wilson County is a Republican stronghold. It has not been won by a Democratic presidential candidate since 1992. After going to George W. Bush by six points in 2000, Wilson County dramatically shifted to the right. Since 2004, Republicans have won the county by at least a 30-point margin of victory each time. 2016 marked the worst performance ever by a Democratic presidential candidate in the county, with Donald Trump winning it by 44 points.

United States presidential election results for Wilson County, Tennessee
Year	Republican		Democratic		Third party(ies)	
Year	No.	%	No.	%	No.	%
1880	1,227	28.74%	2,918	68.34%	125	2.93%
1884	1,234	35.20%	2,191	62.49%	81	2.31%
1888	1,676	38.31%	2,518	57.55%	181	4.14%
1892	1,142	27.94%	2,523	61.72%	423	10.35%
1896	1,568	31.11%	3,436	68.17%	36	0.71%
1900	1,061	27.86%	2,674	70.20%	74	1.94%
1904	966	28.52%	2,386	70.45%	35	1.03%
1908	902	28.95%	2,212	70.99%	2	0.06%
1912	682	20.64%	2,325	70.35%	298	9.02%
1916	841	24.91%	2,535	75.09%	0	0.00%
1920	1,532	41.45%	2,160	58.44%	4	0.11%
1924	580	21.85%	2,043	76.95%	32	1.21%
1928	1,049	39.07%	1,629	60.67%	7	0.26%
1932	567	17.19%	2,713	82.26%	18	0.55%
1936	534	14.65%	3,108	85.27%	3	0.08%
1940	655	17.79%	3,020	82.04%	6	0.16%
1944	942	23.03%	3,148	76.97%	0	0.00%
1948	854	18.17%	3,133	66.67%	712	15.15%
1952	2,449	32.57%	5,070	67.43%	0	0.00%
1956	2,266	30.04%	5,221	69.21%	57	0.76%
1960	3,383	40.77%	4,857	58.54%	57	0.69%
1964	2,707	30.16%	6,267	69.84%	0	0.00%
1968	2,736	24.21%	2,916	25.81%	5,648	49.98%
1972	6,486	65.77%	3,096	31.40%	279	2.83%
1976	4,696	30.57%	10,537	68.59%	129	0.84%
1980	7,535	39.09%	11,248	58.36%	491	2.55%
1984	12,858	59.95%	8,433	39.32%	158	0.74%
1988	13,317	61.11%	8,360	38.36%	116	0.53%
1992	12,061	40.33%	13,861	46.35%	3,981	13.31%
1996	13,817	46.77%	13,655	46.22%	2,071	7.01%
2000	18,844	52.47%	16,561	46.11%	511	1.42%
2004	28,924	65.07%	15,277	34.37%	251	0.56%
2008	34,595	67.62%	15,886	31.05%	678	1.33%
2012	36,109	69.98%	14,695	28.48%	793	1.54%
2016	39,406	69.46%	14,385	25.36%	2,943	5.19%
2020	50,296	67.67%	22,254	29.94%	1,780	2.39%
2024	56,425	69.44%	23,855	29.36%	974	1.20%

== See also ==
- National Register of Historic Places listings in Wilson County, Tennessee
