= Rural Hill, Tennessee =

- CDP
- Location within Tennessee Location within the United States
- Coordinates: 36°7′7″N 86°31′8″W
- Country: United States
- State: Tennessee
- County: Wilson

Area
  - Total: 4.07 sq mi (10.55 km^{2})
  - Land: 4.06 sq mi (10.51 km^{2})
  - Water: 0.015 sq mi (0.04 km^{2})
- Elevation: 581 ft (177 m)

Population (2020)
  - Total: 2,047
  - Density: 504.2/sq mi (194.68/km^{2})
- Time zone: UTC-6 (Central (CST))
  - Summer (DST): UTC-5 (CDT)
- ZIP code: 37076;37122
- Area code: 615
- FIPS code: 47-65642
- GNIS feature ID: 1312881

Rural Hill is a census-designated place (CDP) in Wilson County, Tennessee. The population was 2,132 at the 2010 census.

== Geography ==
Rural Hill is located at 36°7′7″N 86°31′8″W (36.118696, -86.518771).

According to the United States Census Bureau, the CDP has a total area of 3.8 square miles (9.8 km^{2}), of which 3.8 square miles (9.8 km^{2}) is land and 0.02 square miles (0.052 km^{2}) (0.39%) is water.

== Demographics ==
Historical population
Census	Pop.	Note	%±
2010	2,132		—
2020	2,047		−4.0%
U.S. Decennial Census

As of the census of 2000, there were 2,032 people, 689 households, and 622 families residing in the CDP. The population density was 527.7 inhabitants per square mile (203.7/km^{2}). There were 697 housing units at an average density of 181.0 per square mile (69.9/km^{2}). The racial makeup of the CDP was 96.16% White, 1.38% African American, 0.10% Native American, 0.69% Asian, 0.10% Pacific Islander, 0.34% from other races, and 1.23% from two or more races. Hispanic or Latino of any race were 1.72% of the population.

There were 689 households, out of which 44.6% had children under the age of 18 living with them, 84.2% were married couples living together, 4.2% had a female householder with no husband present, and 9.7% were non-families. 6.7% of all households were made up of individuals, and 2.3% had someone living alone who was 65 years of age or older. The average household size was 2.95 and the average family size was 3.10.

In the CDP, the population was spread out, with 28.6% under the age of 18, 4.4% from 18 to 24, 34.2% from 25 to 44, 26.9% from 45 to 64, and 5.9% who were 65 years of age or older. The median age was 38 years. For every 100 females, there were 103.6 males. For every 100 females age 18 and over, there were 98.2 males.

The median income for a household in the CDP was $80,346, and the median income for a family was $83,005. Males had a median income of $54,348 versus $31,848 for females. The per capita income for the community was $28,571. None of the families and 0.5% of the population were living below the poverty line, including no under eighteens and 5.6% of those over 64.

== History ==
The community is sometimes spelled "Ruralhill" in official records. It was located four miles west of Gladeville on Stewart Ferry Pike. On February 9, 1833, A.B. Curry was made the postmaster of the first post office established at Rural Hill, making it one of the earliest post offices in Wilson County. From the time it was opened, the post office had one interruption of service of less than one year before closing in 1903. Rural Hill is mentioned as having held a debate between the candidates for the constitutional convention held in 1834. Rural Hill is also mentioned at least twice in the Official Records of the War of the Rebellion, Series I Volume 20 mentions two skirmishes between Union patrols and advanced confederate outposts from the Confederate Army of Tennessee, then under the command of Gen. Braxton Bragg and encamped in Murfreesboro. On November 18, 1862, and again on December 20, Union scouting met Confederate resistance at the then important cross roads of Rural Hill, which was the first town east of the Stones River past Stewart's Ferry. These skirmishes both preceded the Union advance from Nashville to Murfreesboro that culminated in the Battle of Stones River.

== Education ==
It is a part of Wilson County Schools.

Most areas are zoned to Rutland Elementary School though some are zoned to Gladeville Elementary School. It is zoned to Gladeville Middle School, and Wilson Central High School.
