= Gladeville, Tennessee =

- Unincorporated community
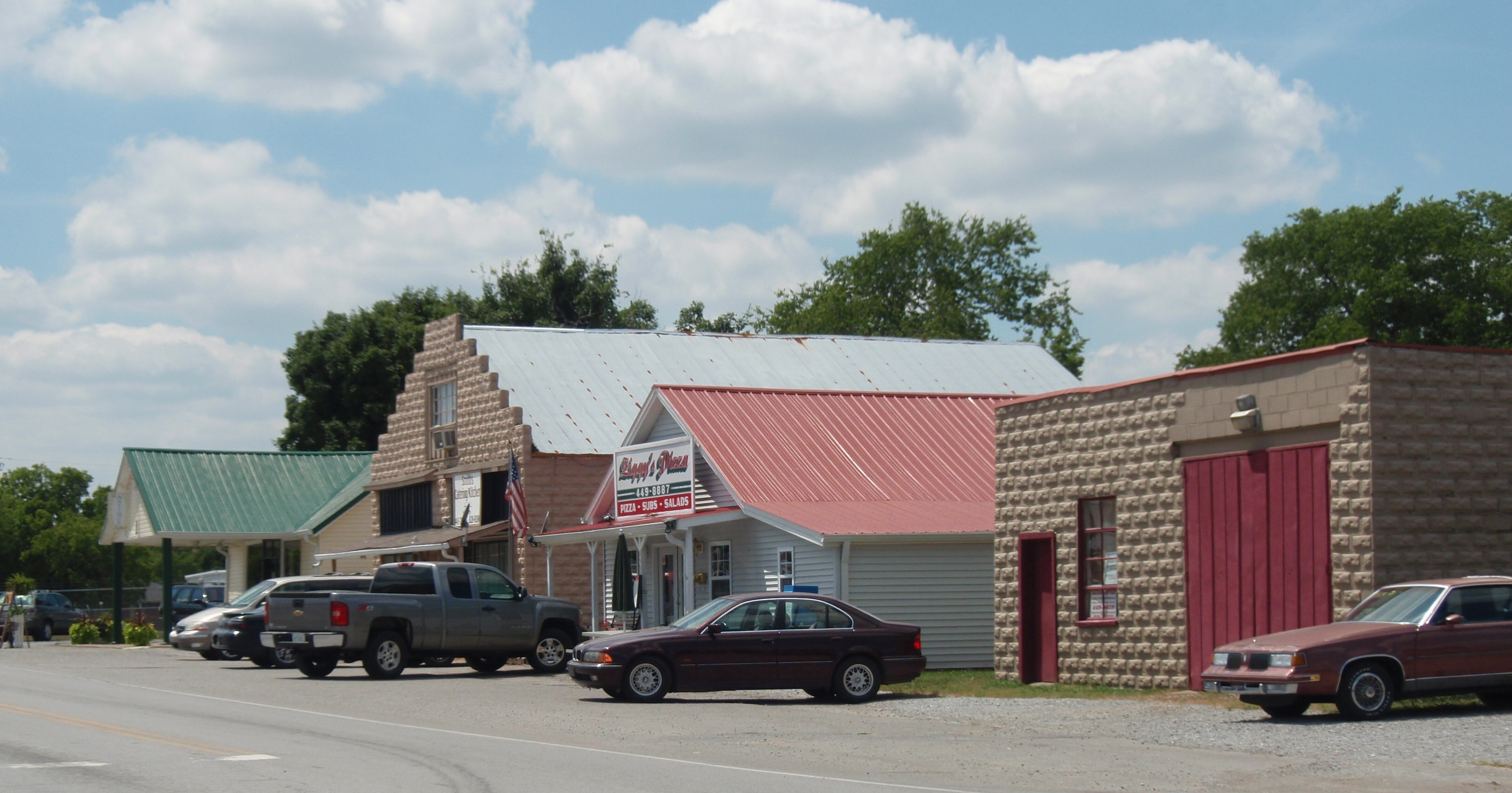
- Shops along Stewarts Ferry Pike in Gladeville
- Nickname: The Glade
- Interactive map of Gladeville, Tennessee
- Coordinates: 36°06′45″N 86°24′59″W
- Country: United States
- State: Tennessee
- County: Wilson

Area
  - Total: 4.53 sq mi (11.73 km^{2})
  - Land: 4.53 sq mi (11.73 km^{2})
  - Water: 0 sq mi (0.00 km^{2})
- Elevation: 597 ft (182 m)

Population (2020)
  - Total: 1,189
  - Density: 262.5/sq mi (101.37/km^{2})
- Time zone: UTC-6 (Central (CST))
  - Summer (DST): UTC-5 (CDT)
- Area code: 615
- GNIS feature ID: 1285481

Gladeville is an unincorporated community in Wilson County, Tennessee. The community is named for the surrounding cedar glades— a unique type of ecosystem that thrives in the thin or barren soil of south Wilson County. Gladeville is located just off Interstate 840 along Stewarts Ferry Pike, approximately 10 miles (16 km) southeast of Mt. Juliet.

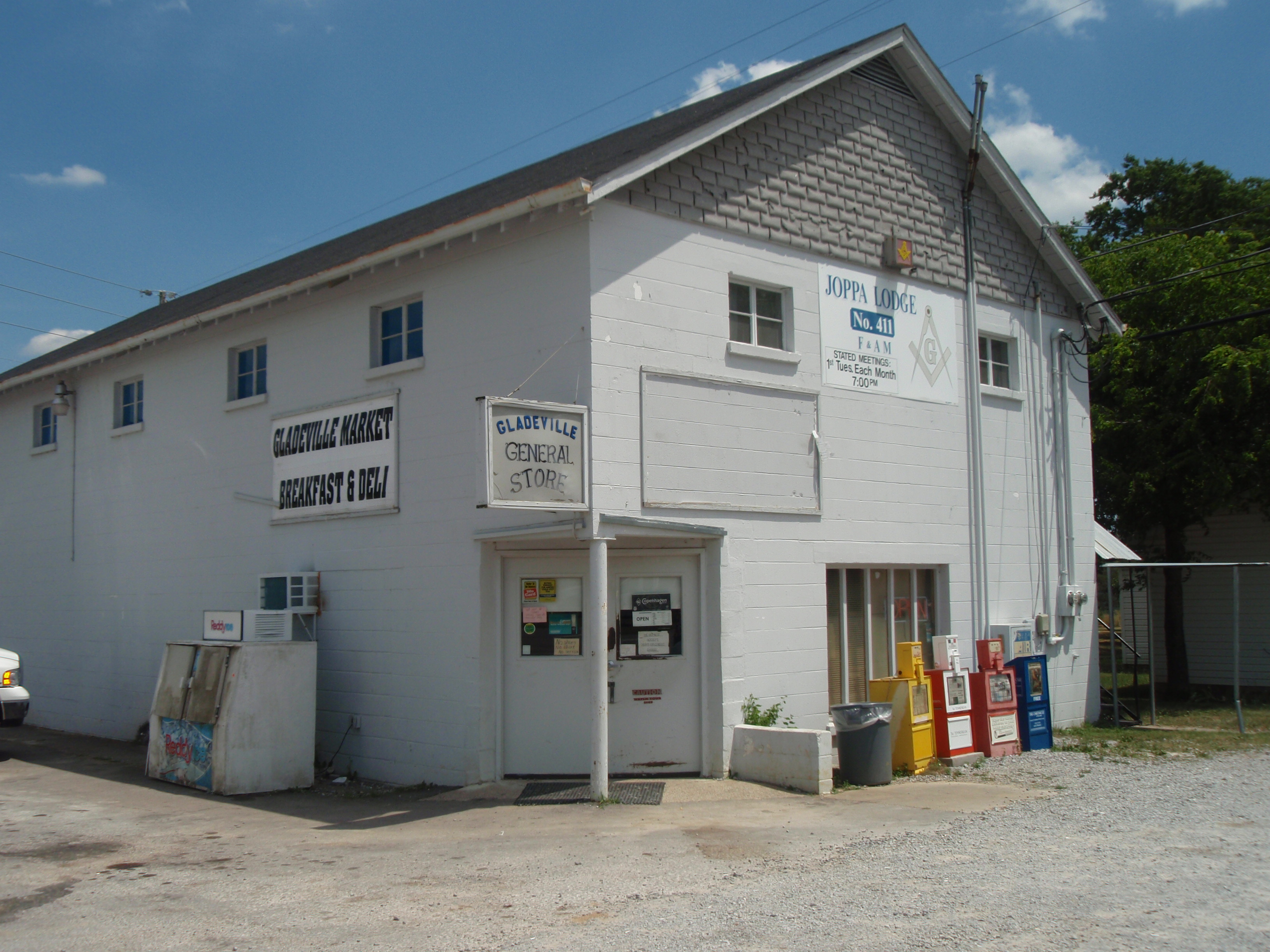
Gladeville Market at the intersection of Stewarts Ferry Pike and McCreary Road

Gladeville was founded in 1852 on land of Benjamin Hooker Jr. and grew steadily for several years, although the outbreak of the Civil War slowed its growth. The post office was established in 1855 with John M. Bland as the first postmaster. Notable Gladeville natives include Grand Ole Opry fiddler Sid Harkreader (1898–1988). The community is home to the Nashville Superspeedway.

Gladeville was formerly a regional softball hub in the 1980s and 1990s with many large tournaments being held in the spring and summer months. However, in the early 2000s a significant decrease in activity occurred and by the mid 2000s, activity ceased completely. The softball field has been used for various youth teams since, and is currently utilized by the Diamond Dawgs, which boasts 11U and 12U AAA traveling competitive baseball teams.

Gladeville has a small downtown area at the intersection of Gladeville Road & Stewarts Ferry Pike that features several restaurants and businesses.

The community was struck by an EF-1 tornado on the afternoon of November 18, 2017.

== Geography ==
=== Climate ===
Climate data for Gladeville, Tennessee (1991–2020)
Month	Jan	Feb	Mar	Apr	May	Jun	Jul	Aug	Sep	Oct	Nov	Dec	Year
Mean daily maximum °F (°C)	47.4 (8.6)	52.1 (11.2)	61.3 (16.3)	71.6 (22.0)	79.4 (26.3)	87.0 (30.6)	89.5 (31.9)	89.3 (31.8)	83.7 (28.7)	72.6 (22.6)	60.5 (15.8)	50.6 (10.3)	70.4 (21.3)
Daily mean °F (°C)	36.5 (2.5)	39.9 (4.4)	48.0 (8.9)	57.4 (14.1)	66.4 (19.1)	74.4 (23.6)	77.9 (25.5)	76.8 (24.9)	70.0 (21.1)	58.1 (14.5)	46.9 (8.3)	39.4 (4.1)	57.6 (14.3)
Mean daily minimum °F (°C)	25.6 (−3.6)	27.8 (−2.3)	34.6 (1.4)	43.1 (6.2)	53.3 (11.8)	61.8 (16.6)	66.2 (19.0)	64.3 (17.9)	56.4 (13.6)	43.6 (6.4)	33.2 (0.7)	28.2 (−2.1)	44.8 (7.1)
Average precipitation inches (mm)	4.31 (109)	4.55 (116)	4.71 (120)	5.56 (141)	4.77 (121)	5.12 (130)	5.20 (132)	3.76 (96)	3.61 (92)	3.68 (93)	3.71 (94)	5.17 (131)	54.15 (1,375)
Average snowfall inches (cm)	0.8 (2.0)	0.2 (0.51)	0.2 (0.51)	0.0 (0.0)	0.0 (0.0)	0.0 (0.0)	0.0 (0.0)	0.0 (0.0)	0.0 (0.0)	0.0 (0.0)	0.0 (0.0)	0.0 (0.0)	1.2 (3.02)
Source: NOAA

== Demographics ==
Historical population
Census	Pop.	Note	%±
2020	1,189		—
U.S. Decennial Census

== Education ==
Gladeville is served by Wilson County Schools. It is zoned to Gladeville Elementary School, Gladeville Middle School, and Wilson Central High School.

== See also ==
- Cedars of Lebanon State Park
