= Elmore (name) =

Elmore is a given name and surname of English origin. The name is identified as a habitational name derived from the place name, Elmore in Gloucestershire, named from Old English elm 'elm' + fer 'river bank' or ofer 'ridge'.

== Given name ==
- Elmore Elver (1877–1921), American politician
- Elmore Harris (1855–1911), Canadian Baptist minister
- Elmore W. Hurst (1851–1915), member of the Illinois House of Representatives
- Elmore Hutchinson (born 1982), American cricketer
- Elmore James (1918–1963), American blues singer, songwriter and musician
- Elmore Keener (1935–1973), National Hockey League co-owner of the Pittsburgh Penguins
- Elmore Leonard (1925–2013), American novelist
- Elmore Morgenthaler (1922–1997), American basketball player
- Elmore Nixon (1933–1975), American jump blues pianist and singer
- Elmore Philpott (1896–1964), Canadian politician and journalist
- Elmore Y. Sarles (1859–1929), ninth Governor of North Dakota
- Elmore Smith (born 1949), American basketball player
- Elmore Spencer (born 1969), American basketball player
- Elmore Rual Torn (1931–2019), actor better known as Rip Torn

== Surname ==
- Albert Elmore (1904–1988), American college football coach
- Albert Stanhope Elmore (1827–1909), 11th Secretary of State of Alabama
- Alfred Elmore (1815–1881), British painter
- Amanda Elmore (born 1991), American Olympic rower
- Carolyn J. Elmore (born 1943), member of the Maryland House of Delegates
- Charles Elmore (fl. 1990s–2010s), American scholar and jazz historian
- Chris Elmore (born 1983), Welsh politician
- D. Page Elmore (1939–2010), member of the Maryland House of Delegates
- Doug Elmore (1939–2002), American football punter
- Edward C. Elmore (c. 1826–c. 1926), Treasurer of the Confederate States of America
- Elizabeth Elmore (born 1976), American singer-songwriter and lawyer
- Ernest Elmore (1901–1957), English theater producer and crime/fantasy writer
- Franklin H. Elmore (1799–1850), U.S. Senator from South Carolina
- Gay Elmore (fl. 1980s–2020s), American college basketball player and lawyer
- George Elmore (footballer) (1880–1916), English footballer
- Greg Elmore (1946–2026), American drummer
- Henry Elmore (1941–2023), American Negro League baseball player
- Henry M. Elmore (fl. 1850s–1860s), colonel in the Confederate States Army
- Henton Elmore (1921–1991), American politician
- Jake Elmore (born 1987), American baseball player
- James H. Elmore (1843–1914), mayor of Green Bay, Wisconsin
- Jeffrey Elmore (born 1978), member of the North Carolina House of Representatives
- Joan Elmore, American horseshoes pitcher
- Joann Elmore (fl. 1970s–2020s), American physician
- John Archer Elmore (1762–1834), American military officer and politician
- Jon Elmore (born 1996), American basketball player
- Larry Elmore (born 1948), American fantasy artist, illustrator of Dungeons and Dragons
- Len Elmore (born 1952), American college basketball analyst and former basketball player
- Mable Elmore (born c. 1960s), Canadian politician
- Malindi Elmore (born 1980), Canadian track and field athlete
- Rick Elmore (fl. 1980s–2010s), judge of the North Carolina Court of Appeals
- Ricky Elmore (born 1988), American football linebacker
- Robert Elmore (1913–1985), American composer, organist, and pianist
- Robert Elmore (basketball) (1954–1977), American basketball player
- Verdo Elmore (1899–1969), American baseball player
- Walter Elmore (born 1857, date of death unknown), U.S. Navy sailor and Medal of Honor recipient
- William Augustus Elmore (1812–1890), lawyer and judge in New Orleans, Louisiana
- William Cronk Elmore (1909–2003), American Manhattan Project physicist

== See also ==
- Historic Elmore Houses in South Windsor, CT
- Guy Elmour (died 2012), New Caledonian professional football manager
- Judge Elmore (disambiguation)
- Elmore (disambiguation)
