= Watertown, Tennessee =

- City
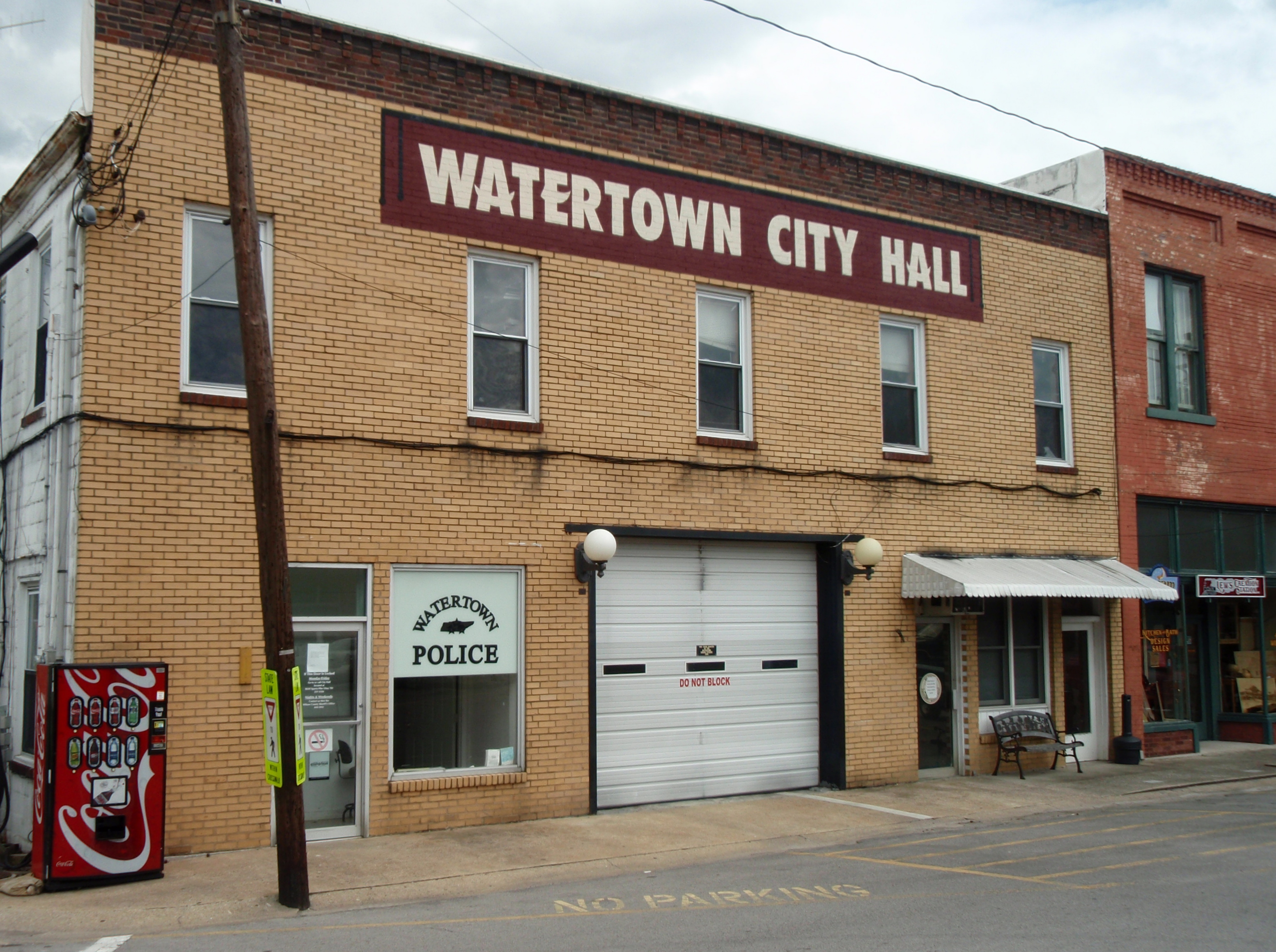
- Watertown City Hall

- Location of Watertown in Wilson County, Tennessee.
- Coordinates: 36°6′0″N 86°8′14″W
- Country: United States
- State: Tennessee
- County: Wilson
- Settled: 1780
- Incorporated: 1905
- Named for: Wilson L. Waters, founder

Area
  - Total: 1.44 sq mi (3.72 km^{2})
  - Land: 1.44 sq mi (3.72 km^{2})
  - Water: 0 sq mi (0.00 km^{2})
- Elevation: 653 ft (199 m)

Population (2020)
  - Total: 1,553
  - Density: 1,081.4/sq mi (417.52/km^{2})
- Time zone: UTC-6 (Central (CST))
  - Summer (DST): UTC-5 (CDT)
- ZIP code: 37184
- Area code: 615
- FIPS code: 47-78320
- GNIS feature ID: 1304411
- Website: www.watertowntn.com

Watertown is a city located in Wilson County, Tennessee. The population was 1,477 at the 2010 census. The population then raised to 1,553 after the 2020 census. It is located southeast of Lebanon, and northwest of Smithville.

== History ==
Prior to the city's establishment, the land was a Revolutionary War grant to Colonel Archibald Lytle and his brother William.

Circa 1790, the grandparents of Watertown's founder, Wilson L. Waters, moved into the area. In 1845, the post office moved from nearby Three Forks to Wilson's store. Waters expanded his operations with a sawmill, gristmill and blacksmith shop. Waters' 400-acre (1.6 km^{2}) farm eventually became Watertown.

The Nashville and Knoxville Railroad built a depot in Watertown in 1885, making it the hub of business in the area. The increased business led to a doubling of the village's size.

In 1903, a fire swept through the wood structures of the village, destroying many businesses. During the recovery period following the fire, a town square surrounded by brick building was laid out, creating the core of the current city of Watertown.

== Geography ==
Watertown is located at 36°06′00″N 86°08′14″W (36.100039, -86.137102).

According to the United States Census Bureau, the city has a total area of 1.2 square miles (3.1 km^{2}), all land.

== Demographics ==
Historical population
Census	Pop.	Note	%±
1910	517		—
1920	933		80.5%
1930	928		−0.5%
1940	908		−2.2%
1950	933		2.8%
1960	919		−1.5%
1970	1,061		15.5%
1980	1,300		22.5%
1990	1,250		−3.8%
2000	1,358		8.6%
2010	1,477		8.8%
2020	1,553		5.1%

=== 2020 census ===
As of the 2020 census, Watertown had a population of 1,553. The median age was 36.0 years. 26.9% of residents were under the age of 18 and 12.3% of residents were 65 years of age or older. For every 100 females there were 94.9 males, and for every 100 females age 18 and over there were 85.5 males age 18 and over.

0.0% of residents lived in urban areas, while 100.0% lived in rural areas.

There were 570 households in Watertown, of which 39.3% had children under the age of 18 living in them. Of all households, 41.8% were married-couple households, 17.5% were households with a male householder and no spouse or partner present, and 34.2% were households with a female householder and no spouse or partner present. About 27.9% of all households were made up of individuals and 13.1% had someone living alone who was 65 years of age or older.

There were 624 housing units, of which 8.7% were vacant. The homeowner vacancy rate was 3.7% and the rental vacancy rate was 4.1%.

Racial composition as of the 2020 census
Race	Number	Percent
White	1,293	83.3%
Black or African American	91	5.9%
American Indian and Alaska Native	9	0.6%
Asian	2	0.1%
Native Hawaiian and Other Pacific Islander	0	0.0%
Some other race	29	1.9%
Two or more races	129	8.3%
Hispanic or Latino (of any race)	58	3.7%

=== 2000 census ===
As of the census of 2000, there was a population of 1,358, with 542 households and 377 families residing in the city. The population density was 1,083.9 inhabitants per square mile (418.5/km^{2}). There were 605 housing units at an average density of 482.9 per square mile (186.4/km^{2}). The racial makeup of the city was 91.24% White, 6.11% African American, 0.37% Native American, 0.07% Asian, 0.66% from other races, and 1.55% from two or more races. Hispanic or Latino of any race were 1.25% of the population.

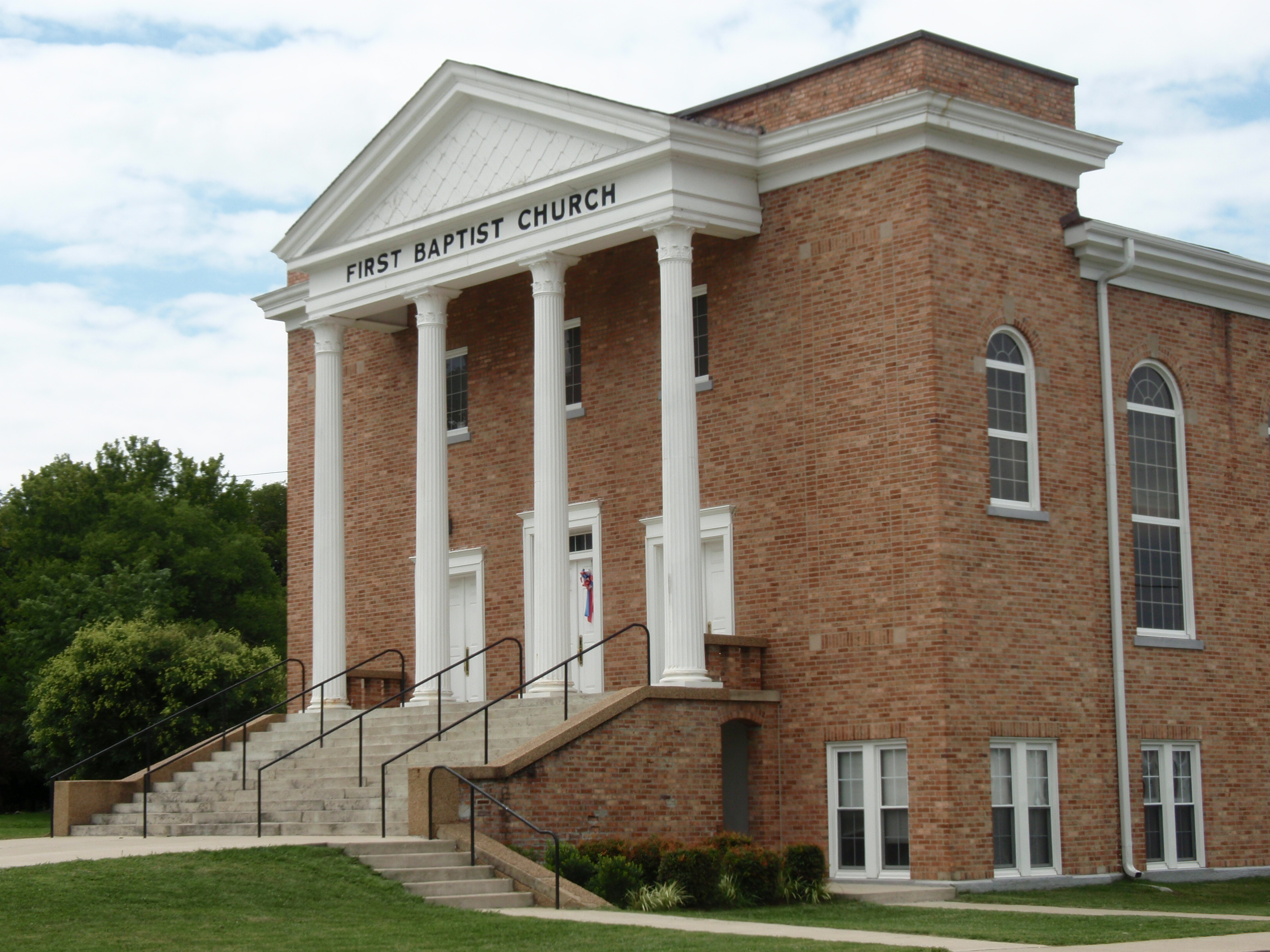
First Baptist Church in Watertown

There were 542 households, out of which 33.4% had children under the age of 18 living with them, 51.5% were married couples living together, 13.3% had a female householder with no husband present, and 30.3% were non-families. 28.4% of all households were made up of individuals, and 14.6% had someone living alone who was 65 years of age or older. The average household size was 2.51 and the average family size was 3.06.

In the city the population was spread out, with 26.7% under the age of 18, 8.5% from 18 to 24, 28.3% from 25 to 44, 21.2% from 45 to 64, and 15.4% who were 65 years of age or older. The median age was 37 years. For every 100 females, there were 89.7 males. For every 100 females age 18 and over, there were 82.8 males.

The median income for a household in the city was $35,662, and the median income for a family was $41,484. Males had a median income of $30,263 versus $22,500 for females. The per capita income for the city was $17,008. About 9.2% of families and 11.0% of the population were below the poverty line, including 15.2% of those under age 18 and 8.5% of those age 65 or over.

== Education ==
Watertown is served by Wilson County Schools. Its zoned schools are Watertown Elementary School, Watertown Middle School, and Watertown High School.

== Arts and Entertainment ==
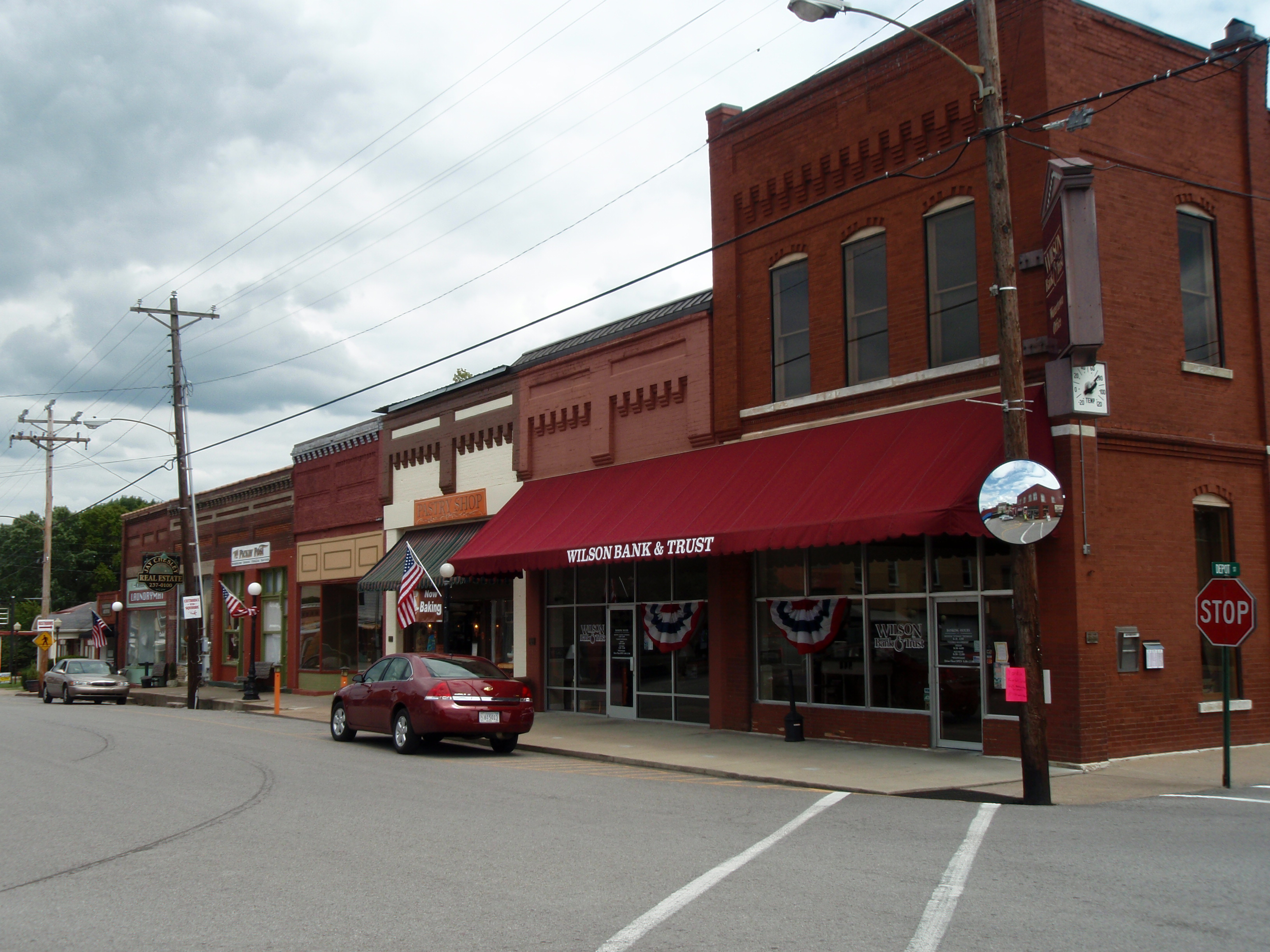
Watertown Historic District

- Old Henry (2021) was shot in Watertown, TN.
- Was the filming site of Dark Harvest 3: Skarecrow.
- In 2003, the Stardust Drive-in theater opened in Watertown, a very unusual event since most drive-ins around the country have closed.
- The city is a frequent destination of excursion trains from nearby Nashville run by the Tennessee Central Railway Museum.
- Watertown is noted for its annual Jazz Festival.
- The White Elephant Emporium in Watertown was featured in the episode "The Emu Chase" of American Pickers.
- Fiction novelist D.M. Barrett, author of Equinox, Raven I, II, III & IV, and Caliente I & II, is from Watertown.

=== Music ===
- In 1997, songwriter Tom T. Hall immortalized the city in a song titled appropriately, "Watertown, Tennessee".
- Taylor Swift filmed the music video for "Safe & Sound" in a forest in Watertown.
- Country singer Garth Brooks filmed a Dr Pepper television commercial and his "Wrapped Up In You" music video on the town square in 2001.
- Portions of the music video for the song "Red High Heels" by Kellie Pickler was shot at Robinson Stadium, the Watertown High School football field.
- Singer Justin Bieber filmed his music video for the song "One Less Lonely Girl". Filmed in Kleen O Matic laundromat.
- Darius Rucker filmed his music video for "Wagon Wheel" in Watertown, TN. Filmed in Kleen O Matic laundromat.
- American actress and singer-songwriter Jennette McCurdy filmed her music video for the song "Not That Far Away" in Watertown in 2010.
- Tim McGraw filmed the video for his song "Southern Voice" on East Main St. in Watertown in 2009.
- 2011 Chris Young filmed his video for the song [Young] on East Main St. at an abandoned gas station across from Oakley's Flower Shop.
- Blanco Brown filmed the video for "The Git Up" in Watertown.
