= Ellesmere =

Ellesmere may refer to:

== Places ==
=== Australia ===
- Ellesmere, Queensland, a locality in the South Burnett Region, Queensland
- the former name of Scottsdale, Tasmania, Australia

=== Canada ===
- Ellesmere Island, an Arctic island of Canada and named for Francis Egerton, 1st Earl of Ellesmere
- Ellesmere Road, an arterial road in Toronto, Ontario, Canada and named after Ellesmere, Shropshire
- Ellesmere station, a former Toronto subway station in Scarborough, Ontario, Canada, which was the site of a derailment in 2023

=== New Zealand ===
- Ellesmere, New Zealand, a locality in the Canterbury region of the South Island of New Zealand
  - Lake Ellesmere / Te Waihora, a lake near Ellesmere
  - Ellesmere (New Zealand electorate), an historic New Zealand electorate

=== United Kingdom ===
- Ellesmere, Shropshire, a market town in Shropshire, England
  - Ellesmere Castle
  - Ellesmere Rural, a civil parish to the west
- Ellesmere Park, area of Eccles, Greater Manchester, England
- Ellesmere Port, an industrial town in Cheshire, England
- Ellesmere Port and Neston, a former district and borough in Cheshire, England
- Ellesmere Canal, a canal in the United Kingdom, now known as the Llangollen Canal

== Other ==
- Francis Egerton, 1st Earl of Ellesmere, a 19th-century English politician and patron of the arts
- Earl of Ellesmere, title in the Peerage of the UK
- Ellesmere Choi, Hong Kong TVB actor
- The Ellesmere, a former public house in Walkden, England

== See also ==
- Ellesmere College (disambiguation)
- Elmore (disambiguation)
- Elsmere (disambiguation)
- Elsmore (disambiguation)
