= Green Hill, Tennessee =

- Town
- Location within Tennessee Location within the United States
- Coordinates: 36°13′51″N 86°34′25″W
- Country: United States
- State: Tennessee
- County: Wilson

Area
  - Total: 3.70 sq mi (9.59 km^{2})
  - Land: 3.47 sq mi (9.00 km^{2})
  - Water: 0.23 sq mi (0.59 km^{2})
- Elevation: 646 ft (197 m)

Population (2020)
  - Total: 6,518
  - Density: 1,875.6/sq mi (724.18/km^{2})
- Time zone: UTC-6
  - Summer (DST): UTC-5
- ZIP code: 37122;37138
- Area code: 615
- FIPS code: 47-31100
- GNIS feature ID: 1286093

Green Hill is a census-designated place (CDP) in western Wilson County, Tennessee. The population was 6,618 at the 2010 census.

== History ==
Green Hill was first settled before 1800 by John Cloyd and John Williamson, who moved their families to the area from Nashville to escape a smallpox outbreak. Colonel John Donelson, Jr., later established a summer home at Green Hill. The community's name may be a description of the location or may honor a former state treasurer of North Carolina.

During the 19th century, Green Hill was the site of a post office, established in 1834 or 1838 and closed in 1904.

Shortly before the outbreak of the Civil War, Green Hill supported a high school. Businesses included a general store, a hotel, a tobacco processor, a flour mill, and a carding machine. A high school was opened at the junction of Lebanon Road and North Greenhill Road in August 2020.

== Geography ==
Green Hill is located at 36°13′51″N 86°34′25″W (36.230879, -86.573623).

According to the United States Census Bureau, the CDP has a total area of 4.4 square miles (11 km^{2}), of which 3.9 square miles (10 km^{2}) is land and 0.5 square miles (1.3 km^{2}) (11.59%) is water.

== Demographics ==
Historical population
Census	Pop.	Note	%±
2020	6,518		—
U.S. Decennial Census

=== 2020 census ===
Green Hill racial composition
Race	Number	Percentage
White (non-Hispanic)	5,634	86.44%
Black or African American (non-Hispanic)	242	3.71%
Native American	6	0.09%
Asian	41	0.63%
Pacific Islander	1	0.02%
Other/Mixed	329	5.05%
Hispanic or Latino	265	4.07%

As of the 2020 United States census, there were 6,518 people, 2,482 households, and 2,078 families residing in the CDP.

=== 2000 census ===
As of the census of 2000, there were 7,068 people, 2,555 households, and 2,141 families residing in the CDP. The population density was 1,815.7 inhabitants per square mile (701.0/km^{2}). There were 2,613 housing units at an average density of 671.3 per square mile (259.2/km^{2}). The racial makeup of the CDP was 94.57% White, 3.03% African American, 0.16% Native American, 0.72% Asian, 0.03% Pacific Islander, 0.31% from other races, and 1.19% from two or more races. Hispanic or Latino of any race were 0.96% of the population.

There were 2,555 households, out of which 37.3% had children under the age of 18 living with them, 72.6% were married couples living together, 8.5% had a female householder with no husband present, and 16.2% were non-families. 13.0% of all households were made up of individuals, and 3.4% had someone living alone who was 65 years of age or older. The average household size was 2.77 and the average family size was 3.02.

In the CDP, the population was spread out, with 25.6% under the age of 18, 6.7% from 18 to 24, 28.3% from 25 to 44, 31.4% from 45 to 64, and 8.0% who were 65 years of age or older. The median age was 40 years. For every 100 females, there were 100.1 males. For every 100 females age 18 and over, there were 96.5 males.

The median income for a household in the CDP was $62,690, and the median income for a family was $66,610. Males had a median income of $45,931 versus $31,237 for females. The per capita income for the CDP was $25,926. About 2.4% of families and 3.4% of the population were below the poverty line, including 6.1% of those under age 18 and 0.9% of those age 65 or over.

== Education ==
The area is part of the Wilson County School District.

Zoned elementary schools serving sections include Lakeview Elementary School (northern), W. A. Wright Elementary School (central), and Mount Juliet Elementary School (south of Lebanon Road). The zoned secondary schools are Mount Juliet Middle School and Green Hill High School.
