= Watertown High School (Tennessee) =

Location
- 9360 Sparta Pike; Watertown, Tennessee 37184
- Coordinates: 36.09655°N 86.12626°W

Information
- Type: Public grades 9-12
- Principal: Darian Brown
- Staff: 44.83 (FTE)
- Enrollment: 680 (2022-2023)
- Student to teacher ratio: 15.17
- Color
- team_name: Purple Tigers
- Website: https://whs.wcschools.com/

Watertown High School (WHS) is a high school located in Watertown, Tennessee. WHS is part of the Wilson County School System.

In addition to Watertown it serves Greenvale, Norene, parts of Lebanon and Statesville.

== 2021-2022 School Administration ==
Principal - Darian Brown
Asst. Principals - Emily Adkisson, Ryan Hill
