= Lebanon High School (Tennessee) =

Public secondary school in Lebanon, Tennessee, United States

Location
- 500 Blue Devil Blvd; Lebanon, Tennessee 37087; 36°12′18″N 86°20′0″W

Information
- Type: Public
- Founded: 1918
- School district: Wilson County Schools
- Principal: Scott Walters
- Staff: 100.50 (FTE)
- Grades: 9–12
- Enrollment: 1,808 (2023-2024)
- Student to teacher ratio: 17.99
- Colors: Blue and white
- Mascot: Blue Devils
- Website: lhs.wcschools.com

Lebanon High School is a Grade 9–12 high school located in Lebanon, Tennessee founded in 1918 that is part of the Wilson County Schools (WCS) district.

The principal is Scott Walters, and is assisted by four assistant principals who are responsible for students within specific name ranges.

== Construction ==
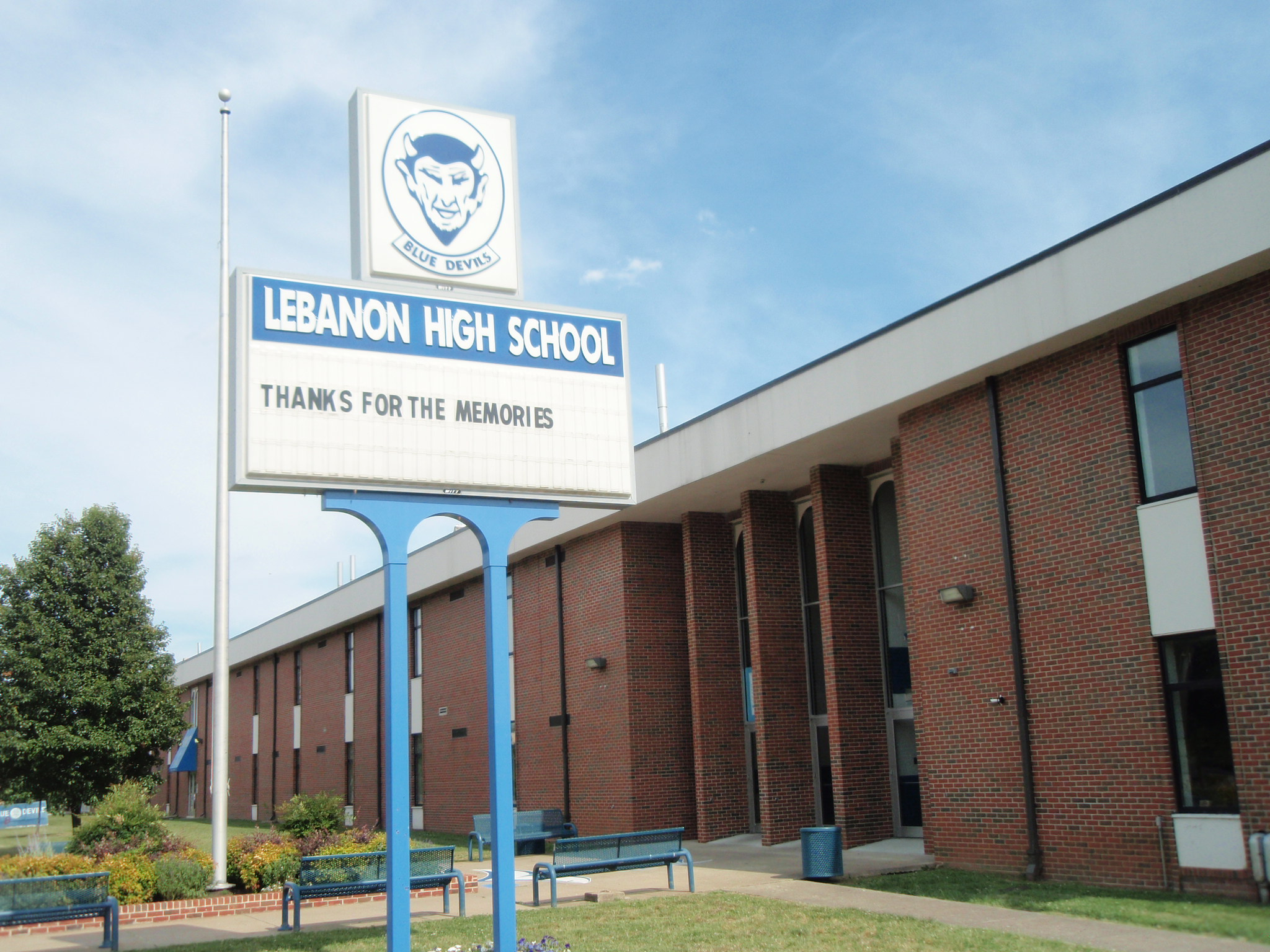
Former Lebanon High School before the opening of the new high school building

The building was first constructed in 1903 and housed a Grade K–8 school. In 1918, Wilson Country Schools significantly enlarged the building to house the high school in its place. A brick structure replaced the original in 1923, but a 1936 fire led to its demolition, resulting in Highland Heights Elementary and a separate high school being built. The school was renovated in 1959, and was fully reconstructed in 2012 by RG Anderson Company.

The current building is a three-story, 385,000-square-foot facility with a central two-story commons area. It is equipped with culinary kitchens, a cosmetology lab, auto mechanic shops, a carpentry studio, and ROTC facilities. There is a central atrium with a double-helical staircase that connects the separate floors to the rest of the building. The campus contains several external athletic fields for football, baseball, softball, soccer and tennis.

== History ==
The school's mascot is the Blue Devil, adopted due to a visiting group of French soldiers called the "Blue Devils" who promoted Liberty Bonds in 1918 to aid in World War I. Another school in Lebanon, Walter J. Baird Middle School uses the Blue Devil mascot despite being part of the Lebanon Special School District (LSSD), separate from WCS.

== Athletics ==
Lebanon High School offers baseball / softball, basketball, bowling, cheer, cross country, dance, football, flag football, golf, soccer, tennis, track and field, volleyball, and wrestling. A lot of these sports also have girls' and boys' teams (e.g. bowling, cross country, basketball). The school competes in TSSAA's middle grand division for district 4.

Team State Titles
Year	Sport	Class	Award	Details
1971	Girls' Basketball		Champions	(30-2)
1975	Girls' Basketball	Large	Runner-Up	(30-4)
1978	Girls' Basketball	AAA	Runner-Up	(25-6)
1982	Girls' Basketball	AAA	Runner-Up	(29-6)
2021	Girls' Basketball	AAA	Runner-Up	(31-5)

== Notable alumni ==
- John Ray Clemmons (born 1977), member of the Tennessee House of Representatives, representing the 55th district, in West Nashville.
- Zion Logue (born 2001), NFL player for the Buffalo Bills
