= Elmore =

Elmore may refer to:

== Places ==
=== United States ===
- Elmore, Alabama, a town
- Elmore, Illinois, a village
- Elmore, Minnesota, a city
- Elmore, Ohio, a village
- Elmore City, Oklahoma, a town
- Elmore, Vermont, a town
  - Lake Elmore, a lake within the town
- Elmore, Wisconsin, an unincorporated community
- Elmore County (disambiguation)
- Elmore Township (disambiguation)

=== Australia ===
- Elmore, Victoria, a suburb of Bendigo
  - Elmore railway station

=== United Kingdom ===
- Elmore, Gloucestershire, England, a village

== Other uses ==
- Elmore (name), including a list of people with the given name or surname
- Elmore Magazine, an American music publication founded in 2005
- Elmore Manufacturing Company, a Brass Era car manufacturer
- Elmore Sports Group, owner of multiple minor league baseball and hockey teams
- Elmore, California, the fictional town where The Amazing World of Gumball is set

== See also ==
- Elsmore (disambiguation)
