= Winfree =

Winfree may refer to:

== People ==
- Arthur Winfree (1942–2002), American biologist
- Daniel Winfree (born 1953), American lawyer and jurist
- Erik Winfree (born 1969), American biochemist and computer scientist, son of Arthur Winfree
- Juwann Winfree (born 1996), American football player
- Kenny Winfree (born 1954), American singer-songwriter
- William P. Winfree (born 1951), American physicist
- Haystak (born 1973), American hip-hop musician born Jason Winfree
- Vado (rapper) (born 1985), American hip-hop musician born Teeyon Winfree

== Places ==
- Old River-Winfree, Texas, a city in Chambers and Liberty counties, Texas, United States
- Winfree Academy, charter schools in Texas
- Winfree Observatory, an astronomical observatory in Lynchburg, Virginia, United States
