= Zion Logue =

American football player (born 2001)

No. 69 – Cleveland Browns
- Position: Defensive tackle
- Roster status: Practice squad

Personal information
- Born: July 13, 2001 (age 25); Lebanon, Tennessee, U.S.
- Listed height: 6 ft 6 in (1.98 m)
- Listed weight: 325 lb (147 kg)

Career information
- High school: Lebanon
- College: Georgia (2019–2023)
- NFL draft: 2024: 6th round, 197th overall pick

Career history
- Atlanta Falcons (2024)*; Buffalo Bills (2024–2025); Cleveland Browns (2026–present)*
- * Offseason or practice squad member only

Awards and highlights
- 2× CFP national champion (2021, 2022)

Career NFL statistics as of 2025
- Total tackles: 4
- Sacks: 0.5
- Pass deflections: 1
- Stats at Pro Football Reference

Zion Jabez Logue (born July 13, 2001) is an American professional football defensive tackle for the Cleveland Browns of the National Football League (NFL). He played college football for the Georgia Bulldogs and was selected by the Atlanta Falcons in the sixth round of the 2024 NFL draft.

== Early life ==
Logue was born on July 13, 2001, and grew up in Lebanon, Tennessee, being raised by his mother and grandmother. He attended Lebanon High School where he was a two-way lineman, totaling 57 tackles as a senior while helping the team make the playoffs for the first time in 15 years. He helped the team allow only 11 points per game that year and was ranked seventh on The Tennessean's list of the top prospects in the Nashville area. He committed to play college football for the Georgia Bulldogs as a three-star recruit.

== College career ==
Logue appeared in two games as a true freshman in 2019, recording no tackles, and then had eight tackles in 2020 while seeing action in five games. He made 11 tackles, one tackle-for-loss (TFL) and a sack during the 2021 season, remaining a backup while the team won the national championship, and then won a starting role at defensive tackle in 2022. He played in 14 of 15 games for the team that year and was a starter six times, ending with 16 total tackles while helping the Bulldogs repeat as national champions. He returned in 2023 and played all 14 games, 10 as a starter, and posted 17 tackles, 2.5 TFLs and 0.5 sacks. He ended his collegiate career having appeared in 50 games, 16 as a starter, and had 52 tackles and 1.5 sacks. He was invited to the East–West Shrine Bowl and NFL Scouting Combine.

== Professional career ==
Pre-draft measurables
Height	Weight	Arm length	Hand span	Wingspan	40-yard dash	10-yard split	20-yard split	20-yard shuttle	Three-cone drill	Vertical jump	Broad jump	Bench press
6 ft 5 5/8 in (1.97 m)	314 lb (142 kg)	33 1/2 in (0.85 m)	10 in (0.25 m)	6 ft 8 1/4 in (2.04 m)	5.14 s	1.82 s	3.00 s	4.83 s	7.85 s	29.0 in (0.74 m)	9 ft 1 in (2.77 m)	17 reps
All values from NFL Combine/Pro Day

=== Atlanta Falcons ===
Logue was selected in the sixth round (197th overall) of the 2024 NFL draft by the Atlanta Falcons. The Falcons previously obtained the selection in a trade with the Cleveland Browns for Deion Jones. He was waived on August 27, 2024, and re-signed to the practice squad.

=== Buffalo Bills ===
On October 1, 2024, Logue was signed by the Buffalo Bills off of the Falcons' practice squad. He was waived on November 7, and re-signed to the practice squad. Logue signed a reserve/future contract with the Bills on January 27, 2025.

On August 26, 2025, Logue was released by the Bills as part of final roster cuts and re-signed to the practice squad the next day. On January 19, 2026, he signed a reserve/futures contract with Buffalo. On August 29, Logue was waived by the Bills.

=== Cleveland Browns ===
On September 7, 2026, Logue signed with the Cleveland Browns' practice squad.
