= Mount Juliet, Tennessee =

Mt. Juliet, Tennessee Mount Juliet
- City
- Flag Seal
- Motto: City Between The Lakes
- Location of Mt. Juliet in Wilson County, Tennessee.
- Coordinates: 36°12′10″N 86°30′49″W
- Country: United States
- State: Tennessee
- County: Wilson
- Established: 1835
- Incorporated: 1972
- Named for: Mount Juliet Estate (County Kilkenny, Ireland)

Government
  - Type: Commission-City Manager
  - Mayor: James Maness
  - City Manager: Kenny Martin
  - Vice Mayor: Bill Trivett
  - City Commissioners: Ray Justice, Scott Hefner, Jennifer Milele

Area
  - Total: 26.08 sq mi (67.54 km^{2})
  - Land: 25.76 sq mi (66.71 km^{2})
  - Water: 0.32 sq mi (0.83 km^{2})
- Elevation: 683 ft (208 m)

Population (2020)
  - Total: 39,289
  - Density: 1,525.4/sq mi (588.96/km^{2})
- Time zone: UTC-6 (CST)
  - Summer (DST): UTC-5 (CDT)
- ZIP code: 37121 (P.O. boxes); 37122 (gen. delivery); 37138 (northwestern gen. delivery)
- Area codes: 615, 629
- FIPS code: 47-50780
- Website: www.mtjuliet-tn.gov

Mt. Juliet (also referred to as Mount Juliet) is a city located in western Wilson County, Tennessee, United States. A suburb of Nashville, it is approximately 17 miles (27 km) east of downtown Nashville. Mt. Juliet is located mostly between two major national east-west routes, Interstate 40 and U.S. Route 70. As of the 2020 United States census, Mount Juliet has a population of approximately 39,289 people. Mt. Juliet is the largest city in Wilson County. The official city charter has the name listed as Mt. Juliet; however, the United States Postal Service lists its name as Mount Juliet.

== History ==
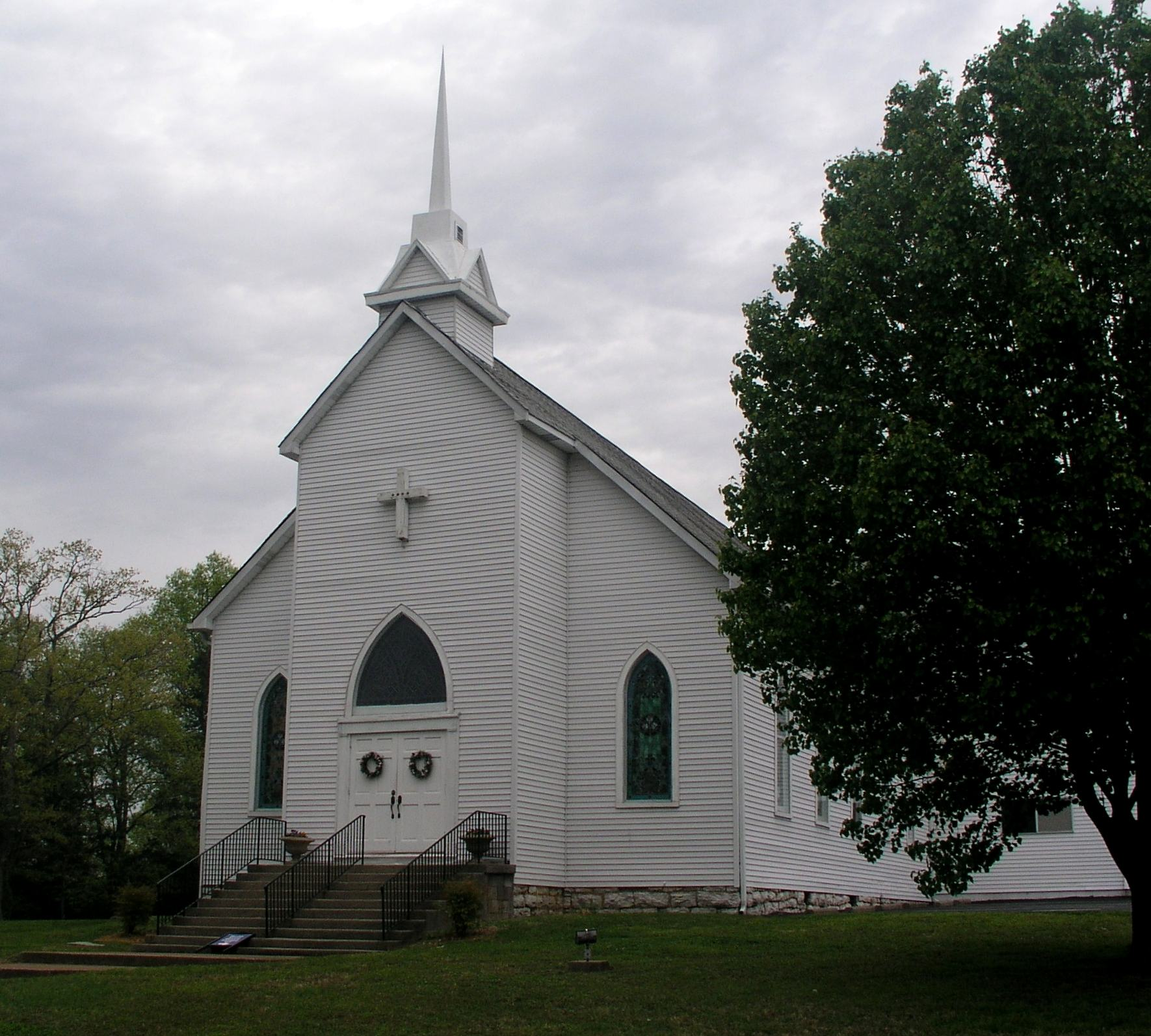
Dating back to the mid-1800s Cook's United Methodist Church is one of the oldest churches in Mt. Juliet

Mt. Juliet was formed in 1835 and incorporated as a city in 1972. The most widely accepted theory regarding the naming of the town is that it is named for the Mount Juliet Estate, a manor house in County Kilkenny, Ireland. It is the only U.S. city with this name.

In the early morning hours of March 3, 2020, Mt. Juliet was struck by an EF3 tornado that destroyed hundreds of homes, along with West Wilson Middle School and Stoner Creek Elementary. Five people were killed by the tornado, three of whom were in Mt. Juliet.

== Geography ==
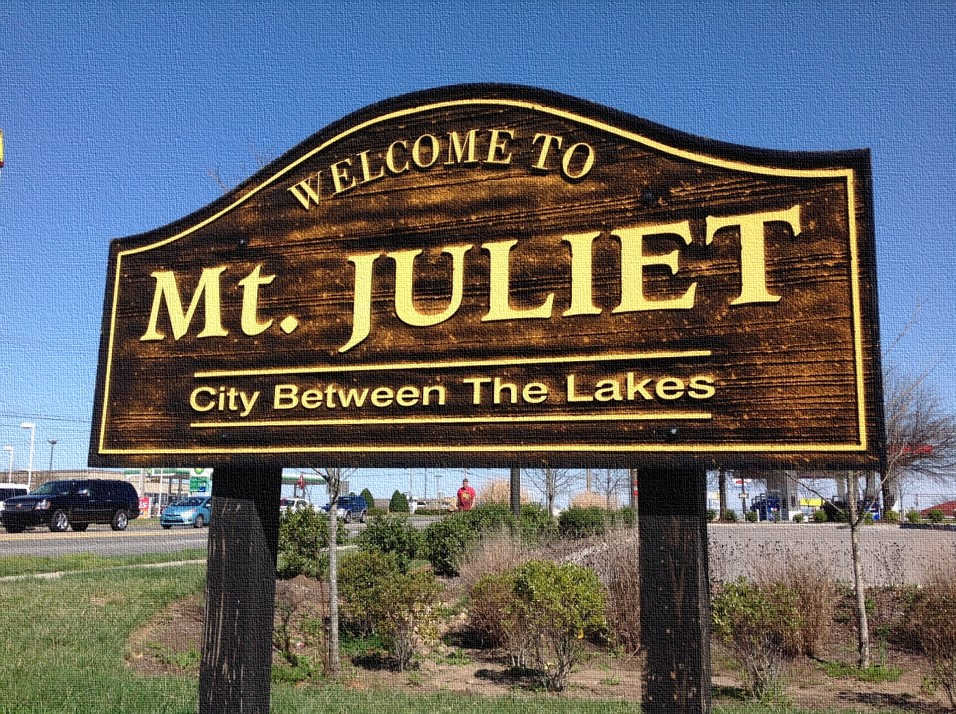
Sign on Mt. Juliet Road (Highway 171) welcoming commuters to Mt. Juliet. (Replaced 2017)

Mt. Juliet is located at 36°12'10" North, 86°30'49" West (36.202654, -86.513583).

According to the United States Census Bureau, the city has a total area of 16.6 square miles (43 km^{2}), of which 16.2 square miles (42 km^{2}) is land and 0.3 square miles (0.78 km^{2}) is water. The total area is 1.99% water. Recent annexations along the east side of South Rutland Road as well as a land swap with the City of Lebanon for the Bel Air at Beckwith project (southeast quadrant of I-40/Beckwith Road interchange) have increased the city's geographical area to approximately 21.78 square miles (56.4 km^{2}).

Mt. Juliet is located between Old Hickory Lake to its north and Percy Priest Lake to its south, both of which are man-made reservoirs.

== Demographics ==
Historical population
Census	Pop.	Note	%±
1980	2,879		—
1990	5,389		87.2%
2000	12,366		129.5%
2010	23,671		91.4%
2020	39,289		66.0%
2025 (est.)	45,172	▲	15.0%

Mt. Juliet has claimed to be the "fastest-growing city in Tennessee," and it does qualify for this distinction considering growth from 2000 to 2015 for Tennessee cities with a population over 10,000. In recent years, Thompson's Station in Williamson County and Spring Hill in Williamson County have grown by a larger percentage.

=== Racial and ethnic composition ===
Mount Juliet city, Tennessee – Racial and ethnic composition Note: the U.S. census treats Hispanic/Latino as an ethnic category. This table excludes Latinos from the racial categories and assigns them to a separate category. Hispanics/Latinos may be of any race.
Race / Ethnicity (NH = Non-Hispanic)	Pop 2010	Pop 2020	% 2010	% 2020
White alone (NH)	20,179	29,711	85.25%	75.62%
Black or African American alone (NH)	1,577	3,188	6.66%	8.11%
Native American or Alaska Native alone (NH)	89	96	0.38%	0.24%
Asian alone (NH)	578	2,008	2.44%	5.11%
Pacific Islander alone (NH)	8	12	0.03%	0.03%
Some Other Race alone (NH)	46	182	0.19%	0.46%
Mixed Race or Multi-Racial (NH)	409	1,686	1.73%	4.29%
Hispanic or Latino (any race)	785	2,406	3.32%	6.12%
Total	23,671	39,289	100.00%	100.00%

=== 2020 census ===
As of the 2020 United States census, there was a population of 39,289, with 14,464 households and 9,412 families residing in the city. The median age was 37.2 years, 26.7% of residents were under the age of 18, and 13.7% were 65 years of age or older. For every 100 females there were 91.8 males, and for every 100 females age 18 and over there were 88.5 males age 18 and over.

There were 14,464 households in Mount Juliet, of which 40.6% had children under the age of 18 living in them. Of all households, 58.8% were married-couple households, 12.5% were households with a male householder and no spouse or partner present, and 23.4% were households with a female householder and no spouse or partner present. About 21.0% of all households were made up of individuals and 7.9% had someone living alone who was 65 years of age or older.

There were 15,090 housing units, of which 4.1% were vacant. The homeowner vacancy rate was 1.0% and the rental vacancy rate was 6.9%.

98.7% of residents lived in urban areas, while 1.3% lived in rural areas.

=== 2010 census ===
As of the census of 2010, there was a population of 23,671, with 8,562 households and 6,674 families residing in the city. The population density was 958.34 persons per square mile, and the housing unit density was 346.64 units per square mile. The racial makeup of the city was 86.92% White, 6.70% Black or African American, 2.47% Asian, 0.44% Native American, 0.05% Pacific Islander, 1.42% from other races, and 2.00% from two or more races. Those of Hispanic or Latino origins were 3.32% of the population.

Of the 8,562 households, 41.35% had children under the age of 18 living in them, 62.14% were married couples living together, 4.04% had a male householder with no wife present, 11.77% had a female householder with no husband present, and 22.05% were non-families. 17.96% of all households were made up of individuals, and 5.49% had someone living alone who was 65 years of age or older. The average household size was 2.75 and the average family size was 3.13.

In the city, the population was spread out, with 28.68% under the age of 18, 62.57% ages 18 to 64, and 8.75% ages 65 and over. The median age was 35.7 years. 52.00% of the population was female and 48.00% was male.

The median household income was $70,102, and the median family income was $76,585. Males had a median income of $52,841, versus $41,179 for females. The per capita income was $28,699. About 4.6% of families and 5.4% of the population were below the poverty line, including 6.6% of those under the age of 18 and 3.8% of those age 65 and over.

=== 2000 census ===
As of the census of 2000, there was a population of 12,366, with 4,341 households and 3,576 families residing in the city. The population density was 761.2 inhabitants per square mile (293.9/km^{2}). There were 4,673 housing units at an average density of 287.6 per square mile (111.0/km^{2}). The racial makeup of the city was 93.86% Caucasian, 3.93% African American, 0.39% Native American, 0.52% Asian, 0.01% Pacific Islander, 0.29% from other races, and 1.00% from two or more races. 1.17% of the population were Hispanic or Latino of any race.

There were 4,341 households, out of which 46.0% had children under the age of 18 living with them, 67.3% were married couples living together, 11.2% had a female householder with no husband present, and 17.6% were non-families. 13.8 percent of all households were made up of individuals, and 3.3% had someone living alone who was 65 years of age or older. The average household size was 2.82 and the average family size was 3.12.

In the city, the population was spread out, with 30.5% under the age of 18, 6.5% from 18 to 24, 35.3% from 25 to 44, 21.4% from 45 to 64, and 6.3% who were 65 years of age or older. The median age was 34 years. For every 100 females, there were 95.4 males. For every 100 females age 18 and over, there were 93.4 males.

In 2017, the median income household income was $80,130. The medium value of owner-occupied housing units is $238,700 and 7% of the population and 1.7% of families were below the poverty line. 3.2% of those under the age of 18 and 4.0% of those 65 and older were living below the poverty line. Wilson County is the 2nd wealthiest county in Tennessee.

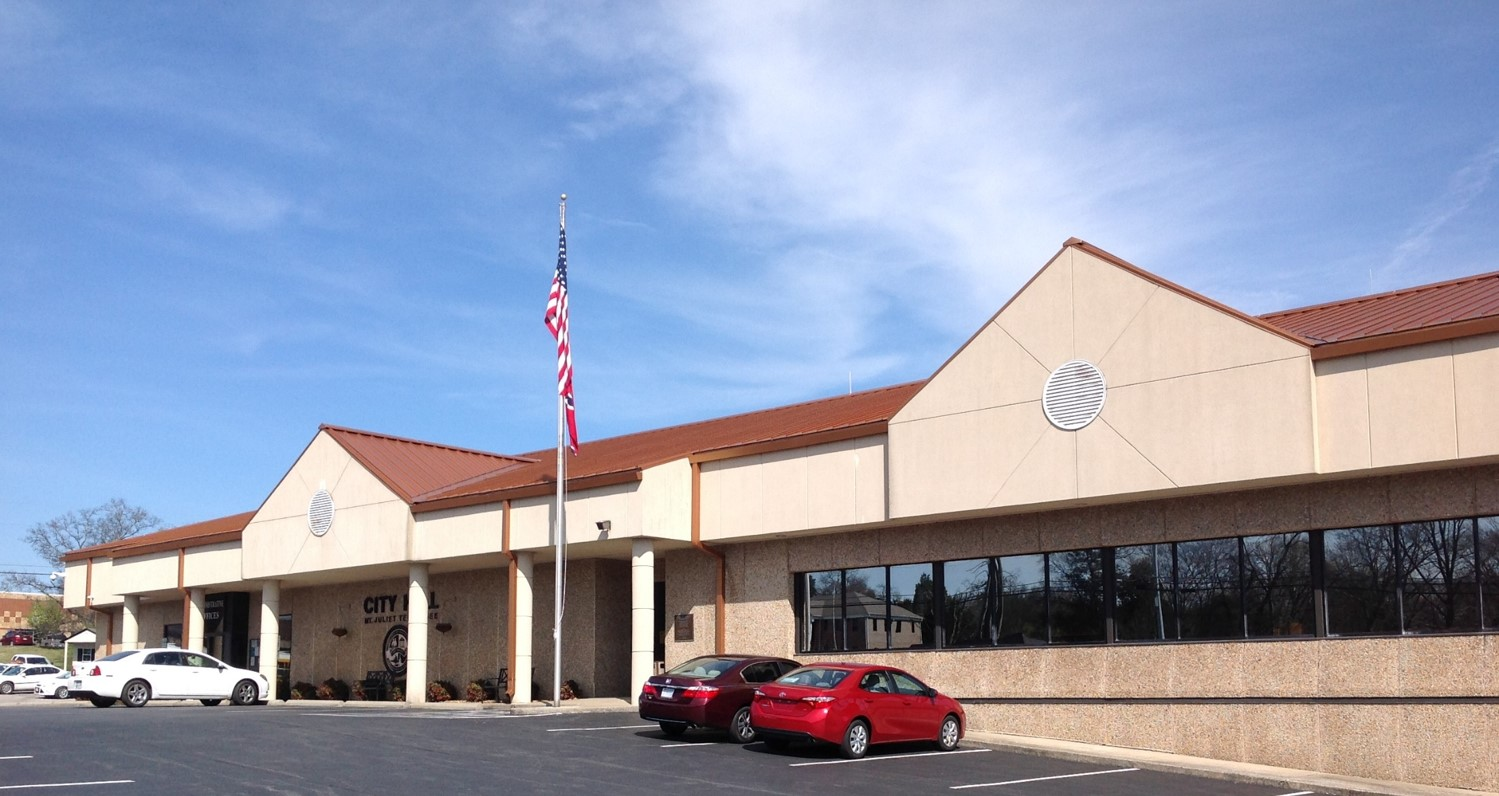
Mt. Juliet City Hall on Mt. Juliet Rd.

== Government and politics ==
Mt. Juliet operates on a "city manager-commission" system. It has five elected leaders: four commissioners elected by district and a mayor elected at-large. The mayor serves as chairperson of the city commission. All five officials serve four-year terms, and are officially part-time employees. The commission selects and appoints a city manager, who is employed full-time and runs the city's business on a day-to-day basis.

Mt. Juliet currently serves as the anchor city for Tennessee House of Representatives District 57 (Rep. Susan Lynn-R) and Tennessee Senate District 17. As of 2026, Mt. Juliet is mainly in Tennessee's 5th congressional district, but a northern piece is split in the 6th.

== Education ==
Mt. Juliet's public schools are operated by the Wilson County School District.

Elementary schools that serve Mt. Juliet include Springdale Elementary School, Mt. Juliet Elementary School, Elzie D. Patton Elementary School, W. A. Wright Elementary School, Lakeview Elementary School, and Rutland Elementary School (for sections south of Interstate 40). Middle schools that serve Mt. Juliet include Mt. Juliet Middle School, West Wilson Middle School, and Gladeville Middle School (for sections south of I-40). Most of Mt. Juliet is zoned to Mt. Juliet High School. The northwestern portion of the city is zoned to Green Hill High School, while areas south of I-40 are zoned to Wilson Central High School.

Mount Juliet Christian Academy is in Mount Juliet.

== Transportation ==
Interstate 40 and U.S. Route 70 (Lebanon Road) run east/west through Mt. Juliet, and State Route 171 (Mt Juliet Road) runs north-to-south connecting US-70 to I-40, before continuing toward Interstate 24 in the Antioch area. Interstate 40 has two exits in the city.

Mt. Juliet serves as a stop on the WeGo Star commuter rail service from Nashville to Lebanon, operating over freight carrier Nashville and Eastern Railroad. The WeGo Star has stations in downtown Nashville, Donelson, Hermitage, Mt. Juliet, Martha (State Route 109), and Lebanon. The WeGo Star also runs trains for Tennessee Titans games, New Year's Eve, Wilson County Fair, other events downtown Nashville.

For commercial air traffic, Mt. Juliet contains Nashville International Airport, located 9 miles (14 km) west of the city via Interstate 40.

== City services ==
The City of Mt. Juliet operates a police department. The city has a career Fire Department (FDMJ) that provides primary Fire protection and EMS services to the city. FDMJ serves Mt. Juliet with 3 stations. One station on Belinda Parkway, another station located on Hill Street, and a third station near Green Hill High School on the north side of the town. In addition, Mt. Juliet has a police station near Charlie Daniels Park on the city's northwest side. In December 2008, the Mt. Juliet Police Department Animal Control Division opened a shelter on Industrial Drive. An additional 57 acres was recently added to enhance Mt. Juliet’s park system, as well as an 8-acre tract of land dedicated to youth soccer. Youth sports are operated by private non profit organizations. Baseball and softball are run by Mt. Juliet League, Inc. Football and cheerleading are run by Mt. Juliet Youth Sports Association and basketball is run by the West Wilson Basketball Association.

== Notable people ==
- Nate Bargatze, comedian, community college student, water meter reader
- Muriel Bevis, athlete
- Bjorn Bjorholm, bonsai artist
- Levi Brown, professional football player
- John Edgar Browning, writer, scholar, professor
- Amanda Butler, basketball coach
- Alysha Clark, professional basketball player for the Israeli team Elitzur Ramla and the Las Vegas Aces of the Women's National Basketball Association (WNBA)
- Bobby Hamilton, NASCAR driver
- Michael Jasper, professional football player
- Greg Locke, Christian pastor
- Chase Montgomery, NASCAR driver
- Don Ray, professional basketball player
- Sammy Sanders, NASCAR driver
- Dale Wainwright, Texas Supreme Court
- Barry Wilmore, astronaut
- Ross Winn, politician
- Joan Elmore, athlete

=== Musicians ===
- Adrian Belew
- Owen Bradley
- Charlie Daniels
- Sid Harkreader
- Chloe Kohanski
- Erika Jo
- Tracy Lawrence
- Loretta Lynn
- Collin Raye
- Leon Russell
- David P. Sartor
- Leroy Van Dyke
- Darryl Worley
- Johnnie Wright
- Guy Clark
- Caleb Followill
- Nathan Followill
- Jared Followill
- Matthew Followill
