= Wilson L. Waters =

American businessman and politician (1818–1903)

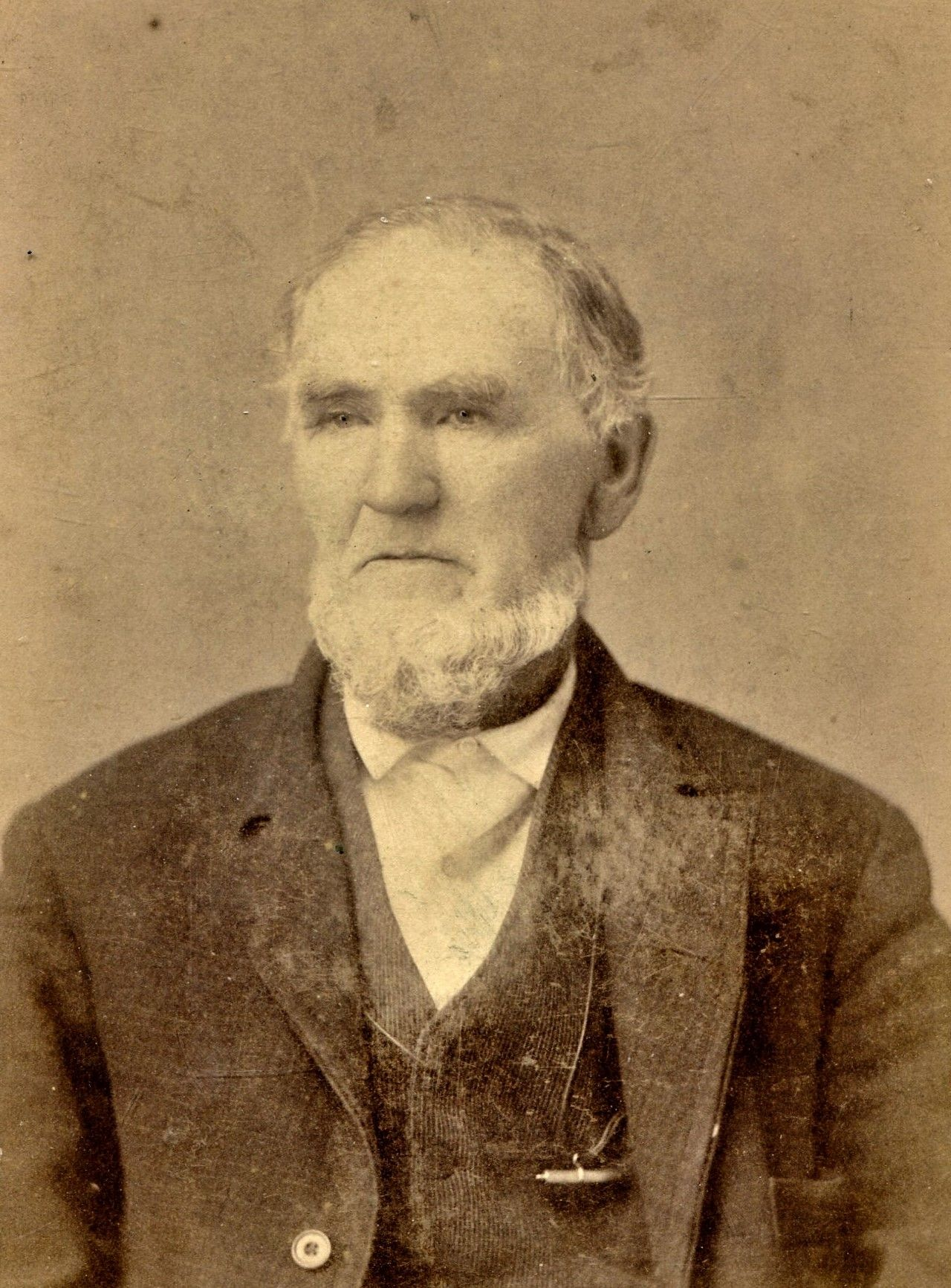

Member of the 34th Tennessee House of Representatives
- In office 1865–1867
- Constituency: Wilson County

Personal details
- Born: Wilson Lawrence Waters; November 11, 1818 Three Forks, Tennessee
- Died: December 3, 1903 (aged 85) Watertown, Tennessee
- Resting place: Waters Cemetery; Watertown, Tennessee; 36.10420°N 86.12530°E
- Party: Whig (by 1848); Republican (by 1860)
- Spouse: Christiana Bryan (m. 1844)
- Occupation: Businessman; politician; farmer; miller; hotelier

Wilson Lawrence Waters (November 11, 1818 – December 3, 1903) was an American businessman, farmer and politician who served in the 34th Tennessee House of Representatives from 1865 to 1867. Born in Watertown, Tennessee, the town was called Three Forks until being renamed for him. Waters was a member of the Whig Party until later becoming a Republican.

== Early life and ancestry ==
Wilson Lawrence Waters was born on November 11, 1818, in Watertown, Tennessee. His paternal grandparents, Shelah and Nancy (née Turner) Waters, had moved from Charles County, Maryland — a state in which Turner's family had been among the earliest settlers — to Virginia before again travelling west to Round Lick Creek, where they settled circa 1790.

== Career ==
Waters owned and operated a general store. By 1845, the local post office had moved into the store, the reason for the town's renaming. He was a delegate to the 1848 Whig National Convention in Philadelphia. In 1857, exploiting the water of the local creek, he built a water-powered grist mill and saw mill, as well as a blacksmithery. In 1858, he was appointed the first postmaster. He organized the Waters and Allen Foundry in Nashville.

In 1864, Waters was elected to the 34th Tennessee House of Representatives representing Wilson County, Tennessee. During his term, appealed for Black citizens to be tried in the same manner as White citizens. The appeal was rejected.

Waters, President of the Lebanon–Sparta Turnpike, was a major force in building the Nashville and Knoxville Railroad through Watertown, which caused the community to explode in size. In 1887, Waters shoveled the first dirt to build the railway in front of a crowd of spectators.

In the 1890s, Waters built the Ellen Hotel, the first in Watertown.

== Personal life and death ==
Waters married Christiana Bryan on December 17, 1844. That year, the couple built a log cabin and lived there until their permanent residence, which still stands, was completed. To celebrate their 50th wedding anniversary, in 1894, the couple decorated their home with bouquets from Christiana's garden and served turkeys, chicken pies, cherry cobblers, custard pies and iced cakes.

Waters claimed to be psychic, and kept a dream journal documenting his claimed premonitions.

Waters died in Watertown on December 3, 1903, aged 85. He was buried in Waters Cemetery.
