= Greenvale, Tennessee =

Unincorporated community in Tennessee, US

Coordinates: 35.999784°N 86.197768°W

Greenvale is an unincorporated community in Wilson County, in the U.S. state of Tennessee.

== History ==
Greenvale was platted in 1871. A post office called Greenvale was established in 1870, and remained in operation until 1905.

== Education ==
Greenvale is served by Wilson County Schools. Its zoned schools are Watertown Elementary School, Watertown Middle School, and Watertown High School.
