= The Wilson Post =

Online media outlet in Lebanon, Tennessee, United States

- Founded: June 2003
- Headquarters: Lebanon, Tennessee
- Website: mainstreetmediatn.com/the-wilson-post

The Wilson Post is a newspaper based in Lebanon, Tennessee that provides coverage to Wilson County, Tennessee. The newspaper is primarily an online outlet, with news distributed by its website, but also publishes in print.

== History ==
The Wilson Post was founded in June 2003 with the launch of its website.
