= Jim West (baseball) =

American baseball player

- First baseman
- Born: April 23, 1905; Mobile, Alabama, U.S.
- Died: June, 1970; Philadelphia, Pennsylvania, U.S.
- Batted: Switch Threw: Right

Negro league baseball debut
- 1930, for the Birmingham Black Barons

Last appearance
- 1948, for the Indianapolis Clowns

Teams
- Birmingham Black Barons (1930); Cleveland Cubs (1931); Birmingham Black Barons (1932); Memphis Red Sox (1932); Nashville Elite Giants (1933–1934); Columbus Elite Giants (1935); Washington Elite Giants (1936–1937); Baltimore Elite Giants (1938–1940); Philadelphia Stars (1939–1945); New York Black Yankees (1947); Indianapolis Clowns (1948)

James West (April 23, 1905 – June, 1970), nicknamed "Shifty Jim", was an American Negro league first baseman during the 1930s and 1940s.

A native of Mobile, Alabama, West was selected starting first baseman in the 1936 East–West All-Star Game, and was an all-star again in 1942. The great-uncle of fellow Negro leaguer Henry Elmore, West died in Philadelphia, Pennsylvania in 1970 at age 58.
