= Elsmere =

Elsmere may refer to a place in the United States:

- Elsmere, Delaware
- Elsmere, Kentucky
- Elsmere, Nebraska
- Elsmere, New York

== See also ==
- Ellesmere (disambiguation)
- Elsmore (disambiguation)
