= Green Hill High School =

Public secondary school in Mt. Juliet, Tennessee, United States

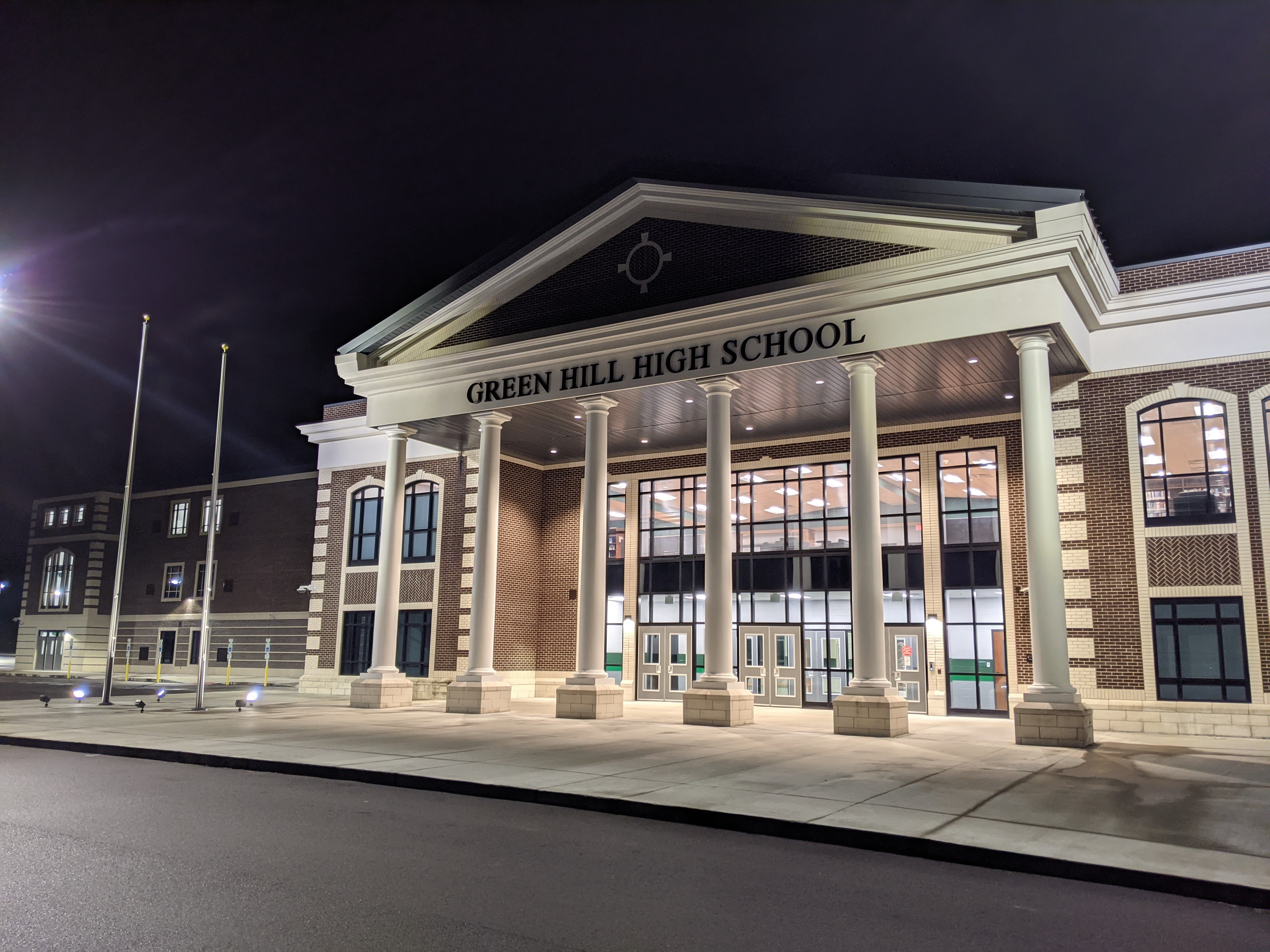
- Main entrance of Green Hill High School, facing N. Greenhill Rd.

Location
- 220 N. Greenhill Road; Mt. Juliet, Tennessee 37122; 36.227920°N 86.541835°W

Information
- Type: Public High School
- Established: 2020
- Principal: Kevin Dawson
- Assistant Principals: Abby Budziszewski, Joseph Crumby, Kelly MacLean, Courtney Quisberg
- Faculty: 95
- Grades: 9–12
- Enrollment: 1,683 (2022–23)
- Colors: Green and Silver
- Mascot: Tony the Hawk
- Feeder schools: Mt. Juliet Middle School
- Website: https://ghhs.wcschools.com/

Green Hill High School (GHHS) is a public high school in Mt. Juliet, Tennessee. It is one of the largest public schools in Wilson County and is part of the Wilson County School District.

Completed in the fall of 2020, Green Hill High School is the largest public project in Wilson County history, with a budget of 107 million. GHHS sits on a 60-acre campus, and the facilities have a 400,000+ square-foot footprint. The school has a capacity of 2,000 students.

It serves northwest portions of Mt. Juliet and northern Green Hill.

Green Hill High School's principal is Kevin Dawson. The school's colors are green and white, and the mascot is a hawk named Tony. Students reportedly named the mascot after professional skater Tony Hawk.

== History and notable events ==
After years of discussion and debate, ground was broken for the new school on August 29, 2018. GHHS was built to ease the overflowing student population at nearby Mt. Juliet High School.

=== Tornado recovery ===
As a result of the deadly March 2020 tornado, 1,700 students and 150 staff members were displaced from destroyed schools. Wilson County Schools issued a tornado recovery plan to address the property destruction and displaced students. Green Hill High School, along with Mt. Juliet High School, was converted into a grade 7-12 school to temporarily house displaced students. Due to these extra students, Green Hill High School opened slightly above capacity, with about 2,050 7th–12th graders in the building during its first year.

=== COVID-19 ===
Green Hill High School opened at the height of the COVID-19 pandemic. As decided by the Wilson County School's Board of Education and Superintendent, Green Hill High School, as well as other Wilson County Schools, opened in a "hybrid" instruction model. In this learning model, students were separated alphabetically and attended school two days a week. GHHS reverted to completely remote learning multiple times due to unsafe COVID-19 infection rates in the community. Ultimately, in February 2021, Green Hill High School students went back to school in a full-time, traditional instruction model.

== Academics ==
Green Hill High School offers courses in English, Science, Mathematics, Social Studies, World Languages, Fine Arts, Physical Education, and Career & Technical Education. Classes are offered at standard-level, as well as Honors, Advanced Placement (AP), Dual Enrollment (DE), Local Dual Credit (LDC), and Statewide Dual Credit (SDC). The school offers a Collegiate Academy, which allows students to enroll in advanced academic courses throughout high school in preparation for post-secondary education.

In 2022, Green Hill High School was awarded Reward School status by the Tennessee Department of Education.

== Extracurricular activities ==
Green Hill High School has 32 student-led clubs. Clubs have a faculty sponsor and must establish sufficient interest and regular meeting times throughout the school year, either before or after school.

== Athletics ==
Green Hill High School offers a number of athletic teams and opportunities. In the time since the school's opening, teams from many sports have won regional and district titles and championships.

=== Fall ===
The following fall sports are offered:

- Cross Country (Varsity)
- Football (Varsity and Freshman)
- Golf (Boys and Girls Varsity)
- Girls Soccer (Varsity and Junior Varsity)
- Swimming (Varsity)
- Volleyball (Varsity, Junior Varsity, and Freshman)

=== Winter ===
The following winter sports are offered:

- Boys Basketball (Varsity and Freshman)
- Girls Basketball (Varsity and Junior Varsity)
- Bowling (Boys and Girls Varsity)
- Swimming (Varsity)
- Boys Wrestling (Varsity)
- Girls Wrestling (Varsity)

=== Spring ===
The following spring sports are offered:

- Baseball (Varsity)
- Boys Soccer (Varsity and Junior Varsity)
- Softball (Varsity and Junior Varsity) - 2023-24 TSSAA Class 4A State Champions
- Tennis (Boys and Girls Varsity)
- Track and Field (Varsity)
- Lacrosse (Varsity)

=== Rivalries ===
When GHHS was completed in 2020, hundreds of students from Mt. Juliet High School were rezoned, creating a natural rivalry. They compete for the Mayor's Cup in football each season. On October 29, 2021, GHHS defeated MJHS in their first-ever football game at Elzie D. Patton Stadium. On October 28, 2022, MJHS won the TSSAA Region 5-5A football championship, after their 26–19 victory over GHHS. In 2024, both teams came in undefeated, with Green Hill winning the Region 4-6A title 12–0. Green Hill owns a 4-1 all-time record against the Bears.
