= Elsmore =

Elsmore can refer to:

- Elsmore, New South Wales, Australia
- Elsmore, Kansas, United States
- Bronwyn Elsmore (living), New Zealand writer and lecturer in religious studies
- Philip Elsmore (1937–2025), British television presenter and actor
- Nik Elsmore (born 1977), British rally driver
- Guy Elsmore (born 1966), British Anglican priest

== See also ==
- Elmore (disambiguation)
- Elsmere (disambiguation)
- Ellesmere (disambiguation)
