= Elmore Houses =

Historic houses in Connecticut, United States

- U.S. National Register of Historic Places
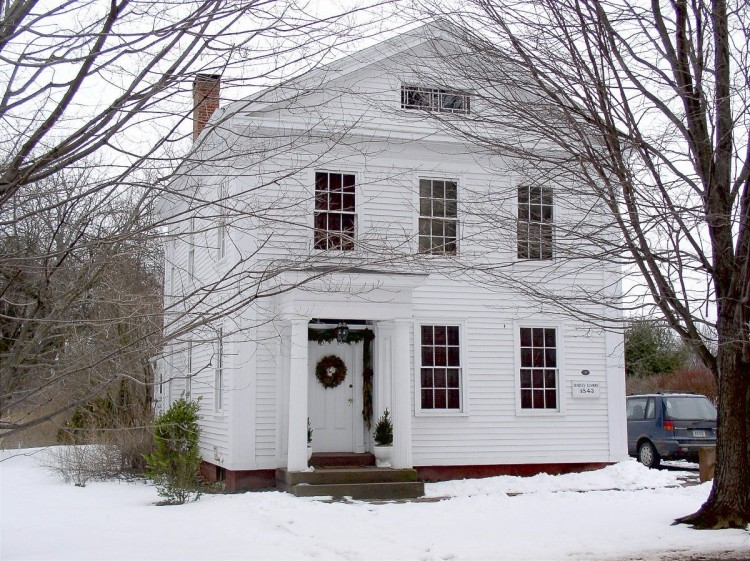

- Location within Connecticut Location within the United States
- Location: 78 and 87 Long Hill Road, South Windsor, Connecticut
- Coordinates: 41°48′10″N 72°35′42″W
- Area: 2 acres (0.81 ha)
- Built: 1843
- Built by: Burnham, Dennis
- Architectural style: Greek Revival, Colonial
- NRHP reference No.: 85001832
- Added to NRHP: August 23, 1985

The Elmore Houses are a pair of historic farmhouses at 78 and 87 Long Hill Road in South Windsor, Connecticut, United States. The two houses, one built before 1819 and restyled in the 1840s, and the other one built new in the 1840s, are locally important rural examples of Greek Revival architecture. They were listed on the National Register of Historic Places in 1985.

== Description and history ==
The Elmore Houses are located on southwestern South Windsor, on either side of Long Hill Road just south of its crossing of Interstate 291. Number 78 is the older of the two houses: it is a 2 1/2-story wood-frame structure, with a gabled roof, central chimney, and an exterior of asbestos siding over original wooden clapboards. The main entrance is at the center of its five-bay facade; it has a Greek Revival surround built around the entrance, which is topped by a more Federal appearing fanlight. The interior follows a somewhat typical Georgian Colonial plan, with a narrow vestibule leading to chambers on either side of the chimney. It differs from that plan in not appearing to ever have had a winding staircase in the vestibule, an otherwise common feature.

Number 87 is a more straightforward example of Greek Revival architecture, with a front-gable roof and three-bay facade. The main entrance is in the leftmost bay, sheltered by a finely styled portico. The gable end above is fully pedimented, with a rectangular fixed window at its center.

The house at number 78 was acquired in 1816 by Sally Elmore Burnham, which is the first documented record of its existence. It was probably built at an earlier date by another member of the Elmore family. In the 1840s, Burnham's nephew Timothy restyled that house in the Greek Revival style, and Dennis Burnham, a family relative who was a builder based in Hartford, built the house at number 87. The land that both houses stand on was associated with the Elmore family and descendants from the 17th to 20th centuries.

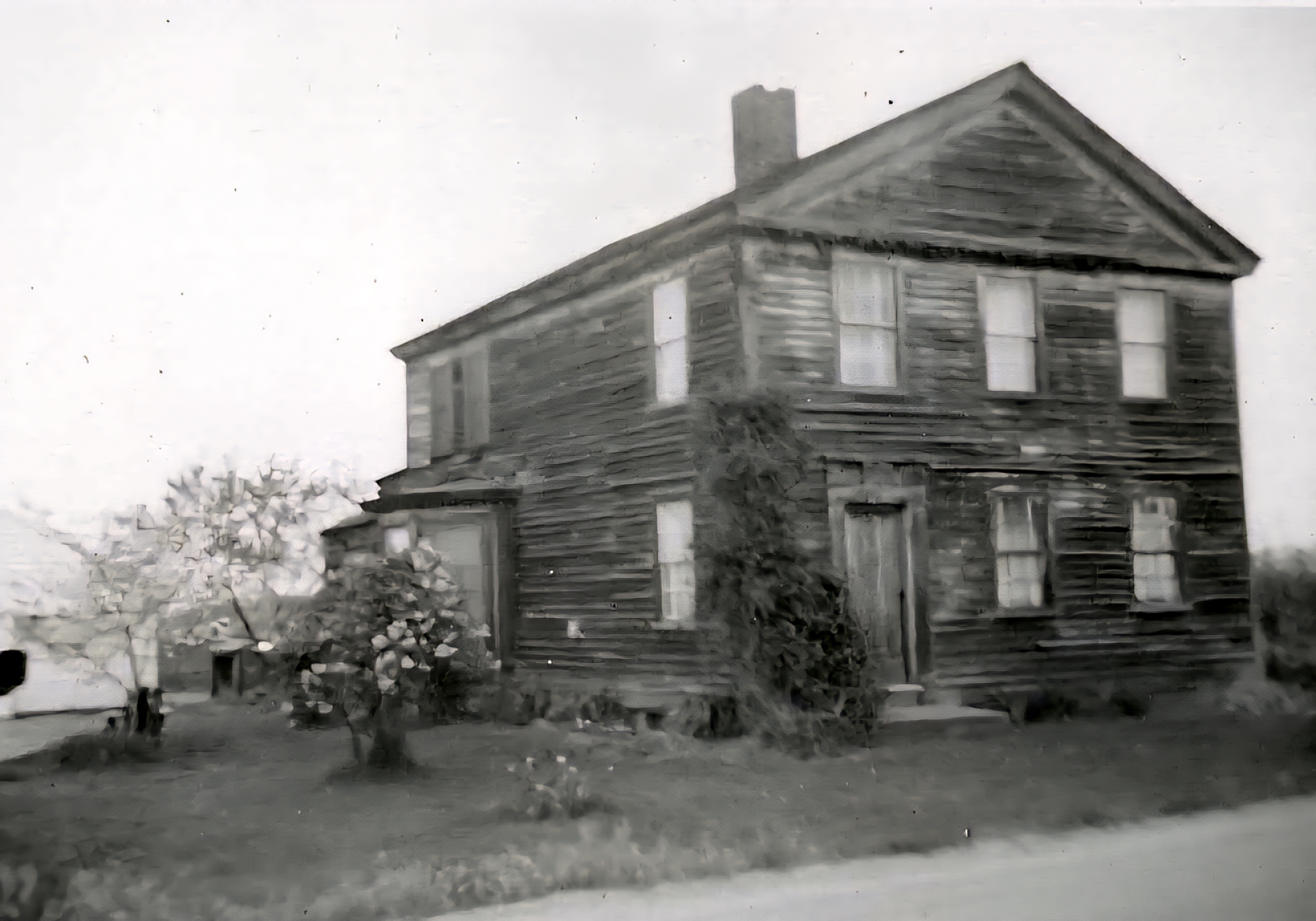
Samuel Elmore Home (prior to 1950s renovations)

== Additional houses ==
Although not on a historical registry, the house that sits at 19 Long Hill Road was built by Samuel Elmore in 1836. It is a two-and-one-half story Greek Revival-style house with a side hall plan. The openings in the facade are evenly dispersed across it, and those on the second floor line up with those on the first. A small square bay is attached to the rear of one side. A one story ell is located at the back, with the ridge of its roof running parallel to the ridge on the roof of the main block. The ell has been expanded over time. The building sits on a brick foundation.

== See also ==
- National Register of Historic Places listings in Hartford County, Connecticut
