= Ashford, Wisconsin =

- Town
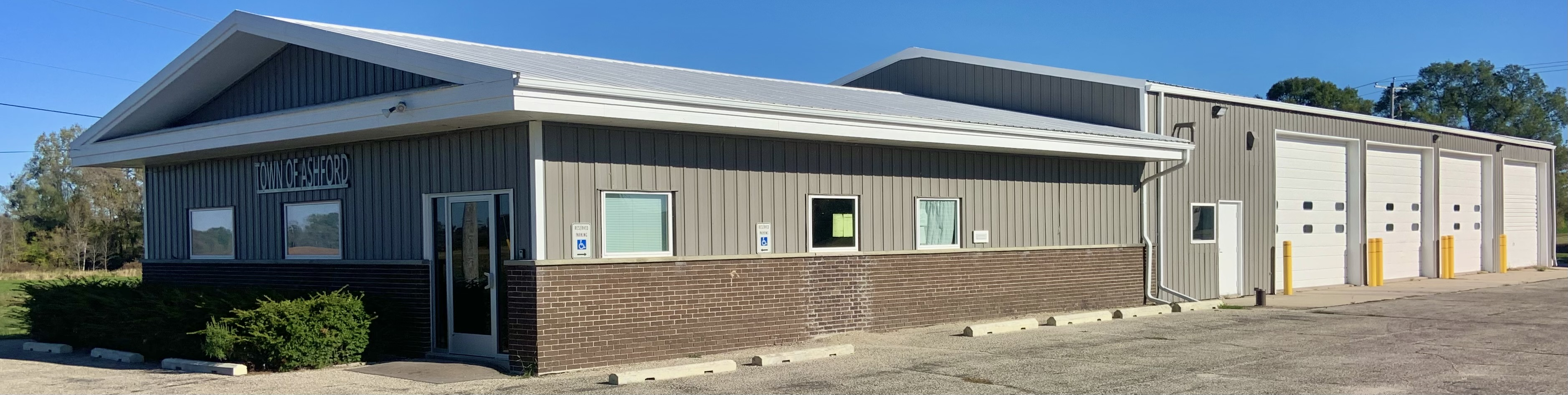
- Ashford Town Hall

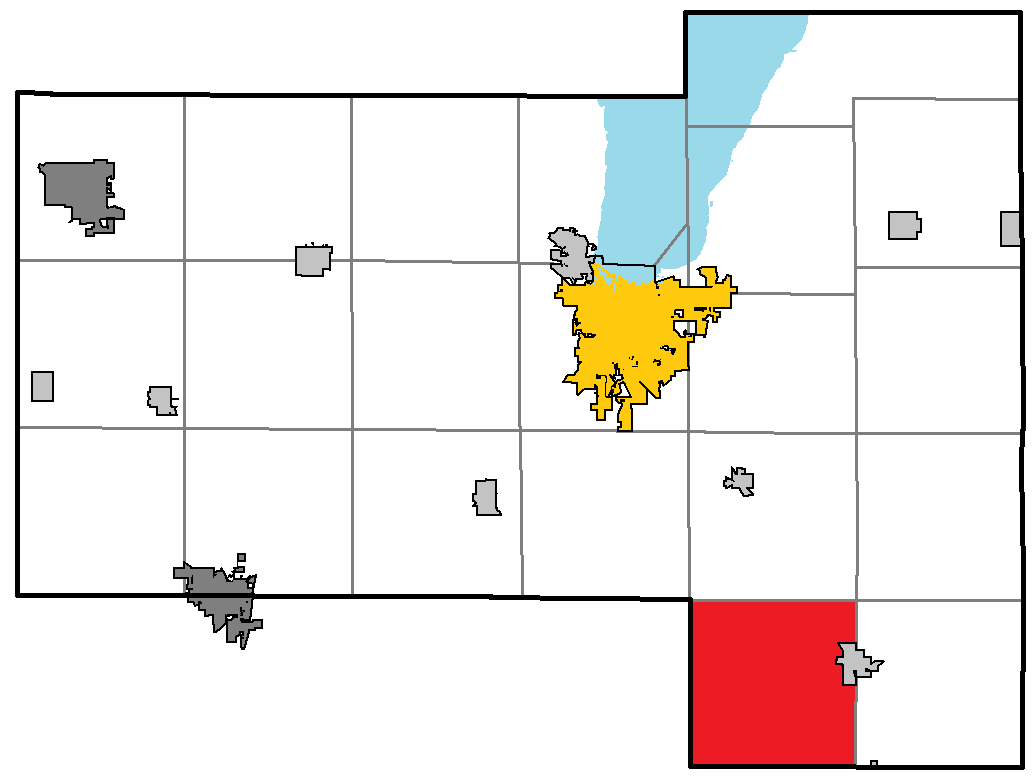
- Location of Ashford, within Fond du Lac County
- Coordinates: 43°35′N 88°20′W
- Country: United States
- State: Wisconsin
- County: Fond du Lac

Area
  - Total: 35.8 sq mi (92.8 km^{2})
  - Land: 35.8 sq mi (92.6 km^{2})
  - Water: 0.077 sq mi (0.2 km^{2})
- Elevation: 1,014 ft (309 m)

Population (2000)
  - Total: 1,722
  - Density: 48.2/sq mi (18.6/km^{2})
- Time zone: UTC-6 (Central (CST))
  - Summer (DST): UTC-5 (CDT)
- Area code: 920
- FIPS code: 55-03150
- GNIS feature ID: 1582721
- Website: http://www.townofashford.com

Ashford is a town in Fond du Lac County, Wisconsin, United States. The population was 1,722 at the 2020 census. The unincorporated communities of Ashford and Elmore are located in the town.

== History ==
Ashford was originally named Chili until the Wisconsin State Legislature changed the name to Ashford on January 26, 1854, on account of area ash trees.

== Geography ==
According to the United States Census Bureau, the town has a total area of 35.8 square miles (92.8 km^{2}), of which 35.8 square miles (92.6 km^{2}) is land and 0.1 square miles (0.2 km^{2}; 0.20%) is water.

== Demographics ==
At the 2000 census there were 1,773 people, 641 households, and 498 families living in the town. The population density was 49.6 people per square mile (19.1/km^{2}). There were 668 housing units at an average density of 18.7 per square mile (7.2/km^{2}). The racial makeup of the town was 97.69% White, 0.11% African American, 0.34% Native American, 0.23% Asian, 0.73% from other races, and 0.90% from two or more races. Hispanic or Latino of any race were 1.13%.

Of the 641 households 33.5% had children under the age of 18 living with them, 69.3% were married couples living together, 4.8% had a female householder with no husband present, and 22.3% were non-families. 16.8% of households were one person and 5.1% were one person aged 65 or older. The average household size was 2.77 and the average family size was 3.14.

The age distribution was 25.2% under the age of 18, 7.5% from 18 to 24, 31.5% from 25 to 44, 24.8% from 45 to 64, and 11.0% 65 or older. The median age was 38 years. For every 100 females, there were 103.3 males. For every 100 females age 18 and over, there were 106.2 males.

The median household income was $50,708 and the median family income was $55,950. Males had a median income of $37,228 versus $23,162 for females. The per capita income for the town was $21,777. About 1.9% of families and 3.0% of the population were below the poverty line, including 3.1% of those under age 18 and 5.0% of those age 65 or over.
