= Kenny Winfree =

American folk singer and songwriter (born 1954)

Kenny Winfree (1954 - 2021) is an American folk singer and songwriter. He is best known for his labor classic, “I’m A Union Card.” Joe Glazer called Winfree, “this generation’s Woody Guthrie” and wrote “I felt like Kenny had Woody’s knack for writing catchy, moving songs with a message. His songs are easy to remember.”

Winfree started out working as a textile worker at the Lebanon Woolen Mill in his hometown of Lebanon, Tennessee. His father worked at the same mill for 45 years, and his mother and several uncles had worked there as well. The Amalgamated Clothing and Textile Workers Union (now UNITE HERE), heard Winfree's music and sent it to Joe Glazer in Washington, D.C. Glazer was impressed with Winfree's bluegrass style labor songs, he decided to have him record on his “Collector” label.

Winfree recorded two solo albums, Down At The Union Hall (1986), and Blue Collar Bluegrass (1991). In 2006 the Smithsonian re-released both albums on its Folkways label. Glazer himself recorded two of Winfree's songs, “I’m A Union Card” and “Down At The Union Hall.” Glazer included both songs on his Joe Glazer Sings Labor Songs II album. A live version of “Down At The Union Hall” appears on Glazer's Bricklayin Union Man album. The D.C. Labor Chorus performed “I’m A Union Card” at the Joe Glazer Memorial Concert in December 2006, shortly after Glazer's passing.

Winfree's version of “I’m A Union Card” is included in the Classic Labor Songs From Smithsonian Folkways CD released in May 2006. Winfree has performed at numerous union conventions, meetings, the Smithsonian Institution, and on many radio and TV shows including “Singing For The Union” which aired Labor Day 1985 on PBS.

Winfree worked at a large aircraft plant in Texas and is a member of the Dallas/Fort Worth Professional Musicians Association / American Federation of Musicians Local 72-147.

Winfee died in fall of 2021.

== Discography ==
Solo albums:

- Down at the Union Hall (1986) (2006) Smithsonian Folkways Recordings Catalog #COLL01941
- Blue Collar Bluegrass (1991) (2006) Smithsonian Folkways Recordings Catalog #COLL01949

Compilations:

- Classic Labor Songs from Smithsonian Folkways (2006) Catalog #SFW40166
- We Just Come to Work Here (2006) Smithsonian Folkways Recordings Catalog #COLL1953
