= Henry Elmore =

- Third baseman
- Born: December 6, 1941
- Batted: Left Threw: Right

Negro league baseball debut
- 1960, for the Philadelphia Stars

Last appearance
- 1962, for the Birmingham Black Barons

Teams
- Philadelphia Stars (1960); Birmingham Black Barons (1961–1962)

Henry Elmore (December 2, 1941 – January 8, 2023) was an American third baseman who played in the Negro leagues from 1960 to 1962. During his tenure, Elmore played for the Philadelphia Stars and Birmingham Black Barons before the league dissolved. He subsequently enjoyed an extended career with the Birmingham Industrial League along with other former Negro leaguers.

Born in Birmingham, Alabama, Elmore first started playing baseball while attending Ulmer High School. Inspired by great-uncle and former Negro leaguer Jim "Shifty" West, he signed with the Philadelphia Stars of the Negro leagues in 1960, primarily playing second and third base. The following season, Elmore joined the Birmingham Black Barons, having the opportunity to play with Satchel Paige and Reece "Goose" Tatum. Elmore was a part of the roster for two years before the Negro leagues dissolved following the 1962 season.

After Negro league baseball, Elmore became employed at the Stackham Valves and Fittings Company in Birmingham where he worked for 35 years. He continued to play baseball in the Birmingham Industrial League for 12 years, and often lead the league in batting average. Elmore later married and had five children.
