= Mount Juliet High School =

Public secondary school in Wilson County, Tennessee United States

Mt. Juliet High School
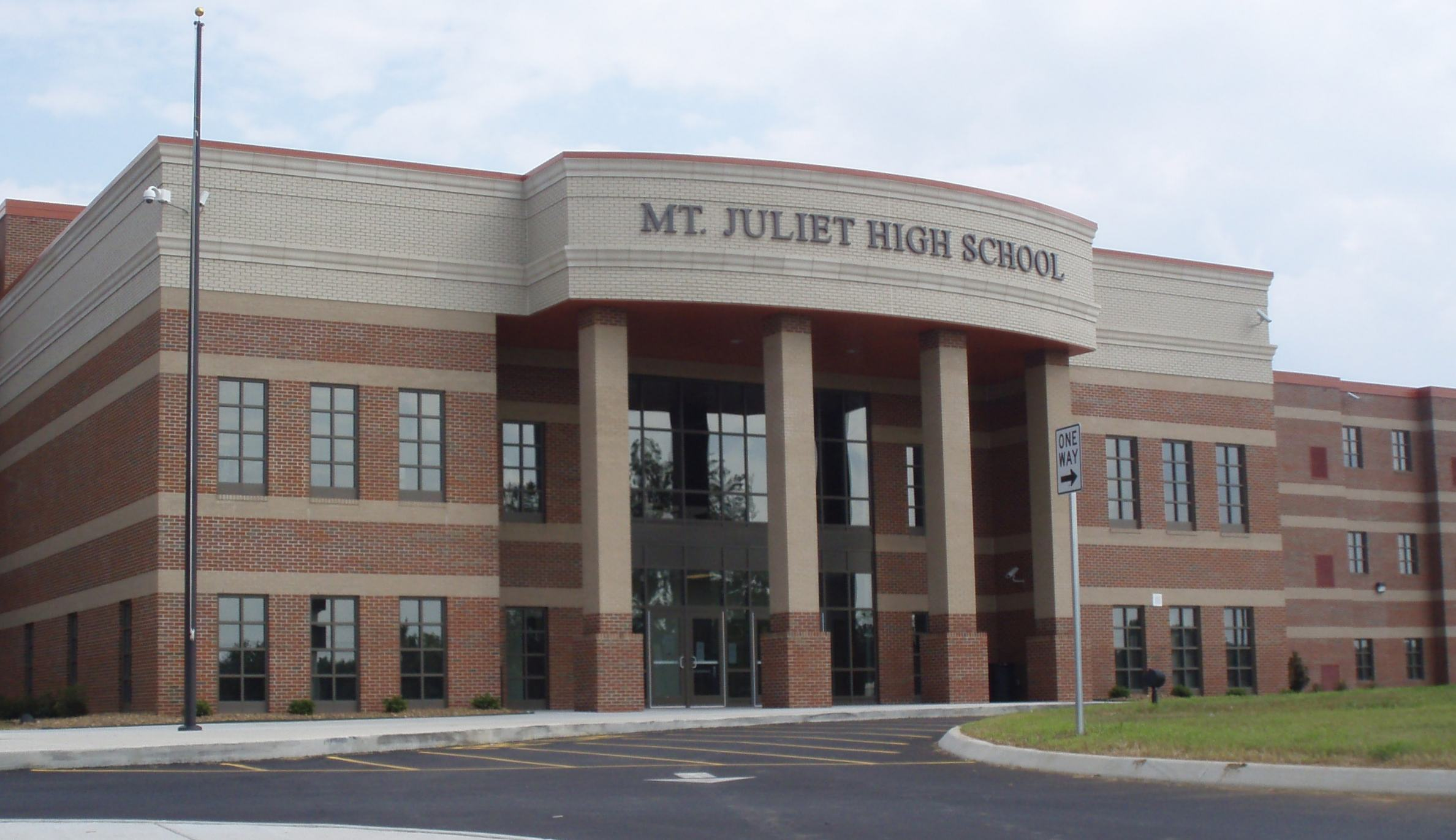

Location
- 1875 Golden Bear Gateway; Mt. Juliet, Tennessee 37122; 36.21625°N 86.49354°W

Information
- Type: Public grades 9–12
- Motto: Bear Pride Mt. Juliet High.
- Established: 1854; 172 years ago
- Principal: Ryan Hill
- Teaching staff: 89.62 (FTE)
- Enrollment: 1,675 (2023–2024)
- Student to teacher ratio: 18.69
- Colors: Black and Vegas gold
- Team name: Golden Bears
- Website: https://mjhs.wcschools.com/

Mt. Juliet High School (MJHS) is a public high school located in Wilson County, Tennessee. It is not within Mt. Juliet city limits, but it serves parts of southern and eastern Mt. Juliet. Ryan Hill, a 2005 MJHS graduate, became the principal July 1, 2023.

In 2008, MJHS moved from its previous building on N Mt. Juliet Road to a new building located at 1800 Curd Road. The old building became Mt. Juliet Middle School. The address changed to 1875 Golden Bear Gateway in 2017.

The school's slogan is "Bear Pride Mt. Juliet High."

== Academics ==
Mt. Juliet High School offers a variety of core and elective classes. These include over 25 Advanced Placement courses, 9 career and technical education programs, 16 fine arts programs, and 27 dual enrollment classes through 3 different colleges and universities.

== Athletics ==
Mt. Juliet offers 21 separate athletic programs. Mt. Juliet competes in Tennessee Secondary School Athletic Association Division 1, District 9-AAA in all sports except football. In football, Mt. Juliet participates in the TSSAA Division 1, 6A Region 4.

=== Football ===
Mt. Juliet fielded its first football team in 1923–24 and was coached by Jack Gifford. The high school has fielded a team every year since 1936. The team is coached by Trey Perry.

Mt. Juliet has appeared in the TSSAA playoffs 17 times. In 2012, Mt. Juliet went to the 6A state semifinals, losing to eventual state champion Memphis Whitehaven 41–35.

=== Baseball ===
2001–2018: Mark Purvis (516–194). Under Purvis, Mt. Juliet went to eight TSSAA sectional games and won the District 9-AAA championship nine times (2006, 2007, 2008, 2009, 2010, 2011, 2012, 2013, 2016 & 2018). Over 100 of Purvis' players played collegiately, including nine in the SEC—eight to Vanderbilt University and one to the University of Tennessee.

2019: Mark Decker (349–181) replaced Mark Purvis.

=== Girls Basketball ===
TSSAA Girls Basketball AAA State Champs 1977, 1983, and 2005

=== Rivalries ===
Wilson Central, MJHS's rival school, opened in 2001. When Wilson Central opened, the area was re-zoned, moving some Mt. Juliet students to Wilson Central.

Similarly, Green Hill High School (GHHS) was completed in 2020, rezoning hundreds of students from MJHS. On October 29, 2021, GHHS defeated MJHS in their first-ever football game at Elzie D. Patton stadium. However, just under a year later, on October 28, 2022, MJHS won the TSSAA Region 5-5A football championship and was presented the Mayor's Cup, after their 26-19 victory over GHHS.

== Extracurricular activities ==
Mt. Juliet High School has 42 student-led clubs. Clubs are faculty-sponsored and meet regularly throughout the year.

== Notable alumni ==
- Levi Brown, quarterback for the Buffalo Bills
- Amanda Butler, former head women's basketball coach at Clemson University and former head coach at University of Florida
- Alysha Clark (born 1987), American-Israeli basketball player for the Israeli team Elitzur Ramla and the Seattle Storm of the Women's National Basketball Association (WNBA)
- Caleb Cotham, baseball player
- Jared Followill, bassist from band Kings of Leon
- Matthew Followill, guitarist from band Kings of Leon
- Ben Hayslip, 2011 and 2012 ASCAP Country Music Songwriter of the Year
- Taylor Hill, professional baseball player
- Michael Jasper, head football coach at Bethel University, football player for the New York Giants.
- Dale Wainwright, Texas Supreme Court Justice (2003–12)
- Barry E. Wilmore, NASA astronaut
