= Ellesmere College (disambiguation) =

Ellesmere College is a school in Shropshire, England.

Ellesmere may also refer to:

- Ellesmere College, Leeston, New Zealand
- Ellesmere College, Leicester, England
