= Joan Elmore =

American horseshoes pitcher

Joan Elmore is a horseshoes pitcher from Mount Juliet, Tennessee. She is a ten-time horseshoes champion and NHPA Hall of Famer.

== Information ==
Elmore became interested in horseshoes after hearing about Tennessee State Championship in her area. She began playing in fall 1996 as a way to bond with her daughter. In her first tournament, she threw ringers at a 60-percent clip. She then won the Tennessee state championship in her rookie year and is the first Tennessean to win the Women's World Horseshoe Tournament. In 2009, she was inducted into the NHPA Hall of Fame. She had won five Women's National Horseshoe Pitchers Association World Tournaments by 2012 and had won 10 NHPA World Tournaments by 2021.

Elmore is also a three-time Women's Indoor Horseshoes Champion (1998-2002) and a twenty-time Tennessee State Women's Champion (1997-2019). She has also won 14 total NHPA World Tournament Preliminary Class and Championships.
