= Elmore Township =

Elmore Township may refer to the following townships in the United States:

- Elmore Township, Daviess County, Indiana
- Elmore Township, Faribault County, Minnesota
