= Elmore, Wisconsin =

- Unincorporated community
- Location within Wisconsin Location within the United States
- Coordinates: 43°34′30″N 88°18′10″W
- Country: United States
- State: Wisconsin
- County: Fond du Lac
- Elevation: 1,027 ft (313 m)
- Time zone: UTC-6 (Central (CST))
  - Summer (DST): UTC-5 (CDT)
- Area code: 920
- GNIS feature ID: 1564579

Elmore is an unincorporated community in the town of Ashford, Fond du Lac County, Wisconsin, United States. Elmore was originally known as Leglerville after founder Ulrich Legler, who built a sawmill in the community in 1857. The community later took its current name to honor Andrew Elmore, who represented the area in the Wisconsin Assembly in 1859 and 1860.
