= Joann Elmore =

American physician-scientist

Joann G. Elmore, MD, MPH
- Education: San Diego State University, Stanford University, Yale University
- Occupations: Physician, researcher, professor
- Known for: Cancer screening, diagnostic accuracy, medical technology, statistical methods, medical education, computer image analyses and AI/machine learning, health IT and OpenNotes, patient engagement and health care delivery.

Joann G. Elmore is a distinguished American physician-scientist at the University of California, Los Angeles (UCLA) specializing in cancer screening and diagnostics, particularly for breast cancer and melanoma, and recognized for her groundbreaking work using AI and machine learning to improve diagnostic accuracy and reduce physician variability. Elmore has made significant contributions to utilizing medical technology and health IT, such as electronic medical records, with a focus on patient engagement and healthcare delivery.

She is currently a Professor and Endowed Chair in Health Care Delivery for The Rosalinde and Arthur Gilbert Foundation at the David Geffen School of Medicine at UCLA, Professor of Health Policy and Management at the UCLA Fielding School of Public Health, and Director of the National Clinician Scholars Program at UCLA. She is also a member of the UCLA Jonsson Comprehensive Cancer Center and holds additional appointments with the Division of General Internal Medicine & Health Services Research at UCLA and the UCLA Division of Dermatology.

== Education and career ==
Elmore received her M.D. from the Stanford University School of Medicine and her M.P.H. in epidemiology from Yale University. She completed her residency training in internal medicine at Yale-New Haven Hospital, with advanced epidemiology training from the Yale School of Epidemiology and Public Health. At Yale, she was also a Robert Wood Johnson Foundation (RWJF) generalist physician faculty scholar and served as a faculty member for several years. In 1995, she joined the faculty of the University of Washington, where she was the head of the general internal medicine section at Harborview Medical Center from 2000 to 2010. In 2004, she was elected a member of the American Society for Clinical Investigation. In November 2017, she was named director of the UCLA National Clinician Scholars Program.

Previously, she held faculty and leadership positions at the University of Washington, Fred Hutchinson Research Center, Group Health Research Institute, Yale University and was the Associate Director and member of the National Advisory Committee for the Robert Wood Johnson Clinical Scholars Program at Yale and University of Washington.

Elmore is a practicing primary care physician and board certified in internal medicine by the American Board of Internal Medicine . Her clinical expertise allows her to serve on many national and international committees. She is Editor in Chief for Adult Primary Care at Up-To-Date and enjoys seeing patients as a primary care internist and teaching clinical medicine to students and residents.

== Research ==
Elmore's research has centered on accuracy and efficiency of cancer screening and diagnoses (for both breast and melanoma) through the integration of technology. Her research over the years also addresses the broader aspects of healthcare, including the use of OpenNotes to enhance patient engagement and the development of innovative medical education strategies. She has published several studies on diagnostic accuracy of cancer screening and medical tests in addition to AI/machine learning, using computer-aided tools to aid in the early detection process of high-risk cancers Notably, her research on physician variability has led to significant insights into how clinician can make more consistent and accurate diagnostic decisions, to expand scientific understanding of improving methods in diagnostic accuracy by including potential patient, physician, technology and system factors associated with accuracy.

She has led several multi-site R01 studies evaluating diagnostic accuracy of radiologists and pathologists and continues to secure NIH awards as well as private, non-profit foundation funding. Her current studies involve describing diagnostic variability and the impact of new technology and she continues to publish major articles in cancer screening and new screening modalities, including new work into AI and machine learning. Ultimately, Elmore wants to harness technology to provide a better scientific understanding of the physician decision-making process.

Elmore has made public appearances on CBS News to inform the public on diagnostic accuracy in breast cancer screening with the use of AI machine learning techniques. Elmore was also awarded for her Open Notes initiative and research to make doctor's notes more accessible to patients, to increase patient empowerment and health care transparency.

== Selected publications ==
Radiology

- Elmore JG, Wells CK, Lee CH, Howard DH, Feinstein AR. Variability in radiologists' interpretations of mammograms. N Engl J Med. 1994 Dec 1;331(22):1493-9. doi: 10.1056/NEJM199412013312206. PMID: 7969300.
- Elmore JG, Wells CK, Howard DH, Feinstein AR. The impact of clinical history on mammographic interpretations. JAMA. 1997 Jan 1;277(1):49–52. PMID 8980210.
- Elmore JG, Barton MB, Moceri VM, Polk S, Arena PJ, Fletcher SW. Ten-year risk of false positive screening mammograms and clinical breast examinations. N Engl J Med. 1998 Apr 16;338(16):1089–96. doi: 10.1056/NEJM199804163381601. PMID 9545356.
- Elmore JG, Armstrong K, Lehman CD, Fletcher SW. Screening for breast cancer. JAMA. 2005 Mar 9;293(10):1245–56. doi: 10.1001/jama.293.10.1245. PMID 15755947; PMCID: PMC3149836.

Computer and Machine Imaging Analysis/CAD

- Fenton JJ, Taplin SH, Carney PA, Abraham L, Sickles EA, D'Orsi C, Berns EA, Cutter G, Hendrick RE, Barlow WE, Elmore JG. Influence of computer-aided detection on performance of screening mammography. N Engl J Med. 2007 Apr 5;356(14):1399-409. doi: 10.1056/NEJMoa066099. PMID 17409321; PMCID: PMC3182841.
- Mercan E, Aksoy S, Shapiro LG, Weaver DL, Brunyé TT, Elmore JG. Localization of Diagnostically Relevant Regions of Interest in Whole Slide Images: a Comparative Study. J Digit Imaging. 2016 Aug;29(4):496–506. doi: 10.1007/s10278-016-9873-1. PMID 26961982; PMCID: PMC4942394.
- Mercan E, Shapiro LG, Brunyé TT, Weaver DL, Elmore JG. Characterizing Diagnostic Search Patterns in Digital Breast Pathology: Scanners and Drillers. J Digit Imaging. 2018 Feb;31(1):32–41. doi: 10.1007/s10278-017-9990-5. PMID 28681097; PMCID: PMC5788829.
- Mercan E, Mehta S, Bartlett J, Shapiro LG, Weaver DL, Elmore JG. Assessment of Machine Learning of Breast Pathology Structures for Automated Differentiation of Breast Cancer and High-Risk Proliferative Lesions. JAMA Netw Open. 2019 Aug 2;2(8):e198777. doi: 10.1001/jamanetworkopen.2019.8777. PMID 31397859; PMCID: PMC6692690.

OpenNotes/Communication with Patients

- Walker J, Darer JD, Elmore JG, Delbanco T. The road toward fully transparent medical records. N Engl J Med. 2014 Jan 2;370(1):6–8. doi: 10.1056/NEJMp1310132. Epub 2013 Dec 4. PMID: 24304001.
- Elmore JG, Ganschow PS, Geller BM. Communication between patients and providers and informed decision making. J Natl Cancer Inst Monogr. 2010;2010(41):204-9. doi: 10.1093/jncimonographs/lgq038. PMID 20956831; PMCID: PMC3140849.
- Lee BS, Walker J, Delbanco T, Elmore JG. Transparent Electronic Health Records and Lagging Laws. Ann Intern Med. 2016 Aug 2;165(3):219-20. doi: 10.7326/M15-2827. Epub 2016 May 24. PMID 27214266; PMCID: PMC7061764.

Pathology

- Elmore JG, Longton GM, Carney PA, Geller BM, Onega T, Tosteson AN, Nelson HD, Pepe MS, Allison KH, Schnitt SJ, O'Malley FP, Weaver DL. Diagnostic concordance among pathologists interpreting breast biopsy specimens. JAMA. 2015 Mar 17;313(11):1122–32. doi: 10.1001/jama.2015.1405. PMID 25781441; PMCID: PMC4516388.
- Elmore JG, Barnhill RL, Elder DE, Longton GM, Pepe MS, Reisch LM, Carney PA, Titus LJ, Nelson HD, Onega T, Tosteson ANA, Weinstock MA, Knezevich SR, Piepkorn MW. Pathologists' diagnosis of invasive melanoma and melanocytic proliferations: observer accuracy and reproducibility study. BMJ. 2017 Jun 28;357:j2813. doi: 10.1136/bmj.j2813. Erratum in: BMJ. 2017 Aug 8;358:j3798. doi: 10.1136/bmj.j3798. PMID 28659278; PMCID: PMC5485913.

Additional Research

- Trivedi TK, Liu C, Antonio ALM, Wheaton N, Kreger V, Yap A, Schriger D, Elmore JG. Injuries Associated With Standing Electric Scooter Use. JAMA Netw Open. 2019 Jan 4;2(1):e187381. doi: 10.1001/jamanetworkopen.2018.7381. PMID 30681711; PMCID: PMC6484536.
- Binswanger IA, Stern MF, Deyo RA, Heagerty PJ, Cheadle A, Elmore JG, Koepsell TD. Release from prison—a high risk of death for former inmates. N Engl J Med. 2007 Jan 11;356(2):157-65. doi: 10.1056/NEJMsa064115. Erratum in: N Engl J Med. 2007 Feb 1;356(5):536. PMID 17215533; PMCID: PMC2836121.

== Honors and awards ==
- 1979–1982 Deans List, San Diego State University
- 1981 Outstanding Student Service Award, San Diego State University
- 1981 American Heart Association Research Fellow
- 1982 Lewis Barbato National Award Granted yearly to one student by the American College Health Association
- 1982 Phi Beta Kappa
- 1983–1984 Stanford Alumni Medical Student Research Scholar
- 1986–1987 Stanford McCormick Foundation Women's Research Scholar
- 1986–1987 American Association of University Women Scholar
- 1987 Graduation with Distinction in Research, Stanford School of Medicine
- 1990–1992 Robert Wood Johnson Foundation Clinical Scholar
- 1994–1999 Robert Wood Johnson Foundation Generalist Physician Faculty Scholar (awarded to only 2 researchers per medical school nationally per 4-year period)
- 1997 Outstanding Young Woman of America, Outstanding Young Americans
- 2001–2007 National Advisory Committee, Robert Wood Johnson Foundation Generalist Physician Faculty Scholar Program
- 2004 Elected to the American Society for Clinical Investigation, honorary society of physician-scientists from all medical specialties on the basis of an outstanding record of scholarly achievement in biomedical research.
- 2005 Who's Who in Medical Sciences Education (WWMSE)
- 2006–2007 Marquis Who's Who of American Women, 25th Silver Anniversary Edition
- 2008–2016 National Advisory Committee, Robert Wood Johnson Foundation Clinical Scholars Program
- 2010 National Institute of Health Merit Awardee in recognition of dedicated service to NCI in developing and maintaining evidence-based PDQ cancer information summaries for health professionals and the public.
- 2011–2017 Washington State Health Care Authority, Health Technology Clinical Committee (Member 2011 to 2015; Vice-Chair 2016)
- 2014 Elected to Membership, Association of American Physicians (AAP), an honorary medical society extended to individuals with outstanding credentials in biomedical science and/or translational biomedical research and is limited to 60 persons per year.
- 2014 Inaugural John Q. Sherman Award for Excellence in Patient Engagement (for Open Notes) at the 16th Annual NPSF Patient Safety Congress.
- 2017 5th Annual Health Data Liberator Award from Academy Health. The award recognizes the Open Notes initiative that encourages health care providers to share their visit notes with patients (Elmore is an Executive Committee Member, Open Notes).
- 2017 John M. Eisenberg National Award for Career Achievement in Research (Awarded to one individual each year by the Society of General Internal Medicine for research contributions in research, patient care, or health policy).
- 2020– Association of Academic Radiology (AAR) Clinical Effectiveness in Radiology Research Academic Fellowship (CERRAF) Award Board of Review.
