= Lebanon Special School District =

School district in Tennessee, USA

Address
- 397 North Castle Heights Avenue Lebanon, Tennessee, 37087; United States

District information
- Type: Public
- Grades: PreK–8
- NCES District ID: 4702370

Students and staff
- Students: 3,837
- Teachers: 255.0
- Staff: 339.0
- Student–teacher ratio: 15.05

Other information
- Website: www.lssd.org

Lebanon Special School District (LSSD) is a K-8 school district headquartered in Lebanon, Tennessee.

It serves most of Lebanon and some unincorporated areas. Wilson County Schools operates the high schools that serve the LSSD territory.

== History ==
Scott Benson is the director of the district. In 2019 the school board voted for a one-year renewal of Benson's contract. Benson had been promoted to Interim Assistant Director of the district in 2010.

As of 2021 the district had about 2,000 students.

== Schools ==
Middle schools

- Walter J. Baird Middle School
- Winfree Bryant Middle School – Opened in 2010.

Elementary schools

- Jones Brummett Elementary – Opened in August 2021
  - Capacity of 800; enrollment for fall 2021 was 500–550. Becky Sevier was selected as the first principal. Named for Andy Brummett and Steve Jones
- Castle Heights Elementary
- Byars Dowdy Elementary
- Coles Ferry Elementary
- Sam Houston Elementary
