= Judge Elmore =

Judge Elmore may refer to:

- Christina Elmore (fl. 2010s–2020s), first African American female judge of the Michigan Seventeenth Circuit Court
- Rick Elmore (fl. 1980s–2010s), judge of the North Carolina Court of Appeals
- William Augustus Elmore (1812–1890), lawyer and judge in New Orleans, Louisiana
