= Wilson County Schools =

School district in Tennessee, United States

Location
- 415 Harding Drive Lebanon, Tennessee, 37087; United States
- Coordinates: 36.2025°N 86.283°W

District information
- Type: Public
- Motto: Excellence in all we do!
- Grades: K–12
- Superintendent: Jeff Luttrell
- Schools: 23

Students and staff
- Students: ~20,000
- Teachers: >1,100

Other information
- Size: 9th largest school district in Tennessee
- Website: www.wcschools.com

Wilson County Schools (WCS) is a K–12 school district in Wilson County, Tennessee, United States. The district enrolls nearly 20,000 students and over 1,100 teachers at ten elementary schools, three K-8 schools, four middle schools, and five high schools.

Students who live within the K–8 Lebanon Special School District (LSSD) automatically transition to Lebanon High School in Wilson County Schools after completing their eighth-grade year. Wilson County Schools is the ninth largest school district in the state.

== History and notable events ==
During the 2020 Nashville tornado, which struck Juliet, West Wilson Middle and Stoner Creek Elementary sustained catastrophic damage and were closed for the next two school years. Both schools had to be rebuilt, with demolition and construction starting in 2021.

== Administrators ==
- Jeff Luttrell, Director of Schools

== School board ==
The Wilson County School Board consists of seven board members serving seven zones, each of whom are elected to serve a four-year term.

- Carrie Pfeiffer, Zone 1
- Beth Meyers, Zone 2
- Melissa Lynn, Zone 3
- Joseph Padilla, Zone 4
- Larry Tomlinson, Zone 5
- Kimberly McGee, Zone 6
- Jamie Farough, Zone 7

== Schools ==
=== Elementary schools (K–5) ===
- Elzie Patton Elementary (2008)
- Rutland Elementary (1998)
- Gladeville Elementary (1833)
- Lakeview Elementary (1969)
- Mt. Juliet Elementary (1948)
- Springdale Elementary (2017)
- Stoner Creek Elementary (1987; rebuilt 2022)
- W.A. Wright Elementary (1991)
- Watertown Elementary (1959)
- West Elementary (1872)

=== K–8 schools ===
- Carroll-Oakland Elementary (1978)
- Southside Elementary (1967)
- Tuckers Crossroads Elementary (1914)

=== Middle schools (6–8) ===
- Gladeville Middle School (2019)
- Mt. Juliet Middle School (2002; previously Mt. Juliet Junior High beginning 1967-1968 school year)
- West Wilson Middle School (1976; rebuilt 2022)
- Watertown Middle School (2014)

=== High schools (9–12) ===
- Mt. Juliet High School (1853-1854)
- Lebanon High School (1918)
- Watertown High School (1912)
- Wilson Central High School (2001)
- Green Hill High School (2020)

=== Specialty schools ===
- Barry Tatum Academy
- Wilson County Adult High School (1992)
- Wilson County Adult Learning Center
