= Lebanon, Tennessee =

- City
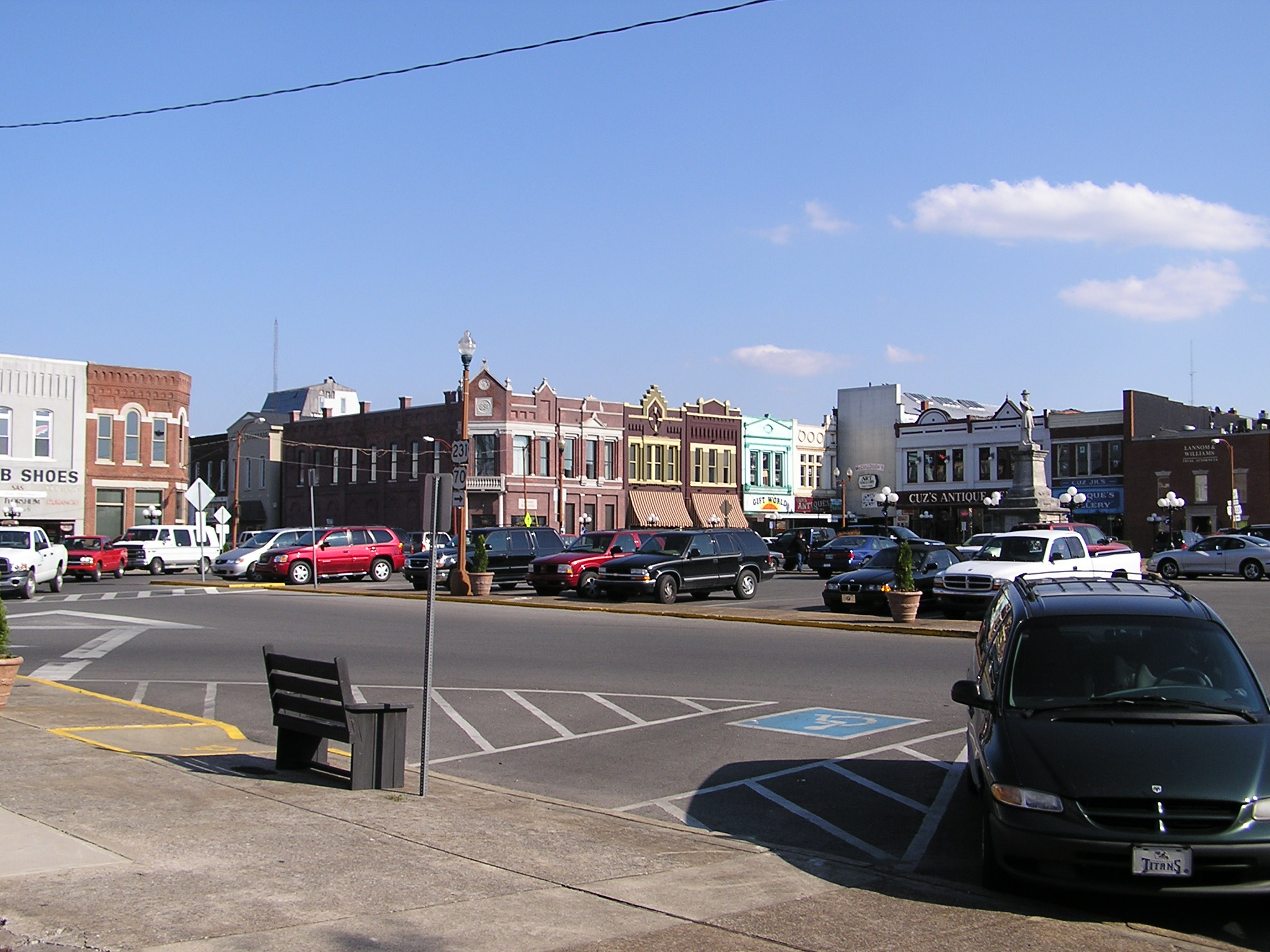
- Lebanon's Town Square with a statue of General Robert H. Hatton at the center

- Flag Logo
- Nickname: "Cedar City"
- Location of Lebanon in Wilson County, Tennessee
- Coordinates: 36°12′29″N 86°19′35″W
- Country: United States
- State: Tennessee
- County: Wilson
- Incorporated: 1801
- Named for: Cedars of Lebanon

Government
  - Mayor: Rick Bell

Area
  - Total: 40.08 sq mi (103.80 km^{2})
  - Land: 40.07 sq mi (103.79 km^{2})
  - Water: 0.0039 sq mi (0.01 km^{2})
- Elevation: 528 ft (161 m)

Population (2020)
  - Total: 38,431 ▲
  - Estimate (2024): 51,501 ▲
  - Density: 959.0/sq mi (370.28/km^{2})
- Time zone: UTC-6 (Central (CST))
  - Summer (DST): UTC-5 (CDT)
- ZIP Codes: 37087, 37088, 37090
- Area codes: 615, 629
- FIPS code: 47-41520
- GNIS feature ID: 1290901
- Website: www.lebanontn.org

Lebanon (/ˈlɛbənən/ LEB-ən-ən) is a city in and the county seat of Wilson County, Tennessee, United States. The population was 38,431 at the 2020 census and has an estimated population of 51,501 as of 2024. Lebanon is located in Middle Tennessee, approximately 25 miles (40 km) east of downtown Nashville. Lebanon is part of the Nashville Metropolitan Statistical Area.

== History ==
The city was incorporated in 1801, and was named after the biblical cedars of Lebanon (Cedrus libani). Local residents have called Lebanon "Cedar City", mostly a reference to the abundance of "cedar" (Juniperus virginiana) trees in the area. The city is home to Cumberland University, a small, private four-year liberal arts institution, and the Nashville Superspeedway, which hosts NASCAR and IndyCar races.

== Geography ==
According to the United States Census Bureau, the city has a total area of 38.63 square miles (100.1 km^{2}), of which 38.5 square miles (100 km^{2}) is land and 0.03% is water. Lebanon is located at Latitude: 36° 12' 17.40" N Longitude: −86° 19' 21.00" W

=== Climate ===
Lebanon has a humid subtropical (Köppen Cfa) climate with mild winters and hot summers. Under the Trewartha climate classification, it is a temperate oceanic (Do) climate due to only 7 months having a mean 50 °F (10 °C) or higher.

Climate data for Lebanon, Tennessee (1991–2020 normals, extremes 1902–2021)
Month	Jan	Feb	Mar	Apr	May	Jun	Jul	Aug	Sep	Oct	Nov	Dec	Year
Record high °F (°C)	77 (25)	82 (28)	89 (32)	92 (33)	96 (36)	108 (42)	110 (43)	111 (44)	109 (43)	98 (37)	85 (29)	79 (26)	111 (44)
Mean maximum °F (°C)	68.0 (20.0)	72.4 (22.4)	79.1 (26.2)	85.0 (29.4)	89.6 (32.0)	94.8 (34.9)	97.5 (36.4)	97.5 (36.4)	94.2 (34.6)	86.8 (30.4)	77.9 (25.5)	69.1 (20.6)	99.2 (37.3)
Mean daily maximum °F (°C)	47.4 (8.6)	51.7 (10.9)	60.7 (15.9)	70.8 (21.6)	79.2 (26.2)	86.9 (30.5)	90.2 (32.3)	89.6 (32.0)	83.6 (28.7)	72.9 (22.7)	60.5 (15.8)	50.7 (10.4)	70.4 (21.3)
Daily mean °F (°C)	37.6 (3.1)	41.0 (5.0)	49.2 (9.6)	58.6 (14.8)	67.6 (19.8)	75.9 (24.4)	79.7 (26.5)	78.2 (25.7)	71.6 (22.0)	59.7 (15.4)	48.7 (9.3)	40.9 (4.9)	59.1 (15.1)
Mean daily minimum °F (°C)	27.8 (−2.3)	30.2 (−1.0)	37.7 (3.2)	46.4 (8.0)	56.1 (13.4)	65.0 (18.3)	69.2 (20.7)	66.9 (19.4)	59.6 (15.3)	46.5 (8.1)	36.8 (2.7)	31.1 (−0.5)	47.8 (8.8)
Mean minimum °F (°C)	8.6 (−13.0)	12.3 (−10.9)	19.8 (−6.8)	29.8 (−1.2)	39.4 (4.1)	51.9 (11.1)	58.2 (14.6)	56.3 (13.5)	43.3 (6.3)	29.9 (−1.2)	20.8 (−6.2)	14.4 (−9.8)	6.7 (−14.1)
Record low °F (°C)	−20 (−29)	−9 (−23)	−2 (−19)	19 (−7)	29 (−2)	38 (3)	47 (8)	43 (6)	33 (1)	20 (−7)	4 (−16)	−11 (−24)	−20 (−29)
Average precipitation inches (mm)	4.67 (119)	4.91 (125)	4.97 (126)	4.93 (125)	5.61 (142)	4.50 (114)	4.84 (123)	3.91 (99)	3.85 (98)	3.39 (86)	3.71 (94)	5.16 (131)	54.45 (1,383)
Average snowfall inches (cm)	0.3 (0.76)	1.0 (2.5)	0.1 (0.25)	0.0 (0.0)	0.0 (0.0)	0.0 (0.0)	0.0 (0.0)	0.0 (0.0)	0.0 (0.0)	0.0 (0.0)	0.0 (0.0)	0.1 (0.25)	1.5 (3.76)
Average precipitation days (≥ 0.01 in)	10.7	9.9	11.1	10.0	10.7	10.2	10.0	8.1	7.3	8.3	8.9	11.4	116.6
Average snowy days (≥ 0.1 in)	0.2	0.7	0.1	0.0	0.0	0.0	0.0	0.0	0.0	0.0	0.0	0.2	1.2
Source: NOAA (snow/snow days 1981–2010)

== Demographics ==
Historical population
Census	Pop.	Note	%±
1850	1,554		—
1870	2,073		—
1880	2,296		10.8%
1890	1,883		−18.0%
1900	1,956		3.9%
1910	3,659		87.1%
1920	4,084		11.6%
1930	4,656		14.0%
1940	5,950		27.8%
1950	7,913		33.0%
1960	10,512		32.8%
1970	12,492		18.8%
1980	11,872		−5.0%
1990	15,208		28.1%
2000	20,235		33.1%
2010	26,190		29.4%
2020	38,431		46.7%
2025 (est.)	53,412	▲	39.0%

=== 2020 census ===
Lebanon racial composition
Race	Number	Percentage
White (non-Hispanic)	28,254	73.52%
Black or African American (non-Hispanic)	4,325	11.25%
Native American	121	0.31%
Asian	571	1.49%
Pacific Islander	13	0.03%
Other/Mixed	1,828	4.76%
Hispanic or Latino	3,319	8.64%

As of the 2020 United States census, there was a population of 38,431, with 11,925 households and 8,349 families residing in the city. The population estimate from the United States census has the population at 44,166 as of July 1, 2022. The population density was 692.0 inhabitants per square mile (267.2/km^{2}). There were 8,693 housing units at an average density of 297.3 per square mile (114.8/km^{2}). There were 11,925 households, out of which 30.9% had children under the age of 18 living with them, 47.7% were married couples living together, 15.0% had a female householder with no husband present, and 33.4% were non-families. 28.5% of all households were made up of individuals, and 11.1% had someone living alone who was 65 years of age or older. The average household size was 2.41 and the average family size was 2.94.

In the city, the population was spread out, with 23.9% under the age of 18, 11.2% from 18 to 24, 29.0% from 25 to 44, 21.7% from 45 to 64, and 14.2% who were 65 years of age or older. The median age was 35 years. For every 100 females, there were 90.6 males. For every 100 females age 18 and over, there were 87.1 males.

The median income for a household in the city was $35,118, and the median income for a family was $45,094. Males had a median income of $31,207 versus $24,420 for females. The per capita income for the city was $20,366. About 9.3% of families and 13.0% of the population were below the poverty line, including 16.0% of those under age 18 and 16.4% of those age 65 or over.

== Economy ==
- Cracker Barrel was founded in Lebanon by Dan Evins in 1969 and has its corporate headquarters there.
- Lochinvar Corporation, a water products manufacturer, is based in Lebanon.
- The city threatened to sue Dell Inc. for eliminating 700 of the 1,000 jobs the company proffered as part of a tax deal on which the company later reneged.
- In 2015, Chinese tile company Wonderful Group invested $150 million to build their company's first manufacturing location in North America.
- The fraternity Sigma Pi was headquartered in Lebanon from 2013 until 2019, when it sold the historic Mitchell House to the city of Lebanon.
- In 2022, Tritium DCFC Limited opened a EV fast charger manufacturing plant.

== Arts and culture ==
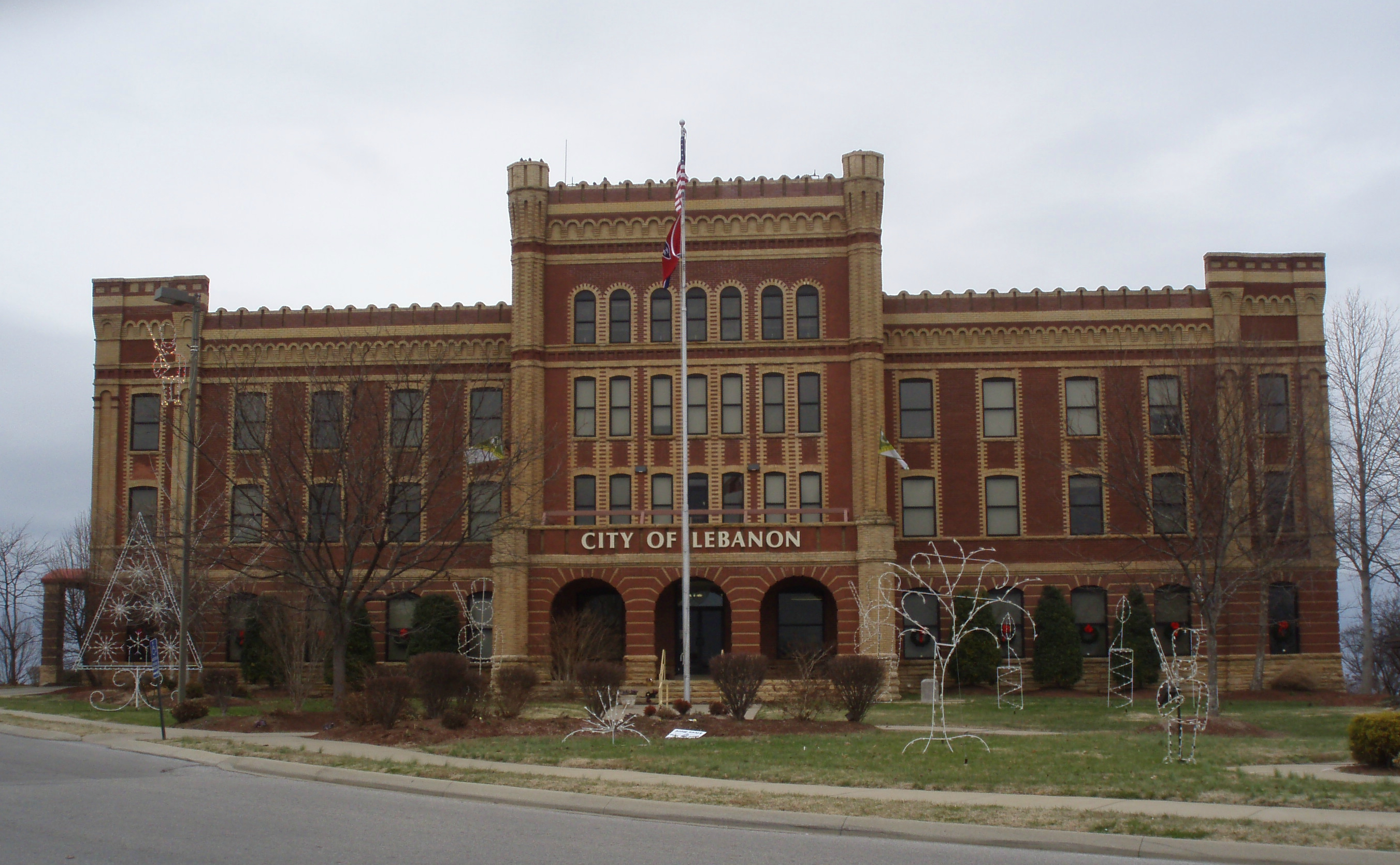
Lebanon City Hall

Lebanon hosts the annual Tennessee State / Wilson County Fair.

== Education ==
The Lebanon Special School District, which includes most of Lebanon, encompasses four elementary schools and two middle schools. Wilson County Schools operates several additional primary and secondary schools in and around Lebanon, including Wilson Central High School and the newly reconstructed Lebanon High School. Small portions of Lebanon are in the Wilson County Schools for all years K–12. Schools serving those portions for K–8 include Carroll-Oakland School and Southside Elementary School. All of Lebanon is zoned to Wilson County Schools for grades 9–12.

Lebanon also has one private school, Friendship Christian School.

Lebanon is also home to Cumberland University, which was founded in 1842. The university has a rich heritage and has produced over eighty representatives and senators, such as Albert Gore Sr. and Thomas Gore. The institution has also produced a Nobel Peace Prize recipient, Cordell Hull, who served as Secretary of State from March 1933 to November 1944.

== Media ==
=== Newspapers ===
- Lebanon Democrat, published Tuesday through Saturday
- The Wilson Post, published twice a week

=== Radio ===
- WANT 98.9 FM, country music/local sports and affairs
- WCOR 1490 AM (simulcast of WANT)
- WRVW 107.5 FM, licensed to Lebanon but primarily serves Nashville
- WTWW, shortwave on several different frequencies

=== Television ===
- WJFB 44, MeTV affiliate targeting Nashville
- WRTN-LD 6, general/local programming

== Infrastructure ==
=== Transportation ===
Interstate 40, runs south of the city, and has three exits that serve Lebanon. U.S. Route 70 connects the city to Nashville to the west and Smithville to the southeast. The western terminus of U.S. Route 70N is located in Lebanon, which connects to Carthage to the east. U.S. Route 231 connects the city to Murfreesboro to the south and Scottsville, Kentucky to the north. Hartmann Drive and Maddox-Simpson Parkway form a partial beltway around the city. The eastern terminus of Interstate 840 is located west of the city. State Route 109 passes west of the city and connects to Gallatin to the north. Secondary State Routes 141 and 266 also pass through Lebanon.

Railroad freight service is provided by the Nashville and Eastern Railroad short line.

Commuter rail service to Nashville began service in 2006 via the Music City Star (now known as the WeGo Star). Lebanon is the eastern terminus of the WeGo Star commuter rail service which runs via scheduled service Mon-Fri. There are two times when trains operate outside the normal service. July 4 fireworks at Riverfront Park calls for a special event train. In addition, when the Tennessee Titans play at home, a special service called Game-Day Express operates.

Rail service began in 1871 with the now defunct Tennessee & Pacific Railroad, which ran to Nashville. The last original passenger train departed Lebanon in 1935.

Lebanon has a municipal airport referenced by FAA Identifier M54. Operating two runways, M54's main runway is asphalt. Runway 1/19 is 5,000 by 100 feet (1,524 by 30 m). Runway 4/22 is turf 1,801 by 150 feet (549 by 46 m).

== Notable people ==
- John Ray Clemmons (born 1977), member of the Tennessee House of Representatives, representing the 55th district, in West Nashville
- Charlie Daniels (1936–2020), country music performer
- Jimmy Duncan (born 1947), U.S. Representative from Tennessee
- Finis Farr (1904–1982), writer and CIA agent
- Ben Hayslip (born 1970), Grammy-nominated country music songwriter
- Haystak (born 1973), rapper
- George Huddleston (1869–1960), U.S. Representative from Alabama, 1915–1937
- Albert Johnson (1930s–1984), first black mayor in New Mexico
- Coco Jones (born 1998), actress
- Thomas Kilby (1865–1943), 36th Governor of Alabama
- Marcellus Neal (1868–1939), first African-American graduate of Indiana University, Bloomington
- Morgan Price (born 2005), gymnast
- Dawson Sutton (born 2006), racing driver
- A C Wharton (born 1944), Mayor of Memphis, 2009–2015
- Kenny Winfree (born 1954), folk music singer-songwriter
- Hunter Wright (born 2001), racing driver

== See also ==
- Lebanon station (Tennessee)
- Cedars of Lebanon State Park
