= Assassination of Martin Luther King Jr. =

1968 murder in Memphis, Tennessee, U.S.

- The immediate aftermath of the shooting of Martin Luther King Jr. on April 4, 1968. This photograph was taken within just seconds of the shooting by photographer Joseph Louw, the only known photographer at the scene.
- Location: 35°08′04″N 90°03′27″W; Lorraine Motel; Memphis, Tennessee, U.S.
- Date: April 4, 1968; 58 years ago 6:01 p.m. (CST (UTC–6))
- Target: Martin Luther King Jr.
- Attack type: Sniper assassination
- Weapon: Remington 760 Gamemaster
- Victim: Martin Luther King Jr.
- Perpetrators: Disputed: James Earl Ray, according to a criminal case; Loyd Jowers and "others, including unspecified governmental agencies", according to a later civil case
- Convictions: Ray: First-degree murder
- Sentence: 99 years imprisonment

On April 4, 1968, at 6:01 p.m. CST, Martin Luther King Jr., the American civil rights leader, was fatally shot at the Lorraine Motel in Memphis, Tennessee. He was rushed to St. Joseph's Hospital, where he was pronounced dead with mortal injuries at 7:05 p.m. at age 39. The assassin, James Earl Ray, an escaped convict from the Missouri State Penitentiary, was arrested on June 8, 1968, at London Heathrow Airport, extradited to the United States and charged with the crime. On March 10, 1969, Ray pleaded guilty and was sentenced to 99 years in the Tennessee State Penitentiary. He later made many attempts to withdraw his guilty plea and to be tried by a jury, but was unsuccessful, before he died in 1998.

The King family and others believe that the assassination was the result of a conspiracy involving the U.S. government, the Mafia, and Memphis police, as alleged by Loyd Jowers in 1993. They believe that Ray was a scapegoat. In 1999, the family filed a wrongful death lawsuit against Jowers for the sum of $10 million. During the trial, both sides presented evidence alleging a government conspiracy. The accused government agencies could not defend themselves or respond because they were not named as defendants. Based on the evidence, the jury concluded that Jowers and others were "part of a conspiracy to kill King" and awarded the family the symbolic $100 they requested in damages. The allegations and the finding of the Memphis jury were later disputed by the United States Department of Justice in 2000 due to a perceived lack of evidence.

The assassination was one of four major assassinations of the 1960s in the United States, coming several years after the assassination of John F. Kennedy in 1963 and the assassination of Malcolm X in 1965, and two months before the assassination of Robert F. Kennedy in June 1968.

== Background ==
=== Death threats ===
As early as the mid-1950s, Martin Luther King Jr. had received death threats because of his prominence in the civil rights movement. He had confronted the risk of death, including a nearly fatal stabbing in 1958, and made its recognition part of his philosophy. He taught that murder could not advance the struggle for equal rights. After the assassination of President Kennedy in 1963, King told his wife, Coretta Scott King, "This is what is going to happen to me also. I keep telling you, this is a sick society."

=== Memphis ===
King traveled to Memphis, Tennessee, in support of striking African-American city sanitation workers. At the time, Memphis paid black workers a wage of just $1 an hour. There were also no city-issued uniforms, no restrooms, no recognized union, and no grievance procedure for the numerous occasions on which they were underpaid.

These unethical conditions were imposed by mayor Henry Loeb, and during his tenure, conditions did not significantly improve. This, along with the deaths of two workers in a garbage-compacting truck on February 1, 1968, caused laborers to conspire to stage a protest on February 11, 1968. The strike took place the following day, and lasted for over two months.

==== King's arrival ====
After being contacted by the Reverend James Lawson Jr., King would fly out to Memphis on March 18 to help the strikers, and announced that he would head a march in a few days. On March 28, King and the Reverend Ralph Abernathy, a colleague and friend of his, then began this peaceful march at the Clayborn Temple. Six thousand people participated in this march, but it would end in violence.

King was deeply upset by the failure of the march and left Memphis the following day, but would return along with Abernathy and administrative assistant Bernard Scott Lee on April 3, although their flight had been delayed due to a bomb threat. King then checked into room 306 at the Lorraine Motel at about 11:20 a.m., before leaving shortly past 12 p.m. to go to a meeting, announcing that he would head another march on April 5.

By that time, tornado warnings had been reported that afternoon, and heavy rainfall hit the city by that night. Despite the weather, King managed to arrive in time to make a planned speech to a gathering at the Mason Temple (also known as the world headquarters of the Church of God in Christ), where around 2,000 people were waiting for him.

==== "I've Been to the Mountaintop" speech ====
At the Mason Temple on the night of April 3, King delivered his famous "I've Been to the Mountaintop" speech, which soon proved to be his last. King had initially asked Abernathy to speak for him, but after seeing the enthusiasm of the crowd at the temple, Abernathy called King and urged him to address the people instead, to which he agreed.

During the speech, he recalled his 1958 attempted assassination, noting that the doctor who treated him had said that because the knife used to stab him was so close to his aorta, any sudden movement, even a sneeze, might have killed him. He referred to a letter written by a young girl who told him that she was happy that he had not sneezed. He used that reference to say:

I, too, am happy that I didn't sneeze. Because if I had sneezed, I wouldn't have been around here in 1960, when students all over the South started sitting-in at lunch counters.... If I had sneezed, I wouldn't have been around here in 1961, when we decided to take a ride for freedom and ended segregation in interstate travel.

As he neared the close, he prophetically referred to the threats against his life:

And then I got to Memphis. And some began to say the threats ... or talk about the threats that were out. What would happen to me from some of our sick white brothers? Well, I don't know what will happen now. We've got some difficult days ahead. But it doesn't matter with me now. Because I've been to the mountaintop. And I don't mind. Like anybody, I would like to live a long life. Longevity has its place. But I'm not concerned about that now. I just want to do God's will. And He's allowed me to go up to the mountain. And I've looked over. And I've seen the promised land. I may not get there with you. But I want you to know tonight, that we, as a people, will get to the promised land! And so I'm happy, tonight; I'm not worried about anything; I'm not fearing any man. Mine eyes have seen the glory of the coming of the Lord!

== Thursday, April 4, 1968 ==
=== Events before the assassination ===
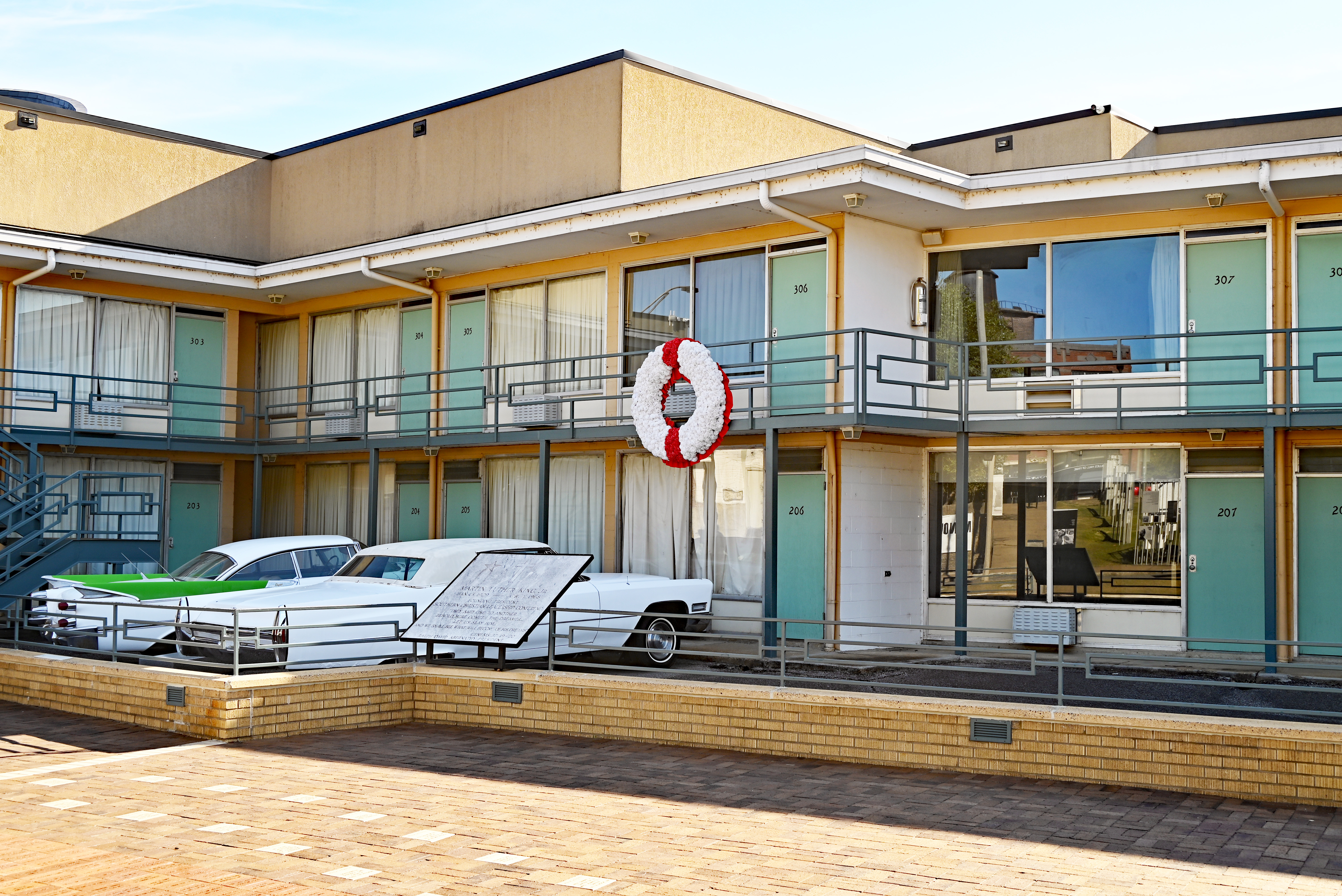
Lorraine Motel, pictured in 2022

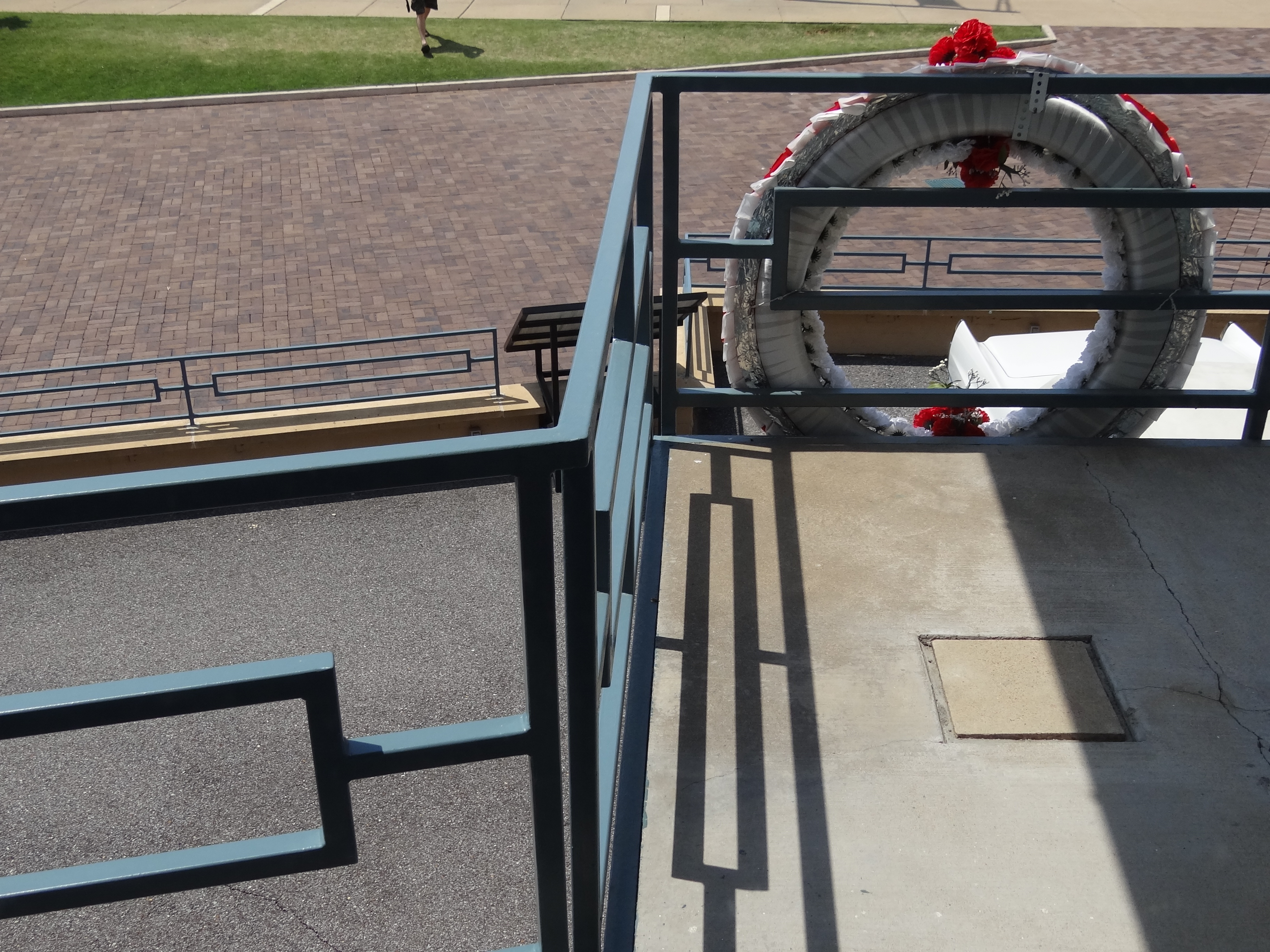
The approximate location of King when he was shot on April 4, 1968, at the Lorraine Motel. The location can be seen marked with a white wreath and a tile on the floor of the balcony.

After the night of April 3 went into April 4, King's brother, A. D. King, checked into room 201 at the Lorraine Motel at roughly 1 a.m. after coming from Florida. After King woke up, Walter Bailey, the owner of the Lorraine Motel at the time, later stated that King seemed particularly happy that day. King, a regular smoker, had gone out to the balcony to smoke a cigarette, a habit he hid from the public.

King then went to a SCLC (Southern Christian Leadership Conference) staff meeting that morning, and the march that was organized to occur on April 5 was moved to Monday, April 8. After the meeting, Abernathy and King had lunch at about 1 p.m., before Abernathy took a nap, and King went to visit his brother to talk with him.

At roughly 4 p.m., Abernathy was woken up from his nap by the telephone in his motel room, where King asked Abernathy to join them. After entering room 201, the three men talked for about an hour, before they returned to their room at about 5 p.m., and King informed Abernathy that they were going to the Reverend Billy Kyles' to have dinner.

They then shaved and dressed for the occasion, and Abernathy told King that he would not be able to attend the poor people's march later that month. In response to this, King told Abernathy that he would consider not going to Washington without him, and attempted to call the Reverend Nutrell Long to see if he could handle the revival instead, but was unable to reach him. By 5:30 p.m., Abernathy had agreed to go to Washington with King, before Kyles came into room 306, urging them to hurry up, as they were leaving soon.

=== Assassination ===
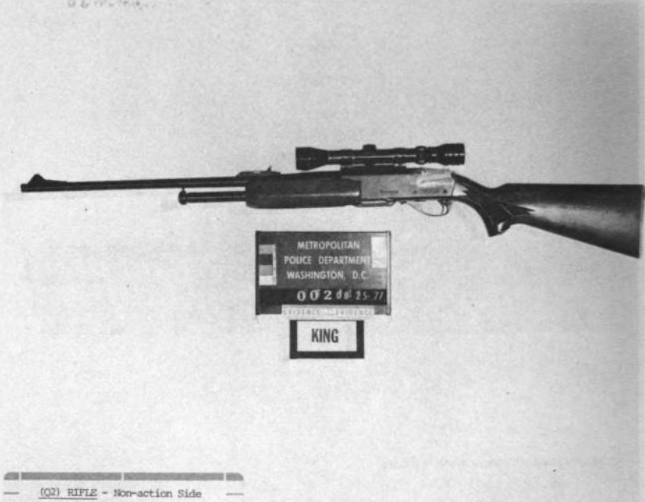
The Remington Gamemaster Model 760 Ray allegedly used to assassinate King, found within 30 minutes of the shooting.

At about 5:55 p.m., King and Abernathy exited room 306, ready for dinner. King then teased his friend Jesse Jackson about being improperly dressed, and paused on the balcony of room 306 to chat with those in the courtyard below, including his driver, Solomon Jones. Jones then advised King to put on a topcoat, as it was cool outside.

King's last words were to musician Ben Branch, who was scheduled to perform that night at a planned event. King said, "Ben, make sure you play 'Take My Hand, Precious Lord' in the meeting tonight. Play it real pretty." In response to this, Branch replied, "Okay, Doc, I will."

According to the Kyles, who was standing several feet away, King was leaning over the balcony railing in front of room 306 when a single shot rang out. At 6:01 p.m., King was struck in the right cheek by a single .30-06 bullet fired from a Remington Model 760 rifle. The bullet broke his jaw before lodging in his right shoulder. The sheer force of the bullet ripped King's necktie off, before he fell backward diagonally onto the balcony.

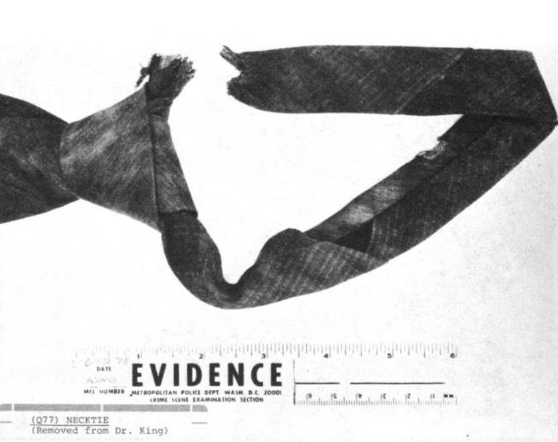
King's necktie after he was assassinated. The right side of the knot was "completely severed" from the bullet.

Andrew Young was one of the first to tend to King, and while he initially believed he was dead, he found King still had a pulse. Shortly afterwards, King's head was placed on a pillow, his neck wound was covered with a towel, and a blanket was draped over his torso. He soon lost consciousness. Clara Ester, a 20-year-old college student who was having dinner at the Lorraine Motel, rushed to help King following the shooting. Ester attempted to loosen King's belt and asked for towels to stop his bleeding.

Additionally, photographer Joseph Louw, who was waiting to cover the next part of King's campaign, was staying at room 309 on the day of the assassination. At about 6 p.m., Louw was watching the television in his room, when he heard what initially sounded like a loud noise. Louw then ran out, and saw that King had been shot. He was the only photographer in the area, and soon thereafter went back into his room to retrieve his cameras, taking several pictures of the scene.

=== Immediate aftermath ===
External videos
- Martin Luther King Jr. death announcement by Walter Cronkite, CBS News Special Report, April 4, 1968, C-SPAN

About two minutes after the shooting occurred, it was radioed to police, who were stationed across the street. At 6:09 p.m., King was lifted onto a stretcher and placed into an ambulance, being escorted by several police officers on motorcycles. At about 6:15 p.m., King arrived in Room 1 of St. Joseph's Hospital, still unconscious, but alive.

After arriving at St. Joseph's, Ted Gaylon was the first to examine King's condition and soon determined that King was still alive. However, Gaylon found that King only had a weak pulse and his breathing pattern was irregular. Despite the large wounds on his face and neck, he was not bleeding excessively, likely because of hypovolemic shock. Surgeons John Reisser and Rufus Brown soon joined the attempt to save King's life, and managed his airway by 6:18 p.m.

By 6:22 p.m., Jerome Barrasso joined to help with a tracheostomy, before taking over the resuscitation attempt at 6:30 p.m. alongside neurosurgeon Fredrick Gioia. Fifteen minutes later, King's blood pressure became undetectable, and the electrocardiogram showed an agonal rhythm. After consulting Joe Wilhite and Julian Fleming, it was determined that King showed "no signs of life." Several more attempts to save King's life were made, but his electrocardiogram flatlined and his pupils became fixed. Barrasso pronounced King dead at 7:05 p.m.

== Responses ==
=== Within the movement ===
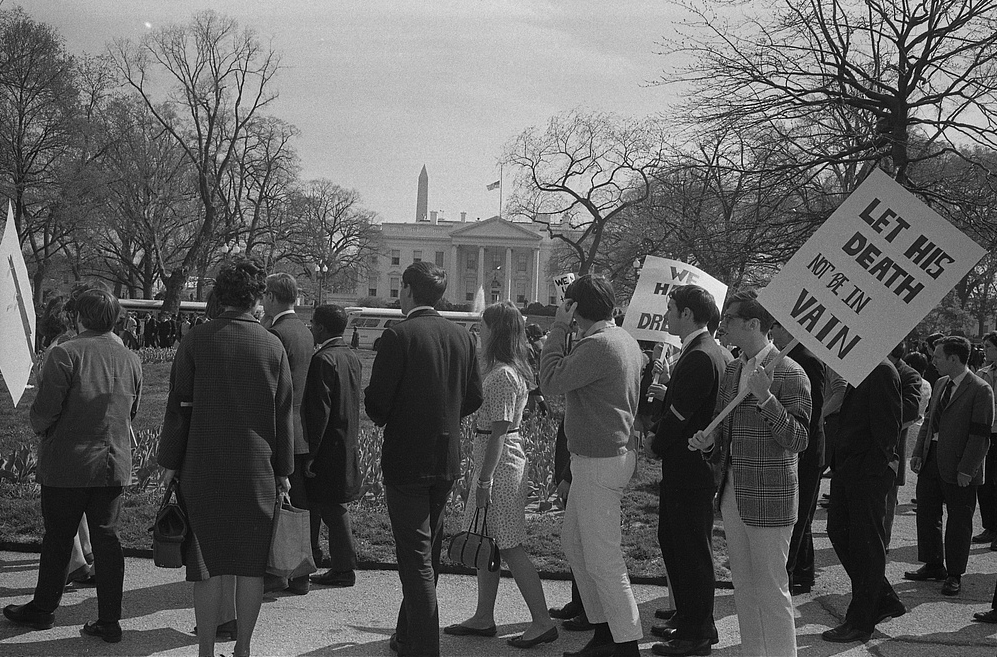
Demonstrator with sign saying "Let his death not be in vain", in front of the White House, after the assassination

For some, King's assassination meant the end of the strategy of nonviolence. Others in the movement reaffirmed the need to carry on King's and the movement's work. Leaders within the SCLC confirmed that they would carry on the Poor People's Campaign that year despite the loss of King. Some black leaders argued the need to continue King's and the movement's tradition of nonviolence.

=== Robert F. Kennedy speech ===
During the day of the assassination while on the campaign trail for the Democratic presidential nomination in Indiana, Senator Robert F. Kennedy learned of the shooting before boarding a plane to Indianapolis. Kennedy was scheduled to make a speech there in a predominantly black neighborhood. Kennedy did not learn that King had died until he landed in Indianapolis.

Kennedy's press secretary, Frank Mankiewicz, suggested that he ask the audience to pray for the King family and to follow King's practice of nonviolence. Mankiewicz and speechwriter Adam Walinsky drafted notes for Kennedy's use, but he refused them, using some that he had likely written during the ride to the site of the speech. Standing on a flatbed truck, he spoke for four minutes and 57 seconds.

Kennedy was the first to tell the audience that King had died. Some of the attendees screamed and wailed in grief. Several of Kennedy's aides were worried that the delivery of this information would result in a riot. When the audience quieted, Kennedy acknowledged that many would be filled with anger. He said: "For those of you who are black and are tempted to be filled with hatred and mistrust of the injustice of such an act, against all white people, I would only say that I can also feel in my own heart the same kind of feeling. I had a member of my family killed, but he was killed by a white man."

Kennedy's speech was credited with assisting in the prevention of post-assassination rioting in Indianapolis on a night when such events broke out in major cities across the country. It was ranked number 17 on a list of the top 100 American speeches of the 20th century, compiled by researchers from the University of Wisconsin–Madison and Texas A&M University, based on a nationwide survey of 137 scholars.

Kennedy canceled all of his scheduled campaign appearances and withdrew to his hotel room. Several phone conversations with black community leaders convinced him to speak out against the violent backlash beginning to emerge across the country. The next day, Kennedy gave a prepared response, "On the Mindless Menace of Violence", in Cleveland, Ohio. Although still considered significant, it is given much less historical attention than his Indianapolis speech.

=== President Lyndon B. Johnson ===
President Lyndon B. Johnson was in the Oval Office that evening, planning a meeting in Hawaii with Vietnam War military commanders. After press secretary George Christian informed him at 8:20 p.m. of the assassination, he canceled the trip to focus on the nation. He assigned Attorney General Ramsey Clark to investigate the assassination in Memphis. He made a personal call to King's wife, Coretta Scott King, and declared April 7 a national day of mourning on which the U.S. flag would be flown at half-staff.

=== Riots ===
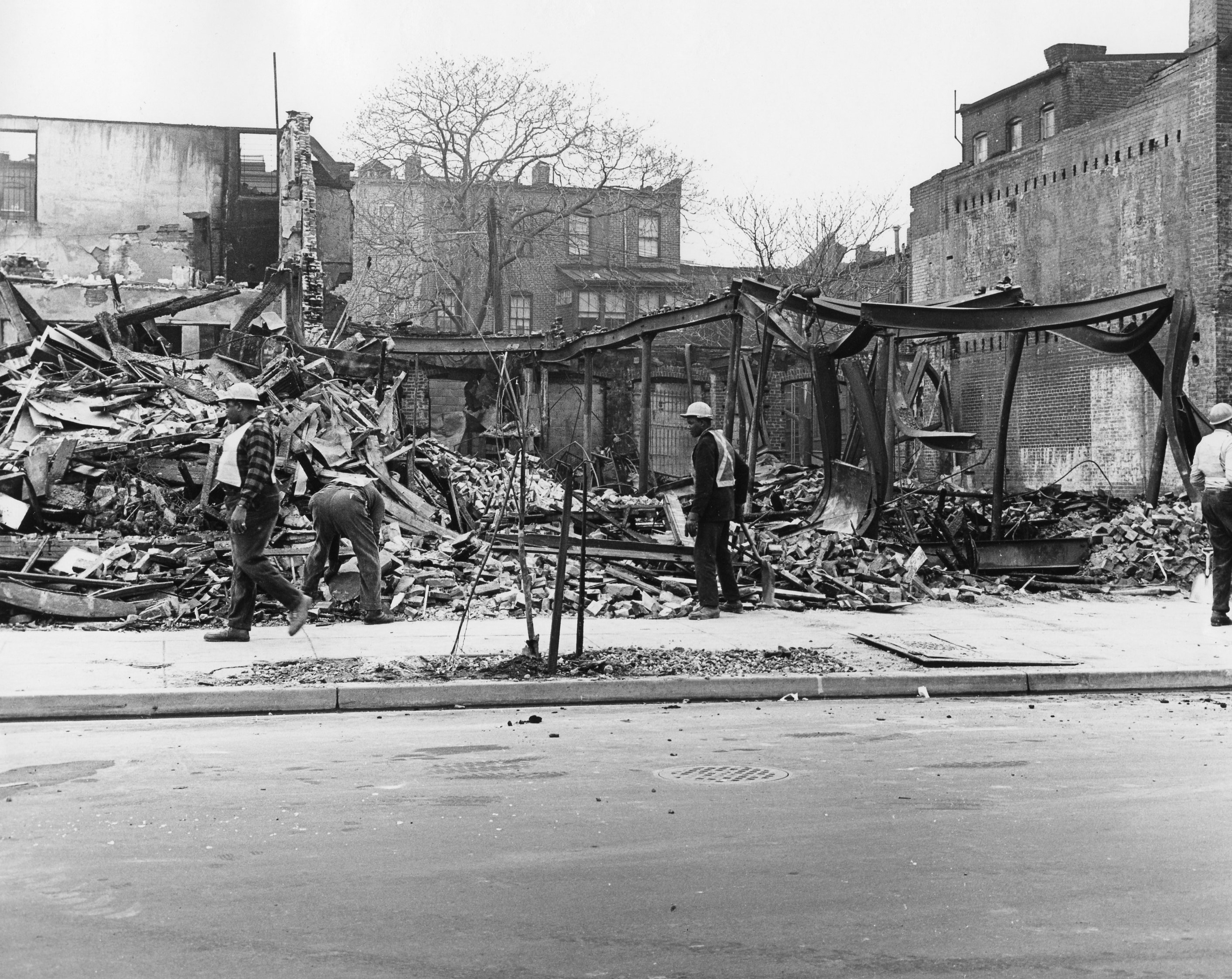
Destruction after the 1968 Washington, D.C., riots

Colleagues of King in the civil rights movement called for a nonviolent response to the assassination to honor his most deeply held beliefs. James Farmer Jr. said:

Dr. King would be greatly distressed to find that his blood had triggered off bloodshed and disorder. I think instead the nation should be quiet; black and white, and we should be in a prayerful mood, which would be in keeping with his life. We should make that kind of dedication and commitment to the goals which his life served to solving the domestic problems. That's the memorial, that's the kind of memorial we should build for him. It's just not appropriate for there to be violent retaliations, and that kind of demonstration in the wake of the murder of this pacifist and man of peace.

However, the more militant Stokely Carmichael called for forceful action, saying:

White America killed Dr. King last night. She made it a whole lot easier for a whole lot of black people today. There no longer needs to be intellectual discussions, black people know that they have to get guns. White America will live to cry that she killed Dr. King last night. It would have been better if she had killed Rap Brown and/or Stokely Carmichael, but when she killed Dr. King, she lost.

Despite the urging for calm by many leaders, a nationwide wave of riots erupted in more than 100 cities. After the assassination, the city of Memphis quickly settled the strike on favorable terms to the sanitation workers.

=== Reactions ===
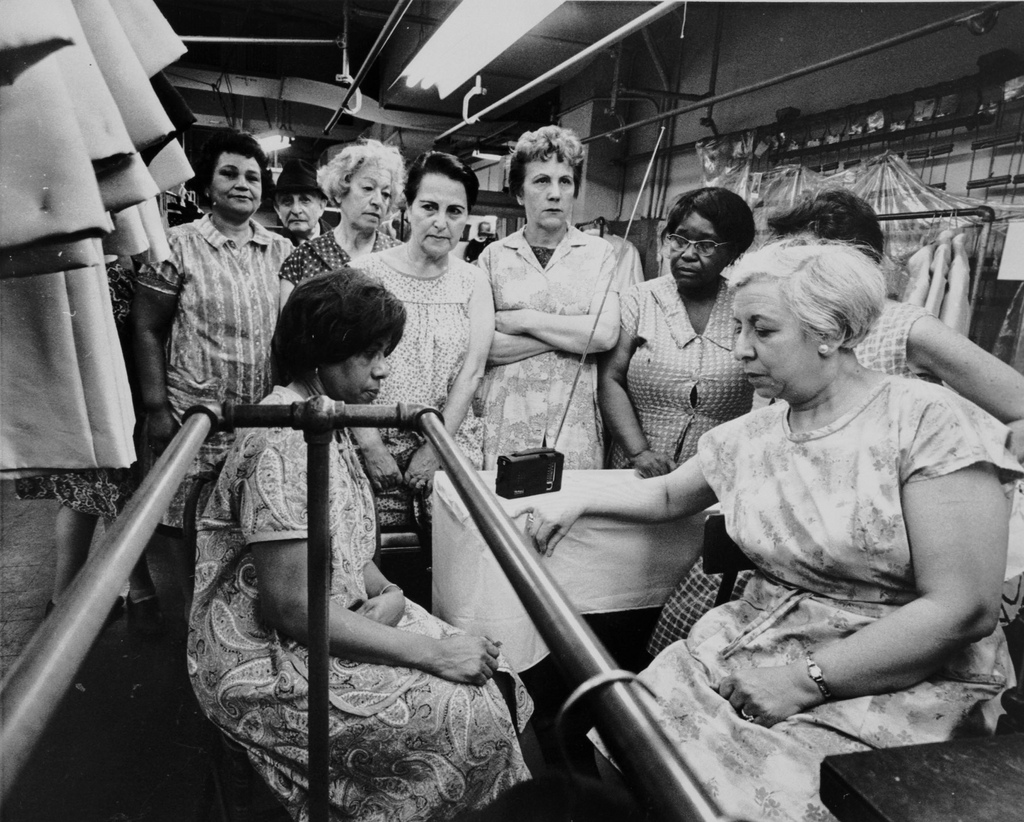
Garment workers listen to King's funeral service on a portable radio, April 9, 1968

On April 8, King's widow Coretta Scott King and her four young children led a crowd estimated at 40,000 in a silent march through the streets of Memphis to honor King and support the cause of the city's black sanitation workers.

The next day, funeral rites were held in King's hometown of Atlanta, Georgia. The service at Ebenezer Baptist Church was nationally televised, as were other events. A funeral procession transported King's body for 3 1/2 miles (5.6 km) through the streets of Atlanta, followed by more than 100,000 mourners, from the church to his alma mater, Morehouse College. A second service was held there before the burial.

In the wake of King's assassination, journalists reported some callous or hostile reactions from parts of white America, particularly in the South. David Halberstam, who reported on King's funeral, recounted a comment heard at an affluent white dinner party:

One of the wives—station wagon, three children, forty-five-thousand-dollar house—leaned over and said, "I wish you had spit in his face for me." It was a stunning moment; I wondered for a long time afterwards what King could possibly have done to her, in what conceivable way he could have threatened her, why this passionate hate.

Reporters recounted that many white people were also grief-stricken at the leader's death. In some cases, the shock of events altered opinions. A survey later sent to a group of college trustees revealed that their opinions of King had risen after his assassination. The New York Times praised King in an editorial, calling his murder a "national disaster" and his cause "just".

Public figures generally praised King in the days following his death. Others expressed political ideology. Governor George Wallace of Alabama, known as a segregationist, described the assassination as a "senseless, regrettable act", but Governor Lester Maddox of Georgia called King "an enemy of our country" and threatened to "personally raise" the state capitol flag back from half-staff. California Governor Ronald Reagan described the assassination as "a great tragedy that began when we began compromising with law and order and people started choosing which laws they'd break". South Carolina senator Strom Thurmond wrote to his constituents: "We are now witnessing the whirlwind sowed years ago when some preachers and teachers began telling people that each man could be his own judge in his own case."

== FBI investigation ==
The Federal Bureau of Investigation was assigned the lead to investigate King's death. J. Edgar Hoover, who had previously made efforts to undermine King's reputation, told President Johnson that his agency would attempt to find the culprit(s). Many documents related to the investigation remain classified and are slated to remain secret until 2027. In 2010, as in earlier years, some argued for passage of a proposed Records Collection Act, similar to a 1992 law concerning the Kennedy assassination, to require the immediate release of the records. The measure did not pass.

=== Initial investigation ===
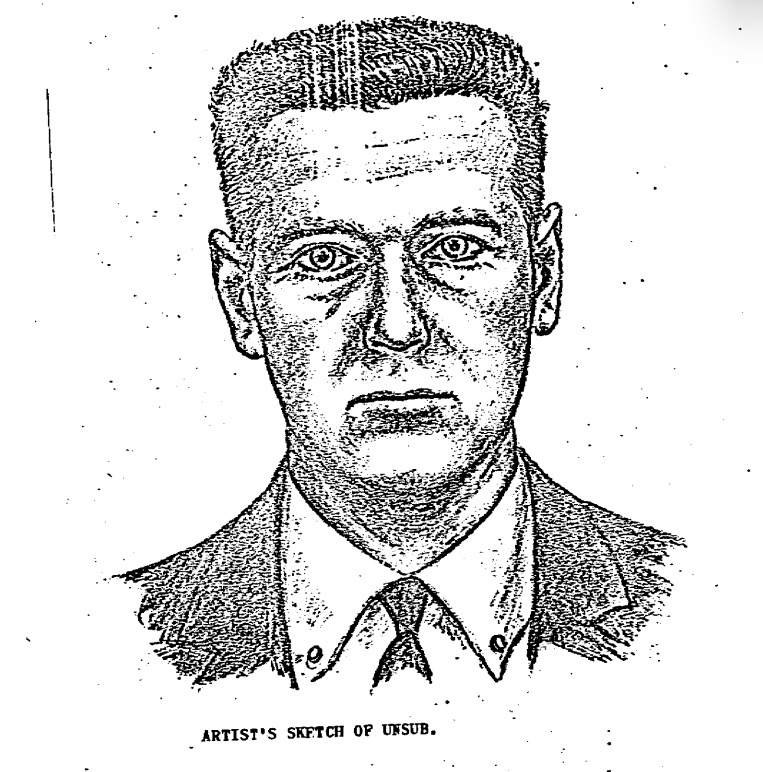
An FBI composite sketch of James Earl Ray. First published by the office of Birmingham, Alabama, on April 17, 1968.

By April 17, 1968, a description, as well as several composite sketches of the perpetrator, had been made. This description illustrated that the assassin of King was a 36- to 38-year-old Caucasian male, who was between 5'8" and 5'10" in height, 165 to 175 pounds in weight, and had medium, combed brown hair and blue eyes.

On April 19, the FBI managed to match the fingerprints found on the rifle to a 40-year-old man named James Earl Ray, and the investigation began to focus on him. On April 29, Memphis city engineer Arthur Holbrook determined the exact distance and angle Ray fired the bullet from after measurements of the Lorraine Motel were made on April 23.

By the end of April 1968, the FBI had found several pieces of physical evidence in room 5B. This evidence includes (but is not limited to): several brown hair follicles, dark brown to black beard fragments (both of which were determined to be of "Caucasian origin"), green and brown cotton fibers, smears of brown soil, a black rifle box, a cardboard binoculars box, a fingerprint card for Bessie Brewer, and various pieces of clothing.

=== Autopsy report ===
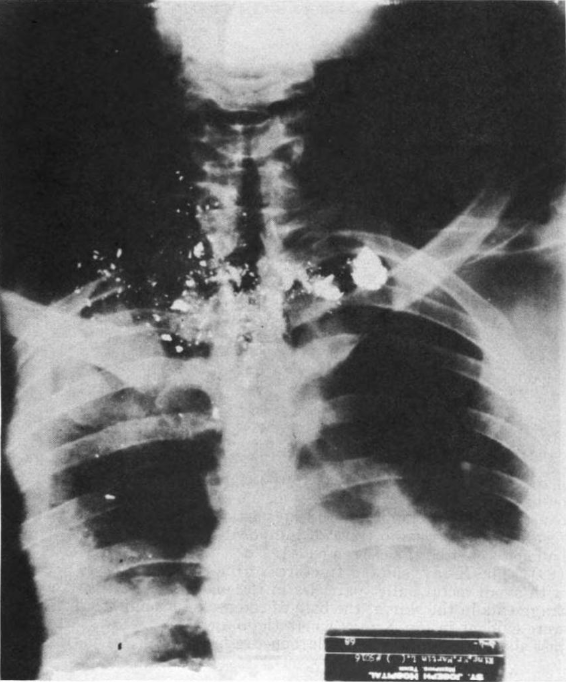
X-ray of King after his death, and before his autopsy

Shortly after King was pronounced dead, his body was moved from St. Joseph's Hospital to John Gaston Hospital, where Dr. Jerry Francisco conducted an autopsy at roughly 10:45 pm, first published in Shelby County, Tennessee, on April 11, 1968. At the time of his death, King, aged 39, was described as measuring at 69.5 inches (176.5 cm) in height and about 140 pounds (63.5 kg) in weight.

The anatomical diagnosis by Dr. Francisco stated that:

Death was the result of a gunshot wound to the chin and neck with a total transection of the lower cervical and upper thoracic spinal cord and other structures in the neck. The direction of the wounding was from front to back, above downward and from right to left. The severing of the spinal cord at this level and to this extent was a wound that was fatal very shortly after its occurrence.

— Dr. Jerry T. Francisco, autopsy report of Martin Luther King Jr., page 1.

It was further determined that King was struck on the right side of his face, about 1.5 inches (3.8 cm) away from "below the angle of the mouth." The bullet entered through the right mandible, before it entered King's right pleural cavity, fractured his jawbone, and exited by the right side of the chin. The bullet then re-entered through the base of King's neck, continuing through the right supraclavicular fossa. The bullet left a 3-inch wound in King's right cheek, and injured his external jugular vein, vertebral artery, and subclavian artery, before lodging itself near the back of the left scapula.

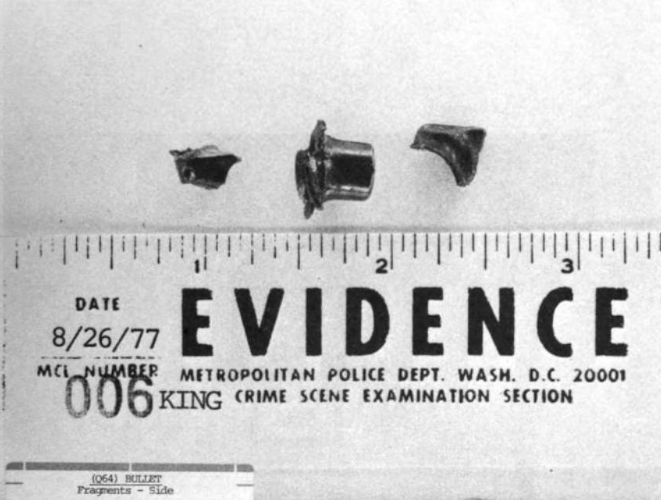
Three bullet fragments removed from King after he was assassinated

There was also an 8-inch scar above King's right breast, and a 6.5-inch scar on his upper chest. However, these scars were attributed to the 1958 assassination attempt, not the bullet fired by Ray. After the bullet was removed from King's body, it was determined that there were no other pertinent findings. The official cause of death was listed as "hemodynamic collapse from hemorrhagic shock." Even if King had survived, it was determined that the injuries inflicted to King's spinal cord would have left him quadriplegic. King also had a blood alcohol content of 0.01% found in samples of his blood and urine.

Three bullet fragments were recovered from King's body, which were found in King's back during the process of the autopsy, and were extracted by Dr. Francisco. Finally, according to Ben Branch, King's autopsy also revealed that his heart was in the condition of a 60-year-old man rather than that of a 39-year-old such as King, which Branch attributed to the stress of King's 13 years in the civil rights movement.

== Funeral ==
A crowd of 300,000 attended King's funeral on April 9. Vice President Hubert Humphrey attended on behalf of Johnson, who was at a meeting on the Vietnam War at Camp David; there were fears that Johnson might be hit with protests and abuse over the war if he attended the funeral. At his widow's request, King's last sermon at Ebenezer Baptist Church was played at the funeral; it was a recording of his "Drum Major" sermon given on February 4, 1968. In that sermon, he asked that, at his funeral, no mention of his awards and honors be made, but that it be said he tried to "feed the hungry", "clothe the naked", "be right on the [Vietnam] war question", and "love and serve humanity".

== Perpetrator ==
=== Alleged activities ===
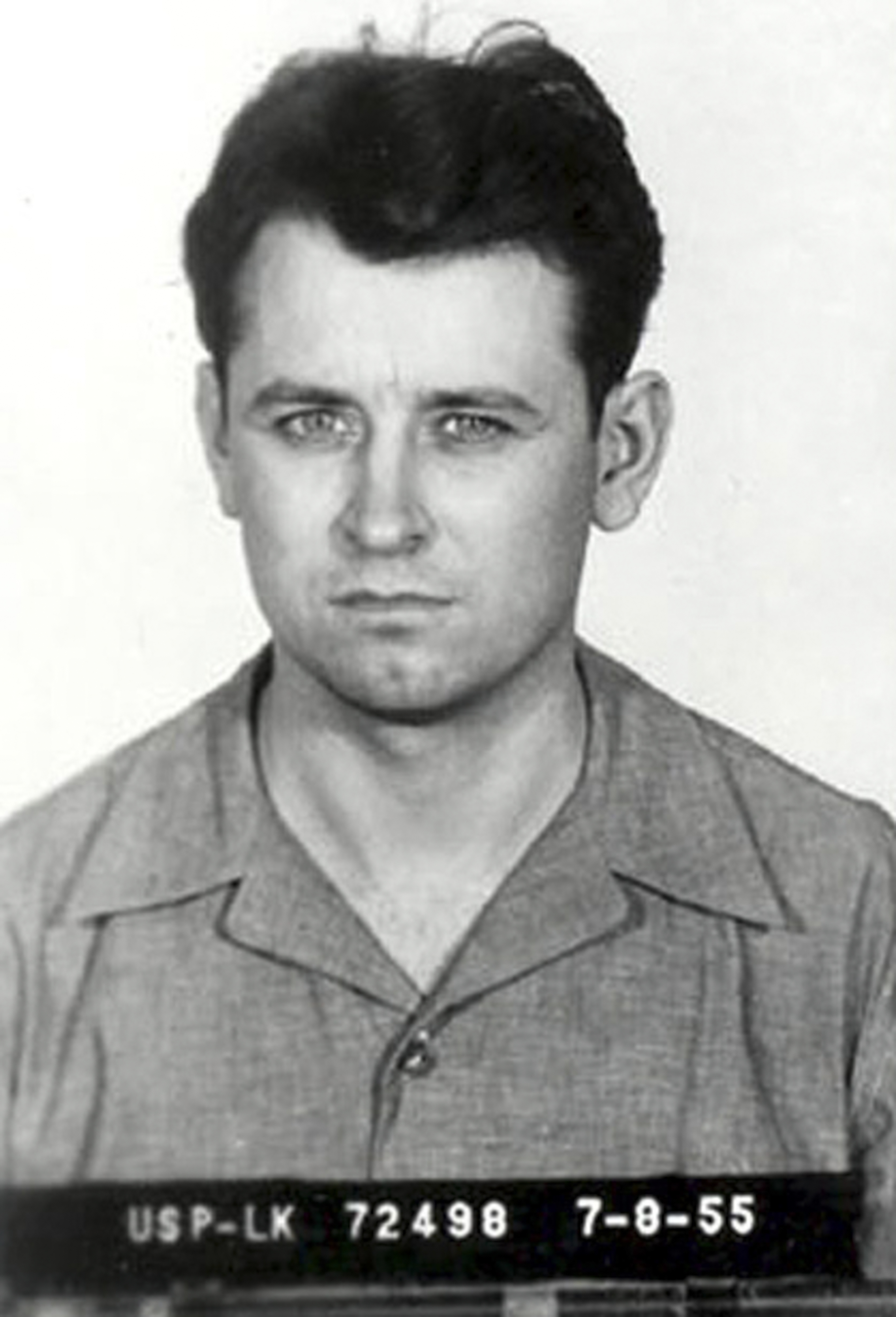
1955 mug shot of Ray

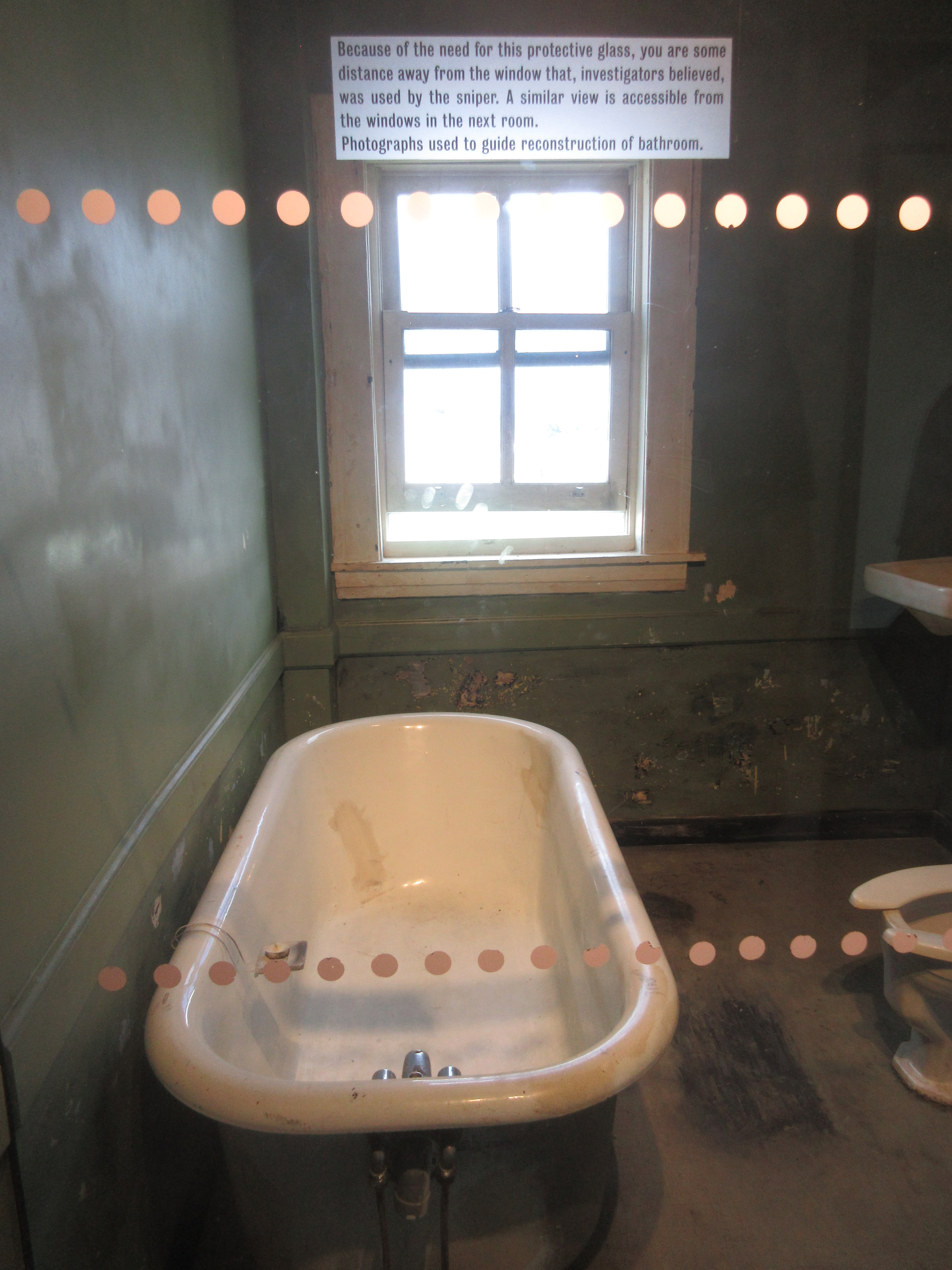
Bathroom of room 5B, from where Ray is believed to have fired.

The FBI investigation found fingerprints on various objects left in the bathroom from which the gunfire had come. Evidence included a Remington Gamemaster rifle from which at least one shot had been fired. The fingerprints were traced to an escaped convict named James Earl Ray. According to the FBI and the House Committee on Assassinations, Ray had escaped from the Missouri State Penitentiary by use of a bakery truck on April 23, 1967, after serving 7 years in jail for robbery.

On March 22 of the following year, Ray drove to Selma, Alabama, and began to stalk Dr. King. On March 29, Ray bought ammunition for a .243 caliber rifle in Bessemer, before buying a Remington Model 760 rifle from a gun dealer in Birmingham, Alabama, using the false name of Harvey Lowmeyer on March 30.

On April 1, the SCLC announced that King would be participating in a march on April 8, and Ray drove 7 hours to Memphis on April 3. Then, using the name of Eric Galt, Ray registered into room 34 at the Rebel Motor Hotel. The following day, Ray left his room at the Rebel Hotel sometime before the 1 p.m. checkout time, before arriving at Bessie Brewer's rooming house at 422 1/2 South Main Street, and renting room 5B under the name of John Willard. Then, at roughly 4 pm, Ray bought a pair of binoculars, before returning to his room by 5 p.m. and firing the shot that killed King from the bathroom window at 6:01.

=== Escape and capture ===
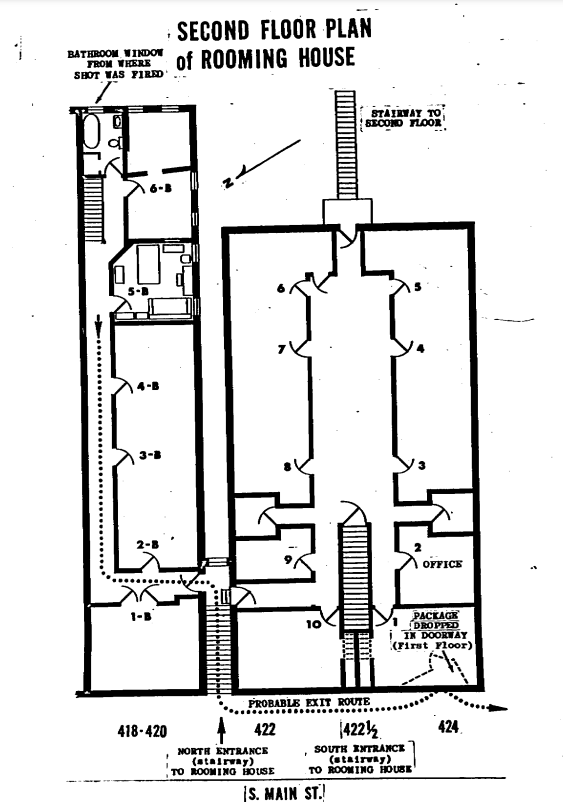
Diagram made by the FBI of the second floor of Bessie Brewer's rooming house, showing the bathroom window Ray fired from, as well as his probable escape route.

Shortly after the shot that killed King was fired, witnesses saw a white man, later believed to be James Earl Ray, fleeing from a rooming-house across the street from the Lorraine Motel. At 6:10 pm, the first description of the shooter was dispatched, before police found a package dumped at room 5B. This package included a rifle and binoculars, both bearing Ray's fingerprints. After its discovery at 6:30 pm, this bundle was handed over to the FBI at 8:15.

After a manhunt that lasted more than two months, Ray was caught at London's Heathrow Airport while attempting to leave for Brussels, Belgium using a falsified Canadian passport under the name of Ramon George Sneyd on June 8, 1968. At check-in, the ticket agent noticed the name on his passport was on a Royal Canadian Mounted Police watchlist.

Ray was then extradited to Memphis on July 19, before confessing to the assassination the next year on March 10, 1969, the day of his 41st birthday. On the advice of his attorney, Percy Foreman, Ray took a guilty plea to avoid a conviction and potential death penalty. Ray was sentenced by Judge W. Preston Battle to a 99-year prison term, but he recanted his confession three days later.

Ray and seven other convicts escaped from Brushy Mountain State Penitentiary in Petros, Tennessee, on June 10, 1977. All eight escapees were recaptured on June 13 and returned to prison. A year was added to Ray's sentence. Another escape attempt was performed by Ray on November 9, 1979, but the plan was foiled when a guard spotted him crawling along the base of the prison wall, covered by a camouflage patterned blanket.

Ray worked for the remainder of his life unsuccessfully attempting to withdraw his guilty plea and secure a full trial. In 1997, King's son, Dexter, met with Ray; he publicly supported Ray's efforts to obtain a retrial. William Francis Pepper remained Ray's attorney until Ray's death. He carried on the effort to gain a trial on behalf of the King family, who did not believe Ray was responsible, claiming that there was a conspiracy by elements of the government against King.

Ray died in prison on April 23, 1998, at the age of 70 from liver failure caused by hepatitis C, after being hospitalized more than 15 times, and falling into a coma on three occasions. It was not conclusively determined how Ray contracted the viral infection, but some sources state that he was stabbed while in prison.

== Alleged government involvement ==
In 1977, Ray fired Foreman and claimed that a man whom he had met in Montreal by the alias of "Raoul" was involved, as was Ray's brother Johnny, but that Ray himself was not. He said through his new attorney Jack Kershaw that, although he did not "personally shoot King", he may have been "partially responsible without knowing it." In May 1977, Kershaw presented evidence to the House Select Committee on Assassinations that he believed exonerated his client, but tests did not prove conclusive. Kershaw also claimed that Ray was somewhere else when the shots were fired, but he could not find a witness to corroborate the claim.

As early as August 1979, Jesse Jackson had been convinced that Ray was innocent, and wrote a foreword for Ray's book Who Killed Martin Luther King?: The True Story by the Alleged Assassin in 1991. The King family, along with other friends of King, believed his assassination could have been part of a larger government conspiracy, as the White House approved efforts to criticize King's reputation in an attempt to connect him with the Communist Party.

=== Loyd Jowers ===
In December 1993, Loyd Jowers, a white man from Memphis with business interests in the vicinity of the assassination site, appeared on ABC's Prime Time Live. He had gained attention by claiming that he had conspired with the mafia and the federal government to kill King. According to Jowers, Ray was a scapegoat and was not directly involved in the shooting. Jowers claimed that he had hired someone to kill King as a favor for a friend in the mafia, Frank Liberto, a produce merchant who died before 1993.

According to the Department of Justice, Jowers had inconsistently identified different people as King's assassin since 1993. He had alternatively claimed the shooter was: (1) an African-American man who was on South Main Street on the night of the assassination (the "Man on South Main Street"); (2) "Raoul"; (3) a white "Lieutenant" with the Memphis Police Department; and (4) a person whom he did not recognize. The Department of Justice does not consider Jowers' accusations credible and refers to two of the accused individuals by pseudonym. (Note: Because [the Department of Justice] does not credit Jowers' inconsistent allegations, we refer to the two assassins he has named as the "Man on South Main Street" and the "Lieutenant", respectively.) It has stated that the evidence allegedly supporting the existence of "Raoul" is dubious.

==== Coretta Scott King v. Loyd Jowers ====
In 1997, King's son Dexter met with Ray and asked him, "I just want to ask you, for the record, um, did you kill my father?" Ray replied, "No. No I didn't," and King told Ray that he, along with the King family, believed him. The King family urged that Ray be granted a new trial. In 1999, the family filed a civil case against Jowers and unnamed co-conspirators for the wrongful death of King. The case, Coretta Scott King, et al. vs. Loyd Jowers et al., Case No. 97242, was tried in the circuit court of Shelby County, Tennessee from November 15 to December 8, 1999.

Attorney William Francis Pepper, representing the King family, presented evidence from 70 witnesses and 4,000 pages of transcripts. Pepper alleges in his book An Act of State (2003) that the evidence implicated the FBI, the CIA, the U.S. Army, the Memphis Police Department, and organized crime in the murder. The suit alleged government involvement; however, no government officials or agencies were named or made party to the suit, so there was no defense or evidence presented or refuted by the government. The jury of six black people and six white people decided that King had been the victim of a conspiracy involving the Memphis police and federal agencies, finding Jowers and unknown co-defendants civilly liable and awarding the family $100.

Local assistant district attorney John Campbell, who was not involved in the case, said that the case was flawed and "overlooked so much contradictory evidence that never was presented". This civil verdict against Jowers has been claimed by some to have established Ray's criminal innocence, which the King family has always maintained, but it has no bearing on his guilty plea. In the United States, civil and criminal trials are always adjudicated independently. The family said that it had requested only $100 in damages to demonstrate that it was not seeking financial gain. Dexter King called the verdict "a vindication for us". At a press conference following the trial, he and his mother Coretta Scott King told reporters that they believed the mafia and state, local, and federal government agencies had conspired to plan the assassination and frame Ray as the shooter. When asked whom the family believed was the true assassin, Dexter King said that Jowers had identified Lt. Earl Clark of the Memphis Police Department as the shooter.

==== Counter evidence ====
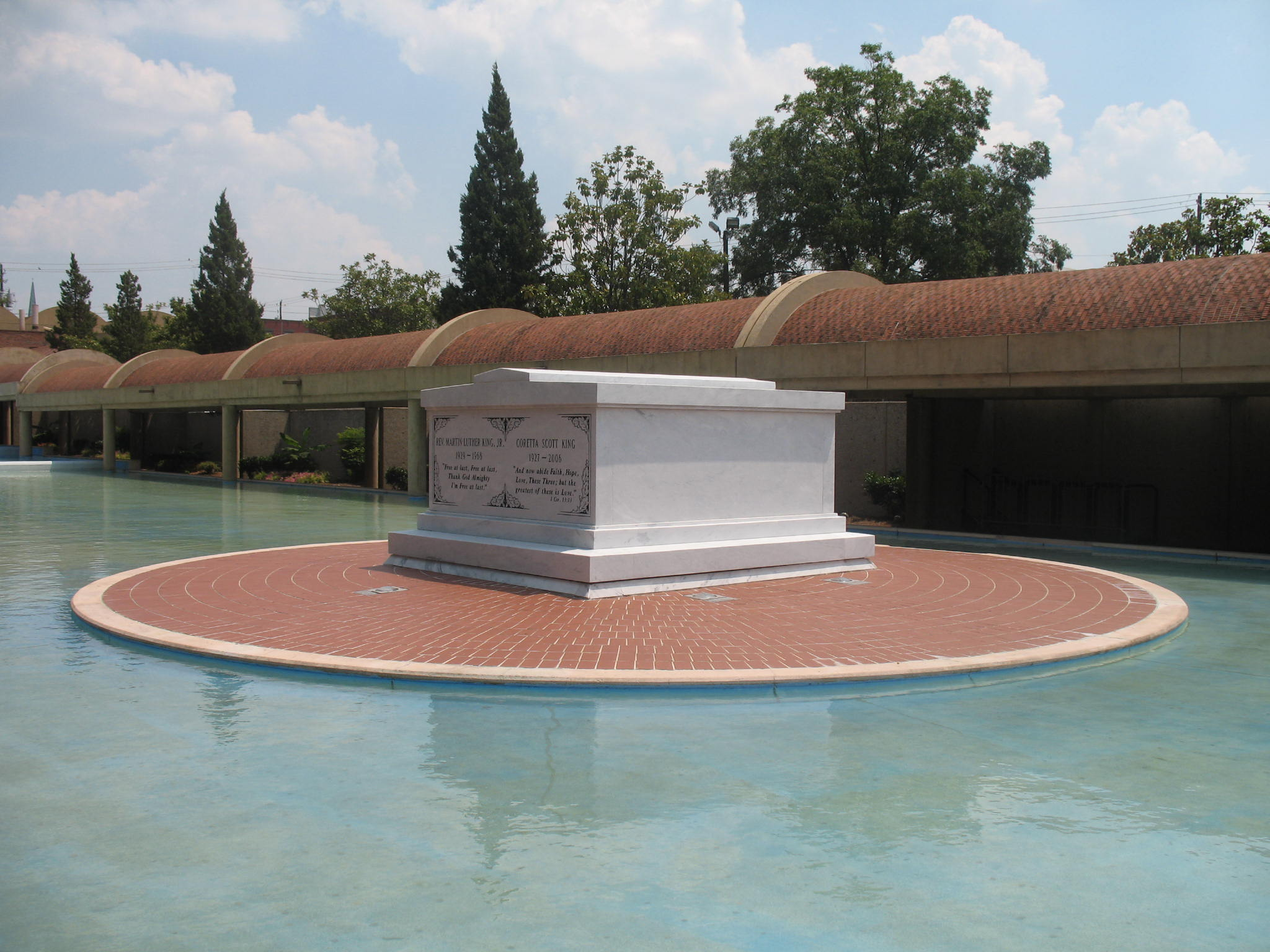
Tomb of Martin Luther King and Coretta Scott King, located on the grounds of the King Center in Atlanta

In 2000, the Department of Justice completed its investigation into Jowers' claims, citing no evidence to support the conspiracy allegations. The investigation report recommended no further investigation unless new reliable facts were presented. A sister of Jowers said that he had fabricated the story to earn $300,000 by selling it, and that she had corroborated the story to get money to pay her income taxes. King biographer David Garrow disagrees with Pepper's claims that the government killed King. He is supported by author Gerald Posner, who wrote Killing the Dream: James Earl Ray and the Assassination of Martin Luther King, Jr. (1998), concluding that Ray killed King, acting alone, likely for the hope of collecting a racist bounty for the murder.

Critics of the official verdict on King's death bristled at Killing the Dream, criticizing Posner for, in part, basing it on "a psychological evaluation of James Earl Ray, which he [Posner] is not qualified to give, and he dismisses evidence of conspiracy in King's murder as cynical attempts to exploit the tragedy". Pepper repeatedly dismissed Posner's book as inaccurate and misleading, and Dexter King also criticized it. In response to the 1999 verdict in King vs. Jowers, Posner told The New York Times: "It distresses me greatly that the legal system was used in such a callous and farcical manner in Memphis. If the King family wanted a rubber stamp of their own view of the facts, they got it."

=== Other theories ===
In 1998, CBS reported that two separate ballistic tests conducted on the Remington Gamemaster allegedly used by Ray in the assassination were inconclusive. Some witnesses with King at the moment of the shooting said that the shot had been fired from a different location and not from Ray's window; they believed that the source was a spot behind thick shrubbery near the rooming house.

King's friend and SCLC organizer Reverend James Lawson has suggested that the impending occupation of Washington, D.C. by the Poor People's Campaign was a primary motive for the assassination. Lawson also noted during the civil trial that King alienated President Johnson and other powerful government actors when he repudiated the Vietnam War on April 4, 1967—exactly one year before the assassination.

Some evidence has suggested that King had been targeted by COINTELPRO and had also been under surveillance by military intelligence agencies during the period leading up to his assassination under the code name Operation Lantern Spike.

Minister Ronald Denton Wilson claimed that his father, Henry Clay Wilson, assassinated King. He stated: "It wasn't a racist thing; he thought Martin Luther King was connected with communism, and he wanted to get him out of the way." However, reportedly Wilson had previously admitted his father was a member of the Ku Klux Klan.

In 2004, Jesse Jackson, who was with King when he was assassinated, noted:

The fact is there were saboteurs to disrupt the march. [And] within our own organization, we found a very key person who was on the government payroll. So infiltration within, saboteurs from without and the press attacks. I will never believe that James Earl Ray had the motive, the money and the mobility to have done it himself. Our government was very involved in setting the stage for and I think the escape route for James Earl Ray.

According to biographer Taylor Branch, King's friend and colleague James Bevel put it more bluntly: "There is no way a ten-cent white boy could develop a plan to kill a million-dollar black man."

=== Executive order to release government records ===
On January 23, 2025, president Donald Trump signed an executive order to declassify the documents regarding King's assassination, as well as those regarding the assassinations of John F. Kennedy and Robert F. Kennedy.

== Legacy ==
Following the deaths of Jesse Jackson in February 2026 and civil rights activist Clara Ester in July 2026, Andrew Young is believed to be the last surviving eyewitness to King's assassination.

== See also ==
- List of photographs considered the most important
- Assassination of Malcolm X
- Assassination of Fred Hampton
- Post–civil rights era in African-American history
