= Clara Ester =

American United Methodist minister and civil rights activist (1948–2026)

- Ester graduating Memphis State College in 1969
- Born: February 17, 1948; Memphis, Tennessee, U.S.
- Died: July 9, 2026 (aged 78); Mobile, Alabama, U.S.
- Occupations: United Methodist deaconess Civil rights activist
- Children: Reginald Ester

Clara Jean Ester (February 17, 1948 – July 9, 2026) was an American United Methodist Church deaconess, civil rights activist, and former national vice president of United Methodist Women, which is now known as the United Women in Faith.

On April 4, 1968, Ester, then a 20-year old college student, witnessed the assassination of Martin Luther King Jr. and rushed to help King as he was dying in the aftermath of the shooting. Following the deaths of Jesse Jackson in February 2026 and Ester in July 2026, it is believed that Andrew Young is the last known surviving eyewitness to Martin Luther King Jr.'s assassination.

== Biography ==
=== Early life ===
Clara Jean Ester was born on February 17, 1948, in Memphis, Tennessee, to Anderson Ester Sr. and Willie Love Ester. She graduated from Booker T. Washington High School in 1965.

She attended Centenary United Methodist Church in Memphis with her family. The church's pastor, Rev. James Lawson, was a civil rights activist who preached nonviolence within the Civil Rights Movement, Lawson spoke of civil rights issues from his pulpit and was involved with the 1968 Memphis sanitation strike, which influenced Ester's activism. Ester joined Lawson and the sanitation workers during their meetings and strikes.

=== Assassination of Martin Luther King Jr. ===
On April 4, 1968, Ester, then a 20-year old college student, witnessed the assassination of Martin Luther King Jr. Ester went to the Lorraine Motel with a friend for dinner when she saw Rev. Martin Luther King Jr. standing on a hotel balcony talking with a group of people below him. King had traveled to Memphis to support the workers during the ongoing sanitation strike.

While watching King from the parking lot, Ester heard the gunshot, recalling that it "sounded like a truck backfiring", but "I never took my eyes off him [King].” In a 2018 interview with Lester Holt of NBC News, Ester recounted King's murder, telling Holt, "I heard somebody say, 'Get down, get down,' but I saw him being lifted up and thrown back...Lester, I can’t tell you how my little feet got up to that balcony,” Ester said. “But I remember stepping over his body to where the wound was. I checked for a pulse, which was just literally no beat at all."

Ester ran to help King after the shooting. She asked for hotel towels to help stop King's bleeding and attempted to loosen his belt. Speaking to the Associated Press in a 2018 interview marking the 50th anniversary of King's assassination, Ester recalled, "He was speaking calmly and pleasantly to a crowd. And so he was happy at that moment. But to lay there with his eyes open, looking toward heaven. He had seen the promised land, and he may not get there with us, but he promised that we as a people will see the promised land."

=== Career and later life ===
In the summer of 1968, following King's assassination, Ester left Memphis for work. She permanently left Memphis once she finished college at Memphis State University, telling the Associated Press, "It's just too much to ... it hurt me that it happened, but it hurt me that it happened in my hometown, that that’s the legacy for this city."

Ester moved to Mobile, Alabama, in 1970 and became an active member of the city's Toulminville-Warren Street United Methodist Church. She began working as a neighborhood organizer for the Dumas Wesley Community Center, which provided resources to children, the homeless, and the elderly. She was later promoted to executive director of the Dumas Wesley Community Center, a position she held until her retirement in 2006.

In 1986, Ester became a deaconess of the United Methodist Church. She served as the vice president of United Methodist Women, which is now known as the United Women in Faith.

Ester died from a stroke in Mobile, on July 9, 2026, at the age of 78. Following her death, Andrew Young became the last known living witness to the 1968 assassination of Martin Luther King Jr.
