= James Earl Ray =

Assassin of Martin Luther King Jr. (1928–1998)

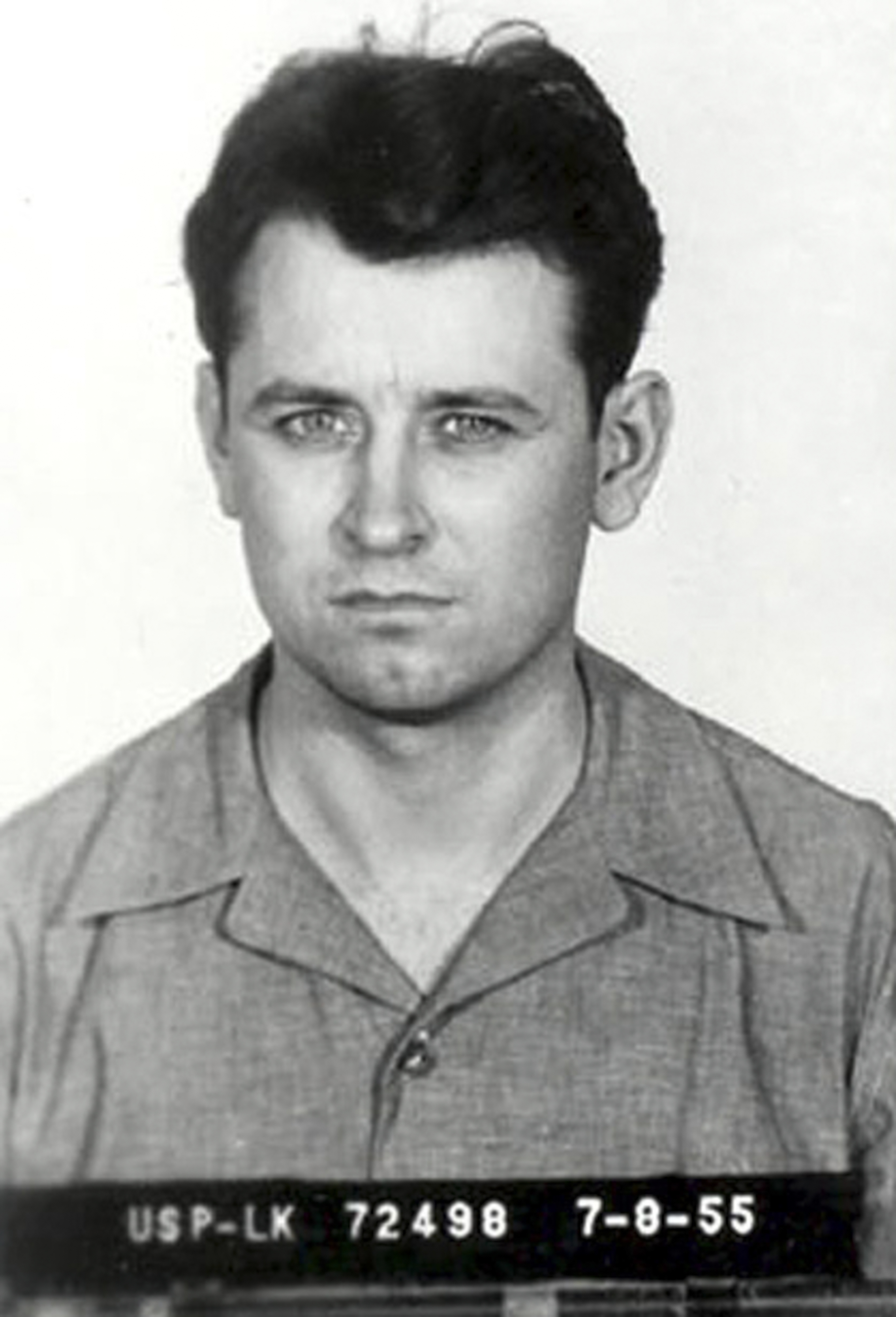
- Mug shot of Ray taken on July 8, 1955
- Born: March 10, 1928; Alton, Illinois, U.S.
- Died: April 23, 1998 (aged 70); Madison, Tennessee, U.S.
- Known for: Being convicted for the assassination of Martin Luther King Jr.
- Convictions: 11 counts (Note: First degree murder Armed robbery (4x) Mail fraud Burglary (2x) Passport fraud Escape (2x))
- Penalty: 100 years imprisonment (Note: 99 years for murder, one year consecutive for escape)
- Escaped: April 23, 1967–June 8, 1968; June 10–13, 1977

Details
- Victims: Martin Luther King Jr., 39
- Date: April 4, 1968
- Ray's voice Ray speaks on his initial escape from the Missouri State Penitentiary. Recorded November 3, 1977

James Earl Ray (March 10, 1928 – April 23, 1998) was an American criminal who was convicted of the assassination of Martin Luther King Jr. at the Lorraine Motel in Memphis, Tennessee, on April 4, 1968.

After the assassination, Ray, who had planned on living in exile in Rhodesia (now Zimbabwe), fled to London and was captured there. Ray was convicted in 1969 after entering a guilty plea—thus forgoing a jury trial and the possibility of a death sentence—and was sentenced to 99 years of imprisonment. He later made many attempts to withdraw his guilty plea and to be tried by a jury, but was unsuccessful.

While Ray was not formally registered with a political party, his political views were aligned with the segregationist platform. He was a staunch supporter of the segregationist Alabama governor George Wallace and his 1968 presidential campaign with the American Independent Party.

Ray died on April 23, 1998, at age 70, at the Nashville Memorial Hospital in Madison, Tennessee, from complications related to kidney disease and liver failure caused by hepatitis C, having served 29 years in prison.

In 1994, Loyd Jowers, a restaurant owner, publicly began claiming that he had been part of a conspiracy to assassinate King and that Ray was a scapegoat. In a Memphis civil trial five years later, a jury unanimously concluded that Jowers was liable for the assassination, that King was the victim of a conspiracy, and that various U.S. governmental agencies had conspired to murder King and frame Ray for the assassination.

The King family has consistently said that they believe Ray was innocent, although this conclusion was disputed by the U.S. Department of Justice in 2000. The King family has stated that they believe the true murderer was a Memphis Police Department officer, Lieutenant Earl Clark.

== Early life ==
Ray was born on March 10, 1928, in Alton, Illinois, to George Ellis Ray and Lucille Ray (née Maher). He had Irish, Scottish and Welsh ancestry.

In February 1935, Ray's father, known by the nickname Great Dane, passed a bad check in Alton, Illinois, and then moved to Ewing, Missouri, where the family changed their name to Raynes to avoid law enforcement.

James Earl Ray was the oldest of nine children, including John Larry Ray, Franklin Ray, Jerry William Ray, Melba Ray, Carol Ray Pepper, Suzan Ray, and Marjorie Ray. Marjorie died in a fire as a young child in 1933. Ray left school at age 12 and later joined the U.S. Army at the close of World War II, serving in Germany. Ray struggled to adapt to military life and was discharged for ineptitude and lack of adaptability in 1948.

== Initial convictions and first escape from prison ==
Before being convicted for the murder of King, Ray had committed a variety of crimes and was a small time crook. His first conviction for criminal activity, a burglary in California, came in 1949. Three years later, Ray served two years for the armed robbery of a taxi driver in Illinois. In 1955, he was convicted of mail fraud after stealing money orders in Hannibal, Missouri. For this, Ray was imprisoned for four years in the federal United States Penitentiary Leavenworth.

In 1959, Ray was caught stealing $120 (~$1,325 in 2025) in an armed robbery of a Kroger store in St. Louis. He was sentenced to twenty years in prison for repeated offenses. Ray escaped from the Missouri State Penitentiary on April 23, 1967, by hiding in a truck transporting bread from the prison bakery.

== First escape aftermath ==
After escaping, Ray stayed on the move throughout the United States and Canada, going first to St. Louis and then onward to Chicago, Toronto, Montreal, and Birmingham, Alabama. He arrived in Birmingham, Alabama on August 26, 1967. While there, Ray purchased a white 1966 Ford Mustang for $1,995 in cash on August 30 from a newspaper ad he answered the previous day.

Ray applied for and received an Alabama driver's license under the name Eric Starvo Galt with license #2848947. Also in Birmingham, he bought a .38 revolver at some point, which Ray later had with him when he was arrested in London. Ray then left Alabama going to Mexico, stopping in Acapulco, before settling in Puerto Vallarta on October 19.

While in Mexico, Ray using the alias Eric Starvo Galt, attempted to establish himself as a pornographic film director. Using mail-ordered equipment, Ray filmed and photographed local prostitutes. Frustrated with his results and jilted by the prostitute with whom he had formed a relationship, Ray left Mexico on or around November 16, 1967, arriving in Los Angeles three days later. While there, Ray attended a local bartending school and took dance lessons.

Ray's chief interest was the Democrat George Wallace presidential campaign, and Ray was quickly drawn to Wallace's segregationist platform, spending much of his time in Los Angeles volunteering at the Wallace campaign headquarters in North Hollywood.

Ray considered emigrating to Rhodesia (now Zimbabwe), where a predominantly white minority regime had unilaterally assumed independence from the United Kingdom in 1965. The notion of living in Rhodesia continued to appeal to Ray for several years, and it was his intended destination after King's assassination. The Rhodesian government expressed its disapproval.

== Activity in early 1968 ==
On March 5, 1968, Ray had an operation on his nose, performed by physician Russell Hadley. Less than two weeks later, on March 18, Ray left Los Angeles and began a cross-country drive to Atlanta, Georgia.

Arriving in Atlanta on March 24, Ray checked into a rooming house. He bought a map of the city. FBI agents later found this map when they searched the room. On the map, the locations of the church and residence of Martin Luther King Jr. were circled.

Ray was soon on the road again and drove his Mustang to Birmingham, Alabama. There, on March 30, he bought a Remington Model 760 Gamemaster .30-06-caliber rifle and a box of 20 cartridges from the Aeromarine Supply Company. Ray also bought a Redfield 2x–7x scope, which he had mounted to the rifle.

Ray told the store owners that he was going on a hunting trip with his brother. Ray had continued using the Galt alias after his stint in Mexico, but when he made this purchase, he gave his name as Harvey Lowmeyer.

After purchasing the rifle and accessories, Ray drove back to Atlanta. An avid newspaper reader, Ray passed his time reading The Atlanta Constitution. The paper reported King's planned return trip to Memphis, Tennessee, which was scheduled for April 1. On April 2, Ray packed a bag and drove to Memphis.

== Assassination of Martin Luther King Jr. ==
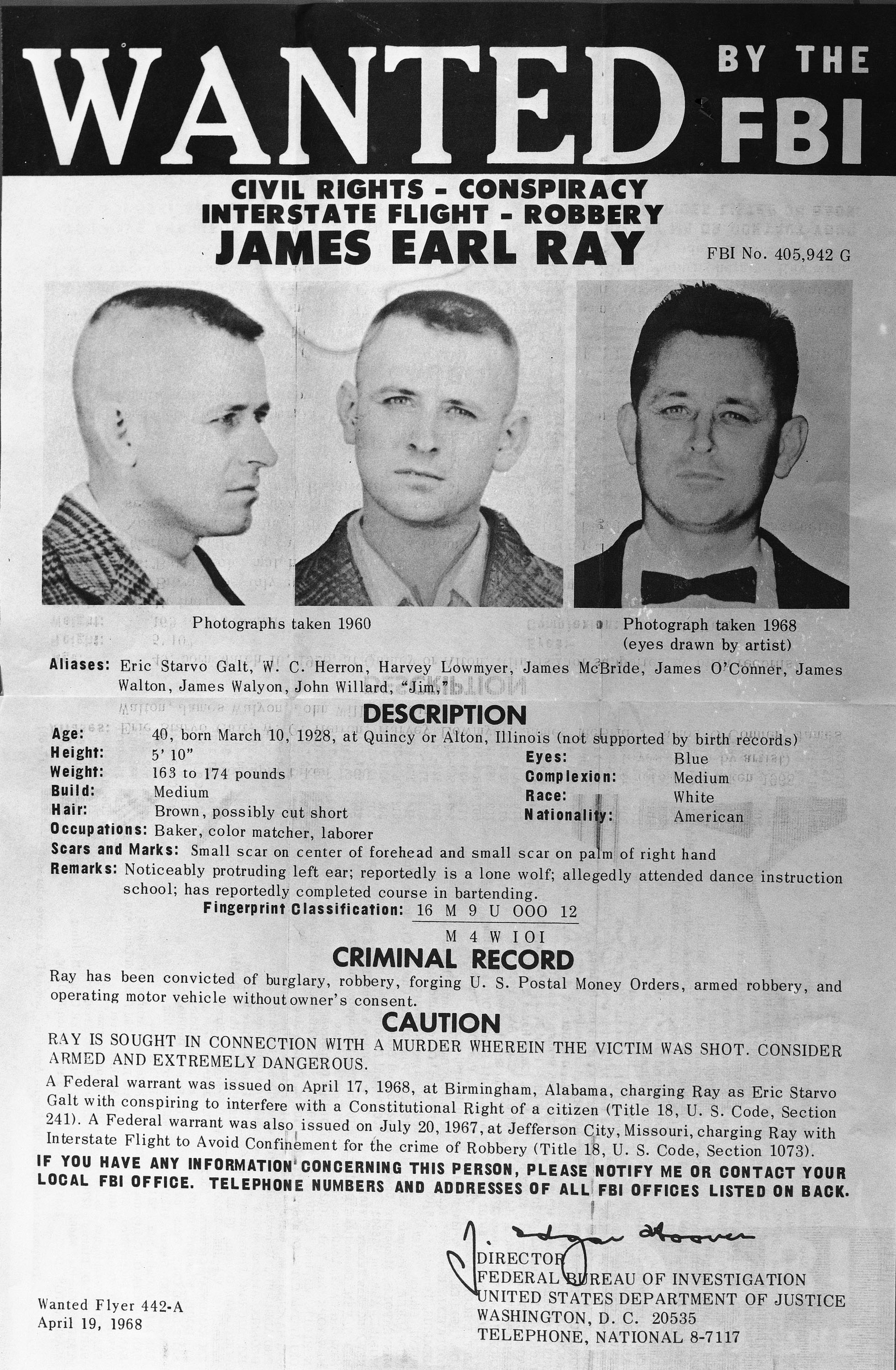
FBI most wanted fugitive poster of James Earl Ray

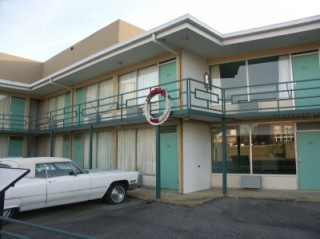
The Lorraine Motel, now known as the National Civil Rights Museum, where King was shot

On April 3, 1968, Ray rented a room for the night at the New Rebel Motel in Memphis, Tennessee. The following day, he checked into a rooming house which was managed by Bessie Brewer across the street from the Lorraine Motel.

Ray rented a room under the name John Willard, initially staying in room 8, but later changing to room 5B, which had a direct view of the Lorraine Motel. That same day, he bought a pair of binoculars.

Ray locked himself in the bathroom, stood in the bathtub, opened the window and, at 6:01 PM, he fired a single shot at Martin Luther King Jr. with a Remington rifle while King was standing on the second-floor balcony of the Lorraine Motel. Ray then fled the rooming house, dropping a package that included a rifle and binoculars with his fingerprints.

=== Apprehension and plea ===
Ray fled to Atlanta in his white Ford Mustang, taking his belongings with him and driving for eleven hours. The trip took longer than Ray thought because he avoided main roads to prevent getting caught and arrived in Atlanta during "the early morning hours of April 5" leaving his car in a housing project's parking lot in Atlanta upon arriving. His car was later discovered by the authorities on April 11 when someone called the police reporting the car.

While in Atlanta, Ray went to a rooming house to get his pistol and later cleaned it for prints. Ray also went to a laundromat to pick up clothing he had dropped off a few days prior. Ray then boarded a bus bound for Cincinnati at 1:30 PM that day. The bus arrived in Cincinnati on April 6 at 1:30 AM, where he got onto another bus bound for Detroit. Once in Detroit, Ray took a cab to nearby Windsor in Canada.

Upon arriving in Canada, Ray took a train from Windsor to Toronto and got to a rooming house in Toronto at 5 PM. He stole a Canadian's identity while there to acquire a passport by pretending to be a passport official and calling a man named Ramon Sneyd asking if he had a passport. When Sneyd said "no", Ray got a passport in his name.

On May 2, Ray paid for a round-trip plane ticket to London with the plane leaving four days later and arriving the following morning. On the round-ticket, he was scheduled to return to Canada on May 21, but instead Ray decided to replace the return part of his ticket with a ticket to Lisbon, Portugal on May 7 where he arrived at that same day.

Ray stayed briefly in Lisbon, Portugal, and returned to London on May 17. He robbed the Trustee Savings Bank of London branch in Fulham stealing £150 (approx. £2,360 in 2026) on June 4. That same day, Ray called The Daily Telegraph, and requested to talk to Ian Colvin, the newspaper's foreign correspondent in Africa and the Middle East, whose articles about Africa he claimed to have read, and asked to be connected to former British Army Commandant Alistair Wicks about the possibility of becoming a mercenary in Africa. Ray contacted Colvin again on June 6 after no contact from Wicks. Colvin told Ray that it was not a good time to become a mercenary, but nevertheless gave him an address in Brussels.

On June 6, Ray was arrested at London Heathrow Airport by a Special Branch officer, Philip Birch, as he attempted to leave the UK for Brussels. Ray was trying to depart the UK for Angola, Rhodesia or South Africa using the false Canadian passport. At check-in, the ticket agent noticed the name on his passport, Sneyd, was on a Royal Canadian Mounted Police watchlist.

Airport officials noticed that Ray carried another passport under a second name. The UK quickly extradited Ray to Tennessee, where he was charged with King's murder. Ray confessed to the crime on March 10, 1969, his 41st birthday, and after pleading guilty, he was sentenced by Judge W. Preston Battle to 99 years in prison.

=== Recanting of confession ===
Three days later, Ray recanted his confession. He had entered a guilty plea on the advice of his attorney, Percy Foreman, to avoid the sentence of death by electrocution, which would have been a possible outcome of a jury trial. However, unbeknownst to Ray, a death sentence would have been commuted as unconstitutional under the de facto moratorium in place since 1967 and following Furman v. Georgia.

Ray dismissed Foreman as his attorney and thereafter derisively called him "Percy Fourflusher". Ray began claiming that a man he had met in Montreal back in 1967, who used the alias "Raoul", had been involved in the assassination, and he asserted that he did not "personally shoot Dr. King," but may have been "partially responsible without knowing it", hinting at a conspiracy. Ray told journalist William Bradford Huie his version of the assassination and his flight during the following two months.

Huie investigated this story and discovered that Ray lied about some details. Ray told Huie that he purposely left the rifle with his fingerprints on it in plain sight at the crime scene because he wanted to become a famous criminal. Ray was convinced that he would escape capture because of his intelligence and cunning, and Ray also believed that Governor of Alabama George Wallace would soon be elected to the presidency, so that Ray would only be confined in prison for a short time, pending a presidential pardon by Wallace.

In December 1973, Ray filed a $500,000 lawsuit against Tennessee seeking his release from prison on the grounds that crucial evidence in his case was mishandled by his attorney Percy Foreman, who pressured him to plead guilty. However, Foreman denied Ray's allegations, saying that he "spent approximately 20 hours over 4 1/2 days cross-examing Ray… At no time did he ever implicate anything or anybody other than himself." Ray spent the rest of his life unsuccessfully attempting to withdraw his guilty plea and secure a jury trial.

== Second escape from prison ==
On June 10, 1977, Ray and six other convicts escaped from Brushy Mountain State Penitentiary in Petros, Tennessee. They were recaptured three days later. A year was added to Ray's previous sentence, increasing it to a full century. This escape inspired the Barkley Ultra race. It is a 100-mile race in the wilderness around the mountains which Ray had run to during the escape. This is mentioned in the Netflix Documentary by the founder of the Barkley.

== Conspiracy allegations ==
=== House Select Committee on Assassinations ===
External videos
- Interview with James Earl Ray by John Auble (November 3, 1977). KST-TV, St. Louis.

Ray hired Jack Kershaw as his new attorney, and Kershaw publicly argued and promoted Ray's claim that he was not responsible for the assassination of King. His claim was that the assassination was the result of a conspiracy of the otherwise unidentified man named "Raoul" who was a blond Cuban. Kershaw and his client met with representatives of the United States House Select Committee on Assassinations (HSCA) and convinced the committee to conduct ballistics tests that they believed would prove Ray had not fired the fatal shot. The tests ultimately proved inconclusive.

Kershaw claimed the prison escape was additional proof that Ray had been involved in a conspiracy that had provided him with the outside assistance he would have needed to break out of prison. Kershaw convinced Ray to submit to a polygraph test as part of an interview with Playboy. The magazine reported that the test results showed "Ray did, in fact, kill Martin Luther King Jr. and that he did so alone." Ray then fired Kershaw after discovering the attorney had been paid $11,000 (~$58,443 in 2025) by the magazine in exchange for the interview and instead hired attorney Mark Lane to provide him with legal representation.

=== Mock trial and civil suit ===
In 1997, King's son, Dexter, met with Ray at the prison and asked him, "I just want to ask you, for the record, did you kill my father?" Ray replied, "No. No I didn't." Dexter told Ray that he, along with the rest of the King family, believed Ray, and the family also urged publicly that Ray be granted a new trial. William Pepper, a friend of King during the last year of his life, represented Ray in a mock trial televised by HBO in an attempt to grant him the trial he never received. In the mock trial, the prosecutor was Hickman Ewing. The mock trial jury acquitted Ray.

In 1998, and continuing into 1999, Pepper represented the King family in a wrongful death civil suit against Memphis restaurant owner Loyd Jowers, whose restaurant was near the Lorraine Motel. They sued Jowers for participation in a conspiracy to murder King. Rendering their verdict on December 8 of that year, the jury found that Jowers and others, including government agencies, had conspired to murder King, and he was therefore legally liable to pay compensation to the King family. The family accepted $100 in restitution to demonstrate they were not pursuing the case for financial gain, and they publicly stated that Ray, in their opinion, had nothing to do with the assassination.

Coretta Scott King said, "The jury was clearly convinced by the extensive evidence that was presented during the trial that, in addition to Mr. Jowers, the conspiracy of the Mafia, local, state and federal government agencies, were deeply involved in the assassination of my husband. The jury also affirmed overwhelming evidence that identified someone else, not James Earl Ray, as the shooter, and that Mr. Ray was set up to take the blame."

Prompted by the King family's acceptance of some of the claims of conspiracy, United States Attorney General Janet Reno ordered a new investigation on August 26, 1998. On June 9, 2000, the United States Department of Justice released a 150-page report rejecting allegations that there was a conspiracy to assassinate King, including the determination of the Memphis civil court jury.

== Death ==
In 1996, Ray was transferred to the Lois M. DeBerry Special Needs Facility in Nashville, a maximum-security prison with hospital facilities.

Ray died on April 23, 1998, at age 70, at the Nashville Memorial Hospital in Madison, Tennessee, from complications related to kidney disease and liver failure caused by hepatitis C, having served 29 years in prison. His brother Jerry told CNN that his brother did not want to be buried or have his final resting place in the United States because of the way the government had treated him. Ray was cremated and his ashes were flown to Ireland, the home of his maternal family's ancestors. The funeral was held at the Metropolitan Interdenominational Church in Nashville.

Ten years later, Ray's other brother, John Larry, co-authored a book with Lyndon Barsten titled Truth At Last: The Untold Story Behind James Earl Ray and the Assassination of Martin Luther King Jr.

== Sources ==
- Sides, Hampton (2010). Hellhound on His Trail: The Stalking of Martin Luther King, Jr., and the International Hunt for His Assassin. New York: Doubleday. ISBN 978-0-385-52392-9.
