= Martin Luther King Jr. assassination conspiracy theories =

King assassination conspiracy theories

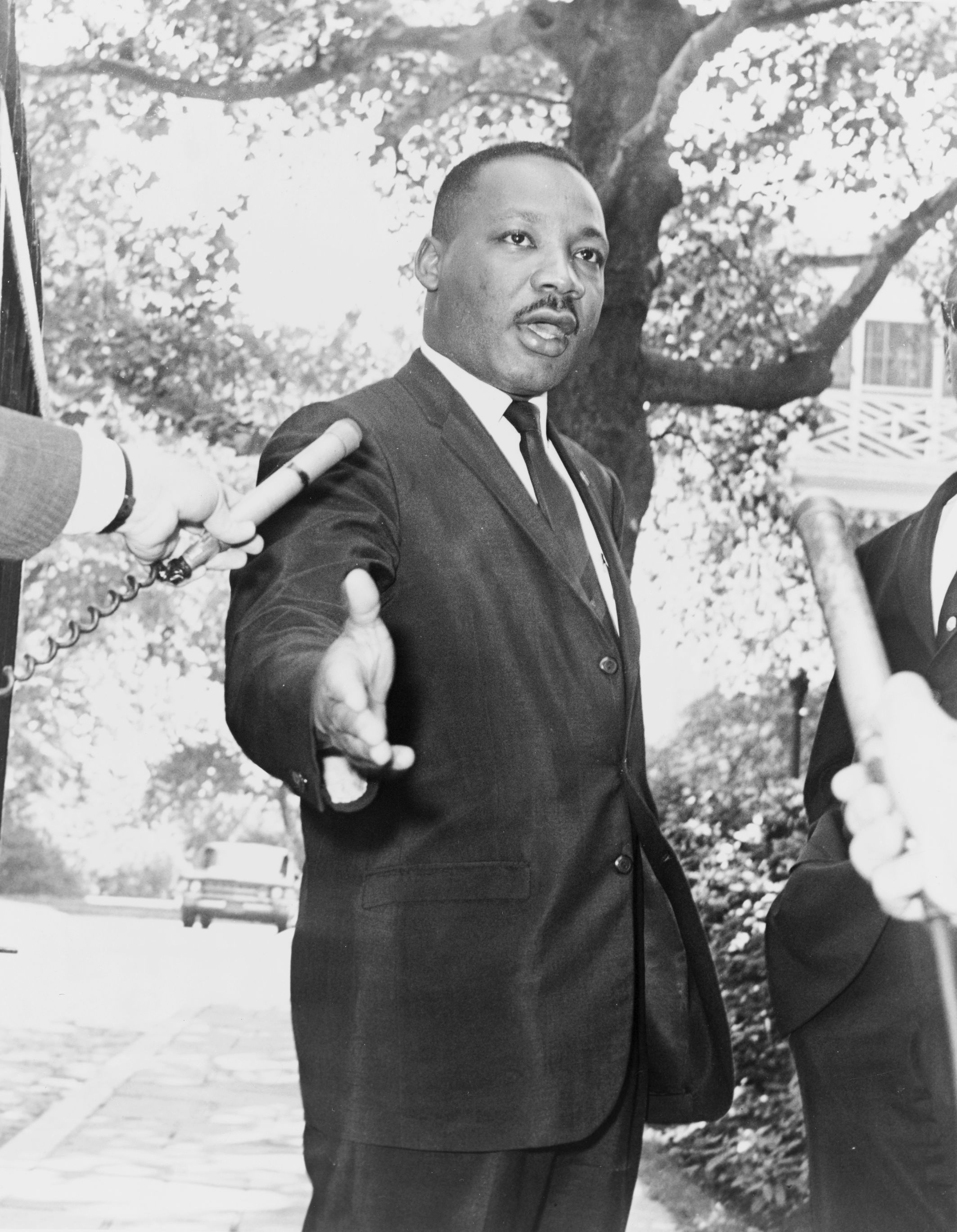
Martin Luther King Jr. in 1964

Conspiracy theories about the assassination of Martin Luther King Jr. on April 4, 1968, in Memphis, Tennessee, relate to different accounts of the assassination. King was shot on the balcony of the Lorraine Motel, the day after giving his final speech "I've Been to the Mountaintop." Claims soon arose regarding suspicious aspects of King's assassination and the controversial role of the alleged assassin, James Earl Ray, who was convicted of the murder. Although his guilty plea eliminated the possibility of a trial before a jury, within days Ray recanted and claimed his confession was forced. Suspicions were further raised by confirmed illegal surveillance of King by the Federal Bureau of Investigation (FBI) and the Central Intelligence Agency (CIA), and the FBI's attempt to prompt King to commit suicide.

In 1979, the United States House Select Committee on Assassinations (HSCA) concluded that there was a likelihood of a conspiracy in the assassination of King and Ray was a scapegoat. In 1999, a mixed-race jury in a Memphis civil suit against Loyd Jowers reached a unanimous verdict that King was assassinated as a result of a conspiracy involving the U.S. government and a person named Raoul, among others. After the verdict, Coretta King said: "There is abundant evidence of a major, high-level conspiracy in the assassination of my husband." The jury found the Mafia and various local, state, and federal government agencies were "deeply involved in the assassination. ... Mr. Ray was set up to take the blame."

== Background ==
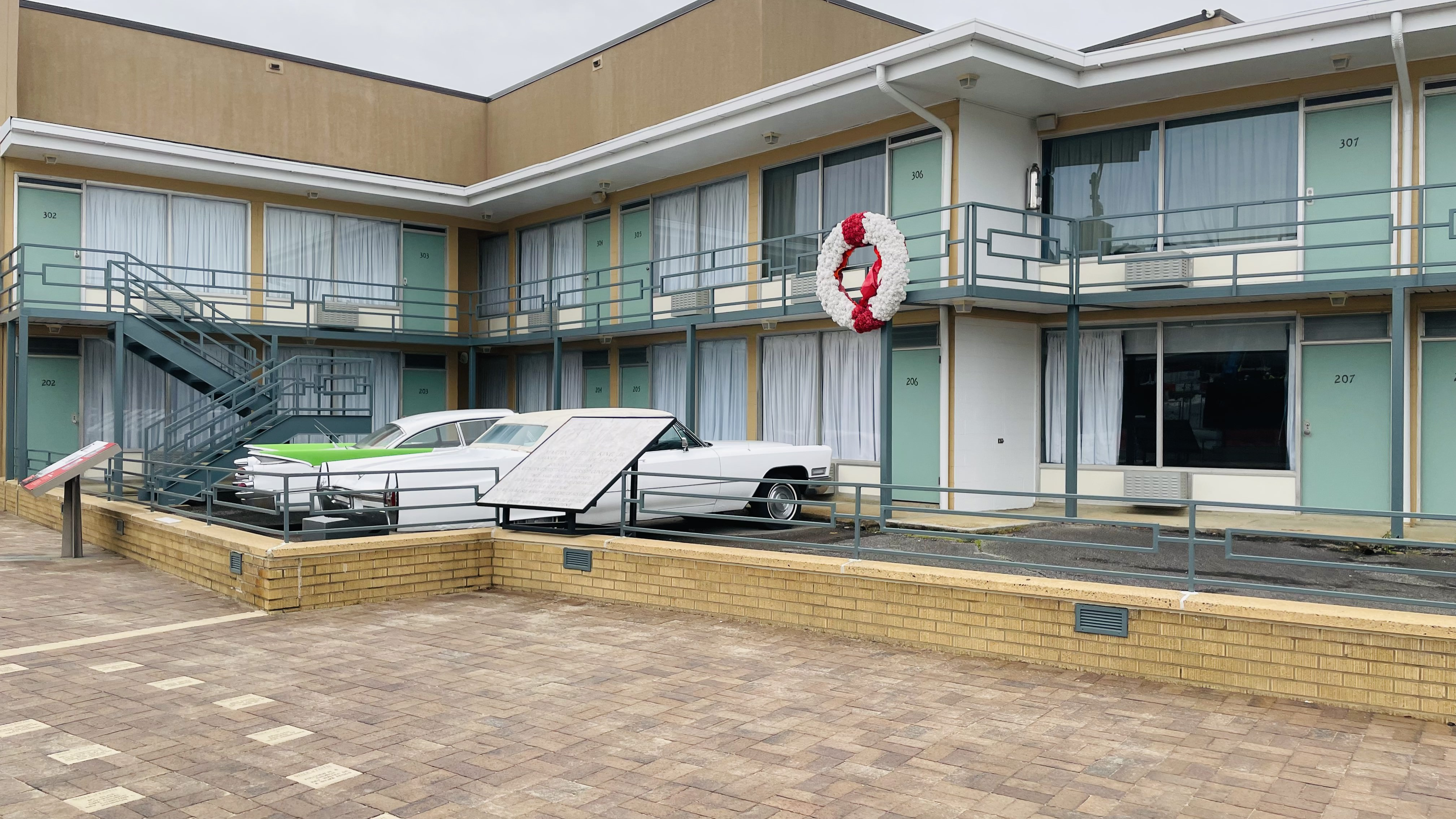
The Lorraine Motel, a wreath marks where King was standing when he was shot.

Martin Luther King Jr. arrived in Memphis, Tennessee to support a strike by Black sanitation workers in April 1968. On April 4, the day after delivering his "I've Been to the Mountaintop," speech, King was fatally shot on the balcony outside room 306 at the Lorraine Motel. At the time of the shooting, he was standing on the second floor balcony. King's last words were spoken to musician Ben Branch, who was scheduled to perform that night at a planned event. King said: "Ben, make sure you play 'Take My Hand, Precious Lord' in the meeting tonight. Play it real pretty."

Soloman Jones was a volunteer who often drove King around town when he was in Memphis. After he heard the shot, he ran into the street. He related what he saw to the police that night, "I could see a person in the thicket on the west side of Mulberry with his back to me, looked like he had a hood over his head." The next day, Memphis public work employees removed the bushes, destroying the crime scene.

=== James Earl Ray ===
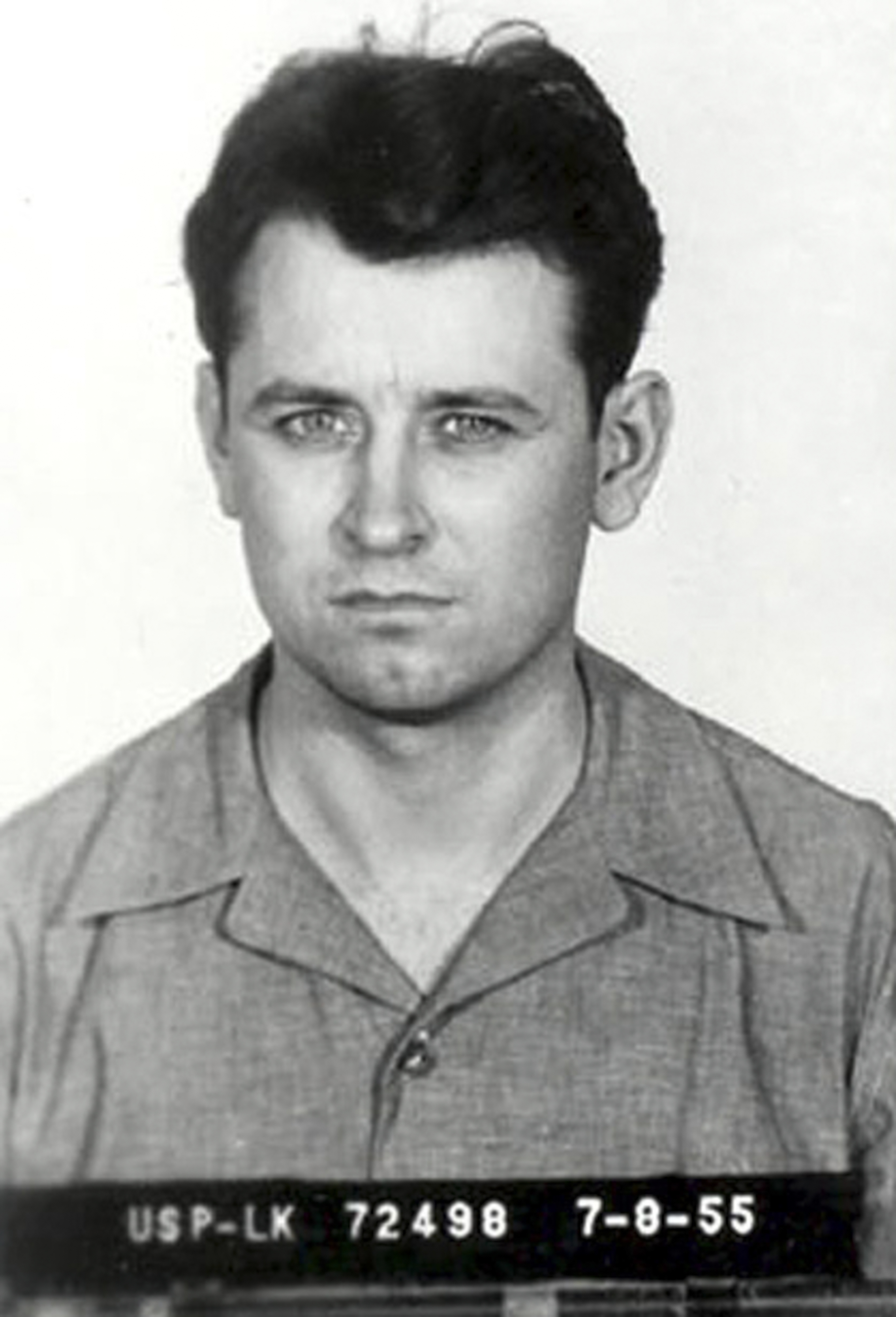
James Earl Ray

James Earl Ray was born into poverty in 1928 outside St. Louis. He served in West Germany after World War II before he was dishonorably discharged. He traveled to Los Angeles, where he robbed a cafe and was sentenced to 90 days. In 1955, after a series of bungled crimes ranging from robbing a taxi driver of 11 dollars to robbing a post office, he was sentenced to 45 months at the Federal Penitentiary in Leavenworth, Kansas. He was paroled in 1959. On October 10, 1959, Ray and James Owens, another ex-convict, robbed a Kroger grocery store in St. Louis. Ray was given a 20-year sentence at the Missouri State Penitentiary. On April 23, 1967, Ray escaped from the prison by hiding in a bakery delivery truck. Ray claimed that he then became a gunrunner with a blond Cuban handler named "Raoul". Ray stated that Raoul directed him to purchase the rifle used in the assassination and to stay at the Lorraine Hotel.

On the afternoon of April 4, Ray checked into a boarding house in Memphis, which had a bar called Jim’s Grill on the first floor. He paid $8.50 for a week's stay. The rear of the boarding house faced the Lorraine Motel across Mulberry Street. Ray was identified through fingerprints found on the gun he left behind, Martin Luther King III said, "That weapon was not the weapon. You're going to kill somebody and then drop the gun right there?"

On April 24, James Earl Ray obtained a Canadian passport and purchased plane tickets from Toronto to London, where he was apprehended by the FBI on June 8. He was allegedly trying to reach the white-minority-ruled Rhodesia. On March 10, 1969, Ray plead guilty to murdering King and received a 99-year prison sentence, thereby avoiding a trial. His plea saved him from the likelihood of the death penalty. During his sentencing hearing, Ray "leapt to his feet" when the prosecution and his defense lawyer, Percy Foreman, agreed that there was no conspiracy. Ray explained that his guilty plea did not necessarily mean others were not involved. But a few days after his plea, Ray recanted his confession and claimed he was innocent.

In 1998, Ray died in prison of complications due to a chronic hepatitis C infection. Ray's cremated remains were distributed in Ireland because he did not want his final resting place to be in the United States due to "the way the government [had] treated him."

== Proponents ==
=== William F. Pepper ===
James Earl Ray's claims of innocence attracted William Pepper, who had been a friend of King and would spend much of his later life fighting for Ray's release. The Southern Christian Leadership Conference (SCLC) has applauded Pepper for his "unceasing commitment in the pursuit of justice". Pepper's appeals to higher courts, and even the Supreme Court, failed. According to Pepper, "It looked like we were at the end of the road and then I came up with an idea, 'Well, look, why don't we try to have a real trial on television?" A mock trial was broadcast on HBO. The television jury found Ray not guilty.

In June 1997, Pepper appeared on ABC's Turning Point. He discussed the theory from his book Orders to Kill: The Truth Behind the Murder of Martin Luther King Jr. This theory held that a hit team from the 20th Special Forces Group was to kill King if a police sharpshooter failed. This group was supposedly led by a man named Billy Eidson, whom Pepper claimed had since been killed in a cover up. Eidson was then brought on camera and refused to shake Pepper's hand. Eidson brought a $15 million lawsuit against Pepper's publisher which was later settled for an undisclosed amount.

=== Mark Lane ===
Mark Lane, who was famous for John F. Kennedy assassination conspiracy theories, was Ray's lawyer for a time. He alleged that Ray was an innocent pawn in a government plot. Lane wrote Murder In Memphis with Dick Gregory (previously titled Code Name Zorro, after the Central Intelligence Agency's name for King) about the assassination of King, in which he alleged a conspiracy and government coverup. Lane represented James Earl Ray, King's alleged assassin, before the House Select Committee on Assassinations (HSCA) inquiry in 1978. The HSCA said of Lane in its report, "Many of the allegations of conspiracy that the committee investigated were first raised by Mark Lane". Lane wrote an audio docu-drama "Trial of James Earl Ray" that was broadcast on KPFK on April 3, 1978, casting doubt on Ray's guilt.

== Ballistics ==
The FBI's original tests on the bullet that killed King and the .30-06 hunting rifle were inconclusive. In 1997, tests were run comparing 12 test bullets from the alleged murder rifle, and the bullet that killed MLK. According to an affidavit filed by James Earl Ray's attorneys, unique barrel markings could not be found on the killing bullet.

== Prior harassment from the FBI ==
A nearly unredacted copy of part of the letter sent to King from the FBI. More portions of the letter were later made public in 2014.

King had long found enemies among the nation's top body of law enforcement, the FBI. J. Edgar Hoover, the Director of the FBI, pronounced him, "the most notorious liar in the country". King had been under FBI surveillance since the Montgomery Bus Boycott in 1956. They began wiretapping his phones in 1963. King expressed his anger towards the FBI in 1964, declaring that it was "completely ineffectual in resolving the continued mayhem and brutality inflicted upon the Negro in the deep South". After King's death, the FBI led the investigation into the assassination. On November 1, 1971, former head of FBI Intelligence Operations William C. Sullivan testified before the Senate Select Committee to Study Governmental Operations with Respect to Intelligence Activities. He stated that in the "war" against King "no holds were barred". An internal FBI document expressed concern that this might raise the suspicion of FBI involvement in the assassination.

An FBI file less than a month before Luther's assassination titled Martin Luther King Jr., A Current Analysis

The FBI tried to paint King as a Communist. In 1962, Hoover told then Attorney General Robert F. Kennedy that King was "a secret member of the Communist Party", which led Kennedy to approve wiretaps. Other FBI documents claimed, "King has been described within the Communist Party USA as a true, genuine Marxist-Leninist 'from the top of his head to the tips of his toes". As late as three weeks before King's killing, internal FBI documents attacked King for his "whole hearted" Communism and his "Marxist-Leninist line". After repeated claims of King's and the Civil Rights Movement's links to Communism, King declared that he was "sick and tired of people saying this movement has been infiltrated by Communists ... There are as many Communists in this freedom movement as there are Eskimos in Florida."

The FBI had long attempted to discredit King's personal life. In a memo, Hoover said that King was "a tom cat with obsessive degenerate sexual urges". FBI documents claimed, regarding an attendant at one of King's conferences, "One Negro minister in attendance later expressed his disgust with the behind-the scene drinking, fornication, and homosexuality." The document also alleged: "Several Negro and white prostitute[s] were brought in from the Miami area. An all-night sex orgy was held with these prostitutes and some of the delegates." On one occasion, the FBI mailed alleged sex-tapes of King's adultery and a letter to King in an attempt to destroy his marriage. But his wife, Coretta Scott King, later remarked that, "I couldn't make much out of it, it was just a lot of mumbo jumbo." The letter accused King of being "sexually psychotic," and a "colossal fraud". The letter warned King that "your end is approaching" and that he was "done". Despite popular belief that it was intended to convince King to commit suicide, it remains unclear what the intention of a letter which the FBI mailed to King shortly before he accepted the Nobel Peace Prize was, with the full letter, which was made public in 2014, suggesting that the FBI preferred "older leaders" in the civil right movement such as Roy Wilkins.

== Memphis Police Department ==
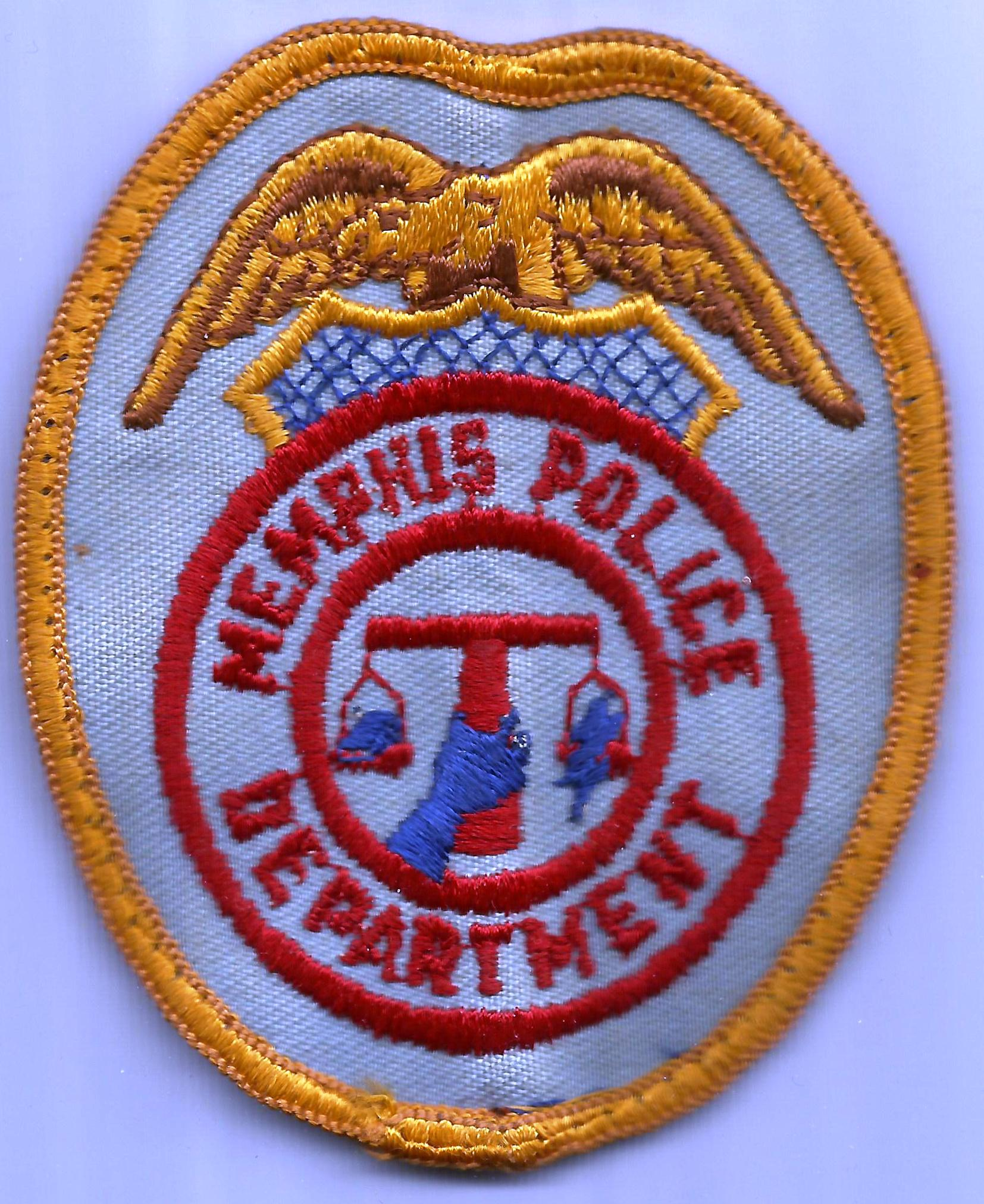
The Memphis Police Department patch

Upset over King's march, the City of Memphis filed a formal complaint against King and the SCLC. When Dr. King returned to Memphis on April 3, 1968, he was put under surveillance by the MPD. He was followed at the airport by two Black plain-clothes cops, one of which was Detective Edward E. Redditt. At the same time, the Memphis police also assigned four men to protect King. King's entourage told the police that they had not requested their help. When the police asked where King was staying, Reverend James Lawson replied, "We have not fully made up our minds." The police still followed King to the Lorraine Motel. The police protection remained near King until they were recalled to the police station at 5:05. One of the four men, Inspector Tines, later stated that this call-back was not planned and that he did not know why it happened. The MPD Chief Macdonald claimed to have no memory of this police protection or of any "call-back".

At the nearby Fire Station No. 2, the two Black detectives continued their surveillance of King. Shortly after midday, Detective Redditt received a threatening phone call from a woman, telling him that "he was doing the Black people wrong". Redditt and his associate were then told to return to the police station. Redditt was told that threats had been made on his life and that his family must stay at a local motel under an assumed name. As a police car arrived on the radio, he heard of King's assassination. Within the next few days, Redditt heard no more about the alleged threats. Two Black firemen there were also given the day off. According to the FBI, this station had an "excellent vantage point" of the Lorraine Motel. The MPD also infiltrated the Invaders, a local Black militant group which often provided protection for King. The single informant began surveilling in February 1968, just two months before King's assassination. The informant was present in the motel courtyard when King was assassinated. Besides its own infiltration, the MPD was itself infiltrated by the FBI. The FBI had five paid informants within the Memphis Police Department.

== Views ==
=== Public opinion ===
A 1968 Gallup poll found that 82% of African-Americans believed that King's murder was the result of a conspiracy. A 2008 CNN poll found that this view was still largely popular among African-Americans, with 86% answering in the affirmative that there was a conspiracy. A 1976 Harris poll found 60% of Americans believe there was a conspiracy, while a later 2008 CNN poll found it was 55%. In 1998, a CBS poll found 70% of those questioned accepted there was a conspiracy.

=== King family and associates ===
The King family has long been outspoken about their belief in a conspiracy and Ray's innocence. King's youngest son, Dexter, met with Ray in prison in 1997 where he said to Ray, "Well, as awkward as this may seem, I want you to know that I believe you and my family believes you, and we are going to do everything in our power to try and make sure that justice will prevail. And while it's at the 11th hour, I've always been a spiritual person and I believe in Providence." King's daughter Bernice King has said, "It pains my heart that James Earl Ray had to spend his life in prison paying for things he didn't do." She has also said, "I'm certainly clear that there has been a conspiracy, from the government down to the mafia." King's wife, Coretta Scott King told a press conference in 1999: "There is abundant evidence of a major high-level conspiracy ... The Mafia, local, state and federal government agencies, were deeply involved in the assassination of my husband ... Mr Ray was set up to take the blame."

Many who worked with King also believe in the likelihood of a conspiracy. "I think there was a major conspiracy to remove Doctor King from the American scene," said the Democratic Representative John Lewis, "I don't know what happened, but the truth of what happened to Dr. King should be made available for history's sake." Andrew Young, the former U.N. ambassador and Atlanta mayor who was at the Lorraine Motel with King when he was assassinated, shares that sentiment: "I would not accept the fact that James Earl Ray pulled the trigger, and that's all that matters." James Lawson was a pastor in Memphis and one of Martin Luther King Jr.'s mentors. He began visiting Ray in prison in 1969. "There were things in Memphis that were suspicious and raised questions in my mind," he said regarding the assassination. "I never saw those questions answered. I'm satisfied beyond a shadow of a doubt that James Earl Ray neither pulled the trigger nor plotted to kill Martin Luther King."

== Government investigations ==
=== The House Select Committee on Assassinations ===
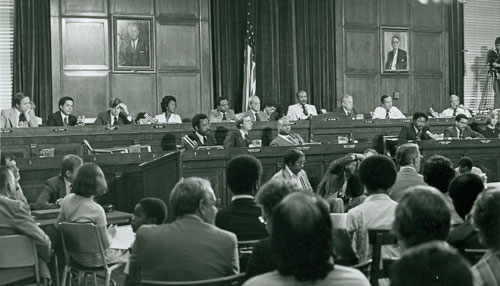
The House Select Committee on Assassinations

The United States House Select Committee on Assassinations (HSCA) was established in 1976 to investigate the assassinations of John F. Kennedy and King. In 1979, their final report concluded that "After examining Ray's behaviour, his character and his racial attitudes... The committee found it could not concur with any of the accepted explanations for Ray as a lone assassin," the “predominant motive lay in an expectation of monetary gain” and that "The committee concluded that there was a likelihood of conspiracy in the assassination of Dr King." They asserted that it was most likely a conspiracy by southern white supremacist groups, and that Ray was only acting due to a bounty on King's head. They also noted that “No federal, state or local government agency was involved in the assassination of Dr King.” The HSCA's Chief Counsel, Robert Blakey, stated that if the CIA or FBI had been involved, all incriminating documents were likely destroyed long before 1979. This same committee also found that there was a conspiracy while reviewing the assassination of Kennedy.

=== Memphis civil suit ===
In 1993, Loyd Jowers appeared on the ABC News program Prime Time Live. He claimed that he was paid $100,000 by alleged local mobster Frank Liberto to help organize King's assassination. Jowers ran a coffee shop on the first floor of the rooming house from which King was allegedly shot by Ray. The backdoor of his shop led to the bushes which were removed by the MPD. Jowers had remained silent for twenty-five years after King's assassination, but he only produced his confession after Ray's HBO mock trial. He claimed that he was part of a larger conspiracy to assassinate King and frame Ray as a patsy. He claimed that "Raul", Memphis Police Officers, and the Mafia had been involved. Jowers named Memphis Police Lieutenant Earl Clark as the shooter instead.

In 1999, a civil suit brought by Coretta Scott King alleged that Jowers and others had conspired to assassinate King. The King Family turned to William Pepper, who had defended Ray in his HBO mock trial, to represent them in the wrongful death lawsuit, "King family vs. Loyd Jowers and other unknown co-conspirators". During the four-week trial, Pepper brought forward over 70 witnesses and thousands of documents. Jowers testified that Ray was only a scapegoat and that Memphis police officer Earl Clark actually fired the fatal shots.

The mixed-race jury that heard the case took only one hour of deliberations to reach a unanimous verdict: that King was assassinated as a result of a conspiracy. They found Jowers responsible, and also found that "governmental agencies" were among the conspirators. The King family was granted the $100 they requested in damages. The King family saw it as vindication. King's son, Dexter, said "This is the period at the end of the sentence. So please, after today, we don't want questions like, 'Do you believe James Earl Ray killed your father?' I've been hearing that all my life. No, I don't, and this is the end of it." Dexter further emphasized that "the shooter was the Memphis Police Department Officer, Lt. Earl Clark". His wife Coretta King said after the verdict, "There is abundant evidence of a major, high-level conspiracy in the assassination of my husband." The jury found that the Mafia and various government agencies "were deeply involved in the assassination. ... Mr. Ray was set up to take the blame."

In 2000, Attorney General Janet Reno announced that, after re-examining the assassination, no evidence of a conspiracy could be found. The Department of Justice found numerous inconsistencies in Jowers' statements. It also concluded there was no proof Frank Liberto belonged to the Mafia and that, in its opinion, the witnesses that supported Jowers were not credible or contradictory. Furthermore, it expressed the belief that Jowers fabricated his story for financial reward.

Gerald Posner, an investigative journalist who wrote the book Killing the Dream, in which he makes the case that Ray was the killer, said after the verdict: "It distresses me greatly that the legal system was used in such a callous and farcical manner in Memphis. If the King family wanted a rubber stamp of their own view of the facts, they got it." Robert Blakey also criticized Pepper's theories on the case.

== See also ==
- Conspiracy theories in United States politics
- The death of Martin Luther King Jr.'s brother
- The assassination of Martin Luther King Jr.'s mother
- COINTELPRO
- Fred Hampton assassination
- James Bevel § King assassination (April 4, 1968)

== Bibliography ==
- Branch, Taylor (2007). At Canaan's Edge: America in the King Years, 1965–68. America in the King Years (Reprint ed.). New York City: Simon & Schuster. pp. 766, 770. ISBN 978-0-684-85713-8.
- Dyson, Michael Eric (2000). I May Not Get There with You: The True Martin Luther King, Jr. Simon and Schuster, 2000. ISBN 978-0-684-86776-2.
- Kotz, Nick (2006). "14. Another Martyr". Judgment Days : Lyndon Baines Johnson, Martin Luther King Jr., and the Laws That Changed America (Reprint ed.). Boston: Mariner Books. p. 415. ISBN 978-0-618-64183-3.
