= Loyd Jowers trial =

1999 American civil trial

King family v. Jowers and other unknown co-conspirators
- Court: The Circuit Court of Shelby County, Tennessee; Thirtieth Judicial District at Memphis, Tennessee
- Full case name: Coretta Scott King, Martin Luther King, III, Bernice King, Dexter Scott King, and Yolanda King Plaintiffs, v. Loyd Jowers, and other unknown co-conspirators, Defendants.
- Started: November 15, 1999
- Decided: December 8, 1999
- Verdict: Jury unanimously found Jowers and other unknown co-conspirators (including governmental agencies) liable of conspiring to assassinate Martin Luther King, Jr. and frame James Earl Ray as a patsy

Case history
- Subsequent action: King family awarded $100 ($193.27 today) they had requested in damages

Court membership
- Judge sitting: James E. Swearengen

Case opinions
- Decision by: Jury verdict

The Loyd Jowers trial, officially the King family vs. Loyd Jowers and other unknown co-conspirators, was an American wrongful death civil suit brought by the family of Martin Luther King Jr. against Loyd Jowers, following his claims of a conspiracy in the assassination of the civil rights leader in 1968. The jury would eventually decide in December 1999 that there was a conspiracy perpetrated by Jowers and other parties, including various United States government agencies, to murder King and frame James Earl Ray as a patsy.

== Background ==
In 1993, Loyd Jowers was interviewed on the ABC News program PrimeTime Live. He said he had been paid $100,000 by alleged Memphis mobster Frank Liberto to help organize the assassination of Martin Luther King Jr. in 1968. Jowers owned a restaurant, Jim's Grill, very near the Lorraine Motel, where King often stayed while in Memphis and where the assassination took place. Jowers claimed that besides Liberto, a man named "Raoul" and several Memphis Police Department officers were also involved in the assassination planning and execution. Jowers identified Memphis Police Lieutenant Earl Clark as the shooter.

For twenty-five years, Jowers had remained silent about King's assassination. But after consulting on an HBO documentary film in which convicted assassin James Earl Ray is allowed a mock trial and defended by attorney William Pepper, Jowers spoke to his own attorney, Lewis Garrison, about finally coming forward and giving his account of the alleged conspiracy to kill King and frame Ray for the crime.

== Trial and decision ==
In 1999, a civil suit charged that Jowers and others had conspired to assassinate King. The King family turned to William Pepper to represent them in the wrongful death lawsuit, referred to in U.S. government records as simply King v. Jowers. The trial was conducted in Shelby County Circuit Court with presiding Judge James E. Swearengen. During the three-and-one-half-week proceedings, Pepper brought forward over 70 witnesses and thousands of documents. Jowers himself did not testify. His attorney Lewis Garrison claimed that his 73-year-old client was too ill (Jowers died the following May).

The jury required only one hour of deliberations to reach a unanimous verdict that King was assassinated as a result of a conspiracy. They found Jowers responsible, and also found that government agencies were among the co-conspirators. The King family was granted the $100 they requested in damages, and they saw the verdict as vindication. King's son Dexter said, "This is the period at the end of the sentence. So please, after today, we don't want questions like, 'Do you believe James Earl Ray killed your father?' I've been hearing that all my life. No, I don't, and this is the end of it." Dexter further emphasized that "the shooter was the Memphis Police Department Officer, Lt. Earl Clark." King's youngest child Bernice told The Washington Post, "It pains my heart that James Earl Ray had to spend his life in prison paying for things he didn't do." Coretta Scott King said after the verdict: "There is abundant evidence of a major, high-level conspiracy in the assassination of my husband." She noted how the jury found that the Mafia and various government agencies "were deeply involved in the assassination.... Mr. Ray was set up to take the blame."

The U.S. mainstream press did not treat the verdict as a significant development in the MLK assassination. In its summary of the trial, The New York Times reported that "a vast conspiracy [was] alleged but not proved." The Los Angeles Times cast doubt on the validity of the King family's case, and concluded its article with a 1997 quote from a homicide detective who labeled attorney William Pepper "the biggest liar that ever hit the ground. He'll say anything in the world for a little notoriety." The Atlanta Journal-Constitution quoted King biographer Dave Garrow: "This verdict is meaningless. This will have no impact on history."

== Result and criticism ==
The result in the Jowers trial prompted the U.S. Department of Justice (DOJ) to reopen the case. In June 2000, Attorney General Janet Reno announced that, after looking into Dr. King's assassination, no evidence of a conspiracy could be found. The DOJ said that it identified numerous inconsistencies in Jowers' statements, and that the witnesses who supported Jowers during the trial were either not credible or contradictory. Moreover, it claimed there was no proof that Frank Liberto was a member of the Mafia. The DOJ suggested that Jowers fabricated his story for financial reward.

Over a decade later, the DOJ's Civil Rights Division documented its disagreements with the trial's evidence, testimony, and verdict. It stated in its conclusion: "the trial's evidence fails to establish the existence of any conspiracy to kill Dr. King. The verdict presented by the parties and adopted by the jury is incompatible with the weight of all relevant information, much of which the jury never heard. Accordingly, the conspiracy allegations presented at the trial warrant no further investigation."

Gerald Posner, an investigative journalist who wrote the 1998 book Killing the Dream in which he argues that James Earl Ray was the lone killer, said after the verdict: "It distresses me greatly that the legal system was used in such a callous and farcical manner in Memphis. If the King family wanted a rubber stamp of their own view of the facts, they got it." Robert Blakey—who led the 1970s House Select Committee on Assassinations that probed the murders of Dr. King and John F. Kennedy—also criticized the case presented by Pepper.

== See also ==
- Martin Luther King Jr. assassination conspiracy theories
