= Loyd Jowers =

American restaurateur and alleged conspirator (1926–2000)

- Jowers at the 1999 trial
- Born: November 20, 1926; Lexington, Tennessee, U.S.
- Died: May 20, 2000 (aged 73); Union City, Tennessee, U.S.
- Occupation: Restaurateur
- Known for: Alleged conspirator in the assassination of Martin Luther King Jr.

Loyd Jowers (November 20, 1926 – May 20, 2000) was an American restaurateur and the owner of Jim's Grill, a restaurant near the Lorraine Motel in Memphis, Tennessee, where Martin Luther King Jr. was assassinated in 1968. For the first 25 years after the assassination of King, Jowers testified that he was in the restaurant at the time of the assassination, a fact supported by the other witnesses in the restaurant.

In 1993, Jowers appeared on the ABC News program Prime Time Live and claimed to have been part of an alleged conspiracy involving the Mafia and the administration of Lyndon B. Johnson to kill King. According to Jowers, the alleged assassin, James Earl Ray, was a scapegoat, and was not the only person responsible for assassinating King. Jowers named a number of different people as the alleged assassins, including a black man who was in the area and an unidentified person, before later saying that he had hired Memphis police Lieutenant Earl Clark to fire the fatal shot. A civil trial in Memphis in 1999 supported this claim, while not having been shown existing evidence of Jowers' contradictions. In June 2000, the United States Department of Justice released a 150-page report denying allegations that there was a conspiracy to assassinate King.

== Martin Luther King Jr. assassination ==
In a 1993 episode of ABC's Primetime Live, Jowers told reporter Sam Donaldson that he hired someone to kill King as a favor to a friend in the mafia, produce merchant Frank Liberto. Jowers said Liberto, who had died prior to the ABC interview, had paid him $100,000 to arrange the assassination. He did not name the person he claimed to have hired, but said it was not Ray.

=== Coretta Scott King v. Loyd Jowers ===
In 1998, the King family filed a wrongful death lawsuit against Jowers and "other unknown co-conspirators" for the murder of King. The King family was represented by attorney William Pepper, who had previously served as the attorney of James Earl Ray, King's formerly accused assassin, in a televised, mock trial. According to The Washington Post, Pepper had "for years claimed the assassination was the result of a vast conspiracy involving the FBI, CIA and the Army, organized crime and various state and local officials." After four weeks of testimony which involved over 70 witnesses and thousands of pages of new evidence, a Memphis jury unanimously found, on December 8, 1999, that Jowers was part of a conspiracy to kill King, and that the assassination plot also involved "others, including governmental agencies."

At a press conference following the verdict, Coretta Scott King stated that "there is abundant evidence of a major high level conspiracy in the assassination of my husband, Martin Luther King, Jr. ... the Mafia, local, state and federal government agencies, were deeply involved in the assassination of my husband. The jury also affirmed overwhelming evidence that identified someone else, not James Earl Ray, as the shooter, and that Mr. Ray was set up to take the blame."

Following statements by Dexter King and other family members, Dexter was subsequently told by a reporter that "there are many people out there who feel that as long as these conspirators remain nameless and faceless there is no true closure, and no justice." He replied:

No, he [Mr. Lloyd Jowers] named the shooter. The shooter was the Memphis Police Department Officer, Lt. Earl Clark who he named as the killer. Once again, beyond that you had credible witnesses that named members of a Special Forces team who didn't have to act because the contract killer succeeded, with plausible denial, a Mafia contracted killer.

The Memphis county prosecutor said on several occasions that Jowers' claims were without merit and that he was motivated to sell his story for a book or a movie. Ray's lawyer claimed two sisters who worked at Jowers' restaurant would corroborate Jowers' claim, but both recanted their stories. One sister said that Jowers had fabricated the story so he could make $300,000 from selling the story; she in turn corroborated his story in order to obtain money to pay her taxes. In a telephone conversation taped by authorities, Jowers' main witness stated that his story was false.

According to the Los Angeles Times, "The trial relied heavily on second- and third-hand accounts, and the judge and jurors were often seen dozing off during testimony." John Campbell, an assistant district attorney in Memphis who was part of the criminal trial against James Earl Ray, said: "I'm not surprised by the verdict. This case overlooked so much contradictory evidence that never was presented, what other option did the jury have but to accept Mr. Pepper's version?"

Gerald Posner, an investigative journalist who wrote the book Killing the Dream, in which he makes the case that Ray was the killer, said after the verdict: "It distresses me greatly that the legal system was used in such a callous and farcical manner in Memphis. If the King family wanted a rubber stamp of their own view of the facts, they got it."

=== Justice Department investigation ===
Prompted by the King family's acceptance of some of the conspiracy theories, United States Attorney General Janet Reno ordered a new investigation on August 26, 1998. On June 9, 2000, the United States Department of Justice released a 150-page report rejecting allegations that there was a conspiracy to assassinate King, including the findings of the Memphis civil court jury. The DOJ considered suggestions by the U.S. House Select Committee on Assassinations in 1979 and the district attorney of Shelby County, Tennessee in 1998 that Ray's brothers may have been co-conspirators and stated that they "found insufficient evidentiary leads remaining after 30 years to justify further investigation."

== Death ==
On May 20, 2000, Jowers died of a heart attack at Baptist Memorial Hospital in Union City, Tennessee. He was reported to have suffered from lung cancer at the time of his death.

== See also ==
- Loyd Jowers trial
