= St. Joseph's Hospital (Memphis) =

Death site of Martin Luther King Jr.

Geography
- Location: 220 Overton Avenue, Memphis, Tennessee, United States
- Coordinates: 35.154451°N 90.046353°W

Organization
- Religious affiliation: Catholic Church

Services
- Beds: 1,212

History
- Opened: 1885 or 1889
- Closed: 2000

Links
- Lists: Hospitals in the United States

St. Joseph's Hospital was a Catholic-operated hospital located at 220 Overton Avenue in Memphis, Tennessee. It is known for being the hospital where Martin Luther King Jr. died on April 4, 1968, after he was shot at Lorraine Motel.

Erected in 1856 and operated by the Sisters of St. Francis, St. Joseph's later became a medical center with 1,212 beds. In 1997 the hospital merged with Baptist Memorial Health Care. The property and buildings were then sold to St. Jude Children's Research Hospital. The buildings, except for a recently built emergency room annex which St. Jude converted into a Translational Trials Unit, were subsequently demolished to make room for an expansion. The merger between St. Joseph's and Baptist Memorial Health Care was completed in 1998 and the last patients were transferred to Baptist on November 17, 2000.

== See also ==
Saint Joseph
