= Joseph Louw =

South African journalist and filmmaker

- Born: 4 August 1939; Kimberley, Cape Province, South Africa
- Died: 2004 (aged 64–65); Johannesburg, South Africa
- Occupations: Journalist, documentary filmmaker, photographer, television producer
- Known for: Photographing the immediate aftermath of the assassination of Martin Luther King Jr.

Joseph Louw (4 August 1939 – 2004) was a South African journalist, documentary filmmaker, photographer, and television producer. He is best known for taking photographs of the immediate aftermath of the assassination of American civil rights leader Martin Luther King Jr. in Memphis, Tennessee, on 4 April 1968. Louw was the only photographer present at the scene in the moments following the shooting, and his images became some of the most widely published photographs associated with King's death.

== Early life and education ==
Louw was born on 4 August 1939 in Kimberley, Northern Cape province, of South Africa. He attended St. Boniface High School in Galeshewe before moving to Johannesburg, where he began his career as a journalist. He worked for the Golden City Post and later for Drum magazine, becoming part of a generation of Black South African journalists documenting life under apartheid.

=== Immorality Act and exile ===
In 1961, Louw became the subject of a widely publicized prosecution under South Africa's apartheid-era Immorality Act, which prohibited intimate relationships between people classified as belonging to different racial groups. The case arose from his relationship with Pamela Beira, a white South African woman. The prosecution attracted considerable public attention and highlighted the restrictive and intrusive nature of apartheid legislation. While awaiting trial, Louw left South Africa after being released on bail. He traveled to Dar es Salaam in Tanzania, where he reunited with Beira.

His departure marked the beginning of a lengthy period of exile from South Africa. In East Africa, Louw worked as a journalist for the Daily Nation newspaper before receiving a scholarship to study at Columbia University in New York City. There he studied economics and later obtained a master's degree in journalism, specializing in television production and photography.

== Martin Luther King Jr. assassination ==
In 1968, Louw was working on a documentary about the Poor People's Campaign for the Public Broadcast Laboratory (PBL), a program associated with National Educational Television in the United States. As part of the assignment, he traveled with Martin Luther King Jr. during the final weeks of King's life.

On 4 April 1968, Louw was staying at the Lorraine Motel in Memphis, Tennessee, only a few rooms away from King. When King was shot while standing on the motel balcony, Louw rushed to the scene and photographed the immediate aftermath. His images captured King's companions pointing toward the direction of the gunman while King lay wounded on the balcony. The photographs became some of the most recognized images of the 20th century and were published internationally. Louw later covered King's funeral for Life magazine.

His work on the documentary Free at Last: Martin Luther King, Jr. (1968) earned recognition for both his photography and production work.

== Documentary and television career ==
Following his work in the United States, Louw accepted an assignment from the United Nations to produce a documentary about Nairobi. In 1970 he settled in Kenya and worked as a freelance filmmaker and journalist for various American and European media organizations. During the 1970s and 1980s, he worked on a range of documentaries focusing on African society, religion, and development. His projects included documentaries on African independent churches, African cultural life, and humanitarian issues. Louw later returned to South Africa, where he worked in television production and broadcasting, including projects for the South African Broadcasting Corporation (SABC).

== Legacy ==
Joseph Louw is remembered as one of South Africa's most accomplished documentary photographers and television producers. His photographs documenting the assassination of Martin Luther King Jr. remain among the most significant visual records of the American Civil Rights Movement. His work has been preserved by major photographic archives and continues to be reproduced in publications, documentaries, exhibitions, and studies of both the Civil Rights Movement and South African journalism.

== Death ==
Louw died in Johannesburg in 2004 at the age of 64.
