= United Women in Faith =

United Women in Faith (formerly United Methodist Women)
- Formation: 1869
- Type: Religious organization
- Legal status: 501(c)(3)
- Headquarters: Church Center for the United Nations 777 United Nations Plaza; 11th Floor; New York, New York 10017
- Location: United States
- Members: 500,000
- Official language: English
- General Secretary & CEO: Sally Vonner
- President, Board of Directors: Jana Jones
- Revenue: $22,450,000 (2021)
- Expenses: $27,540,000 (2021)
- Website: uwfaith.org

United Women in Faith (formerly known as United Methodist Women) is the only official organization for women within The United Methodist Church (UMC). In 2022, United Methodist Women began doing business as United Women in Faith (UWFaith). Founded in 1869, the organization now has nearly half a million members. UWFaith offers all Methodist women opportunities for spiritual growth, leadership development, transformative education and service and advocacy. Its current advocacy priorities are climate justice and racial justice, including ending criminalization of communities of color and mass incarceration.

== Church Involvement ==
United Women in Faith often offers presentations at General Conference for The United Methodist Church (UMC), and has taken a number of positions on social and political issues. UWFaith describes itself as open to all women and advocates for women's rights regardless of income, sexual orientation, race, age or other backgrounds.

== Social Issues ==
In 2008, the UMC voted to affirm United Methodist Women's support for pro-choice positions and organizations. In 2016, the General Conference voted in favor of United Methodist Women and the church's General Board of Church and Society withdrawing from the Religious Coalition for Reproductive Choice. However, the denomination remains pro-choice.

== Leadership ==
Sally Vonner is the general secretary and CEO of United Women in Faith.
