= Murder in Tennessee law =

Aspect of Tennessee criminal law

Murder in Tennessee law constitutes the unlawful killing, under circumstances defined by law, of people within or under the jurisdiction of the U.S. state of Tennessee.

The United States Centers for Disease Control and Prevention reported that in the year 2021, the state had a murder rate somewhat above the median for the entire country.

== Definitions ==
=== First-degree murder ===
First-degree murder is the most serious homicide offense in Tennessee. It is defined as either an intentional killing of another person with premeditation, or the killing of a person during the perpetration or attempted perpetration of one of the following felonies under Tennessee's felony murder rule:

- Arson
- Robbery
- Burglary
- Theft
- Kidnapping
- Aggravated abuse of an elderly or vulnerable adult
- Aggravated neglect of an elderly or vulnerable adult
- Aggravated child abuse
- Aggravated child neglect
- Aircraft piracy
- Throwing, placing, or discharging of a destructive device or bomb
- Terrorism
- Aggravated rape
- Rape
- Rape of a child
- Aggravated rape of child

The penalties for first-degree murder are the death penalty, life imprisonment without the possibility of parole, or life-with-parole after 51 years. The only exception for the death penalty is juvenile offenders, as the death penalty for minors was abolished nationwide in 2005. Tennessee Governor Bill Lee currently has set a moratorium on executions, citing concerns about botched executions.

=== Second-degree murder ===
Second-degree murder is the second most serious homicide offense in Tennessee. It is defined as one of the following:

- The intentional killing of another person without premeditation
- The death of another person caused by the unlawful sale of drugs
- The killing of another person as a result of domestic abuse, assault, or the infliction of bodily injury when the perpetrator should have known that the action could have resulted in death

The penalty for second-degree murder is 15 to 60 years in prison.

== Penalties ==
The penalties for homicide offenses in Tennessee are listed below.

Offense	Mandatory sentence
Criminally negligent homicide	1 to 6 years in prison
Aiding suicide	2 to 12 years in prison
Reckless homicide	2 to 12 years in prison
Third-degree vehicular homicide	2 to 12 years in prison
Second-degree vehicular homicide	3 to 15 years in prison
First-degree vehicular homicide	8 to 30 years in prison
Voluntary manslaughter	8 to 30 years in prison
Second degree murder	15 to 60 years in prison
First degree murder (no aggravating circumstances)	Life (minimum of 51 years; 25 years if the defendant was a juvenile)
First degree murder (aggravating circumstances)	Death, life without parole, or life (minimum of 51 years; 25 years if the defendant was a juvenile)
