= William F. Pepper =

American lawyer (1937–2024)

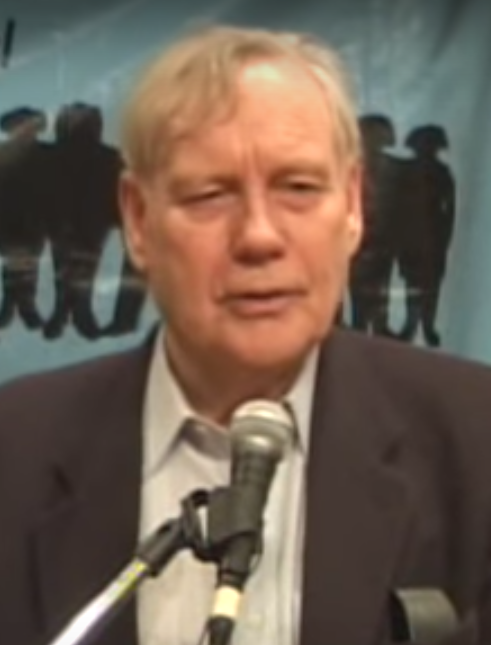
- Born: William Francis Pepper; August 16, 1937; New York City, U.S.
- Died: April 7, 2024 (aged 86); New York City, U.S.
- Education: Columbia University (BA, MA); London School of Economics (MA); University of Massachusetts Amherst (EdD); Boston College (JD)
- Occupation: Lawyer
- Spouse: Mina Pepper
- Children: Lilly Pepper

William Francis Pepper (August 16, 1937 – April 7, 2024) was an American lawyer who was based in New York City and noted for his efforts to prove government culpability and the innocence of James Earl Ray in the assassination of Martin Luther King, Jr. Pepper also tried to prove the innocence of Sirhan Sirhan in the assassination of Robert F. Kennedy. He was the author of several books, and had been active in other government conspiracy cases, including the 9/11 Truth movement, and had advocated that George W. Bush be charged with war crimes.

== Early life ==
William Francis Pepper was born in New York City. Pepper received a B.A. and M.A. from Columbia University, and studied abroad at the London School of Economics, Ed.D. from the University of Massachusetts Amherst, and J.D. degree from Boston College Law School. He was admitted to the Bar in 1977.

In September 1967, Pepper served as executive director of the National Conference for New Politics, which sought to unite disparate peace and civil rights groups. After feminists Jo Freeman and Shulamith Firestone were publicly denied a chance to speak at the event, Freeman recalled, "Pepper literally patted [Firestone] on the head and said, 'Cool down, little girl. We have more important things to talk about than women’s problems.'” Freeman, Firestone, and Ti-Grace Atkinson all became influential feminist activists in the wake of the conference.

== Prominent cases ==
=== Martin Luther King cases ===
Pepper stated Martin Luther King Jr. contacted him after seeing his photo essay, The Children of Vietnam, which was published in the January 1967 issue of Ramparts magazine. It depicted victims of napalm in Vietnam. Pepper, who supported the Communist cause, later wrote "it was not then clear to Dr. King that Ho-Chi Minh’s reverence for Jefferson, Lincoln, and American democracy, as he idealized it, made him the legitimate father of a unified Vietnam" Pepper later claimed that his conversation with King contributed to King's more adamant position against the Vietnam War, and that he was present at King's Riverside Church speech on April 4, 1967, in which King publicly attacked the war.

James Earl Ray pleaded guilty to King's assassination but soon recanted his confession. Pepper, who was Ray's last attorney, has postulated that Ray was not the shooter but was framed by the FBI, the CIA, the military, the Memphis police, and organized crime figures from New Orleans and Memphis.

Pepper represented James Earl Ray in a televised mock trial where Ray was found not guilty. Pepper's appeals to higher courts, and even the Supreme Court, failed. According to Pepper, "It looked like we were at the end of the road and then I came up with an idea, 'Well, look, why don't we try to have a real trial on television?" A mock trial was broadcast on HBO. The television jury found Ray not guilty.

King's youngest son, Dexter King, met with Ray on March 27, 1997, at the Lois M. DeBerry Special Needs Facility. King subsequently said, "In the name of truth and justice, our family is calling for a trial, a trial James Earl Ray never had. ... I don't think his trial—if he is granted a trial—will necessarily give us the unequivocal proof, but at least in regard to new evidence, we will know more than we do now."

In June 1997, Pepper appeared on ABC's Turning Point. He discussed the theory from his book Orders to Kill: The Truth Behind the Murder of Martin Luther King Jr. This theory that held that a hit team from the 20th special forces group was to kill King if a police sharpshooter failed. This group was supposedly led by a man named Billy Eidson, who Pepper claimed had since been killed in a coverup. Eidson was then brought on camera and refused to shake Pepper's hand. Eidson brought a $15 million lawsuit against Pepper's publisher which was later settled for an undisclosed amount.

Following Ray's death, Pepper represented the King family in a wrongful death lawsuit, "King family vs. Loyd Jowers and other unknown co-conspirators". During a trial that lasted four weeks, Pepper produced over seventy witnesses. Jowers, testifying by deposition, stated that James Earl Ray was a scapegoat and not involved in the assassination. Jowers testified that Memphis police officer Earl Clark fired the fatal shots. On December 8, 1999, the Memphis jury found Jowers responsible, and also found that the assassination plot included "governmental agencies." The jury took less than an hour to find in favor of the King family for the requested sum of $100.

=== Robert F. Kennedy assassination ===
On February 22, 2012, Pepper and co-counsel Laurie Dusek filed a court brief in District Court in Los Angeles claiming that a second gunman fired the shots that killed Robert F. Kennedy, and petitioning for the release of their client Sirhan Sirhan. Pepper believes that Sirhan, who claims to have no memory of the shooting, was programmed under hypnosis to shoot and provide a distraction from the actual gunman who got away. Hypnosis expert Harvard Medical School professor Daniel P. Brown concluded that Sirhan did not act under his own volition and knowledge at the time of the shooting. He was a real "Manchurian Candidate". ABC News said the story had all the makings of a great conspiracy theory.

Sirhan Sirhan was again denied parole on February 10, 2016. On March 30, 2016, the 9th Circuit Court of Appeals denied a further appeal launched by Pepper, noting the appellant has not shown that "jurists of reason would find it debatable whether the petition states a valid claim of the denial of a constitutional right and that jurists of reason would find it debatable whether the district court was correct in its procedural ruling."

== Death ==
Pepper died of pneumonia in New York City on April 7, 2024, at the age of 86.

== Bibliography ==
External videos
- Book TV interview with Pepper on An Act of State: The Execution of Martin Luther King. C-SPAN, January 28, 2003.
- Conversation with Pepper and Len Osanic. November 2008.

=== Articles ===
- "The Children of Vietnam." Ramparts, vol. 5, no. 7 (Jan. 1967), pp. 45–68. Photographs and text by William F. Pepper. Preface by Dr. Benjamin Spock.

=== Books ===
- The Self-Managed Child: Paths to Cultural Rebirth. New York: Harper & Row (1973). ISBN 0060903104.
- Sex Discrimination in Employment: An Analysis and Guide for Practitioner and Student. Charlottesville: Michie Co. (1982). ISBN 978-0872153318.
- Orders to Kill: The Truth Behind the Murder of Martin Luther King, Jr. New York: Carroll & Graf (1995). ISBN 978-0786702534.
- An Act of State: The Execution of Martin Luther King. New York: Verso (2003). ISBN 978-1859846957.
- The Plot to Kill King: The Truth Behind the Assassination of Martin Luther King Jr. New York: Simon & Schuster (2016). ISBN 978-1510702189
