= Tyre Nichols protests =

2023 protests following the death of Tyre Nichols

- Part of the United States racial unrest and the Black Lives Matter movement
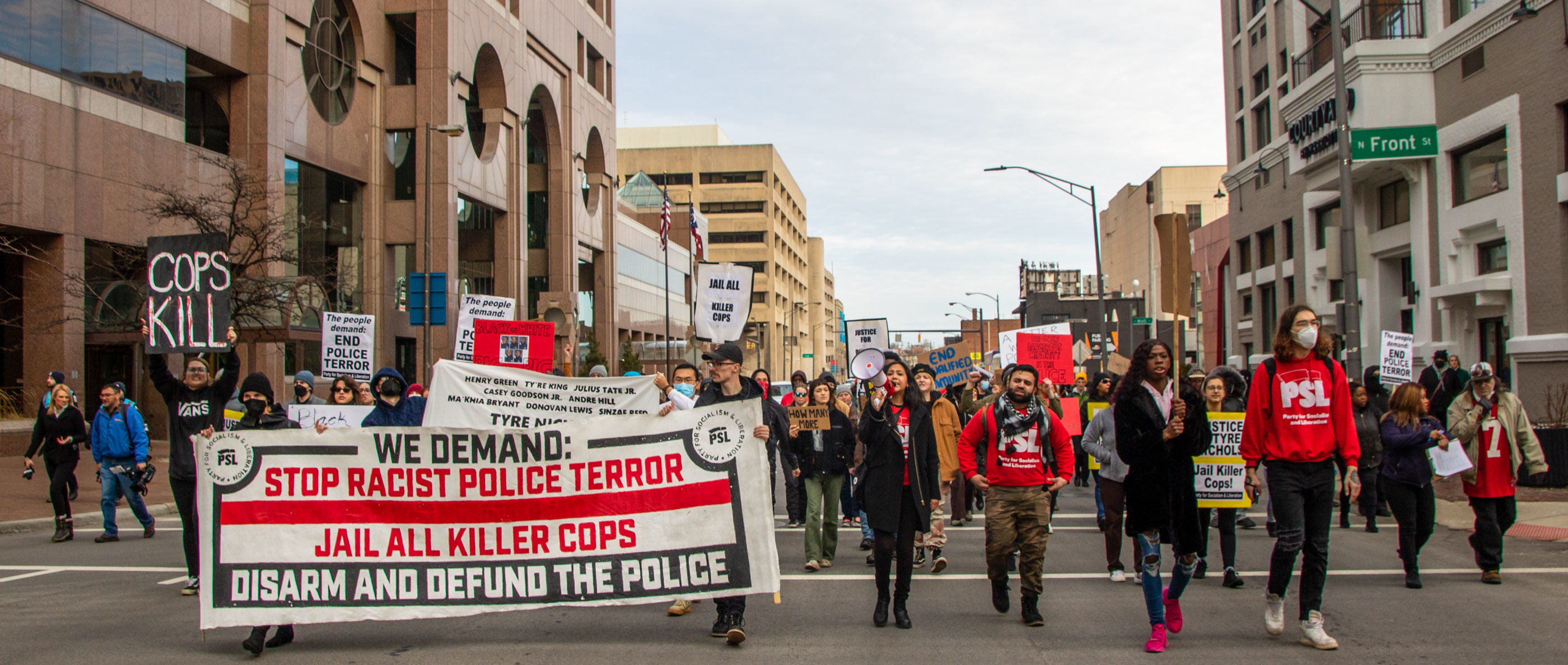
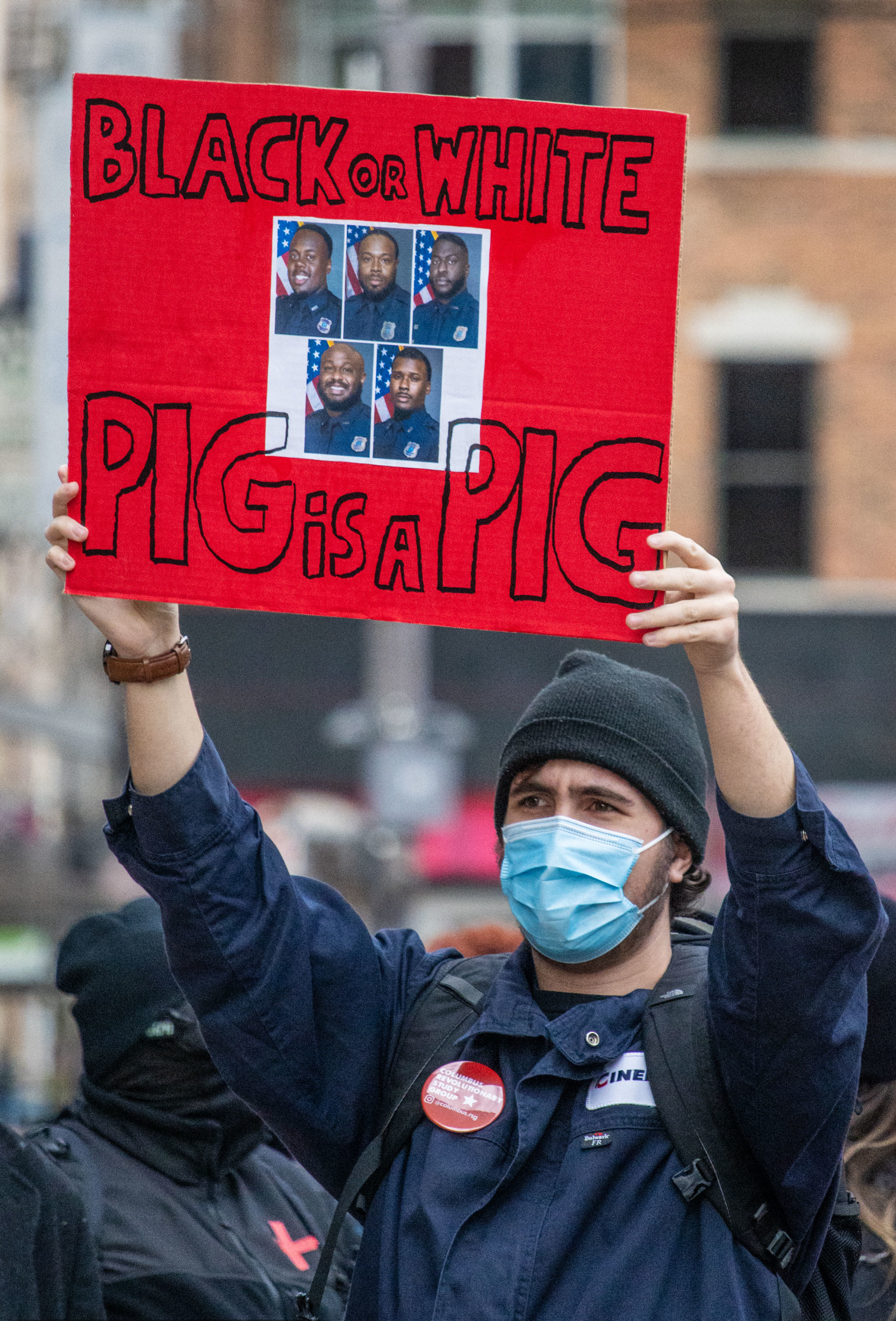
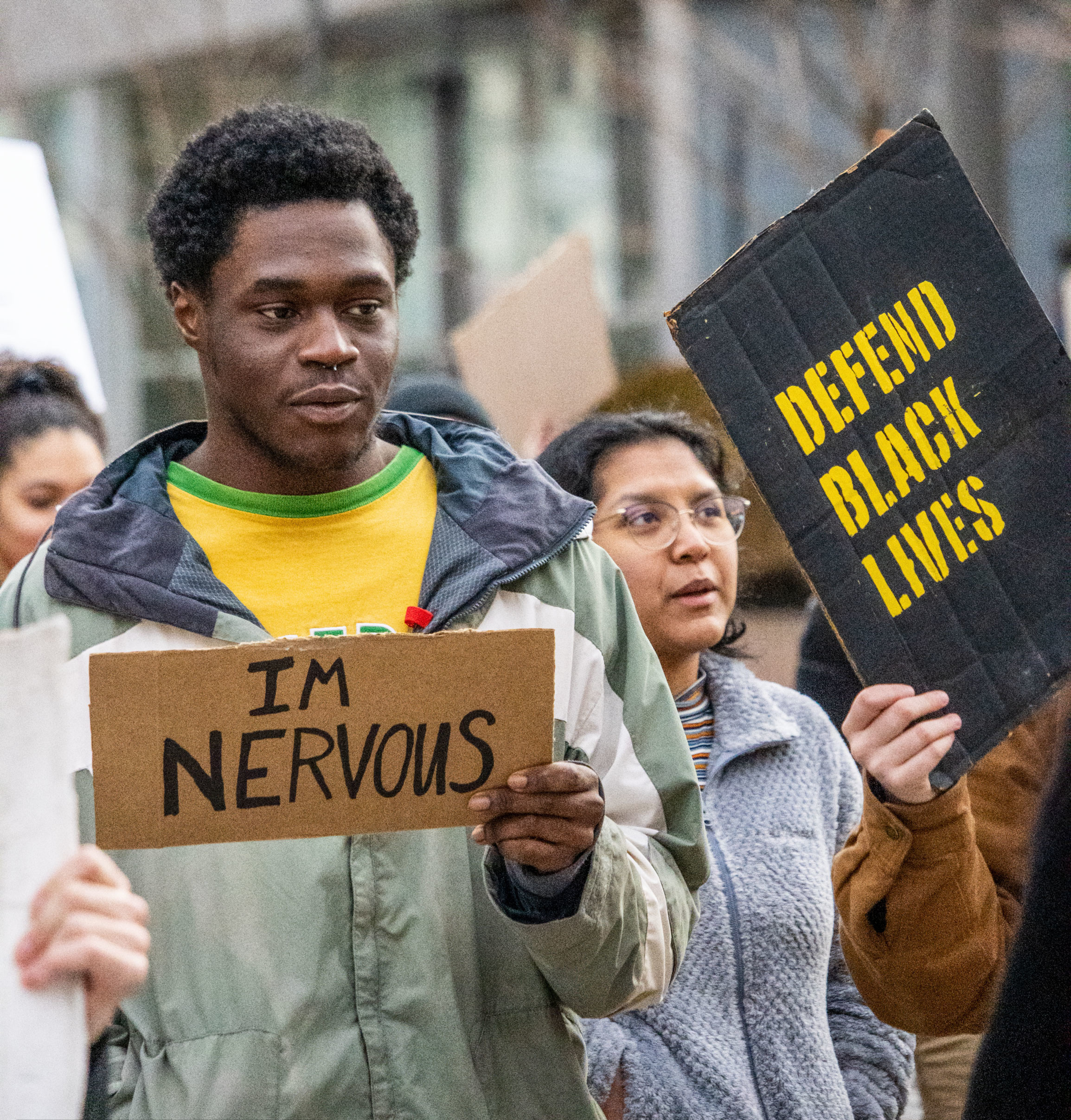
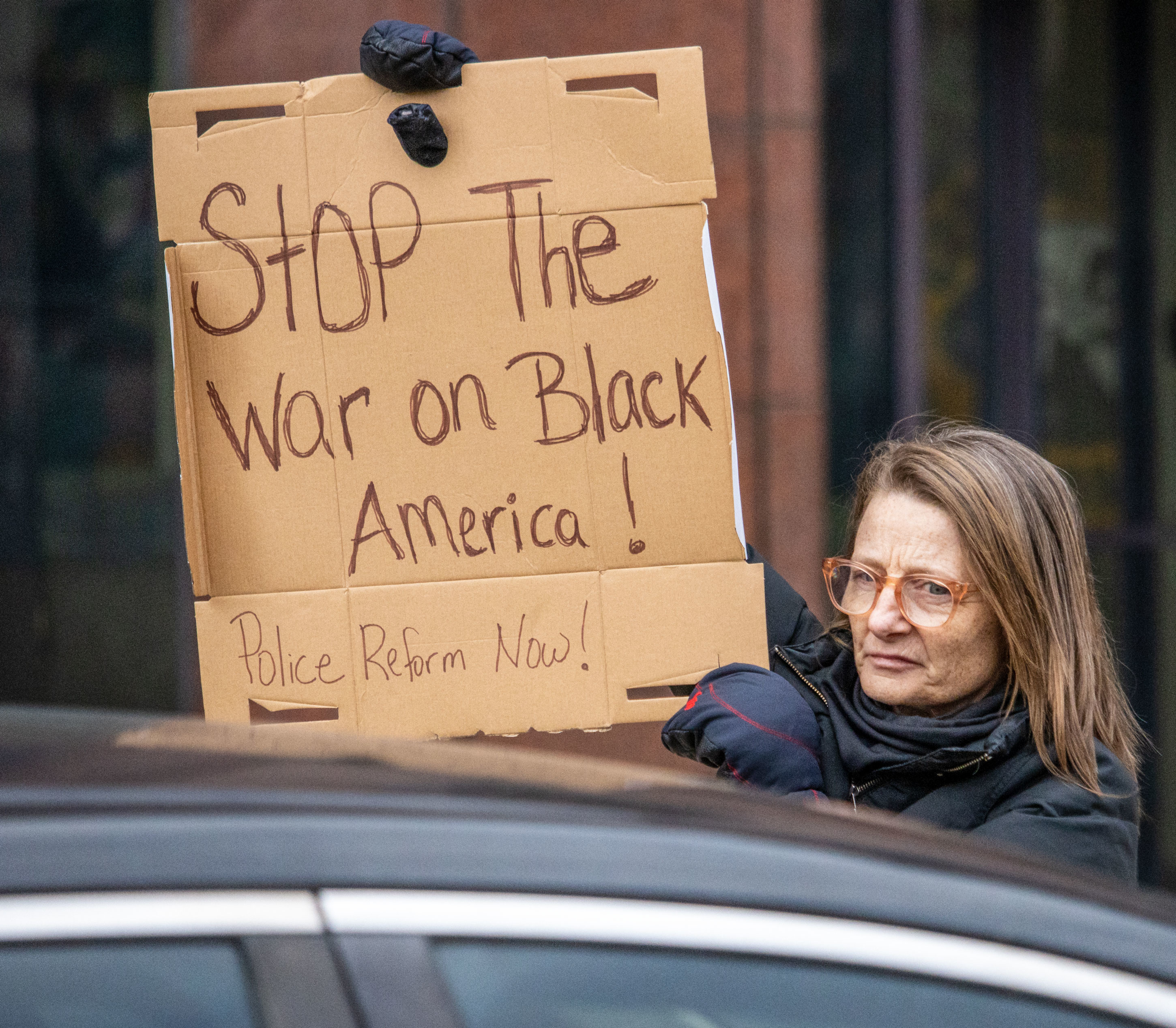
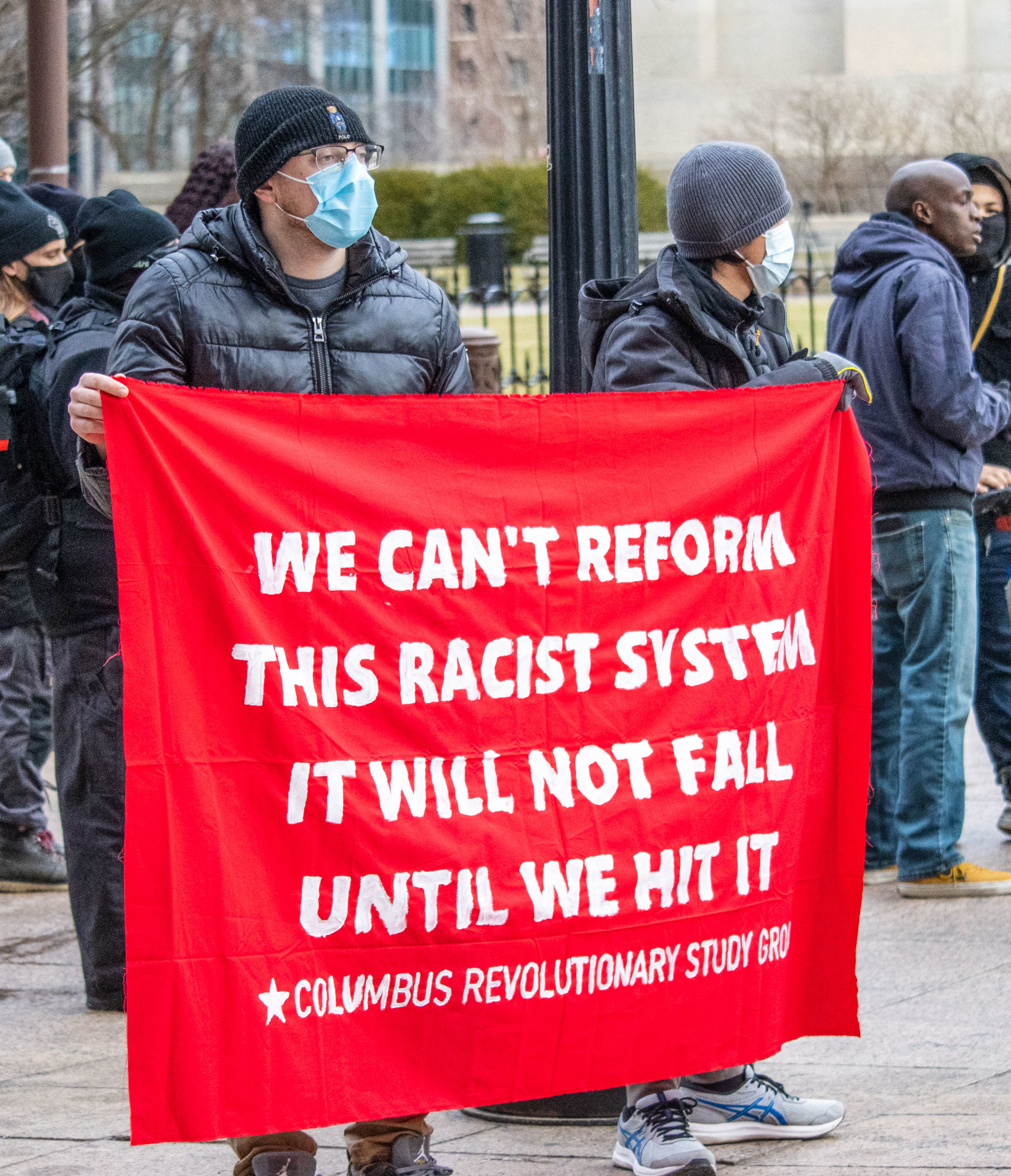
- Date: January 27 – February 1, 2023 (6 days)
- Location: United States
- Caused by: Killing of Tyre Nichols
- Methods: Protests; Demonstrations

Arrests and Injuries
- Arrested: 18

Protests over the killing of Tyre Nichols (/ˈtaɪ.ri ˈnɪk.əlz/ TY-ree) began on January 27, 2023, following the release of police body camera and surveillance footage showing five Black officers from the Memphis Police Department beating Nichols, a 29-year-old Black man. The police assault on Nichols occurred on January 7, 2023, and he died three days later in a hospital. The five officers were subsequently fired and charged with second-degree murder. Protests first emerged in Memphis, Tennessee, and spread to several cities in the United States. Protesters demanded legal accountability for the officers responsible for Nichols death and for the enactment of police-reform measures.

== Background ==
On January 7, 2023, at approximately 8:21 p.m. CDT, five Memphis Police Department (MPD) officers stopped Nichols on suspicion of reckless driving. Nichols ran away from the vehicle after the traffic stop. When officers caught up with Nichols, they beat him for about three minutes, punching and kicking him in the head and striking him on the back with a baton while he was restrained. Three days later, Nichols died. On January 20, the MPD fired the officers involved in the incident. On January 24, preliminary findings from a private autopsy commissioned by Nichols' family found that Nichols died from "suffered extensive bleeding caused by a severe beating". On January 26, the five officers were charged with second-degree murder.

On January 27, the City of Memphis released body camera and surveillance footage of the encounter, showing the officers beating Nichols nine times. Nichols' family and Memphis city leaders prepared for and called for peaceful protests ahead of the video's release.

== Protests ==
=== In Memphis ===
Protests began in Memphis on January 27, upon the release of footage of Nichols' beating. The Memphis chapter of the Black Lives Matter movement initially planned to meet at Martyrs Park; upon realizing that the park was closed, protesters began moving towards the Harahan Bridge along Interstate 55. Protesters began dissipating around 9 p.m. Nichols' family gathered at Tobey Skatepark, a local skatepark in Memphis, to hold a candlelight vigil for Nichols. The following day, the intersection where Nichols was beaten had been turned into a makeshift memorial site.

On January 30, around 30–35 protestors gathered at Shelby Farms Park, where Tyre Nichols would watch the sunset, to protest his death.

=== Elsewhere in the United States ===
Cities in the United States with Tyre Nichols protests.

==== January 27 and 28 ====
In Washington, D.C., seventy-five people gathered in Lafayette Square on January 27, following the release of the footage. Protestors began marching in New York City on the same day. During the protests, a protester jumped on top of a police vehicle and attempted to break its windshield; the protester was taken into custody. The New York Police Department declared that southbound vehicular traffic on Broadway was closed from 48th Street to 42nd Street, as protesters took to Times Square, and demonstrators gathered in Grand Central Terminal. Three protesters were arrested in New York City—one for damage to a police car, a second for striking a police officer, and a third for an undisclosed reason. About a dozen protesters gathered in front of a police station in Chicago. and In Boston, protesters gathered in the Boston Common as a vigil was held at The Embrace. In Los Angeles, a candlelight vigil was held at the headquarters of the Los Angeles Police Department. The vigil quickly escalated as police and protesters clashed. In Columbus, dozens of people gathered outside the Ohio Statehouse in a protest organized by the Party for Socialism and Liberation, which said its branches would initiate and join more protests throughout the weekend.

Protests occurred in other cities, including Asheville, North Carolina; Athens, Georgia; Atlanta; Austin, Texas; Baltimore; Buffalo, New York Charlotte, North Carolina; Columbus, Ohio; Dallas; Denver; Detroit; Hartford, Connecticut; Houston; Manchester, Connecticut; Minneapolis; Newark, New Jersey; Philadelphia; Phoenix, Arizona; Pittsburgh (East Liberty and University of Pittsburgh); Portland, Oregon; Raleigh, North Carolina; Sacramento; Salt Lake City; San Diego; San Francisco; Seattle; St. Louis; and Troy, New York.

==== January 29 ====
On January 29, protesters peacefully gathered in the streets of Manhattan with hundreds rallying at Washington Square Park. Thousands marched in Oakland. Hundreds protested in the Venice neighborhood of Los Angeles where Keenan Anderson recently died after being tasered by police six times. In Saint Paul, 300 people participated in a protest outside the Minnesota Governor's Residence to call for the enactment of police reform measures, such as removing qualified immunity for officers.

Other vigils and protests occurred on Sunday, including in Anchorage, Alaska; Bridgeport, Connecticut; Boise, Idaho; Cambridge, Massachusetts; Davis, California; Elizabeth, New Jersey; Escondido, California; Jacksonville, Florida; Knoxville, Tennessee; Louisville, Kentucky; Madison, Wisconsin; Milwaukee; New Haven, Connecticut; Springfield, Missouri; St. Petersburg, Florida; Stockton, California; Urbana, Illinois; and West Chester, Pennsylvania. A community forum was held in Oklahoma City.

==== January 30 ====
In New Orleans more than 70 protestors gathered at Duncan Plaza and marched towards the city downtown. Local demonstrators who had lost loved ones as a result of U.S. police brutality also participated in the protest. Vigils and protests also took place in Albuquerque, Atlanta, Chicago, California State University, Long Beach, New York City (Queens), Norwalk, Connecticut, Pittsburgh, Providence, at the skatepark Nichols used to skate at in Sacramento, and Yonkers, New York. American University in Washington, D.C. held a virtual teach-in to discuss the incident featuring a panel of legal and public policy experts.

==== February ====
On February 1, the day of Tyre Nichols' funeral, a crowd of about 50 gathered in front of a Wegmans in Johnson City, New York. Protesters chanted "Justice for Tyre" and also protested another recent arrest by the neighboring City of Binghamton Police Department. Multiple people were arrested at the protest and more were pepper-sprayed by the police. Protests also occurred in Fort Myers, Florida and New Ulm, Minnesota. A vigil took place at San Francisco city hall.

On February 4, a vigil for Nichols was held outside the Metro Courthouse in Nashville, Tennessee. The vigil, organized by the Black Nashville Assembly, honored Nichols, as well as Eric Allen, who was shot by a Mount Juliet officer in November 2022.

On February 13, students marched from Tennessee State University to Fisk University, both historically black universities in Nashville, chanting Tyre Nichols name.

== Government response ==
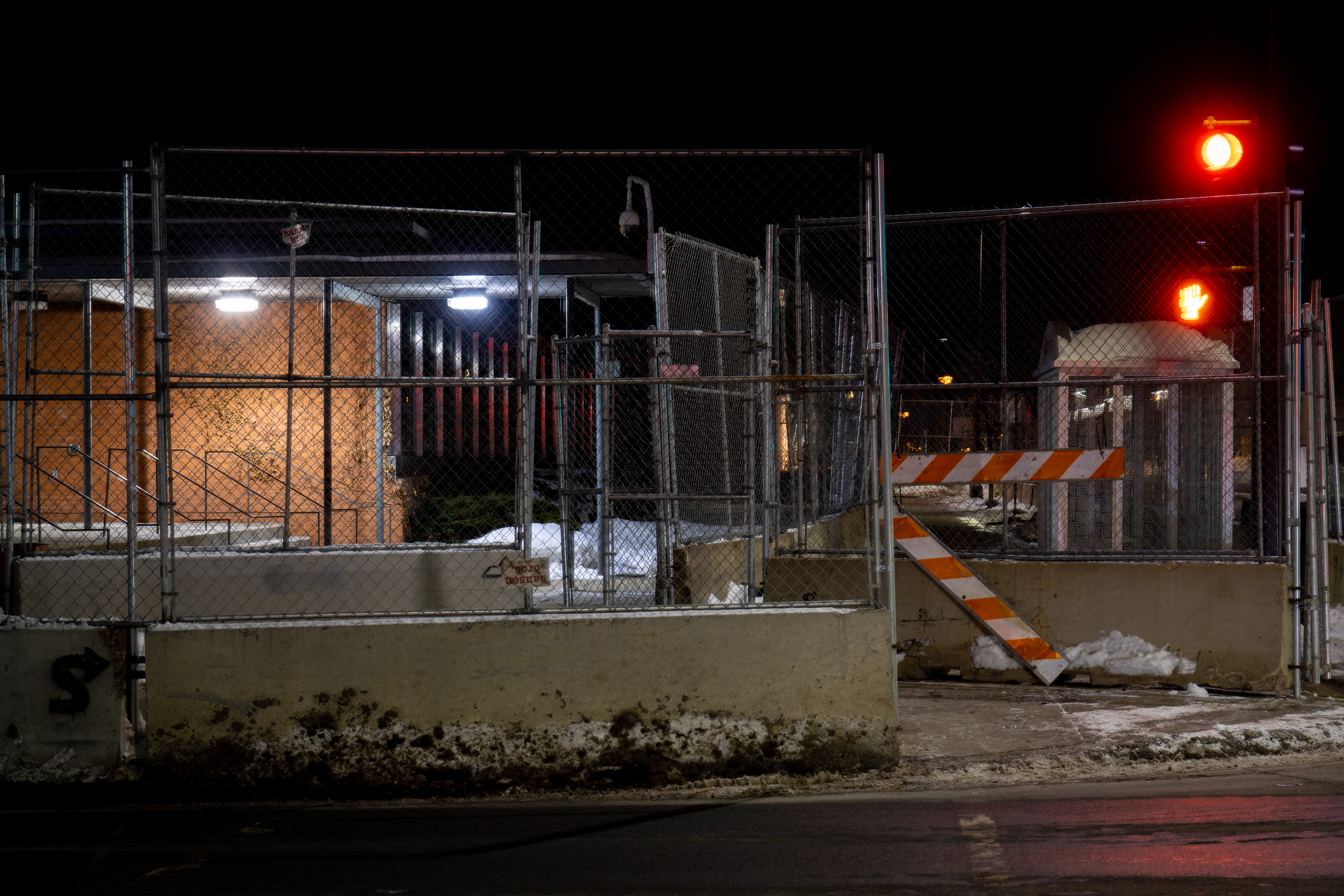
Fencing erected at the Minneapolis police fifth precinct shortly after the release of the footage showcasing Nichols' beating

Georgia governor Brian Kemp declared a state of emergency, allowing up to 1,000 National Guard troops to be deployed until February 9, in part due to the state's own recent unrest over the Stop Cop City occupied protest and death of Manuel Esteban Paez Terán. The Metropolitan Police Department of Washington, D.C. activated "all sworn personnel".

The Biden administration spoke with the mayors of multiple cities, including Philadelphia, Los Angeles, and Chicago, offering assistance in the event of protests.

Ahead of the January 27 video release, the ATF sent out a precautionary alert to law enforcement agencies in the Minneapolis–Saint Paul metropolitan area to monitor for potential unrest and officials for the cities of Minneapolis and Saint Paul revealed they were preparing contingency plans.

Governor Sarah Huckabee Sanders authorized the Arkansas National Guard to reinforce police in the West Memphis area on January 28 "out of an abundance of caution." The Arkansas Highway Patrol closed the eastbound lanes of the I-40 Mississippi bridge leading into Memphis, Tennessee because of the protests.

On February 3, 2023, sixth police officer involved in Tyre Nichols’ death investigation, Preston Hemphill was fired from Memphis' police force. Internal investigation was held, which showed Hemphill had violated multiple department policies as well as stun gun deployment rule. Five officers were already charged with Nichols’ death and fired.

== See also ==
- 1992 Los Angeles riots
- George Floyd protests
- List of incidents and protests of the 2020–2023 United States racial unrest
- List of killings by law enforcement officers in the United States, January 2023
