= Memphis Safe Task Force =

Federal–state law enforcement operation in Memphis, Tennessee

- Part of the domestic military deployments by the second Trump administration
- Photographs of the Memphis Safe Task Force: Top: Immigration and Customs Enforcement (ICE) officers carrying out a raid during the Memphis Safe Task Force, 2026; Bottom: Civic action during a night raid in Memphis, October 2026
- Date: September 29, 2025 – present (Established by presidential memorandum on September 15, 2025)
- Location: Memphis, Tennessee and Shelby County
- Organized by: Second Trump administration; Donald Trump (signed the memorandum); Pam Bondi (appoints the chair); Gadyaces S. Serralta (Chair, Director of the U.S. Marshals Service); Frankie Sanchez (Commander); Bill Lee (Governor of Tennessee)
- Participants: United States Marshals Service (lead); Federal Bureau of Investigation; Drug Enforcement Administration; Bureau of Alcohol, Tobacco, Firearms and Explosives; Immigration and Customs Enforcement; Homeland Security Investigations; Tennessee National Guard; Tennessee Highway Patrol; Tennessee Bureau of Investigation; Memphis Police Department; Shelby County Sheriff's Office
- Arrests: >10,017 people arrested as of June 9, 2026

Memorandum on Restoring Law and Order in Memphis which Donald Trump signed on September 15, 2025.

The Memphis Safe Task Force (MSTF) is a multi-agency law enforcement operation in Memphis, Tennessee, created by a presidential memorandum that Donald Trump signed on September 15, 2025. The memorandum said the city was suffering from violent crime beyond local officials' ability to respond, citing FBI data that Memphis had the highest violent crime rate per capita in the country in 2024. Led by the United States Marshals Service, it includes federal agencies such as the FBI, the Drug Enforcement Administration and Homeland Security Investigations, with the Tennessee Highway Patrol, local police and the Tennessee National Guard. Operations began on September 29, 2025.

Crime in Memphis was already declining before the task force arrived. On September 9, 2025, the Memphis Police Department reported that crime had dropped to a 25-year low across major categories, and Mayor Paul said crime was down 27% from its 2023 peak. Federal and state officials credit the task force with further declines; city data showed crime down 37% after its first year, with the rate leveling off since. The task force reported more than 13,000 arrests in that year, including 845 immigration arrests, and critics have pointed to deaths during its operations.

== Background ==
On September 12, 2025, Trump announced that he would send National Guard troops to Memphis, saying that "Memphis is deeply troubled." Three days earlier, the Memphis Police Department had reported that crime in the city had dropped to a 25-year low across major categories. The September 15 memorandum directed the Secretary of Defense to request that the Governor of Tennessee deploy the Tennessee National Guard to Memphis, and ordered the creation of a federal law enforcement task force to work alongside it.

Memphis mayor Paul Young and members of the Memphis City Council spoke against the deployment, and Shelby County mayor Lee Harris opposed it more firmly. Governor Lee supported the operation.

== Operations ==
The task force made nine arrests on its first day. On October 1, 2025, Attorney General Pam Bondi, Secretary of Defense Pete Hegseth and White House Deputy Chief of Staff Stephen Miller visited Memphis and addressed task force officers. Miller told them they were "unleashed" and said, "We are going to bulldoze the criminal elements in this city." National Guard patrols began on October 10, 2025.

ABC24 counted 13 participating agencies; ProPublica described more than two dozen federal, state and local agencies. City Journal reported more than 2,600 personnel from 33 agencies working in 42 teams across the city's nine police precincts. The Tennessee Highway Patrol leads its traffic enforcement. Tyreece Miller, the U.S. Marshal for the Western District of Tennessee, oversees the operation locally; its commander is Frankie Sanchez.

In October 2025, Governor Lee announced a $100 million Downtown Public Safety Grant Fund for the Memphis area to support the task force, part of $175 million in state public safety grants. Trump visited Memphis on March 23, 2026, and spoke about the task force.

=== Arrests ===
According to figures released on September 24, 2026, the task force had made 13,020 arrests, including 1,443 people it identified as gang members and 845 immigration-related arrests, an average of about 36 arrests a day. Earlier releases reported 131 homicide arrests, 1,363 narcotics arrests and 1,276 firearms arrests. By late February 2026, about 200 juveniles had been arrested.

An analysis by MLK50 and ProPublica of daily arrest reports from October 2025 to early February 2026 found that just over a quarter of more than 5,200 arrests were for violent crimes; most of the rest stemmed from outstanding warrants.

=== Use of force and deaths ===
As of July 2026, the Tennessee Bureau of Investigation (TBI) was investigating eight use-of-force incidents involving task force members. Four were fatal shootings, and one of the others involved a person being run over. All four men killed were Black. Of the 18 fatal shootings by officers in Tennessee in 2026 at that point, four involved the task force, and the Tennessee Lookout reported that its use-of-force incidents exceeded those of any other state or local law enforcement agency in Tennessee.

=== Immigration enforcement ===
Immigration and Customs Enforcement (ICE) and Homeland Security Investigations take part in the task force. The MLK50 and ProPublica analysis found that the task force arrested more than 800 people deemed to be in the country unlawfully in its first four months. Seventeen of them, about 2%, were also arrested for violent crimes. About 82% of the immigration arrests followed a traffic stop, usually initiated by the Tennessee Highway Patrol for minor violations such as a broken taillight or window tint. Most took place in the Parkway Village neighborhood. A White House spokesperson responded that "every local leader should want to mimic this success." According to NPR, immigration arrests in the Memphis area rose sixfold in the task force's first months, and an analysis by the Institute for Public Service Reporting found that most people arrested had no criminal convictions. On August 30, 2026, a raid on the El Corralón bar detained about 100 people.

=== Legal challenges ===
Seven state and local Democratic officials sued Governor Lee over the National Guard deployment, and on November 17, 2025, a Davidson County chancellor blocked it, pausing her order for an appeal. On April 28, 2026, the Tennessee Court of Appeals reversed, ruling that the officials lacked standing without deciding whether the deployment was lawful. On May 13, 2026, four residents represented by the American Civil Liberties Union sued in federal court, alleging that task force agents retaliated against them for filming operations and misapplied the state's "Halo Law," which bars approaching within 25 feet of an officer after a warning.

== Crime statistics ==
In January 2026, Trump claimed a 77% reduction in crime; the City of Memphis reported a 44% reduction for the fourth quarter of 2025, and Mayor Young noted that crime had already fallen about 25% before the task force began. At the one-year mark, local data showed a 37% drop in serious crime and a 16% drop in calls for service compared with the period before the task force, but the rate had plateaued after the initial decline. Murders were fell 37% after the deployment according to the U.S. Marshals office. Before the task force arrived, crime overall had already dropped 27% from its 2023 peak.

== First anniversary ==
On October 16, 2026, Attorney General Todd Blanche hosted a roundtable in Memphis with Senator Marsha Blackburn, U.S. Marshals Service Director Gadyaces S. Serralta and Memphis police chief C. J. Davis to mark the task force's first anniversary. Blanche said the task force would stay in Memphis with no end date and would keep receiving personnel and funding. He said it had made more than 13,500 arrests, including more than 1,500 people it identified as gang members, and Serralta said it had located 196 missing and endangered children. Blanche said overall crime in Memphis was at a 25-year low and credited the task force with reductions in violent crime, robberies and vehicle thefts. The Tennessee Lookout noted that crime had begun falling before the task force arrived. Blanche also said the model could be replicated elsewhere, naming Chicago.

Blackburn, the Republican nominee for governor, praised the task force at the event. Her Democratic opponent, Memphis City Councilmember Jerri Green, has called it federal overreach. Immigrant advocate Maria Oceja of Vecindarios 901 said the emphasis on nonviolent offenses and traffic stops was not a strategy to reduce crime, but to disenfranchise more Black voters.

== See also ==
- Domestic military deployments by the second Trump administration
- Operation Midway Blitz
- Crime in Memphis, Tennessee
- Kavanaugh stop
