= Speeches of Joe Biden =

Speeches of President of the United States

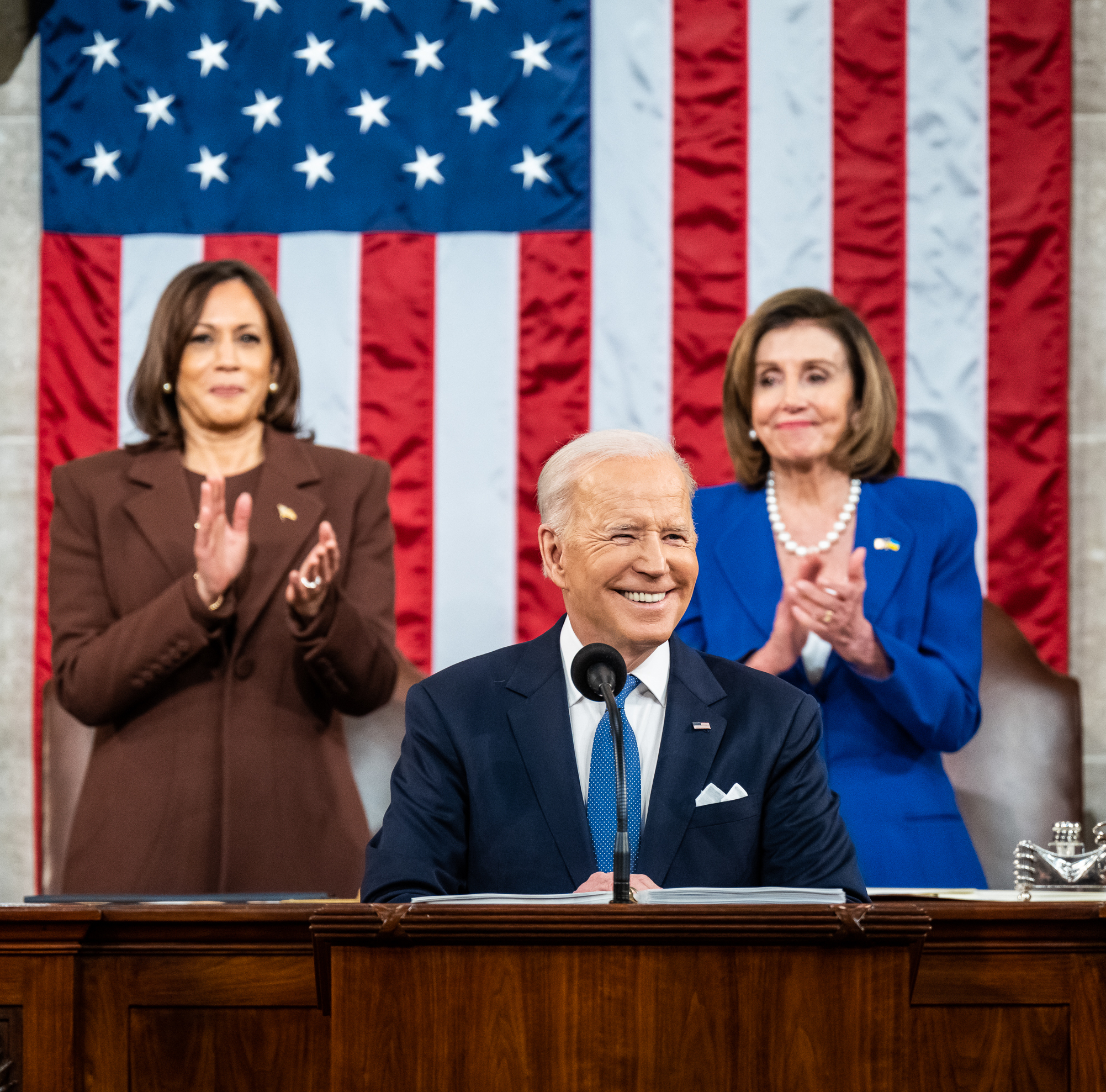
Joe Biden delivering the 2022 State of the Union Address to Congress

Joe Biden served as the 46th president of the United States from 2021 to 2025. Before his presidency, he served in the United States Senate (1973–2009) and was the 47th vice president of the United States (2009–2017).

== 2020-2021 speeches ==
- Joe Biden 2020 presidential campaign#Election Day and beyond (Delivered on November 7, 2020)
- Inauguration of Joe Biden#Inaugural address (Delivered on January 20, 2021)
- 2021 Joe Biden speech to a joint session of Congress (Delivered on April 28, 2021)
- General debate of the seventy-sixth session of the United Nations General Assembly#21 September (Delivered on September 21, 2021)

== 2022-2023 speeches ==
- 2022 State of the Union Address (Delivered on March 1, 2022)
- 2022 Joe Biden speech in Warsaw (Delivered on March 26, 2022)
- Battle for the Soul of the Nation speech (Delivered on September 1, 2022)
- General debate of the seventy-seventh session of the United Nations General Assembly#21 September (Delivered on September 21, 2022)
- 2023 State of the Union Address (Delivered on February 7, 2023)

== 2024-2025 speeches ==
- General debate of the seventy-eighth session of the United Nations General Assembly#19 September (Delivered on September 19, 2023)
- 2024 State of the Union Address (Delivered on March 7, 2024)
- Joe Biden 2024 presidential campaign#Withdrawal (Delivered on July 21, 2024)
- General debate of the seventy-ninth session of the United Nations General Assembly#Tuesday, 24 September (Delivered on September 24, 2024)
- Joe Biden's farewell address (Delivered on January 15, 2025)
