= RowVaughn Wells =

U.S. activist

- Born: c. 1962 (age 63–64); Oakland, California, U.S.
- Known for: Social justice activism
- Children: 4; including Tyre Nichols

RowVaughn Wells (born c. 1962) is an American social justice activist and the mother of Tyre Nichols, a man killed by Memphis police officers in January 2023. An advocate for the prevention of police brutality in the United States, Wells influenced the Biden administration in its pursuit of police reform.

== Life ==
Wells was born c. 1962 and is from Oakland, California. She is the mother of Tyre Nichols who was killed by Memphis police officers in January 2023. In the aftermath, she has advocated for the prevention of police brutality in the United States. Wells was a major influence on the Biden administration to pursue police reform as a result of police brutality in the United States. She praised Memphis police chief, Cerelyn J. Davis for her quick response.

In February 2023, Wells and her husband, Rodney Wells visited the White House before attending the State of the Union Address at the invitation of the Congressional Black Caucus. They received a standing ovation from members of Congress. Wells joined reverend Al Sharpton to speak out about the death of her son at the House of Justice in Harlem in March 2023. In April 2023, she was named to the Time 100 list of the most influential people in the world for her strength and response to her son's death.

In April 2023, Wells' lawyer, Benjamin Crump filed a federal suit against the Memphis Police Department.

Wells is married to Ron Wells. She has three children in addition to Nichols.
