= Selden Ring Award =

The Selden Ring Award for Investigative Reporting, given by the Annenberg School for Communication and Journalism at the University of Southern California is a journalism award that includes $50,000 cash in recognition of investigative reporting that has had an impact and caused change.

== Winners ==
2020 - MLK50

2021 - Associated Press

2022 - ProPublica

2023 - Reuters
