= 2023 State of the Union Address =

Speech by US President Joe Biden

- Full video of the speech as published by the White House
- Date: February 7, 2023
- Time: 9:00 p.m. (EST)
- Duration: 1 hour, 13 minutes
- Venue: House Chamber, United States Capitol
- Location: Washington, D.C.; 38°53′19.8″N 77°00′32.8″W
- Type: State of the Union Address
- Participants: Joe Biden; Kamala Harris; Kevin McCarthy
- Footage: C-SPAN
- Previous: 2022 State of the Union Address
- Next: 2024 State of the Union Address
- Website: Full text by Archives.gov

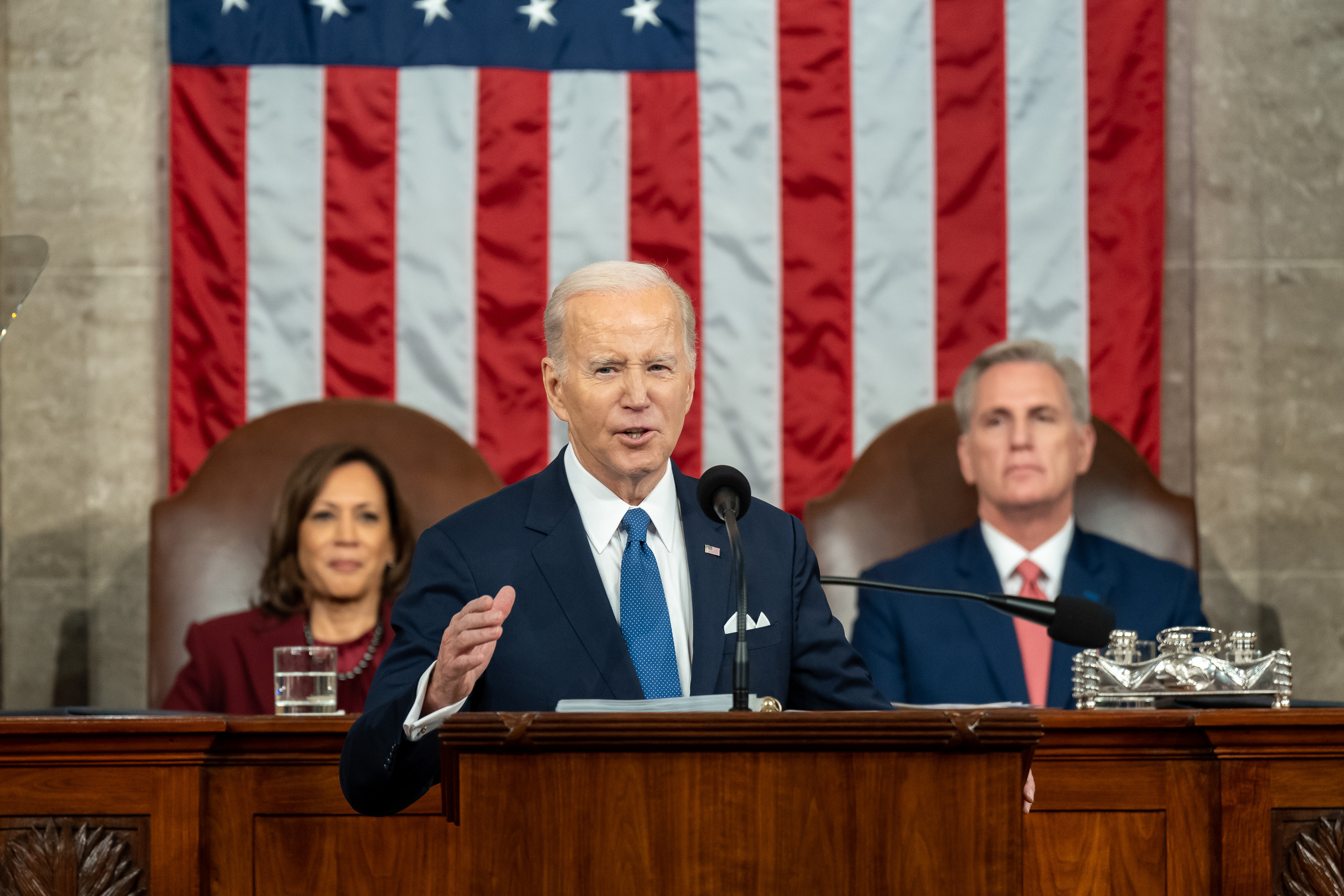
President Biden delivering the State of the Union address to the U.S. Congress

Joe Biden, the 46th president of the United States, delivered a State of the Union address on February 7, 2023, at 9:00 p.m. EST, in the chamber of the House of Representatives to the 118th Congress. The televised address was viewed by 27.3 million people across the networks that broadcast it. (Note: These numbers do not include other options for later viewing.)

It was Biden's second State of the Union and his third speech to a joint session of the United States Congress. Presiding over this joint session was the House Speaker, Kevin McCarthy, accompanied by Kamala Harris, the vice president, in her capacity as the president of the Senate.

It was the first address to a Republican-controlled House of Representatives since 2018.

== Proceedings ==
Article II, Section 3, Clause 1, of the United States Constitution states that the president "shall from time to time give to the Congress Information of the State of the Union, and recommend to their Consideration such measures as he shall judge necessary and expedient." On January 13, 2023, President Biden accepted Speaker McCarthy's invitation to deliver a State of the Union Address on February 7.

Marty Walsh, the then-United States Secretary of Labor, was the designated survivor for 2023's speech.

=== Issues mentioned ===
- His administration's competition agenda, advocating for a ban on "junk fees" and non-compete clauses. Biden called on Congress to enact antitrust laws to rein in Big Tech.
- The creation of 12 million new jobs and the unemployment rate. Other talking points mentioned include domestic semiconductor manufacturing, inflation, infrastructure, gun violence, and the Russian invasion of Ukraine.
- The debt-ceiling crisis and highlighted some Republican-backed proposals to cut Social Security and Medicare. After Republicans in the audience booed, Biden retorted, "as we all apparently agree, Social Security and Medicare is off the books now, right? They're not to be touched."
- A base record of unemployment during his tenure; declining inflation rate, caused by high price of energy over 18 past months; and trying to improve the industrial base of the country through discussions on legislative accomplishments.

=== Disruptions ===
Several members in the audience interrupted Biden; Representative Andy Ogles yelled "it's your fault!" when Biden acknowledged fentanyl overdose deaths, and Representatives Bob Good and Marjorie Taylor Greene shouted "liar!" during Biden's comments about Republicans cutting Social Security and Medicare. Greene stayed seated when Biden introduced the Ukrainian ambassador to the United States Oksana Markarova and the family of Tyre Nichols.

== Responses ==
=== Republican ===
Governor Sarah Huckabee Sanders of Arkansas gave the Republican response to the president's address. In her speech, Sanders criticized Biden's for allegedly prioritizing "woke fantasies" over the livelihoods of Americans. Sanders also stated that "we are under attack in a left-wing culture war we didn't start and never wanted to fight".

Representative Juan Ciscomani delivered the Republican response in Spanish.

=== Working Families Party ===
Representative Delia Ramirez (IL-03) delivered the Working Families Party response. In her speech, Ramirez praised the Biden administration's record while calling for action to revive the expanded child tax credit, enact a $15 minimum wage, and expand Medicaid.

== Viewership ==
This State of the Union address drew 27.3 million viewers, a 29% drop from 2022 and the lowest State of the Union audience in 30 years. According to Nielsen, 73% of the people who watched Biden's speech were over the age of 55, while only 5% were under age 35.
CNN and MSNBC are the only networks to deliver lower viewership for the 2023 speech than for the 2021 speech.

| Network | Viewers |
|---|---|
| FNC | 4,695,000 |
| ABC | 4,405,000 |
| NBC | 3,778,000 |
| CBS | 3,637,000 |
| MSNBC | 3,569,000 |
| CNN | 2,411,000 |
| Fox | 1,656,000 |
| Univision | 1,083,000 |
| Telemundo | 836,000 |
| Newsmax | 252,000 |
| CNBC | 128,000 |
| NewsNation | 97,000 |
| Fox Business | 64,000 |
| CNN en Español | 18,000 |

Broadcast networks Cable news networks

== Invited persons ==
=== Officers or veterans ===
- Jeffrey T. Smith: Montgomery County Sheriff of Fort Plain, New York, who has served since being elected in 2018. He has been an officer for 34 years and was undersheriff for 12 of those years.
- Michael Weinstock: A former firefighter who served during the September 11 attacks and has a neurological condition as a result. His attendance drew media attention as he was the guest of New York Rep. George Santos, who has made numerous false or dubious claims about his biography and work history, including a claim that his mother had died prematurely due to health effects of the attacks. Weinstock hoped to draw attention 9/11-related health issues; he was fired from his law firm before attending due to the Santos connection.
- Jordan Zaitz: An officer of the Portland (Oregon) Police Bureau who has been working for 19 years and is currently fighting the city's growing homeless and drug problem.
- Richard M. Fierro: Army veteran who disarmed the shooter with two other people at the Club Q shooting on the Transgender Day of Remembrance in 2022. His daughter's boyfriend, Raymond Vance, died during the attack.
- Andrea Neutzling: An Army veteran from Syracuse, Ohio, who is suffering from multiple lung diseases due to exposure from burn pits during her service in Iraq and helped get the PACT Act passed.
- Laura Villicana: Las Vegas Metropolitan Police Department (LVMPD) officer who has been helping build bridges with East Las Vegas's Latino community.

=== Politicians ===
- Henry Lo: Former mayor of Monterey Park, California, and current councilman of the city who was mayor during the Lunar New Year's Eve shooting in his city.
- Governor Wes Moore: Democrat and Maryland's first Black governor in the state's 246-year history, and the third African-American elected governor in the history of the United States.
- Roya Rahmani: Afghanistan's first female ambassador to the United States who served from December 2018 until July 2021, one month before the complete withdrawal of American troops from her country and the subsequent fall of her country to the Taliban, which resulted in a rollback of women's rights in the country.
- Governor Maura Healey: Democratic Governor of Massachusetts who has been serving since elected in 2022 and is the first elected female governor of Massachusetts as well as the first elected openly LGBT official in the state.

=== CEOs, founders, or presidents of organizations or companies ===
- Jennifer Gray Thompson: CEO of After the Fire USA, a wildfire recovery organization based in Sonoma, California, which primarily assists across areas of the Western United States hit by large wildfires.
- Andrew Cortés: Founder of Building Futures, a pre-apprenticeship training program for construction jobs in Providence, Rhode Island, that works with the Rhode Island Department of Transportation and the Rhode Island Turnpike and Bridge Authority (RITBA) on infrastructure in the state.
- Raya Kenney: CEO and founder of The National Memorial to the Women Who Worked on the Home Front Foundation who inspired Congresswoman Eleanor Holmes Norton to write a bill establishing a memorial honoring the women who worked on the home front during World War II in Washington, D.C., which was subsequently signed by Joe Biden in December 2022.
- Allison O’Toole: CEO of the Second Harvest Heartland charity in Brooklyn Park, Minnesota, which has been feeding families from Minnesota and western Wisconsin in need during the COVID-19 pandemic.
- James Gibbs: International Vice President of United Mine Workers of America, one of the largest unions in the United States who is trying to get funding for black lung benefits for coal miners with pneumoconiosis, which is often called "black lung disease".
- Jacki Liszak: President and CEO of the Fort Myers Beach Chamber of Commerce, elected Fire Commissioner for the Fort Myers Beach Fire Control District, and owner and operator of several small businesses in the area with her husband. Her city was devastated by Hurricane Ian in 2022, and she met with Biden to survey the damage after the storm had passed.
- Adrien Bennings: President of Portland Community College since 2022, and its first permanent female president.
- Liz Shuler: President of the AFL–CIO since 2021.

=== Private or miscellaneous people ===
- Brandon Tsay: A computer programmer from San Marino, California, who disarmed the shooter at his family's Lai Lai Ballroom in Alhambra, California, during a Lunar New Year's Eve celebration on January 21.
- RowVaughn and Rodney Wells: mother and stepfather of Tyre Nichols, a Black driver who was beaten to death by five Black Memphis Police Department (MPD) officers during a traffic stop on January 7.
- Darrell Woodie: A good samaritan and part-time Amazon driver who helped Republican Florida representative Greg Steube by calling for 9-1-1 after he fell down 25 feet while cutting tree limbs in his property in Sarasota on January 18.
- Kelley O'Hara: United States women's national soccer team (USWNT) player, world and Olympic champion, and host of The Players' Pod podcast on Just Women's Sports who successfully helped negotiate equal pay for both the men's and women's national soccer teams in 2022.
- Michael Isaacson: Executive Director of the Kane County Health Department who worked for more than 22 years, including the duration of COVID-19 pandemic in Illinois.
- Sara Harvey: A sixth grader from Lower Southampton, Pennsylvania, who raised more than $20,000 since she was diagnosed with retinoblastoma, an eye cancer, at age 4. She will be accompanied by her parents Steve and Toni, as well as her younger brother Sonny.
- Joe Cramer: A dry-bean farmer from Frankenmuth, Michigan, who previously worked for the Michigan Bean Commission as well as vice president of Star of the West Milling Co.
- Pamela Walker: mother of Jayland Walker, a 25 year old Black man who was shot and killed by Akron Police Department officers with 46 bullets following a police chase on June 27, 2022.
- Dr. James Baker: A doctor from Lowell, Massachusetts, who has been helping patients fight the opioid crisis and advocates for new laws regarding safe opioid prescriptions since he lost his son Max to opioid addiction in 2016.
- Delegate Carl W. Jackson: Delegate from Baltimore County, Maryland, who has served since 2019.
- Michael Brown Sr.: The father of 18 year old Michael Brown, a Black teen who was controversially shot and killed by a White Ferguson Police Department officer named Darren Wilson in 2014 after he was accused of robbing a convenience store.
- Sterling Brown: A basketball player in the NBA who was tackled and tased by Milwaukee Police Department officers due to an escalated encounter stemming from his car straddling two handicapped parking spaces at a Walgreens while he was on the Milwaukee Bucks in 2018.
- Kate Dineen: An abortion rights activist from Boston who had to travel 500 miles from her home city to Bethesda, Maryland, to get an abortion after her son suffered a stroke in utero and she had a 50% chance of dying because she couldn't receive one at Massachusetts General Hospital due to new state laws passed after the overturning of Roe v. Wade that banned abortions after 24 weeks (6 months) in 2022.
- Ellen Mahoney: Widow of 61-year-old Kevin Mahoney, who was killed at the King Soopers shooting in Boulder, Colorado, in 2021.
- Chris DeShields: A SEPTA bus driver from Philadelphia who stopped a carjacking by using his 40-foot (12 m) bus to block and scare the perpetrator on January 25.
- Amanda Barbosa: Wife of a former Army helicopter pilot who has stage four colon cancer due to being exposed to toxic substances during her service. She has been advocating for better care of veterans and military personnel who were also exposed to toxic substances and worked with senator Amy Klobuchar pass the PACT Act.
- Tony Sanneh: Founder of the Sanneh Foundation, an organization in Saint Paul, Minnesota, that aims to improve the lives of the youth in the Twin Cities by providing in-school and after-school support, programs that strengthen physical health and social and emotional development, and uniting the many diverse communities in the area.
- Andre Locke: Father of Amir Locke, a 22 year old Black man who was killed in his apartment by Minneapolis Police Department officers looking for his cousin during a no-knock search warrant raid for a homicide investigation.
- Dawanna Witt: Current Hennepin County Sheriff who has been working for 23 years and is the first Black and female elected sheriff the county's history.
- Eugénie Ouedraogo: A nursing student at UMass Dartmouth and immigrant from Burkina Faso who came to the country in 2017, was naturalized alongside her husband Alain in 2022, and is currently living in Taunton, Massachusetts. Her children were supported by Triumph Inc., a local child care program, while she was pursuing her studies.
- Jane Doe from Ohio: An anonymous woman who lost her son to the ongoing fentanyl epidemic, which is believed to have been amplified by continuous drug flow from the Southern border.
- Regina Wallace Jones: CEO of ActBlue, a technology organization that has been involved in fundraising for the Democrats and their causes like police reform and abortion rights.
- Jaqueline Sanches: A teacher from Boston, who immigrated from Cape Verde in 2007 who has been struggling in the current child-care crisis.
- Savion Pollard: A former Navy engineer who was the first hire by Micron for their new computer chip factory in Clay, New York, following the passage of the CHIPS Act.
- Vi Lyles: Mayor of Charlotte, North Carolina, who has been serving since 2017 and has been trying to close inequalities in the city.
- Kelsey Leigh: An abortion patient advocate from the Lehigh Valley in Pennsylvania who had an abortion 22 weeks of pregnancy after severe fetal anomalies were discovered and protested the state's 20-week abortion ban at the Pennsylvania State Capitol in Harrisburg.
- Chris Barrett: CEO of the Pocono Mountains Visitors Bureau who has been trying to get Amtrak passenger rail service between New York City and Scranton restored to help boost tourism in Northeastern Pennsylvania.
- David Golt: Miami Shores Police Chief who has been fighting the fentanyl epidemic and pushing for more laws regarding the drug since he lost his son Zachary to fentanyl in 2021.
- Trent Dirks: A Waverly, Iowa, veteran who works for Retrieving Freedom, a facility that trains service dogs to help treat veterans with mental health effects such as depression, anxiety, panic attacks, PTSD, and nightmares, as well as children with autism.
- David Hovde: A man from Appleton, Wisconsin, who receives insulin for his diabetes through Medicare and has been saving due to the Inflation Reduction Act, which capped insulin at $35.
- Nick Gruber: Son of Marvin Gruber, a firefighter from New Tripoli, Pennsylvania, who was killed alongside fellow firefighter Zachary Paris while responding to a house fire in Schuylkill County in December 2022. He will attend alongside his wife Natalie.
- Sydney Rieckhoff: CEO of Almost Famous Popcorn, a small business popcorn company based in Cedar Rapids, Iowa, which started in 2022.
- Paulina Jimenez: A woman from Anaheim, California, originally from Guadalajara, Mexico, who is a first-generation DACA recipient and student at California State University Fullerton. She is interning on Capitol Hill and hopes to become an immigration attorney.
- Will Bankston: An East Baton Rouge Sheriff's deputy who saved a man who was trapped underwater in his car after a car crash while driving off duty on January 22.
- Anabely Lopes: A South Florida nurse who tried to have an abortion due to her baby having Trisomy 18, but had to fly out of state to Washington, D.C., for treatment due to the state's increasing abortion restrictions.
- Paul Bruchez: A rancher from Kremmling, Colorado, who owns Reeder Creek Ranch and is currently spearheading a 12-mile restoration of the Colorado River in collaboration with 12 landowners in the area to maintain its health as drought continues to shrink the river.
- Spencer Cox: The Republican Governor of Utah since 2021 who has been helping advance development and growth in his state. He has been criticized by other Republicans for being much more moderate.
- Shannon Klemann: Ventura County Teacher of the Year and environmental advocate who works as a biology teacher at Adolfo Camarillo High School in Camarillo, California, and has been working in her district for 23 years.
- Dennis ("Freedom") & Lee Horton: Two brothers from Philadelphia who were sentenced to life without parole after being convicted of second-degree murder in 1993. They spent 28 years in prison until John Fetterman and Pennsylvania Governor Tom Wolf helped clear their names in 2021. Fetterman and Wolf were able to prove that the brothers did not commit the crime, only having unknowingly given their friend, the actual murderer, a ride.
- Oksana Markarova: Ambassador of Ukraine to the United States who went to the previous State of the Union Address to seek military support and aid for her country following Russia's invasion in 2022. She is returning to the Capitol for the same reasons and is also thanking the United States for their support.
- Maurice and Kandice Barron: New York City parents of Ava Barron, a survivor of a rare form of pediatric cancer who was helped by the Biden supported Cancer Moonshot initiative. Ava was declared in remission in 2022.
- Lynette Bonar: An enrolled member of the Navajo Nation from Tuba City, Arizona, who is a former Army sergeant and medic. She has spent 19 years at the Tuba City Regional Health Care Corporation, with 8 of those being CEO. This was the first cancer center opened on a Native-American reservation and served the Navajo, Hopi, and San Juan Southern Paiute tribal members.
- Bono: Irish singer of U2 from Dublin and cofounder of ONE Campaign who has been helping fight HIV/AIDS and extreme poverty around the world. He helped bring public and bipartisan support for PEPFAR (President's Emergency Plan for AIDS Relief) in 2003.
- Deanna Branch: A Milwaukee woman whose son Adrian suffers from lead poisoning due to the high concentrations of the chemical in their home and drinking water. They have since moved out and shared their experience so that housing safety can be improved on.
- Kristin Christensen and Avarie Kollmar: A Seattle mother and daughter who have been working with Elizabeth Dole Foundation's "Hidden Heroes" to help children of military personnel and veterans find caregiving homes. Kristin's husband was medically retired from the Navy due to injuries in 2021.
- Ruth Cohen: A woman from Rockville, Maryland, who is a Holocaust survivor and volunteer at the United States Holocaust Memorial Museum. She and her family were sent to Auschwitz-Birkenau, but Ruth was liberated in 1945 and immigrated to the United States in 1948.
- Mitzi Colin Lopez: A woman from West Chester, Pennsylvania, originally from Mexico, who has been a DACA recipient since 2015. She graduated from West Chester University and has been advocating from immigration reform.
- Maurice "Dion" Dykes: A man from Knoxville, Tennessee, currently training to become a teacher through the Registered Apprenticeship program supported by Tennessee's Grow Your Own. The programs were approved in 2022 following support from the American Rescue Plan.
- Kate Foley: A 10th grade computer-integrated manufacturing student from Arlington Heights, Illinois, at Rolling Meadows High School. They are part of a district that partners with the local community college, work-based learning opportunities with employers, and career advising programs. She is hoping to become a biomedical engineer.
- Darlene Gaffney: A woman from North Charleston, South Carolina, who was diagnosed with stage-2 breast cancer in March 2015. She joined Mount Moriah Missionary Baptist Church's Cancer Support Ministry to share her story and encourage people to get early detection and cancer screenings.
- Doug Griffin: A man from Newton, New Hampshire, who lost his daughter Courtney to fentanyl in 2014 who has been advocating for better access to addiction treatment and raising awareness about the stigma of addiction.
- Saria Gwin-Maye: A Cincinnati ironworker and member of Ironworkers Local 44 who introduced Biden to the Brent Spence Bridge in nearby Covington, Kentucky, which is set to be repaired thanks to the Bipartisan Infrastructure Law.
- Harry Miller: An Upper Arlington, Ohio, mechanical engineering senior at Ohio State University who previously played football with the Buckeyes but left the team to prioritize his mental health. He has become an advocate for mental health and emotional wellness ever since.
- Gina and Heidi Nortonsmith: A lesbian couple from Northampton, Massachusetts, who were the plaintiffs in Goodridge v. Department of Public Health, the case that made Massachusetts the first state in the country to legalize same-sex marriage. They married in 2004 on the first day that same-sex marriage licenses were issued in the state.
- Paul Pelosi: Husband of Nancy Pelosi, the Speaker of the House. He was brutally attacked with a hammer in his San Francisco house in 2022 in a failed assassination attempt on his wife, and has since recovered from the assault.
- Paul Sarzoza: A small business owner from Phoenix, Arizona, who is the CEO of Verde, a cleaning and facilities services company. His business has been growing because of his biggest customer TSMC, a semiconductor manufacturing company who is expanding due to the CHIPS Act.
- Amanda and Josh Zurawski: A couple from Austin, Texas, who tried to get an abortion because Amanda's water broke when she was only 18 weeks (3.5 months) pregnant, but couldn't because her doctors were afraid of violating the state's new abortion ban. Amanda was told to return if she developed any signs of an infection; she developed sepsis three days later and nearly died. While she survived, she still suffers from medical complications due to the delayed treatment. Amanda subsequently returned for next year's address.
- Stephen Breyer and Anthony Kennedy: First retired Supreme Court Justices to attend a state of the union since 1997.
- Skye and Penny Krebs: Sheep and cattle industry advocates.
- Jeff McGillivray: Representative from the United Association, Plumbers and Steamfitters Local 290, which consists 4,000 piping industry workers.

== See also ==
- List of joint sessions of the United States Congress
- Timeline of the Joe Biden presidency (2023 Q1)

== Notes ==
| Preceded by 2022 State of the Union Address | State of the Union addresses 2023 | Succeeded by 2024 State of the Union Address |
