= The Institute for Public Service Reporting =

Nonprofit news organization in Memphis, Tennessee

Institute for Public Service Reporting
- Formation: 2018
- Type: Nonprofit
- Purpose: Investigative journalism
- Headquarters: Memphis, Tennessee
- Key people: Marc Perrusquia (director); David Waters (assistant director); Otis Sanford (co-founder and chairman)
- Website: https://www.psrmemphis.org/

The Institute for Public Service Reporting (also known as The Institute for Public Service Reporting at the University of Memphis) is a nonprofit news organization based in Memphis, Tennessee.

Its website states that it is a professionally staffed newsroom focused on independent investigative reporting and in-depth explanatory journalism while providing hands-on training to university students.

Housed in the Edward J. Meeman Journalism Building on the University of Memphis campus, the newsroom is a semi-autonomous branch of the university and is not formally part of the Department of Journalism and Strategic Media.

Articles produced by The Institute for Public Service Reporting are free to the public on its website. It also partners with Memphis' public radio affiliate, WKNO-FM.

== History ==
In 2018, The University of Memphis opened The Institute of Public Service Reporting on campus to produce robust, independent investigative and enterprise reporting while also providing hands-on training to students.

As the first step in the effort, it hired award-winning investigative reporter Marc Perrusquia as Distinguished Journalist in Residence and director with Louis Graham, former The Commercial Appeal editor. Perrusquia had recently left The Commercial Appeal after a 29-year career.

The Institute was created around the same time an online-only newspaper called The Daily Memphian emerged, which had a paywall with subscribers paying $7 per month. At that time the two news outlets entered into an agreement where investigative news stories created by the Institute would be published on The Daily Memphian website through a paid-use agreement. The termination of that agreement was announced on March 13, 2023 by a joint letter posted to The Daily Memphian website, from Eric Barnes, CEO of the latter, and Marc Perrusquia, Director of the Institute for Public Service Reporting.

In 2019, award-winning Memphis journalist David Waters joined the staff as assistant director.

In 2022, Laura Faith Kebede was brought on as the third full time staff reporter, serving as coordinator of "Civil Wrongs", a serialized reporting project that investigates unsolved and unresolved murders of the civil rights era as well as historical and modern abuses ranging from environmental injustice to voter suppression and police oppression.

== Notable reporting and projects ==
Starting in June 2020, The Institute for Public Service Reporting began reporting a series of articles in response to the city of Memphis' delay in fulfilling public record requests for excessive-force complaints filed against Memphis Police Department officers over the last five years, which would have cost $6,000 in fees.

Rather than pay the fee, the Institute's Director, Marc Perrusquia asked to inspect the records on-site instead. The Memphis Police Department only allowed two appointments per week and three hours for each appointment. Memphis Councilman JB Smiley Jr. introduced a transparency resolution in June 2020 after reading the report by the Institute for Public Service Reporting.

In February 2021, The Reporters Committee's Local Legal represented Perrusquia in a lawsuit against The city of Memphis after it had denied records requests seeking body camera footage from three separate incidents of alleged use of excessive force by city police officer Colin Berryhill. A Memphis Police Department internal investigation found that Berryhill violated the department's policies against excessive or unnecessary use of force three times between May 2018 and April 2019. The City responded to the lawsuit by creating a new written policy that all administrative investigations in which a Memphis police officer is found to have used excessive force would be referred to the Shelby County District Attorney.

Two days after the lawsuit the police department referred the case to District Attorney Amy Weirich, who declined to file charges. The case was dismissed in March, after Perrusquia received copies of all requested bodycam footage.

In April 2022, The Reporters Committee helped Perrusquia file another lawsuit over three separate public requests with the city of Memphis for the records related to three current or former Memphis Police Department officers who had been subject to disciplinary proceedings. The reason given for the denial was that the records were exempt from disclosure under Tennessee's public records law.

In 2021 WKNO-FM and the Institute for Public Service Reporting won second place in the Public Service in Radio Journalism category of the 71st Annual Green Eyeshade Awards for "The Waiting Decade: Rape Victims Still Seek Justice."

In response the Institute's historical investigation into Clifford Davis' ties to the Ku Klux Klan, Odell Horton, U.S. Rep. Steve Cohen was sent a bill in Congress to remove his name from the federal building in downtown, Memphis, replacing it with the name of Odell Horton, the first Black federal judge appointed in West Tennessee since Reconstruction.

== Funding ==
While The University of Memphis has provided The Institute for Public Service Reporting with significant financial support, it also has received funding from the Report For America, Knight Foundation, Meta Journalism Project, the Walton Family Foundation, in addition to individual donations.

The Institute for Public Service Reporting is a member of and subscribes to the standards of editorial independence adopted by the Institute for Nonprofit News.

== Board members ==
- Otis Sanford
- Gayle S. Rose
- Meribah Knight
- Ruby Bright
- Lucian T. Pera
- Daphene R. McFerren
- Dr. Joe Hayden
- Dan Norwood

== See also ==
- List of newspapers in Tennessee
- Mass media in Memphis, Tennessee
