= Killing of Tyre Nichols =

2023 police killing of American man

- Still image from pole-mounted CCTV footage
- Location: 35.03013°N 89.83903°W; Memphis, Shelby County, Tennessee, U.S.
- Date: Traffic stop: January 7, 2023 c. 8:34 p.m. (CST); Death of Nichols: January 10, 2023
- Attack type: Homicide by blunt trauma; police brutality
- Victims: Tyre Nichols, aged 29
- Perpetrators: Tadarrius Bean; Demetrius Haley; Desmond Mills Jr.; Emmitt Martin III; Justin Smith
- Charges: Federal: Deprivation of rights under color of law resulting in death; Willful disregarding of medical needs resulting in death; Conspiracy to make false statements; Obstruction of justice; State: Second-degree murder; Aggravated assault; Aggravated kidnapping (2 counts); Official misconduct (2 counts); Official oppression
- Verdict: Federal: Mills, Martin: Pleaded guilty Haley: Guilty on all counts Bean, Smith: Guilty of obstruction of justice, not guilty on remaining counts State: Mills, Martin: Pleaded guilty Bean, Haley, Smith; Not guilty on all counts
- Convictions: Mills, Martin: Deprivation of rights under color of law resulting in death; Conspiracy to make false statements; Haley: Deprivation of rights resulting in bodily injury; Willful disregarding of medical needs resulting in bodily injury; Conspiracy to make false statements; Obstruction of justice; Bean, Smith: Obstruction of justice

On January 7, 2023, Tyre Nichols, a 29-year-old black American man, was fatally injured by five black police officers in Memphis, Tennessee, and died three days later. The officers, all members of the Memphis Police Department (MPD) SCORPION (Note: SCORPION is an acronym for Street Crimes Operation to Restore Peace in Our Neighborhoods.) unit, pulled Nichols from his car before pepper spraying and tasering him. Nichols broke free and ran toward his mother's house, which was less than a mile (1.6 km) away. The officers caught up with Nichols near the house, where they punched, kicked and pepper sprayed him and struck him with a baton. Medics called to the scene did not administer emergency care until 16 minutes after arriving. Nichols was admitted to the hospital in critical condition.

The officers reported that they stopped Nichols for reckless driving. The MPD released four edited video clips from police body cameras and a nearby pole-mounted camera. MPD Police Chief Cerelyn J. Davis later stated that the department had reviewed camera footage and could not find any evidence of probable cause for the traffic stop.

The Tennessee Bureau of Investigation and the United States Department of Justice both opened investigations into the incident. The autopsy determined the cause of death as blunt force trauma to the head, and the manner of death as homicide.

The five officers who assaulted Nichols were discharged from the MPD, effective January 8, 2023. They were arrested and charged on January 26 with second-degree murder, aggravated kidnapping, aggravated assault, official misconduct, and official oppression. A sixth officer, Preston Hemphill, who was white and present at the initial traffic stop, was also fired from the MPD in February 2023 for violating "multiple department policies" but was not criminally charged after prosecutors determined he was not present at the scene where Nichols suffered his fatal injuries. Three of the officers have pleaded not guilty to the charges. One officer, Desmond Mills Jr., pleaded guilty to federal charges of deprivation of rights and conspiracy and agreed to cooperate with prosecutors on November 2, 2023. Another officer, Emmitt Martin III, who initially pleaded not guilty, changed his plea to guilty on August 23, 2024. The MPD has disciplined, relieved of duty, dismissed, or arrested thirteen officers regarding their conduct. Memphis Fire Services terminated three employees for their failure to evaluate or assist Nichols. After the release of the videos, widespread protests began on January 27.

The five officers involved were also charged with civil rights violations by federal authorities in connection with the killing. One of them, Mills, later pleaded guilty to these charges. Mills later agreed to plead guilty to all state charges as well, including murder. A second officer, Martin, pleaded guilty in August 2024. Martin would ultimately plead guilty to all states charges brought against him as well. On October 3, 2024, Haley was convicted of all four counts he was charged with, including civil rights deprivation related charges, while Bean and Smith would each be convicted of one lesser count related to witness tampering. Bean, Haley and Smith were acquitted of all state charges on May 7, 2025.

== People involved ==
=== Tyre Nichols ===
Tyre Deandre Nichols (June 5, 1993 – January 10, 2023) was a 29-year-old black man. Nichols worked for FedEx and was a photographer with a photography website.

Nichols was raised in Sacramento, California, and moved to Memphis in February 2020. His mother is RowVaughn Wells. According to his family's attorney, Nichols was "almost impossibly slim" due to Crohn's disease, and weighed 145 pounds (66 kilograms) at a height of 6 feet 3 inches (1.91 meters).

=== Police officers ===
The five black Memphis Police Department (MPD) officers accused of beating Nichols in connection to the traffic stop each had two to six years of police experience. Four of the five officers were raised in the Memphis area.

- Tadarrius Bean, age 24, hired in August 2020.
- Demetrius Haley, age 30, hired in August 2020 (a former corrections officer; first officer at initial traffic stop);
- Emmitt Martin III, age 30, hired in March 2018 (second officer at initial traffic stop);
- Desmond Mills Jr., age 32, hired in March 2017 (a former jailer in Mississippi and Tennessee).
- Justin Smith, age 28, hired in March 2018.

Four out of the five officers had prior disciplinary actions by MPD for various offences. All five were members of an MPD 30-person specialized hot spot policing unit known as SCORPION (Street Crimes Operation to Restore Peace In Our Neighborhoods).

==== DeWayne Smith ====
Lt. DeWayne Smith, an officer with 25 years' experience, was a supervisor in the SCORPION unit on the scene at the time of Nichols's beating. Smith retired the day before an administrative hearing in which he was expected to be dismissed. Smith was subsequently considered for decertification, which bars police officers from working again in the jurisdiction that certified them. The documents accompanying the decertification request contended that Smith had (1) failed to address Nichols's complaint that he could not breathe; (2) failed to obtain reports from the police officers as to their use of force; (3) told Nichols family that Nichols had been driving under the influence, despite a lack of information to support such a charge; and (4) failed to wear a body camera, in violation of the police department's policy.

The MPD requested that the Tennessee Peace Officer Standards and Training Commission (POST) decertify Smith. It then asked to rescind that request, at which point POST asked the department for an explanation as to its reversal. In a news release, the MPD announced it would continue with the request, saying it had merely meant to ask for a delay and clarifying information as to whether an officer who resigned prior to termination could be decertified.

==== Preston Hemphill ====
Preston Hemphill, a white officer who was hired by the MPD in 2018, was identified as a sixth officer involved in the initial traffic stop. Hemphill was among the first officers to encounter Nichols during the January 7 traffic stop. He deployed his Taser during the confrontation and in his body camera video is seen chasing Nichols down the road, but then turns back to the scene of the initial traffic stop. Hemphill was heard on his body camera video saying twice, "I hope they stomp his ass," after Nichols fled the scene.

On January 30, 2023, the Memphis Police Department announced that Hemphill had been relieved of duty pending the outcome of an administrative investigation. On February 3, 2023, Hemphill was fired from the Memphis Police Department for violations including personal conduct, truthfulness, and a violation for not using the Taser in compliance with regulations. While on top of Nichols at the initial stop, Hemphill used the statement, "Get on the fucking ground. Finna tase yo ass," according to the police decertification letter Memphis Police sent to Tennessee's Peace Officer Standards & Training Commission.

On May 2, 2023, Shelby County District Attorney Steve Mulroy announced that Hemphill would not be criminally charged in connection with Nichols's death. Mulroy stated that the decision followed a "thorough investigation," including reviewing hours of body camera footage and interviewing witnesses. He noted that "by no means do we endorse the conduct of officer Hemphill at that first traffic stop," but explained that "Hemphill did not pursue Tyre Nichols and never left the initial scene," and was not involved in the second encounter where Nichols was brutally beaten by police. Hemphill was added to the department's Giglio list, which identifies law enforcement officers who have had sustained incidents of untruthfulness or other issues placing their credibility into question.

The Nichols family, through their attorney Ben Crump, stated they supported the decision not to press charges against Hemphill. Crump said in a statement: "It is our deepest hope and expectation that justice will be served fully, and that all who had a role to play in this senseless tragedy will be held accountable." Hemphill was also named in the $550 million civil lawsuit filed on behalf of Nichols's family.

Hemphill's attorney, Lee Gerald, stated that his client was cooperating with authorities in the investigation and expected that he would testify at trial in the case.

=== SCORPION Unit ===
SCORPION was assembled by Memphis Police Chief Cerelyn J. Davis, in October 2021, to deal with serious crimes; Davis disbanded SCORPION in the wake of Nichols' death. SCORPION unit officers drove unmarked cars and many dressed in plainclothes and wore bulletproof vests marked "Police".

SCORPION has been compared to the "RED DOG" unit Davis commanded in 2006 and 2007 as a member of the Atlanta Police Department in Atlanta, Georgia. Davis described the Red Dog as utilizing "aggressive crime fighting strategies in high crime areas citywide". The Red Dog unit was disbanded in 2011 after the city agreed to settle a lawsuit regarding excessive force by Red Dog officers.

== Traffic stop and death ==
External videos
- Footage published by the City of Memphis
- Video 1 – MPD body camera footage, initial traffic stop (from Officer Preston Hemphill)
- Video 2 – From pole-mounted CCTV camera footage, second detainment location
- Video 3 – MPD body camera footage, second detainment location (from Officer Desmond Mills Jr.)
- Video 4 – MPD body camera footage, from the second detainment location

Nichols was two minutes away from his home when he was stopped by MPD at 8:24 p.m. on January 7, 2023. Officers Haley, Martin, and Preston Hemphill conducted the initial stop of Nichols at the intersection of both East Raines Road and Ross Road near the Autumn Ridge neighborhood, with police vehicles surrounding his car on three sides. The body-worn camera footage released by the City of Memphis on January 27, does not "show any activity earlier than an officer responding to a stop in progress..."

Haley and Martin were at the traffic stop when Hemphill arrived at 8:24 p.m. By 8:25 p.m., Haley pulled Nichols out of his car as Nichols said: "I didn't do anything." An officer shouted: "Get on the fuckin' ground" and moments later an officer shouted "I'm gonna tase your ass." Officers pushed Nichols to the ground. At about 8:25:45 p.m., Nichols was lying on his side in the road – an officer had Nichols's left hand, a second officer had Nichols's right hand, a third officer held a taser against Nichols's left leg while also using his right hand to hold Nichols to the ground. From the moment that Nichols was pulled from the car, to being held on the ground, officers simultaneously yelled numerous commands, threats, expletives, and made "assaultive comments" at him. While being held on the ground an officer continued to yell for Nichols to lie down. Nichols responded "I am on the ground". An officer yelled back "Lay on your stomach". Moments later, Haley deployed pepper spray against Nichols, which hit several of the other officers. Nichols broke free and began to run. Hemphill deployed his taser at Nichols. At 8:26 p.m., Nichols began running south on Ross Road, as he was pursued by at least two officers. Two more police units arrived at the scene around 8:29 p.m. Footage showed that one officer who remained at the area of the traffic stop said, "I hope they stomp his ass".

At 8:33 p.m., Officers Bean, Mills, and Smith caught up to Nichols and had him on the ground at Castlegate Lane and Bear Creek which is approximately a half a mile (800 meters) away from the original traffic stop. Footage from a pole-mounted CCTV camera showed an officer using his leg to push Nichols hard to the ground. Between 8:33 p.m. and 8:36 p.m. Nichols was punched, then pepper sprayed a second time, then kicked in the upper torso numerous times by a fourth officer, then an officer can be heard yelling "I'm going to baton the fuck out of you” before striking Nichols several times with a baton, then punched five times in the face by one officer. The video footage showed officers had control of Nichols's arms when he was struck with the baton, kicked, and successively punched in the face 5 times. A fifth officer arrived, as Nichols was on the ground and in the process of being handcuffed, and kicked him in the upper torso, which was followed by another kick to the upper torso by another officer. Fox News reported that in the videos, "Nichols can be heard calling out to his mother before police beat him into a daze". Nichols's conduct had been initially described as non-resisting and non-violent; there is no indication that he struck back at the officers.

By 8:37 p.m., Nichols was handcuffed and limp; officers propped him against the side of a police car. After Nichols was on the ground, the involved officers convened and shared their stories about the arrest. In the body-worn camera footage, Michael Ruiz of Fox News reported, "officers can be heard discussing his alleged driving, 'swerving' and nearly hitting one of them". One officer bragged: "I was hitting him with straight haymakers, dog", while another exclaimed: "I jumped in, started rocking him."

Medics arrived around 8:41 p.m. but did not begin to assist Nichols until 16 minutes later. An ambulance from the Memphis Fire Department arrived at 9:02 p.m. and took Nichols to St. Francis Hospital at 9:18 p.m. after he complained of shortness of breath.

On scene, video footage showed officers issued at least 71 commands over 13 minutes; The New York Times described the orders as "often simultaneous and contradictory" and "sometimes even impossible to obey". The Times cited one such example of many, where an officer shouted "Give me your fucking hands!" while Nichols had one officer pinning his arms behind his back, a second officer holding his handcuffed wrist, and a third officer punching Nichols's face. One former police officer described the officers' interaction with Nichols as having "started with poor communication" and going downhill from there. Nichols's family lawyers say that he was tortured to death by police officers.

On January 8, the department stated that the traffic stop of Nichols was due to reckless driving. On January 27, Memphis Police Chief Cerelyn J. Davis stated that her department reviewed footage, including from body cameras regarding the traffic stop and the arrest, to "determine what that probable cause was and we have not been able to substantiate that – ...It doesn't mean that something didn't happen, but there's no proof." A subsequent search of Nichol's car by police found credit and debit cards that did not belong to Nichols.

Nichols died in the hospital three days later, on January 10.

== Investigations ==
=== Police report ===
A police report was written two hours after Nichols was beaten. The report claimed that at the initial traffic stop Nichols was irate, sweating profusely when he left his vehicle, and he refused to be detained. Pepper spray and a taser were ineffective in controlling Nichols. For the second encounter between Nichols and police, the report claimed that Nichols resisted arrest by grabbing an officer's duty belt and another officer's vest, ignored their orders, leading to officers using pepper spray and striking Nichols with a baton; Nichols was eventually taken into custody after "several verbal" commands.

The released videos did not corroborate the police report's claim that Nichols "started to fight" with officers, or even that he had been violent at all. The released videos also did not corroborate the officers' claim that Nichols reached for their weapons. Seth Stoughton, a law professor and use-of-force expert, noted that an officer typically shouts it out immediately if they see a suspect reach for a weapon, and none did so in the videos of their struggles with Nichols. The initial police report did not state that officers had punched or kicked Nichols.

=== Autopsy ===
Preliminary findings of an autopsy commissioned by Nichols's family indicate that he "suffered excessive bleeding caused by a severe beating".

The autopsy conducted by the Shelby County Medical Examiner's Office (SCMEO) confirmed the cause of death as blunt force trauma to the head, and classified the manner of death as homicide. A toxicology analysis found that Nichols's blood alcohol content was 0.049, and also the presence of tetrahydrocannabinol (THC).

The SCMEO summarized his injuries as blunt force injuries to his head, neck, torso and extremities; multiple cortical contusions; and several instances of hemorrhages throughout his body. It also lists multiple contusions, abrasions, and bruising to his body.

The report also said he suffered brain hemorrhages and liver failure.

=== Dismissals, criminal charges and lawsuits ===
On January 7, Shelby County District Attorney Steve Mulroy asked the Tennessee Bureau of Investigation to investigate allegations of excessive use of force during the arrest.

The MPD sent a change of status form, summary of charges, hearing summary, and decertification request to the Tennessee Peace Officer Standards and Training Commission (POST), informing them that the five accused MPD officers were relieved of duty effective January 8, 2023.

MPD Deputy Chief M. Hardy was the Hearing Officer for each of five hearings. In the hearing summary specific to Haley's conduct, Hardy upheld the charge that Haley violated MPD DR 603 INFORMATION CONCERNING POLICE BUSINESS by taking pictures in front of Nichols and sharing the photos with at least six individuals both within the MPD and an acquaintance. Hardy described each Officers conduct as "unjustly, blatantly unprofessional and unbecoming for a sworn public servant."

On January 15, MPD announced the officers involved would face administrative action. The U.S. Department of Justice and the Federal Bureau of Investigation (FBI) also opened a civil rights investigation. On January 20, MPD announced that the five officers would be fired.

By January 24, two Memphis Fire Services (MFS) emergency medical technicians (EMTs), Robert Long and JaMichael Sandridge, who were on scene had been relieved of duty without further explanation. A week later, a total of three MFS employees had been fired – the two EMTs and an MFS lieutenant, Michelle Whitaker – for failing to conduct a proper assessment or treatment to Nichols, a break in policies and procedures.

On January 30, authorities announced that two other police officers, Preston Hemphill, and an unidentified officer, had also been relieved of duty. On February 3, it was announced that Hemphill had also been fired. Hemphill, who is White, had been involved in the initial traffic stop and tasing but not in the subsequent filmed beating.

On February 14, the Shelby County Sheriff's Office, which is independent of the MPD, announced in a press release, that Sheriff Deputies Jeremy Watkins and Johntavious Bowers were suspended for five days without pay following an internal investigation. County Sheriff Floyd Bonner Jr. said that Watkins and Bowers violated:

- Radio Communication Procedures — Failed to notify dispatchers and supervisor that they responded to the Nichols traffic stop.
- Mobile Video Recording System Procedures — Failed to document their presence at the scene or report the incident in daily activity logs.
- Patrol Field Job Duties and Responsibilities — Failed to activate patrol vehicle's mobile video recording unit ("dash cam")
- Operation Responsibility of Daily Activity Log (Watkins only) — Failed to activate body-worn cameras.

Bonner added he does not expect his deputies to face criminal charges. Both deputies have been in their positions since June 2021.

Nichols's family retained attorneys Benjamin Crump and Antonio Romanucci.

==== State charges ====
On January 24, 2023, the five officers were arrested and charged with second degree murder, aggravated assault, aggravated kidnapping, official misconduct, and official oppression. As of January 27, all five men had posted bail and been released, according to Shelby County Jail records.

On January 26, 2023, the Grand Jury of the State of Tennessee indicted each of the five MPD officers for multiple charges: second-degree murder, aggravated assault, aggravated kidnapping (two counts), official misconduct (two counts), and official oppression.

On February 16, the five former MPD officers appeared at the Shelby County Criminal Court and pleaded not guilty to all of their charges. On August 18, three of the five officers requested separate trials. On October 2 Shelby county judge James Jones Jr issued an order denying those requests, saying that severing the cases is not required to protect their rights to a “fair determination” of their guilt or innocence.

On November 2, 2023, it was reported that Mills had agreed to plead guilty to all of the state charges as part of an agreement with federal prosecutors. The District Attorney's office confirmed that Mills would testify against the other officers as part of the deal. Martin would ultimately plead guilty to state charges against him as well.

The trial of Bean, Haley and Smith began on April 28, 2025. On May 7, 2025, after a 9-day trial and 8 1/2 hours of deliberations over a two-day period, a Tennessee jury delivered not guilty verdicts on all counts for all three officers.

==== Federal charges ====
In September 2023, federal prosecutors charged the five officers involved with depriving Nichols of his civil rights (by both beating him and failing to administer first aid), obstructing the investigation and conspiracy to commit witness tampering. Haley's attorney called the charges "disappointing" and said his client would plead not guilty. Smith, Haley, Mills and Bean appeared in court on September 13 and entered pleas of not guilty. Martin, at a separate court appearance later that month, also pleaded not guilty to the charges against him.

On November 2, 2023, Mills pleaded guilty to depriving Nichols of his rights and conspiring to make false statements as part of an agreement with prosecutors that also saw him agree to plead guilty to all of the state charges, including murder, in exchange for a prosecution recommendation for a 15-year sentence. He will remain free until his sentencing, which was initially set to happen in May 2024 but was later postponed to November 2024.

On August 23, 2024, Martin, the second officer to come into contact with Nichols during the fatal January 7, 2023 traffic stop and, along with Haley, one of the two officers who forced Nichols from his vehicle, changed his plea to guilty. Martin pleaded guilty to two of the four federal charges against him, excessive force and witness tampering charges. During this hearing, U.S. District Judge Mark Norris also set an August 26 deadline for any plea agreements in the case.

The federal trial of the other three defendants began on September 9, 2024. Defense attorneys for Bean and Haley rested their case on September 30, 2024. On October 2, U.S. District Judge Mark Norris delivered the jury instructions, which were read ahead of the closing arguments. Closing arguments would then be presented that night.

On October 3, the jury began deliberations. After five hours of deliberation, the federal jury convicted Haley, Bean and Smith on various charges. Haley was convicted of all four counts with which he was charged, namely, deprivation of rights, bodily injury, conspiracy, and obstruction. However, Bean and Smith were each found guilty on only one lesser count of obstruction related to witness tampering and were found not guilty on two more severe counts related to deprivation of rights and bodily injury, as well as one lesser count of conspiracy. In addition, the jury also found that for the first two counts related to deprivation and bodily injury, Haley's actions resulted in injury and not death. All three officers were subsequently taken into custody while awaiting sentencing, but Bean and Smith were later released into home detention with GPS monitoring.

The three defendants have been scheduled to be sentenced in January 2025, while Martin was slated to be sentenced on December 5, 2024. On October 16, 2024, Mills's sentencing date was pushed back to February 20, 2025. Sentencing for all five officers was later again delayed, until the week of June 16, 2025.

On June 13, 2025, judge Norris recused himself from the case, days before officers were scheduled to be sentenced, and case was reassigned to U.S. District Judge Sheryl H. Lipman. As a result, sentencing was delayed again. On July 24, 2025, sentencing was set in the week of December 15, 2025.

On August 28, 2025, judge Lipman ordered a new trial for Bean, Haley and Smith, citing concerns of bias after a judge presiding over the first trial allegedly suggested one of the defendants was a gang member. On September 10, 2025, Haley was released from custody.

==== Civil lawsuit ====
On April 19, 2023, Nichols's family filed a $550 million lawsuit against City of Memphis, Memphis Police Department, police chief, and officers involved.

== Aftermath ==
After Nichols's death, Chief Davis called for a review of the SCORPION unit, and the unit was disbanded on January 28.

In the weeks after Nichols's death, The Institute for Public Service Reporting in Memphis reviewed reports that appear to show SCORPION units engaged in "zero-tolerance" or "proactive policing"-type activities. The review revealed that often SCORPION units initiated contact for minor crimes like a seat belt violation, a tinted window violation, or low-level drug offenses. This tactic tended to escalate the use of aggressive tactics by the police with little supervision.

A GoFundMe campaign was created by family members of Nichols that states "We want to build a memorial skate park for Tyre, in honor of his love for skating and sunsets." By January 29, the GoFundMe campaign had raised nearly US$1 million.

On the evening of January 31, 2023, a ceremony and press conference with Nichols's family was held at the Mason Temple Church in Memphis, where Martin Luther King Jr. gave his final speech "I've Been to the Mountaintop" in 1968. Nichols's funeral was held the next day at the Mississippi Boulevard Christian Church in Memphis. During the service, U.S. Vice President Kamala Harris and Reverend Al Sharpton called for the approval of the George Floyd Justice in Policing Act and other police reforms.

U.S. Representative Steven Horsford invited Nichols's parents to attend President Joe Biden's 2023 State of the Union Address. Biden discussed the difficulty black and brown families have when preparing their children for confrontations with the law. For example, Biden said that such families tell their children that when "a police officer pulls you over, turn on your interior lights. Don't reach for your license. Keep your hands on the steering wheel."

According to Biden, Nichols's mother told him her son was "a beautiful soul and something good will come from this". Biden said that society should "Give law enforcement the training they need, hold them to higher standards, and help them succeed in keeping everyone safe."

On March 24, 2023, it was announced that the Peace Officer Standards & Training Commission voted to decertify four of the five police officers involved, barring them from working as officers in Tennessee. They were given 30 days to appeal the decision.

=== Protests ===
On January 27, the police body-worn camera video footage of the incident was released to the public. Chief Davis stated that officials "decided it would be best to release the video later in the day after schools are dismissed and people are home from work" due to concern over the civil unrest that might result after its release.

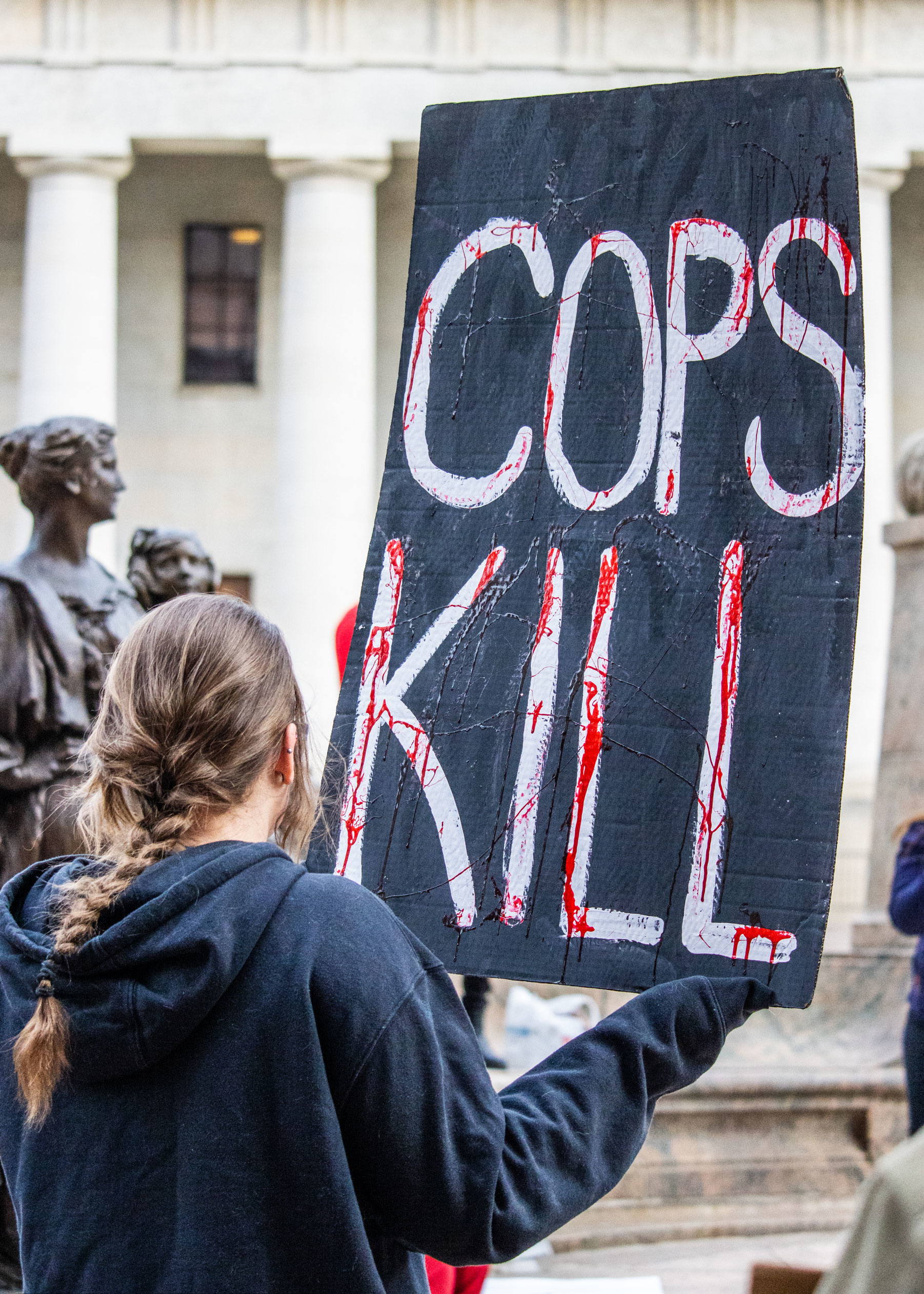
Protest in Columbus, Ohio

Following the release of the video, protesters in Memphis blocked traffic on Interstate 55. By January 28, protests had also occurred in New York City, Chicago, Washington, D.C., Philadelphia, Los Angeles, Portland, Atlanta, San Francisco, Boston, Baltimore, and Newark.

=== Reactions ===
U.S. President Joe Biden spoke with the Nichols family and joined in their call for peaceful protest. Biden also told the family that he would renew a push with Congress to pass the George Floyd Justice in Policing Act to tackle police misconduct.

Various police officers reacted to the death of Tyre Nichols. Police Chief Davis released a video statement where she said, "This is not just a professional failing. This is a failing of basic humanity toward another individual." On January 27, in an appearance on Good Morning America, she said, "In my 36 years, [...] I would have to say I don't think I've ever been more horrified and disgusted, sad" about the video, and it was "still very unclear" as to why the officers stopped Nichols. New York City Police Commissioner Keechant Sewell, denounced what she called "disgraceful actions", while Chicago Police Superintendent, David O. Brown, called the video "horrific". On the day of the video's release, FBI Director Christopher Wray said he was appalled by the video, and Patrick Yoes, the national president of the Fraternal Order of Police, stated that "The event as described to us does not constitute legitimate police work or a traffic stop gone wrong. This is a criminal assault under the pretext of law." New York City Mayor Eric Adams, a retired captain from the NYPD, told the press that the White House had briefed him and other mayors on the video ahead of its release and that it would "trigger pain and sadness in many of us. It will make us angry."

A moment of silence was held for Nichols before the NBA basketball game in Minneapolis at the Target Center on January 27 between the Memphis Grizzlies and Minnesota Timberwolves.

The Legal Aid Society of New York City released a statement that included, "We must continue to question the police's role in society, as these incidents frequently recur, and many more happen all the time without being captured on body-worn cameras." On January 29, Senate Judiciary Chair Dick Durbin said, "We need a national conversation about policing in a responsible, constitutional and humane way. These men and women with badges put them on each day and risk their lives for us. I know that, but we also see from these videos horrible conduct by these same officers in unacceptable situations."

The Black Lives Matter Global Network Foundation issued a statement that stated, "Although the media has spent a great amount of time drawing attention to the fact that the police officers are black as if that is important, let us be clear: all police represent the interest of capitalism and impel state-sanctioned violence. Anyone who works within a system that perpetuates state-sanctioned violence is complicit in upholding white supremacy."

In June 2023 the Regency Community Skate Park in Sacramento was renamed to the Tyre Nichols Skate Park.

== See also ==
- List of unarmed African Americans killed by law enforcement officers in the United States
- Lists of killings by law enforcement officers in the United States
- List of killings by law enforcement officers in the United States, January 2023
- Police brutality in the United States
- Police corruption
- Killing of Kelly Thomas
- Beating of Rodney King
