= 2022 State of the Union Address =

Speech by US President Joe Biden

- Full video of the speech as published by the White House
- Date: March 1, 2022
- Time: 9:00 pm (EST)
- Duration: 1 hour, 1 minute
- Venue: House Chamber, United States Capitol
- Location: Washington, D.C.; 38°53′19.8″N 77°00′32.8″W
- Type: State of the Union Address
- Participants: Joe Biden; Kamala Harris; Nancy Pelosi
- Footage: C-SPAN
- Previous: 2021 Joint session speech
- Next: 2023 State of the Union Address
- Website: Full text by Archives.gov

Joe Biden, the 46th president of the United States, delivered a State of the Union address on March 1, 2022, at 9:00 p.m. EST, in the chamber of the United States House of Representatives to the 117th United States Congress.

It was Biden's first State of the Union Address and his second speech to a joint session of the United States Congress. Presiding over this joint session was the House speaker, Nancy Pelosi, accompanied by Kamala Harris, the vice president, in her capacity as the president of the Senate. (Note: Biden's speech on April 28, 2021 was the first time that two women presided over a joint session of Congress. This was the first State of the Union Address to do so.)

Biden's speech was primarily focused on the Russian invasion of Ukraine, which began six days earlier, as well as his touting of major policy achievements and goals surrounding the COVID-19 pandemic, the economy, and social issues.

== Address ==
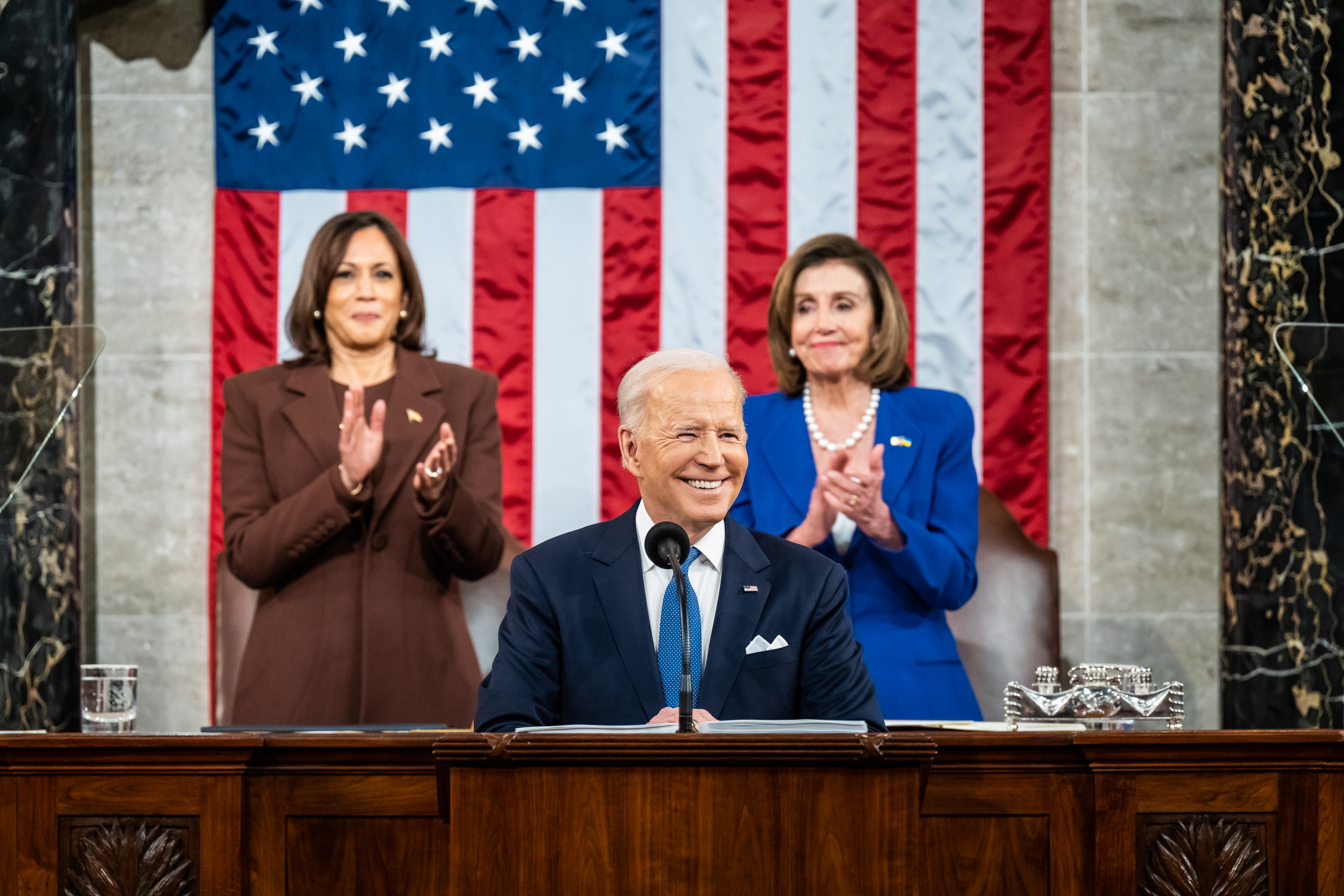
President Biden delivering the State of the Union address to the U.S. Congress

Referring to Russia's ongoing invasion of Ukrainian territory, Biden called for worldwide solidarity with the Ukrainian people. At one point all in attendance gave a standing ovation to the Ukrainian ambassador who was in attendance, with many lawmakers wearing or holding Ukrainian flags in support. The recent invasion prompted the White House to drastically alter the speech just days before as events unfolded in Ukraine. However, in a widely reported gaffe, Biden mistakenly referred to Ukrainians as the "Iranian people" while addressing Congress. Biden rebuked calls to defund the police, saying "the answer is not to defund the police. It's to fund the police". This drew criticism from some Black Lives Matter activists, including Democratic representative Cori Bush.

Biden used the opportunity to outline a four-point unity agenda that included Biden's emphasis on a cancer moonshot, care for veterans, tackling drug abuse, and addressing mental health.

=== Date ===
The date of the address, March 1, was approximately one month later than usual; all State of the Union addresses since 1934 have occurred in either January or early February. Some observers in the media attributed the cause of the delay to the spread of the Omicron variant during the ongoing COVID-19 pandemic, along with the United States’ participation in the 2022 Winter Olympics. Additionally, Clare Foran and Kevin Liptak stated in an article published by CNN that the delay "would give Biden more time to try to accomplish some of his legislative goals before addressing Congress and the nation". Although the Constitution of the United States requires the president to give Congress information about the "State of the Union", it does not specify when or how frequently this must occur, only "from time to time".

=== Disruptions ===
GOP representatives Marjorie Taylor Greene and Lauren Boebert heckled Biden throughout the speech. At one point, the duo attempted to start a chant of the Trumpist political slogan, "Build the wall". Boebert also criticized the American presence in Afghanistan by shouting "You put them in, 13 of them", in reference to the 13 service members who died in the 2021 Kabul airport attack. A number of lawmakers booed Representative Boebert in response to her interruption of the President.

== Responses ==
=== Republican Party ===
Iowa governor Kim Reynolds gave the Republican response to the State of the Union address. She mentioned the withdrawal of United States troops from Afghanistan and the Russian invasion of Ukraine. She also criticized the president's approach to foreign policy as "too little, too late." Relating to domestic policy, she criticized high inflation rates. She also criticized mask mandates and Democrats' handling of the COVID-19 pandemic in the United States. She said that as Governor of Iowa, her state was the first to reopen schools. She also criticized Biden's border policy.

=== Green Party ===
North Carolina Senate candidate Matthew Hoh gave the Green Party's response to the State of the Union Address. He drew parallels between the United States invasion of Afghanistan and the ongoing Russian invasion of Ukraine, which he claimed "has verily nearly everything to do with liquid natural gas markets, and other commercial concerns, and with the megalomania of those in DC, Moscow, London, and Kyiv." He argued that wars and the failure to stymie the COVID-19 pandemic are evidence that the government puts profit over people, and that "our government will respond to the climate crisis" in a similar manner.

=== Libertarian Party ===
The chair of the Libertarian National Committee Whitney Bilyeu gave the Libertarian response to the State of the Union Address. While she agreed with Biden's sanction of top level Russia politicians, she criticized the sanctions placed on Russia as a whole as she believe it would hurt common Russian people the most. She also took a general anti-war and isolationist stance toward the invasion of Ukraine, opposing military involvement of U.S. troops. She criticized mask mandates imposed by the Biden administration, seeing it as ineffectual and intrusive on personal liberty. She mentioned the inflation seen under the Biden administration and thinks it is an effect of long term adoption of Keynesian economics in U.S. government and plans to solve it through laissez-faire capitalism. She also briefly beseeches Biden to immediately pardon Edward Snowden.

=== Other ===
Representative Rashida Tlaib gave the Working Families Party response to the State of the Union address. Representative Colin Allred gave the Congressional Black Caucus response to the State of the Union, the first time ever that the caucus offered an official response to the event. Over 30 young leaders representing 26 states gave the Youth Response to the State of the Union, as part of the Young People Address the Nation event series.

== Coverage ==
=== Viewership ===
The speech was carried live in the United States by NBC, CBS, ABC, PBS, CNN, Fox News Channel, MSNBC, Newsmax TV, CNBC, NewsNation, and Black News Channel. In addition, Spanish-language networks Univision, Telemundo, and CNNe aired the speech.

Ratings for various networks:

Network	Viewers
FNC	7,206,000
ABC	6,302,000
CBS	4,857,000
CNN	4,830,000
NBC	4,705,000
MSNBC	4,057,000
Fox	1,858,000
Univision	1,350,000
Telemundo	1,160,000
Newsmax	462,000
CNBC	284,000

Broadcast networks Cable news networks

== Notable invitations ==
For the event, first lady Jill Biden and second gentleman Doug Emhoff hosted the Ukrainian ambassador to the United States, Oksana Markarova in their box. Other guests included a CEO of a major American corporation as well as citizens representing support for causes such as Native American advocacy, military spouses, nurses, teachers, students, and union workers.

The full list consisted of

- Joseph Burgess, New Employee Organization Trainer, United Steelworkers Local 1557
- Joshua Davis, 7th grader, Swift Creek Middle School, diabetes advocate
- Refynd Duro, Progressive Care Unit Nurse, Ohio State Wexner Medical Center
- Patrick Gelsinger, chief executive officer, Intel
- Frances Haugen, former Facebook Lead Product Manager on Civic Misinformation
- Melissa Isaac, Gizhwaasod ("Protector of the Young") at the Michigan Department of Education's Indigenous Education Initiative and founder of Saginaw Chippewa Indian Tribe (SCIT)'s Project AWARE Program
- Oksana Markarova, ambassador of Ukraine to the United States
- Danielle Robinson, surviving spouse of Sergeant 1st Class Heath Robinson
- Kezia Rodriguez, student-parent at Bergen Community College

== See also ==
- List of joint sessions of the United States Congress
- Timeline of the Joe Biden presidency (2022 Q1)

== Notes ==
Preceded by 2020 State of the Union Address	State of the Union addresses 2022	Succeeded by 2023 State of the Union Address
