= List of killings by law enforcement officers in the United States, January 2023 =

This is a list of people reported killed by non-military law enforcement officers in the United States in January 2023, whether in the line of duty or not, and regardless of reason or method. The listing documents the occurrence of a death, making no implications regarding wrongdoing or justification on the part of the person killed or officer involved. Killings are arranged by date of the incident that caused death. Different death dates, if known, are noted in the description. The table below lists 116 people.

== January 2023 ==
Date	Name (age) of deceased	Race	Location	Description
2023-01-31	Daemen Perea (23)	White	Rio Rancho, New Mexico	
2023-01-31	William Beach (31)	Unknown	Jackson, Ohio	
2023-01-31	Brian McCourry Jr. (37)	White	White Marsh, Maryland	Died 3/3/2023.
2023-01-31	unidentified male	Unknown	Edwards, Colorado	
2023-01-31	Joseph Jones (32)	White	Omaha, Nebraska	Police responded to reports of an active shooter at a Target store and killed Jones, who was carrying an AR-15 style rifle. Aside from Jones no casualties were reported, although shell casings indicated he had fired inside the store. Jones had been diagnosed with schizophrenia and had bought the rifle four days earlier.
2023-01-30	Robert Bigney (63)	Unknown	Pompano Beach, Florida	
2023-01-30	James Dopson (29)	White	Goodyear, Arizona	
2023-01-30	Steven Docken (38)	White	Omaha, Nebraska	
2023-01-30	Gleise Firmiano (30)	Hispanic	Big Bear, California	
2023-01-30	Craig Byl (48)	Unknown	Virginia Beach, Virginia	
2023-01-30	Joe Frasure (28)	White	Wyoming, Ohio	Police responded to a report of a burglary at a home where Frasure was cleaning out his late grandmother's belongings. When officers arrived, Frasure allegedly refused commands to exit his minivan and drove towards officers, who shot him. He was placed on life-support and died two days later on February 1.
2023-01-29	Hendrix Washington (39)	Black	Surfside Beach, South Carolina	
2023-01-29	Obob Ochan (47)	Black	Nashville, Tennessee	
2023-01-29	Terry L. Noel (50)	White	Dyersburg, Tennessee	
2023-01-28	Brandon Duvall (32)	White	Mineola, Texas	
2023-01-27	Matthew Planer (52)	White	Pocatello, Idaho	
2023-01-26	Elbert Miller (31)	White	Little Rock, Arkansas	
2023-01-26	Miguel Lopez (70)	Hispanic	Maywood, California	
2023-01-26	Anthony Mitchell (33)	White	Jasper, Alabama	Mitchell was arrested on January 12 after allegedly firing a gun during a mental health check. While in jail, correctional officers kept Mitchell in a cell with no sink, toilet, mat, or blanket. He froze to death on January 26, and his death was ruled a homicide. Multiple correctional officers were charged with depriving his rights.
2023-01-25	Anthony Lowe Jr. (36)	Black	Huntington Park, California	Police responded to reports that a man in a wheelchair stabbed another man and encountered Lowe, a double amputee whose legs were amputated below the knees after a previous police encounter. Lowe got off his wheelchair and attempted to flee using his arms while holding a knife, and officers attempted to use a taser twice, which failed. Police then shot Lowe as he brandished the knife. Police said Lowe was shot after he "attempted to throw the butcher knife at the officers again".
2023-01-25	Kyle Mills (22)	White	New Castle, Virginia	
2023-01-25	Jason Means (47)	White	Toledo, Ohio	
2023-01-25	Kenneth Lassiter (59)	White	Melbourne Beach, Florida	
2023-01-25	Joey Cesar Fraire (18)	Hispanic	Dallas, Texas	
2023-01-24	Shane Cousins (33)	White	Detroit, Michigan	
2023-01-24	Billy Couch (51)	White	Sugar Valley, Georgia	
2023-01-24	Edward E. Gant (43)	Black	Gary, Indiana	
2023-01-23	Daniel Pentkowski (53)	White	San Antonio, Texas	Pentkowski was arrested on charges of public intoxication, retaliation and resisting arrest, with a Ring camera allegedly recording the arresting officer pinning Pentkowski to the ground with his knee. Two days later, he was found dead in his cell. The Bexar County Sheriff's Office said that he had died of self-inflicted injuries, but a medical examiner ruled the death a homicide caused by the officer's restraint.
2023-01-23	Jaahnavi Kandula (23)	Indian	Seattle, Washington	Kandula was killed when crossing at a crosswalk by Seattle Police officer Kevin Dave going 74 mph without a siren while responding to a "priority-one" call in a marked SPD police cruiser. Kandula's death spurred protests in September when body camera footage surfaced of the Seattle Police Officers Guild's vice president Daniel Auderer laughing over her death and calling her "of limited value".
2023-01-23	Leroy Malone (39)	Hispanic	Dodge City, Kansas	
2023-01-23	Eli Nash (32)	Unknown	Meridian, Idaho	
2023-01-23	Edward Nandin	White	San Antonio, Texas	
2023-01-23	Michael Compton	Unknown	Salem, Oregon	
2023-01-22	unidentified male	Unknown	Clinton, Mississippi	
2023-01-22	Daniel Nevius Sr (55)	White	Sewell, New Jersey	
2023-01-22	Charles Towns (47)	Black	Altadena, California	
2023-01-22	Patrick J Boatwright (44)	Hispanic	Cuero, Texas	
2023-01-21	Harley Bagby (30)	White	Wellington, Kansas	
2023-01-21	Nicholas Ciccarelli (45)	White	Menomonie, Wisconsin	
2023-01-21	unidentified male	Unknown	Homestead, Florida	
2023-01-20	Donald Brady (69)	Unknown	Clermont, Florida	
2023-01-20	Christopher Dearman (37)	Unknown	San Diego, California	
2023-01-20	Leon Burroughs (39)	Black	Jacksonville, Florida	Burroughs was asleep in his car—with a loaded gun on the roof—when officers approached him regarding a burglary. Police removed the gun and woke Burroughs, and he did not comply when instructed multiple times to show his hands and exit the vehicle. Burroughs then fired a shot which grazed one of the officers, and he was shot dead when five officers returned fire.
2023-01-19	Eric Nathaniel Thornton (37)	White	Jacksonville, Florida	
2023-01-19	unidentified person	Unknown	Rapid City, South Dakota	
2023-01-19	unidentified male	Unknown	Laveen, Arizona	
2023-01-19	Ronald Ray Mosley II (25)	Black	Evansville, Indiana	Mosley shot a former coworker at the Walmart he was fired from in May 2022. After chasing another employee, Mosley was shot and killed by police.
2023-01-18	Jackson Lieber (21)	White	Liberty Hill, Texas	According to police Lieber crashed his car on RM 1869 before trespassing on someone's property. Few details were released about the shooting, other than that Lieber was unarmed.
2023-01-18	Manuel "Tortuguita" Esteban Paez Terán (26)	Hispanic	Atlanta, Georgia	During the Stop Cop City protest, where demonstrators protested the construction of a police training center, Georgia State Troopers attempted to clear the forest. According to police, Terán, a protester, shot a state trooper and was killed by other officers. According to other protestors who witnessed the shooting, Teran was unarmed. An independent autopsy ordered and released by Terán's family stated they were sitting cross-legged with their hands raised when they were shot 57 times. An official autopsy found that Terán did not have gunpowder residue on their hands.
2023-01-18	Joseph Smith (39)	Black	North Little Rock, Arkansas	Smith was found dead in his residence after a standoff in the 4700 block of Locust St. It's unclear if police shot Smith or he committed suicide.
2023-01-17	Darryl Tyree Williams (32)	Black	Raleigh, North Carolina	Police observed marijuana and open alcohol in Williams' car and ordered him out, where suspected cocaine was found while searching him. Williams physically resisted four officers trying to arrest him, and was told he would be tased. Williams told officers he had a heart problem after being tased and then fled with police in chase, tasering the combative Williams twice more while attempting to arrest him. Drugs and two stolen guns were found in his car. Williams died in hospital an hour later. The county's district attorney did not seek any charges. On March 18, 2024, Williams's family filed a wrongful death lawsuit against the police office.
2023-01-17	Unknown (40s)	Latino	Houston, Texas	An officer responding to a double shooting call without lights or sirens struck a woman who had stepped off the curb. The woman was not identified, although the Houston Police's Assistant Chief stated she may have been homeless.
2023-01-11	Donna Dale (47)	White	Hilliard, Florida	Deputies responded to reports of a woman threatening to harm herself. When police found her, she was in thick brush and allegedly holding a BB gun modified to look like a rifle. According to deputies Dale then pointed the BB gun at herself, and a deputy fired.
2023-01-17	Sonny Vincent (36)	White	Wentzville, Missouri	
2023-01-17	Frank Brower (77)	Unknown	El Cajon, California	
2023-01-17	Frederick Lee Fonner Jr (47)	White	McDonald, Pennsylvania	
2023-01-16	Hunter Hanson (24)	White	Union Grove, Wisconsin	
2023-01-16	Michael Bernard Emch Jr (47)	White	Seal Beach, California	
2023-01-15	Anthony Marquis Franklin (31)	Black	Austin, Texas	
2023-01-14	James Klembara	Unknown	Mcalester, Oklahoma	
2023-01-13	Penisimani Halai	Unknown	Salt Lake City, Utah	
2023-01-13	unidentified person	Unknown	Lamar County, Alabama	
2023-01-13	unidentified male	Unknown	Dos Palos, California	
2023-01-13	unidentified male	Unknown	Lake Stevens, Washington	
2023-01-11	William Henry Jr. (43)	White	Charleston, West Virginia	
2023-01-11	Jordan Pruyn (28)	White	Columbia, Missouri	
2023-01-11	Lamont Lee Lewis (46)	Black	Hampton, Virginia	
2023-01-11	Lamont Lee Lewis (46)	Black	Hampton, Virginia	
2023-01-11	unidentified male	Unknown	Joshua Tree, California	
2023-01-11	Donna Dale	White	Hilliard, Florida	
2023-01-10	Daylen Oatts	Black	Lawrence, Indiana	
2023-01-10	Christopher Torres (34)	Unknown	Southeast, New York	
2023-01-10	Christopher Lee Mercurio (50)	Unknown	Santa Clarita, California	Deputies responded to reports of a man refusing to leave a bank near the Valencia Town Center. When deputies arrived, the man allegedly started punching one of them, and police shot him.
2023-01-10	Rico Ruiz-Altamirano (33)	White	Stockton, California	
2023-01-10	Christopher Temple (40)	White	Auburn, California	
2023-01-10	Joseph Francis	White	Pompano Beach, Florida	
2023-01-09	Chiewelthap Mariar (26)	Black	Guymon, Oklahoma	The Guymon Police Department responded to a call about a disgruntled employee at a pork processing plant. Police began talking to Mariar, who allegedly produced a knife or band-cutter, and advanced toward officers. Police tried to de-escalate the situation before deploying a taser. Mariar continued advancing on officers and was shot dead.
2023-01-09	Jackie Haynes (52)	Unknown	Newnan, Georgia	The Coweta County Sheriff's Office and the Whitesburg Police Department engaged in a high-speed chase when Hayes was found driving on the wrong side of the road. The police successfully stopped him and attempted to take Hayes into custody. Hayes was tasered and pepper sprayed when he refused to leave his vehicle. When he attempted to drive away again, he was shot multiple times by a deputy. Hayes later died in the hospital, and no officers were injured.
2023-01-09	unidentified male	Unknown	Sanger, Texas	
2023-01-09	Christopher Sallee (50)	Unknown	Sanger, Texas	
2023-01-09	Douglas Price (61)	Black	Richmond, Virginia	
2023-01-08	Scott Kennedy	Native American	Reno, Nevada	
2023-01-08	Alon Foster (44)	Hispanic	Santa Clarita, California	
2023-01-08	Scotty Helton (53)	White	Mayflower, Arkansas	
2023-01-08	unidentified male	Unknown	Tustin, California	
2023-01-07	Tyre Nichols (29)	Black	Memphis, Tennessee	On January 7, Nichols was stopped by police for alleged reckless driving. (Note: On January 8, the Memphis Police Department said Nichols had been pulled over for reckless driving, but its chief later said that video recordings showed no evidence of probable cause for Nichols to be stopped (but stressed that cause may nonetheless have existed).) Officers pulled Nichols from his car and used pepper spray and a taser on him, after which he attempted to run away. When officers caught up with Nichols they punched and kicked him in the head and struck him on the back with a baton while restraining him; the beating continued for about three minutes. Afterwards, Nichols was taken to St. Francis Hospital where he died from his injuries on January 10. A preliminary autopsy commissioned by his family found that he had suffered "extensive bleeding caused by a severe beating".
2023-01-07	Jules Robert Lee (32)	Unknown	Statesboro, Georgia	Two deputies responded to a 911 call alleging that Lee assaulted his father. The officers deployed tasers in an attempt to arrest Lee, which did not work. Lee pulled a firearm and the deputies fired shots at him. Both officers were uninjured, while Lee later died at the hospital.
2023-01-07	Kenneth Hearne (37)	Black	Phoenix, Arizona	
2023-01-07	Robert Bradshaw (37)	Unknown	Fort Worth, Texas	
2023-01-07	Clinton Eli Burkhalter (42)	Unknown	Athens, Georgia	While investigating a stolen car, two ACCPD officers encountered two men in a shed. One of the men, Burkhalter, put a gun to his own head, then fired shots into the ceiling of the shed. When he began to exit the building, his gun was allegedly pointed at the officers, who then shot and killed him.
2023-01-06	Aaron Schwartz	Unknown	Watauga, Texas	
2023-01-06	Ray Dean King (50)	White	Hazel Green, Alabama	
2023-01-06	Nikolas Acosta (20)	Hispanic	Roswell, New Mexico	
2023-01-05	Christopher Walker (37)	Black	Fresno, California	Walker, a pedestrian, was struck and killed by a Fresno police vehicle as he crossed the street.
2023-01-05	Mark Capps (54)	White	Hermitage, Tennessee	Capps woke his wife and stepdaughter up and held them at gunpoint, threatening to kill them. After he fell asleep, the two escaped and called police. After a SWAT team arrived on his front porch, Capps opened the front door with a gun, and an officer shot him. Capps was a sound engineer who had previously won four Grammy Awards.
2023-01-05	Nicolas Micko (35)	Unknown	Lansing, Michigan	
2023-01-05	Brian Mummert (44)	Unknown	Laurie, Missouri	
2023-01-05	Jeremy Russell Stumpf (59)	Unknown	Frederick, Colorado	
2023-01-04	Sayed Faisal (20)	South Asian	Cambridge, Massachusetts	Police were called after Faisal, a junior at the University of Massachusetts Boston, was reported jumping out an apartment window with a knife, later determined to be a kukri. After being confronted by police while holding the kukri to his neck, Faisal allegedly moved towards officers with the kukri, leading an officer to shoot.
2023-01-04	Jose Iruegas (44)	Hispanic	San Antonio, Texas	
2023-01-04	Caleb Swafford (24)	Black	Houston, Texas	Swafford was standing in the street when he was struck by an officer responding to a non-emergency call.
2023-01-03	unidentified male	Hispanic	Phoenix, Arizona	
2023-01-03	Oscar Sanchez (35)	Hispanic	Los Angeles, California	Officers responded after Sanchez was reported throwing a knife and other objects at cars. Officers found Sanchez, holding a chain and makeshift spear, and spoke to him in English and Spanish. He entered an abandoned residence, and after following him up a flight of stairs, officers confronted and shot him. A utility knife was recovered from the scene.
2023-01-03	Keenan Anderson (31)	Black	Los Angeles, California	Anderson was restrained due to suspicion of a hit-and-run following a traffic collision and due to a witness testimony of an individual attempting to get in their car without their permission. Police ordered Anderson to sit down, which he initially did, but later Anderson ran away on a road, leading to police holding him down and tasing him six times in 42 seconds.
2023-01-03	Kenneth Dexter Watkins	White	Ridgecrest, California	
2023-01-03	unidentified male	Unknown	San Jacinto, California	
2023-01-02	Randy Tadlock (43)	White	Sulphur Springs, Texas	
2023-01-02	Lucas Gainforth (24)	White	East Lansing, Michigan	
2023-01-02	Jerry Preston (49)	White	Hazard, Kentucky	
2023-01-02	Aaron Swan Jr (28)	Black	Brackenridge, Pennsylvania	
2023-01-02	Lee Dawson Jr (68)	White	Lillington, North Carolina	
2023-01-02	Baltazar Rubio (43)	Unknown	Gridley, California	
2023-01-02	Takar Smith (45)	Black	Los Angeles, California	Police were called after Smith was reported to be in a woman's home, off his medication for schizophrenia, and holding a knife. After speaking to Smith for several minutes, Smith grabbed a knife from a counter but put it down when an officer pointed his gun at Smith. Smith then grabbed one of two bicycles placed between him and police, leading an officer to fire a stun gun. Smith then picked up the knife again. Police stunned Smith, then shot him when he briefly raised it above his head. LAPD Chief Michel Moore raised concerns over the officers and dispatcher not contacting a mental evaluation unit or mental assessment response team.
2023-01-01	unidentified male (32)	Unknown	Redlands, California	
2023-01-01	Mischa Fay (17)	White	Gilford, New Hampshire	
2023-01-01	Juan Nikely Avalo (33)	Unknown	Ranlo, North Carolina	Police responded to reports of a stabbing and shooting and found that an off-duty officer had shot a man, Avalo, after the officer was stabbed multiple times. The officer was later charged with first-degree murder.

== See also ==
- Death in custody § United States
- Henry A. Wallace Police Crime Public Database
- List of cases of police brutality
- List of countries with annual rates and counts for killings by law enforcement officers
- List of law enforcement officers killed in the line of duty in the United States
- List of law enforcement officers convicted for an on-duty killing in the United States
- List of police reforms related to the George Floyd protests
- List of unarmed African Americans killed by law enforcement officers in the United States
- Lists of killings by law enforcement officers
- Police brutality in the United States
- Police misconduct § United States
- Police riot § United States
- Police use of deadly force in the United States
