= Wendi C. Thomas =

American investigative journalist

- Born: Ohio, U.S.
- Education: Butler University
- Occupation: Journalist
- Known for: Founding MLK50

Wendi C. Thomas is an American investigative journalist and the founder of MLK50, a nonprofit digital newsroom with the goal of reporting on economic justice.

== Education ==
Thomas graduated from Butler University with a degree in journalism in 1993.

== Career ==
Thomas worked for The Commercial Appeal as a columnist from 2003 to 2014. In 2016, she was selected for the 2016 Class of the Nieman Fellowship at Harvard University. In 2017, Thomas founded MLK50: Justice Through Journalism to commemorate the 50th anniversary of the assassination of Martin Luther King Jr. In 2020, Thomas won the Selden Ring Award and the Gerald Loeb Award for local reporting for her reporting on predatory health care practices in Memphis.

== Lawsuits ==
Thomas was involved in a 2018 federal police surveillance trial, where the ACLU of Tennessee sued Memphis Police Department for violating a 1978 decree preventing them from surveilling on citizens for political purposes. A white police officer in the trial admitted to posing as a person of color on Facebook and following Black Lives Matter related groups and people to get intel on the movement, also admitting that Thomas was one of the people he followed.

In 2020, Thomas sued the city of Memphis for not including her in the city's media advisory list. Her lawyer claimed that it was unconstitutional for her to not be included and that they didn't include her because they "[did not] like the content of her reporting".
