= Cerelyn J. Davis =

13th Memphis police chief

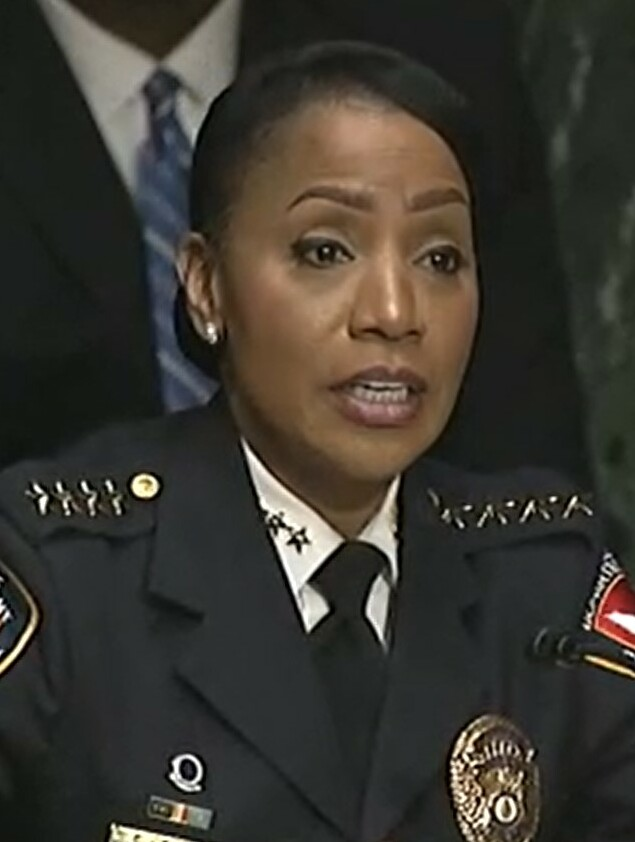
- Davis in 2020 Montgomery

13th chief of police of Memphis Police Department
- Incumbent
- Assumed office June 14, 2021
- Preceded by: Michael Rallings

Atlanta deputy chief of police
- In office February 2014 – June 6, 2016

Personal details
- Born: 1959 or 1960 Fort Bragg, North Carolina, U.S.
- Spouse: Terry Davis
- Children: 1
- Education: Saint Leo University; Central Michigan University; Northcentral University
- Website: Official website
- Nickname: C. J.

Cerelyn "C. J." Davis (born 1959 or 1960) is an American police officer who is the 13th director of police service for the Memphis Police Department. Davis is the first black woman to become the Memphis Police Department's chief. Shortly after accepting her job she required that her title be officially changed to police chief.

== Early life and education ==
Davis was born in Fort Bragg into a military family.

Davis has a degree in criminal justice from Saint Leo University. She graduated in 1998 after starting her studies at Georgia Military College; she has a master's degree in public administration from Central Michigan University.

== Career ==
Davis joined the Atlanta Police Department in 1986. In 2006 and 2007 she was Commander of the disbanded Red Dog unit; which used "aggressive crime fighting strategies in high crime areas citywide". She was demoted and then fired from the Atlanta Police Department in 2008 for her alleged involvement in a sex crimes investigation into the husband of an Atlanta police sergeant, according to The Atlanta Journal-Constitution. She was reinstated after an appeal process. In the same year O, The Oprah Magazine, named Davis as one of eighty women forming the O White House Leadership Project, Women Rule!. She became deputy chief of the Atlanta Police Department, and in 2016, became chief of the Durham Police Department in North Carolina . Davis has served as president of the National Organization of Black Law Enforcement Executives. In 2020, Davis appeared on Good Morning America calling for "sweeping changes and police reform" following the murder of George Floyd.

Davis was sworn in as the Memphis police chief in 2021. In 2021, she created the Street Crimes Operation to Restore Peace in Our Neighborhoods Unit (SCORPION); which is associated with killing of Tyre Nichols. She is the Memphis Police Department's first black female chief, and is also the first female police chief of Memphis.

In January 2023, Davis described the killing of Tyre Nichols as being a "defining moment" in the Memphis Police Department's history. She terminated the employment of five police officers associated with Nichols' death.

== Personal life ==
Davis is married; she has one daughter and two grandchildren.
