= Memphis Police Department =

Municipal police department in Tennessee, U.S.

Coordinates: 35.1496°N 90.0505°W

- Abbreviation: MPD

Agency overview
- Formed: 1827
- Employees: 1,950 (2022)
- Annual budget: $273 million (2020)

Jurisdictional structure
- Operations jurisdiction: Memphis, Tennessee, United States
- Jurisdiction of the Memphis Police Department
- Area: 816.0
- Population: 610,919 (2024)
- Legal jurisdiction: Memphis, Tennessee
- Governing body: Memphis City Council
- Constituting instrument: Yes
- General nature: Local civilian police

Operational structure
- Headquarters: 170 N. Main St., Memphis, TN 38103
- Officers: 2,058 (2019)
- Agency executives: Cerelyn "C. J." Davis, chief of police; Don Crowe, assistant chief of police
- Bureaus: 4: Administrative Services; Investigative Services; Special Operations; Uniform Patrol

Facilities
- Precincts: 9: Tillman Station (Central Precinct); North Main Station (Downtown Precinct); Appling Farms Station (Northeast Precinct); Crump Station (West Precinct); Mt. Moriah Station (East Precinct); Austin Peay Station (North Precinct/Austin Peay Hwy); Raines Station (South Precinct); Airways Station (Southeast Precinct); Ridgeway Station

Website
- Official website

The Memphis Police Department (MPD) is a law enforcement agency in Memphis, Tennessee, United States. Established in 1827, the MPD provides police services to the people of the Memphis in a 288 square miles (750 km^{2}) area with 2,081 officers.

== History ==
The Memphis Police Department was founded in 1827. In 1878, the 55-man police department was devastated by the yellow fever epidemic with all 55 officers stricken, and 10 officers dying. By 1927, the city's murder rate was 69.3 per 100,000 population, the highest in the country. In comparison, Chicago, then controlled by Al Capone, had a murder rate of only 13.3 per 100,000. Memphis police officers Thomas Waterson and Sergeant William Raney captured George "Machine Gun" Kelly in 1933. The first African American officers were hired in 1948, twenty years before the 1968 assassination of Martin Luther King Jr. in Memphis which sparked riots and curfews across the city. In 1973, the department witnessed the formation of two police unions—the Afro-American Police Association and the Memphis Police Association, a bargaining unit representing patrolmen and sergeants, and in 1978 the department went on strike in a labor dispute with city leaders.

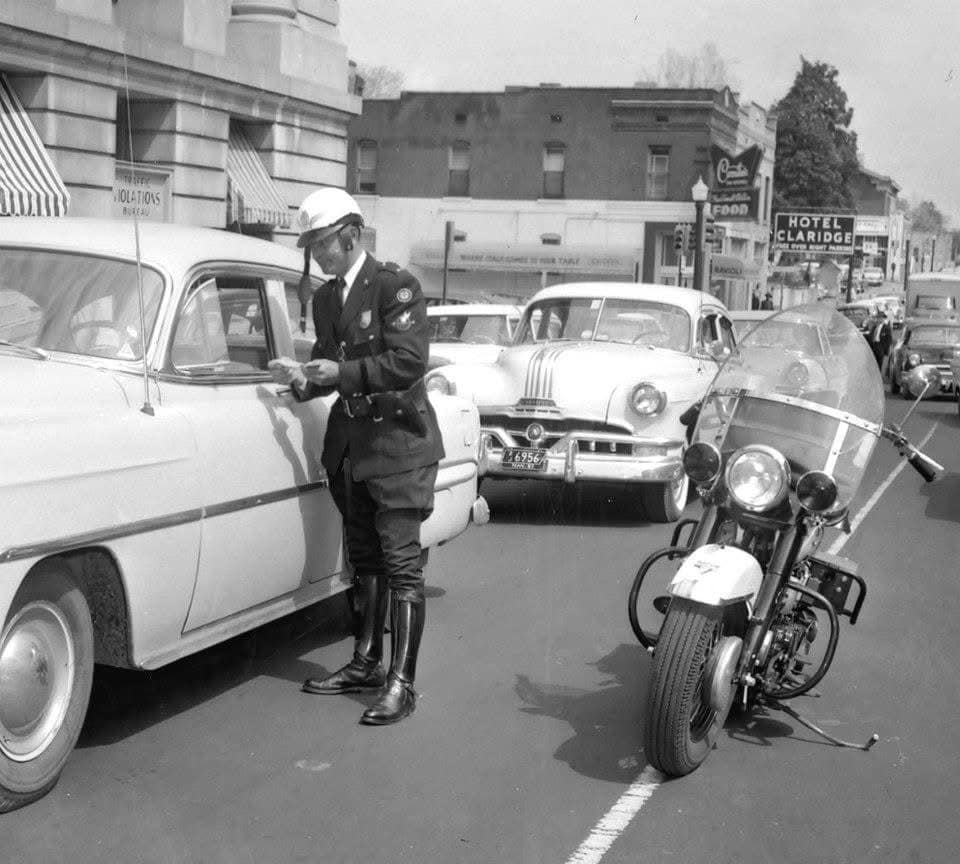
MPD officer in 1957

In 1979, the city admitted that written tests used in the police hiring and promotion process had a disparate impact on blacks. In 2002, a test used in the promotion process resulted in 31 percent of black candidates promoted, and 73 percent of whites. In 2006, a court ruled the 2002 test violated the Civil Rights Act of 1964, and "28 plaintiffs with passing exam scores and sufficient work experience were promoted". This decision would be reversed in 2014 by the United States Court of Appeals for the Sixth Circuit.

James Ivy became the city's first African-American police director in 1988. 1992 saw Eddie B. Adair named the first African American chief of police.

In 1992, Sergeant Jim Nichols, assigned to MPD Research & Development, formed a non-profit organization that raised money to allow MPD to become one of the first law enforcement agencies in Tennessee to utilize computers in a networks systems, where each detective, as well as the executive administration, had a computer on their desk to assist in writing up reports, running background checks, send and receive an email as well as other administrative needs relating to law enforcement.

In June 2013, Officer Brandon Berry was charged with forcing men to have sex with him in exchange for not arresting them on outstanding warrants. The next month officer Jason Webb was fired when he was charged with soliciting sex from an underage prostitute. In August 2013, Officer Vance Stacks was convicted of drunk driving and weapons charges related to a traffic accident in 2011. In September 2013, Officer Alex Beard plead guilty to reduced charges as a result of reckless behavior. In August 2012, while driving his official vehicle at more than ninety miles an hour without lights or a siren, he struck another car, killing a woman and her daughter. Beard was sentenced to six months in jail and six years on probation. In December 2013, Officer Matthew Ashmore was arrested after child pornography was found on his telephone.

In July 2014, hundreds of policemen called in sick apparently to protest the city reducing pay by 4.6 percent while giving millions of dollars to private entities. On July 5, 181 officers called in sick. The following Monday, 550 officers did not come to work. In late 2014, press reports indicated that the department had 11,000 untested rape kits on hand.

The current MPD headquarters at 170 North Main Street opened in 2017.

In 2018 due to a shortage of police officer staff and candidates, the requirement that newly-hired officers have a college degree was removed; officers were instead given four years to obtain a college degree after being hired. The Memphis Police Association opposed the change, saying "citizens deserve quality officers", and described the change as "lowering the standards". The same year, MPD was sued by the American Civil Liberties Union of Tennessee for violating a 1978 decree by surveilling on citizens for political purposes. White MPD Sergeant Timothy Reynolds admitted in the trial that he pretended to be a black man named "Bob Smith" on Facebook to spy on activists participating in the Black Lives Matter movement, one of them being journalist and founder of MLK50 Wendi C. Thomas. Judge Jon Phipps McCalla ruled that MPD was guilty of violating the decree.

In late 2020, retired African- American MPD Homicide Investigator Eric Kelly was charged with having a sexual relationship with a murder suspect.

In October 2021, MPD launched the SCORPION (street crimes operation to restore peace in our neighborhoods) specialized unit which targeted high-impact crimes and gang-related offenses. The unit had three teams totaling about 30 officers. The same year, the department appointed the first female and first African American Chief of Police, Cerelyn J. Davis. Also in 2021, Mayor Strickland's Advisory Council Reimagining Police report was released with recommendations. Following the killing of Tyre Nichols, the SCORPION unit was disbanded by Police Chief Davis in 2023, with Davis also terminating the employment of five associated officers.

On March 8, 2023, the United States Department of Justice (DOJ) announced that it would investigate the Memphis PD. In December 2024, the DOJ released a report concluding that the Memphis PD uses excessive force and discriminates against Black residents, finding that "Memphis police officers regularly violate the rights of the people they are sworn to serve."

== Organization ==
There are nine precincts in the Memphis area. The chief of police is appointed by the mayor and ratified by the city council.

The administrative services department provides services that enable the other programs to effectively respond to service calls. It provides security services; warrant, subpoena, and property processing; radio and telephone communications; inspection of police services; and management of information and human resources. Additional functions include the reporting and recording of crimes and incidents and personnel development.

The investigative services department includes the domestic violence bureau, the homicide, the missing person's bureau, the sex crimes/juvenile abuse bureau, the general investigative bureau, the felony response bureau, and support units.

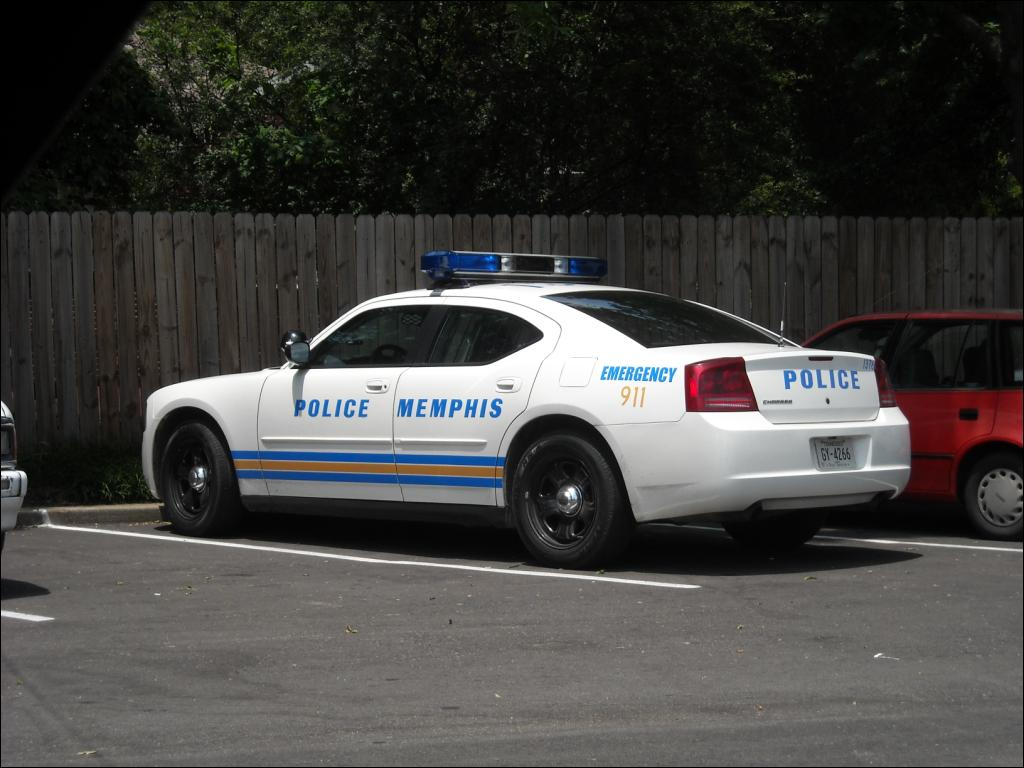
2007 Memphis Dodge Charger

Uniform patrol is divided into the geographic areas of Tillman Station (Central Precinct), North Main Station (Downtown Precinct), Appling Farms Station (Northeast Precinct), Crump Station (West Precinct), Mt. Moriah Station (East Precinct), Old Allen Station (North Precinct), Raines Station (South Precinct), Airways Station (Southeast Precinct), Ridgeway Station, and Union Station (Traffic Division).

Staff representation by race is 52 percent African American/Black, 47 percent White, and one percent Hispanic. 84 percent of staff are male, and 16 percent are female.

The standard-issued sidearm for MPD officers is the Glock 17 9mm as their new transition from SIG Sauer P229R DAK .40 S&W.

=== Rank structure and insignia ===
The Memphis Police Department uses these ranks:

Title	Insignia
Chief of Police	
Assistant Chief of Police	
Deputy Chief	
Colonel	
Lieutenant Colonel	
Major	
1st Lieutenant	
2nd Lieutenant	
Sergeant	
PIIP/PII/Detective	No Rank Insignia

== See also ==
- Crime in Memphis, Tennessee
- Gangs in Memphis, Tennessee
- List of law enforcement agencies in Tennessee
