= Gangs in Memphis, Tennessee =

Memphis, Tennessee serves as the Southern headquarters for Tennessee based street organizations in the Southern United States. In 2021, there were approximately 102 gangs with 13,400 gang members in the city.

Gangs in the Memphis area are concentrated in high crime black neighborhoods like College Park, Hollywood, Hickory Hill, Parkway Village, Westwood, Raleigh, Frayser, Orange Mound, Whitehaven, Binghampton, Klondike and Smokey City; their presence is also felt in the suburbs of Tipton County, Tennessee.

After a series of gang related robberies at Tom Lee Park on the river bluff in downtown Memphis, the Memphis Police Department said that "they often feel powerless to control these out-of-control teens." In May 2013, high school students warned Memphis City Schools against a proposed school merger of Booker T. Washington High School and Carver High School. "It's like putting the Crips and Bloods together in a national convention."

In 2013, Memphis City Council and Memphis Mayor A C Wharton cut funding for Blue CRUSH, the gang division of the Memphis Police Department.

== Sex trafficking ==
In 2013, the FBI arrested Gangster Disciples Folk Nation members on charges of sex trafficking and forced child prostitution.

== Neighborhoods ==
According to the Governor's Public Safety Forum on Tennessee Gangs, gangs operate in Memphis' rural communities like Millington, Mason, and, Northaven, and in low income neighborhoods of North Memphis, South Memphis, Raleigh, Frayser, Whitehaven, Binghampton, Orange Mound, Hickory Hill and Riverside.

== Infamous Memphis gang activity ==
- Craig Petties, half-brother of DJ Paul, was on the U.S. Marshals 15 Most Wanted Fugitives list before being captured in 2008. He was a member of the Gangster Disciples and allegedly the biggest drug dealer in the history of Memphis, getting drugs directly from Edgar Valdez Villarreal of the Beltrán-Leyva Cartel and funneling millions of dollars to the Black Mafia Family. In 2011, Petties pleaded guilty to 23 counts of violent crime and racketeering after working with the Sinaloa Cartel to build a drug trafficking empire in five states.
- In the 2008 Lester Street Massacre, a gruesome mass murder in Binghampton, Memphis, Jessie Dotson, a member of the Crips, killed his brother, Cecil Dotson, a member of the Gangster Disciples and his family.
- In 2010, Lorenzen Wright, a Memphis basketball star with a connection to drug kingpin Craig Petties, was found dead after being shot multiple times.
- In February 2013, the Grape Street Crips announced their partnership with Bradley Jenkins, the Imperial Wizard of the United Klan of America, a branch of the Ku Klux Klan in Atlanta, to protest in a planned rally in Memphis.
- In 2014, a mob of 100 to 125 teenagers attacked people at random in a Kroger parking lot during a knockout game-style challenge. They shouted "Fam Mob," the name of a Memphis-based gang. The incident was captured on video that went viral. Eleven people were arrested. According to the police, it was "a flash mob that got out of control."
- In 2015, the cousin of Shelby County Sheriff Bill Oldham was targeted in a carjacking robbery/homicide. On May 29, 2015, a group of Gangster Disciples murdered a recent graduate of Memphis University School. The perpetrators were being used as informants and were out on bail for previous armed robberies. No drugs were found on the scene. One perpetrator involved and later given a plea deal on second-degree murder presented at a local hospital with a gunshot wound, which went unreported to authorities. By Tennessee law, it is required to report gunshot wounds. In spoliation of evidence, the victim's car was sold illegally from the Memphis Police Department's impound. The Shelby County District Attorney at the time, Amy Weirich, recused herself as a cousin of the victim was an assistant in her office. A two-year undercover operation by the multi-unit task force known as Operation 38 Special had infiltrated the Gangster Disciples, who also had members in the police department. The multi-state operation was concluded on May 4, 2016.

== In mainstream culture ==
Music styles and artists that originated from Memphis gangsta rap culture include Young Dolph, Moneybagg Yo, Pooh Shiesty, Big30, Southern hip hop and crunk, made famous by 8 Ball & MJG, Three 6 Mafia, Project Pat, and Hypnotize Minds. In the 2000s, the music genre gained acceptance after winning an Academy Award for the song "It's Hard out Here for a Pimp" from Hustle & Flow.

== See also ==
- Crime in Memphis, Tennessee
