= Raleigh Springs Mall =

Former shopping mall

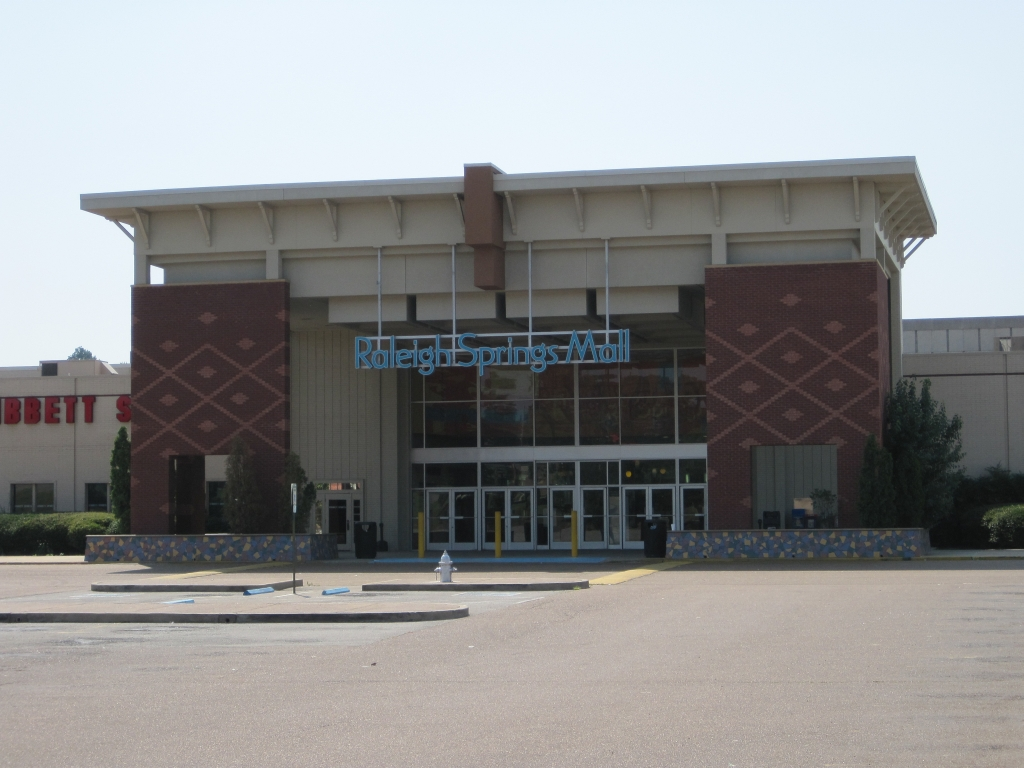
- Raleigh Springs Mall in 2010
- Location: Memphis, Tennessee, United States
- Coordinates: 35°13′9.141″N 89°54′30.2286″W
- Address: 3384 Austin Peay Hwy
- Opened: August 11, 1971
- Closed: November 18, 2016
- Developer: Edward J. DeBartolo Corporation
- Manager: Angela Whichard, Inc.
- Num. of stores: 70
- Num. of anchor tenants: 4 (4 vacant)
- Floor area: 918,217 square feet (85,305.2 m^{2})
- Floors: 3 including Dillard's but originally 1

The Raleigh Springs Mall was an enclosed shopping mall serving the city of Memphis, Tennessee, United States. The site is located on the north side of Memphis, on Austin Peay Hwy. just north of Interstate 40. It began construction in 1969 and opened two years later on August 11, 1971 as one of the city's first two shopping malls (the other being Southland Mall), owned and managed by the Edward J. DeBartolo corporation. The Raleigh Springs Mall originally featured about seventy stores and later featured a twelve-screen multiplex, with four anchor stores, formerly occupied by Sears, JCPenney, Goldsmith's and Dillard's. The theater closed in December 2011, Sears closed in April 2011, and the other three anchors closed in 2003. The mall property was won by the City of Memphis in multiple court challenges in favor to build a city Civic Center. The mall closed with 3 businesses operating at the time of closure: Citi Trends, World Diamond Center, and a church.

== History ==
When the Raleigh Springs Mall opened in 1971, it was located between Austin Peay Highway and Yale Road in northeastern Shelby County, in the Raleigh community, what was then outside of Memphis. The mall was developed by the Edward J. DeBartolo Corporation (now known as Simon Property Group) as one of the first two malls in the Memphis area, it featured four major anchor stores: national chains JC Penney and Sears, as well as local chains Lowenstein's (which was sold to Dillard's in 1982) and Goldsmith's. A Woolworth dime store also served as a junior anchor next to JC Penney; after the Woolworth store closed in the 1990s, it was replaced with a twelve-screen multiplex (that closed December 5, 2011).

Initially the dominant mall in the Memphis area, Raleigh Springs Mall would lose several stores over time as newer malls opened, such as Hickory Ridge Mall and Mall of Memphis. Hickory Ridge Mall, in turn, has lost most of its national tenants as well, while Mall of Memphis has been demolished; both of these malls lost most of their business to the newer Wolfchase Galleria, which opened in 1997.

By the 2000s, Raleigh Springs Mall had begun to lose many of its tenants. In early 2003, Dillard's announced that its location at Raleigh Springs Mall would be one of several stores closed that year. Goldsmith's parent company Federated Department Stores (now known as Macy's, Inc.), who was in the midst of significant corporate reorganization at the time, announced that the Goldsmith's location at Raleigh Springs would be shuttered by April of the same year. Finally, the JC Penney store (which had been downgraded to a JC Penney outlet center along with Dillard's) was closed as well, leaving Sears as the only anchor store.

Starting in 2005, Wal-Mart began negotiations with Simon Property Group to open a Supercenter at the mall. These plans would call for the demolition of the former JC Penney space, as well as the mall's movie theater, to make way for the Supercenter. However, these plans never materialized, and Wal-Mart signaled its intentions of staying at its current location when it started renovating it in early 2010.

In January 2011, Sears confirmed that its location in the mall would close on April 3, 2011. This left the Raleigh Springs Mall without an anchor store.

== Demolition and redevelopment ==
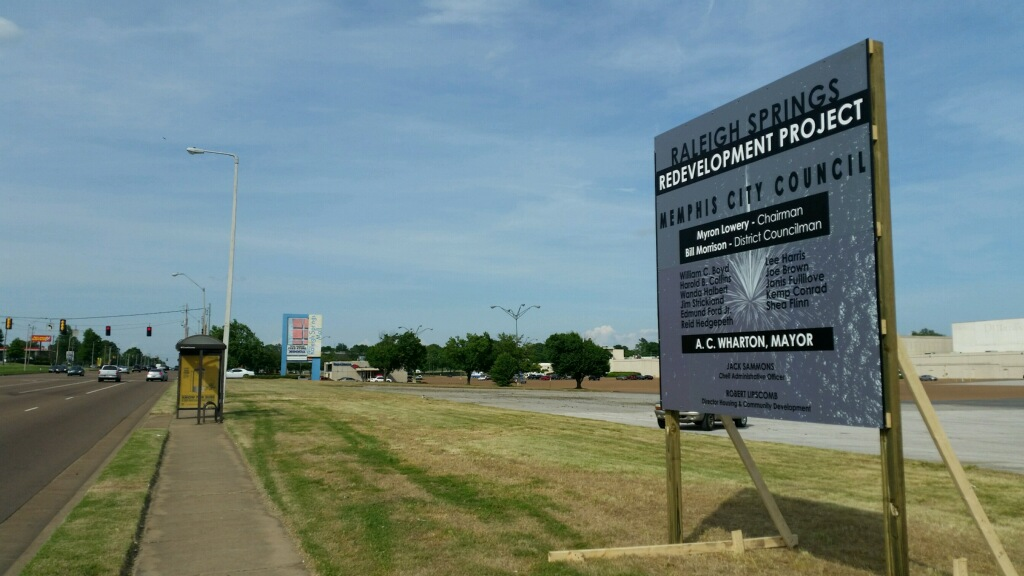
Redevelopment sign in front of Raleigh Springs Mall in 2015

In November 2016, the City of Memphis purchased the Raleigh Springs Mall property, making way for a complete demolition and redevelopment of the space into a town center with a library, Memphis Police Department precinct, and skatepark around a detention pond. The City of Memphis plans to spend approximately $32 million in capital to create a civic plaza consolidating city services that were previously held at various locations. The mall started closing November 18, 2016. The Raleigh Springs Civic Center houses an 11-acre lake, green space, and 1-mile walking trail. The new library and precinct buildings were designed by O.T. Marshall Architects. Construction started in 2017, with a projected opening of fall 2020. Construction on the library slowed down due to the COVID-19 pandemic, with other portions of the site opening in early 2020. The official ribbon cutting ceremony occurred on November 19, 2020.
