= Christ Community Health Services =

Non-profit healthcare provider in Tennessee, U.S.

- Christ Community Health Services
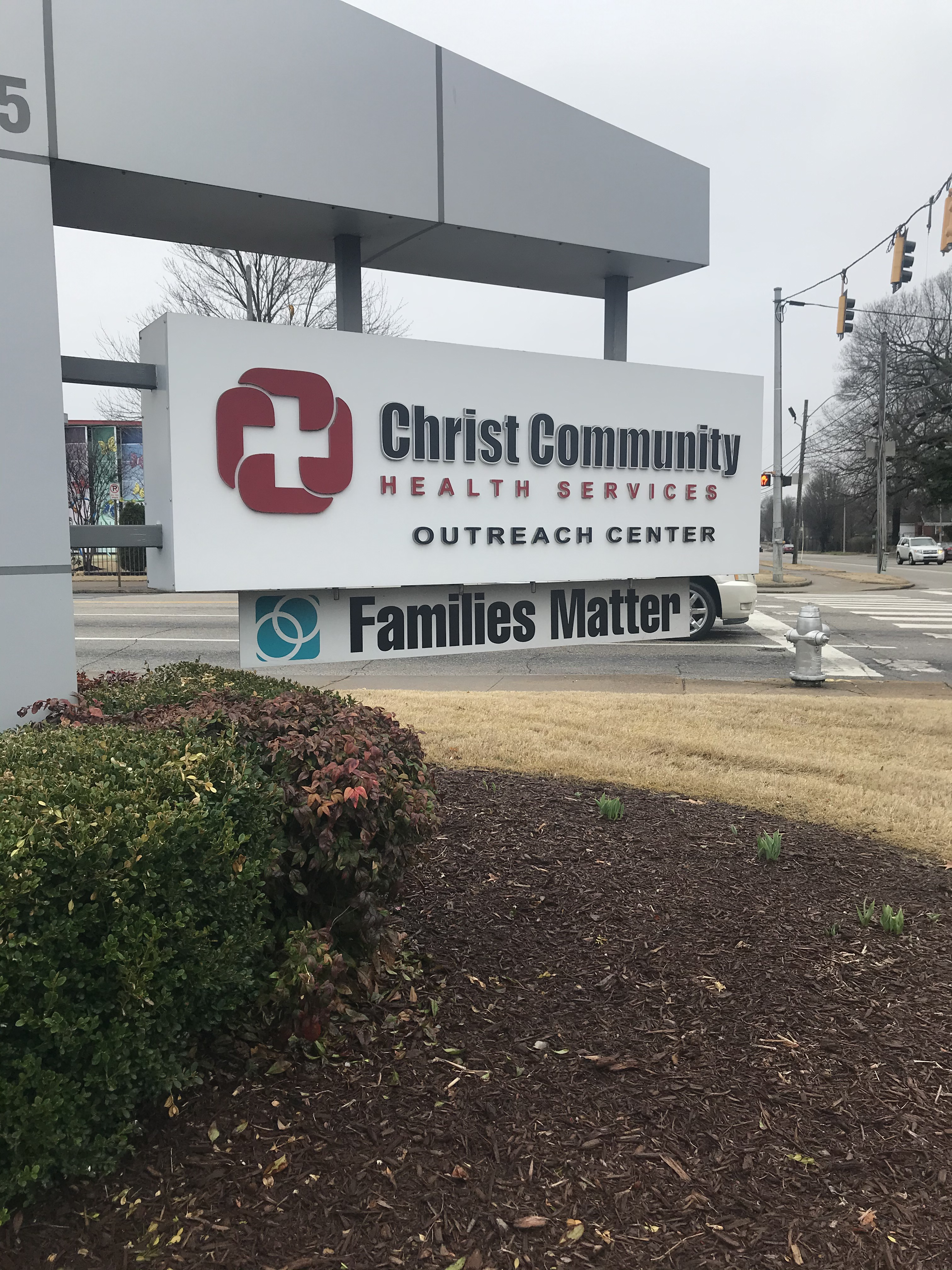
- Sign outside the Christ Community Health Services administration building
- Abbreviation: Christ Community/Christ Community Health/CCHS
- Formation: 1995
- Type: Federally Qualified Health Center/Nonprofit Organization
- Purpose: Healthcare for the uninsured and poor
- Headquarters: Memphis, Tennessee, U.S.
- Services: Primary healthcare, dentistry, mental health, spiritual health, down syndrome care, HIV care, pre-natal care.
- Leader: Shantelle Leatherwood
- Budget: $46 million per year
- Staff: 415 employees
- Website: www.christcommunityhealth.org

Christ Community Health Services, often referred to as Christ Community, or Christ Community Health, is a nonprofit, Christian, faith-based, healthcare provider with several locations across the Memphis, Tennessee area founded in 1995. Christ Community Health Services is officially classified as a federal qualified health center (FQHC). Christ Community Health Services aims at providing affordable healthcare to the homeless and low-income individuals in communities throughout Memphis. Dental care, physical care, and counselling are some of the several services provided by Christ Community. Shantelle Leatherwood is the current chief executive officer of Christ Community Health. In 2011, Christ Community Health Services was involved in a family planning controversy with nonprofit organization Planned Parenthood in which Christ Community replaced Planned Parenthood as the contract holder for free, family planning services in Memphis. Christ Community Health Services has also aided the Memphis community during the COVID-19 pandemic by providing free COVID-19 testing as well as COVID-19 vaccines.

== History ==
Christ Community Health Services was founded in 1995 in Memphis, Tennessee by four doctors, Rick Donlon, David Pepperman, Karen Miller, and Steven Besh. With a budget of around $46 million a year Christ Community Health Services employs a variety of health care workers ranging from dentists, doctors, pharmacists and behavioral health experts; total employment at Christ Community Health Services is 415.

In 2009, Christ Community Health Services had a total of one mobile clinic, and five permanent locations. As a result of high healthcare demand among low-income homeless individuals Christ Community Health Services has expanded over time. Today, Christ Community Health has more than ten locations in poorer areas throughout the Memphis area.

In 2017 Shantelle Leatherwood became the chief executive officer for Christ Community Health Services, succeeding Ed Robertson. Leatherwood remains the current chief executive officer.

In 2019, Christ Community Health Services received a $50,000 grant from United Healthcare. The grant was specifically aimed at enhancing Christ Community Health's dental care for uninsured students, the homeless, and pregnant women. Also in 2019, Christ Community Health Services partnered with the American Heart Association and a local Memphis non-profit organization called Fish-N-Loaves to create a food initiative called "Healthy Frayser" based in Frayser, Memphis. Healthy Frayser aims to feed the local Frayser community healthy and nutritious food.

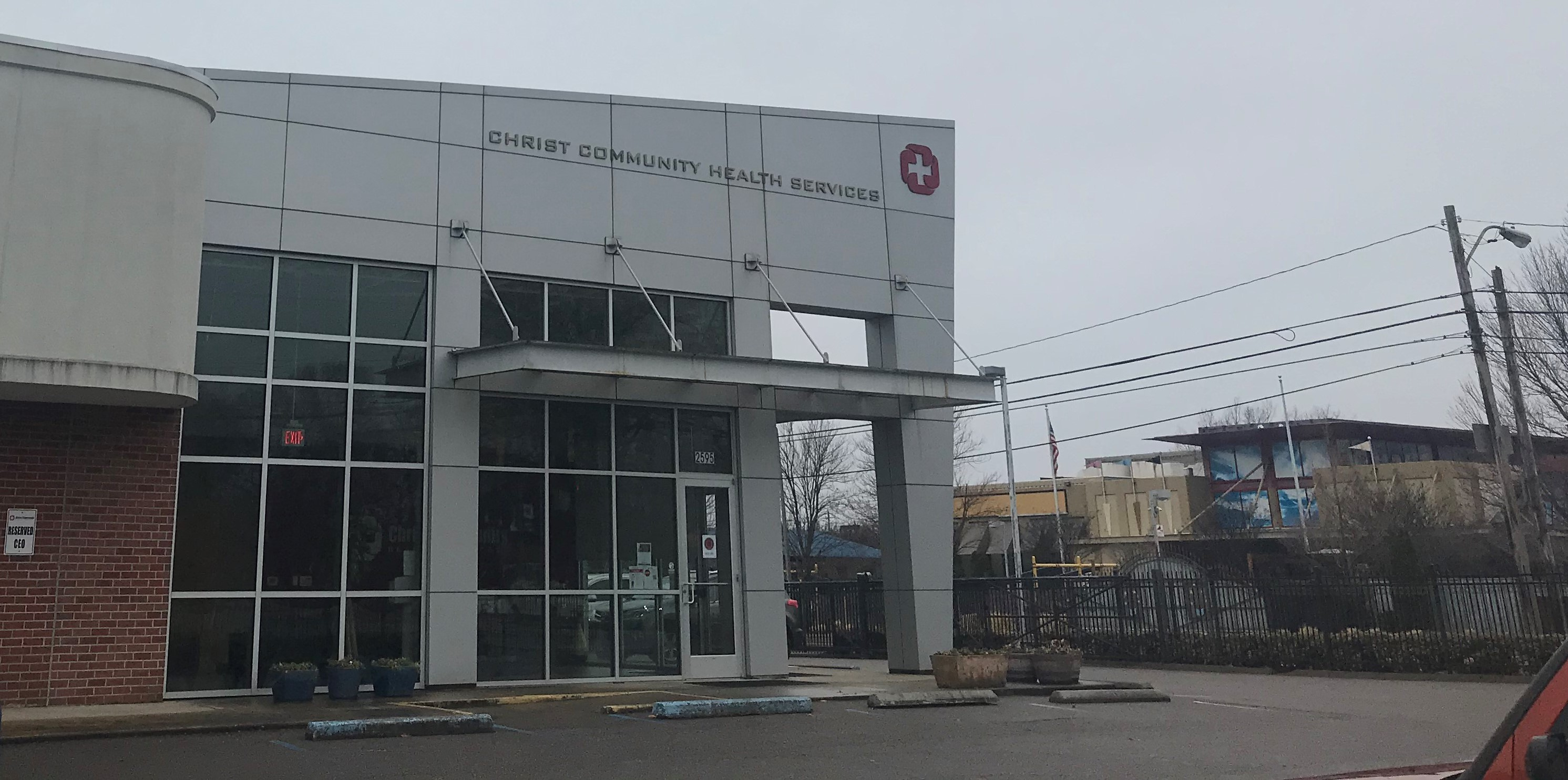
The Christ Community Health Services administration building in Memphis, Tennessee.

In 2020, Christ Community Health Services announced a plan to transform an old shopping mall into a new health center. The building is expected to include a counseling center, exam rooms, a dentil clinic and a behavioral unit. Additionally, in late 2020, Tennessee governor Bill Lee awarded Christ Community Health Services the award of excellence for work in the community. As a result of the 2020 COVID-19 pandemic, Christ Community Health Services opened up free COVID-19 testing.

== Expansion ==
=== Underserved and International Track ===
On July 1, 2011, Christ Community Health Services partnered with the University of Tennessee Health Science Center to create a training program called, "The Underserved and International Track". The program was designed to educate medical graduate students on how to treat poor and vulnerable populations' health needs both in the United States and in other countries throughout the world. The Underserved and International Track program lasted three years.

=== Frayser expansion ===
In 2013 Christ Community Health Services received a $5 million grant to purchase a four-acre (1.6 ha), vacant, unused lot in the Frayser area in Memphis. The lot was transformed into a new health clinic which included a dental center as well as a pharmacy. The expansion came in response to issues of understaffing and a lack of health facilities.

=== Women's Health Center ===
Christ Community Health Services opened up a Women's Health Center in an office space in Memphis in 2013. The center was designed to provide women's health resources to particularly women of color who tend to have a lack of health resources in the Memphis community. Biopsies, pre-natal care, and contraceptives are among the several services that the Women's Health Center provides. One of the main goals of the Women's Health Center is to steer women away from aborting their pregnancies. The estimated cost of this center was around $250,000.

=== Raleigh Health Center ===
In 2016, Christ Community Health Services built a $2.5 million health center in the Raleigh neighborhood in Memphis. The land used for the health center was an old shopping mall. The center was built in response to a lack of healthcare facilities in the Raleigh neighborhood. The Raleigh Health Center is primarily a dental care facility.

=== Clinic for the homeless ===
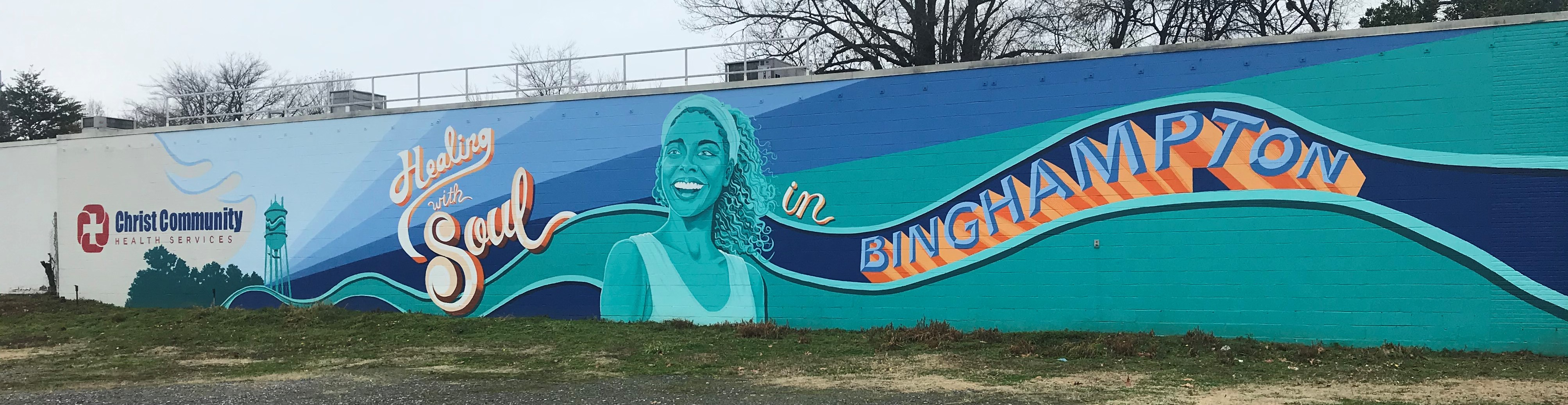
A mural painted on the side of a Christ Community Health Services dental clinic in Memphis, Tennessee.

In 2019, Christ Community Health Services continued its expansion by partnering with Baptist Health to open a clinic for the homeless. Prior to this permanent location, the clinic for the homeless was a mobile clinic in a van. The clinic includes two exam rooms, as well as offices for staff.

== Family planning controversy ==
In October 2011, a controversy arose within the local Shelby County Commission concerning a contract allowing for a health organization to provide family planning services to the poor. At the time, the current contract holder was Planned Parenthood. However, Christ Community Health Services was elected by the Shelby County Commission to potentially replace Planned Parenthood as the contract holder. On Wednesday, October 12, 2011, the commission's vote was deadlocked with five votes in favor of granting Christ Community Health the contract and five votes against the act. Proponents of giving Christ Community the contract argued that Christ Community had a stronger local presence and had more facilities than Planned Parenthood. However, opponents of handing the contract over to Christ Community argued that since Christ Community refused to both provide abortion services and give referrals to abortion facilities, then the contract should not be given to Christ Community.

Five days after the deadlock vote, the Shelby County Commission voted in favor of Christ Community with a majority nine votes for, and five votes against. The decision caused a large local controversy and many local citizens spoke out against the decision. After the decision, Planned Parenthood filed a formal protest against the Shelby County Commission. Because Planned Parenthood lost its contract to provide its family planning services cost-free to Christ Community, Planned Parenthood had to provide their services at a cost.

== COVID-19 ==
Christ Community Health Services expanded their services to include COVID-19 testing and vaccinations in response to the COVID-19 pandemic. In March, 2020 during the early stages of the COVID-19 pandemic, Christ Community established one of the first free COVID-19 drive-thru testing sites in the Memphis area. The site was initially established to only to test individuals who had recently travelled, who had exposure to COVID-19, or who had COVID-19 symptoms.

By April, 2020, Christ Community Health more intensely focused on healthcare for those who had become unemployed as a result of the COVID-19 pandemic. Christ Community established appointments over phone instead of in-person appointments to prevent the spread of the coronavirus. Christ Community also increased screening for depression and anxiety in response to an increase in mental health patients.

By December, 2020 Christ Community Health Services had tested over 35,000 people for COVID-19. Also during this time Christ Community announced that its resources had been put under significant strain during the pandemic. As a result, Christ Community asked the local Memphis community for donations during the holiday season.

In early February 2021, Christ Community Health Services, along with three other local health organizations, was approved to distribute the COVID-19 vaccine to Memphis residents. Christ Community Health received 400 doses of the vaccine and announced that they would be distributing the vaccine firstly to Christ Community Health patients who were 75 years of age or older.
