= Raleigh, Memphis =

- Community
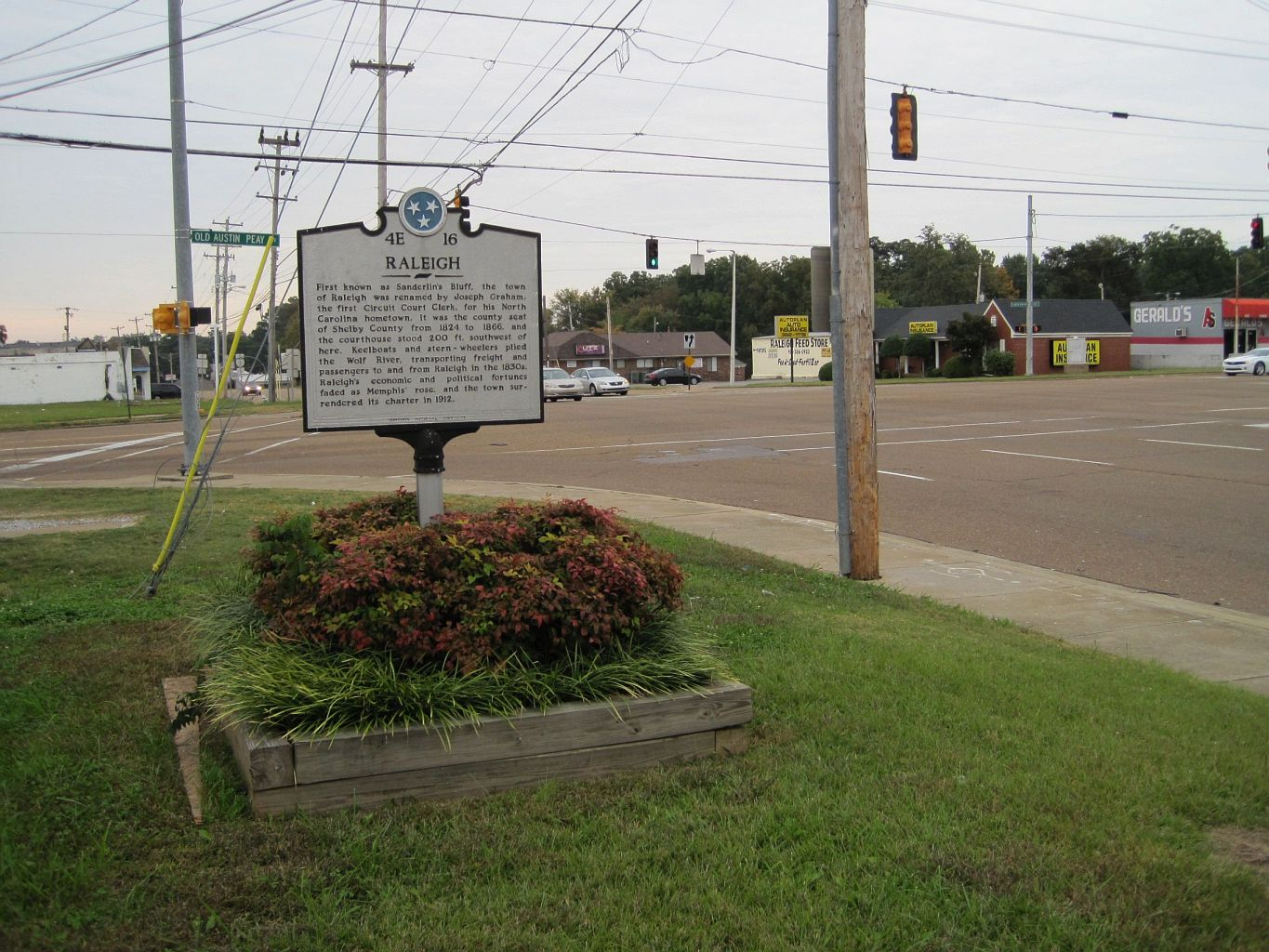
- A historical marker near Austin Peay Highway in Raleigh.

- Location within Tennessee Location within the United States
- Coordinates: 35.207°N 89.922°W
- Country: United States
- State: Tennessee
- County: Shelby
- Settled: 1824

Area
  - Total: 22.66 sq mi (58.7 km^{2})
- Elevation: 260 ft (80 m)
- ZIP Code: 38128
- Area code: 901

Raleigh is a community in north-central Memphis, Tennessee, United States, named for a formerly incorporated town that used to be at its center. Raleigh is bordered on the west by the community of Frayser (the boundary being the north–south Canadian National Railway tracks, which formed the Memphis city limits until 1975), on the east by the incorporated suburb of Bartlett, on the south by the Wolf River and Interstate 40, and on the north by the Memphis city limits. The former town of Raleigh was the first county seat of Shelby County, Tennessee.

== Geography ==
Situated along a high bluff on the Wolf River, Raleigh is one of the highest points in the Memphis area. The old town's center, which was located around the intersection of today's James Road/Stage Road and Old Austin Peay Highway, had a commanding view of the river. Mary Winslow Chapman in her 1977 memoir I Remember Raleigh, provided these vivid descriptions of the Wolf River in its natural state (before channelization):

To form any picture of [the river's environs] we must forget what we now see and imagine the Wolf as it was then, a clear, spring-fed stream slipping silently along through the endless forest, where the unbroken shade shielded it from the fierce Southern sunshine and kept it flowing fresh and cool all summer long... The water was fresh and sweet, flowing out of the uncontaminated woods, but gradually this condition changed. As more and more land upstream was cultivated, more silt was washed into the river. After each rain it took longer for the stream to clear, and finally, with the establishment of the Penal Farm [today's Shelby Farms] with all its disagreeable effluvia, swimming became impossible... Gone now forever from this spot are the cane brake and the horses; the tall timber and the mysterious river, where hard by, on Austin Peay Bridge auto traffic streams triumphant, night and day in one unceasing roar, all oblivious of the life and history buried down below.

== History ==
Formerly an incorporated city, Raleigh was the county seat of Shelby County from 1824 to 1866, when the county courts were moved to Memphis, which had outstripped Raleigh in growth. In 1912, the town surrendered its charter and returned to unincorporated status.

The town was named by Joseph Graham, the first circuit clerk of the county, who was from the Raleigh, North Carolina area. The stone courthouse was situated between James and Fayette roads; a warehouse was later built on the site at 4216 Fayette Road. After the town lost its status as county seat in 1866, the courthouse was dismantled and the stone was used to construct the courthouse in nearby Bartlett, which had incorporated that same year.

Raleigh Cemetery, on Old Raleigh-Lagrange Road, is the final resting place of many of the area's early settlers, such as the Colemans, the Burrows, the second mayor of Memphis, Isaac Rawlings, and relatives of Isaac Shelby, the county's namesake. This cemetery was founded in the 1840s.

=== Annexation ===
On January 1, 1973, Raleigh was annexed by the City of Memphis. The northern part of Raleigh was annexed by the City of Memphis under an ordinance signed in November 2005. However, the area was proposed for de-annexation, but it was dropped in early 2018.

== Economy ==
With the exception of the largest Nike distribution center in the world on New Frayser-Raleigh Road, Raleigh's business community is almost exclusively retail. The two main commercial corridors are Covington Pike and Austin Peay Highway, which meet at a major intersection that includes Methodist North Healthcare Hospital on one corner and a Walmart Supercenter and other businesses on the other.

The southern section of Covington Pike comprises Memphis's largest collection of automobile dealerships and related businesses. The area around Stage Road offers fast food and casual restaurants, shopping centers, and major retailers such as Home Depot. Austin Peay Highway likewise is crowded with fast food and casual restaurants, shopping centers, grocery stores, and Raleigh Springs Mall, which was the community's commercial center from its opening in 1971 into the 1990s. It later struggled to retain tenants because of competition from Wolfchase Galleria. In 2016 the City of Memphis bought up the mall to build the Raleigh Springs Civic Center. The Civic Center houses a public library, police station, traffic and special operations station, and skatepark.

== Education ==
Most of Raleigh's public schools are in the Shelby County Schools district; two elementary schools and one middle school are in the Achievement School District. Public elementary schools include Brownsville Road Elementary, Egypt Elementary, Raleigh-Bartlett Meadows Elementary, and Scenic Hills Elementary. Raleigh has one public middle school, the Memphis Academy of Health Sciences, and two middle and high schools, Raleigh-Egypt High School and Craigmont High School.

Charter schools include two elementary schools in the Achievement School District, Journey Coleman, Promise Academy Spring Hill, and Memphis Rise Middle and High Schools.
