= James Antonio Barnes =

American serial killer (born 1944)

- Born: April 27, 1944 (age 82); Detroit, Michigan, U.S.
- Other names: James Antonio Burns; James Barnes II; Alfred Marcellus Jackson
- Status: Released
- Convictions: Second degree murder (3 counts); Bank robbery
- Penalty: 40 years imprisonment

Details
- Victims: 3–7
- Span of crimes: August 15 – October 31, 1988
- Country: United States
- States: Tennessee, possibly Michigan
- Date apprehended: November 10, 1988

James Antonio Barnes (born April 27, 1944) is an American serial killer who attacked five prostitutes around Memphis, Tennessee from August to November 1988, killing three and wounding two others in what he claimed to be orders from his other personalities. Although considered a suspect in a total of seven killings, he was only convicted of his confirmed crimes and sentenced to 40 years imprisonment.

== Early life ==
Little is known about Barnes' early life. Born on April 27, 1944, in Detroit, Michigan, he was regularly mistreated by his alcoholic parents, with Barnes claiming that his mother had attempted to miscarry by ingesting a quantity of drugs. In another instance, he had been put in a sack and lowered into a well as punishment for misbehaving. He started exhibiting signs of mental illness early in his life, and had to be treated for depression, hallucinations, and drug abuse in various institutions around Michigan, Tennessee, and Missouri. In between these treatments, Barnes committed a variety of petty crimes, with his most notable conviction being for a bank robbery committed in Detroit.

After being released from prison, Barnes found employment as a factory worker for a General Motors plant, but was laid off after company sales went down. Left without a home or any close living relatives, he decided to move to Memphis, Tennessee, settling in the Knightwoods neighborhood of Parkway Village.

== Murders ==
From August to November 1988, Barnes would attack at least five prostitutes (three women and two male transvestites) around various neighborhoods in Memphis - three of these resulted in fatalities. His modus operandi consisted of selecting suitable victims from Fourth and Vance Avenue, whom he would pick up in his gray Hyundai and drive to isolated areas, where he would then shoot them multiple times with a .32 caliber automatic pistol.

His first confirmed victim was 25-year-old Sharon Denise Moore, who was found shot to death on Weakley Street on August 15. On October 7, police charged 39-year-old Larry Eugene Ward with second-degree murder in this case, as he had recently been arrested for assault with intent to commit first-degree murder in an unrelated incident. Ward had fired at a patrolman with a shotgun when the officer tried to stop him for driving without headlights and was arrested after crashing his pickup truck, and due to his proximity to where Moore's body was found, he was considered the prime suspect in the case.

On October 5, Barnes picked up 28-year-old Loria Ann Deberry, then drove to Carolina and Hernando, where he subsequently shot her to death. On October 25, he picked up 23-year-old Tony Lee Thompson and drove to 421 South Parkway West, where he shot him - the wounds proved to be non-fatal, and Thompson survived. Six days later, Barnes picked up 37-year-old Joyce M. Thomas, whose bullet-riddled body was found in a field north of 295 West Peebles that very same day.

The last confirmed attack occurred on November 5, when Barnes picked up 30-year-old Eric Lewis from Fourth and Vance Avenue. He then drove to the rear of 674 South Main, where he shot at him with his pistol - like Thompson before him, Lewis' injuries proved non-fatal and he survived the attack.

== Arrest and confessions ==
Following the murder of Thomas, the Memphis Police Department formed a special task force to investigate the recent killings, which predominantly focused on interviewing various people for potential incriminating information. A major break came right after the attack on Lewis, when a witness claimed that they had marked down the license plate of the car that had picked up Lewis - when examined, it was revealed to be a gray Hyundai belonging to Barnes that matched the description of the supposed offender's car seen in some of the other attacks. Several officers were then tasked with keeping watch of Barnes, and on November 10, he was arrested after a short car chase. The arresting officers saw him throw out a pistol during the chase, and when ballistic tests were performed on it, it was established that it was the same .32 pistol used in all five attacks.

Barnes was placed in the Shelby County Jail to await further charges, and in that time, both Thompson and Lewis positively identified him as their assailant. During interrogations, he willingly admitted guilt in the murders, including that of Moore - after his admission, the second-degree murder charges against Larry Ward were dropped and he was cleared of suspicion in that case. Authorities also announced that they were probing whether Barnes could be responsible for other crimes, specifically in the murders of two other prostitutes in Memphis and another two in his native Detroit in the months preceding the attacks. No additional charges were filed in these cases, and it is unclear if they were ever solved and if Barnes remains a suspect in them.

=== Debate on mental health ===
When asked what his motive for the murders was, Barnes claimed that he had been overcome with "a feeling" that made him feel cold and numb, and that it could only be relieved when he killed those he considered to be the "vermin of the Earth". Throughout his custody and during his trial, he exhibited increasingly bizarre behavior, such as bobbing his head side to side, dozing off then waking up and shouting, and finally going into crazed tantrums. This led some to believe that he suffered from multiple personality disorder, which had only recently been accepted as an illness and there was ongoing debate about its validity, prompted from the prosecution of Sedley Alley for the 1985 murder of Suzanne Marie Collins. Barnes' contended that one of his at least five different personalities had committed the crime, leading his defense attorneys to petition the court to rule him incompetent to stand trial. This suggestion was criticized by prosecutors, who insisted that Barnes was only pretending and had even bragged about successfully fooling the courts after a psychiatric evaluation - due to this, they sought the death penalty against him.

After an initial psychiatric evaluation ruled him competent to stand trial, Barnes' defense attorneys hired Dr. George B. Greaves to examine him. Greaves, an Atlanta-based psychiatrist who specialized in cases with multiple personality disorder, proceeded to review all of his medical records, videotapes of conversations held with his attorneys and personally interviewed Barnes on two separate occasions. From his observations, he concluded that Barnes did indeed suffer from the disease, claiming that he had identified 12 distinct personalities with separate body language, mannerisms and facial expressions. During a court hearing, he described how Barnes was very cooperative, but at one point began acting unusually happy and stated that he would be rescued by a flying saucer that would beam him up and fly off with him. Greaves also rejected claims that Barnes was faking it, noting that the diagnostic signs were too subtle and that Barnes was "clearly not a professional actor".

In light of these findings, Barnes was detained in various mental health institutions until 1996, when it was finally ruled that even though he was indeed mentally ill, he understood the nature of his crimes and was thus eligible to stand trial.

== Trial, imprisonment, and status ==
With his trial scheduled for September 1997, Barnes unexpectedly made guilty pleas on all three counts. As part of a plea deal with prosecutors, the death penalty was dropped, the charges were reduced to second degree murder and he was instead sentenced to 40 years imprisonment with a chance of parole after serving 16 years. Barnes was then transferred to the Lois M. DeBerry Special Needs Facility in Nashville, where he would remain under treatment until he served out his sentence. According to the Tennessee Department of Correction, Barnes was released from prison on April 10, 2016.

== See also ==
- List of serial killers in the United States
