= Hickory Hill, Memphis =

Neighborhood of Memphis, Tennessee

Coordinates: 35.0499°N 89.8657°W

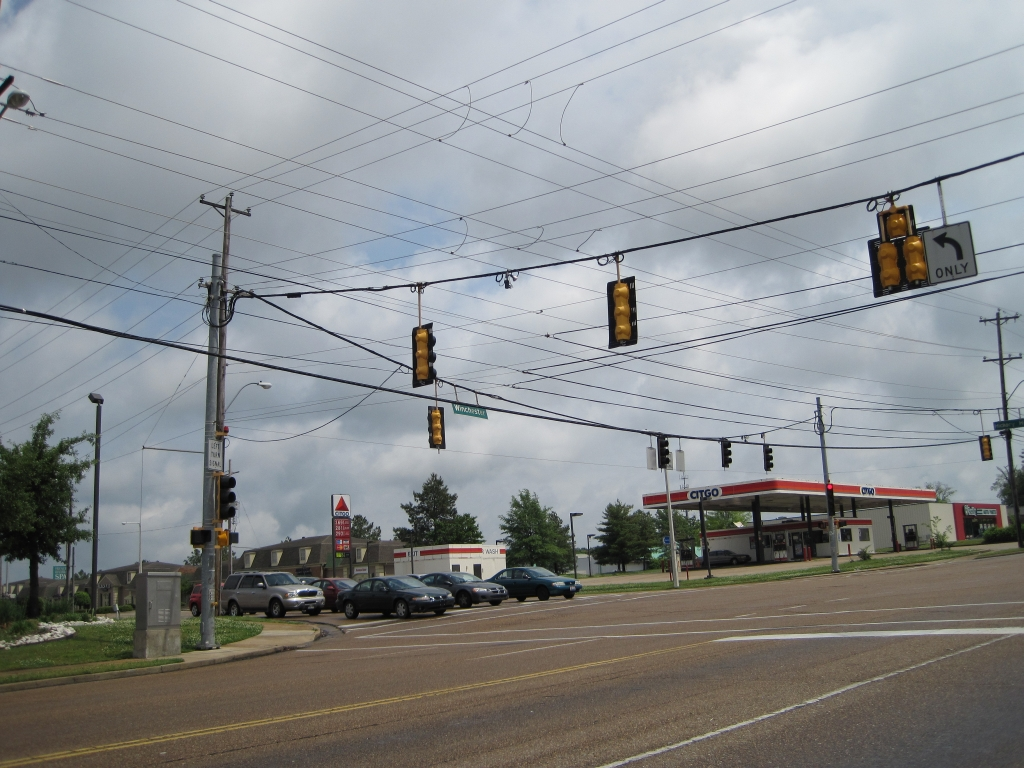
Winchester Road in Hickory Hill

Hickory Hill is a middle-class, predominantly African American community in the southeast region of Memphis, Tennessee, United States.

== History ==
In the 1950s, Hickory Hill was a rural community just southeast of Memphis, with some paved roads and less than a 1,000 homes were available in the area.

A mass shooting took place in 2025, where 4 children were injured.

== Geography ==
The neighborhood is bounded on the north by where Bill Morris Parkway (385) meets Kirby, and the community of Fox Meadows (or Winchester Road), on the east by Riverdale Road, on the south by Holmes Road and Shelby Drive, and on the west by Mendenhall Road and/or the community of Parkway Village.

== Demographics ==
The neighborhood experienced a dramatic demographic change after being annexed by the city of Memphis on Thursday, December 31, 1998. According to the Census Bureau, the Black population increased dramatically by more than 450 percent between 1990 and 2000. The white population dropped 50 percent over this same period. The Hispanic population in Hickory Hill has increased nearly 700 percent over the past decade. According to the 2010 Census the two zip codes 38141 and 38115 that make up Hickory Hill were both 80% Black, 10% to 11% Hispanic (mostly Mexican), 8% White and 1% Asian. The median income for zip code 38141 was $56,000 and the mean income was $60,672. For 38115 zip code The median income was $34,603 and the mean income was $47,369. The percentage adults in Hickory Hill with a high school education is higher than either the city or the county by 5-10 percent. More than one in four adults have a bachelor's degree or higher which is equal to the county rate and higher than the city rate.

== Places ==
- Hickory Ridge Mall
