= Jesse Turner =

Jesse Turner may refer to:

- Jesse Lee Turner, American singer
- Jesse H. Turner Sr., civil rights leader for whom Jesse H Turner Park is named
- Jesse Turner, student kidnapped by Islamic Jihad for the Liberation of Palestine
- Jesse Turner, 2008 Grammy nominee
- Jesse Turner, state senator in Arkansas 1866-1867

== See also ==
- Jessie Franklin Turner, designer
