= Frayser =

Frayser can refer to:

- Frayser, Memphis
- Frayser's Farm
- Frayser Boy
