= Goldsmith's =

Department store in Memphis, Tennessee

- Type: Department store
- Industry: Retail
- Founded: 1870
- Defunct: 2005
- Fate: Merged with Macy's
- Headquarters: Memphis, Tennessee
- Products: Clothing, footwear, bedding, furniture, jewelry, beauty products, and housewares.

Goldsmith's was a department store founded in Memphis, Tennessee, in 1870 by German immigrant brothers Jacob and Isaac Goldsmith. It grew into a chain largely located in the Memphis metropolitan area, until 2005, when the nameplate was eliminated and replaced by Macy's. Goldsmith's stores were subsequently folded into Federated's Macy's Central division, reorganized into Macy's South, and today into a differently configured Macy's Central, the current division encompassing the stores.

== History ==
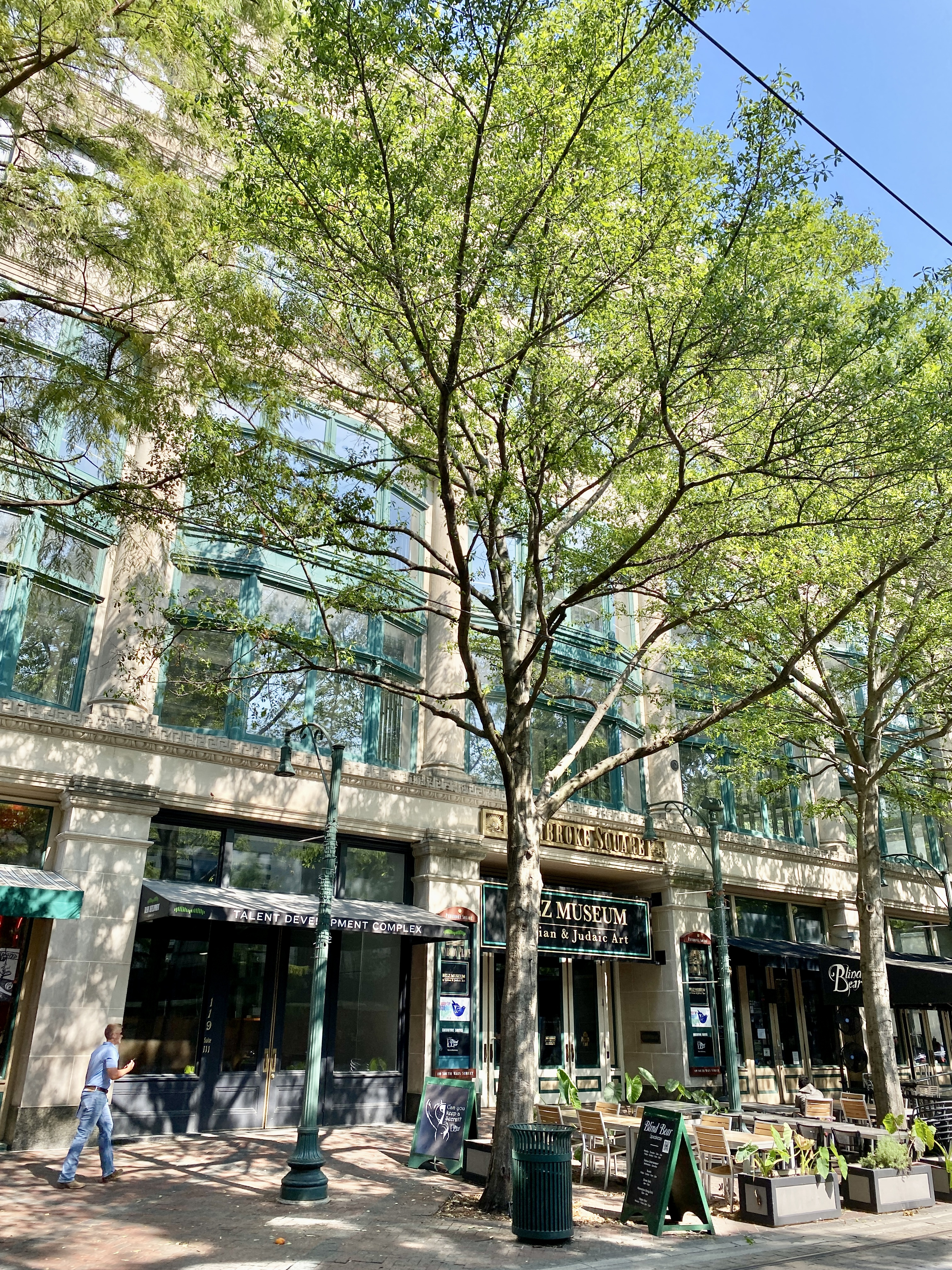
This Beaux Arts-style building at Main and Gayoso in downtown Memphis was constructed to house J. Goldsmith and Sons Department Store. The building was clad in a slipcover facade during the 1962 renovation, which has since been removed.

In 1870, with a $500 (~$12,730 in 2025) investment, the Goldsmith brothers opened a dry goods store at 163 Beale Street. The store relocated in 1895 to a larger facility at 125 Main, which it occupied through most of the 20th century. In 1952 Goldsmith's renovated its downtown location, expanding into the adjoining former Gayoso Hotel and adding a new facade. The downtown store was closed in 1993.

The department store began to build suburban locations in the 1960s, beginning with its 3-story Oak Court store at Poplar and Perkins which opened in 1961. This location was expanded in the early 1970s, when a 3-story addition was constructed immediately to the west of the existing store. The upper two levels of this structure served as parking, while the bottom level was connected to the first floor of the existing store and served as additional retail space. In the late 1970s, Goldsmith's once again expanded with an addition of the original building to the north. This addition contained 2 floors of above ground retail space. The Oak Court Mall opened in 1988 and was connected to the freestanding Goldsmith's. At the same time, another 2 story retail addition was constructed to the north of the original building which eventually became the Goldsmith's furniture gallery. This brought the store to nearly 400,000 sq ft (37,000 m^{2}) of retail space, now one of the largest Macy's locations in the country.

Goldsmith's continued to branch out with the construction of its 130,000 sq ft (12,000 m^{2}) Southland Mall location, which opened on August 23, 1966. August 1971 saw the opening of the fourth Goldsmith's store, located at the new Raleigh Springs Mall in north Memphis. By 1978, Goldsmiths occupied 800,000 sq ft (74,000 m^{2}) of retail space and 200,000 sq ft (19,000 m^{2}) of warehouse space in the city.

In 1981, Goldsmith's opened its fifth store at the new Hickory Ridge Mall in southeast Memphis.

The first Goldsmith's store built outside of the city of Memphis was at the Old Hickory Mall in Jackson, Tennessee, about 85 miles away from Memphis.

The last Goldsmith's store to be built was at Wolfchase Galleria, which opened in 1997.

Goldsmith's was acquired by Federated Department Stores in 1959, and added in 1988 to an Atlanta, Georgia-headquartered division led by that city's Rich's chain. The division expanded to include Cincinnati, Ohio-based Lazarus in 1995, with all of the division co-branded with Macy's in 2003. At the time of the name change to Macy's, five Goldsmith's stores remained in existence. Macy's current employee volunteer program, Partners in Time, was founded in 1989 at Goldsmith's (and Rich's) as a way to give back to the community.

Among the popular slogans of the store, one was "Memphis' Greatest Store," words seen prior to the name change on the outside of the store at the Oak Court Mall. Other widely used slogans were "All about the South", "A Mid-South tradition since 1870", and most recently, "Time After Time".

1995 Goldsmith's alternate logo

== Logo ==
Classic logo

The famous cursive-script logo was designed by Margaret Grace, a Goldsmith's advertising employee, in October 1946. An updated logo was released in the mid-90s, featuring sans-serif text and a new slogan, "Time After Time". The old logo was never replaced on any existing stores, but the new logo was installed when the new Wolfchase store was constructed. After public outcry of the lack of the classic logo at the new location, the sans-serif logo was removed after a few weeks and replaced with the classic cursive logo, which remained on all stores until the Macy's name change. While not used on the store buildings themselves, the sans-serif logo was prominently displayed on TV and radio advertisements. For a short time in 2005, advertisements showed a merged "Goldsmith's-Macy's" logo.

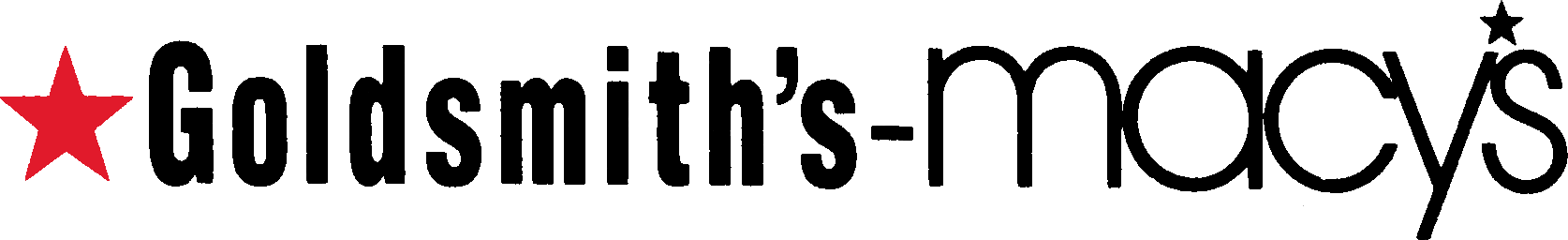
Goldsmith's-Macy's transition logo

== Current state of Goldsmith's stores ==
Two Goldsmith's locations, Downtown and Raleigh Springs, were closed prior to being rebranded by Macy's. The Downtown location is now home to the Belz Museum of Asian and Judaic Art and the Center for Southern Folklore. The Raleigh Springs location was closed in 2003 and has since been torn down with the rest of the mall. Of the remaining 5 stores, Hickory Ridge and Southland were closed after the name change to Macy's.

The Hickory Ridge location was effectively closed on February 5, 2008, after a tornado directly struck the mall during the Super Tuesday tornado outbreak. Macy's elected not to make the necessary repairs and instead permanently close the store. The building briefly became an Incredible Pizza Cafe before also closing in 2012. As of August 2016, the building remains vacant.

The Southland Mall Macy's location was closed in 2015, citing a restructuring of various Macy's locations.

The Jackson, TN store was closed in 2021.

As of 2021, the remaining stores are Oak Court and Wolfchase Galleria that still continue to operate as Macy's.

As of January 9, 2025 it was announced that Macy's Oak Court Mall at Poplar Ave and Perkins will be closing within the first quarter of 2025, leaving the Wolf Chase Galleria location as the only Macy's in the city of Memphis.

== See also ==
- List of department stores converted to Macy's
- List of defunct department stores of the United States
