= WRBH =

Radio station in New Orleans

Coordinates: 29.950°N 89.958°W

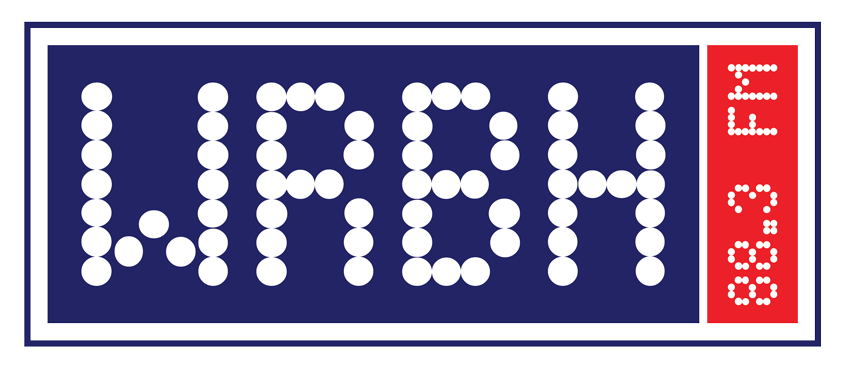

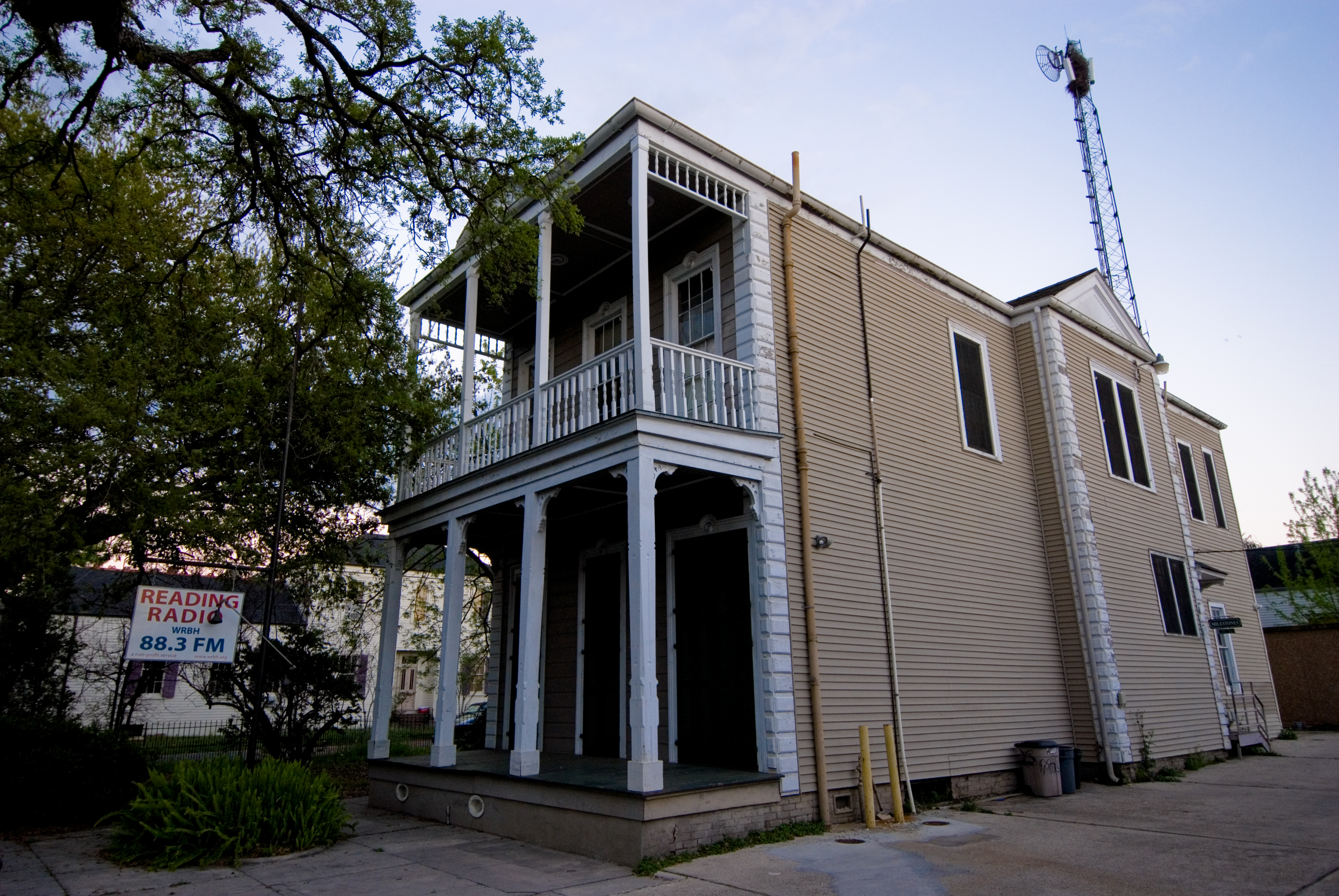
- WRBH studios on Magazine Street, Uptown New Orleans
- New Orleans, Louisiana; United States
- Broadcast area: New Orleans metropolitan area
- Frequency: 88.3 (MHz)

Programming
- Format: Radio reading service

Ownership
- Owner: Radio For The Blind & Print Handicapped, Inc.

History
- First air date: 1982
- Call sign meaning: Radio for the Blind & Handicapped

Technical information
- Facility ID: 54575
- Class: C1
- ERP: 51,000 watts
- HAAT: 190 meters (623 ft)

Links
- Webcast: MP3 stream; Web player
- Website: www.WRBH.org

WRBH (88.3 MHz) is a non-commercial FM radio station in New Orleans, Louisiana. It primarily provides a radio reading service for the blind and print-handicapped, without the usual use of a private subcarrier decoder. It is one of three such stations in the United States. Services include readings of books, original programming, and readings of periodicals, including The Wall Street Journal and The Times-Picayune/The New Orleans Advocate. WYPL in Memphis, Tennessee, provides similar services. The station also carries Tulane Green Wave sports, including Tulane's women's basketball and baseball.

The station's licensee is Radio For The Blind & Print Handicapped. The station has an effective radiated power (ERP) of 51,000 watts. The transmitter is located on Tournefort Street in Chalmette, Louisiana.

== Founding ==
WRBH was founded by a local mathematician, Dr. Robert McClean, who was blind. He envisioned an FM reading radio station, with programming content for the blind and visually impaired. In 1975, McClean began leasing airtime from WWNO and renting studio space from New Orleans’ Lighthouse for the Blind. By 1982, his efforts expanded after purchasing the 88.3 FM wavelength, making WRBH the United States’ first 24-hour FM reading radio station for the blind.

In 1994, WRBH purchased a 4,000-square-foot, 19th-century Victorian building on New Orleans’ Magazine Street. This location serves as WRBH's recording studio and administrative space. In 2000, WRBH added its programming to the internet via live audio streaming and podcasts.

In 2014, WRBH partnered with a New Orleans–based marketing and public relations firm to redesign its logo and website while also making the site fully compatible with screen reading software. The station is used by visually impaired persons in the New Orleans region and others worldwide through its online streaming capabilities.

== Background ==
Most information in print and on the internet is not easily accessible to those who cannot read. For the blind and print handicapped community, this lack of access to information can increase their sense of isolation, lower their standard of living, and become a serious obstacle in everyday life. WRBH seeks to keep everyone equally informed by providing access to news and information, promoting cultural enrichment, and encouraging mental and emotional independence for those who cannot read.

WRBH offers a wide variety of programming including local and national news, best-selling fiction and non-fiction books, magazine articles, children's books, event calendars, interview segments, health programs, cooking shows, and grocery store ads, as well as shows geared toward Spanish, Haitian, and Vietnamese communities. This programming is available 24 hours a day, 365 days a year because of the work of over 150 volunteers who donate nearly 5,000 hours of their time annually.

WRBH produces several in-house shows including Charlie's Music Show where host Charles Smith interviews musicians of all genres, Writers Forum, which provides an opportunity for local authors to discuss their work, and New Orleans by Mouth, moderated by Amy Sins.

== Audience ==
WRBH's target audience is those with difficulty reading. It also uses real human voices.

== Reach ==
WRBH's terrestrial broadcasting power is 25,000 watts, and the station’s range is 90-mile radius stretching over Hancock County, Mississippi, and the following Louisiana parishes: Orleans, Jefferson, St. Tammany, St. Charles, St. John, Terrebonne, St. Bernard, and Plaquemines.

== Awards ==
WRBH has garnered several accolades over the years, such as the City of New Orleans' Proclamation of Recognition for 30 Years of Service in 2012, the Governor's Media Award in 1999, the Mayor's Medal of Honor in 1998, and the designation as the 257th Point of Light by President George Bush, Sr. in 1990.

== Collaborations ==
- Lighthouse for the Blind
- Blinded Veterans Association
- New Orleans Filipino-American Lions Club
- Entergy
- Ben Franklin High School
- Young Leadership Council
- The Big Read
