= Lois M. DeBerry Special Needs Facility =

Maximum-security prison in Nashville, Tennessee

- Interactive map of Lois M. DeBerry Special Needs Facility
- Location: Nashville, Tennessee; 36.1919222°N 86.9054013°W
- Status: Operational
- Security class: Maximum
- Capacity: 854
- Opened: 1992
- Managed by: Tennessee Department of Correction
- Warden: James M. Holloway
- Website: Official website

The Lois M. DeBerry Special Needs Facility is a maximum-security prison in Nashville, Tennessee, operated by the Tennessee Department of Correction.

Opened in 1992, the facility houses prisoners with multiple and complex medical problems. The facility has a 250 bed-per-month turnover.

The Cumberland River flows along the facility's west boundary; Riverbend Maximum Security Institution is located immediately south of the facility.

== Services ==
The Lois M. DeBerry Special Needs Facility is equipped with three nursing units, and a secure community hospital that provides inpatient and outpatient care. Inmates include those requiring mental health intervention, those recovering from serious illness or surgery, inmates with long-term medical needs, and inmates whose treatment regimen is not manageable at other Tennessee Department of Corrections facilities.

== Visitation ==
The Reconciliation Guest House provides overnight lodging and kitchen facilities to families and friends who travel to Nashville to visit inmates at the Lois M. DeBerry Special Needs Facility.

== Notable inmates ==
- James Antonio Barnes, serial killer
- James Earl Ray, assassin who spent the last years of life at this hospital, and died in 1998
