= Crime in Memphis, Tennessee =

In 2014, the city of Memphis ranked eleventh in violent crimes for major cities around the U.S. In 2006, Memphis led the nation in number of violent crimes. In 2001, 2005, and 2007, Memphis ranked second most dangerous in the nation among cities with a population over 500,000. It also ranked as most dangerous in 2002. There are approximately 182 gangs in Memphis, Tennessee with 8,400 gang members in the county. On September 9, 2025, it was revealed that crime in Memphis had in fact dropped to a 25-year low across major categories.

== Murders ==
Murders by year
Year	Murders
2025	184
2024	250
2023	351
2022	253
2021	307
2020	293
2019	196
2018	188
2017	186
2016	200
2015	138
2014	144
2013	129
2012	141
2011	119
2010	93
2009	135

== Violent Crime Rates in Memphis, TN ==
Memphis (area)	Violent Crimes per capita*
Memphis, all	2,501
Downtown	3,086
Parkway Village - Oakhaven	2,773
Shelby Forest - Frayser	2,447
Berclair Highland Heights	2,422
Midtown	2,409
White Haven - Coro Lake	4,105
Raleigh	1,658
East Memphis, Colonial, Yorkshire	1,611
Hickory Ridge, South Riverdale	1,465
River Oaks, Kirby, Balmoral	774
Cordova, Appling	525
Eads, Fisherville	241
Windyke, Southwind	223

*per 100,000 people

== Crime dynamics ==
In 2004 violent crime in Memphis reached a record low for over a decade, that trend subsequently reversed. In 2005, Memphis was ranked the 4th most dangerous city with a population of 500,000 or higher in the U.S. By 2006, Memphis held the top position of number of violent crimes in America. Recent statistics show a downward trend in crime in Memphis. Between 2006 and 2008, the crime rate fell by 16%. The first half of 2009 saw a reduction in serious crime of over 10% from the previous year.

=== Increase ===
Crime in Memphis increased in 2005, and saw a dramatic rise in the first half of 2006. Nationally, cities follow similar trends, and crime numbers tend to be cyclical. Local experts and criminologists cite gang recruitment as one possible cause of the rise in crime in Memphis, and a reduction of 66% of federal funding to the Memphis Police Department. Between 2004 and 2008, the number of full-time officers in the Memphis Police Department fell by 23.2%.

In the first half of 2006, robbery of businesses increased 52.5%, robbery of individuals increased 28.5%, and homicide increased 18% over the same period of 2005. The Memphis Police Department has responded with the initiation of Operation Blue C.R.U.S.H. (Crime Reduction Using Statistical History), which targets crime hotspots and repeat offenders.

Memphis ended 2005 with 154 murders (431 in whole TN), and 2006 ended with 160. 2007 saw 164 murders (397 in whole TN).

In 2023, Memphis had the highest homicides in its history, 351 intentional homicides were recorded.

=== Decrease ===
Violent crimes dropped from 12,939 in 2008 to 12,047 the next year. Robbery dropped from 4,788 in 2008 to 4,137 in 2009. Aggravated assault dropped 53,870 in 2008 to 47,158 in 2009 (FBI's UCR).

The Memphis Police Department's use of the FBI National Incident-Based Reporting System, which is a more detailed method of reporting crimes than what is used in many other major cities, has been cited as a reason for Memphis's frequent appearance on lists of most dangerous U.S. cities.

According to the Tennessee Bureau of Investigations, violent crime in Memphis decreased by 6.4% in 2014. Non-violent crimes decreased by 16.3%. Both of these were a much greater decrease than Tennessee's statewide averages of 2.4% and 2.5%, respectively.

== Policing ==
In 2019, the Memphis Police Department had 2,635 full-time sworn personnel (defined as those with general arrest powers) and 2,058 total officers. In 2013, after several gang related robberies at Tom Lee Park, the Memphis Police Department said that "they often feel powerless to control these out-of-control teens."

== See also ==
- Crime in Tennessee
- Gangs in Memphis, Tennessee
- Demographic Data
