= LEAD Public Schools =

American education non-profit organization

- Founded: 2007
- Founder: Jeremy Kane
- Type: Nonprofit organization
- Location: Nashville, Tennessee
- Website: https://leadpublicschools.org

LEAD Public Schools is an American non-profit organization based in Nashville, US running a network of charter schools. LEAD was founded in 2007 by Jeremy Kane as the first charter management organization in the state of Tennessee. Since its establishment, LEAD has grown to serve 1,250 students across Nashville. As part of a statewide initiative to improve under-performing schools, LEAD received millions of dollars to expand its reach in the local area. Its growth has been augmented by a partnership with Metro Nashville Public Schools and the Achievement School District, which selected LEAD as the charter operator for turnaround schools in these districts. Chris Barbic, the founder of Yes Prep and the superintendent of the Achievement School District, expressed his thoughts regarding LEAD's results in a public press release.

== LEAD schools ==
- LEAD Academy high school
- Cameron College Prep currently serves grades 5-8. This is LEAD's, and Tennessee's, first conversion school. LEAD took over Cameron Middle School, one of the low-performing schools in the Metro Nashville district, to create Cameron College Prep.
- LEAD Academy High School serves grades 9-12. LEAD's first graduating class will graduate in May 2014.
- Brick Church College Prep serves grades 5-8. This school is a partnership between LEAD Public Schools, Metro Nashville Public Schools, and the Achievement School District.
- LEAD Prep Southeast serves grades 5-8. This is LEAD Public Schools' newest charter school.
- LEAD Neely’s Bend serves grades 5-8 as a zoned charter school in partnership with the Achievement School District.
