= Hickory Ridge Mall =

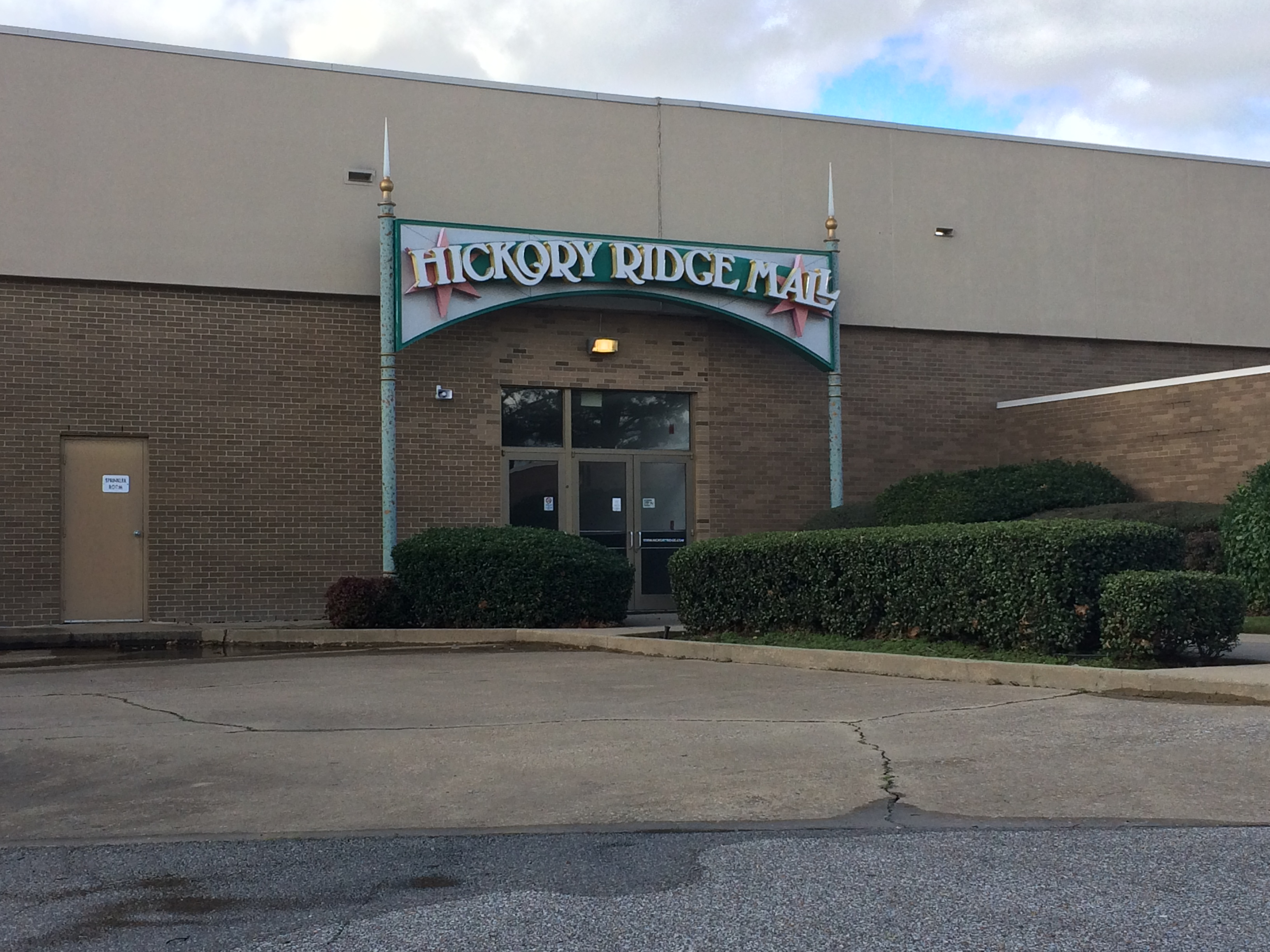
- Entrance to Hickory Ridge Mall, December 2015
- Location: Memphis, Tennessee, United States
- Coordinates: 35.0474°N 89.8612°W
- Address: Winchester Road near Ridgeway Road
- Opened: 1981 (expanded in 1986 & 1997), Reopened April 2010
- Manager: World Overcomers Ministries, Inc.
- Owner: Hickory Ridge Corp
- Num. of stores: 43 stores
- Num. of anchor tenants: 1
- Floor area: 787,000 square feet (73,100 m^{2}) (GLA)
- Floors: 1 (2 in former Dillard's and former Macy's)
- Public transit: MATA
- Website: www.hickoryridge.com (2019 archive)

Hickory Ridge Mall is a community shopping mall located in Memphis, Tennessee. It was severely damaged by a tornado on February 5, 2008. The mall was renovated and reopened in 2010.

== Key features ==
The mall featured more than 100 stores at its peak.

With 855,000 square feet (79,400 m^{2}) of gross leasable area it is considered a community "Towne Center" mall.

== Anchors ==
Sears: Opened in 1981, Closed in late 2013- early 2014

Goldsmiths: Opened in 1981, reopened as Macy's in 2006, Closed in 2008 due to Macy's choosing not to fix the damage left behind by the tornado.

Dillards: Opened in 1986, closed in 2006.

CubeSmart: Opened in 2021 in the former Sears space, closed in mid to late 2022.

Extra Space Storage: Opened in mid to late 2022, replaced CubeSmart and is still open as of November 2024.

== History ==
It was opened in 1981 with Goldsmith's (later Macy's) and Sears as the anchor stores. In 1986 it was expanded with Dillard's. MM Cohn and Dawahares also operated as junior anchors. In 1997 the mall was renovated to help the mall compete with the Wolfchase Galleria mall opening that year. By the early 2000s, the mall had begun to lose tenants due to shifting demographics and a number of vacant big-box stores in the area. The Dillard's store closed in early 2006. In 2021, CubeSmart replaced the former Sears space. CubeSmart closed in mid to late 2022 and was replaced by Extra Space Storage which is still open as of November 2024.

== Tornado ==
On February 5, 2008, the Hickory Ridge Mall was hit by a tornado. The Sears store, the Macy's store, and the mall's main entrance were heavily damaged, but despite an initial statement from management that the mall would remain closed "indefinitely" for cleanup, temporary repairs made at record speed allowed Sears to reopen on Sunday, February 10, 2008. Significant repairs and restorations will still be required, however. Several people were injured. A spokesperson for the state's Emergency Management Agency said that one person was killed; however, it was never confirmed, although three people were killed at a warehouse near the mall. Debris from the mall, in the form of insulating foam, was scattered all over the Memphis area, following the storm path northeastward at least 15 miles (24 km) to the Wolfchase area.

World Overcomers Ministries eventually purchased the mall from its former owners, signaling their intent to reopen Hickory Ridge. Renovation on the mall began in 2008, and the mall reopened on April 3, 2010, with a community celebration. Under the new ownership, the former Macy's was replaced with an America's Incredible Pizza Company, which closed in 2012.

The closure of Sears, the last remaining anchor store, was announced in September 2013.
