= Memphis Public Libraries =

Municipal library system in Tennessee, USA

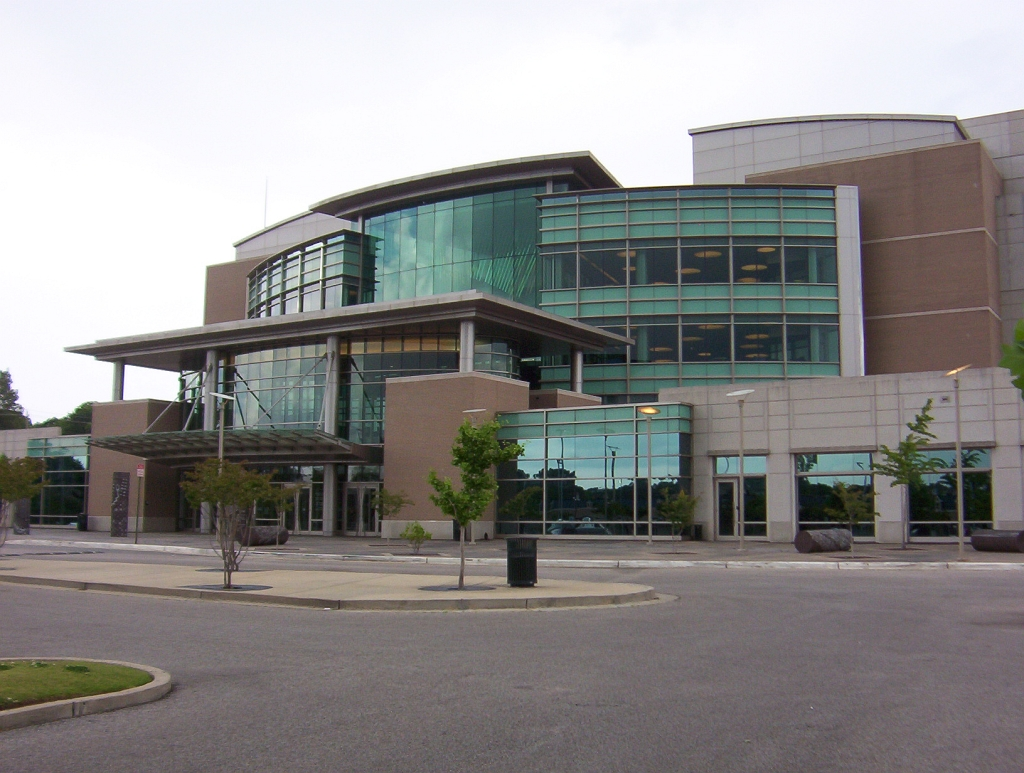
- Benjamin L. Hooks Central Library (2009)
- 35°08′00″N 89°57′39″W
- Location: Memphis, Tennessee
- Type: Public library
- Established: April 12, 1893 (133 years ago)
- Branches: 18

Access and use
- Population served: 938,000 (Shelby County)

Other information
- Website: memphislibrary.org

Memphis Public Libraries (MPL) is a public library system serving Shelby County, Tennessee. It has 18 branches located throughout the city of Memphis and surrounding areas, offering up to 3,400 programs to the public each year. In 2023, the library had an overall circulation of 1,148,494 items.

== History ==
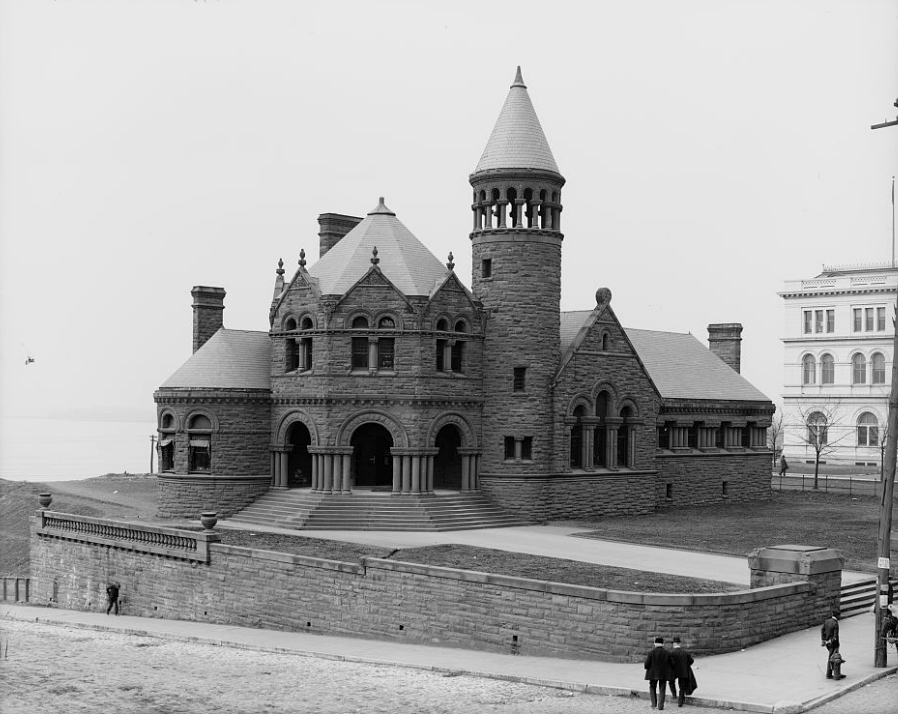
Cossitt Library (1906)

=== 1880s: Founding ===
The history of Memphis Public Libraries began in the 1880s, when the city received $75,000 from Frederick Cossitt to build a public library on a plot of land near the Mississippi River.

However, when the library opened on April 12, 1893, it was soon made clear that the city government lacked funds for books; upon its grand opening, the library's shelves were empty. Memphians acted quickly, holding fundraisers and events that would eventually fill the Cossitt Library with books and research materials.

=== 1900s to 1990s: Growth and change ===
In March 1925, Jesse Cunningham was hired to serve as former library director Charles Dutton Johnston's successor. A graduate from the New York State Library School, Cunningham introduced a number of new standards to Memphis. In 1931 Cunningham established libraries were established in Shelby County schools, and a bookmobile began to service up to fifteen rural communities. By 1939 a library branch for African Americans was built on Vance Avenue, which has since been named for longtime Vance resident and civil rights activist, Cornelia Crenshaw.

==== Desegregation ====
Not long after the construction of the Highland branch and main library in 1951 and 1955, respectively, C. Lamar Wallis was brought on after Cunningham's retirement in 1958. Under Wallis's leadership a branch was built in nearly every section of the county. In 1973, it was decided that city and county governments would jointly fund local libraries, marking the creation of the Memphis/Shelby County Public Library system.

Sit-in demonstrations were also held by black college students. On March 20, 1960, students sat in at the Central Library and the Cossitt Reference Library. They were arrested and jailed. This event, combined with Jesse Turner's lawsuit, led to the desegregation of all public libraries in October 1960.

Controversy during Wallis's tenure continued; in 1969 he gained national attention for refusing to remove Phillip Roth's novel Portnoy's Complaint against the mayor's objections. This along with his call to desegregate Memphis's public libraries led Wallis to receive the Tennessee Library Association's Freedom of Information Award in 1998.

==== Judith A. Drescher: First female director ====
Judith A. Drescher was brought on in 1985 as the sixth library director, and the first female library director in Memphis. She exercised the system's belief that libraries are a core information source for the community by bringing underserved areas library services via mobile units. Additionally, she oversaw the construction of the Cordova and East Shelby branches.

=== 2000s to present ===
In 2001, the Benjamin L. Hooks Central Library opened to the public. It featured a multi-story hub comprising a large children's section, space for communal gatherings, reading rooms, computer training labs, and more.

On January 9, 2024, the Bartlett Board of Mayor and Aldermen voted to leave the MPL system, being the last of the eight suburbs in Shelby County to do so.

== Branches ==
As of July 2017, Memphis Public Libraries operated 18 branches throughout Shelby County, including the main Benjamin L. Hooks Central Library branch located in East Memphis.

| Library | Picture | Address | Historical Note |
|---|---|---|---|
| Benjamin L. Hooks Central Library | | 3030 Poplar Ave. | The Central Library opened in November 2001. |
| Cherokee Library | | 3300 Sharpe Ave. | |
| Cordova Library | | 8457 Trinity Rd. | |
| Cornelia Crenshaw Memorial Library | | 531 Vance Ave. | |
| Cossitt Library | | 33 South Front St. | The Cossitt branch opened in 1893 as Memphis' first public library. The original building was demolished in 1959 and replaced with a more modern building. |
| East Shelby Library | | 7200 East Shelby Dr. | |
| Frayser Library | | 2220 James Rd. | The Frayser branch opened in May 2025, replacing the previous location at 3712 Argonne St, which opened in 1961. |
| Gaston Park Library | | 1040 S. Third St. | |
| Hollywood Library | | 1530 N. Hollywood St. | |
| Levi Library | | 3676 Hwy 61 South | |
| North Library | | 1192 Vollintine Ave. | |
| Parkway Village Library | | 4655 Knight Arnold Rd. | |
| Officer Geoffrey Redd Library | | 5094 Poplar Ave. | The branch was formerly known as the Poplar-White Station Library. |
| Orange Mound Library | | 843 Dallas St. | The Orange Mound branch opened in April 2024. |
| Raleigh Library | | 3452 Austin Peay Hwy. | The Raleigh branch was previously located at 3157 Powers Rd, with the current location at the Raleigh Springs Civic Center opening in December 2020. |
| Randolph Library | | 3752 Given Ave. | |
| South Library | | 1929 South Third St. | |
| Whitehaven Library | | 4120 Mill Branch Rd. | |

== WYPL ==
WYPL (89.3 FM) is a non-commercial radio station that provides an open radio reading service to patrons. Book readings, author interviews, and both local and international news programming are among the station's offerings. The wide array of broadcasts spans from Eye On Vision, a program featuring doctors' input on the latest research in the field of vision and eye care, to AfricaLink, which provides insight into the latest developments in African news. The station's diverse and quality content has led it to be selected as the Model Radio Reading Service by the American Foundation for the Blind.
