= Raleigh Springs Civic Center =

Civil center in Memphis, Tennessee, US

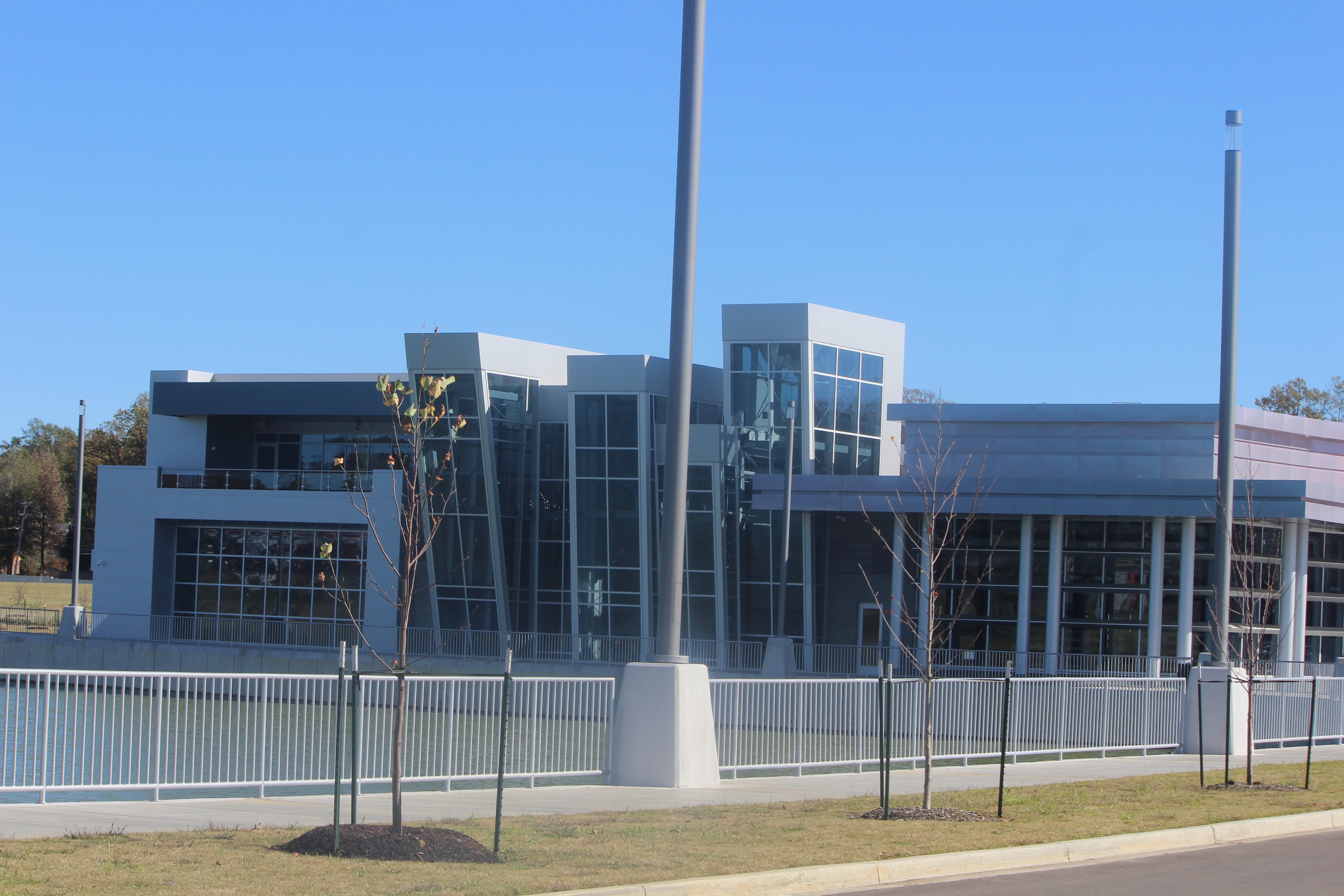
- Library at Raleigh Springs Civic Center
- Interactive map of the Raleigh Springs Civic Center area

General information
- Location: 3384 Austin Peay Hwy, Memphis, Tennessee 38128, United States
- Coordinates: 35.21748732909717°N 89.90908810234177°W
- Current tenants: Memphis Public Libraries; Memphis Police Department
- Construction started: March 1, 2018
- Completed: 2020
- Inaugurated: November 19, 2020
- Cost: $45 million
- Owner: Memphis City Council

Design and construction
- Architecture firm: OT Marshall Architects
- Main contractor: Zellner Construction Services LLC

Other information
- Public transit: MATA

Raleigh Springs Civic Center is a 65-acre civic center located in Memphis, Tennessee, United States. The property is owned by the Memphis City Council and was constructed on the site of the former Raleigh Springs Mall. The site features a pond with a scenic walking trail and skatepark that is open to the public. The Raleigh Springs Civic Center houses the Memphis Police Department Old Allen Precinct, Union Avenue Traffic Division, and the Raleigh Library.

The library features an observation deck overlooking the 11-acre pond and was designed by O.T. Marshall Architects. The road "Morrison Drive" leading into the civic center is named for Bill Morrison, a member of the Memphis City Council from 2008 to 2018, who championed the project.

== History ==
Raleigh Springs Civic Center is located on the site of the Raleigh Springs Mall, which was demolished in 2016. The groundbreaking for the civic center took place in December 2017, with construction beginning the following year.

The walking trail, skatepark, and police station civic center opened in the spring of 2020. Construction of the new Raleigh Library was delated due to the COVID-19 pandemic, with the official ribbon cutting occurring on November 19, 2020. The virtual "ribbon cutting" ceremony was live streamed for the community by The City of Memphis, with limited number of invitees due to the ongoing COVID-19 pandemic in Tennessee.

=== Artwork ===
The Great Wall of Raleigh mural is still under creation, featuring mural art from local artists. The Great Wall of Raleigh runs behind the Raleigh Springs Civic Center. Works by local artists are also placed along the walking trail that borders the retention pond, inside the library and the police precinct.

== Gallery ==
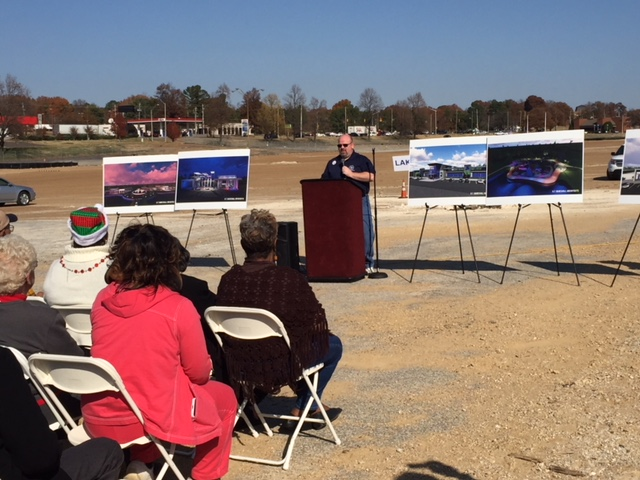
Councilman Morrison speaks at the groundbreaking ceremony on December 2, 2017

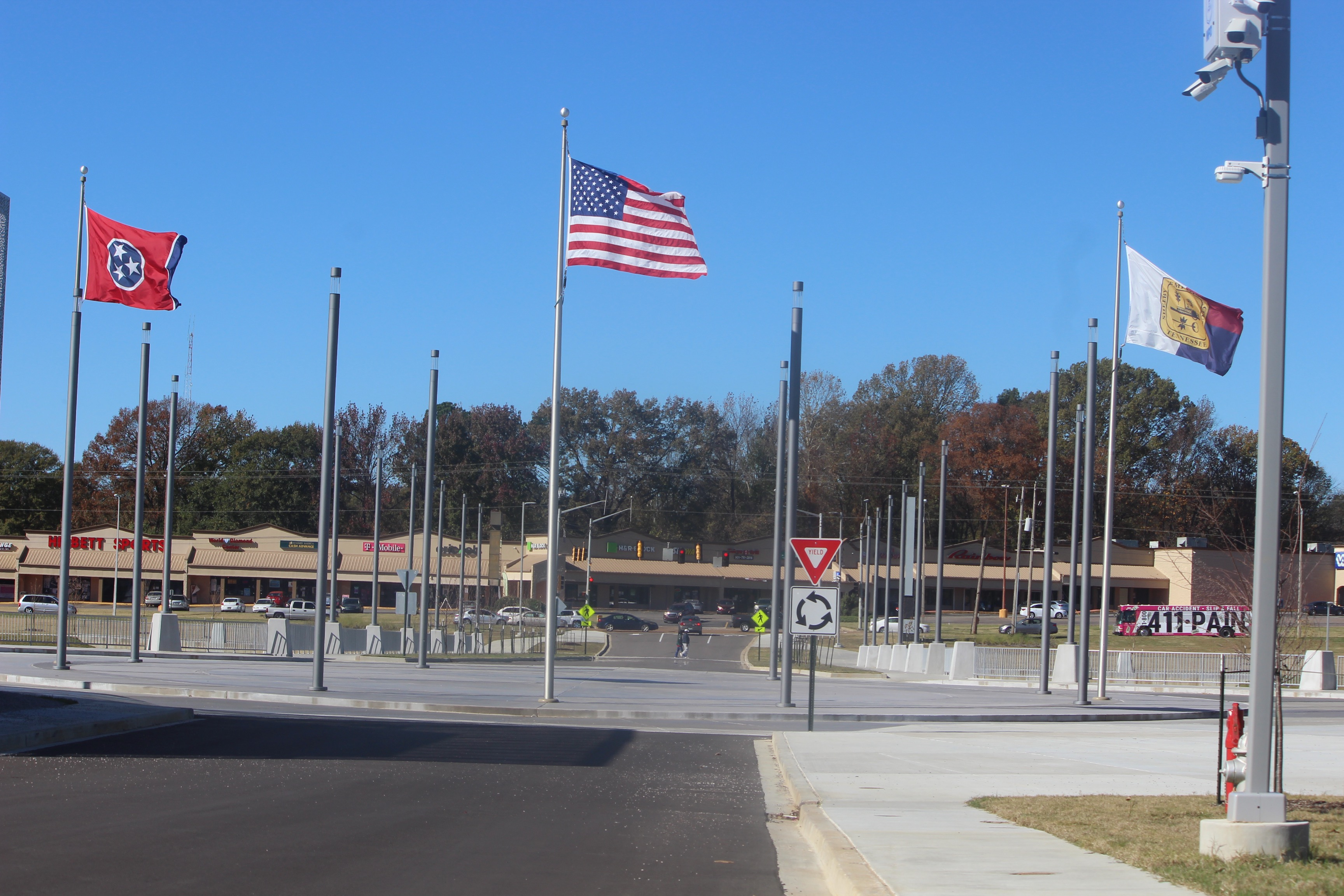
Flags at the Morrison Drive roundabout

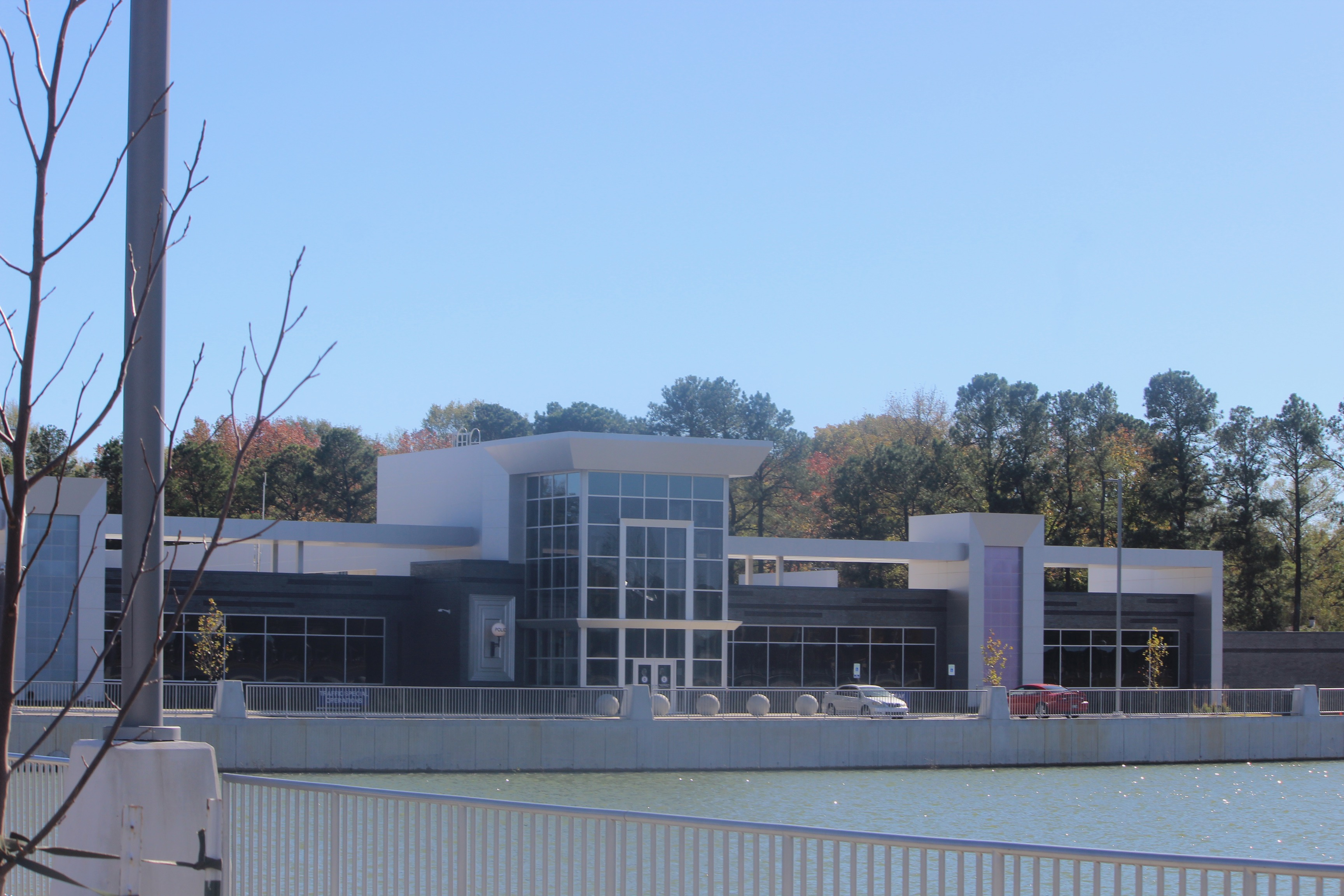
Memphis Police Department Austin Peay Station
