= WYPL =

Memphis, Tennessee; United States
- Broadcast area: Memphis
- Frequency: 89.3 MHz
- Branding: Memphis Public Library Reading Radio

Programming
- Format: radio reading service
- Affiliations: BBC News; WMC-TV audio simulcast of NBC Nightly News

Ownership
- Owner: Memphis Public Library & Information Center

History
- First air date: 1991
- Former call signs: WLYX; WTTL (West Tennessee Talking Library)
- Call sign meaning: We're Your Public Library

Technical information
- Licensing authority: FCC
- Facility ID: 13996
- Class: C0
- ERP: 100,000 watts
- HAAT: 382.0 meters
- Transmitter coordinates: 35°28′3.00″N 90°11′27.00″W

Links
- Public license information: Public file; LMS
- Webcast: http://radio.securenetsystems.net/v5/index.cfm?stationCallSign=WYPL&launchFrom=stick
- Website: Official website

WYPL (89.3 FM) is a non-commercial radio station that serves the area of Memphis, Tennessee, in the United States. The station is licensed to the Memphis Public Library & Information Center and provides an open radio reading service to patrons, a type of service usually available elsewhere in the United States only on special leased receivers. This station is only of two such open-air broadcasting operations in the United States; the other is located in New Orleans.

Volunteers present daily readings of The Commercial Appeal, USA Today, and other newspapers. The station also features book readings, author interviews, news programming provided by BBC News, and audio simulcasts of the midday newscasts of WMC-TV (Channel 5), along with the NBC Nightly News. The station has been selected by the American Foundation for the Blind as the Model Radio Reading Service.

Locally-produced programs include Book Talk, which features interviews with authors; Library News; Eye On Vision, which features interviews with doctors and also provides information on research and development in vision and eye care; and Night Owl, a story-reading program aimed at children aged six and under, co-ordinated to a probable bedtime.

WTTL was the first radio station established for the Memphis Shelby County Library System in 1980. It moved to the 89.3 frequency on April 17, 1991; that frequency first went on air as WLYX (whose date of first operations is also unclear), a station licensed to Southwestern at Memphis (now Rhodes College), and was branded as "The Alternative." The freeform college rock station was operated by a student and volunteer staff with broadly eclectic tastes, and was widely influential in bringing genres such as punk and new wave to the Memphis area in the early 1980s. The station was discontinued in 1989, when Rhodes president James Daughdrill, a strong social conservative, decided that WLYX was not in keeping with the college's core mission.

In perhaps something of a tribute to the old WLYX, though, WYPL added music programming in the evenings during the 2010s, mainly nostalgic material relating to Memphis' heyday from the 1950s to the 1970s as a recording center for rock, soul and blues music.

== See also ==
- Radio reading service
- WRBH, the only other open-air reading service in the U.S.
