= Martin Luther King Jr. College Preparatory High School =

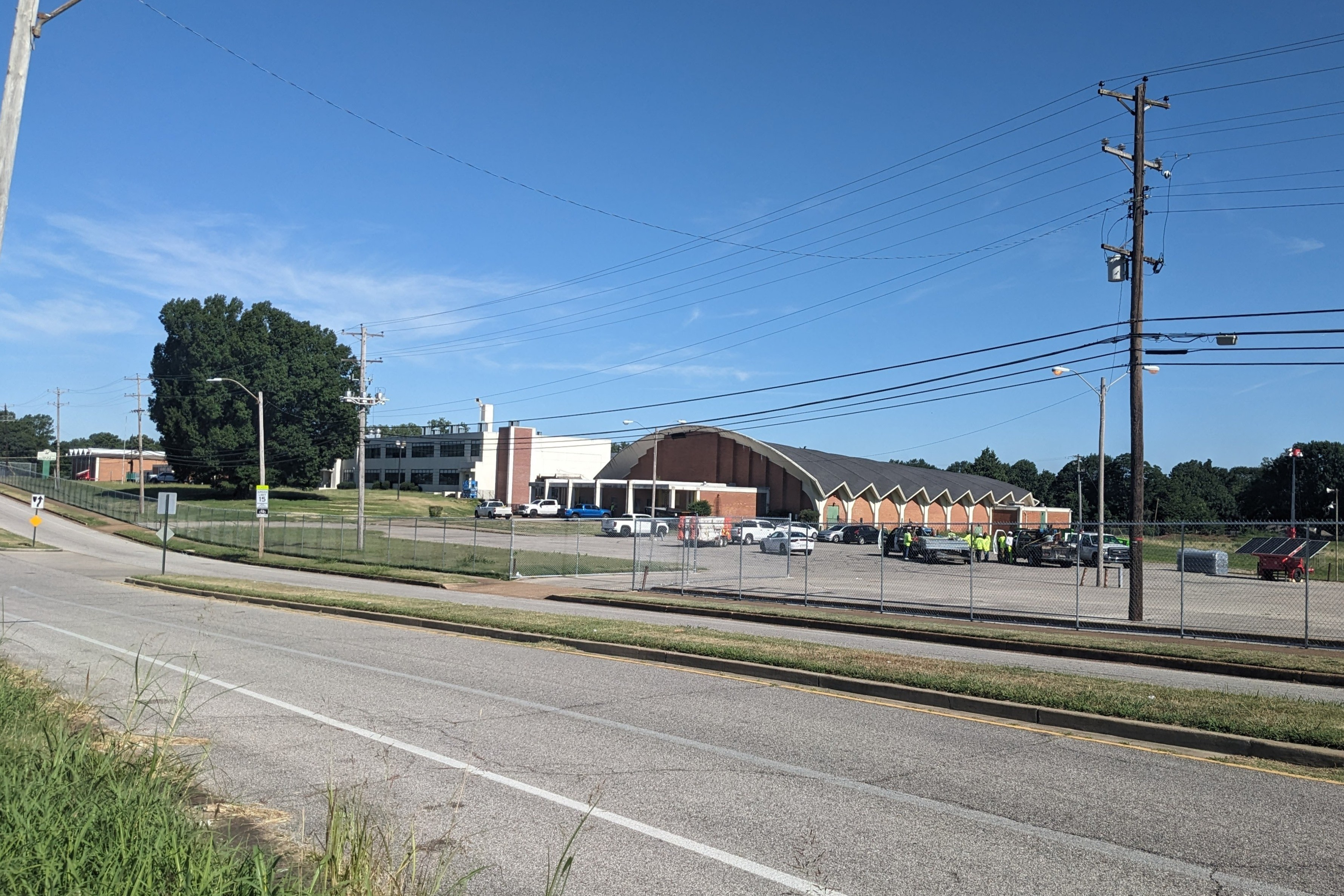
- MLK Jr. College Prep in 2024 prior to demolition

Location
- 1530 Dellwood Ave; Memphis, Tennessee 38127; United States; 35.213611°N 90.011667°W

Information
- Former name: Frayser High School
- Type: Charter School
- Closed: May 2024
- School district: Frayser Community Schools
- NCES District ID: 470014701064
- Principal: Chiquita Perry
- Teaching staff: 27.83 (FTE) (2023-2024)
- Grades: 9–12
- Gender: Coed
- Enrollment: 491 (2023-2024)
- Student to teacher ratio: 17.64 (2023-2024)
- Website: fraysercs.org/martin-luther-king-jr-college-preparatory-high-school/

Martin Luther King Jr. College Preparatory High School, previously known as Frayser High School, was a charter high school located in Memphis, Tennessee. It was demolished in fall of 2024. It operated as part of the Frayser Community Schools district between 2014-2024.

== History ==
A new auditorium and gymnasium were opened on November 14, 1951. The school was further expanded in 1959 with the addition of two portable classrooms.

On July 1, 2014, the newly formed Frayser Community Schools, a part of the Achievement School District, took over Frayser High School and renamed it MLK Jr. College Preparatory High.

In 2021, Shelby County Schools announced plans to replace MLK Prep High School and Trezevant High School with a new school. MLK Prep closed for demolition in May 2024. The Shelby County Board of Commissioners approved the final funds needed for the $112 million project on December 16, 2024 and construction broke ground on April 1, 2025.

== Notable alumni ==
- GloRilla, rapper
