= CubeSmart =

Real estate investment trust

- Formerly: U-Store-It Trust (2004–2011)
- Type: Public company
- Traded as: NYSE: CUBE; S&P 400 component
- Industry: Real estate investment trust
- Founded: July 2004; 22 years ago in Maryland, U.S.
- Headquarters: Malvern, Pennsylvania, U.S.
- Number of locations: 611 stores (December 2022)
- Key people: Christopher P. Marr (CEO); Timothy M. Martin (CFO); Joel Keaton (COO)
- Products: Self storage
- Revenue: ▲US$1.12 billion (2025)
- Net income: ▼US$331 million (2025)
- Total assets: ▲US$6.64 billion (2025)
- Total equity: ▼US$2.72 billion (2025)
- Number of employees: 2,804 (2022)
- Website: www.cubesmart.com

CubeSmart is a real estate investment trust that invests in self storage facilities in the United States. As of December 31, 2024, it owned 631 self storage properties in 25 states and the District of Columbia containing 45.8 million rentable square feet. It is the 3rd largest self storage company in the United States.

The company was known as U-Store-It Trust until 2011.

== History ==
The company was founded in July 2004 as U-Store-It Trust.

In October 2004, the company became a public company via an initial public offering.

In December 2008, the company transferred its headquarters to Malvern, Pennsylvania.

On September 14, 2011, the company changed its name to CubeSmart.

In December 2021, the company acquired Storage West for $1.7 billion.
