= Mall of Memphis =

- The Ice Chalet at the former Mall of Memphis
- Location: Memphis, Tennessee, United States
- Coordinates: 35.074613°N 89.914555°W
- Address: 4451 American Way
- Opened: October 7, 1981
- Closed: December 24, 2003
- Demolished: 2004
- Developer: TrizecHahn Corporation
- Num. of stores: 160
- Num. of anchor tenants: 3
- Floor area: 885,627 square feet (82,277.4 m^{2}) (GLA)
- Floors: 2
- Website: www.mallofmemphis.org

The Mall of Memphis was a shopping mall in Memphis, Tennessee, containing 885,627 sq ft (82,277.4 m^{2}) of retail space and 5,564 parking spaces. The mall opened October 7, 1981, closed on December 24, 2003, and was demolished in 2004. Among other things, the mall was home to the Ice Chalet, Memphis's only public ice rink.

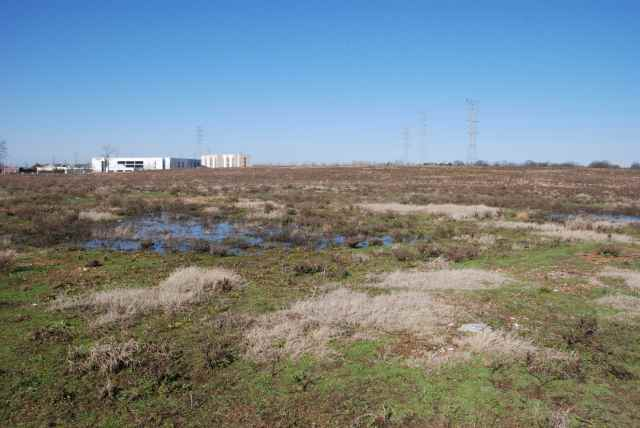
The Mall of Memphis site in 2008.

== History ==
The Mall of Memphis and the commercial area that developed around it prospered throughout the 1980s and into the 1990s. However, in the late 1980s and early 1990s, several deadly shootings and a rash of robberies occurred on or near the mall's parking lots. These events led to the Mall of Memphis developing a reputation for being unsafe and being nicknamed the "Mall of Murder". A study done by Rhodes College in 2006 shows the media's impact of giving the mall this reputation and also studying how the mall's nickname may have resulted in its death.

In the 1990s, in an effort to escape the growing crime in the area, many of the mall's clientele moved east to Germantown, Collierville, Bartlett and Cordova, making trips to and from the mall longer and less convenient. A new mall, the Wolfchase Galleria, opened in 1997 between Bartlett and Cordova. Other shopping centers and big box retailers opened near the new mall. This took away most of the business from the Mall of Memphis and the commercial area surrounding it. Later, the closure of anchor store Service Merchandise due to a corporate bankruptcy, and the 2001 closures of anchors JCPenney and Dillard's drove away most of the remaining clientele. Without anchor stores, the Mall of Memphis could not afford to remain in operation.

The mall underwent an extensive renovation shortly before it closed, in an unsuccessful attempt to attract new business. Although new tenants opened, the full renovation was never completed, which would have included a face lift and a name change to Memphis Park Galleria. This meant that when the mall was closed and demolished, many of its features, such as benches, railings, elevators and interior decor, were still in new condition, having seldom been used.

By April 2007, a newspaper report by The Commercial Appeal stated that Wal-Mart planned to build a 176,000 square-foot Supercenter location on a portion of the site. At the time, the retailer was under contract to purchase approximately 22 of the former mall site's 95 acres (380,000 m^{2}) for the project. However, due to corporate decisions about building too much too fast, Wal-Mart abandoned plans to build on the site.

The site of the Mall is now a TAG Truck Center by Lonestar Truck Group.

== See also ==
- Dead mall
