= Memphis Teacher Residency =

Teacher residency in Memphis, Tennessee

Memphis Teacher Residency Inc.
- Founded: December 2009
- Founder: David Montague
- Type: Teacher Preparation Program
- Location: Memphis, TN
- Coordinates: 35.133491°N 89.988145°W
- Website: memphistr.org

Memphis Teacher Residency (MTR) is a teacher residency located in Memphis, Tennessee, and is a member of the National Center for Teacher Residencies (NCTR) network. MTR is a faith-based, four-year teacher preparation program based on the residency model.

During the residency year, residents train with a mentor, receive coaching, and take coursework through Union University, earning a Master of Urban Education degree at the end of the residency year. After the first year, residents are placed in MTR partner schools in six partner under-resourced neighborhoods for a three-year teaching commitment. During these three years, residents teach in local schools while continuing to receive coaching, training, and support through MTR.

Memphis Teacher Residency believes that educational inequality is "one of the Greatest Social Justice and Civil Rights Issues in America Today". Working with a Christian worldview of why equal educational opportunity is important, MTR's mission in is:

"As a response to the gospel mandate to love our neighbors as ourselves, MTR will partner to provide students in Memphis neighborhoods with the same, or better, quality of education as is available to any student in Memphis by recruiting, training and supporting effective teachers within a Christian context.."

Since 2012, Memphis Teacher Residency has been highly rated in the Tennessee Teacher Preparation Report Card. MTR also operates MTR Camp, an academic enrichment camp with the goal of reducing the achievement gaps among disadvantaged students that often widen during summer months. MTR Camp also employs college interns interested in teaching after graduation in an effort to expose them to the educational inequality in Memphis and to the residency opportunity after college.
