= Jesse H Turner Park =

Park in Memphis, Tennessee, United States

Coordinates: 35.1103°N 90.0201°W

- Interactive map of Jesse H Turner Park
- Type: Public
- Location: Memphis, Tennessee, U.S.
- Public transit: MATA

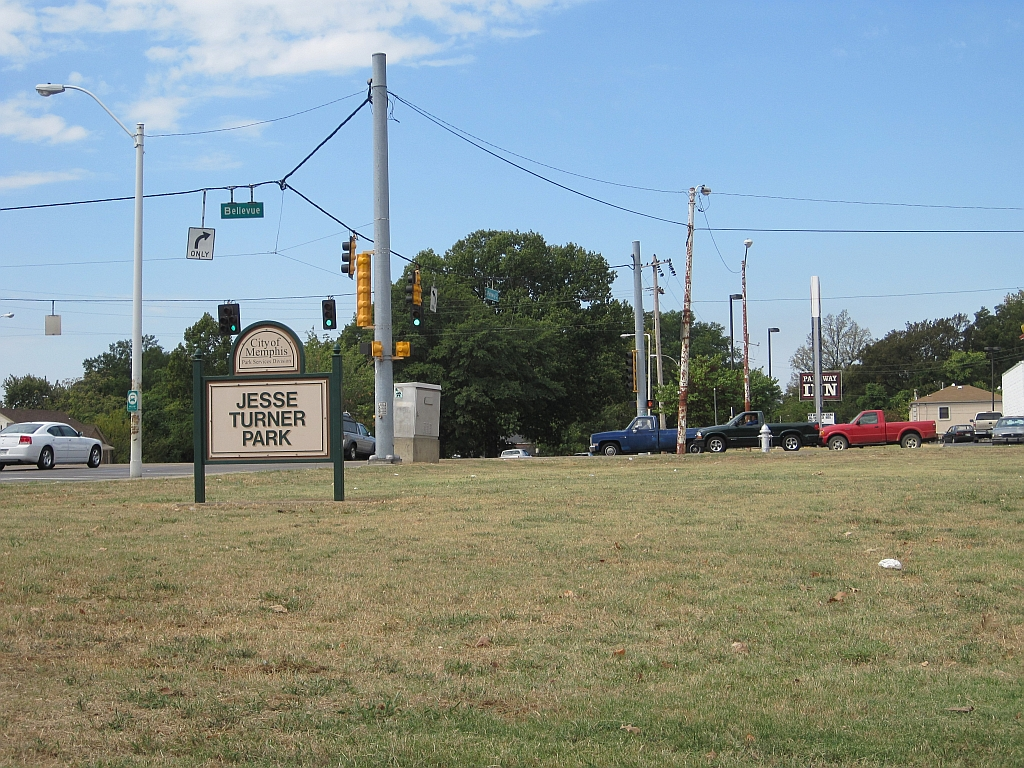

Jesse H Turner Park is a public park in Memphis, Tennessee at the corner of South Parkway and Bellevue in South Memphis. Jesse H. Turner Sr. was a major civil rights champion and former president of Tri-State Bank in Memphis, Tennessee. Jesse H. Turner, Sr. had a long and dedicated service to the NAACP, which began when he was a student at LeMoyne College. A lawsuit which Turner filed would also prove pivotal to the integration of Memphis Public Libraries in October 1960. He became a longtime treasurer of the national NAACP organization. He was also the first black CPA of Tennessee, and the first black chairman of the Shelby County Board of Commissioners.

His son, Jesse Turner Jr., was the first African-American to attend a white high school in the Memphis area, graduating co-salutatorian from Christian Brothers High School in 1967.
