= Achievement School District =

Education organization in Memphis, United States

Address
- 710 James Robertson Pkwy Nashville, Tennessee, 37243; United States

District information
- Grades: 6–12
- Schools: 3 (2024-25)
- NCES District ID: 4700147

Other information
- Website: www.tn.gov/achievementschooldistrict.html

The Achievement School District (ASD) is a specialized public school district in Tennessee providing academic intervention in the lowest performing schools in Tennessee, with the goal of increasing student achievement in those schools. The ASD's assigned task is to move the bottom 5% of schools in Tennessee to the top 25% of schools in the state. The Achievement School District was created to cause "school turnaround," a term meaning rapid results in poorer-performing schools. The Achievement School District is modeled after the Louisiana Recovery School District and takes elements from Michigan's state-run district for failing schools as well.

== History ==
Tennessee received funding from the federal government to create the Achievement School District when it won Race to the Top, a United States Department of Education contest created to spur innovation and reforms in state and local district K–12 education. The Achievement School District was created to improve student achievement in Tennessee's Priority Schools—those in the bottom 5% in the state—and in so doing, increasing students' career options and life outcomes. It is modeled from principles of President Bush's No Child Left Behind Act of 2001 and Obama's Race to the Top legislation. Various states submit their budget proposals in order to receive financial support. Schools in desperate need of change are labelled as priority schools. Those priority schools are added into this school district with the goal to be eventually released back into city and state school systems. They acquire staff from programs such as the Memphis Teacher Residency and Teach for America.

However, research published by Brown University in 2024 found that ASD did not significantly improve students' test scores nor high school graduation rates. In April 2025, the Tennessee House of Representatives passed legislature to replace ASD with a tiered intervention system starting in the 2026-27 school year. This decision was made to give local school districts more control over what intervention methods to utilize.

== Leadership ==
Malika Anderson was named the superintendent of the Achievement School District in November 2015 by the Tennessee Department of Education. She was preceded by Chris Barbic, who served in the role from 2011 to 2015. The district depends on charter management organizations (CMOs) in order to run and fund these charter schools. CMOs come from various sources such as the state, national organizations, and financial donors. The Achievement School District creates autonomy for these schools to launch the programs they need.

== Schools ==
The bottom 5% of Tennessee schools include 83 schools across Memphis, Jackson, Nashville, Knoxville and Chattanooga. As of May 2025, there are 3 schools in the ASD: Hillcrest High School, Kirby Middle School, and Wooddale Middle School. They are all located in Memphis and operated by IOTA Community Schools.

=== Former schools ===
Elementary school
School	Grades served	School operator	Location	Year opened
Aspire Coleman Elementary	PK–6	Aspire Public Schools	Memphis	2014
Aspire Hanley Elementary #1	K–7	Aspire Public Schools	Memphis	2013
Aspire Hanley Elementary #2	PK–5	Aspire Public Schools	Memphis	2013
Cornerstone Prep – Denver Campus	K–5	Capstone Education Group	Memphis	2015
Cornerstone Prep – Lester Campus	PK–5	Capstone Education Group	Memphis	2012
Corning Achievement Elementary School	PK–5	Achievement Schools	Memphis	2012
Frayser Achievement Elementary School	PK–5	Achievement Schools	Memphis	2012
Georgian Hills Achievement Elementary School	PK–5	Achievement Schools	Memphis	2013
KIPP Memphis Academy Elementary	K–2	KIPP Memphis Collegiate Schools	Memphis	2013
KIPP Memphis Preparatory Elementary	K–1	KIPP Memphis Collegiate Schools	Memphis	2015
Klondike Preparatory Academy	K–5	Gestalt Community Schools	Memphis	2013
Libertas School at Brookmeade	PK–2	Libertas School of Memphis	Memphis	2015
Memphis Scholars Caldwell-Guthrie	PK–5	Memphis Scholars	Memphis	2016
Memphis Scholars Florida-Kansas	K–5	Memphis Scholars	Memphis	2015
Promise Academy-Spring Hill	PK–3	Promise Academy	Memphis	2013
Whitney Achievement Elementary School	PK–5	Achievement Schools	Memphis	2013

Middle school
School	Grades	School operator	Location	Year opened
Brick Church College Prep	5–8	LEAD Public Schools	Nashville	2012
Humes Preparatory Academy	6–8	Gestalt Community Schools	Memphis	2012
KIPP Memphis Preparatory Middle	5–7	KIPP Memphis Collegiate Schools	Memphis	2013
KIPP Memphis University Middle	6–7	KIPP Memphis Collegiate Schools	Memphis	2014
Lester Prep	6–8	Capstone Education Group	Memphis	2014
Memphis Scholars Raleigh-Egypt	6–8	Memphis Scholars	Memphis	2016
Neely's Bend College Prep	5–6	LEAD Public Schools	Nashville	2015
Westside Achievement Middle School	6–8	Achievement Schools	Memphis	2012

High school
School	Grades	School operator	Location	Year opened
Fairley High School	9–12	Green Dot Public Schools	Memphis	2014
GRAD Academy Memphis	9–12	Project Grad USA	Memphis	2013
Martin Luther King Jr. College Preparatory High School	9–12	Frayser Community Schools	Memphis	2014

Alternative
School	Grades	School operator	Location	Year opened
Pathways in Education–Memphis in Frayser	9–12	Pathways in Education	Memphis	2014
Pathways in Education–Memphis in Whitehaven	9–12	Pathways in Education	Memphis	2015

== School operators ==
- Achievement Schools
- Aspire Public Schools
- Capstone Education Group
- Frayser Community Schools
- Freedom Preparatory Academy
- Gestalt Community Schools
- Green Dot Public Schools
- KIPP Memphis Collegiate Schools
- LEAD Public Schools
- Libertas School of Memphis
- Memphis Scholars
- Project GRAD
- Pathways in Education
- Promise Academy
- Rocketship Education
