= Southland Mall (Memphis, Tennessee) =

Shopping mall in Tennessee, U.S.

Coordinates: 35°1′9.3″N 90°1′19.0″W

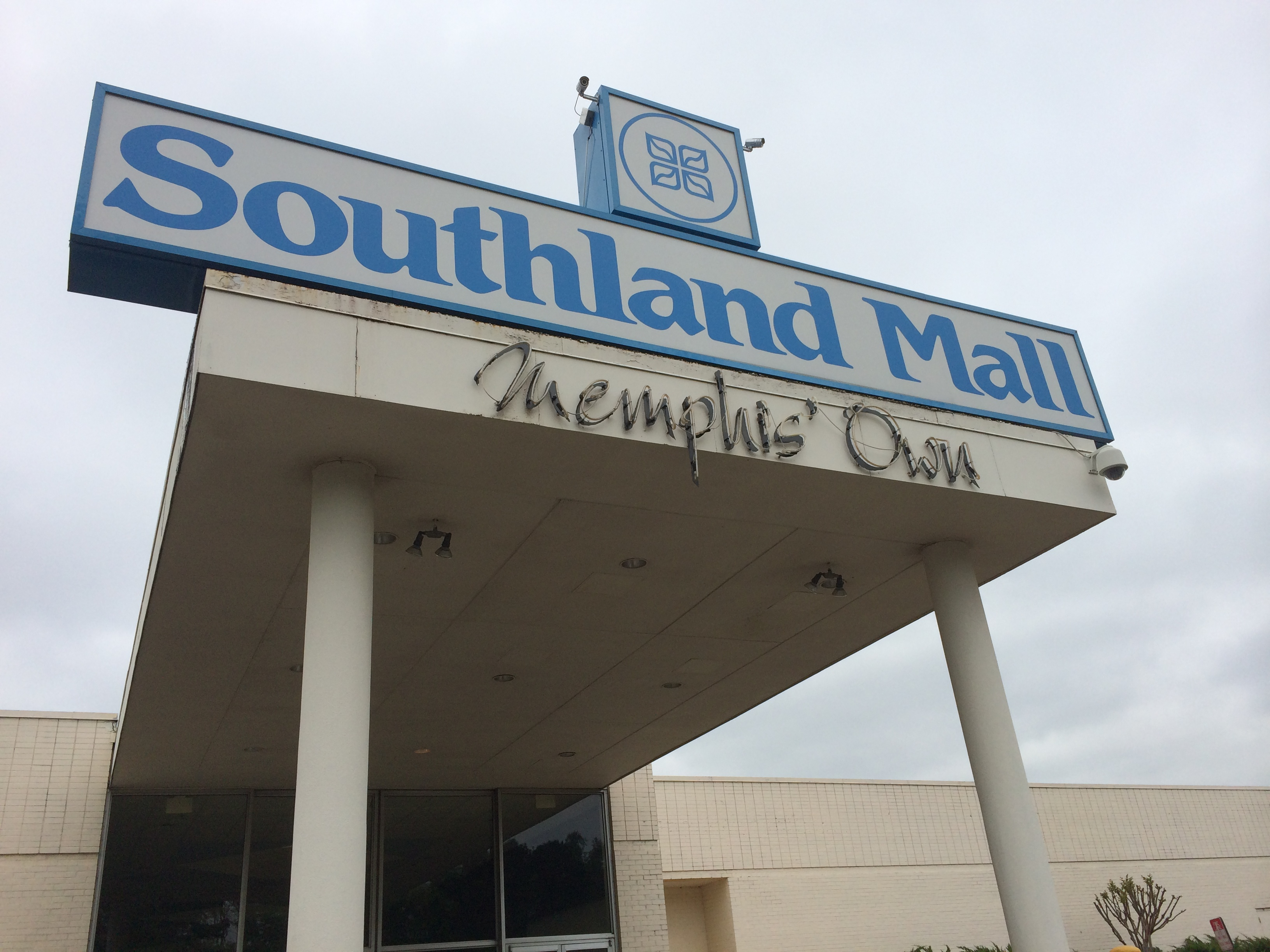
- Entrance to Southland Mall, April 2015
- Location: Memphis, Tennessee, United States
- Address: Elvis Presley Blvd at E. Shelby Drive
- Opened: 1966
- Developer: Joseph Meyerhoff
- Manager: Mason Asset Management
- Owner: Namdar Realty Group
- Num. of stores: 60+
- Num. of anchor tenants: 2 (1 open, 1 vacant)
- Floor area: 220,115 square feet (20,449.4 m^{2})
- Floors: 1
- Public transit: MATA
- Website: www.southlandmallmemphis.com

Southland Mall is a regional shopping mall in the Whitehaven neighborhood of South Memphis, Tennessee. It was built in 1966, becoming the first enclosed mall in the Mid-South. It is managed and owned by Namdar Realty Group. There are over 60 stores. There is one anchor store that is Public Storage. There is one vacant anchors last occupied by Macy's.

On January 9, 2015, it was announced that Macy's would be closing as part of a plan to close 14 stores nationwide. The store closed in early Spring 2015.

On November 8, 2018, it was announced that Sears would also be closing in February 2019 as part of a plan to close 40 stores nationwide.

In the 2020s, Public Storage announced they would open a storage facility inside the former Sears anchor building. Public Storage renovated the building and opened in early 2023. Plans were also announced at that same time to open more stores at the mall such as Starbucks and AutoZone. Both stores also opened in early 2023.

== See also ==
List of shopping malls in Tennessee
