= Frayser, Memphis =

Neighborhood in Memphis, Tennessee, United States

- Neighborhood
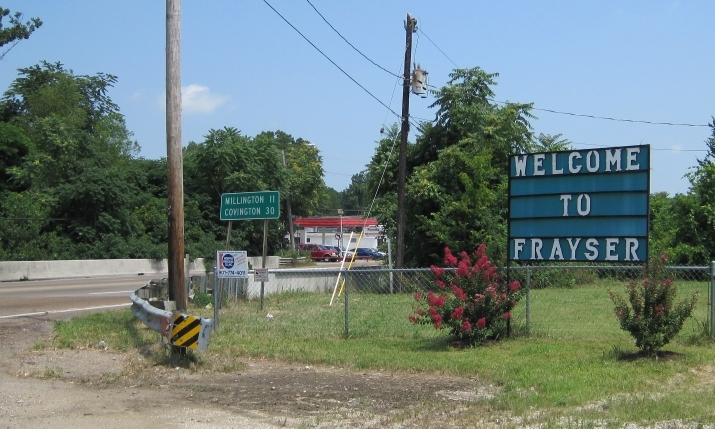
- "Welcome to Frayser" sign on U.S. Route 51.

- Location within Tennessee Location within the United States
- Coordinates: 35°13′03″N 90°00′12″W
- Country: United States
- State: Tennessee
- County: Shelby

Area
  - Total: 20.73 sq mi (53.7 km^{2})
- Elevation: 313 ft (95 m)

Population
  - Total: 45,000
- ZIP Code: 38127
- Area code: 901

Frayser is a neighborhood on the north side of Memphis, Tennessee, United States. It is named after Memphis physician J. W. Frayser, who owned a summer home near the railroad. Frayser's boundaries are the Wolf River to the south, the Mississippi River to the west, the Loosahatchie River to the north, and ICRR tracks to the east. The population of Frayser is approximately 45,000.

== History ==
The area was settled in the 1820s, with a station on the Illinois Central Railroad line being built by the 1870s. The first urban subdivision, named Rugby Hill Estates, was created in the 1890s along with a private water and sewage system, but was not commercially successful. A second subdivision was created in 1929 in the west portion of Frayser.

In 1942, International Harvester constructed a manufacturing plant west of Benjestown Road. This plant along with others, such as Firestone, south of Frayser helped spark housing demand in the community. The population of Frayser grew from 2,450 in 1940 to 16,000 in 1953. Frayser High School was built in 1949 to handle the demand for public schools.

The Memphis City Commission passed an ordinance authorizing the annexation of most of Frayser on April 30, 1957. The annexation formally went into effect on January 1, 1958. In the mid-1960s, the northern and western boundaries of the area were also absorbed by Memphis.

In March 1983, Firestone closed their tire factory in North Memphis and International Harvester closed their plant in 1985.

== Education ==
Most of the public schools in Frayser are served by Memphis-Shelby County Schools system. Elementary schools include, Hawkins Mill, Delano, Georgian Hills, and Lucie E Campbell Elementary Schools. Middle schools include Grandview Heights, Westside and Georgian Hills Middle Schools. Frayser is also home to two public high schools, Trezevant High School and Martin Luther King Jr. College Preparatory High School.

=== Private education ===
With the state changes in the education process, the Achievement School District was created and a number of school agencies sprouted in the Frayser Community including charter schools and a Montessori school. In February 2012, the Achievement School District announced that it planned to take over management of Corning Elementary School, Frayser Elementary School, and Westside Middle school in Frayser.

Frayser is also home to the Memphis Business Academy (MBA) middle and high school. MBA opened Memphis STEM Academy in August 2016.

=== Higher education ===
Frayser was home to Southwest Tennessee Community College's Gill Campus, which was located in the northeastern quadrant of the neighborhood. About 350 students were enrolled there in 2013. However, enrollment declined and the building was sold to Libertas School of Memphis in 2024.

== Parks and recreation ==
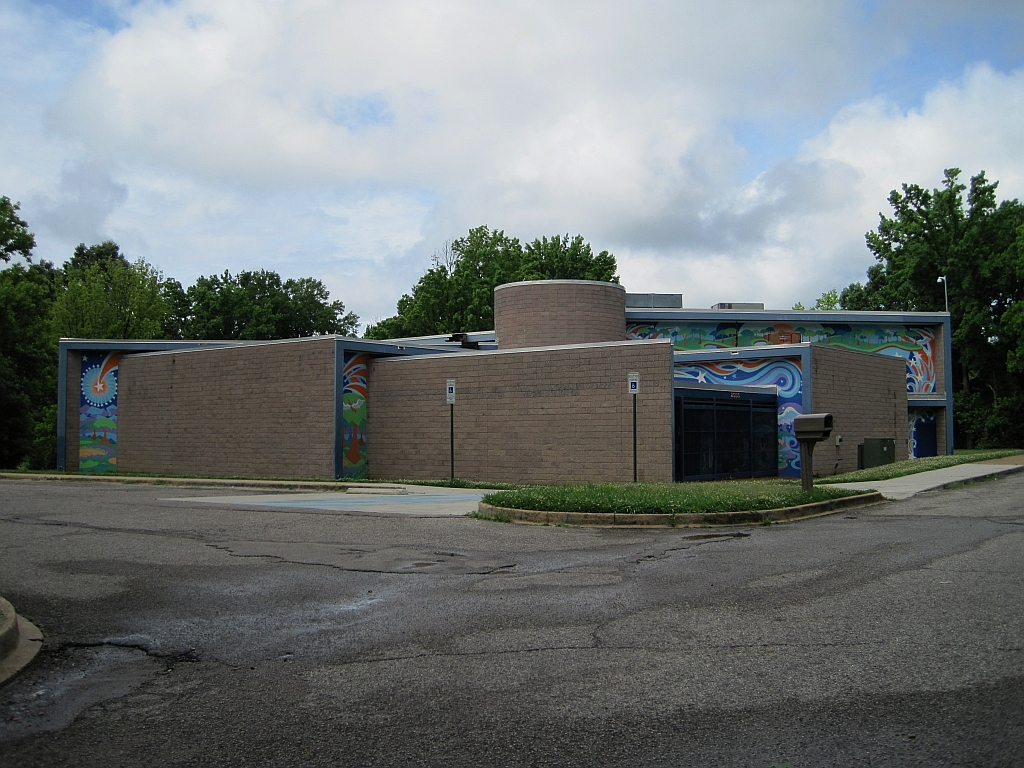
North Frayser Community Center

There are two community centers and 19 public parks in Frayser, totaling 870 acres (3.5 km^{2}). The Ed Rice Community Center was built in 1965. The original building was demolished in 2020 as part of an $8.4 million renovation that was completed in 2026. Rodney Baber Park on the south side of the neighborhood was also expanded in 2026, featuring new soccer fields, a pavilion, and a fishing pond.

== Transportation ==
Frayser is served by four MATA bus routes, numbered 11, 32, 40, and 42. Central and northeast Frayser are also served by Ready! demand-responsive service, which is operated by MATA.

Interstate I-40 runs through the southern reaches of Frayser. US 51/SR 3 bisects the western quadrants of the neighborhood. Frayser entirely encapsulates SR 300, which connects US 51 to I-40 exit 2A. Frayser also serves as the southern terminus of SR 388. The neighborhood is also home to General DeWitt Spain Airport.
