= Parkway Village, Memphis =

Neighborhood of Memphis, Tennessee

Coordinates: 35.066°N 89.911°W

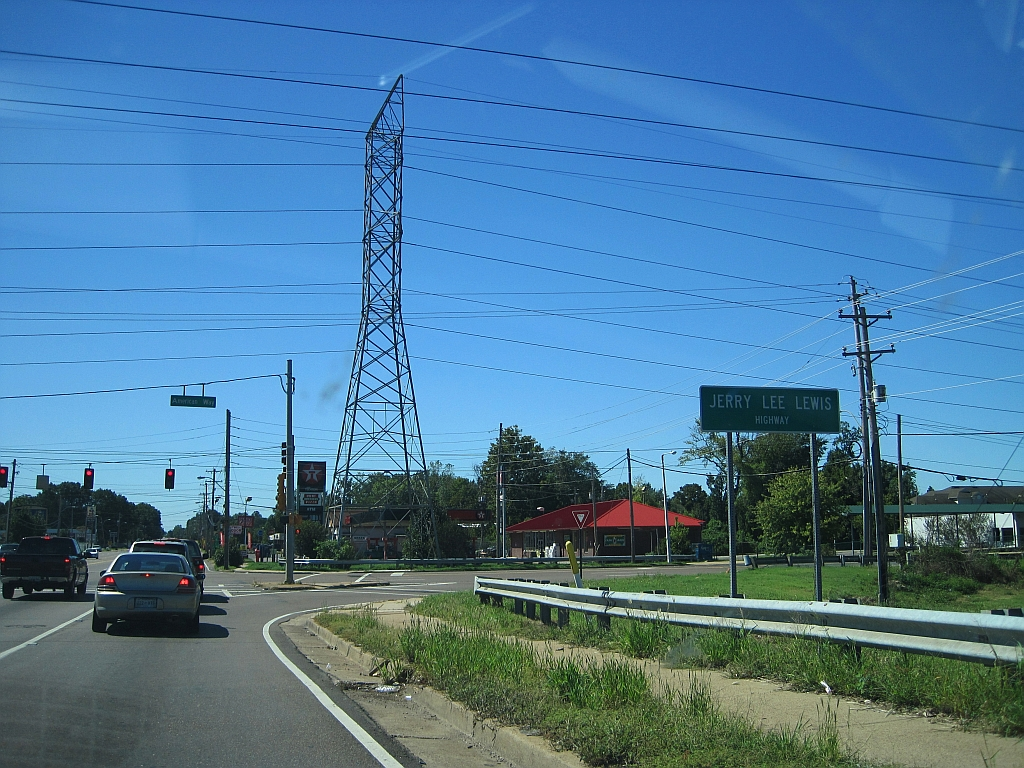
Jerry Lee Lewis Highway in Parkway Village

Parkway Village is a predominantly African-American community in southeast Memphis, Tennessee, United States. Parkway Village is bounded by Getwell Road and Lamar Avenue on the west, Winchester Road on the south, I-240 on the north, and Mendenhall Road on the east. The former Mall of Memphis was in the Parkway Village community.

In 1956, developers began to develop the farmland that is now Parkway Village for "gracious suburban living". Parkway Village remained a quiet community with little crime and well-kept neighborhoods throughout most of the 1980s. In the late 1980s it became a neighborhood in transition and crime rates began to rise.

Parkway Village is in the 38118 zip code. The population is primarily African-American, younger, and mostly single. in 2025, the average listed home value ($135,800) is lower than in the Memphis metro area as a whole ($219,900).
