= Wolfchase Galleria =

Coordinates: 35°12′3.4″N 89°47′15.9″W

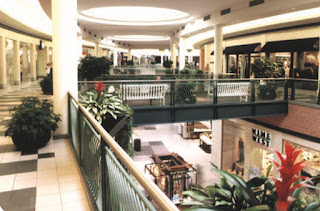
- 1990s concourse
- Location: Memphis, Tennessee, U.S.
- Address: 2760 N. Germantown Parkway
- Opened: February 26, 1997; 29 years ago
- Developer: Urban Retail Properties
- Manager: Simon Property Group
- Owner: Simon Property Group
- Num. of stores: 117
- Num. of anchor tenants: 6
- Floor area: 1,151,615 sq ft (106,988.5 m^{2}) (GLA)
- Floors: 2
- Public transit: MATA
- Website: Wolfchase Galleria

Wolfchase Galleria is a regional shopping mall in northeast Memphis, Tennessee, United States. The mall is managed by Simon Property Group. It is located across the street from the Bartlett city limits at the intersection of Germantown Parkway and Interstate 40. Wolfchase Galleria features 117 stores and a food court. The anchor stores are Macy's, JCPenney, Dillard's, Malco Theatres, and Primark. There is an trampoline and amusement center called Lululand Adventure Park that is currently under construction on the upper floor of the former Sears.

Before Sears closed, in 2015, Sears Holdings spun off 235 of its properties, including the Sears at Wolfchase Galleria, into Seritage Growth Properties.

On October 15, 2018, it was announced that Sears would be closing as part of a plan to close 142 stores nationwide. Primark bought the former Sears space on the lower floor and renovated it into their store. Primark opened on July 24, 2025.

Shortly after Primark opened, Lululand Adventure Park, an amusement center, announced they would be opening on the upper floor of the former Sears anchor space. The store is expected to open in 2026. Lululand Adventure Park is expected to be around 75,000 square feet.

== Anchors ==
=== Current ===
- JCPenney
- Macy's
- Dillard's
- Primark
- Lululand Adventure Park (currently under construction)

=== Former ===
- Sears
- Goldsmith's

== See also ==
- List of shopping malls in Tennessee
