= Senator Ford (disambiguation) =

Wendell Ford (1924–2015) was a U.S. Senator from Kentucky from 1974 to 1999. Senator Ford may also refer to:

- Aaron Ford (Nevada politician) (born 1972), Nevada state senator (2013-2018)
- Budd S. Ford (1840–1879), Maryland State Senate
- Carl Ford (politician) (born 1957), North Carolina State Senate
- Charles Ford (Oklahoma politician) (1931–2021), Oklahoma State Senate
- David C. Ford (1949–2008), Indiana State Senate
- Ed Ford (politician) (1930–2010), Kentucky State Senate
- Edward Hastings Ford, as the fictional character Senator Ford on Can You Top This?
- Henry Ford (Michigan legislator) (1825–1894), Michigan State Senate
- J. D. Ford (born 1982), Indiana State Senate
- Joel D. M. Ford (born 1969), North Carolina Senate
- John Salmon Ford (1815–1897), Texas State Senate
- John Ford (New York politician) (1862–1941), New York State Senate
- John Ford (Oklahoma politician) (fl. 2000s–2010s), Oklahoma State Senate
- John Ford (Tennessee politician) (born 1942), Tennessee State Senate
- Jon Ford (American politician) (born 1972), Indiana State Senate
- Ophelia Ford (born 1950), Tennessee State Senate
- Robert Ford (politician) (born 1948), South Carolina State Senate
- Seabury Ford (1801–1855), Ohio State Senate
- Tirey L. Ford (1857–1928), California State Senate
- William D. Ford (1927–2004), Michigan State Senate

== See also ==
- Captain Ford
- Mayor Ford
- President Gerald Ford (1913–2006)
- General Ford
- Judge Ford (disambiguation)
- Justice Ford (disambiguation)
- Governor Ford (disambiguation)
