= John Ford (Tennessee politician) =

American politician (born 1942)

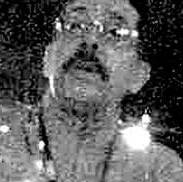
- Ford being investigated as part of Operation Tennessee Waltz

Member of the Tennessee Senate from the 29th district
- In office 1974 – May 28, 2005
- Succeeded by: Ophelia Ford

Personal details
- Born: May 3, 1942 (age 84) Memphis, Tennessee, U.S.
- Party: Democratic
- Relatives: Ford family

John Newton Ford (born May 3, 1942 in Memphis, Tennessee), is a former Democratic member of the Tennessee State Senate and a member of Tennessee's most prominent African-American political family. He is the older brother of former U.S. Representative Harold Ford, Sr. and the uncle of former Tennessee U.S. Representative and 2006 United States Senate candidate Harold Ford, Jr.

In April 2007, Ford was convicted of federal bribery as part of the Operation Tennessee Waltz scandal. He served 52 months of a 66-month sentence in U.S. federal prison, from April 2008 to August 2012. Ford resigned from the Tennessee State Senate on May 28, 2005, in a letter to Lieutenant Governor of Tennessee, John S. Wilder.

== The family ==
Six of Ford family patriarch N. J. Ford's sons and one daughter have been active in elective politics:

- Harold Ford, Sr. was, in 1974, the first African American elected to Congress from Tennessee since Reconstruction. He served until 1997.
- Harold Ford, Sr. was succeeded by his son, Harold Ford, Jr.
- Joe Ford has long been involved in local politics. He was a Shelby County Commissioner and served as interim mayor of Shelby County in 2009 and 2010.
- James Ford, now deceased, was a Shelby County commissioner.
- Emmitt Ford served several terms as a member of the Tennessee House of Representatives.
- Ed Ford served two terms on the Memphis City Council.
- Ed Ford Jr. succeeded his father on the Memphis City Council.
- Justin Ford, Ed Ford's nephew, served on the Shelby County Board of Commissioners.
- Ophelia Ford served as a state senator in the Tennessee General Assembly, representing District 29 from 2005 to 2014.

== Early life ==
Ford grew up with 11 brothers and sisters on Horn Lake Road in the West Junction neighborhood of South Memphis and graduated from Geeter High School in 1960. He attended Tennessee State University in Nashville, graduating with a bachelor's degree in 1964. Ford attended John A. Gupton College in Nashville, receiving an associate's degree in mortuary science, qualifying him to apply for a license as a funeral director.

Ford attended Memphis State University (now the University of Memphis), where he was active in Alpha Phi Alpha fraternity, and earned a master's degree in 1978. He is a member of the National Association for the Advancement of Colored People.

== Political career ==
Ford was first elected to the Memphis City Council in 1971 representing South Memphis District 6 and served until 1979. He was elected to the Tennessee Senate in 1974, the same year his brother, Harold Sr., was elected to the U.S. House of Representatives.

Ford was re-elected state senator seven times, rarely facing serious opposition. He served in the senate for more than 30 years. He was elected as Shelby County General Sessions Court Clerk, serving from 1992 to 1996.

In the state senate, Ford was chairman of the General Welfare, Health, and Human Resources Committee. Ford became prominent in the National Conference of State Legislators and the National Caucus of Black State Legislators, where he served as chairman of the Shelby County legislative delegation. He also served one term as Speaker pro Tempore of the Tennessee Senate.

== Bribery conviction ==
On May 26, 2005, Ford was arrested by the FBI, along with two other Tennessee state senators, a Tennessee state representative, a former state senator, a Chattanooga school board member, and an African-American political activist, for alleged participation in a bribery scheme utilizing a "sting" operation involving a bogus electronics recycling company lobbying for favorable treatment under state law. Known as Operation Tennessee Waltz, the sting operation resulted in multiple charges being brought against Ford and other politicians. His arrest came the day after his nephew Harold Ford, Jr., announced his candidacy for the United States Senate.

On April 27, 2007, Ford was convicted by a federal jury in Memphis of accepting $55,000 in bribes. The jury deadlocked on the more serious charge of extortion, creating a mistrial on that count. He was acquitted on three counts of witness intimidation.

On August 28, 2007, Ford was sentenced to 66 months in federal prison, to be followed by two years of supervised release. He was also facing corruption charges in Nashville, Tennessee for accepting bribes totaling more than $800,000 from medical contractors doing business with the state.

On April 29, 2008, Ford reported to U.S. federal prison in Louisiana. On April 14, 2011, the Sixth Circuit Court of Appeals overturned a portion of the convictions against Ford on jurisdictional grounds. He was released from prison in August 2012.
