= Ophelia Ford =

American politician (born 1950)

Member of the Tennessee Senate from the 29th district
- In office 2005–2014
- Preceded by: John Ford
- Succeeded by: Lee Harris

Personal details
- Born: July 5, 1950 (age 76) Memphis, Tennessee, U.S.
- Party: Democratic
- Relatives: Ford family
- Education: Tennessee State University
- Profession: Funeral director; insurance agent; politician

Ophelia Ford (born July 5, 1950) is a former member of the Tennessee Senate. She is the younger sister of former state senator John Ford and former Congressman Harold Ford, Sr., and the aunt of former Congressman Harold Ford, Jr. She represented Senate District 29, which covers South Memphis and North Memphis.

== Biography ==
John Ford, who had been a member of the Tennessee Senate for over 30 years, resigned in 2005 after he was indicted in Operation Tennessee Waltz. Ophelia Ford ran for her brother's state senate seat and defeated State Representative Henri Brooks by 20 votes in the special Democratic primary. She went on to defeat Republican candidate Terry Roland by 13 votes in the special general election. Both elections fell under allegations of improprieties. Names of deceased persons and felons were found on the rolls, and dozens of additional votes were counted from voters living outside the district. Further investigation of the election revealed that one of the election officials purportedly certifying the name of many of the voters in question was actually in New York City the day of the election and that her place was taken, without authorization, by a relative.

The Tennessee Senate initially voted along party lines to void the election. Ophelia Ford sued the State Senate and obtained an injunction from a federal court which upheld the election until the senate met provisions under the Voting Rights Act. The State Senate, having authorization to so act from the court’s order, voted to void the election by a margin of 26-6, on April 19, 2006.

Under Tennessee State law, the process of filling the district’s seat became the responsibility of the Shelby County Commission. Ophelia Ford vowed further legal action to regain the seat. On April 25, 2006, Ford filed a federal suit in an attempt to regain her seat.

The Tennessee Bureau of Investigation investigated aspects of the election, and District Attorney Bill Gibbons obtained 37 indictments, 35 of which are felonies, against three Shelby County poll workers for alleged election fraud. Ford herself was not implicated.

For the 2006 election, she moved to a district on the other side of Memphis and won it (her old district had been renumbered as District 33).

On May 22, 2007, a Nashville cab driver accused Ophelia Ford of grabbing his shirt collar and ripping a button off his shirt while driving Ms. Ford to her hotel. He claimed that Ms. Ford was intoxicated.

She is often cited for her outrageous opinions such as her accusations about Tennessee nurses harming patients on a daily basis and doing things to her as a patient that "are so horrible you would not believe it". She made these accusations as a response to a 2012 proposal to increase penalties for assaults on healthcare workers. Ford argued patients are the ones who need protection from nurses.
