= Emmitt Ford =

American politician (1943–2014)

Member of the Tennessee House of Representatives from the 86th district
- In office 1975–1981
- Preceded by: Harold Ford Sr. (5th district)
- Succeeded by: Rufus E. Jones

Personal details
- Born: December 13, 1943 Memphis, Tennessee
- Died: November 10, 2014 (aged 70) Memphis, Tennessee
- Party: Democratic
- Education: Tennessee State University

Emmitt H. Ford (December 13, 1943 – November 10, 2014) was an American politician from Tennessee. He represented the 86th district encompassing Shelby County from 1975–1981. He was also an uncle of former United States Congressman Harold Ford Jr.

== Early life ==
Ford was one of twelve children born to N. J. and Vera Ford. Growing up in the West Junction and Riverside neighborhoods of South Memphis, he graduated from Geeter High School. Also, he attended Tennessee State University.

== Political career and legal problems ==
He succeeded his brother Harold Ford Sr. as a member of the Tennessee State House of Representatives from the 86th district, but resigned in 1981 after a conviction for fraud. Rufus E. Jones was named to Ford's seat. Ford was sentenced to federal prison in 2000 for tax evasion.

== Life after politics ==
For over twenty years, he operated a meat market in South Memphis. He died at Methodist Hospital in Memphis, Tennessee on November 10, 2014.
