= Ford family (Tennessee) =

Political family in Memphis, Tennessee

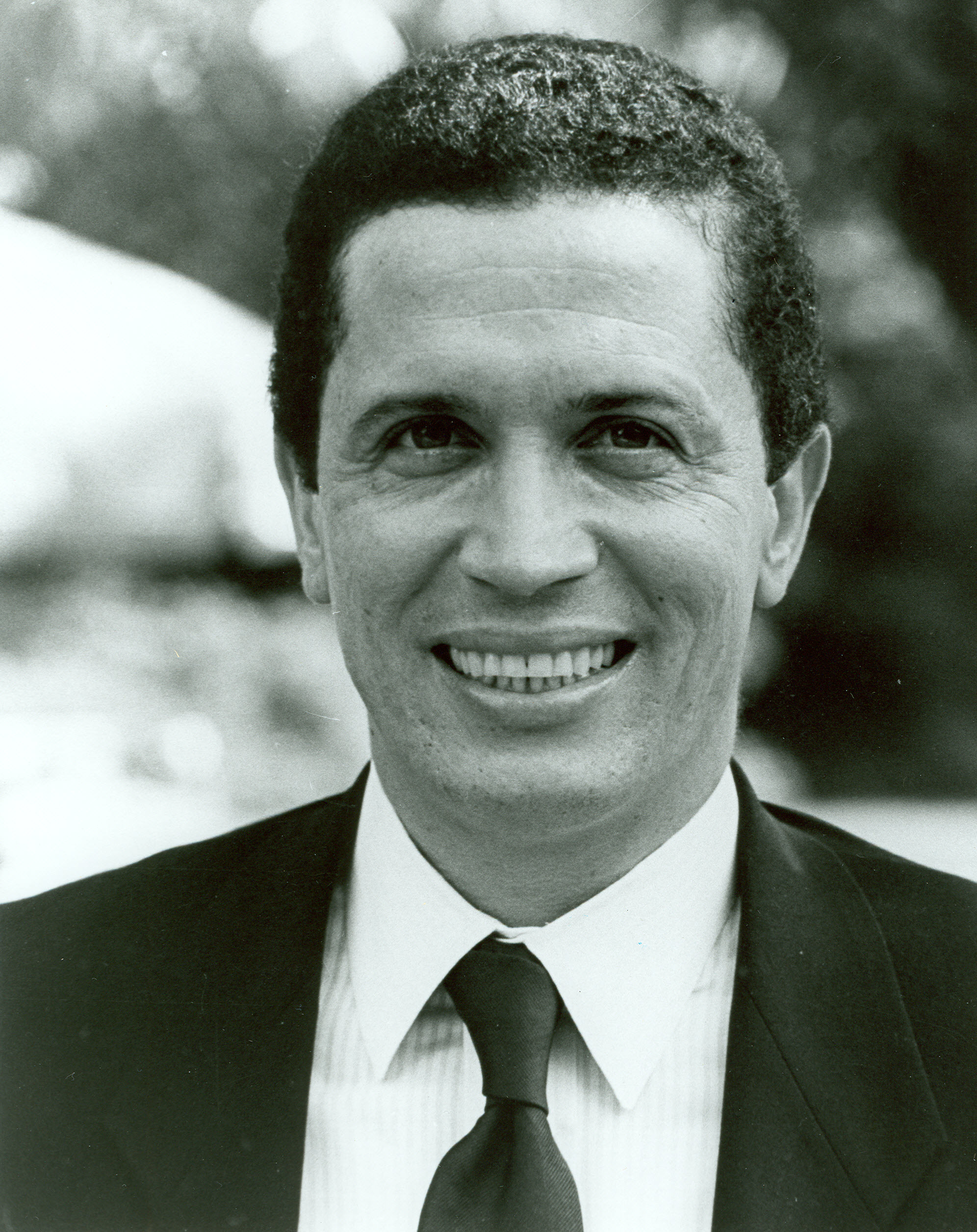
Harold Ford, Sr., member of the United States House of Representatives.

The Ford family is an African-American political family from Memphis, Tennessee. Members of the family have held federal, state, county and municipal offices in Tennessee, including seats in the United States House of Representatives, the Tennessee General Assembly, the Shelby County government and the Memphis City Council.

== History ==
The family's political influence grew from its base in South Memphis and from the family funeral business founded by Newton Jackson Ford. The Tennessee General Assembly described N.J. Ford & Sons Funeral Parlor as an established Memphis business and identified N.J. Ford and Vera Ford as the parents of thirteen children, including John, Emmitt, Harold, James, Ophelia, Joseph and Edmund Ford.

The family's modern political rise began in the 1970s. In 1974, three Ford brothers won elected office: Harold Ford Sr. was elected to Congress, John Ford was elected to the Tennessee Senate, and Emmitt Ford was elected to the Tennessee House of Representatives. Harold Ford Sr. became the first African American elected to Congress from Tennessee and later was succeeded by his son, Harold Ford Jr., making him the first African-American member of Congress to be succeeded by a son.

The Los Angeles Times described the Fords as once being "the leading African-American political dynasty in Tennessee" and reported that a Memphis City Council seat became known locally as the "Ford seat" after it was held by John, James, Joseph and Edmund Ford.

== Notable members ==
- Newton Ford was an ancestor of the family and held county office in Shelby County.
- Newton Jackson Ford was a Memphis undertaker and founder of N.J. Ford Funeral Parlor, later N.J. Ford & Sons Funeral Parlor. He and his wife, Vera Davis Ford, were the parents of thirteen children.
- Harold Ford Sr. represented Tennessee in the United States House of Representatives from 1975 to 1997. He previously served in the Tennessee House of Representatives from 1970 to 1975.
- Harold Ford Jr., son of Harold Ford Sr., represented Tennessee's 9th congressional district in the U.S. House from 1997 to 2007. He ran unsuccessfully for the United States Senate in 2006.
- John Ford served on the Memphis City Council and later served more than thirty years in the Tennessee Senate.
- Emmitt Ford served in the Tennessee House of Representatives.
- James Ford served on the Memphis City Council and later on the Shelby County Commission.
- Joseph "Joe" Ford served on the Memphis City Council and the Shelby County Commission, and was appointed interim Shelby County mayor in 2009.
- Justin J. Ford, son of Joe Ford, was elected to the Shelby County Board of Commissioners in 2010 and re-elected in 2014.
- Edmund Ford Sr. was first elected to the Memphis City Council in 1999 and was re-elected in 2019 to represent District 6.
- Edmund Ford Jr., son of Edmund Ford Sr., served on the Memphis City Council and later on the Shelby County Commission.
- Ophelia Ford served in the Tennessee Senate, representing District 29 in Shelby County.

== See also ==
- List of United States political families
