= Rufus E. Jones =

American politician and businessman (1940–2019)

Member of the Tennessee House of Representatives from the 86th district
- In office 1981–1996
- Preceded by: Emmitt Ford
- Succeeded by: Barbara Cooper

Personal details
- Born: August 21, 1940 Memphis, Tennessee
- Died: October 20, 2019 (aged 79) Memphis, Tennessee
- Party: Democratic
- Spouse: Marvis Kneeland-Jones
- Education: Michigan State University
- Profession: Grocer

Rufus E. Jones (August 21, 1940 – October 20, 2019) was an American politician and businessman.

== Early life ==
Jones grew up in the Boxtown neighborhood of South Memphis where his father operated Jones Supermarket. As a youngster, he went in the grocery business with his father. Jones and his father also operated another South Memphis grocery store, Jones Big Star. He graduated from Booker T. Washington High School and Michigan State University.

== Political career ==
Jones succeeded his childhood friend Emmitt Ford in the Tennessee House of Representatives and served from 1981 to 1996. He was a Democrat. He was succeeded by Barbara Cooper. Jones was the Tennessean delegate to the Democratic National Convention in 1996.

== Personal ==
He was married to Marvis Kneeland-Jones, a retired schoolteacher. She was a member of the Memphis State Eight, the first group of African-American students to attend the University of Memphis, five years after the Supreme Court ruled in favor of desegregation in Brown v. Board of Education.
