= Lois DeBerry =

American politician (1945–2013)

Speaker Pro-tempore of the Tennessee House of Representatives
- In office January 13, 1987 – January 11, 2011
- Succeeded by: Judd Matheny

Member of the Tennessee House of Representatives from the 91st district
- In office January 9, 1973 – July 18, 2013
- Preceded by: Constituency established (Note: Before 1973, Tennessee apportioned many of its state representatives by county rather than district. Due to this apportionment method, Tennessee had no specific 91st House district, even though it had 99 representatives.)
- Succeeded by: Raumesh Akbari

Personal details
- Born: Lois Marie DeBerry; May 5, 1945 Memphis, Tennessee, U.S.
- Died: July 28, 2013 (aged 68) Memphis, Tennessee, U.S.
- Party: Democratic
- Spouse: Charles Traughber
- Children: 1
- Education: LeMoyne-Owen College (BA)
- Website: House website

Lois Marie DeBerry (May 5, 1945 – July 28, 2013) was an American politician who was a member of Tennessee House of Representatives and former Speaker Pro Tempore of the Tennessee House. She was elected to represent the 91st district, part of Shelby County, as a Democrat. She was first elected to the Tennessee General Assembly in 1972 and was at the time of her death the longest serving member of the House.

DeBerry was the second African American woman to serve in the Tennessee General Assembly and the first woman to be speaker pro tempore of the House.

== Early life and education ==
Lois DeBerry was born in Memphis, Tennessee, on May 5, 1945, the second of the five children of Samuel DeBerry and the former Mary Page. Her father was a self-employed trucker. She grew up in the Bunker Hill neighborhood of South Memphis and graduated from Hamilton High School.

During the 1960s, Lois DeBerry became engaged in the civil rights movement. In spite of objections from her parents, she participated in the August 28, 1963, March on Washington, various student sit-ins, and a Selma to Montgomery march in 1965.

In 1971, she graduated from LeMoyne-Owen College with a Bachelor of Arts degree in elementary education.

== Political career ==
DeBerry became a candidate for public office in 1972 after becoming disillusioned by her experiences working as a counselor in a federally funded project, where she was one of the few African Americans working with a client population that was almost entirely African American. She was one of five candidates for the state House of Representatives in the 91st District, which had been newly defined by redistricting after the 1970 census. With support from U.S. Representative Harold Ford, Sr., she defeated the four male candidates, and took office in the 88th Tennessee General Assembly that was convened in 1973.

She had represented the 91st district from 1973 until her death. As of 2011 she was the longest-serving member of the Tennessee House. In addition to serving on the House committees listed in the following paragraph, she was also Chair of the Special Committee to Study Integration of Ex-Offenders into Mainstream of Society, a member of the Governor's Juvenile Justice Reform Commission, and a member of the Governor's Minority Business Development Advisory Committee.

In the 2007-2008 legislative session she served on the House Calendar and Rules Committee; the House Government Operations Committee; the House Health & Human Resources Committee; the House Rules Committee; the House Finance, Ways and Means Committee; the House Ethics Committee; the House Budget Subcommittee; the House Health Care Facilities Subcommittee; the House Public Health and Family Assistance Subcommittee; the House Elections Subcommittee; the Joint Select Committee on Children and Youth; the Joint Select Oversight Committee on Corrections; and the House Committee to Study School Safety Issues.

Lois DeBerry worked as an educator. She was President Emeritus of National Black Caucus of State Legislators. She was the first African-American woman elected to serve in the Tennessee House of Representatives from the city of Memphis, the first chairwoman of the Shelby County Delegation, and the first African-American woman to be elected speaker pro tempore of the House of Representatives.

== Personal life ==
DeBerry married Charles Traughber, chairman of the Tennessee state parole board, in 1981. She had one son, Michael "Boogaloo" Boyer, Jr., from a previous marriage. DeBerry died after a nearly five-year battle with pancreatic cancer on July 28, 2013, at a hospital in Memphis. She was a member of Delta Sigma Theta sorority.

== Political views ==
Lois DeBerry co-sponsored a bill in May 2005 that would have required parents to volunteer in schools for at least 12 hours per year. She voted in April 2004 for women to be required to wait 24 hours and receive counseling before having an abortion. She voted against a bill in March 2004 that would have banned civil unions and domestic partnerships in Tennessee. In May 1999, she proposed a bill that restricted credit card companies from soliciting on college and university campuses. She was a close friend of former Vice President Al Gore for at least 25 years, and she put in his nomination for president at the Democratic National Convention.

== Controversies ==
DeBerry accepted $200 from an undercover FBI agent posing as a businessman during Operation Tennessee Waltz, while celebrating a birthday with fellow Representative Kathryn I. Bowers in 2004. DeBerry defended the decision, saying she did nothing wrong, and that she thought the money was a birthday present. As a result of the incident, she stepped down from the Joint Legislative Committee on Ethics.

== Notes ==
Tennessee House of Representatives
Preceded by Creation of district	Tennessee State Representative, 91st District; 1972–2013	Succeeded by Raumesh Akbari
