= Jeff Yarbro =

American politician (born 1977)

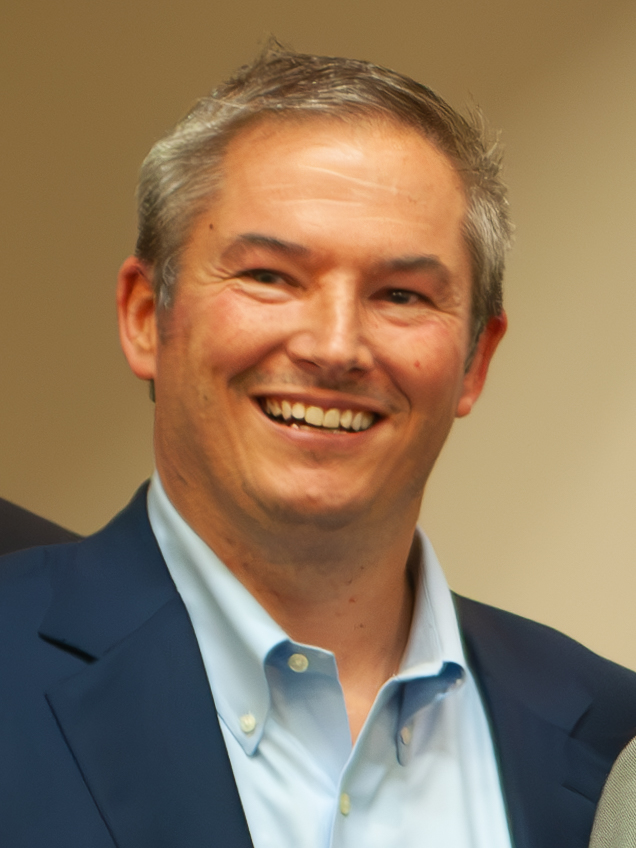
- Yarbro in 2023

Minority Leader of the Tennessee Senate
- In office January 8, 2019 – January 10, 2023
- Preceded by: Lee Harris
- Succeeded by: Raumesh Akbari

Member of the Tennessee Senate from the 21st district
- Incumbent
- Assumed office January 13, 2015
- Preceded by: Douglas Henry

Personal details
- Born: February 16, 1977 (age 49) Dyersburg, Tennessee, U.S.
- Party: Democratic
- Education: Harvard University (BA); University of Virginia (JD)

Jeff Yarbro (born February 16, 1977) is an American attorney and politician from Tennessee. A member of the Democratic Party, he has represented District 21 in the Tennessee Senate since 2015, and served as Senate Minority Leader between 2019 and 2023. In 2023, Yarbro ran for Mayor of Nashville in the 2023 election, finishing in fourth place.

== Early life and education ==
Jeff Yarbro was born in Dyersburg, Tennessee, his father, Paul Yarbro, a farmer; and his mother, Joetta, a sexual abuse investigator for the state. As a child, he attended public schools. After graduating from high school in 1995, he attended Harvard University, where he earned a B.A. in government with honors. He met his wife on the campaign trail, and after the election they both went on to pursue law degrees at the University of Virginia. While studying law, he served as Editor-in-Chief of the Virginia Law Review. Upon graduation, he was awarded the Thomas Marshall Miller Prize.

== Career ==
Yarbro clerked for Judge Gilbert Merritt of the United States Court of Appeals for the Sixth Circuit. He began practicing law at the firm Bass, Berry & Sims in Nashville. He assisted in implementing the firm's formal pro bono program. Yarbo's work defending an inmate on death row helped gain recognition for his firm by the bar for outstanding service to the indigent. Yarbro primarily focuses on civil and appellate litigation, consumer financial services, constitutional law, and public contracts.

== Political activity ==
Yarbro worked on the New Hampshire Primary on the Advance Staff, and was the assistant to the chief political strategist for Democratic candidate Al Gore's presidential campaign in 2000. He was also the GOTV director for Harold Ford Jr.'s 2006 run for the United States Senate. Recently, Yarbro served as an education policy adviser to Nashville Mayor Karl Dean, and received the PENCIL Foundation 's Volunteer of the Year award for 2010–11 for his work with public education. In his first campaign for public office in 2010, Yarbro came within seventeen votes of defeating forty-year incumbent Senator Douglas Henry, who retained his seat as the state senator for Tennessee's twenty-first district. He beat Mary Mancini in the 2014 Democratic primary in the 21st district of Tennessee to go on and win the general election to join the 109th General Assembly.

Yarbro is a co-chair of Superintendent Jesse Register's Transformational Leadership Group for high schools in Nashville. He is also one of the founding board members of East End Prep, co-founder of Nashville's Kitchen Cabinet, serves as co-chair for the Conexion Americas capital campaign for the Casa Azafran community center, and the chair of the Metropolitan Transit Authority board in Nashville.

He rain for Metropolitan Mayor of Nashville in summer 2023 and was disqualified after coming in fourth place with 12.19 percent of the vote with 12,356 votes in total.

Tennessee Senate
Preceded by Lee Harris	Minority Leader of the Tennessee Senate; 2019–2023	Succeeded by Raumesh Akbari
