= South Memphis prostitute killings =

Unsolved serial murders

Memphis prostitute killer
- A digital reconstruction of the killer's face
- Wanted since: January 27, 2011; 15 years ago

Details
- Victims: 3, possibly 4
- Span of crimes: January 27 – February 26, 2011 (possibly September 2015)
- Country: United States
- State: Tennessee
- Location: Memphis

The South Memphis prostitute killings were a series of killings that occurred throughout South Memphis, Tennessee, in early 2011. Within the span of a month, four female sex workers were shot, three of them fatally, by an unidentified assailant. The murder of a fourth woman in the same area in 2015 may also be linked to the case, but no arrests have been made thus far.

== Murders ==
Beginning on January 27, 2011, South Memphis was struck by a series of seemingly random shootings targeting female prostitutes. At around 2:15 a.m. that day, the body of 31-year-old Tamakia McKinney was found near Mt. Carmel Cemetery; she had been shot to death. McKinney, a mother of two, had no known arrests for prostitution, but her family stated that they had known she was a prostitute and had told her husband. At around 12:05 p.m. on February 20, a woman flagged down a police vehicle and led them to the body of 28-year-old Jessica Lewis, which was inside Mt. Carmel Cemetery; also a prostitute, she too had been shot to death.

At around 5:45 a.m. on February 24, officers patrolling the area around Mt. Carmel Cemetery found the body of 44-year-old Rhonda Wells, who had been shot to death. Wells, a prostitute, had been living with her grandmother prior to her death. At around 7:30 p.m. on February 26, the killer struck for the last time when he shot 26-year-old Katrina Peterson. Peterson survived and ran four blocks, finding safety and being rushed to Regional Medical Center, where she slowly recovered.

== Investigation ==
Peterson, the only surviving victim, assisted police in making an identikit of her attacker. From her description, the person who shot her was a young black man, around 24-years-old and wearing his hair in cornrows. He drove a dark vehicle, either a Dodge Charger or Chrysler 300. Memphis police suspected the four cases were linked to a serial killer, and police released the sketch to the public in an effort to help find him. At each scene, DNA from the same man was recovered; according to police, however, the DNA was unable to lead to the conclusion that this man was the killer because the victims were prostitutes. The DNA was later entered into the Combined DNA Index System, but no other attacks were linked to the case.

=== 2015 killing ===
On September 16, 2015, 25-year-old Juanita Gilmore was found stabbed to death in a South Memphis cemetery. According to the Memphis Flyer, the murder could be linked to the 2011 murders due to Gilmore having been a former sex worker; however, according to homicide detective Robert Wilkie, the fact that Gilmore was stabbed and not shot leads him to believe the murder was unrelated to the others, and that the personal nature of a stabbing indicated that Gilmore was likely killed by someone she knew. As of yet, none of the murders have been solved.

== See also ==
- List of serial killers in the United States
