= Boxtown, Memphis =

Neighborhood in South Memphis

Coordinates: 35.048°N 90.124°W

Boxtown is a neighborhood in South Memphis, Memphis, Tennessee near T. O. Fuller State Park. The oldest section of South Memphis, Boxtown includes White's Chapel AME Church, built in 1890. Boxtown has numerous shotgun houses.

== Boundaries ==
The main boundary of Boxtown is Sewanee Road to the east.

== History ==
Boxtown began as a community for emancipated enslaved people and freedmen soon after the signing the Emancipation Proclamation in 1863, in Shelby County on the southern boundary of the City of Memphis. Boxtown was so-named because its houses resembled railroad boxcars. A number of residents opened grocery stores, the most notable of whom was S.L. Jones (1914–1991), who opened a grocery at the corner of Sewanee Road and Fields Road. He later opened Jones Big Star on McLemore Avenue. On December 31, 1971, Boxtown was annexed by the City of Memphis after a failed annexation attempt in 1968. A number of families have lived in the area for generations, notably the Rogers family and White Family, for whom White's Chapel Church was named.

In December 2019, Plains All American Pipeline and Valero Energy Corporation announced their plans to build the Byhalia Connection Pipeline. This pipeline would start in southwest Memphis to Marshall county, Mississippi, crossing through Boxtown. After being referred to as the “path of least resistance,” The people of Boxtown raised concerns about this new pipeline and protested until the project was canceled in July 2021.

The neighborhood is home to an xAI datacenter which opened in the early 2020's. The datacenter has been accused by residents of being a large source of air pollution.
