= Lee Harris (politician) =

American politician (born 1978)

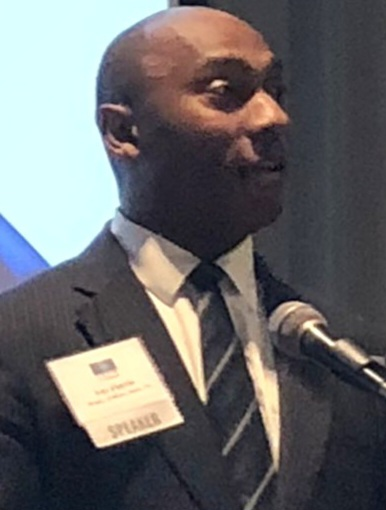
- Harris in 2018

7th Mayor of Shelby County
- Incumbent
- Assumed office September 1, 2018
- Preceded by: Mark Luttrell

Minority Leader of the Tennessee Senate
- In office January 13, 2015 – August 31, 2018
- Preceded by: Jim Kyle
- Succeeded by: Jeff Yarbro

Member of the Tennessee Senate from the 29th district
- In office January 13, 2015 – August 31, 2018
- Preceded by: Ophelia Ford
- Succeeded by: Raumesh Akbari

Member of the Memphis City Council from the 7th district
- In office 2011–2015
- Preceded by: Berlin Boyd
- Succeeded by: Berlin Boyd

Personal details
- Born: August 10, 1978 (age 48) Memphis, Tennessee, U.S.
- Party: Democratic
- Education: Morehouse College (BA); Yale University (JD)

Lee Ardrey Harris (born August 10, 1978) is an American politician who currently serves as the Mayor of Shelby County, previously serving as a member of the Tennessee Senate, representing the 29th district. Harris is also a law professor. Prior to his election to the state senate, Harris represented District 7 on the Memphis City Council. He was born and raised in Memphis, and studied at Morehouse College, followed by Yale Law School.

In 2014, he was elected to the Tennessee Senate to replace Ophelia Ford. He was elected in November 2014 by the Democratic Senate Caucus of the Tennessee State Senate to the leadership position of Senate Minority Leader. He is the first black lawmaker of either party to hold a leadership position in the Tennessee State Senate. In 2018, Harris was the Democratic nominee for Mayor of Shelby County, defeating Republican David Lenoir. He was re-elected to a second term in 2022.

== Early life and education ==
Harris was born and raised in Memphis, Tennessee. He is the son of a retired high school guidance counselor and a heating and air conditioning repairman. He attended Memphis city schools, including Alcy Elementary School, John P. Freeman Middle School, and Overton High School. Harris attended Morehouse College on a full scholarship, graduating in 2000. While at Morehouse, Harris completed a one-year course of study at the London School of Economics. He graduated from Yale Law School in 2003.

== Career ==
Harris began his legal career as an associate at Baker, Donelson, Bearman, Caldwell & Berkowitz, a Memphis law firm. In 2003, Harris began teaching at the University of Memphis, School of Law, attaining tenure in 2009. Harris teaches and publishes in the fields of corporate law.

In 2006, Harris unsuccessfully ran for the U.S. House of Representatives for Tennessee's 9th congressional district.

In 2011, Harris faced Kemba Ford in a runoff election for Memphis City Council. He won the race with more than 60% of the vote.

On April 3, 2014, Harris announced his intention to contest a Tennessee State Senate District 29 seat currently held by state Senator Ophelia Ford. Harris was elected to the seat and was sworn in in January 2015. He was elected by his colleagues in the Democratic Caucus of the Tennessee State Senate to be Senate Minority Leader for the session. He is the first black lawmaker of either party to hold a leadership position in the Tennessee State Senate.

In 2018, Harris was the Democratic nominee for Shelby County Mayor. He won the general election, defeating Republican Shelby County Trustee David Lenoir 55-45%. Harris' campaign emphasized reducing poverty and expanding education, including access to jobs training and apprenticeships. During his first term, Harris raised the minimum wage for Shelby County employees and oversaw the county's response to the COVID-19 pandemic. He also increased funding for early childhood education and created a paid parental leave program for county employees.

Harris ran for re-election in 2022. He faced Republican Worth Morgan, a member of the Memphis City Council. The campaign centered around the county's crime rate and health care infrastructure. Harris defeated Morgan 58-42%

== Policy positions ==
Harris was a proponent of an October 16, 2012, amendment to Memphis' anti-discrimination ordinance, which prohibits the City of Memphis from discriminating on the basis of age, disability, national origin, ethnicity, gender identity, and sexual orientation.

In September 2025, Harris expressed strong opposition to the planned deployment of National Guard federal forces to Memphis with semi-automatic weapons.

== Books ==
- Corporations and Other Business Entities: a Practical Approach (2011) ISBN 9780735596368
- Mastering Corporations and Other Business Entities (1997) ISBN 978-1594604447

Tennessee Senate
Preceded by Jim Kyle	Minority Leader of the Tennessee Senate; 2015–2018	Succeeded by Jeff Yarbro
