= Raumesh Akbari =

American politician (born 1984)

- Akbari in 2026

Minority Leader of the Tennessee Senate
- Incumbent
- Assumed office January 10, 2023
- Preceded by: Jeff Yarbro

Member of the Tennessee Senate from the 29th district
- Incumbent
- Assumed office January 8, 2019
- Preceded by: Lee Harris

Member of the Tennessee House of Representatives from the 91st district
- In office November 2013 – January 8, 2019
- Preceded by: Lois DeBerry
- Succeeded by: London Lamar

Personal details
- Born: April 14, 1984 (age 42) Memphis, Tennessee, U.S.
- Party: Democratic
- Education: Washington University (BA); Saint Louis University (JD)
- Website: Official website

Raumesh Aleza Akbari (ruh-MESH ack-BERRY) (born April 14, 1984) is an American politician and member of the Tennessee Senate for the 29th district since 2019. She was formerly a member of the Tennessee House of Representatives for the 91st district. She currently serves as First Vice Chair of the Education Committee, and a member of the Commerce and Labor Committee, and the Ethics Subcommittee. She is a member of the Democratic Party.

== Early life and education ==
Akbari was born in Memphis, Tennessee to parents Lisa and Hooshang, both professional trichologists. Her father is from Iran, and her mother is from Memphis. She has a fraternal twin, Raumina.

Akbari is a 2002 graduate of Cordova High School in Memphis, Tennessee. She attended Washington University in St. Louis, where she graduated in 2006 with a BA in African American studies and a minor in political science. In 2009, Akbari received her Juris Doctor from St. Louis University School of Law. She currently directs legal affairs and human resources for Akbari Corp., a small business founded by her parents in 1981. Akbari is a member of Delta Sigma Theta sorority and The Links.

== Career ==
Akbari was elected to the Tennessee House of Representatives in 2013 following a special election. She served in the state House for three terms until her 2018 election to the Tennessee State Senate.

Akbari is a member of the Ben F. Jones Chapter of the National Bar Association, National First Vice President of the National Organization of Black Elected Legislative Women (N.O.B.E.L Women), NewDEAL, National Black Caucus of State Legislators, and the Democratic Party of Shelby County.

In 2015, Akbari was elected by her peers to serve Tennessee as the state co-director of Women in Government, a national non-profit, non-partisan organization of female state legislators. In 2017, she was selected by the Tennessee Black Caucus of State Legislators to serve as that organization's Chair. Akbari currently serves as the President-Elect of the National Black Caucus of State Legislators.

Akbari was selected as one of 17 speakers to jointly deliver the keynote address at the 2020 Democratic National Convention. She also delivered an address at the 2016 Democratic National Convention.

In 2019, Akbari was selected to be a Marshall Memorial Fellow in Europe for the German Marshall Fund.

== Criminal justice reform ==
In 2017, Akbari introduced legislation to ban lifetime prison sentences for minors. Akbari advocated for the successful 2019 clemency of Cyntoia Brown and reintroduced the legislation in 2019. Akbari has also advocated for cash bail reform, eliminating mandatory minimum sentences, and progressive sentencing laws.

In 2020, President Biden appointed Akbari to a national criminal justice reform task force.

== Public policy ==
Akbari's policy agendas have focused on criminal justice reform, economic development in underserved communities, healthcare expansion, and public education investment.

Akbari has advocated for the expansion of Tennessee's Medicaid program, as well as a state-level law that would ensure women receive equal pay for equal work.

Following a 2014 incident at the Galilee Cemetery in Memphis, Akbari sponsored legislation to streamline burial practices, allowing families to know where a loved one is buried.

In early 2014, Shelby County Schools announced a plan to close 13 campuses in southwest and northwest Memphis, including Alcy Elementary. A "Save-Alcy" group was formed by Akbari and other parent and community volunteers with the goal of keeping Alcy Elementary open. After a month of negotiations, the board reversed its decision to close the Alcy campus citing the more than 60 community leaders who stepped-up and committed to volunteer at least three hours at the elementary school each week. For her efforts, Akbari was hailed as a "champion of a school rarely in the limelight."

Akbari has also worked to restore historic local grave sites, including those at Mount Carmel and Hollywood cemeteries which were previously inaccessible due to overgrowth.

== Personal life ==
Akbari resides in Memphis. She is an active volunteer with Meals on Wheels through the Metropolitan Inter-Faith Association. Akbari is a Baptist.

Tennessee House of Representatives
Preceded by Lois DeBerry	Member of the Tennessee House of Representatives from the 91st district 2013-2019	Succeeded by London Lamar
Tennessee Senate
Preceded by Lee Harris	Member of the Tennessee Senate from the 29th district 2019–present	Incumbent
Preceded by Jeff Yarbro	Minority Leader of the Tennessee Senate; 2023–present	Incumbent
Party political offices
Preceded by Elizabeth Warren	Keynote Speaker of the Democratic National Convention; 2020; Served alongside: Stacey Abrams, Colin Allred, Brendan Boyle, Yvanna Cancela, Kathleen Clyde, Nikki Fried, Robert Garcia, Malcolm Kenyatta, Marlon Kimpson, Conor Lamb, Mari Manoogian, Victoria Neave, Jonathan Nez, Sam Park, Denny Ruprecht, Randall Woodfin	Succeeded by Angela Alsobrooks
