= 2006 United States Senate election in Tennessee =

- November 7, 2006
- Turnout: 49.97% ▼13.06 pp
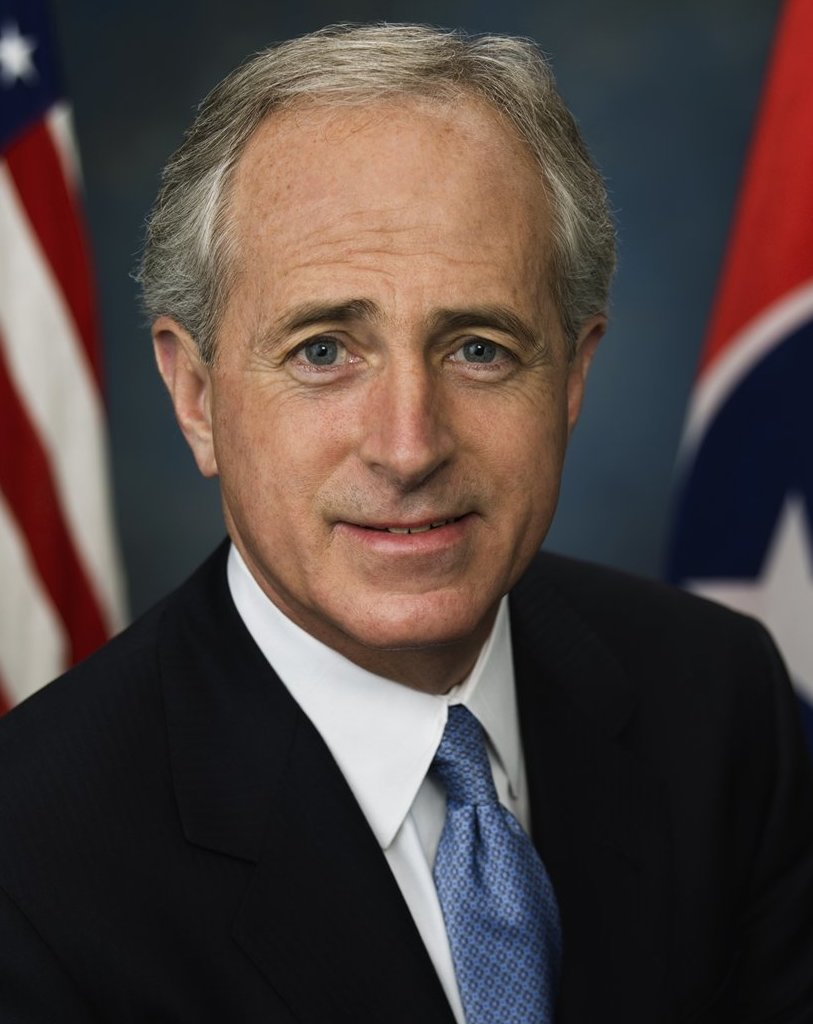

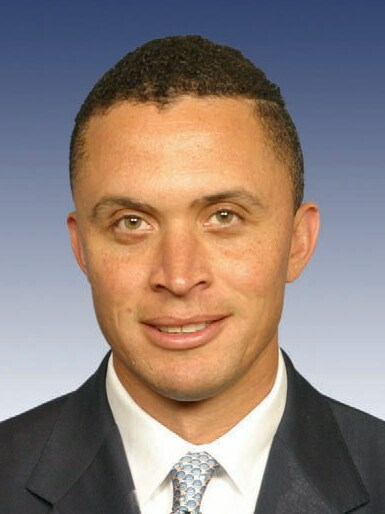
Nominee	Bob Corker	Harold Ford Jr.
Party	Republican	Democratic
Popular vote	929,911	879,972
Percentage	50.71%	47.99%
- Corker: 40–50% 50–60% 60–70% 70–80% 80–90% Ford: 40–50% 50–60% 60–70% 70–80% 80–90% >90% Tie: 40–50% No data
U.S. senator before election
Bill Frist
Republican
Elected U.S. Senator
Bob Corker
Republican

The 2006 United States Senate election in Tennessee was held on November 7, 2006. Incumbent Republican Senator Bill Frist, the majority leader, retired after two terms in office. The open seat was won by Republican nominee Bob Corker, who defeated Democratic nominee Harold Ford Jr.

The race between Ford and Corker was one of the most competitive Senate races of 2006, with Corker winning the race by less than three percent of the vote. Corker was the only non-incumbent Republican to win a U.S. Senate seat in 2006, becoming the only freshman Republican senator in the 110th Congress. Since 1995, the Republican Party has held both of Tennessee's U.S. Senate seats.

This was the last Tennessee statewide election decided by a single-digit margin until 2026. The Republican Party had gained intense strength since 2006, as in other predominantly white, rural Southeast regions. Since 2006, only seven of Tennessee's 95 counties (Davidson, Shelby, Haywood, Hardeman, Houston, Jackson, and Lake) have voted for the Democratic candidate in any statewide election, with Jackson and Lake only voting Democratic once. Only three of these (Davidson, Shelby, and Haywood) have voted Democratic in a Senate race since 2006.

== Republican primary ==
=== Candidates ===
- Ed Bryant, former U.S. representative
- Bob Corker, businessman, former mayor of Chattanooga and candidate for U.S. Senate in 1994
- Van Hilleary, former U.S. representative and nominee for governor of Tennessee in 2002

All three candidates had run prior unsuccessful statewide campaigns: Corker for Senate in 1994, losing the Republican primary to Frist; Bryant for Senate in 2002, losing the Republican primary to Lamar Alexander; and Hilleary for governor in 2002, losing the general election to Democrat Phil Bredesen.

=== Campaign ===
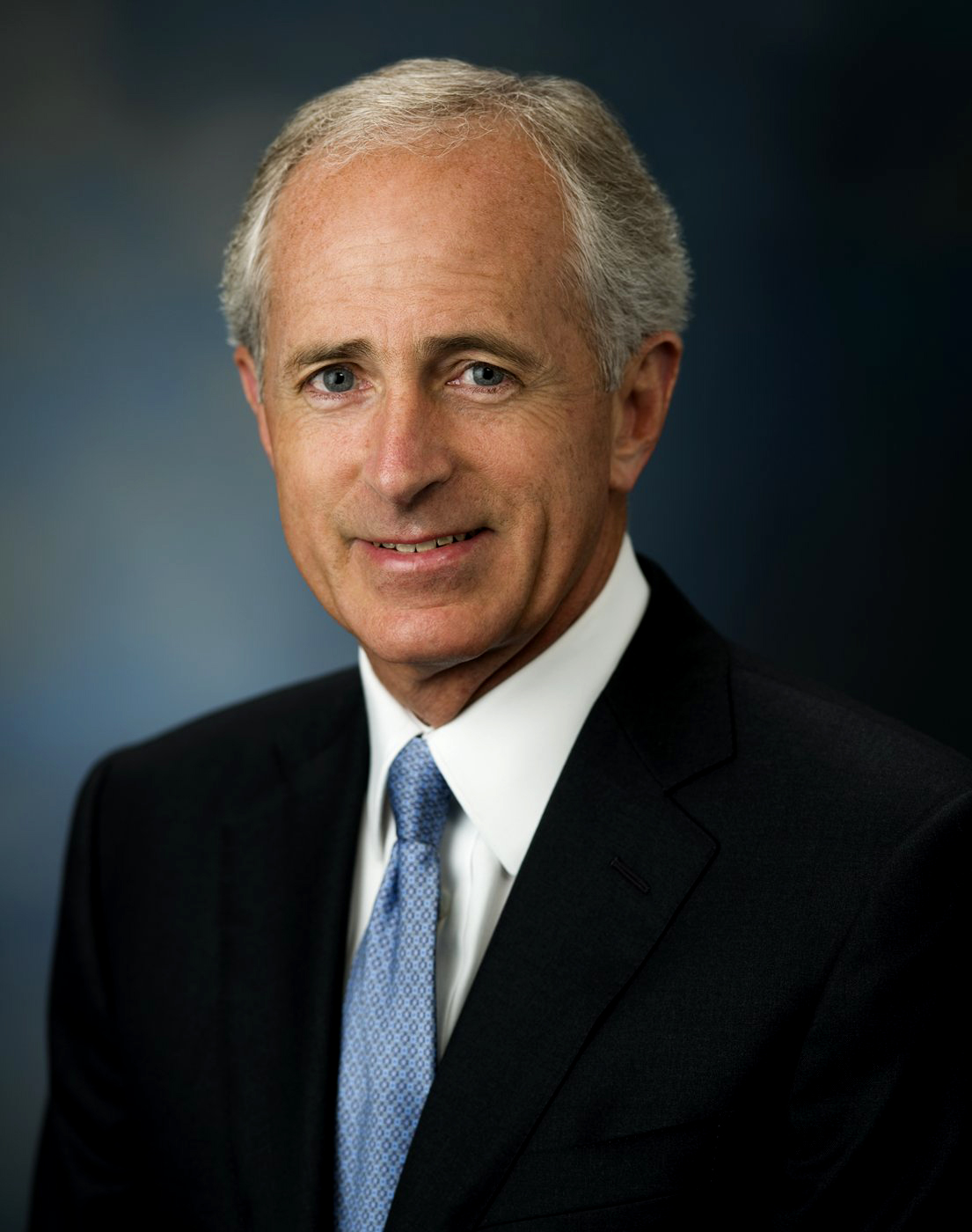
Election winner Bob Corker

Only 11 percent of Tennesseans knew who Corker was when he began running for the Senate race.

=== Debates ===
The three Republican candidates met for a debate at the University of Tennessee campus in Knoxville on June 29, 2006. All three expressed skepticism regarding global warming and recent publication of scientific consensus on the issue, supported continued American involvement in Iraq, opposed income tax increases, and "showed varying degrees of interest in replacing the federal income tax with a national sales tax," prompting Corker to state in his closing statement "there's not any difference, that I can tell, on the issues."

=== Polling ===
Source	Date	Hilleary	Bryant	Corker	Other	Undecided
City Paper/Supertalk 99.7 WTN	May 9, 2006	34%	23%	19%	—	24%
SurveyUSA	May 16, 2006	40%	28%	23%	—	9%
SurveyUSA	May 23, 2006	28%	23%	38%	—	8%
University of Tennessee	July 20, 2006	15%	26%	37%	4%	17%
Mason-Dixon/Chattanooga Times Free Press	July 23, 2006	22%	23%	39%	—	16%
SurveyUSA	July 24, 2006	15%	29%	49%	3%	4%
SurveyUSA	August 2, 2006	20%	31%	45%	1%	3%

=== Results ===
Republican primary results by county Corker: 30–40%; 40–50%; 50–60%; 60–70%; 70–80%; Bryant: 40–50%; 50–60%; 60–70%; 70–80%; Hilleary: 40–50%; 50–60%

Republican primary results
Party	Candidate	Votes	%
Republican	Bob Corker	231,541	48.13%
Republican	Ed Bryant	161,189	33.50%
Republican	Van Hilleary	83,078	17.27%
Republican	Tate Harrison	5,309	1.10%
Total votes		481,117	100.00%

== Democratic primary ==
=== Candidates ===
- Gary Gene Davis, perennial candidate
- Harold Ford Jr., U.S. representative
- John Jay Hooker, attorney, entrepreneur, and perennial candidate

==== Withdrew ====
- Rosalind Kurita, state senator from Clarksville

=== Campaign ===
Harold Ford was a congressman from the 9th Congressional District, based in Memphis, and a member of a political family, with many relatives also serving or formerly in political office. He was known nationally for his keynote address at the 2000 Democratic National Convention in Los Angeles, and for a challenge to Nancy Pelosi for leadership of the House Democrats in 2002. He had also served as a national campaign co-chair for the John Kerry presidential campaign in 2004.

Ford filed paperwork to run for the U.S. Senate in May 2005.

Democratic State Senator Rosalind Kurita, from the 22nd District, centered on Clarksville, Tennessee had entered the race prior to Ford, and initially appeared to be competitive, releasing internal polls showing her as strong as Ford in the general election. She dropped out of the race in early April 2006, as a result of financial and organizational challenges.

Ford enjoyed substantial support from Democratic leaders in Washington and Nashville and held a substantial lead in fundraising.

=== Results ===
Democratic primary results
Party	Candidate	Votes	%
Democratic	Harold Ford Jr.	333,789	79.10%
Democratic	Gary Gene Davis	41,802	9.91%
Democratic	John Jay Hooker	27,175	6.44%
Democratic	Charles Smith	14,724	3.49%
Democratic	Alvin Strauss	4,410	1.05%
Total votes		421,900	100.00%

== General election ==
=== Candidates ===
==== Major ====
- Ed Choate (I)
- Bob Corker (R), former mayor of Chattanooga
- Harold Ford Jr. (D), U.S. representative from Memphis
- Gary Keplinger (I)
- Bo Heyward (I)
- Chris Lugo (G), peace activist
- David "None of the Above" Gatchell (I)

=== Campaign ===
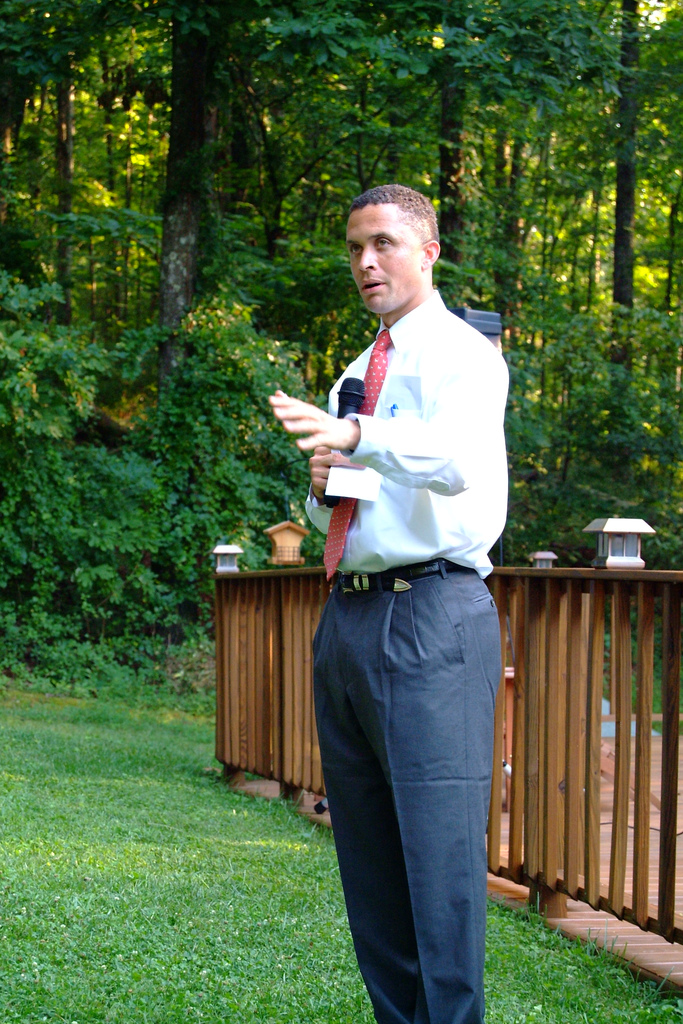
Harold Ford Jr. on the campaign trail

Not long after Corker's primary victory was assured, Ford, at a rally of his supporters attended by Bill Clinton, challenged Corker to seven televised debates across the state. In response, Corker said he would debate Ford, but did not agree to Ford's request of seven debates. Both of Corker's primary opponents endorsed Corker immediately after they conceded the race.

On August 8, 2006, the Tennessee Democratic Party filed a complaint with the Federal Election Commission against Corker for allegedly violating campaign financial disclosure rules.

On August 25, the Chattanooga Times Free Press reported that Corker had received a subpoena regarding an environmental lawsuit filed three years previously. The lawsuit centered on the actions Corker took as mayor to allegedly demolish a conservation site to build a road that leads to a Wal-Mart SuperCenter. Corker was scheduled to testify on October 18, but the case was settled on October 13.

Ford, a member of the Blue Dog Coalition in Congress, sought to run as a centrist, recognizing that Tennessee was a conservative state. While he was a member of a political dynasty in Memphis, this also served as a liability, as his state senator uncle was indicted on federal corruption charges the day after he announced his Senate candidacy.

On October 1, Corker replaced his campaign manager.

As the campaign entered October, Ford was leading in some polls. Despite running a strong campaign, he was hampered by his family's legal issues and the fact that his base was in West Tennessee, as opposed to Corker's base in East Tennessee.

Before a Corker press conference in Memphis on October 20, Ford confronted him in a parking lot about Iraq in front of local news cameras, pointing out that some of Corker's fellow Republicans were changing their minds on the war and wanted to debate him about the issue. In response, Corker said, "I came to talk about ethics, and I have a press conference. And I think it's a true sign of desperation that you would pull your bus up when I'm having a press conference." Ford replied that he could never find Corker. Corker then walked away to his press conference.

On November 2, Nielsen Monitor Plus indicated that the Corker campaign had purchased more television advertising than any other Senate candidate in the country through October 15.

=== Debates ===
Three debates were held between Corker and Ford. They participated in a televised debate in Memphis on October 7, in Chattanooga on October 10, and in Nashville on October 28.

In the October 7, 2006 debate in Memphis, the candidates covered a wide range of issues, including immigration, Iraq, health care costs, abortion, and Social Security. Commenting on Ford's political family, Corker said, "I think it's evident there's been a Ford in this [9th District congressional district] seat for 32 years, and if you look at the number of Fords that are on the ballot—especially I think the most recent one, I know it concerns a lot of people right here in Memphis." Ford responded, "I don't know why Mr. Corker keeps bringing up my family. . . . It's you and I running for the Senate. It's our ideas, our plans to make the future better for everybody. Let's stick to you and I. And if you come up with a recipe to pick family, say it. Otherwise be quiet and let's run for the Senate."

- Complete video of debate, October 7, 2006

The October 10 Chattanooga debate covered many of the same issues, with Corker again attempting to make Ford's family an issue and Ford claiming that Corker would be merely a "rubber stamp" for the Bush administration and Republican Party in the Senate.

- Complete video of debate, October 10, 2006

The final debate took place on October 28, in Nashville and mostly covered the economy.

- Complete video of debate, October 28, 2006

=== "Who Hasn't?" advertisement ===
"Harold, call me," says a blonde woman in RNC's controversial attack ad against Ford.

A negative ad titled "Who Hasn't?" sponsored by the Republican National Committee ("RNC") that aired during the third and fourth weeks of October gained national attention and was condemned by both Ford and Corker. The ad ridiculed Ford through interviews of fictional citizens giving deadpan endorsements that satirized Ford's policies and reputation, such as "terrorists need their privacy" and "taxes after I'm dead". The last of these is a scantily clad white woman (Johanna Goldsmith) acting as a Playboy bunny who "met Harold at the Playboy party", who invites Ford to "call me".

Responding to questions about the ad, a Ford spokesperson said that Ford went to a 2005 Playboy-sponsored Super Bowl party that was attended by more than 3,000 people, and Ford himself said that he likes "football and girls" and makes no apology for either.

The NAACP described the ad as "a powerful innuendo that plays to pre-existing prejudices about African-American men and white women", and former Republican Senator William Cohen called it "a very serious appeal to a racist sentiment. Corker condemned the RNC ad, calling it "tacky" and stating that his campaign has asked to have it pulled. The RNC, however, continued to endorse the ad, said it had no plans to stop airing it, and dismissed charges of racism, saying it "wouldn't even entertain the premise" that the ad was racist. In an October 24 interview with Tim Russert, RNC chairman Ken Mehlman said that he thought the ad was "fair" and that he did not have the authority to pull it.

The ad was also denounced by Canada's ambassador to the United States, Michael Wilson, and in the Parliament of Canada by MP Omar Alghabra. The ad became an issue in Canada because of an actor's statement in the advertisement, "Canada can take care of North Korea. They're not busy." Alghabra, in the House of Commons, responded, "Is this what Canadians should be expecting as the outcome of cozying up to Mr. Bush by the prime minister and his Conservatives?"

On October 25, Mehlman announced that the ad was "down now" during an interview with Wolf Blitzer on CNN. In its place, Tennessee television stations ran a different RNC ad.

=== Endorsements ===
Ford received endorsements from, among others, The Tennessean (Nashville's predominant daily newspaper), The Commercial Appeal (Memphis's predominant daily newspaper), the Jackson Sun (Jackson's predominant daily newspaper), the Bristol Herald Courier, Metro Pulse (Knoxville), the Professional Firefighters Association of Tennessee, and the Tennessee State Lodge of the Fraternal Order of Police.

Corker was endorsed by, among others, the NRA Political Victory Fund, the Knoxville News-Sentinel, the United States Chamber of Commerce, Clarksville Leaf Chronicle, Lebanon Democrat, Kingsport Times News, Nashville City Paper, the National Federation of Independent Businesses, and the National Right to Life Committee, though the Tennessee Right to Life Committee refused to endorse Corker, claiming he is a "pro-abortion" politician.

Both Corker and Ford were endorsed by the Chattanooga Times Free Press (Chattanooga's predominant daily newspaper, which still maintains two separate editorial pages left over from when its two daily newspapers merged): Ford by The Times editors, and Corker by Free Press editors.

Harold Ford Jr. (D)

Individuals

- Wesley Clark, general, 2004 Democratic presidential candidate

=== Fundraising ===
Through October 18, 2006, Corker had raised more money than Ford and had also spent more, according to the candidates' most recent filings with the Federal Election Commission (FEC). Corker tapped into his personal fortune to help fund his campaign, loaning his campaign a total of $4.1 million. Corker loaned $2 million of this amount on Wednesday, November 1, less than a week before the election, triggering the "millionaire's amendment" of the 2002 Campaign Reform Act and allowing Ford to seek $12,600 from individual donors instead of $2,100, the normal limit, for the final days of the campaign.

President Bush attended two fundraiser dinners on behalf of the Corker campaign in Nashville and Memphis, which raised $2.6 million by charging over $2,000 a plate. Former President Bill Clinton attended a rally for the Ford campaign in Nashville that raised about $1 million.

None of the third-party candidates filed reports with the FEC.

Candidate	Funds raised	Cash on hand
Bob Corker (R)	$13,145,585	$973,171
Harold Ford (D)	$9,889,498	$356,175

=== Predictions ===
Source	Ranking	As of
The Cook Political Report	Tossup	November 6, 2006
Sabato's Crystal Ball	Lean R	November 6, 2006
Rothenberg Political Report	Tossup	November 6, 2006
Real Clear Politics	Tossup	November 6, 2006

=== Polling ===
In the general election, polls showed Corker with a statistically insignificant lead in the week before the election.

Source	Date	Harold Ford Jr. (D)	Bob Corker (R)
Global Strategy Group	March 2005	39%	34%
Global Strategy Group	October 31, 2005	39%	36%
Rasmussen	December 20, 2005	42%	36%
Rasmussen	January 30, 2006	40%	42%
Rasmussen	March 6, 2006	35%	39%
Rasmussen	May 7, 2006	39%	43%
Zogby	June 13, 2006	42%	46%
Zogby/WSJ	June 21, 2006	41%	42%
University of Tennessee	July 20, 2006	35%	42%
Zogby/WSJ	July 24, 2006	44%	43%
Mason-Dixon	July 24, 2006	36%	49%
Rasmussen	July 26, 2006	37%	49%
Rasmussen	August 10, 2006	42%	48%
Benenson Strategy Group (D)	August 21, 2006	44%	42%
Zogby/WSJ	August 28, 2006	44%	48%
Rasmussen	September 5, 2006	44%	45%
Zogby/WSJ	September 11, 2006	43%	45%
SurveyUSA	September 11, 2006	48%	45%
Benenson Strategy Group (D)	September 23, 2006	45%	39%
Zogby/WSJ	September 25, 2006	42%	48%
Mason-Dixon	September 27, 2006	43%	42%
Middle Tennessee State University	September 30, 2006	42%	43%
Rasmussen	October 1, 2006	48%	43%
Reuters/Zogby	October 5, 2006	40%	40%
USA Today/Gallup (RV)	October 5, 2006	46%	36%
USA Today/Gallup (LV)	October 5, 2006	50%	45%
SurveyUSA	October 10, 2006	46%	48%
Hamilton Beattie (D)	October 10, 2006	51%	44%
Rasmussen	October 13, 2006	48%	46%
Zogby/The Wall Street Journal	October 19, 2006	42%	49%
Los Angeles Times/Bloomberg	October 24, 2006	44%	49%
Mason-Dixon/MSNBC-McClatchy	October 24, 2006	43%	45%
Rasmussen	October 24, 2006	46%	47%
SurveyUSA	October 25, 2006	48%	48%
Hamilton Beattie (D)	October 26, 2006	47%	45%
Benenson Strategy Group (D)	October 30, 2006	48%	43%
CNN	October 31, 2006	44%	52%
CNN	October 31, 2006	45%	47%
Zogby/The Wall Street Journal	October 31, 2006	48%	49%
Mason-Dixon	November 1, 2006	38%	50%
Rasmussen	November 1, 2006	47%	49%
Rasmussen	November 2, 2006	45%	53%
Reuters/Zogby	November 2, 2006	43%	53%
Hamilton Beattie (D)	November 3, 2006	46%	40%
Rasmussen	November 4, 2006	45%	53%
USA Today/Gallup	November 4, 2006	46%	49%
Survey USA	November 5, 2006	46%	51%
Rasmussen	November 5, 2006	47%	51%
OnPoint Polling and Research	November 6, 2006	47%	48%

=== Results ===
United States Senate election in Tennessee, 2006
Party	Candidate	Votes	%	±%
Republican	Bob Corker	929,911	50.71%	−14.39
Democratic	Harold Ford, Jr.	879,976	47.99%	+15.78
Independent	Ed Choate	10,831	0.59%	N/A
Independent	David Gatchell	3,746	0.20%	N/A
Independent	Emory "Bo" Heyward	3,580	0.20%	N/A
Independent	H. Gary Keplinger	3,033	0.17%	N/A
Green	Chris Lugo	2,589	0.14%	N/A
Write-in		29	0.00%	N/A
Majority		49,935	2.72%	
Turnout		1,833,695	49.97%	
Republican hold		Swing	-14.39	

=== By county ===
County	Bob Corker Republican		Harold Ford Jr. Democratic		Others Independent		Margin	Total votes
County	%	#	%	#	%	#	Margin	Total votes
Anderson	52.58%	12,349	46.03%	10,809	1.39%	326	1,540	23,484
Bedford	52.14%	5,602	45.90%	4,931	1.96%	211	671	10,744
Benton	39.44%	2,176	58.58%	3,232	1.98%	109	-1,056	5,517
Bledsoe	55.91%	2,210	42.80%	1,692	1.29%	51	518	3,953
Blount	61.28%	22,046	37.17%	13,372	1.55%	558	8,674	35,976
Bradley	68.31%	18,161	30.30%	8,057	1.39%	369	10,104	26,587
Campbell	50.07%	5,051	48.54%	4,896	1.39%	140	155	10,087
Cannon	44.89%	1,925	53.22%	2,282	1.89%	81	-357	4,288
Carroll	51.84%	4,742	46.53%	4,256	1.63%	149	486	9,147
Carter	64.02%	10,577	34.28%	5,664	1.70%	280	4,913	16,521
Cheatham	53.19%	6,134	44.62%	5,146	2.19%	253	988	11,533
Chester	61.05%	2,696	37.27%	1,646	1.68%	74	1,050	4,416
Claiborne	53.63%	4,112	44.68%	3,426	1.68%	129	686	7,667
Clay	40.81%	1,015	57.30%	1,425	1.89%	47	-410	2,487
Cocke	61.33%	5,952	36.71%	3,563	1.96%	190	2,389	9,705
Coffee	52.11%	8,069	46.16%	7,147	1.73%	267	922	15,483
Crockett	49.04%	2,212	49.79%	2,246	1.17%	53	-34	4,511
Cumberland	59.86%	11,515	38.84%	7,471	1.30%	250	4,044	19,236
Davidson	38.07%	67,136	60.59%	106,847	1.34%	2,374	-39,711	176,357
Decatur	49.43%	1,941	48.43%	1,902	2.14%	84	39	3,927
DeKalb	44.15%	2,450	54.05%	2,999	1.80%	100	-549	5,549
Dickson	48.25%	7,014	49.75%	7,232	2.00%	290	-218	14,536
Dyer	54.92%	6,115	43.54%	4,848	1.54%	171	1,267	11,134
Fayette	57.60%	7,296	41.65%	5,275	0.75%	95	2,021	12,666
Fentress	55.60%	2,918	42.62%	2,237	1.77%	93	681	5,248
Franklin	47.80%	6,142	50.40%	6,477	1.80%	231	-335	12,850
Gibson	50.98%	8,003	47.59%	7,471	1.43%	225	532	15,699
Giles	47.13%	4,017	50.87%	4,336	2.00%	171	-319	8,524
Grainger	58.07%	3,198	40.15%	2,211	1.78%	98	987	5,507
Greene	63.81%	11,852	34.56%	6,419	1.64%	304	5,433	18,575
Grundy	37.68%	1,466	60.83%	2,367	1.49%	58	-901	3,891
Hamblen	60.58%	10,186	37.86%	6,366	1.55%	261	3,820	16,813
Hamilton	52.97%	57,411	46.04%	49,904	0.99%	1,075	7,507	108,390
Hancock	59.63%	1,130	38.47%	729	1.90%	36	401	1,895
Hardeman	42.45%	3,367	56.54%	4,484	1.01%	80	-1,117	7,931
Hardin	57.76%	4,278	40.90%	3,029	1.34%	99	1,249	7,406
Hawkins	58.29%	8,636	40.11%	5,943	1.59%	236	2,693	14,815
Haywood	35.90%	2,130	63.42%	3,763	0.67%	40	-1,633	5,933
Henderson	62.18%	5,360	36.26%	3,126	1.55%	134	2,234	8,620
Henry	47.77%	4,689	50.40%	4,947	1.83%	180	-258	9,816
Hickman	42.39%	2,852	55.63%	3,743	1.98%	133	-891	6,728
Houston	34.33%	931	63.94%	1,734	1.73%	47	-803	2,712
Humphreys	35.66%	2,236	62.43%	3,915	1.91%	120	-1,679	6,271
Jackson	34.13%	1,350	63.98%	2,531	1.90%	75	-1,181	3,956
Jefferson	61.61%	8,219	36.77%	4,906	1.62%	216	3,313	13,341
Johnson	64.83%	3,148	33.48%	1,626	1.69%	82	1,522	4,856
Knox	55.76%	69,129	42.99%	53,293	1.25%	1,545	15,836	123,967
Lake	36.42%	571	62.56%	981	1.02%	16	-410	1,568
Lauderdale	42.26%	2,953	56.59%	3,954	1.14%	80	-1,001	6,987
Lawrence	53.74%	6,715	44.41%	5,550	1.85%	231	1,165	12,496
Lewis	47.85%	1,893	49.77%	1,969	2.38%	94	-76	3,956
Lincoln	55.91%	4,535	42.78%	3,470	1.31%	106	1,065	8,111
Loudon	65.85%	10,812	32.70%	5,369	1.44%	237	5,443	16,418
Macon	54.83%	3,033	43.56%	2,410	1.61%	89	623	5,532
Madison	50.91%	15,367	48.20%	14,549	0.88%	267	818	30,183
Marion	44.47%	3,944	53.84%	4,775	1.69%	150	-831	8,869
Marshall	46.49%	3,391	51.58%	3,762	1.93%	141	-371	7,294
Maury	51.06%	11,994	47.37%	11,128	1.57%	368	866	23,490
McMinn	61.92%	8,762	36.85%	5,214	1.24%	175	3,548	14,151
McNairy	55.01%	4,292	43.06%	3,360	1.94%	151	932	7,803
Meigs	54.59%	1,808	44.23%	1,465	1.18%	39	343	3,312
Monroe	60.01%	7,535	38.67%	4,856	1.32%	166	2,679	12,557
Montgomery	47.71%	17,045	50.38%	17,999	1.91%	683	-954	35,727
Moore	53.84%	1,165	44.64%	966	1.52%	33	199	2,164
Morgan	51.45%	2,627	47.26%	2,413	1.29%	66	214	5,106
Obion	50.40%	4,936	48.34%	4,734	1.26%	123	202	9,793
Overton	39.41%	2,602	58.99%	3,895	1.61%	106	-1,293	6,603
Perry	41.23%	964	56.72%	1,326	2.05%	48	-362	2,338
Pickett	52.52%	1,124	45.65%	977	1.82%	39	147	2,140
Polk	51.66%	2,655	46.94%	2,412	1.40%	72	243	5,139
Putnam	50.11%	10,127	47.85%	9,670	2.04%	413	457	20,210
Rhea	60.31%	5,146	38.42%	3,278	1.27%	108	1,868	8,532
Roane	54.86%	9,645	43.62%	7,669	1.52%	268	1,976	17,582
Robertson	52.93%	10,008	45.41%	8,587	1.66%	313	1,421	18,908
Rutherford	54.88%	33,809	43.55%	26,829	1.58%	973	6,980	61,611
Scott	52.14%	2,798	46.66%	2,504	1.19%	64	294	5,366
Sequatchie	52.15%	2,227	46.51%	1,986	1.34%	57	241	4,270
Sevier	66.66%	15,361	31.79%	7,326	1.54%	355	8,035	23,042
Shelby	36.33%	103,377	63.15%	179,677	0.51%	1,465	-76,300	284,519
Smith	41.26%	2,610	57.26%	3,622	1.49%	94	-1,012	6,326
Stewart	38.34%	1,675	59.69%	2,608	1.97%	86	-933	4,369
Sullivan	61.49%	27,872	37.10%	16,814	1.40%	632	11,058	45,318
Sumner	57.93%	26,996	40.72%	18,976	1.36%	632	8,020	46,604
Tipton	58.22%	9,717	40.60%	6,775	1.18%	197	2,942	16,689
Trousdale	34.20%	891	64.26%	1,674	1.54%	40	-783	2,605
Unicoi	62.36%	3,491	35.99%	2,015	1.64%	92	1,476	5,598
Union	53.67%	2,418	44.95%	2,025	1.38%	62	393	4,505
Van Buren	39.92%	766	58.16%	1,116	1.93%	37	-350	1,919
Warren	43.18%	4,940	54.67%	6,255	2.15%	246	-1,315	11,441
Washington	61.26%	21,147	37.35%	12,894	1.39%	479	8,253	34,520
Wayne	60.23%	2,496	38.20%	1,583	1.57%	65	913	4,144
Weakley	53.51%	5,412	44.91%	4,542	1.58%	160	870	10,114
White	46.89%	3,601	50.70%	3,894	2.41%	185	-293	7,680
Williamson	66.86%	40,852	32.21%	19,682	0.93%	570	21,170	61,104
Wilson	57.83%	20,662	40.64%	14,520	1.53%	545	6,142	35,727
Total	50.71%	929,911	47.99%	879,976	1.30%	23,808	49,935	1,833,695

==== Counties that flipped from Republican to Democratic ====
- Cannon (largest city: Woodbury)
- Crockett (largest city: Bells)
- DeKalb (largest city: Smithville)
- Dickson (largest city: Dickson)
- Franklin (largest city: Winchester)
- Giles (largest city: Pulaski)
- Henry (largest city: Paris)
- Hickman (largest city: Centerville)
- Lewis (largest city: Hohenwald)
- Marion (largest city: Jasper)
- Marshall (largest city: Lewisburg)
- Warren (largest city: McMinnville)
- White (largest city: Sparta)
- Benton (largest municipality: Camden)
- Clay (largest municipality: Celina)
- Lake (largest municipality: Tiptonville)
- Lauderdale (largest municipality: Ripley)
- Overton (largest municipality: Livingston)
- Perry (largest municipality: Linden)
- Stewart (largest municipality: Dover)
- Trousdale (largest municipality: Hartsville)
- Van Buren (largest municipality: Spencer)
- Hardeman (largest city: Bolivar)
- Macon (largest city: Lafayette)
- Montgomery (largest city: Clarksville)
- Sequatchie (largest city: Dunlap)
- Haywood (largest city: Brownsville)
- Shelby (largest city: Memphis)
- Davidson (largest city: Nashville)

== See also ==
- 2006 United States Senate elections
- 2006 Tennessee gubernatorial election
- 2006 Tennessee elections
