= Harold Ford Sr. =

American politician (born 1945)

Harold Ford
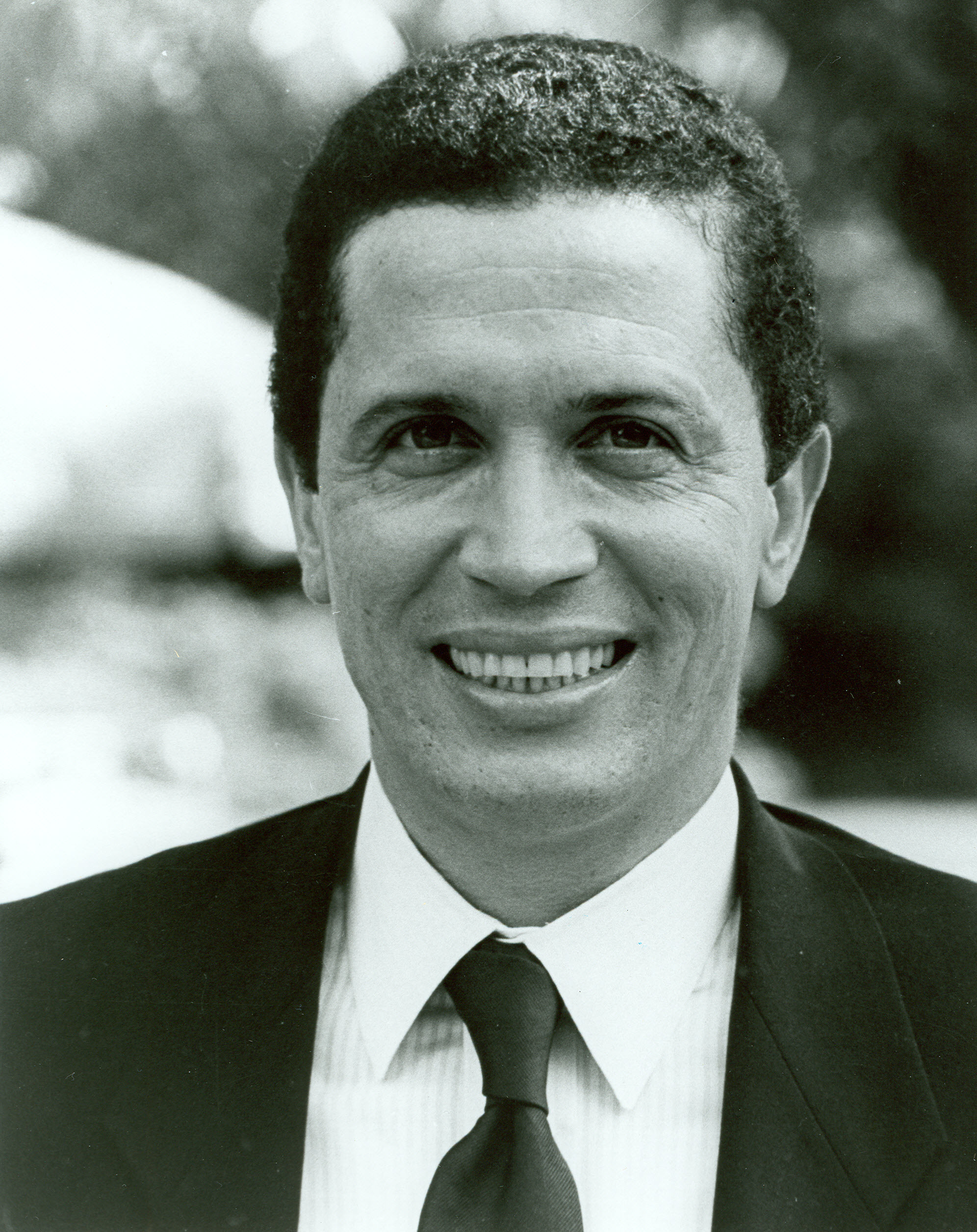

Member of the U.S. House of Representatives from Tennessee
- In office January 3, 1975 – January 3, 1997
- Preceded by: Dan Kuykendall
- Succeeded by: Harold Ford Jr.
- Constituency: 8th district (1975–1983); 9th district (1983–1997)

Member of the Tennessee House of Representatives from the 5th district
- In office 1971–1975
- Preceded by: James Taylor
- Succeeded by: Emmitt Ford (86th district)

Personal details
- Born: Harold Eugene Ford; May 20, 1945 (age 81) Memphis, Tennessee, U.S.
- Party: Democratic
- Spouses: Dorothy Bowles (m. 1969; div. 1999); Michelle Roberts (m. 1999)
- Children: 5, including Harold Jr.
- Relatives: Ford family
- Education: John A. Gupton College (AA); Tennessee State University (BS); Howard University (MBA)

Harold Eugene Ford Sr. (born May 20, 1945) is an American politician and Democratic former member of the United States House of Representatives representing the area of Memphis, Tennessee, for 11 terms—from 1975 until his retirement in 1997. He was the first African-American to represent Tennessee in the U.S. Congress. He is a member of the Ford political family from Memphis.

He advocated for increased government assistance for lower income constituents including job training, health care, and supplemental unemployment benefits with welfare as a safety net.

His effectiveness was diminished following his 1987 indictment on bank fraud charges that alleged he had used business loans for his personal needs. Ford denied the charges and claimed the prosecution was racially and politically motivated. He lost his committee leadership roles but remained in Congress while the legal proceeding was pending. He was ultimately tried and acquitted in 1993 of all charges by a jury.

He chose to retire from Congress in 1996. His son Harold Jr. returned to Tennessee from New York and successfully ran for his seat. In his retirement, Harold Sr. has been active in Democratic Party affairs and has worked as a lobbyist.

== Early life, education and family ==
Harold grew up on Horn Lake Road in the West Junction neighborhood of South Memphis. He is the eighth of 15 children born to Newton Jackson Ford (1914–1986) and Vera (Davis) Ford (1915–1994), prominent members of the African-American community. His mother was a homemaker and his father was an undertaker and businessman, who opened N.J. Ford Funeral Home (later changed to N.J. Ford And Sons Funeral Home) in 1932. His grandfather Lewie Ford (1889-1931) started the family funeral business and became allied with E. H. Crump, an influential white politician in Memphis and the state in the early 20th century.

Ford and his family have been involved in politics since his great-grandfather Newton Ford (1856–1919), who was a well-respected civic leader around the southern section of Shelby County. Newton Ford was elected as a county squire from 1888 to 1900. N. J. Ford ran for the Tennessee House in 1966 but was not elected.

Harold Ford graduated from Geeter High School in 1963, received his B.S. degree from Tennessee State University in Nashville in 1967 and did graduate work there for one year. He is also a member of Alpha Phi Alpha fraternity. He received a mortuary science degree from John A. Gupton College of Nashville in 1969, and worked in the family business as a mortician from 1969 until 1974. In 1982, he earned a Master of Business Administration from Howard University.

== Political career ==
=== State legislature ===
Ford was able to use his family's deep roots in Memphis to garner support within the affluent black community for his first run for office. He also ran an organized campaign and was able to take advantage of the increase in black voters that followed the Voting Rights Act. He was elected to the Tennessee House of Representatives in 1970, becoming one of its youngest members and one of only a few African Americans to have served in the Tennessee General Assembly to that point in the 20th century. He was made majority whip in his first term, and chaired a state house committee on utility rates and practices.

He was a delegate to Democratic State Convention and to the quadrennial Democratic National Conventions from 1972 through 1996.

=== U.S. House of Representatives ===
In 1974, after two terms in the Tennessee legislature, he ran for the Democratic nomination for the Memphis-based 8th U.S. Congressional district, easily beating three opponents. He faced four-term Republican incumbent Dan Kuykendall in the general election. At that time, the district still had a white majority, though the 1970 round of redistricting by the Tennessee legislature had redrawn the 8th to include more African-American voters. Ford ran on a bipartisan platform emphasizing economic development to attract both black and white voters. He waged a large and well organized get-out-the-vote campaign using paid workers, volunteers and his own considerable energy, and received support from black churches and celebrities. He was also able to take advantage of post Watergate dissatisfaction with the Republican Party. When the votes were first counted it looked like Kuykendall had eked out a narrow victory—but Ford ultimately won by 744 votes after contesting the original count.

Ford became the first African-American to represent Tennessee in the United States Congress. He was re-elected by large margins, locking in the black vote, and winning a large number of white votes in his district. After the 1983 census, the district was renumbered as the 9th District, and was drawn as a black-majority district. With the percentage of black voters increasing due to increased white flight, Ford then won re-election by gaining more than 70 percent of the vote. After he was indicted, he still garnered more than 50 percent of the vote.

He served on a number of House committees including: Banking, Currency and Housing; Veterans' Affairs, and the Select Committee on Assassinations that investigated the death, among others, of Martin Luther King Jr. He was a member of the influential House Ways and Means Committee beginning in 1975, and chaired the subcommittee on Public Assistance and Unemployment. He served as the chairman of the House Select Committee on Aging during the 102nd and 103rd Congresses.

Ford obtained ample federal funds for his district through his membership on the House Ways and Means Committee. He focused his work in Congress on helping lower income constituents. He advocated for increased federal government assistance for job training, health care, and unemployment supplemental benefits with welfare as a safety net. He supported Democratic President Carter's initiatives to rebuild central cities, and opposed cuts to programs such as Medicare and food stamps that were passed during the administration of Republican President Ronald Reagan. Ford proposed comprehensive welfare reform legislation to gradually transition recipients with children over the age of six from welfare to work. The legislation had a high start up cost due to the education and job training aspects, and was opposed by the Reagan administration.

Ford suffered in the eyes of many for the antics of his brother John Ford, who had been elected to the Tennessee State Senate in the same 1974 election. John Ford was accused, but never criminally convicted, of driving between Memphis and Nashville at high speeds while in possession of a legal firearm. Harold Ford said he had no control over his brother's actions.

=== Bribery trials ===
In 1987, federal prosecutors obtained an indictment against Ford from a grand jury in eastern Tennessee. The indictment was based on testimony from two bankers, both partners of Jake Butcher, who pled guilty to bank fraud under a plea bargain. Ford was charged in 18 counts of conspiracy and fraud accusing him of receiving nearly $1.5 million in loans from 1976 to 1983, that prosecutors alleged were actually bribes. Ford contended that the loans were legitimate business transactions used to extend loans to him and his family funeral home business.

A first trial in Memphis in 1990 ended in a mistrial with the jury deadlocked 8-4 along straight racial lines. The eight black jury members voted to acquit, and the four whites voted to convict. The judge granted the prosecutor's motion for retrial, and held that an impartial jury could not be found in Ford's hometown, the heavily Democratic and predominantly black city of Memphis where Ford was very popular. He ordered that the jury for the retrial be selected for a pool of jurors living 80 miles from Memphis in 17 heavily Republican and predominantly white rural counties. The jurors were to be bused into Memphis for the trial. Ford appealed this jury selection plan twice to the Sixth U.S. Circuit Court of Appeals on the ground that it violated his constitutional right to a jury of his peers; the appeals were denied twice. In 1993, Stuart Gerson, a hold-over Bush-appointee serving as acting Attorney General sided with Ford's request for a jury from Memphis, but the federal judge hearing the trial rejected the request. On April 9, 1993, a jury of 11 whites and 1 black acquitted Ford of all charges. During the seven year pendentcy of the criminal charges, Ford remained a U.S. Representative, but was stripped by Congress of his committee leadership roles. After his acquittal they were restored. In 1992, he had also been implicated in the House banking scandal.

== Later career ==
Harold Jr., Ford's son, in 1996 returned to run for his retiring father's seat after having worked in New York City and completed his education at the University of Pennsylvania and University of Michigan Law School. The elder Ford publicly hoped that the confrontational stance that he had sometimes used, particularly with regard to race, would never need to be employed by his son.

== Personal life ==
Ford married Dorothy Bowles in 1969 and the couple had three children: Harold Jr., Newton Jake and Sir Isaac. They divorced in 1999. He and his second wife, Michelle Roberts have two children: Andrew and Ava.

He is a member of Alpha Phi Alpha fraternity. He is a Baptist. Currently retired, Ford divides his time between Tennessee and Fisher Island in Miami-Dade County, Florida.

He is still active in the Democratic Party.

== See also ==
- List of African-American United States representatives

U.S. House of Representatives
Preceded by Dan Kuykendall	Member of the U.S. House of Representatives from Tennessee's 8th congressional district 1975–1983	Succeeded by Ed Jones
New constituency	Member of the U.S. House of Representatives from Tennessee's 9th congressional district 1983–1997	Succeeded by Harold Ford Jr.
U.S. order of precedence (ceremonial)
Preceded by James Langevin as Former U.S. Representative	Order of precedence of the United States as Former U.S. Representative	Succeeded by John S. Tanner as Former U.S. Representative
