= Tennessee's 29th Senate district =

American legislative district

Tennessee's 29th State Senate district
Senator
Raumesh Akbari; D–Memphis
- Demographics: 21% White; 73% Black; 4% Hispanic; 1% Asian; 2% Multiracial
- Population (2022): 206,815

Tennessee's 29th Senate district is one of 33 districts in the Tennessee Senate. It has been represented by Democrat Raumesh Akbari since 2018, succeeding fellow Democrat Lee Harris.

== Geography ==
District 29 is based in Memphis, following the Mississippi River to cover parts of South and Downtown Memphis – including much of historic Beale Street – as well as Millington and other unincorporated Shelby County suburbs to the north.

The district is located almost entirely within Tennessee's 9th congressional district, with a very small section extending into the 8th district. It overlaps with the 84th, 85th, 86th, 87th, 90th, 91st, 93rd, and 99th districts of the Tennessee House of Representatives, and borders the states of Mississippi and Arkansas.

== Recent election results ==
Tennessee Senators are elected to staggered four-year terms, with odd-numbered districts holding elections in midterm years and even-numbered districts holding elections in presidential years.

=== 2018 ===
2018 Tennessee Senate election, District 29
Primary election
Party	Candidate	Votes	%
Democratic	Raumesh Akbari	14,861	58.4
Democratic	Justin Ford	10,577	41.6
Total votes		25,438	100
General election
Democratic	Raumesh Akbari	43,851	83.5
Republican	Tom Stephens	8,679	16.5
Total votes		52,530	100
Democratic hold			

=== 2014 ===
2014 Tennessee Senate election, District 29
Primary election
Party	Candidate	Votes	%
Democratic	Lee Harris	10,517	42.5
Democratic	Ricky Dixon	6,882	27.8
Democratic	Ophelia Ford (incumbent)	6,756	27.3
Democratic	Herman Sawyer	611	2.5
Total votes		24,766	100
Republican	Jim Finney	3,111	82.0
Republican	Anthony Herron, Jr.	682	18.0
Total votes		3,793	100
General election
Democratic	Lee Harris	27,707	81.9
Republican	Jim Finney	6,123	18.1
Total votes		33,830	100
Democratic hold			

=== Federal and statewide results ===
Year	Office	Results
2020	President	Biden 82.2 – 16.1%
2016	President	Clinton 83.3 – 14.3%
2012	President	Obama 85.5 – 13.7%
2012	Senate	Clayton 72.7 – 22.1%
