= Riverside, Memphis =

Neighborhood in Memphis, Tennessee

Coordinates: 35.0992°N 90.0698°W

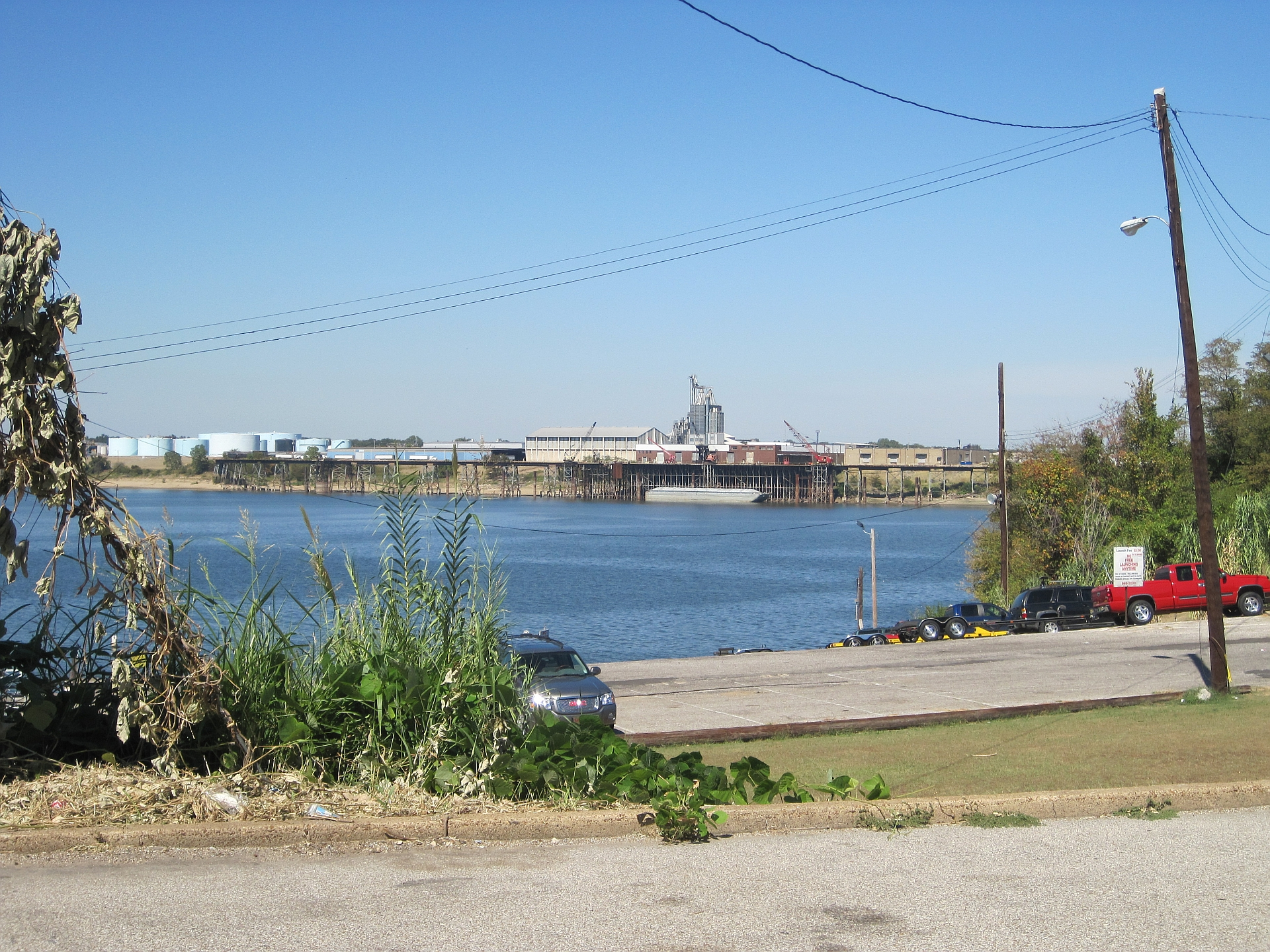
Dr. Martin Luther King Jr. Riverside Park at Mallory Avenue and Exit 9 of I-55 in Memphis

Riverside is a neighborhood in South Memphis. The neighborhood includes Kansas Street, Carver High (which is on Pennsylvania Street) and Martin Luther King Riverside Park.

The main boundary of Riverside is South Parkway, which is on the north.

== Notable people ==
- Harold Ford Jr., U.S. Representative from 1997 to 2007
- Eric Jerome Dickey, author
- Craig Petties, convicted drug trafficker
