= Governor Ford =

Governor Ford may refer to:

- Aaron Ford (born 1972), 32nd Governor-elect of Nevada
- David Ford (civil servant) (1935–2017), Acting Governor of Hong Kong in 1992
- Sam C. Ford (1882–1961), 12th Governor of Montana
- Seabury Ford (1801–1855), 20th Governor of Ohio
- Thomas Ford (politician) (1800–1850), 8th Governor of Illinois
- Wendell Ford (1924–2015), 53rd Governor of Kentucky
