= T. O. Fuller State Park =

State park in Memphis, Tennessee

T.O. Fuller State Park
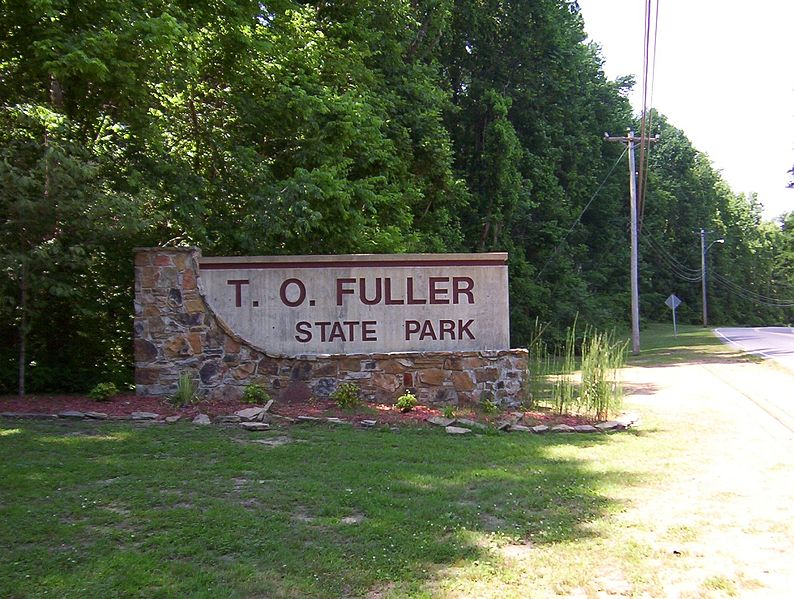
- T.O. Fuller State Park Memphis TN
- Interactive map of T.O. Fuller State Park
- Type: Tennessee State Park
- Location: Memphis, Shelby County, Tennessee
- Coordinates: 35°03′35″N 90°06′51″W
- Area: 1,138 acres (461 ha)
- Operator: TDEC
- Website: T.O. Fuller State Park

T.O. Fuller State Park is a state park in the city of Memphis, Tennessee, USA. It consists of 1,138 acres (461 ha) of mostly forest located in South Memphis on Mitchell Road. It is the only state park within the city limits and is suitable for wildlife.

The park is named in honor of Thomas O. Fuller, who spent his life empowering and educating African Americans. The park facilities were originally built for the use of African Americans in the Great Depression by the Civilian Conservation Corps (CCC). It was the first state park in the United States east of the Mississippi River that was open to African Americans.

CCC camp number 1464-SP-10, which was composed of African Americans, initiated construction of the park facilities in 1938. During excavation for a proposed swimming pool in 1940, CCC workers unearthed evidence of a prehistoric village. The site has since been developed as Chucalissa Indian Village and includes a village, preserved archeological excavations and the C.H. Nash Museum at Chucalissa.

== Facilities ==
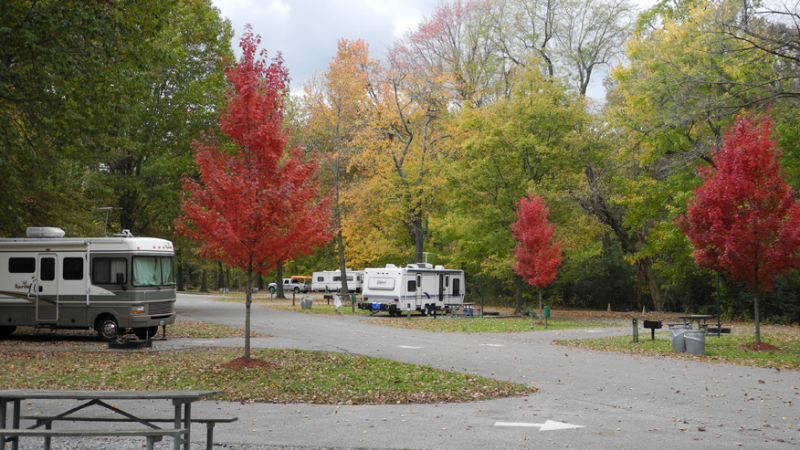
Campground

Amenities at T.O. Fuller State Park include sheltered picnic areas, tennis courts, swimming pool, basketball courts, softball field, six miles (10 km) of hiking trails and camping facilities. The park's nature center is open in the summer and features natural history exhibits and programs.

== C.H. Nash Museum at Chucalissa ==
During construction of T.O. Fuller State Park in 1938, the CCC discovered Native American artifacts on the site, now known as Chucalissa. The University of Tennessee initiated archaeological excavations of this Mississippian mound complex in 1940, but this work was interrupted by World War II. Excavations and other work at Chucalissa began once again in 1955. The facility is currently operated by the University of Memphis and serves as a gateway for understanding archaeology and the interpretation of Native American history.

It was declared a National Historic Landmark in 1994.
