= Judge Ford =

Judge Ford may refer to:

- Francis Ford (judge) (1882–1975), judge of the United States District Court for the District of Massachusetts
- Hiram Church Ford (1884–1969), judge of the United States District Court for the Eastern District of Kentucky
- Morgan Ford (1911–1992), judge of the United States Court of International Trade
- J.J. (Josie-Jo) Ford, fictional judge in the novel, The Westing Game
