= Justice Ford =

Justice Ford may refer to:

- Thomas Ford (politician) (1800–1850), associate justice of the Supreme Court of Illinois
- G. Sarsfield Ford (1933–2013), associate justice of the Connecticut Supreme Court
- Sam C. Ford (1882–1961), associate justice of the Montana Supreme Court
