= John A. Gupton College =

College specializing in mortuary science in Nashville, Tennessee

- Type: Private school of mortuary science
- Established: September 25, 1946
- Academic affiliations: Local hospitals
- Endowment: John A. Gupton Alumni Association
- Location: Nashville, Tennessee, United States; 36.156568°N 86.794836°W
- Website: guptoncollege.edu

John A. Gupton College is a private 2-year college in Nashville, Tennessee that specializes in mortuary science. Founded in 1946, it awards the Associate of Arts degree in Funeral Service. Gupton College is accredited by both the Commission on Colleges of the Southern Association of Colleges and Schools and the American Board of Funeral Service Education. Gupton is located just west of downtown Nashville, in the same building as the Tennessee Funeral Directors Associational Office.

== History ==
=== Founding ===
In March 1946, John A. Gupton Jr. and his wife Bernadean purchased the former Gov. Hill McAlister Mansion located at 2507 West End Avenue, in Nashville, Tennessee. They founded and opened the John A. Gupton College of Mortuary Science on September 25, 1946. John was President and Bernadean was Educational Director.

The first class began on September 27, 1946, with an enrollment of 26 students. The course work was nine months in length.

=== Additions and renovations ===
In 1952, additions were needed. A large two-story classroom building, Paul L. Williams Hall (in honor of the college's 1st Law instructor), was erected. The new building was 3,700 square feet (340 m^{2}) with the floor plan as follows: the first floor included two offices, storage rooms, utility rooms, lockers, lecture room and preparation rooms; the second floor included a large lecture room and a science laboratory.

The growth of the college began to increase after 1954, with Gupton-Jones merging with the Dallas Institute of Mortuary Science. John A. Gupton College became the only mortuary college in the southeast. In the next few years more additions were made. Alumni Hall was erected adjacent to Williams Hall and housed the administrative offices and a large conference room. Kensington Place Hall, a large two story building, was erected behind Williams Hall and housed Memorial Library, faculty offices and two lecture rooms. Puryear Mims Hall was located two blocks from the main campus at 2810 Vanderbilt Place and was used for a Fine Arts instruction.

In October 1964, the college was incorporated under the laws of the state of Tennessee as a school of mortuary science. The school was incorporated as a non-profit educational institution in 1965, and has since been known as John A. Gupton College.

In keeping with standards set by the American Board of Funeral Service Education in the fall of 1966, a program of study leading to an Associate's degree in Mortuary Science was offered. The college received correspondence from the Southern Association of Colleges and Schools on January 14, 1970 and official accreditation at the Association's annual meeting in December 1971. This accreditation made John A. Gupton College the first college accredited by both the American Board of Funeral Service Education and a regional accrediting agency with scholastic transferability.

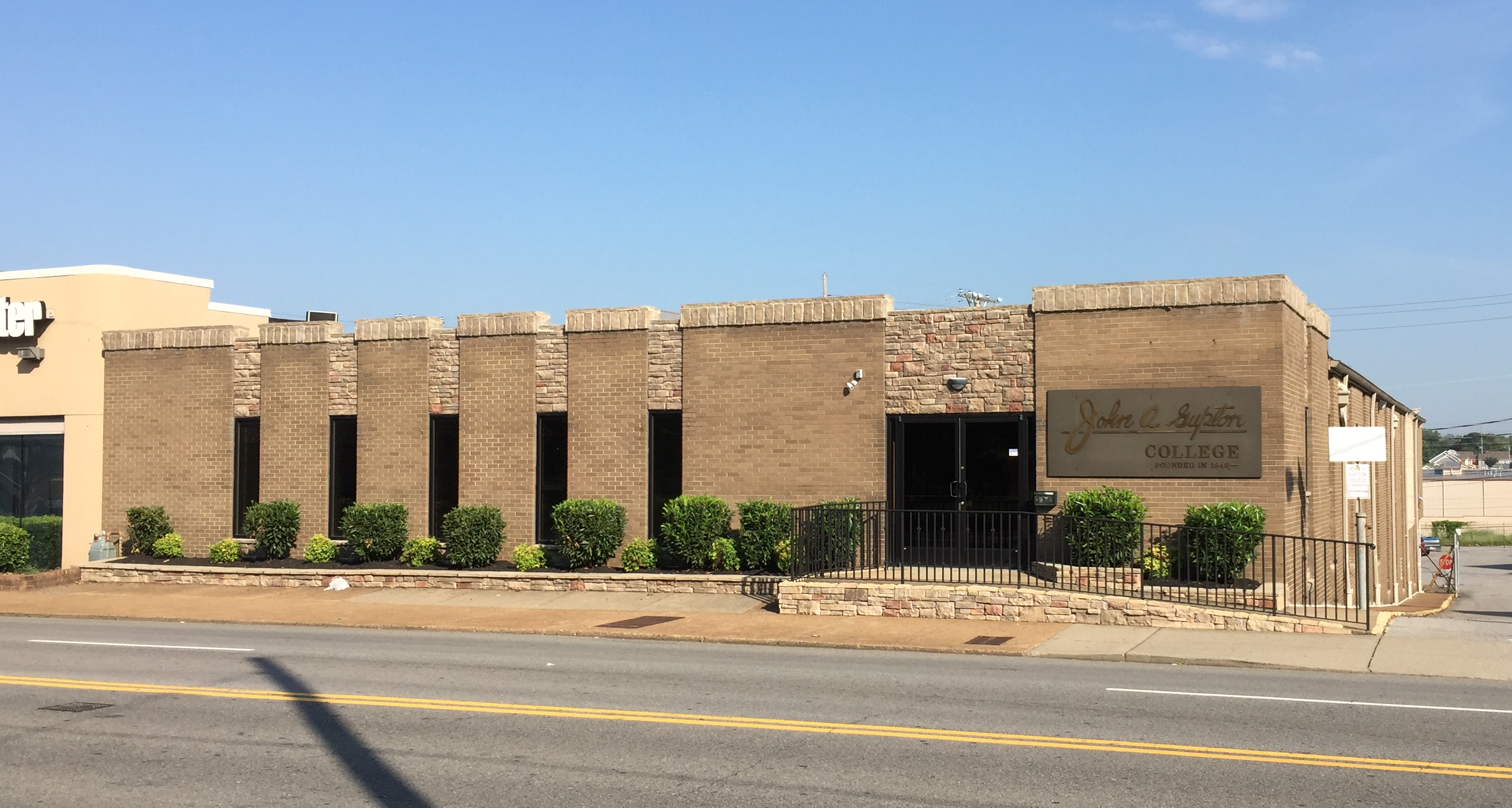
John A. Gupton College building at 1616 Church St. in Nashville, Tennessee

Gupton died on December 15, 1988. John A. Gupton, III assumed the position of president of the college. Mrs. Gupton remained on the faculty for several years until her death on August 15, 1994.

The board of directors and the Gupton heirs decided to sell the campus to Vanderbilt University in the fall of 1991. The college relocated to a 20,000 sq ft (1,900 m^{2}) new facility in mid-town Nashville at 1616 Church Street in the fall of 1992.

The school purchased a 14 unit apartment building adjacent to the new campus in April 1998, to be used as student housing.
