= Harold Ford Jr. =

American politician (born 1970)

Harold Ford
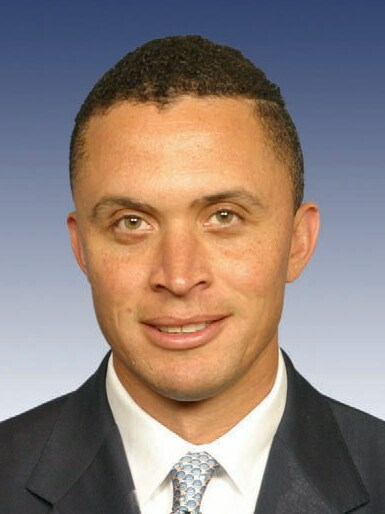

Member of the U.S. House of Representatives from Tennessee's 9th district
- In office January 3, 1997 – January 3, 2007
- Preceded by: Harold Ford Sr.
- Succeeded by: Steve Cohen

Personal details
- Born: Harold Eugene Ford Jr. May 11, 1970 (age 56) Memphis, Tennessee, U.S.
- Party: Democratic
- Spouse: Emily Threlkeld (m. 2008)
- Children: 2
- Parent: Harold Ford Sr. (father)
- Relatives: Ford family
- Education: University of Pennsylvania (BA); University of Michigan (JD)
- Website: Official website
- Ford's speaking voice Ford on his early career in politics and what he learned.

Harold Eugene Ford Jr. (born May 11, 1970) is an American financial managing director, pundit, author, and former U.S. Congressman who served from 1997 to 2007 in the United States House of Representatives as a member of the Democratic Party from Tennessee's 9th congressional district, centered in Memphis. He is a member of the Ford political family from Memphis, and is the son of former Congressman Harold Ford Sr., who held the same seat for 22 years. In 2006, Ford made an unsuccessful bid for the U.S. Senate seat vacated by the retiring Bill Frist. He was also the last chairman of the Democratic Leadership Council (DLC).

Between 2011 and 2017, Ford worked for Morgan Stanley as a managing director. He also regularly appeared on television on politically related programs on NBC's Meet the Press, MSNBC, CNN, CNBC.

On December 1, 2020, Ford was named Vice Chairman of Corporate & Institutional Banking at PNC Financial Services. He and his wife live in New York City and have a daughter, Georgia Walker, and a son, Harold Eugene III.

Ford also wrote a book, More Davids Than Goliaths: A Political Education, published in 2010.

In April 2021, Ford joined Fox News as a political contributor. He frequently appears on Special Report as a panel member and was named a co-host of The Five in January 2022.

== Family and education ==
Ford was born in Memphis, Tennessee, the eldest son of former Representative Harold Ford Sr. and Dorothy Bowles Ford. He has two brothers, Jake and Isaac, as well as two half-siblings, Andrew and Ava, from his father's second marriage.

The Ford family has long been prominent in Memphis's Black community. Ford's grandfather, N. J. Ford, established a funeral home, which gave the family a broad network in the community. E.H. Crump, a prominent white Democrat, dominated city and state politics in the early 20th century and befriended N.J. Ford. Ford's uncle is John N. Ford, who is Harold Sr.'s brother and was a member of the Tennessee State Senate until he was convicted on federal bribery charges in 2007 as part of the Operation Tennessee Waltz scandal.

Ford lived the first years of his life within the living quarters of his family-owned business N.J. Ford And Sons Funeral Home, which at the time was located in the Riverside neighborhood. He was baptized at his family church, Mt. Moriah-East Baptist Church. He attended Double Tree Elementary School, a public Montessori school in the Westwood neighborhood, although graduated from the private St. Albans School, a prestigious university-preparatory school in Washington, D.C., which he attended after his father became a Congressman. He went on to earn a B.A. in American history from the University of Pennsylvania in 1992.

== Early career and legal education ==
After graduation, Ford went into government, serving as a staff aide to the Senate Budget Committee. In 1993, he became special assistant at the United States Department of Commerce.

Ford returned to university for a J.D. degree from the University of Michigan Law School in 1996. During his campaign for the House of Representatives, he sat for and failed the Tennessee bar exam; he said that he intended to try again; as of 2014, he had not.

== House of Representatives career ==
When Harold Sr. decided not to seek a twelfth term in Congress in 1996, Harold Jr. entered the race and became the favorite in the Democratic primary, which was widely regarded as the real contest in the heavily Democratic, Black-majority 9th district. Ford arranged his schedule for his last semester of law school so he would not have Monday or Friday classes and would be able to fly home to Memphis for an extended weekend each week to continue his campaign. As was expected, he easily won the Democratic primary, followed by his election in November. Taking office at the age of 26, he was one of the youngest members of Congress in US history, the youngest in the 105th and 106th Congresses. He was also the first member of Congress born in the 1970s and, alongside Adam Smith of Washington, one of the first members of Generation X to serve in Congress. He was reelected four times without substantive Republican opposition by an average of eighty percent of the vote. In 2000, Ford was the keynote speaker for the 2000 Democratic National Convention, supporting then Vice President Al Gore for the Democratic nomination for President.

On 4 November 1999, Ford voted in favor of the Gramm–Leach–Bliley Act. This act repealed much of the Glass–Steagall Act of 1933, which had been enacted to prevent any one organization from acting as any combination of an investment bank, a commercial bank, and an insurance company. The resulting repeal allowed many banks and insurance companies to invest money in various securities that was raised from savings and checking bank accounts or insurance policies. Several economists, notably Nobel laureate Joseph Stiglitz, point to the repeal of Glass–Steagall as helping to create the conditions of the 2008 financial crisis.

On October 10, 2002, he was among the 81 House Democrats who voted in favor of authorizing the invasion of Iraq.

After the Democrats lost seven Congressional seats in the 2002 elections, Ford announced his candidacy for House Democratic Leader, challenging then-House Minority Whip Nancy Pelosi, arguing that current leadership was ineffective. Ford was defeated but exceeded initial expectations in the amount of support he received. Although his name was mentioned as a possible Democratic vice presidential candidate in 2004, he was ineligible for the office due to his age (four months shy of 35 on Inauguration Day 2005).

A June 7, 2005, article in The Washington Times reported that from 1998 to 2003, Ford took 61 privately funded trips but did not file travel disclosure forms with the House clerk for the trips, as required by the chamber's ethics rules until August 2003. Ford's office called the late filings a "mere oversight", since Ford had filed the required financial disclosure statements for the trips at the time they occurred.

In November 2005, when Ohio Republican Congresswoman Jean Schmidt implied that Pennsylvania Democrat John Murtha was a "coward" in response to Murtha's proposal for a withdrawal of American forces from Iraq, Ford charged across the House floor to the Republican side during the resulting uproar in the chamber, shouting "Say it to Murtha!" (or "Say Murtha's name!" depending on the source) while waving his finger at Schmidt. He had to be restrained by fellow Democrat Dave Obey of Wisconsin. Like many Democrats, Ford believed Schmidt's remarks (which she later withdrew) were an unwarranted "cheap shot" against Murtha, a veteran of the Marine Corps.

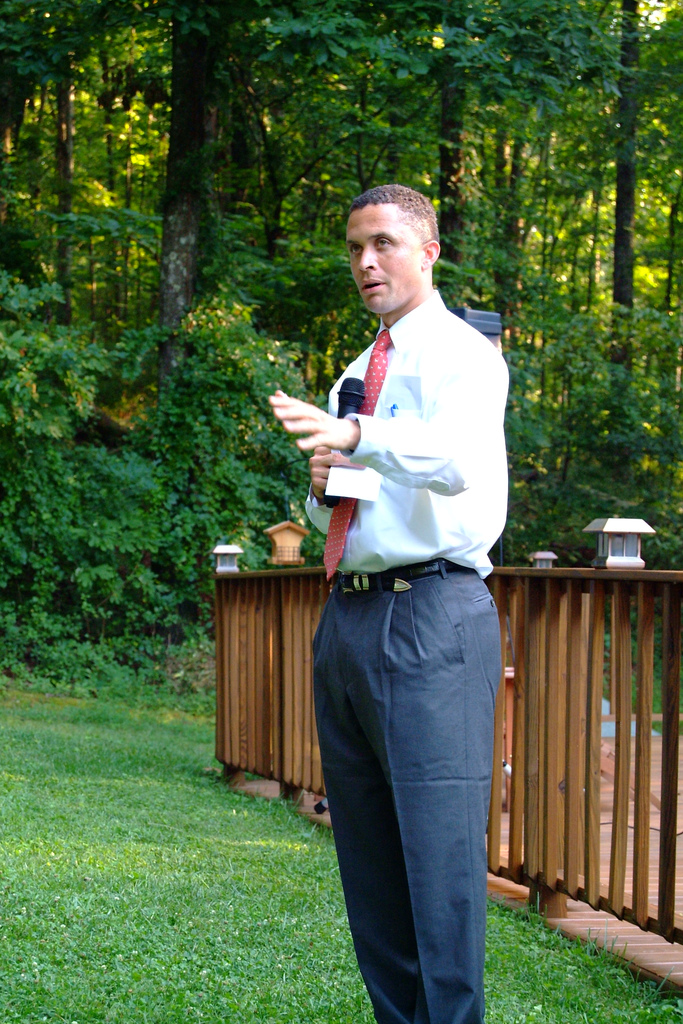
Harold Ford Jr. on the campaign trail

He supported the Republican effort to intercede in the Terri Schiavo case. He opposed President George W. Bush's energy proposals (including oil drilling in Arctic National Wildlife Refuge), demonstrated support for adoption rights of same-sex couples, is in favor of federal funding of embryonic stem cell research, supported universal healthcare coverage, opposed the death penalty, and indicated a willingness to reform drug policy.

In addition, Ford sat on the House Budget Committee and the House Financial Services Committee. He also served on the Transformation Advisory Group, a group of political, military and academic leaders who worked with the Department of Defense to assess the needs of the armed forces. Ford was a member of the New Democrat Coalition, the Congressional Black Caucus and the Blue Dog Coalition.

In 2002, Ford was mentioned as a possible Democratic candidate for the Senate seat being vacated by Fred Thompson, but he declined to run. Instead, he supported fellow Congressman Bob Clement who would lose to former Republican Governor Lamar Alexander in the general election.

In 2006, Ford did not run for re-election to the House of Representatives, due to his campaign for the United States Senate in Tennessee. Although he won the Democratic primary, he lost the general election by a margin of 2.7%. His younger brother, Jake Ford, ran for the 9th district seat as an Independent, but lost to Democrat Steve Cohen.

== 2006 United States Senate campaign ==
On April 6, 2005, during an interview on C-SPAN's call-in show Washington Journal, Ford confirmed that he would be running for the United States Senate. He filed the papers necessary to officially begin his Senate campaign on May 25, 2005.

Democratic State Senator Rosalind Kurita briefly challenged Ford for the nomination but dropped out of the primary because of inadequate fundraising, effectively handing Ford the nomination. On August 3, 2006, Ford overwhelmingly won the Democratic primary. After the primary, Ford's supporters held a large victory celebration at Nashville's LP Field, now Nissan Stadium. Among the speakers was former U.S. President Bill Clinton.

Ford faced Republican Bob Corker in the November 2006 election. Not long after Corker's primary victory was assured, Ford challenged Corker to seven televised debates across the state. In response, Corker said he would debate Ford, though he did not agree to seven debates.

In October 2006, the Republican Party ran radio and television ads characterized by some as racist. A radio spot, referred to by critics as the "jungle drums" ad, had drums playing when Ford's name was mentioned and patriotic music when Corker's name was spoken. This ad was criticized as attacking Ford's race by evoking images of primitive, chanting African tribes. A television ad that received more attention featured satirical "man‑on‑the‑street" interviews purporting to support Ford, including one in which a blond white woman talks about meeting Ford at "the Playboy party"; she returns at the end of the ad to wink and whisper in a seductive tone, "Harold, call me." The ad was denounced by many people, including Republican former Senator William Cohen, who called it "a very serious appeal to a racist sentiment", and Corker asked the Republican leadership to pull the ad. The ad was retired one day after Republican National Committee Chairman Ken Mehlman said he had no authority to discontinue the ad and disagreed with the negative characterizations of it.

Corker and Ford participated in a televised debate in Memphis on October 7, in Corker's hometown of Chattanooga on October 10, and in Nashville on October 28. In January 2006, NBC's Meet the Press extended an open invitation for the candidates to debate on the nationally televised show.

On November 8, Ford conceded the election to Corker, who defeated Ford by less than three percentage points.

== Post-congressional activities ==
In December 2006, the Los Angeles Times reported that Ford told students at an L.A.-area school that he might run again in 2008 for the Senate seat held by Republican Lamar Alexander, but in January 2007 Ford said that he had no plans to challenge the incumbent. Instead, Ford has said that he "hopes to spend a lot of time at home, perhaps do some teaching and work with Governor Bredesen on some issues in Tennessee."

On January 25, 2007, Ford was named chairman of the Democratic Leadership Council.

In March 2007, Ford joined the financial services firm Merrill Lynch as a vice chairman and senior policy adviser. In the same month he was hired by Fox News Channel as a political contributor. In March 2008, he moved from Fox to MSNBC as a news analyst, appearing as a panelist on David Gregory's Race for the White House, Hardball, and Morning Joe.

Ford was appointed visiting professor of public policy at Vanderbilt University in 2007 and taught a class on American political leadership. In October 2007, Ford was appointed as the inaugural Barbara Jordan Visiting Professor at the Lyndon B. Johnson School of Public Affairs at the University of Texas at Austin. As of the spring 2010 semester, he is a visiting professor at New York University's Wagner School of Public Service where he teaches Policy Formation: U.S. Domestic Policy. In the fall of 2015 he was a visiting faculty member at the University of Michigan Ford School of Public Policy.

Ford worked at the Wall Street firm Morgan Stanley as a managing director. In late 2017, erroneous media reports said that he was fired for sexual misconduct and Morgan Stanley issued a statement the following month saying that no sexual misconduct took place. In January 2018, The New York Times reported that Ford reached a legal settlement with Morgan Stanley.

Ford is on the Board of Selectors of Jefferson Awards for Public Service. He is also a member of the ReFormers Caucus of Issue One.

== 2010 United States Senate election ==
Ford considered a primary challenge to Senator Kirsten Gillibrand in New York in 2010. Sources close to then-Mayor of New York Michael Bloomberg said that he would consider supporting someone "of Mr. Ford's stature", although it was also reported that Bloomberg "reassured [ Harry Reid, the then-Senate Majority Leader ] that he was not personally involved in the effort to promote a Ford candidacy." Chuck Schumer sought to dissuade Ford from running.

On February 5, 2010, Gillibrand held a press conference at which she raised questions as to whether Ford, as an executive of Merrill Lynch, received taxpayer-backed bonuses from Bank of America, stemming from the federal bailout. She was joined by New York City Public Advocate Bill de Blasio, who endorsed her candidacy.

On February 12, it was reported that Ford's NBC contract was suspended due to his potential campaign, and that he had taken an unpaid leave of absence from Merrill Lynch for the same reason. On March 1, Ford stated in an op-ed article published by The New York Times that he would not run against Gillibrand.

== Personal life ==
Ford married Emily Threlkeld, who works in public relations for Carolina Herrera in New York, on April 26, 2008. They have a daughter, Georgia Walker Ford. Their second child, a son, Harold Eugene Ford III, was born in May 2015.

== Electoral history ==
Tennessee's 9th congressional district: Results 1996–2004
Year	Democrat	Votes	Pct	Republican	Votes	Pct		3rd Party	Party	Votes	Pct	
1996	Harold E. Ford Jr.	116,345	61%	Rod DeBerry	70,951	37%		Silky Sullivan	Independent	957	1%	*
1998	Harold E. Ford Jr.	75,428	79%	Claude Burdikoff	18,078	19%		Gwendolyn L. Moore	Independent	932	1%	*
2000	Harold E. Ford Jr.	143,298	100%	(no candidate)			*					
2002	Harold E. Ford Jr.	120,904	84%	(no candidate)				Tony Rush	Independent	23,208	16%	*
2004	Harold E. Ford Jr.	190,648	82%	Ruben M. Fort	41,578	18%	*					

*Write-in and minor candidate notes: In 1996, Mary D. Taylor received 498 votes; Anthony Burton received 424 votes; Greg Voehringer received 327 votes; Tom Jeanette received 222 votes; Del Gill received 199 votes; Bill Taylor received 179 votes; Johnny E. Kelly received 156 votes; Don Fox received 146 votes; and write-ins received 10 votes. In 1998, Johnny Kelly received 775 votes; Greg Voehringer received 567 votes; and write-ins received 2 votes. In 2000, write-ins received 36 votes. In 2002, write-ins received 148 votes. In 2004, Jim Maynard received 166 votes.

2006 Democratic Primary for U.S. Senate (TN)

- Harold Ford Jr., 79%
- Gary G. Davis, 10%
- John Jay Hooker, 6%

U. S. Senate (Class I) elections in Tennessee: Results 2006
Year	Democrat	Votes	Pct	Republican	Votes	Pct	3rd Party	Party	Votes	Pct	
2006	Harold Ford Jr.	879,976	48%	Bob Corker	929,911	51%	Ed Choate	Independent	10,831	1%	*

*Write-in and minor candidate notes: In 2006, David "None of the Above" Gatchell received 3,746 votes, Emory "Bo" Heyward received 3,580 votes, H. Gary Keplinger received 3,033 votes and Chris Lugo (Green) received 2,589 votes.

== See also ==
- "30 Something" Working Group
- List of African-American United States representatives
- List of African-American United States Senate Candidates

U.S. House of Representatives
Preceded by Harold Ford Sr.	Member of the U.S. House of Representatives from Tennessee's 9th congressional district 1997–2007	Succeeded by Steve Cohen
Honorary titles
Preceded by Patrick Kennedy	Baby of the House; 1997–2001	Succeeded by Adam Putnam
Party political offices
Preceded by Evan Bayh	Keynote Speaker of the Democratic National Convention; 2000	Succeeded by Barack Obama
Preceded by Jeff Clark	Democratic nominee for U.S. Senator from Tennessee (Class 1); 2006	Succeeded by Mark E. Clayton
Preceded by Tom Vilsack	Chair of the Democratic Leadership Council; 2007–2011	Position abolished
U.S. order of precedence (ceremonial)
Preceded by Anne Northup as Former U.S. Representative	Order of precedence of the United States as Former U.S. Representative	Succeeded by Bill Jenkins as Former U.S. Representative
