= South Memphis, Memphis, Tennessee =

Neighborhood in Memphis, Tennessee, United States of America

Coordinates: 35.073°N 89.971°W

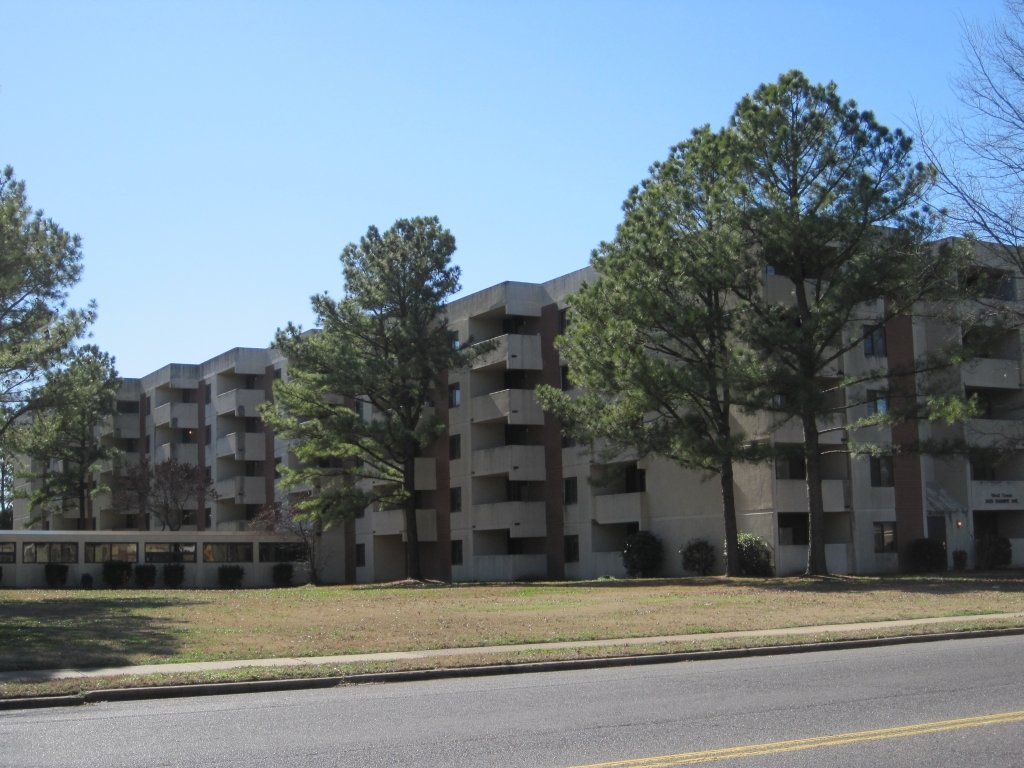
- A housing project in South Memphis
- Interactive map of South Memphis, Memphis, Tennessee
- ZIP Code: 38106, 38109, 38126 and 38116

South Memphis, one of the oldest portions of Memphis, Tennessee, is a community stretching from Riverside Drive and E. H. Crump Blvd just south of Downtown south and east to Pendleton St. & Ketchum Rd., south of Orange Mound. In its early days, it was primarily an agrarian community. It was an independent city from 1846 to 1849, when it was annexed to Memphis.

Neighborhoods include Lauderdale Sub, Longview, Riverside, Lakeview Gardens, Prospect Park, Dukestown, Gaslight Square, Wilbert Heights, Mallory Heights, Dixie Heights, Barton Heights, Elliston Heights, Handy Holiday, Chickasaw Village, Pine Hill, Indian Hills, Bunker Hill, Boxtown, West Junction, Walker Homes, Nehemiah, and French Fort. Many locations in South Memphis are considered a hotbed for crime and violence due to the high amount of gang influence and the overall poverty level of the area. South Memphis is notable for its plentiful houses of worship.

== History ==
South Memphis was incorporated January 6, 1846, and an election for mayor and eight aldermen was held on the third Saturday of the same month, resulting in the election of Sylvester Bailey, mayor, and A. B. Shaw, H. H. Menus, George W. Davis, W. Howard, J. E. Merriman, John Brown, J. P. Keiser and James Kennedy, aldermen. The boundaries of South Memphis were defined as follows: On the east, south and west the boundaries are the same as the South Memphis tract, and on the north the boundary line commences in the center of the Mississippi River, opposite the rise of Union Street; thence east with the center of Union Street, as at present laid off until the same intersects with the Pigeon Roost road; thence with the south side of Pigeon Roost road to the east line of the South Memphis tract of land. On September 4, South Memphis was divided into four wards. The treasurer for the first corporate year made a report showing that the revenue amounted to $6,266.17, and licenses, etc., to $3,750.50. John T. Trezevant was mayor in 1847-48 and A. B. Taylor in 1849.

Unification of South Memphis and Memphis was a contentious subject in the 1840s, but by 1849, it became clear that the success of the Memphis and Charleston Railroad depended on union, and on November 15, 1849, Memphis annexed South Memphis. The last meeting of the mayor and aldermen of South Memphis took place on December 31, 1849.

== Notable sites ==
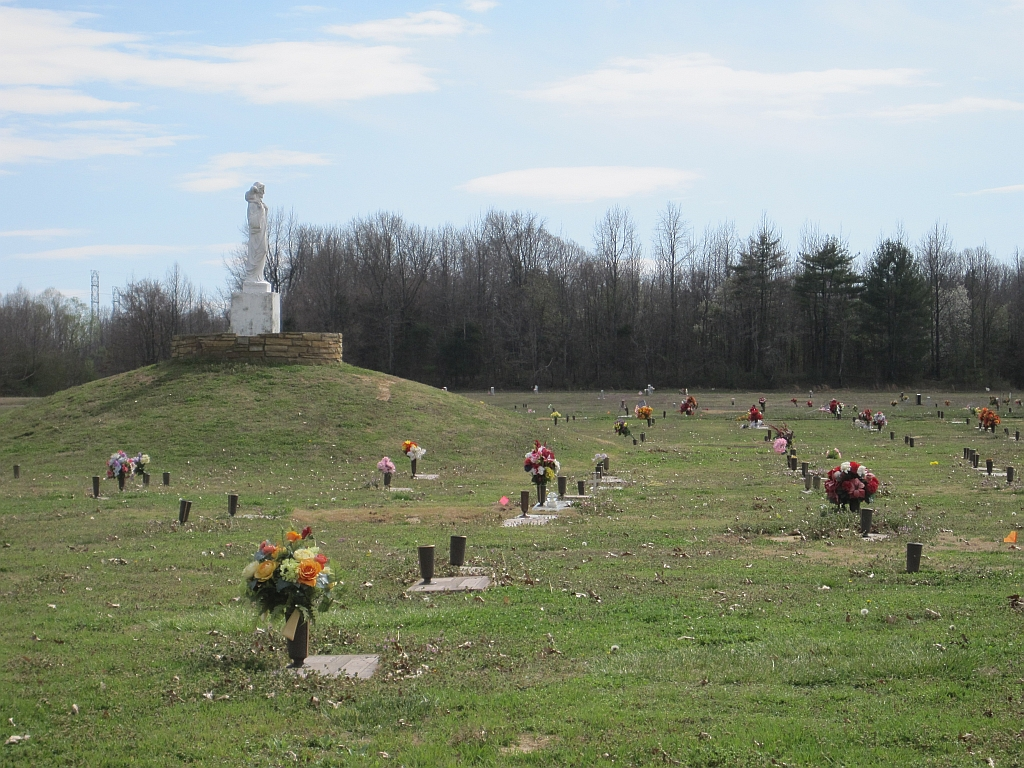
Forest Hill Cemetery South

Notable sites in South Memphis include the firehouse known as The Black Arts Alliance, Stax Museum, Elvis Presley's Graceland mansion, LeMoyne-Owen College, T. O. Fuller State Park, Southland Mall and the historic cemeteries Zion, Rose Hill, Mt Carmel, New Park, and Elmwood.

Several important highways run through South Memphis, including I-55, U.S. Route 51 (Elvis Presley Blvd), U.S. 61 (South Third) and U.S. 64.

== List of people from South Memphis ==
- D'Army Bailey- Civil Rights activist, judge and actor
- Maxine Smith - Civil Rights activist and Memphis City School Board member from 1971 to 1995
- Maurice White- Leader of Earth, Wind And Fire
- Harold Ford Jr.- United States Congressman from 1997 to 2007
- Aretha Franklin- Queen Of Soul
- Carla Thomas- singer
- Frank Hayden - artist
- Marion Barry- mayor of Washington D.C. from 1979 to 1990 and from 1995 to 1999
- Marquita Bradshaw, activist & Democratic candidate in the 2020 United States Senate election in Tennessee
- Willie Herenton- mayor of Memphis from 1992 to 2009
- Glenda Glover- first woman president of Tennessee State University
- Rosco Gordon- singer and musician
- Booker T. Jones- musician
- Frank Stokes- blues singer and musician
- Anita Ward- singer
- David Porter- songwriter
- Benjamin Hooks- Civil Rights lawyer and judge who was head of the NAACP from 1977 to 1993
- Gilbert E. Patterson- Presiding Bishop of COGIC from 2000 until his death in 2007
- Johnny Ace- 1950s R&B star
- Pooh Shiesty - rapper
- Big30 - rapper and childhood friend of fellow rapper Pooh Shiesty
- Key Glock- rapper
- Elise Neal- actress
- J. Blackfoot- singer
- Andrea Miller- first woman president of LeMoyne-Owen College
- DJ Paul- Academy Award-winning rapper and producer
- Tay Keith- producer
- Tommy Wright III-rapper and producer
- Tela- rapper
- Qyntel Woods- former NBA player, now plays for Lagun Aro GBC in Spain
- Playa Fly- rapper
- W. Herbert Brewster- gospel songwriter notably Mahalia Jackson's Move On Up A Little Higher
- Andre Turner - former NBA player known as 'The Little General'
- Thaddeus Young- NBA player
- Young Dolph- rapper (1985-2021)
- Blac Youngsta- rapper
- Rufus Jones- a member of the Tennessee House of Representatives from 1981 to 1996
- Lois DeBerry- first woman Speaker Pro Tempore in the Tennessee House of Representatives
- Ben Cauley- musician and original member of the Barkays, who was the lone survivor of the 1967 plane crash that claimed the lives of his bandmates and Otis Redding.
- Moneybagg Yo - rapper
- Big Scarr- rapper
- Eric Jerome Dickey-author
