= Crissy Haslam =

Former First Lady of Tennessee

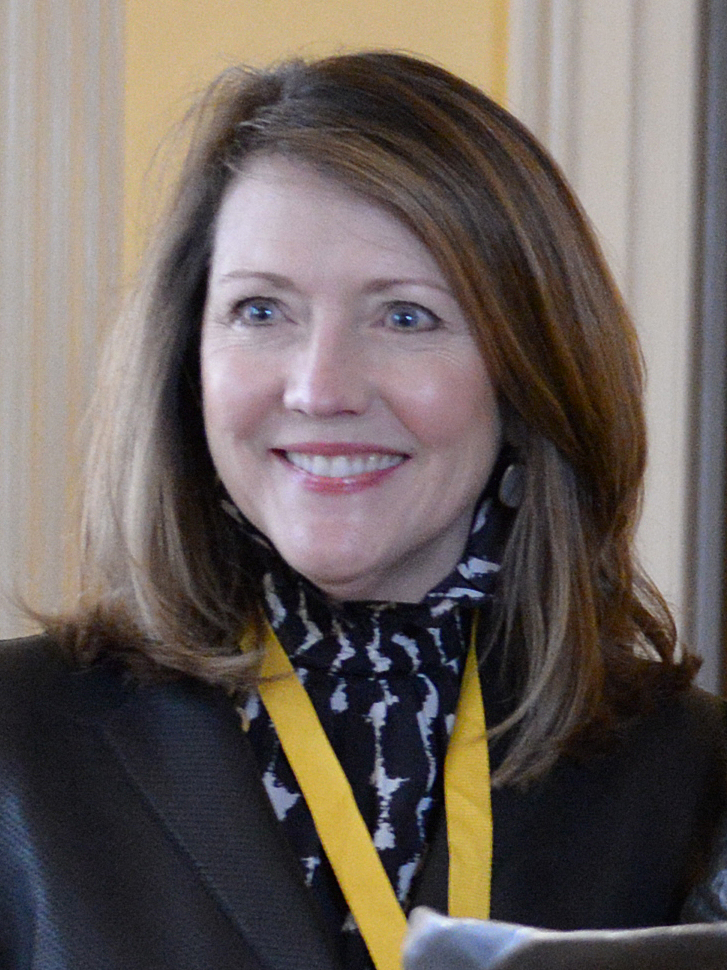
- Haslam in 2018

First Lady of Tennessee
- In role January 15, 2011 – January 19, 2019
- Governor: Bill Haslam
- Preceded by: Andrea Conte
- Succeeded by: Maria Lee

First Lady of Knoxville
- In role December 20, 2003 – January 10, 2011
- Preceded by: Joan Plumlee Ashe
- Succeeded by: Gene Monaco (as First Gentleman)

Personal details
- Born: Crissy Garrett; November 1958 (age 67–68) Houston, Texas
- Party: Republican
- Spouse: Bill Haslam (m. 1981)
- Children: 3
- Education: Emory University; University of Tennessee

Crissy Haslam (née Garrett, born November 1958) is an American philanthropist and children's and education advocate. She was the First lady of Tennessee from 2011 to 2019 and her husband, Bill Haslam, served as Governor of Tennessee for the same amount of time and the majority owner of the Nashville Predators of the National Hockey League (NHL)

== Early life and education ==
Haslam was born Crissy Garrett in November 1958 in Houston, Texas, to Chris and Ed Garrett. Later on in her youth, Haslam's family moved to Memphis, Tennessee, where she attended Saint Mary's Episcopal School. In 1980, she graduated from Emory University with majors in finance and marketing. She moved to Knoxville, where she worked as the assistant director of admissions at the University of Tennessee. In 1985, she received her master's degree in education.

== First Lady of Tennessee (2011-2019) ==
When Haslam's husband, Bill, was sworn in as Governor of Tennessee in 2011, she became first lady.

Haslam's activities as first lady focused on encouraging parents to become more engaged in children's education and reading proficiency.

On June 1, 2012, Haslam launched the Read20 Family Book Club, which had the goal to boost childhood literacy. The program encouraged parents to read with their children for at least 20 minutes a day. Haslam has been an avid supporter of Dolly Parton's Imagination Library, and expanding the efforts of the organization.

In addition to the Read20 Book Club, Haslam has launched Read20 Book Patrol, which is a reading program that encourages partnerships between children, families, and communities, with local law enforcement. The program is designed to also serve as a book provider program for low-income communities in Tennessee

== Personal life ==
Crissy Haslam married Bill Haslam in 1981 in Knoxville. They have three children and seven grandchildren. Haslam has served and volunteered for community organizations, such as the Love Kitchen, a provider of meals for Knoxville’s poor and home-bound population.
