= 1984 United States House of Representatives elections in Tennessee =

- November 6, 1984

All 9 Tennessee seats to the United States House of Representatives
| | Majority party | Minority party |
|---|---|---|
| Party | Democratic | Republican |
| Last election | 6 | 3 |
| Seats won | 6 | 3 |
| Seat change | Steady | Steady |
| Popular vote | 726,462 | 589,118 |
| Percentage | 55.21% | 44.77% |
| Swing | ▼4.14% | ▲4.83% |

Democratic hold
Republican hold
Democratic
50–60%
60–70%
70–80%
80–90%
90–100%
Republican
70–80%
90–100%

The 1984 congressional elections in Tennessee was held on November 6, 1984, to determine who will represent the state of Tennessee in the United States House of Representatives.

Following the 1984 elections, no seats changed hands, leaving the Tennessee delegation at a 6-3 Democratic majority.

== Overview ==
United States House of Representatives elections in Tennessee, 1984
| Party | Votes | Percentage | Seats | +/– |
|---|---|---|---|---|
| Democratic | 726,462 | 55.21% | 6 | — |
| Republican | 589,118 | 44.77% | 3 | — |
| Other | 115 | 0.01% | 0 | — |
| Totals | 1,315,735 | 100.00% | 9 | — |

Popular vote
| Democratic | 55.21% |
| Republican | 44.77% |
| Other | 0.01% |

House seats
| Democratic | 66.67% |
| Republican | 33.33% |

== By district ==
| District | Incumbent | | | This race | |
| District | Representative | Party | First elected | Results | Candidates |
|---|---|---|---|---|---|
| Tennessee 1 | Jimmy Quillen | Republican | 1962 | Incumbent re-elected. | ▌ ✓ Jimmy Quillen (Republican) 99.8% |
| Tennessee 2 | John Duncan Sr. | Republican | 1964 | Incumbent re-elected. | ▌ ✓ John Duncan Sr. (Republican) 77.3%; ▌John F. Bowen (Democratic) 22.7% |
| Tennessee 3 | Marilyn Lloyd | Democratic | 1974 | Incumbent re-elected. | ▌ ✓ Marilyn Lloyd (Democratic) 52.4%; ▌John Davis (Republican) 47.6% |
| Tennessee 4 | Jim Cooper | Democratic | 1982 | Incumbent re-elected. | ▌ ✓ Jim Cooper (Democratic) 75.2%; ▌James B. Seigneur (Republican) 24.8% |
| Tennessee 5 | Bill Boner | Democratic | 1978 | Incumbent re-elected. | ▌ ✓ Bill Boner (Democratic) 100% |
| Tennessee 6 | Al Gore | Democratic | 1976 | Incumbent retired to run for U.S. Senator. Democratic hold. | ▌ ✓ Bart Gordon (Democratic) 62.8%; ▌Joe Simpkins (Republican) 37.2% |
| Tennessee 7 | Don Sundquist | Republican | 1982 | Incumbent re-elected. | ▌ ✓ Don Sundquist (Republican) 100% |
| Tennessee 8 | Ed Jones | Democratic | 1969 | Incumbent re-elected. | ▌ ✓ Ed Jones (Democratic) 100% |
| Tennessee 9 | Harold Ford Sr. | Democratic | 1974 | Incumbent re-elected. | ▌ ✓ Harold Ford Sr. (Democratic) 71.5%; ▌William B. Thompson Jr. (Republican) 28.5% |

== See also ==
- 1984 United States presidential election in Tennessee
- 1984 United States Senate election in Tennessee
- 1984 United States elections
