= Mayoral elections in Knoxville, Tennessee =

Mayoral elections in Knoxville are held every four years to elect the mayor of Knoxville, Tennessee.

All Knoxville municipal elections are required to be non-partisan, but candidates can be affiliated with a political party. Knoxville uses a two-round system, where election runoffs are held if no candidate obtains the majority of the vote.

== 1983 ==
1983 Knoxville mayoral election
- September 27, 1983
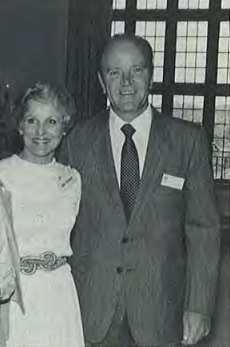

Candidate	Kyle Testerman	Arthur M. "Smiley" Blanchard
Popular vote	19,403	7,448
Percentage	62.75%	24.09%
Candidate	Lowell W. Ramsey
Popular vote	2,619
Percentage	8.47%
Mayor before election
Randy Tyree
Democratic
Elected mayor
Kyle Testerman
Republican

The 1983 Knoxville mayoral election took place on September 27, 1983, to elect the next mayor of Knoxville, Tennessee. The election was held concurrently with various other local elections. It saw the election of former Republican Mayor Kyle Testerman.

Results
Party	Candidate	Votes	%
Nonpartisan	Kyle Testerman	19,403	62.75
Nonpartisan	Arthur M. "Smiley" Blanchard	7,448	24.09
Nonpartisan	Lowell W. Ramsey	2,619	8.47
Nonpartisan	Robert L. "Bob" Cheek	973	3.15
Nonpartisan	Arnold Joseph Zandi	240	0.78
Nonpartisan	Karl Paul	185	0.60
Nonpartisan	Clyde Ledford	53	0.17
Nonpartisan	unknown candidate	1	0
Total votes		30,922	100
Republican gain from Democratic			

== 1987 ==
1987 Knoxville mayoral election
- September 29, 1987 (first round); November 3, 1987 (runoff)
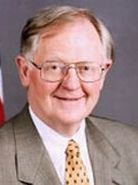

Candidate	Victor Ashe	Randy Tyree
First round	10,765; 43.85%	5,739; 23.38%
Runoff	18,892; 54.35%	15,853; 45.61%
Candidate	Jean Teague	Casey C. Jones
First round	5,210; 21.22%	2,543; 10.36%
Runoff	Eliminated	Eliminated
Mayor before election
Kyle Testerman
Republican
Elected mayor
Victor Ashe
Republican

The 1987 Knoxville mayoral election took place on November 3, 1987, to elect the mayor of Knoxville, Tennessee. The election was held concurrently with various other local elections and was officially nonpartisan. It saw the election of Victor Ashe.

Since no candidate secured a majority in the first round, a runoff election was held between the top two finishers, with Ashe defeating former mayor Randy Tyree.

=== Results ===
==== First round ====
First round results
Party	Candidate	Votes	%
Nonpartisan	Victor Ashe	10,765	43.85
Nonpartisan	Randy Tyree	5,739	23.38
Nonpartisan	Jean Teague	5,210	21.22
Nonpartisan	Casey C. Jones	2,543	10.36
Nonpartisan	Louis E. Royal	119	0.49
Nonpartisan	James T. "Jim" Garland	84	0.34
Nonpartisan	James Wesley Gilliam	45	0.18
Nonpartisan	Boyce T. McCall	43	0.18
Nonpartisan	Kyle C. Testerman	2	0.01
Total votes		24,550	

==== Runoff ====
Runoff results
Party	Candidate	Votes	%
Nonpartisan	Victor Ashe	18,892	54.35
Nonpartisan	Randy Tyree	15,853	45.61
Write-in	Jean Teague	4	0.01
Write-in	C. Howard Bozeman	2	0.01
Write-in	Willie Hambree	1	0.00
Write-in	Harry E. Hodge	1	0.00
Write-in	Steve Kidwell	1	0.00
Write-in	Louis A. McElroy II	1	0.00
Write-in	Ron Payne	1	0.00
Write-in	E. R. Shultz	1	0.00
Write-in	Kyle Testerman	1	0.00
Write-in	Robt O. Watson	1	0.00
Total votes		34,759	

== 1991 ==
1991 Knoxville mayoral election
- September 24, 1991
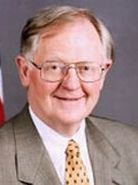

Candidate	Victor Ashe	C. Robertson
Popular vote	11,609	3,684
Percentage	72.20%	22.91%
Mayor before election
Victor Ashe
Republican
Elected mayor
Victor Ashe
Republican

The 1991 Knoxville mayoral election took place on September 24, 1991, to elect the mayor of Knoxville, Tennessee. The election was held concurrently with various other local elections. It saw the re-election of Republican Mayor Victor Ashe.

Results
Party	Candidate	Votes	%
Nonpartisan	Victor Ashe (incumbent)	11,609	72.20
Nonpartisan	C. Robertson	3,684	22.91
Nonpartisan	S. Evans	786	4.89
Total votes		16,079	100

== 1995 ==
1995 Knoxville mayoral election
- September 26, 1995
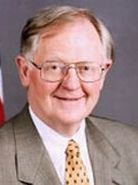

Candidate	Victor Ashe	Ivan Harmon
Popular vote	12,417	6,659
Percentage	63.70%	34.16%
Mayor before election
Victor Ashe
Republican
Elected mayor
Victor Ashe
Republican

The 1995 Knoxville mayoral election took place on September 26, 1995, to elect the mayor of Knoxville, Tennessee. The election was held concurrently with various other local elections. It saw the re-election of Republican Mayor Victor Ashe.

Results
Party	Candidate	Votes	%
Nonpartisan	Victor Ashe (incumbent)	12,417	63.70
Nonpartisan	Ivan Harmon	6,659	34.16
Nonpartisan	G. Hamilton	303	1.55
Nonpartisan	R. Watson	113	0.58
Total votes		19,492	100

== 1999 ==
1999 Knoxville mayoral election
- September 28, 1999
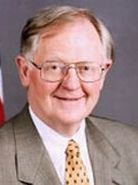

Candidate	Victor Ashe	Randy Tyree
Popular vote	10,248	5,613
Percentage	55.99%	30.67%
Candidate	Danny Mayfield
Popular vote	2,145
Percentage	11.72%
Mayor before election
Victor Ashe
Republican
Elected mayor
Victor Ashe
Republican

The 1999 Knoxville mayoral election took place on September 29, 1999, to elect the mayor of Knoxville, Tennessee. The election was held concurrently with various other local elections. It saw the re-election of Republican Mayor Victor Ashe, who defeated former Democratic Mayor Randy Tyree.

Results
Party	Candidate	Votes	%
Nonpartisan	Victor Ashe (incumbent)	10,248	55.99
Nonpartisan	Randy Tyree	5,613	30.67
Nonpartisan	Danny Mayfield	2,145	11.72
Nonpartisan	G. Hamilton Sr.	114	0.62
Nonpartisan	J. Madden	104	0.57
Nonpartisan	B. McCall	80	0.44
Total votes		18,304	100

== 2003 ==
2003 Knoxville mayoral election
- September 30, 2003

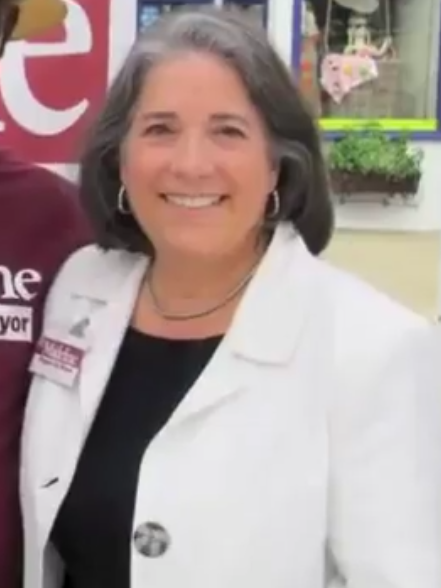
Candidate	Bill Haslam	Madeline Rogero
Popular vote	15,730	13,864
Percentage	52.64%	46.39%
Mayor before election
Victor Ashe
Republican
Elected mayor
Bill Haslam
Republican

The 2003 Knoxville mayoral election took place on September 30, 2003, to elect the mayor of Knoxville, Tennessee. The election was held concurrently with various other local elections. Republican candidate Bill Haslam defeated Democratic candidate Madeline Rogero with 52.6% of the vote.

Haslam reached a majority in the initial round of the election, forgoing the need for a runoff to be held.

=== Results ===
Results
Party	Candidate	Votes	%
Nonpartisan	Bill Haslam	15,730	52.64
Nonpartisan	Madeline Rogero	13,864	46.39
Nonpartisan	George Alexander Hamilton, Sr.	166	0.56
Nonpartisan	Boyce McCall	123	0.41
Total votes		29,883	100

== 2007 ==
2007 Knoxville mayoral election
- September 25, 2007

Candidate	Bill Haslam	Isa Infante
Popular vote	5,728	667
Percentage	87.32%	10.17%
Mayor before election
Bill Haslam
Republican
Elected mayor
Bill Haslam
Republican

The 2007 Knoxville mayoral election took place on September 25, 2007 to elect the mayor of Knoxville, Tennessee. The election was held concurrently with various other local elections; it was officially nonpartisan. It saw the re-election of incumbent Republican Bill Haslam.

Haslam reached a majority in the initial round of the election, forgoing the need for a runoff to be held.

=== Candidates ===
- Bill Haslam, incumbent mayor
- Isa Ifante, former college professor
- Mark Saroff

=== Results ===
Results
Party	Candidate	Votes	%
Nonpartisan	Bill Haslam (incumbent)	5,728	87.32
Nonpartisan	Isa Infante	667	10.17
Nonpartisan	Mark Saroff	165	2.52
Total votes		6,560	

== 2011 ==
2011 Knoxville mayoral election
- September 27, 2011 (first round); November 8, 2011 (runoff)
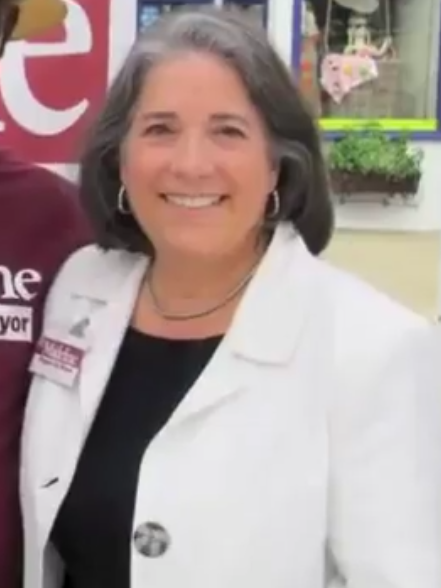

Candidate	Madeline Rogero	Mark Padgett
First round	8,242; 49.90%	3,741; 22.65%
Runoff	12,441; 58.50%	8,827; 41.50%
Candidate	Ivan Harmon
First round	3,537; 22.33%
Runoff	Eliminated
Mayor before election
Daniel Brown (acting)
Elected mayor
Madeline Rogero
Democratic

The 2011 Knoxville mayoral election took place on September 27 and November 8, 2011, to elect the mayor of Knoxville, Tennessee. The election was held concurrently with various other local elections and was officially nonpartisan. It saw the election of Democratic candidate Madeline Rogero.

Serving as acting mayor, following the resignation of Republican mayor Bill Haslam to serve as Governor of Tennessee and in the months before the individual elected in this race would take office, was Daniel Brown, who did not seek a full term as mayor.

Since no candidate secured a majority in the first round, a runoff was held between the top two finishers.

The election saw Rogero become the first woman elected mayor of Knoxville. She is also the first woman to be elected mayor in any of the "Big Four" cities of Tennessee (Memphis, Nashville, Knoxville, and Chattanooga).

=== Results ===
==== First round ====
First round results
Party	Candidate	Votes	%
Nonpartisan	Madeline Rogero	8,242	49.90
Nonpartisan	Mark Padgett	3,741	22.65
Nonpartisan	Ivan Harmon	3,537	22.33
Nonpartisan	Joe Hultquist	698	4.23
Nonpartisan	Bo Bennett	148	0.90
Total votes		16,518	

==== Runoff ====
Runoff results
Party	Candidate	Votes	%
Nonpartisan	Madeline Rogero	12,441	58.50
Nonpartisan	Mark Padgett	8,827	41.50
Total votes		21,268	
Democratic gain from Republican			

== 2015 ==
2015 Knoxville mayoral election
- September 29, 2015
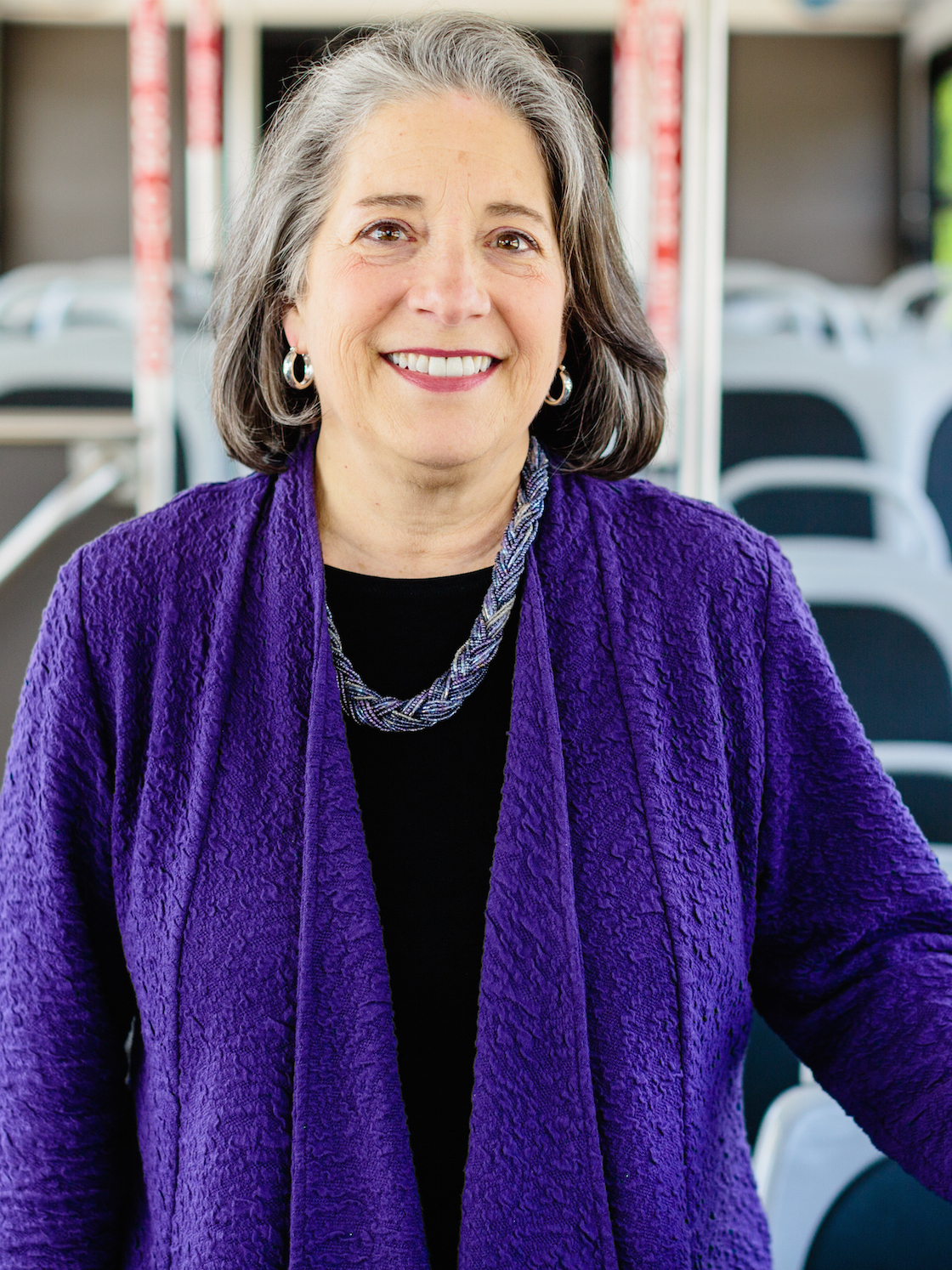
Candidate	Madeline Rogero
Popular vote	3,711
Percentage	98.78%
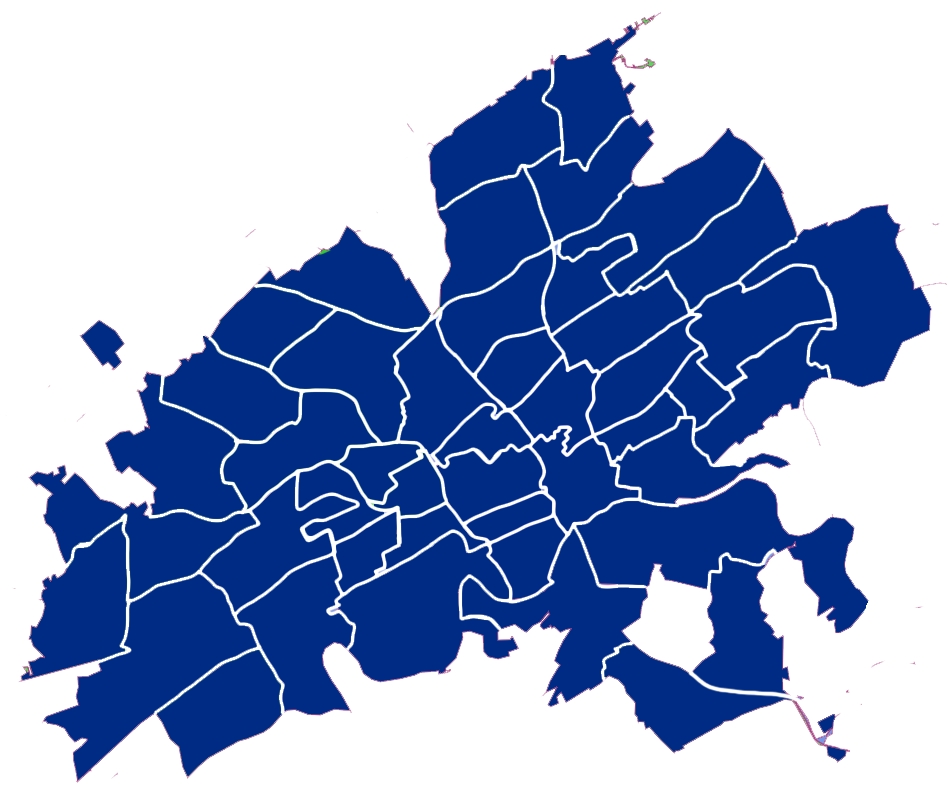
- Results by precinct Rogero: <90%
Mayor before election
Madeline Rogero
Democratic
Elected mayor
Madeline Rogero
Democratic

The 2015 Knoxville mayoral election took place on September 29, 2015 to elect the mayor of Knoxville, Tennessee. The election was held concurrently with various other local elections. Incumbent Democratic Mayor Madeline Rogero won re-election with 98.8% of the vote.

Since Rogero reached a majority in the initial round of the election, no runoff was held. This was set to be the case since only two candidates were on the ballot.

=== Results ===
First round results
Party	Candidate	Votes	%
Nonpartisan	Madeline Rogero (incumbent)	3,811	98.78
Write-in	Jack Knoxville	46	1.22
Total votes		3,757	

== 2019 ==
2019 Knoxville mayoral election
- August 27, 2019 (first round); November 5, 2019 (runoff)
Candidate	Indya Kincannon	Eddie Mannis
First round	5,568; 28.31%	7,005; 36.64%
Runoff	13,291; 52.41%	12,069; 47.59%
Candidate	Marshall Stair
First round	5,158; 26.87%
Runoff	Eliminated
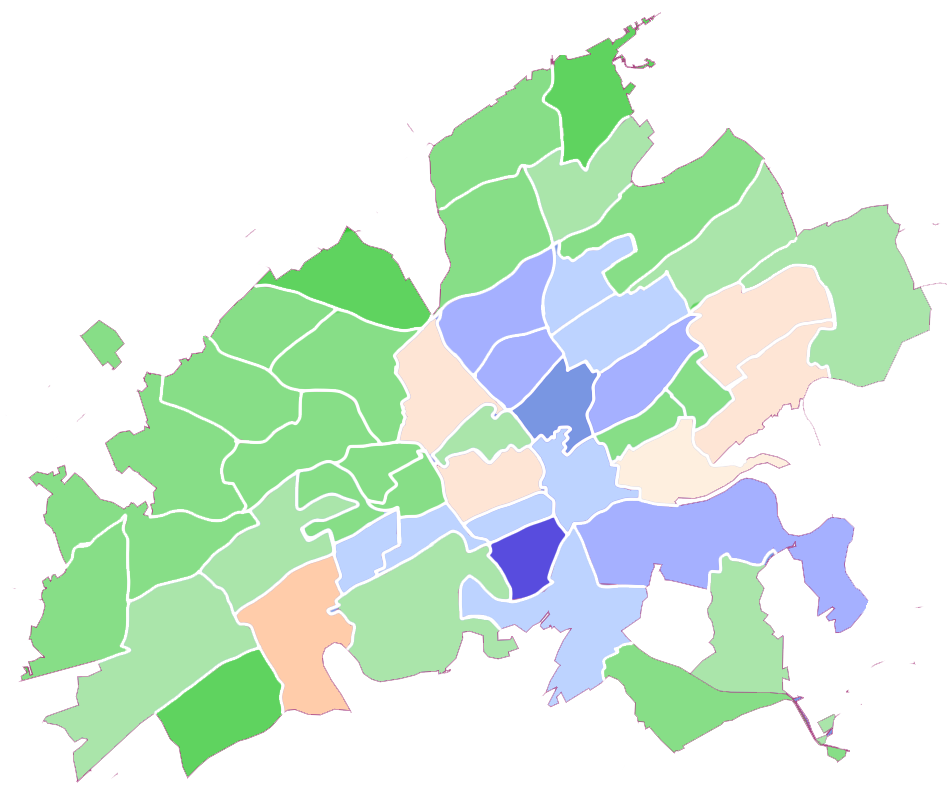
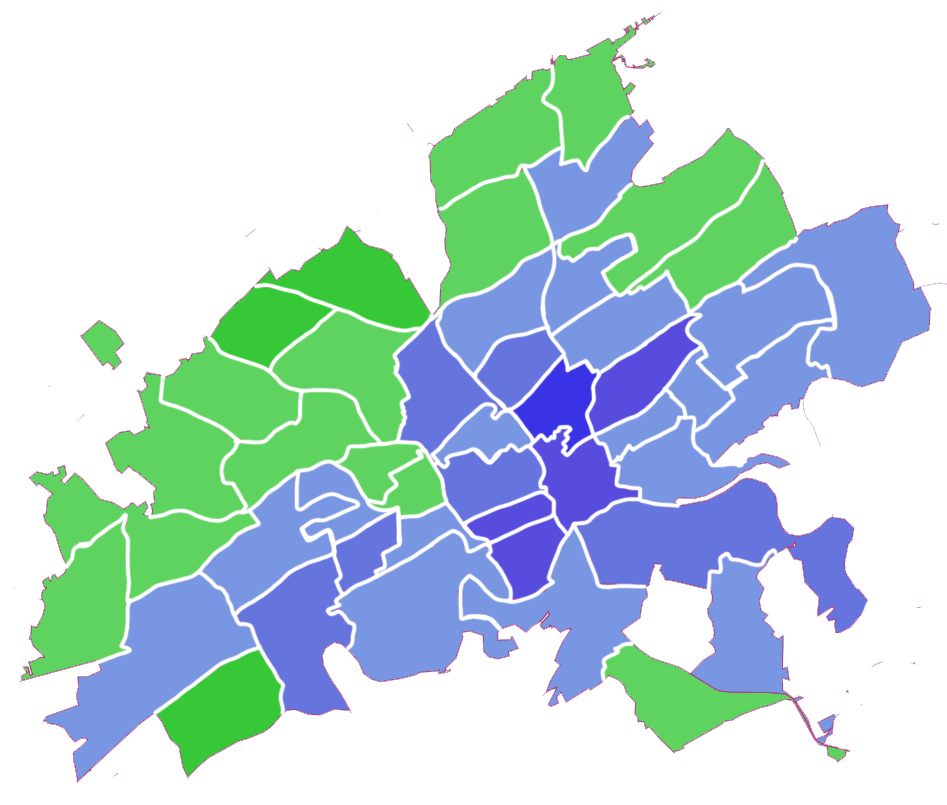
- Kincannon: 30–40% 40–50% 50–60% 60–70% 70–80% 80–90% Mannis: 30–40% 40–50% 50–60% 60–70% Stair: 20–30% 30–40% 40–50%
Mayor before election
Madeline Rogero
Democratic
Elected mayor
Indya Kincannon
Democratic

The 2019 Knoxville mayoral Election took place on August 27, 2019, and November 5, 2019, to elect the next mayor of Knoxville, Tennessee. The election was held concurrently with various other local elections. All Knoxville municipal elections are non-partisan.

Since no candidate met 50% or more of the votes, Republican candidate Eddie Mannis and Democratic candidate Indya Kincannon advanced to the November election. Indya Kincannon won the runoff election with 52.4% of the vote.

Incumbent Democratic Mayor Madeline Rogero was ineligible to run for re-election, having served the maximum of two terms.

=== Candidates ===
Declared

- Michael Andrews, licensed barber
- Fletcher Burkhardt, social media specialist
- Indya Kincannon, former Knox County School Board member (2004–2014), former chair of the Knox County School Board, former city director for Mayor Rogero
- Eddie Mannis, former COO and deputy to Mayor Rogero, chairman of the Metropolitan Airport Authority, prominent businessman
- Calvin Taylor Skinner, worked in community and leadership development
- Marshall Stair, lawyer, at-large member of the Knoxville City Council (2011–2019)

=== Results ===
==== First round ====
First round results
Party	Candidate	Votes	%
Nonpartisan	Eddie Mannis	7,005	36.64
Nonpartisan	Indya Kincannon	5,568	28.31
Nonpartisan	Marshall Stair	5,158	26.87
Nonpartisan	Fletcher "Knoxville" Burkhardt	591	3.09
Nonpartisan	Calvin Taylor Skinner	493	2.58
Nonpartisan	Michael W. Andrews	301	1.57
Total votes		19,116	

==== Runoff ====
In the runoff election, Indya Kincannon defeated Eddie Mannis.

Runoff results
Party	Candidate	Votes	%
Nonpartisan	Indya Kincannon	13,291	52.41
Nonpartisan	Eddie Mannis	12,069	47.59
Total votes		25,360	100

== 2023 ==
2023 Knoxville mayoral election
- August 29, 2023
Candidate	Indya Kincannon	Jeff Talman
Popular vote	9,431	4,808
Percentage	57.52%	29.32%
Candidate	Constance Every	R. C. Lawhorn
Popular vote	1,328	830
Percentage	8.10%	5.06%
- Kincannon: 40–50% 50–60% 60–70% 70–80% 80–90% Talman: 40–50% Tie: 40–50% No data: 40–50%
Mayor before election
Indya Kincannon
Democratic
Elected mayor
Indya Kincannon
Democratic

The 2023 Knoxville mayoral election took place on August 29, 2023 to elect the mayor of Knoxville, Tennessee. The election was held concurrently with various other local elections. All Knoxville municipal elections are non-partisan. Since Kincannon won a majority of the vote in the initial round, no runoff was needed. Incumbent Democratic Mayor Indya Kincannon was elected with 57.5% of the vote, defeating Republican Candidate Jeff Talman.

Indya Kincannon announced her re-election campaign on November 16, 2022. She was sworn in on December 16, 2023.

=== Candidates ===
Declared

- Indya Kincannon, incumbent mayor
- Constance Every, nonprofit founder
- R.C. Lawhorn, businessman
- Jeff Talman, mortgage banker and president of the Knoxville Volunteer Rotary Club

=== Results ===
Results
Party	Candidate	Votes	%
Nonpartisan	Indya Kincannon (incumbent)	9,431	57.52
Nonpartisan	Jeff Talman	4,808	29.32
Nonpartisan	Constance Every	1,328	8.10
Nonpartisan	R.C. Lawhorn	830	5.06
Total votes		16,397	100

== See also ==
- Elections in Tennessee
- Political party strength in Tennessee
- Government of Tennessee
- Mayoral elections in Chattanooga, Tennessee
- Mayoral elections in Clarksville, Tennessee
- Mayoral elections in Jackson, Tennessee
- Mayoral elections in Murfreesboro, Tennessee
