= Bill Haslam =

American businessman & politician (born 1958)

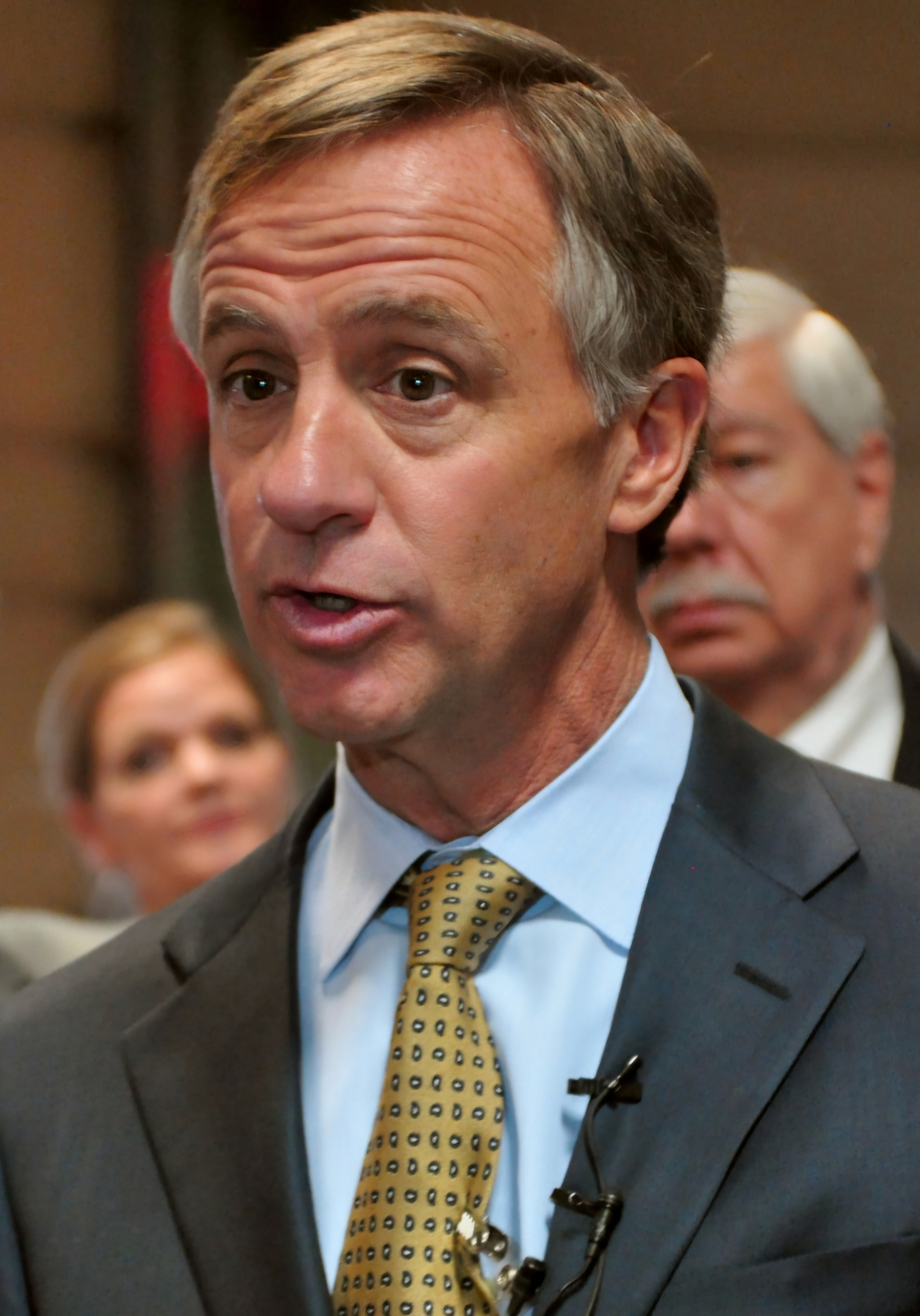
- Haslam in 2014

49th Governor of Tennessee
- In office January 15, 2011 – January 19, 2019
- Lieutenant: Ron Ramsey; Randy McNally
- Preceded by: Phil Bredesen
- Succeeded by: Bill Lee

Chair of the Republican Governors Association
- In office November 16, 2017 – November 29, 2018
- Preceded by: Scott Walker
- Succeeded by: Pete Ricketts

67th Mayor of Knoxville
- In office December 20, 2003 – January 10, 2011
- Preceded by: Victor Ashe
- Succeeded by: Daniel Brown (acting)

Personal details
- Born: William Edward Haslam; August 23, 1958 (age 68) Knoxville, Tennessee, U.S.
- Party: Republican
- Spouse: Crissy Garrett (m. 1981)
- Children: 3
- Education: Emory University (BA)
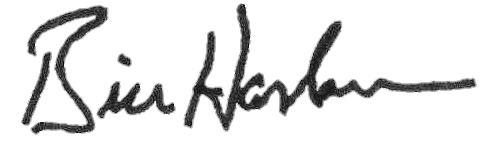
- Signature

William Edward Haslam (/ˈhæzləm/; born August 23, 1958) is an American billionaire businessman and politician who served as the 49th governor of Tennessee from 2011 to 2019. A member of the Republican Party, Haslam previously served as the 67th mayor of Knoxville, Tennessee. He is also the majority owner of the Nashville Predators, having bought the team from Herb Fritch in July 2025, and co-owner of a minor league baseball team, the Knoxville Smokies.

Haslam was born in Knoxville and attended Emory University in Atlanta, Georgia. After graduating, he joined Pilot Corporation, founded by his father Jim. In the 1990s, he served as its president, with Jim being the chairman and his brother Jimmy being the CEO. From 1999 to 2001, he was CEO of the e-commerce and cataloging division at the department store chain Saks Fifth Avenue. He then became a consultant at Saks and later served on the board of directors at Harold's Stores, Inc.

In 2003, Haslam was elected mayor of Knoxville, earning 52% of the vote. A total vote of 87% afforded him re-election in 2007. In 2009, he announced that he would be running to succeed Phil Bredesen as Governor of Tennessee; winning the Republican primary with 47% of the vote, he went on to handily defeat businessman Mike McWherter, the Democratic candidate, in the general election. His margin of victory increased in 2014.

A 2015 Forbes article estimated Haslam's net worth at $2 billion, making him the nation's wealthiest elected official at that time. He was the wealthiest state governor in the United States until January 2019, when JB Pritzker, a member of the Pritzker family, became Governor of Illinois.

In the fall of 2019, Haslam became a visiting professor of political science at Vanderbilt University.

== Early life, education, and business career ==
Haslam was born in 1958 in Knoxville, Tennessee, the third child of Jim Haslam, the founder of Pilot Corporation, the parent company of the convenience store and travel center chain, Pilot Flying J, and his wife, Cynthia (Allen). Jim Haslam has been a Republican Party fundraiser and University of Tennessee donor and trustee for several decades.

Haslam was educated at the Webb School of Knoxville, where he became active in the Christian group Young Life. He later attended Emory University, graduating with a bachelor's degree in history in 1980. He is a member of the Beta Chi chapter of the Sigma Chi International Fraternity.

As a teenager, Haslam began working part-time in his father's corporation. He had made plans to teach history and eventually become a minister. Following his university graduation, he returned to Knoxville to work for Pilot in hopes of learning more about the business world before entering the seminary, and eventually decided to stay with the company. He was elevated to president of the company (with his brother, Jimmy, as CEO, and father as chairman) in 1995.

In 1999, Haslam joined Saks Fifth Avenue as the chief executive officer of the e-commerce and catalog division. He left Saks in 2001, and joined the board of the Dallas-based clothing chain, Harold's Stores Inc., later that year.

Haslam is one of the owners of the Tennessee Smokies, a minor league baseball team in East Tennessee. His brother, current Pilot Flying J CEO Jimmy Haslam, became majority owner of the Cleveland Browns in 2012.

== Mayor of Knoxville ==
In 2002, Haslam announced he was running for Mayor of Knoxville, inspired in part by a conversation he had had with then-Chattanooga mayor (and later United States Senator) Bob Corker. Knoxville's mayoral elections are nominally non-partisan, but Haslam was known to be a member of the Republican Party when he ran for the office. His opponent in the race, Knox County commissioner Madeline Rogero, criticized Haslam as an oil company puppet, and blamed his father for the appointment of controversial University of Tennessee president John Shumaker, an attack Haslam dismissed as "petty, personal politics". On September 30, 2003, he defeated Rogero by a 52% to 46% margin. He was sworn in in December 2003.

In 2006, Haslam appointed Rogero director of community development, later stating he had read Doris Kearns Goodwin's Team of Rivals, and was inspired by President Abraham Lincoln's decision to appoint former campaign rivals to his cabinet. He was reelected in 2007, winning 87% of the vote against challengers Isa Infante and Mark Saroff.

Haslam identifies several successful historic preservation initiatives among his accomplishments as mayor, including saving the historic S&W Cafeteria in downtown Knoxville, building a new cinema (the Regal Riviera) in the city's downtown, and revitalizing the historic Bijou Theatre. In 2008, he was appointed to a four-year term on the Advisory Council on Historic Preservation by U.S. President George W. Bush.

Along with historical preservation efforts, Haslam helped spur residential and retail growth in the downtown area, mainly by offering developers tax subsidies. He helped implement a master plan for the development of the South Knoxville riverfront, which was given an Outstanding Planning Award by the Tennessee Chapter of the American Planning Association. The Haslam administration operated under a balanced budget policy, which helped to double the city's savings during his first term.

== Gubernatorial elections ==
=== Elections ===
==== 2010 ====
Final results by county in 2010: Bill Haslam: 80–90%; 70–80%; 60–70%; 50–60%; Mike McWherter: 50–60%; 40–50%

On January 6, 2009, Haslam declared his intention to run for Tennessee governor in 2010.

His campaign received contributions of $3.9 million between January and July 1, 2009, substantially more than his Republican primary rivals. Lieutenant Governor Ron Ramsey received $1.3 million and U.S. Congressman Zach Wamp received $1.2 million, while Shelby County District Attorney General Bill Gibbons reported $416,000 at that time. Among Democratic candidates, businessman Mike McWherter raised $650,000 at the mid-year, followed by former State House Majority Leader Kim McMillan's $180,000.

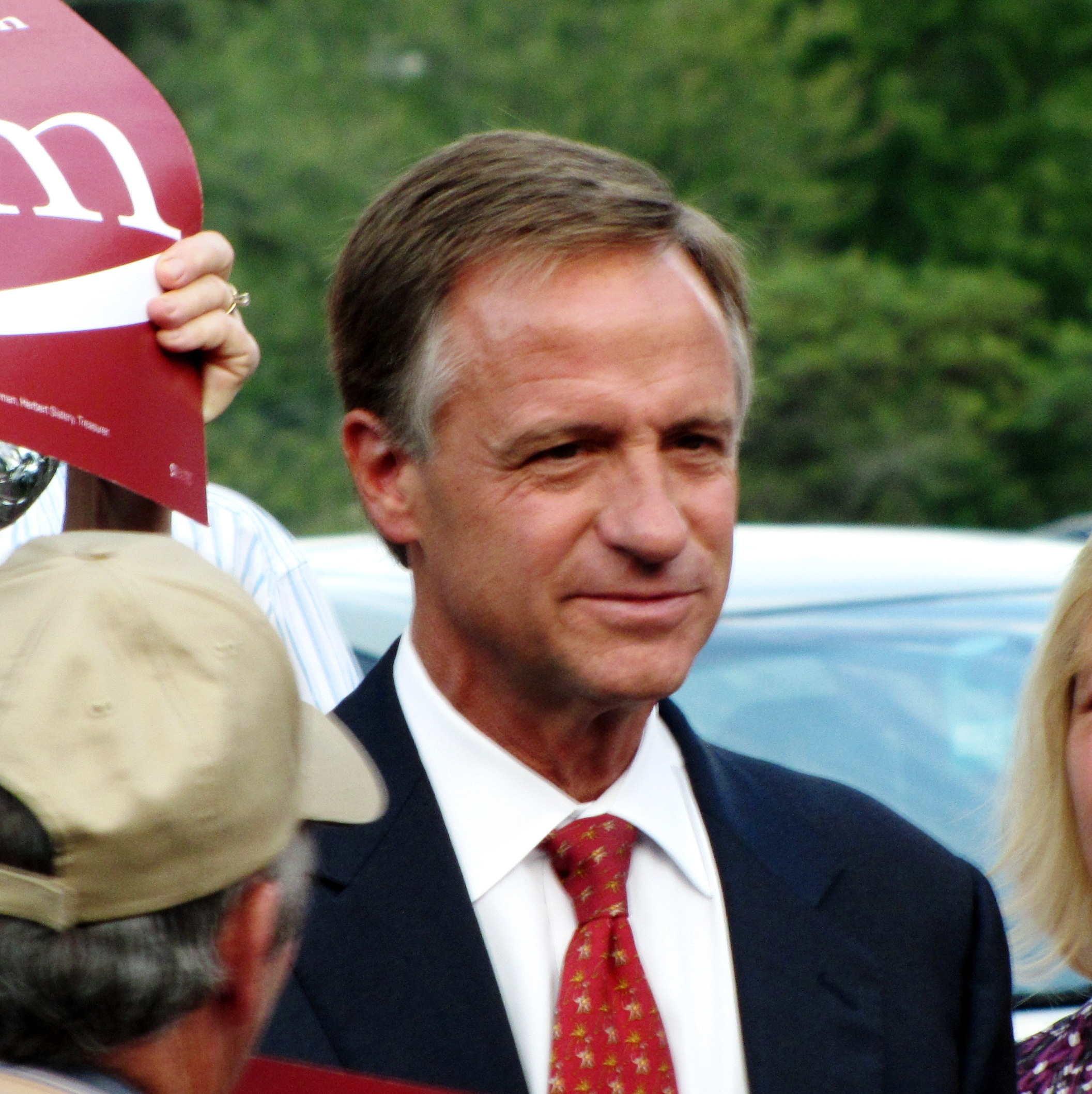
Haslam addressing supporters before the Highlands Town Hall Debate during the 2010 campaign

Haslam received endorsements from former U.S. Senator Howard Baker and Congressman Jimmy Duncan. The Tennessean wrote, "Haslam appears most likely to be able to ride Gov. Phil Bredesen's pro-business coattails, despite the different party affiliation."

On the Republican side from July 1, 2009, until January 15, 2010, Haslam collected $1.8 million, Ramsey raised $1,412,593 including a $200,000 loan, Wamp raised $1,373,078 including a $61,000 loan, and Gibbons raised $225,218. Among Democrats during the six months, State Senate Minority Leader Jim Kyle collected $741,485 including a $300,000 personal loan, McWherter raised $402,868, and McMillan raised $159,981.

Haslam campaigned on his executive experience as both Knoxville's mayor and the president of a major company. His opponents attacked him as an oil executive, especially in the wake of price-gouging allegations levied against Pilot in the wake of the post-Hurricane Katrina fuel shortages, and criticized his refusal to release information related to his income while at Pilot.

On August 5, 2010, Haslam won in the Republican primary for governor with almost 48% of the vote, compared to 29% for Wamp and 22% for Ramsey. Mike McWherter, son of former Governor Ned McWherter, was nominated by the Democrats after several well-known elected officials declined the candidacy.

On November 2, 2010, Haslam won the gubernatorial election over Democratic candidate Mike McWherter, taking 65% of the vote to McWherter's 35%. The Republicans also increased their majorities in both chambers of the state legislature, giving the GOP complete control of state government for the first time since 1869.

==== 2014 ====
Final results by county in 2014: Bill Haslam: 80–90%; 70–80%; 60–70%; 50–60%

Haslam announced he would run for re-election in 2014. He defeated three other candidates in the Republican primary with 88% of the vote.

In the general election on November 4, 2014, Haslam defeated Democratic nominee Charles Brown with over 70% of the vote and won every county.

== Tenure as governor ==
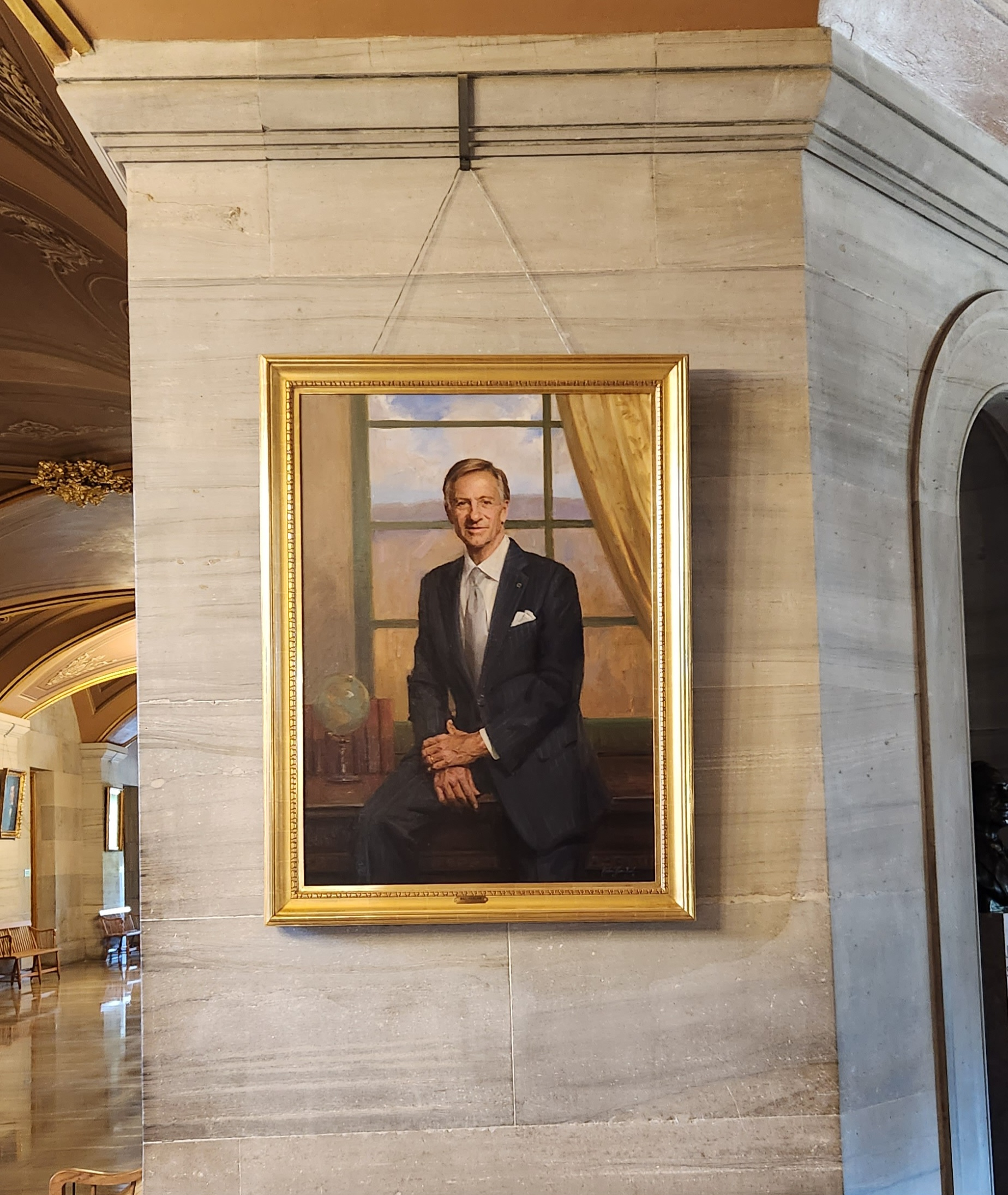
Official portrait of Bill Haslam, hanging in the Tennessee State Capitol

=== 2011 ===
Haslam stated that job creation and long-term economic growth were his top priority as governor, followed by education reform and workforce development. On June 16, 2011, Haslam signed a $30.8 billion state budget, a 3.9% decrease from the previous year's budget.

The budget included 1.6% pay raise for state employees (though it also called for over 1,300 positions to be cut), grants to facilitate construction of an Electrolux plant near Memphis and a Wacker Chemie plant near Cleveland, and $10 million for the Memphis Research Consortium. The budget bill also contained an amendment cutting off all state funding to Planned Parenthood, but the measure was negated by an amendment inserted into the same bill by an unknown legislator, something Haslam vowed to correct in 2012.

On May 23, 2011, Haslam signed a bill overturning a Nashville ordinance that barred discrimination against queer employees for any companies awarded city contracts. On June 1, Haslam signed a bill requiring voters to present photo identification at polling places, a measure supporters argue prevents voter fraud, but detractors have derided as an attempt to disenfranchise traditionally-Democratic voting blocs. On June 2, Haslam signed a bill replacing public school teachers' collective bargaining rights with a process called "collaborative conferencing", effectively bypassing the teachers' union, the Tennessee Education Association.

Other legislation signed by Haslam included a tort reform measure that limits non-economic damages in civil suits, a bill that lifted the cap on the number charter schools in the state and opened enrollment in charter schools to more students, and a bill that allows college students to use Hope Scholarship funds during summer semesters.

In October 2011, Haslam approved an order to implement a curfew on Legislative Plaza in downtown Nashville next to the capitol, where several hundred protesters with the Occupy Nashville movement (part of the greater Occupy Wall Street movement) were camping out. In the early morning hours of October 28, 29 protesters were arrested when they refused to comply with the order, and on the following day, 26 were arrested. In both cases, the arrests were thrown out by General Sessions Night Court Commissioner Tom Nelson, who ruled that the state had no authority to set a curfew for Legislative Plaza. Haslam stated the curfew was necessary due to deteriorating sanitary conditions and safety issues on the Plaza, though critics, including the American Civil Liberties Union, which filed a lawsuit in federal court on October 31 to halt the arrests, have stated that the curfew is a violation of the protesters' civil rights.

=== 2012 ===
The $31 billion budget bill signed by Haslam for 2012 included $50 million in tax cuts, $560 million for construction projects, a 2.5% pay raise for state employees, and additional funding to offset anticipated tuition hikes at state colleges. In June, Haslam signed bills that eliminated the state's gift tax and reduced the state's inheritance tax and the sales tax on groceries. He also signed the "Fast Track" bill, which provided cash grants to companies seeking to expand or relocate to Tennessee.

Tennessee was granted a waiver requested by Haslam from certain portions of the federal government's No Child Left Behind standards. Haslam argued that the law's Adequate Yearly Progress model labelled some state schools as failures in spite of these schools having made substantial improvement. In May, he signed a bill providing $37 million in grants for state schools. In July, Haslam called for an overhaul of the state's higher education system, with the intention of generating a higher number of college graduates in high-paying fields.

In March 2012, the legislature passed a bill protecting teachers who challenged scientific theories such as the theory of evolution and global warming in the classroom. Critics assailed the measure as a "monkey bill" that was little more than an attempt to allow creationism to be taught in science classes. While Haslam refused to sign the bill, he also refused to veto it, effectively allowing it to become law. He criticized the bill for creating confusion rather than clarity, but pointed out the legislature had passed it by a large margin, and argued the bill would have no effect on the state's science curriculum.

On March 8, 2012, Haslam instructed his Health and Wellness Task Force to focus on the state's growing obesity problem, noting that nearly one-third of Tennesseans are obese. In early April, he initiated the "Meth Stops Now" campaign, aimed at informing the public of the consequences of methamphetamine manufacture. In May, he signed legislation aimed at curbing prescription drug abuse.

On April 24, 2012, Haslam signed into law the Tennessee Excellence, Accountability and Management ("TEAM") Act, which established a new hiring system for state agencies and overhauled the evaluation standards for state employees by placing a greater focus on job performance rather than seniority. The bill also makes it easier for executive branch employees to be hired and fired, establishes merit raises for high performing workers, and gives preference to veterans in job openings where applicants have equal qualifications.

In May 2012, Haslam signed a bill barring sex education instructors from encouraging "gateway sexual activity." Proponents of the bill argued it was necessary to clarify the meaning of abstinence, while opponents argued the bill's wording was overly vague, and could be construed to include behavior such as kissing and holding hands. Other bills signed by Haslam in May included a measure requiring drug testing for welfare recipients, a measure providing grants to companies to pay for training expenses for recently laid-off workers, and a bill requiring Amazon.com to start collecting sales taxes on online purchases by 2014.

After the General Assembly permanently adjourned in May, Haslam issued the first veto of his governorship. He vetoed a controversial bill that sought to end Vanderbilt University's "All Comers" policy, which required religious groups at the school to allow any student to join even if the student didn't share the group's religious beliefs. The legislature could not override the veto because it was no longer in session. Haslam stated he disagreed with the policy, but didn't think it appropriate for the government to interfere with the policies of a private institution.

In December 2012, Haslam announced the state would not implement a provision of the Affordable Care Act ("Obamacare") that allows for a state-run health care exchange. Haslam had considered a state-run exchange for several weeks, but argued the federal government had not provided enough information regarding costs of the program, and what had been provided consisted of draft proposals subject to change. "More and more I'm convinced they are making this up as they go," he said.

=== 2014 ===
In April 2014, Haslam signed into law a measure allowing prosecution of a new mother with criminal assault if she had used narcotics during pregnancy. The law has been criticised as discriminatory against women from poor rural areas with limited access to healthcare and addiction treatment facilities. In July 2014, the first woman prosecuted under this law was arrested in Madisonville, Monroe County.

=== 2016 ===
In April 2016, Haslam vetoed a bill to make the Bible the official book of Tennessee. The bill, sponsored by State Sen. Steve Southerland, R-Morristown, passed in both the State House and the Senate. If signed by Haslam, it would have made Tennessee the first state to make the Bible its state book. Haslam vetoed the bill on April 14, 2016. An attempt to override the veto failed in the State House, garnering 43 votes, short of the threshold of 50 needed to override.

Haslam took part in the 16-member search committee to select a new chancellor for the Tennessee Board of Regents. He continued to take part in restructuring the Board, which included the implementation of the FOCUS Act.

=== 2017 ===
In April 2017, Haslam signed the IMPROVE Act into law. The bill, which stands for "Improving Manufacturing, Public Roads, and Opportunities for a Vibrant Economy," cut the state sales tax on food from five to four percent, increased the gasoline and diesel fuel taxes by six and ten cents, respectively, raised the tax on natural gas by eight cents, increased vehicle registration fees, and instituted a new $100 annual fee for electric vehicles. Its primary purpose was for TDOT to fund a $10 billion backlog of 962 needed highway projects. A similar plan called the Better Roads Program was initiated by then-governor Lamar Alexander in 1986.

In May 2017, Haslam signed HB 1111/SB 1085 into law. The bill was seen by the Human Rights Campaign as an attempt to challenge Obergefell v. Hodges and undermine same-sex marriage in Tennessee, and Haslam was criticized by the Tennessee Chapter of the American Civil Liberties Union (ACLU) and the Tennessee Equality Project (TEP) for signing it into law.

== Political positions ==
=== Taxes and budget ===
Haslam favors a conservative state budget that keeps taxes low in order to create and maintain a business-friendly environment. While he largely supports budget cuts, Haslam has suggested that the Republican Party is too often focused on scaling back government rather than making it work. "At the end of the day," he said, "I think the most conservative principle there is, is giving people a dollar worth of value for a dollar worth of tax paid."

=== Gun laws ===
Haslam was formerly a member of the Mayors Against Illegal Guns Coalition, but he resigned early in 2009 and became a member of the National Rifle Association of America. When a candidate for governor, Haslam said he would sign a constitutional carry bill, but as governor, he opposed constitutional carry.

=== Abortion ===
Haslam is against abortion.

=== Education ===
As Governor, Haslam implemented education reform programs that offered tuition-free access to higher education. The Tennessee Promise program, launched in 2014, provides two years of tuition-free access for high school graduates to attend community or technical college. The Tennessee Reconnect program provides tuition-free access for most of the state's adults to earn an associate degree or technical certificate. Haslam framed the education reforms as part of economic development, as the state sought to provide its workforce with more skills and thus attract businesses to the state.

=== LGBT issues ===
Haslam opposes same-sex marriage, though he has stated that he wouldn't discriminate against gay employees. In May 2017, he signed a bill requiring the so-called "natural and ordinary meaning" of words in state law and government forms be used unless those words are specifically defined. This law will make it more difficult for same-sex couples to adopt children, pleasing socially conservative groups like the Family Action Council of Tennessee. The latter lobbied heavily for this bill to be passed, in order to ensure Tennessee courts only accept a 'traditional' definition of family. LGBT organization GLAAD issued a statement that Governor Haslam "has now placed the future of the state’s economy and the well-being of the LGBTQ community in jeopardy.”

=== Immigration laws ===
Haslam has said he favors cracking down on businesses that employ illegal immigrants, and suggested he would sign a law requiring law enforcement officers to check the citizenship status of arrested individuals they suspect might be in the country illegally, if passed by the state legislature.

=== Other ===
On January 11, 2012, Bill Haslam endorsed Mitt Romney for the Republican nomination in the 2012 United States presidential election. This announcement came on the heels of Romney's victory in the New Hampshire primary on January 10. Haslam's father was the Tennessee state co-chairman for the Romney campaign.

In a 2013 interview with Politico, Haslam stated that many of the more controversial measures passed by the state legislature, such as the 2012 law protecting teachers who dispute evolution in class, were "frustrating and a distraction." He noted that in his travels across the state, "those aren't the issues I hear people bringing up."

Haslam signed a bill into law to loosen restrictions on high-interest payday lenders in Tennessee.

== Post-governorship ==
After US Senator Lamar Alexander announced that he would not seek re-election in 2020, speculation began to arise that Haslam would run for the seat. Haslam announced in July 2019 that he would not do so.

In June 2022, Bill Haslam agreed to become the new owner of the NHL's Nashville Predators "through a multi-phased acquisition transaction". Haslam, whose brother, Jimmy, co-owns the NFL's Cleveland Browns with his wife, Dee, reached an agreement with the franchise's present ownership group, which is chaired by Herbert Fritch and includes at least 17 others. He became the majority owner of the Predators on July 1, 2025.

In May 2023, U.S. Senator and 2024 presidential candidate Tim Scott appointed Haslam as national co-chair of his 2024 campaign.

== Personal life ==
Haslam met his wife, Crissy Garrett, at Emory University and they have been married since 1981; with one son and two daughters and eight grandchildren. Haslam is a Presbyterian, and is a longtime member of Cedar Springs Presbyterian Church, an Evangelical Presbyterian Church congregation in Knoxville. He attends Christ Presbyterian Church when in Nashville. Haslam has been a member of the Young Life Board of Trustees since 2011.

== Electoral history ==
Knoxville mayoral election, 2003
Party	Candidate	Votes	%
Nonpartisan	Bill Haslam	15,730	52.64
Nonpartisan	Madeline Rogero	13,864	46.39
Nonpartisan	George Alexander Hamilton Sr.	166	0.56
Nonpartisan	Boyce McCall	123	.41

Knoxville mayoral election, 2007
Party	Candidate	Votes	%
Nonpartisan	Bill Haslam (incumbent)	5,728	87.32
Nonpartisan	Isa Infante	667	10.17
Nonpartisan	Mark Saroff	165	2.52

Tennessee Governor Republican Primary Election, 2010
Party	Candidate	Votes	%
Republican	Bill Haslam	343,817	47.40
Republican	Zach Wamp	211,735	29.19
Republican	Ron Ramsey	159,555	22.00
Republican	Joe Kirkpatrick	6,787	0.94
Republican	Basil Marceaux Sr.	3,514	0.48

Tennessee Governor Election, 2010
Party	Candidate	Votes	%
Republican	Bill Haslam	1,041,545	65.03
Democratic	Mike McWherter	529,851	33.08
Independent	Carl Twofeathers Whitaker	6,536	0.41
Independent	Brandon Dodds	4,728	0.30
Independent	Bayron Binkley	4,663	0.29
Independent	June Griffin	2,587	0.16
Independent	Linda Kay Perry	2,057	0.13
Independent	Howard Switzer	1,887	0.12
Independent	Samuel David Duck	1,755	0.11
Independent	Thomas Smith, II	1,207	0.08
Independent	Toni Hall	993	0.06
Independent	David Gatchell	859	0.05
Independent	Boyce McCall	828	0.05
Independent	James Reesor	809	0.05
Independent	Mike Knois	600	0.04
Independent	Donald Ray McFolin	583	0.04
Write-in	Basil Marceaux	58	0.00
Write-in	James Lee	3	0.00

Tennessee Governor Republican Primary Election, 2014
Party	Candidate	Votes	%
Republican	Bill Haslam	570,997	87.68
Republican	Mark Coonrippy Brown	44,165	6.78
Republican	Donald Ray McFolin	22,968	3.53
Republican	Basil Marceaux Sr.	13,117	2.01

Tennessee Governor Election, 2014
Party	Candidate	Votes	%
Republican	Bill Haslam	951,796	70.31
Democratic	Charles "Charlie" Brown	309,237	22.84
Independent	John Jay Hooker	30,579	2.26
Constitution	Shaun Crowell	26,580	1.96
Green	Isa Infante	18,570	1.37
Independent	Steve Damon Coburn	8,612	0.64
Independent	Daniel Lewis	8,321	0.61
Write-in	Mark Pearson	15	0.00
Write-in	BeLinda Jo Ivins	14	0.00
Write-in	Darryl Haas	4	0.00

== Honours ==
- Order of the Rising Sun, 2nd Class, Gold and Silver Star (2025)

Political offices
Preceded by Victor Ashe	Mayor of Knoxville; 2003–2011	Succeeded by Daniel Brown; Acting
Preceded by Phil Bredesen	Governor of Tennessee; 2011–2019	Succeeded by Bill Lee
Party political offices
Preceded by Jim Bryson	Republican nominee for Governor of Tennessee; 2010, 2014	Succeeded by Bill Lee
Preceded by Chris Christie	Chair of the Republican Governors Association; 2014–2015	Succeeded by Susana Martinez
Preceded by Scott Walker	Chair of the Republican Governors Association; 2017–2018	Succeeded by Pete Ricketts
U.S. order of precedence (ceremonial)
Preceded by Phil Bredesen as Former Governor	Order of precedence of the United States; Within Tennessee	Succeeded by Jack Markell as Former Governor
Preceded by Phil Bredesen as Former Governor	Order of precedence of the United States; Outside Tennessee	Succeeded by Dick Celeste as Former Governor
Sporting positions
Preceded by David Freeman	Nashville Predators owner 2025–present	Incumbent
