= 1984 United States presidential election in Tennessee =

- November 6, 1984

Nominee	Ronald Reagan	Walter Mondale
Party	Republican	Democratic
Home state	California	Minnesota
Running mate	George H. W. Bush	Geraldine Ferraro
Electoral vote	11	0
Popular vote	990,212	711,714
Percentage	57.84%	41.57%

Reagan
40–50%
50–60%
60–70%
70–80%
Mondale
40–50%
50–60%
60–70%
President before election
Ronald Reagan
Republican
Elected President
Ronald Reagan
Republican

The 1984 United States presidential election in Tennessee took place on November 6, 1984. All 50 states and the District of Columbia, were part of the 1984 United States presidential election. Tennessee voters chose 11 electors to the Electoral College, which selected the president and vice president of the United States. Tennessee was won by incumbent United States President Ronald Reagan of California, who was running against former Vice President Walter Mondale of Minnesota. Reagan ran for a second time with incumbent Vice President George H. W. Bush of Texas, and Mondale ran with Representative Geraldine Ferraro of New York, the first major female candidate for the vice presidency. Mondale performed better in Tennessee than any other state that was part of the Confederacy.

Reagan carried every population center in the state. He narrowly won the state's two largest counties, typically Democratic Shelby (Memphis) and Davidson (Nashville), and got over 60% of the vote in typically Republican Knox (Knoxville) and Hamilton (Chattanooga) Counties. He also got over 60% in Rutherford County (Murfreesboro), and over 2/3 of the vote in the two largest counties in the Tri-Cities region, Sullivan and Washington. In addition, Reagan performed powerfully throughout rural East Tennessee, surpassing 70% of the vote in eight counties in the region (as well as in the emerging Nashville suburb of Williamson County), and carried most of the rural counties in more typically Democratic Middle and West Tennessee as well.

== Campaign ==
The Republican presidential nominee had won Tennessee in every presidential election since 1968 except for Democratic nominee Jimmy Carter's victory in 1976.

Among white voters, 65% supported Reagan while 34% supported Mondale. Despite Reagan's victory in the election, Democratic nominee Al Gore won in the concurrent senatorial election.

== Results ==
1984 United States presidential election in Tennessee
Party	Candidate	Votes	Percentage	Electoral votes
Republican	Ronald Reagan (incumbent)	990,212	57.84%	11
Democratic	Walter Mondale	711,714	41.57%	0
Independent	David Bergland	3,072	0.18%	0
Independent	Lyndon LaRouche	1,852	0.11%	0
Independent	Bob Richards	1,763	0.10%	0
Independent	Gus Hall	1,036	0.06%	0
Independent	Sonia Johnson	978	0.06%	0
Independent	Melvin Mason	715	0.04%	0
Independent	Dennis Serrette	524	0.03%	0
Write-Ins		127	0.01%	0
Totals		1,711,993	100.0%	11

=== Results by county ===
County	Ronald Reagan Republican		Walter Mondale Democratic		Various candidates Other parties		Margin		Total votes cast
County	#	%	#	%	#	%	#	%	Total votes cast
Anderson	16,783	61.31%	10,415	38.05%	176	0.64%	6,368	23.26%	27,374
Bedford	4,699	50.55%	4,499	48.40%	98	1.05%	200	2.15%	9,296
Benton	2,481	42.07%	3,398	57.62%	18	0.31%	-917	-15.55%	5,897
Bledsoe	1,950	59.34%	1,316	40.05%	20	0.61%	634	19.29%	3,286
Blount	20,525	68.74%	9,188	30.77%	146	0.49%	11,337	37.97%	29,859
Bradley	16,322	72.54%	6,085	27.04%	95	0.42%	10,237	45.50%	22,502
Campbell	5,685	54.43%	4,692	44.93%	67	0.64%	993	9.50%	10,444
Cannon	1,669	46.88%	1,846	51.85%	45	1.26%	-177	-4.97%	3,560
Carroll	6,017	56.43%	4,568	42.84%	77	0.72%	1,449	13.59%	10,662
Carter	13,153	73.35%	4,642	25.89%	138	0.77%	8,511	47.46%	17,933
Cheatham	4,109	57.32%	3,007	41.94%	53	0.74%	1,102	15.38%	7,169
Chester	2,793	59.68%	1,854	39.62%	33	0.71%	939	20.06%	4,680
Claiborne	4,474	60.70%	2,870	38.94%	27	0.37%	1,604	21.76%	7,371
Clay	1,338	50.80%	1,281	48.63%	15	0.57%	57	2.17%	2,634
Cocke	6,665	75.50%	2,068	23.43%	95	1.08%	4,597	52.07%	8,828
Coffee	7,695	57.14%	5,691	42.26%	82	0.61%	2,004	14.88%	13,468
Crockett	2,479	55.97%	1,937	43.73%	13	0.29%	542	12.24%	4,429
Cumberland	7,083	65.85%	3,605	33.52%	68	0.63%	3,478	32.33%	10,756
Davidson	98,155	51.99%	89,498	47.40%	1,161	0.61%	8,657	4.59%	188,814
Decatur	2,390	53.82%	2,031	45.73%	20	0.45%	359	8.09%	4,441
DeKalb	2,337	46.65%	2,645	52.79%	28	0.56%	-308	-6.14%	5,010
Dickson	5,846	49.52%	5,809	49.21%	150	1.27%	37	0.31%	11,805
Dyer	6,610	62.11%	3,991	37.50%	41	0.39%	2,619	24.61%	10,642
Fayette	3,733	50.44%	3,634	49.10%	34	0.46%	99	1.34%	7,401
Fentress	2,922	62.18%	1,755	37.35%	22	0.47%	1,167	24.83%	4,699
Franklin	5,705	49.09%	5,846	50.31%	70	0.60%	-141	-1.22%	11,621
Gibson	9,484	52.71%	8,334	46.32%	174	0.97%	1,150	6.39%	17,992
Giles	3,875	50.07%	3,812	49.26%	52	0.67%	63	0.81%	7,739
Grainger	3,212	66.72%	1,565	32.51%	37	0.77%	1,647	34.21%	4,814
Greene	13,215	73.15%	4,763	26.37%	87	0.48%	8,452	46.78%	18,065
Grundy	1,396	34.77%	2,596	64.66%	23	0.57%	-1,200	-29.89%	4,015
Hamblen	11,144	68.97%	4,922	30.46%	92	0.57%	6,222	38.51%	16,158
Hamilton	69,626	62.38%	41,449	37.13%	547	0.49%	28,177	25.25%	111,622
Hancock	1,491	69.87%	619	29.01%	24	1.12%	872	40.86%	2,134
Hardeman	3,712	48.68%	3,797	49.79%	117	1.53%	-85	-1.11%	7,626
Hardin	4,632	59.59%	3,051	39.25%	90	1.16%	1,581	20.34%	7,773
Hawkins	9,863	66.67%	4,802	32.46%	128	0.87%	5,061	34.21%	14,793
Haywood	2,839	46.04%	3,308	53.65%	19	0.31%	-469	-7.61%	6,166
Henderson	5,362	68.56%	2,426	31.02%	33	0.42%	2,936	37.54%	7,821
Henry	5,376	49.61%	5,407	49.89%	54	0.50%	-31	-0.28%	10,837
Hickman	2,370	44.43%	2,941	55.14%	23	0.43%	-571	-10.71%	5,334
Houston	882	33.68%	1,716	65.52%	21	0.80%	-834	-31.84%	2,619
Humphreys	2,249	37.91%	3,668	61.82%	16	0.27%	-1,419	-23.91%	5,933
Jackson	1,544	34.42%	2,894	64.51%	48	1.07%	-1,350	-30.09%	4,486
Jefferson	7,721	70.35%	3,185	29.02%	69	0.63%	4,536	41.33%	10,975
Johnson	3,853	79.10%	999	20.51%	19	0.39%	2,854	58.59%	4,871
Knox	76,965	63.61%	43,448	35.91%	574	0.47%	33,517	27.70%	120,987
Lake	878	41.97%	1,191	56.93%	23	1.10%	-313	-14.96%	2,092
Lauderdale	3,566	50.23%	3,506	49.39%	27	0.38%	60	0.84%	7,099
Lawrence	6,034	52.18%	5,458	47.20%	71	0.61%	576	4.98%	11,563
Lewis	1,733	52.42%	1,556	47.07%	17	0.51%	177	5.35%	3,306
Lincoln	3,982	49.08%	4,103	50.57%	29	0.36%	-121	-1.49%	8,114
Loudon	7,113	68.36%	3,227	31.01%	65	0.62%	3,886	37.35%	10,405
Macon	3,330	65.23%	1,747	34.22%	28	0.55%	1,583	31.01%	5,105
Madison	17,819	59.64%	12,006	40.18%	55	0.18%	5,813	19.46%	29,880
Marion	4,337	52.06%	3,942	47.32%	52	0.62%	395	4.74%	8,331
Marshall	3,416	53.43%	2,935	45.91%	42	0.66%	481	7.52%	6,393
Maury	9,008	56.18%	6,950	43.35%	75	0.47%	2,058	12.83%	16,033
McMinn	9,604	64.83%	5,141	34.71%	68	0.46%	4,463	30.12%	14,813
McNairy	4,776	55.34%	3,825	44.32%	30	0.35%	951	11.02%	8,631
Meigs	1,575	60.53%	1,012	38.89%	15	0.58%	563	21.64%	2,602
Monroe	6,665	60.88%	4,223	38.58%	59	0.54%	2,442	22.30%	10,947
Montgomery	13,228	56.61%	9,939	42.54%	198	0.85%	3,289	14.07%	23,365
Moore	863	51.37%	808	48.10%	9	0.54%	55	3.27%	1,680
Morgan	2,903	57.19%	2,121	41.78%	52	1.02%	782	15.41%	5,076
Obion	6,384	56.74%	4,769	42.38%	99	0.88%	1,615	14.36%	11,252
Overton	2,054	42.53%	2,749	56.92%	27	0.56%	-695	-14.39%	4,830
Perry	948	41.82%	1,316	58.05%	3	0.13%	-368	-16.23%	2,267
Pickett	1,246	63.67%	706	36.08%	5	0.26%	540	27.59%	1,957
Polk	2,785	56.15%	2,112	42.58%	63	1.27%	673	13.57%	4,960
Putnam	8,999	54.40%	7,443	45.00%	99	0.60%	1,556	9.40%	16,541
Rhea	5,692	66.29%	2,804	32.65%	91	1.06%	2,888	33.64%	8,587
Roane	11,882	63.83%	6,623	35.58%	109	0.59%	5,259	28.25%	18,614
Robertson	5,445	48.34%	5,756	51.11%	62	0.55%	-311	-2.77%	11,263
Rutherford	19,503	61.98%	11,618	36.92%	348	1.11%	7,885	25.06%	31,469
Scott	3,107	62.63%	1,810	36.48%	44	0.89%	1,297	26.15%	4,961
Sequatchie	1,785	58.68%	1,238	40.70%	19	0.62%	547	17.98%	3,042
Sevier	12,517	78.03%	3,384	21.10%	140	0.87%	9,133	56.93%	16,041
Shelby	169,717	50.32%	165,947	49.20%	1,638	0.49%	3,770	1.12%	337,302
Smith	2,393	42.05%	3,258	57.25%	40	0.70%	-865	-15.20%	5,691
Stewart	1,285	36.82%	2,174	62.29%	31	0.89%	-889	-25.47%	3,490
Sullivan	36,516	67.83%	16,925	31.44%	394	0.73%	19,591	36.39%	53,835
Sumner	18,442	61.09%	11,535	38.21%	209	0.69%	6,907	22.88%	30,186
Tipton	5,945	60.21%	3,895	39.45%	34	0.34%	2,050	20.76%	9,874
Trousdale	781	40.36%	1,142	59.02%	12	0.62%	-361	-18.66%	1,935
Unicoi	4,249	71.07%	1,696	28.37%	34	0.57%	2,553	42.70%	5,979
Union	2,447	61.51%	1,495	37.58%	36	0.90%	952	23.93%	3,978
Van Buren	718	46.78%	810	52.77%	7	0.46%	-92	-5.99%	1,535
Warren	4,811	49.64%	4,813	49.66%	67	0.69%	-2	-0.02%	9,691
Washington	21,762	69.38%	9,452	30.13%	154	0.49%	12,310	39.25%	31,368
Wayne	3,332	68.29%	1,534	31.44%	13	0.27%	1,798	36.85%	4,879
Weakley	6,480	57.41%	4,752	42.10%	55	0.49%	1,728	15.31%	11,287
White	2,895	48.59%	3,033	50.91%	30	0.50%	-138	-2.32%	5,958
Williamson	17,975	71.91%	6,929	27.72%	93	0.37%	11,046	44.19%	24,997
Wilson	12,858	59.95%	8,433	39.32%	158	0.74%	4,425	20.63%	21,449
Totals	990,212	57.84%	711,714	41.57%	10,067	0.59%	278,498	16.27%	1,711,993

==== Counties that flipped from Democratic to Republican ====
- Bedford
- Cheatham
- Clay
- Coffee
- Crockett
- Davidson
- Decatur
- Dickson
- Dyer
- Fayette
- Gibson
- Giles
- Lauderdale
- Lewis
- Marion
- Marshall
- Maury
- Montgomery
- Moore
- Obion
- Polk
- Putnam
- Rutherford
- Shelby
- Sumner
- Tipton
- Weakley
- Wilson

== See also ==
- 1984 United States Senate election in Tennessee
- 1984 United States House of Representatives elections in Tennessee
- United States presidential elections in Tennessee
- Presidency of Ronald Reagan

== Works cited ==
- Black, Earl; Black, Merle (1992). The Vital South: How Presidents Are Elected. Harvard University Press. ISBN 0674941306.
- Moreland, Laurence; Steed, Robert; Baker, Tod, eds. (1991). The 1988 Presidential Election in the South: Continuity Amidst Change in Southern Party Politics. Praeger Publishers. ISBN 0275931455.
