= Harold's =

Clothing store chain

- Industry: Retail
- Founded: 1948
- Founder: Harold G. Powell
- Defunct: 2008
- Fate: Bankruptcy; Liquidation
- Headquarters: Norman, Oklahoma (1948–2001); Dallas, Texas (2001–2008)
- Products: Men's and women's clothing
- Number of employees: 624 (prior to bankruptcy filing)

Harold's Stores, Inc. was a Norman, Oklahoma- and later Dallas-based chain of traditional, high-end classic styled ladies and men's specialty apparel stores. The chain operated 43 stores in 19 southern, western, and mid-western states in the United States. Prior to its bankruptcy filing, the company employed 624 people. The company was granted bankruptcy liquidation on November 10, 2008.

== History ==
Harold's was founded in 1948 in Norman, Oklahoma by Harold G. Powell. The buying offices were later moved to Dallas, Texas while distribution and operations were based out of Norman, Oklahoma. The chain operated high-end men's and women's clothing stores, usually located in upper-class areas and shopping centers in the southern, western, and mid-western parts of the United States, and targeted sales to customers between the ages of 30 and 50.

Originally selling only menswear, Harold's added women's apparel in 1958. The chain issued its own credit card in 1977, became a public company in 1987, and issued its first clothing catalog in 1990. In 1999 it had 53 stores in 22 states. At its peak, Harold's employed up to 1,800 people and its annual sales exceeded $150 million.

Harold's locations in Houston were known as "Harold Powell", the result of a 1992 gentlemen's agreement with Harold's Men's Wear founder Harold Wiesenthal, who had operated there since 1950. By 1996, however, Wiesenthal believed customer confusion had grown and filed a lawsuit blaming Powell's company. The two sides worked out a deal at the end of 1996, before the suit went to trial, with Powell agreeing to use a different cover on catalogs delivered to the Houston area, rather than just a sticker noting the differing store name.

=== Changes in leadership ===
Powell stepped down from leadership in May 1998 when his daughter, Rebecca Powell Casey, who joined the company in 1977 and was its CEO from 1992, became the company's board chairman. Casey had been president of the company from 1989 to 1992, preceded in that role by former Bonwit Teller president, Bernard H. Newburg. Clark Hinkley replaced Casey as Harold's CEO in February 2001, and in June 2001 the company stopped all of its catalog and Internet ordering activities, which had been losing money. After concentrating on their core business and accumulating seven consecutive months of store sales increases, Harold's reinstituted catalog sales in September 2003. Hugh Mullins, formerly of Neiman Marcus, became the CEO in February 2004 and resigned in August 2005. Hinkley then re-assumed the role as interim CEO. Casey, serving as executive vice president, left the company for personal reasons in January 2006, expressing in her resignation letter a lost faith in the company's leadership. Ronald S. Staffieri, who had been president of Michaels Stores, succeeded Hinkley as CEO in October 2006.

=== Decline and bankruptcy ===
By 2001, the company was under the control of preferred stockholders Howard Lester of Williams-Sonoma and Ronald de Waal, formerly of Saks. Company headquarters moved that year to Dallas, and Casey stepped down as CEO. Lester and de Waal loaned the company millions of dollars over the next several years to keep it running. Harold's had added new clothing styles to attract more youthful buyers, but alienated its core customers in the process. Hurricanes in 2005 added to heavy losses for stores in three southern states, and the company lost $6 million that year and $11 million in 2006, the year Harold's stock was delisted from the American Stock Exchange.

On November 10, 2008, Harold's Stores and six related companies were granted bankruptcy liquidation, stating, "Increased competition and a weak economy have left us no choice but to cease operations." The month before, it had hired consultants to look at alternatives, though only received interest from merchandise liquidators, of which it chose Gordon Brothers. The closure surprised some as the Chapter 11 filing is usually to allow for financial restructuring, and the chain had received a $1.8 billion loan in the prior quarter; the filing was converted to Chapter 7 in March 2009. Before bankruptcy, Harold's had 43 stores and 624 employees, about half of whom were part-time, across 19 states. Its assets (and liabilities) were listed as between $10 million and $50 million. Investors Lester and de Wall lost at least $15 million and $23.5 million, respectively.

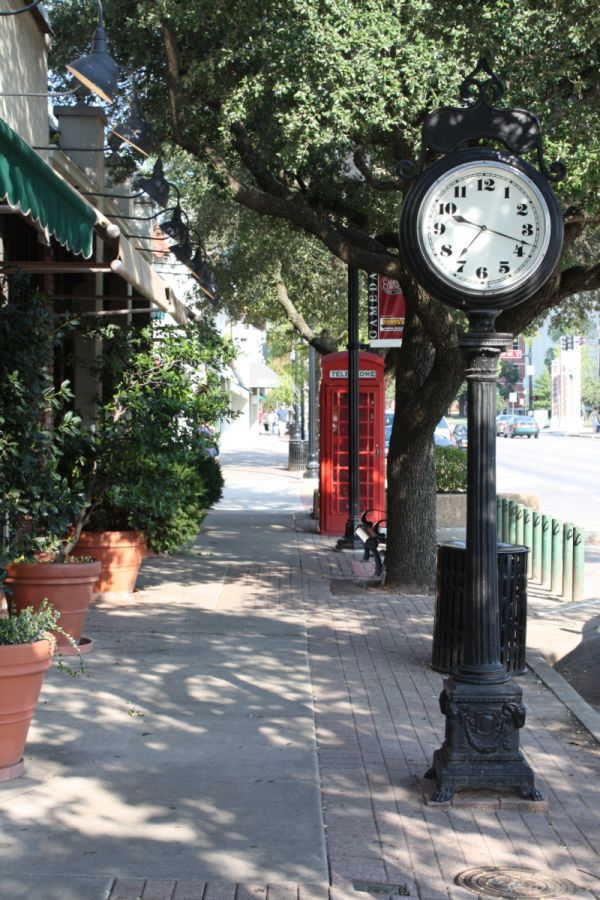
Sidewalk outside Harold's former flagship store in 2009 in Norman, Oklahoma

=== Aftermath ===
Two years before he became mayor of Knoxville, Tennessee, Bill Haslam of Saks Fifth Avenue was appointed in September 2001 as non-executive chairman of Harold's, a role he kept through the 2008 bankruptcy. In August 2009, the trustee of the bankruptcy filed a lawsuit against Haslam and the other directors and officers of Harold's, charging that the company had illegally paid nearly $6 million in dividends to preferred shareholders while in debt, and that Lester and de Waal's loans to the company were made in bad faith and without considering other options. Harold's leadership denied the claims and both sides ultimately settled out of court for $2 million in February 2014. Haslam said he was not influenced by de Waal and that he never had an operational role in the company, a claim also supported by Casey.

Powell had sold most of his stock in the company before it went bankrupt. A large antique carousel horse he bought and which was the basis for a longtime logo and mascot for Harold's, was still at Casey's vacation home in Texas as of September 2014. Cafe Plaid, a restaurant Powell had opened in 1996 next to the flagship store in Norman, was also still in business then, but with different ownership. In October 2010, the former flagship store in the city's Campus Corner district became an OU IT technology store run by University of Oklahoma's Information Technology department, with additional space made available for meetings. Powell died at the age of 92 in June 2016 from complications related to lung cancer.
