= Austin-East High School =

Austin-East Magnet High School

Location
- 2800 Martin Luther King Jr. Avenue; Knoxville, Tennessee 37914; 35°59′23″N 83°53′14″W

Information
- Established: 1879
- School district: Knox County Schools
- Grades: 9-12
- Enrollment: 663 (2024-2025)
- Color
- Mascot: Roadrunners

Austin-East High School, also known as Austin-East Magnet High School, is a public high school in Knoxville, Tennessee, operated by Knox County Schools.

The school includes a magnet school program in performing arts.

== History ==
Austin-East is the successor to two formerly racially segregated schools, the all-Black Austin High School and the all-white East High School. The two schools were combined in 1968 to form the integrated Austin East High School, housed in the East High School building.

=== Austin High School ===
Austin High School opened in 1879. It was named for Emily Austin, a white woman from Philadelphia, Pennsylvania, who raised money to establish the school as Knoxville's first Black high school. She had arrived in Knoxville in 1870 with the goal of helping to educate African American children, who at the time were schooled in church basements, lodge halls, and one-room schoolhouses scattered throughout the area. For eight years she worked as a grade school teacher in Black schools in Knoxville, then she returned to the North to seek donations for establishment of a high school for Black students. She succeeded in raising $6,500, which was matched by $2,000 from the Knoxville Board of Education to start Austin High School.

Edenton, North Carolina, native John W. Manning became school principal in 1881, the first Black person to hold that position. An 1881 graduate of Yale University, Manning remained as principal until retiring in 1912. He was succeeded as principal by Charles W. Cansler, who had been teaching at Austin since 1900.

In 1916, Austin High School left its initial location on Central Street in Knoxville to move to a new building on Payne Avenue. At the Payne Avenue location, the school was renamed Knoxville Colored High School. By 1928, that school building had become overcrowded due to a growing African American population, and the school moved to a new location on Vine Street, once again using the Austin High School name. William A. Robinson became school principal in 1928. Robinson served for just two years before moving to Atlanta and being succeeded as principal by Thomas R. Davis. Davis was principal until his death in 1948, when Dean of Girls Fannie C. Clay assumed the position of acting principal until the appointment of Otis T. Hogue as principal in the fall of 1949. In 1952 Austin moved to a new modern building one block from its previous location, remaining there until its merger with East High School.

=== East High School ===
East High School was one of four schools, the others being West, South (now South-Doyle), and Fulton, that opened in 1951 following the split-up of old Knoxville High. Initially an all-white school, East began to enroll Black students in the early 1960s as the Knoxville city schools underwent a slow process of racial integration. The school graduated a total of 17 classes before its merger with Austin High School in 1968. Its sports teams were called the "Mountaineers."

=== Merger ===
In 1968 the two schools, which were only some eight to ten blocks apart, were combined to form a single racially integrated high school located in the East High building and named Austin East High School. The Austin school site became the location of Vine Middle School. Following the merger, many white students from East High transferred to other high schools, leaving Austin-East as a predominantly Black school.

In 1987, authority for the school shifted from the city of Knoxville to Knox County when the city school system was consolidated into Knox County Schools.

In 1997, the school received magnet school designation, offering a focus in performing arts, science and math. In spite of the magnet program, which was intended to boost white enrollment, as of 2008-2009 more than 80% of Austin-East's students were Black. After several years of failing to meet performance benchmarks set under the No Child Left Behind Act, in 2008-2009 the school was reorganized into small learning communities.

=== April 2021 shooting ===
On April 12, 2021, at around 3:15 pm EDT, a shooting occurred at the Austin-East High School. A 17-year-old Black student, Anthony Thompson Jr., was shot and killed by the police during an armed struggle in the school's bathroom as the police were responding to a domestic violence call involving Thompson. Another police officer was wounded by a friendly fire shot, that the Tennessee Bureau of Investigation originally incorrectly blamed on Thompson.

After a controversy surrounding the police body camera footage in the case, the DA Charme Allen released the footage and other video evidence on April 21, 2021, and announced that no officers involved in the incident would face any charges. The event resulted in ongoing racial justice protests in the community as well as outside of Tennessee. The students have been staging daily walkouts at 3:15 p.m. to mark the approximate time of Thompson's death and demand police reform. Anthony Thompson's family is represented by Ben Crump, a prominent national civil rights lawyer representing the families of George Floyd, Breonna Taylor and Daunte Wright.

The mother of Thompson's girlfriend expressed regret for calling the police regarding Thompson's fight with her daughter in the events before the shooting. The Knoxville Police Department was investigating a possible retaliatory arson at her home on April 25.

Following several weeks of protests and controversy about the role of uniformed police officers at schools after Thompson's death, Knoxville's mayor Indya Kincannon announced that at the end of the school year on June 12, 2021, the Knoxville Police Department would withdraw its uniformed officers stationed at Knox County schools.

On May 14, the DA announced that a local man, Kelvon Foster, 21, had been charged in state court with illegally providing a gun to Anthony Thompson. The prosecutors allege that Foster bought the 9mm Glock on April 12 for Thompson at a local gun and pawn shop, with Thompson present for the transaction with two other men, as shown by the store's video footage. Foster was concurrently charged in federal court with making a straw purchase of the gun for Thompson.

== Magnet program ==
The Austin-East magnet program in performing arts operates as a "school-within-a-school." Specialized offerings include dance, theater, vocal and instrumental music, and finance and business.

== Sports ==
Austin-East fields interscholastic teams in football, soccer, basketball, baseball, softball, cross country, track and field, marching band, wrestling, volleyball. The Tennessee Secondary School Athletic Association (TSSAA) classifies the school's football team in Class 3A Its sports teams are nicknamed "Roadrunners." The boys' basketball team won the state championship in 1977 (AAA), 1985(AA), and 1987 (AA). The football team won the Class 2A state championship in 1983, 1986, and the Class 3A state championship in 2001. In 2007, Austin-East won the state championship in Class AA girls' basketball. The boys track team won state championships in 1981(AAA) and 1987(A/AA). The girls track team won the A/AA championship in 1986, 1987, 1988, and 2007.

== Notable alumni ==
- Bianca Belair, WWE professional wrestler and former track and field athlete at the University of Tennessee
- Daniel Brown, the first Black person to serve as mayor of Knoxville
- Joey Clinkscales, NFL player and executive (attended in the late 1970s and early 1980s)
- Beauford Delaney and Joseph Delaney, artists (attended in the 1910s)
- Joe Fishback, former NFL player, two-time Super Bowl Champion (1987 graduate)
- Nikki Giovanni, poet (attended 1958–1960)
- Paul Hogue, basketball player, two-time NCAA champion with Cincinnati, first-round pick in 1962 NBA draft
- Raleigh McKenzie, former NFL player, two-time Super Bowl champion
- Reggie McKenzie, NFL player and executive, valedictorian for the Austin-East Class of 1981, two-time Super Bowl champion (1981 graduate)
- Sam McKenzie, member of the Tennessee House of Representatives
- Leroy Thompson, former NFL athlete, All-American football player who led Austin-East to a football, basketball, and track state championship his senior year (1987 graduate)
- Carl Torbush, football coach, attended East High School and remained at Austin-East after the merger for his senior year, graduating in the merged school's first class. He played several sports in high school and was the first Austin-East football player to receive all-state recognition. Torbush recalls being the only white student on some of his senior-year sports teams.
- Elston Turner, NBA player and coach, played on the school's 1977 state championship basketball team (1977 graduate)
