= Joe Fishback =

American football player (born 1967)

No. 29, 36, 46
- Position: Safety

Personal information
- Born: November 29, 1967 (age 58); Knoxville, Tennessee, U.S.
- Listed height: 6 ft 0 in (1.83 m)
- Listed weight: 212 lb (96 kg)

Career information
- High school: Austin-East (TN)
- College: Carson-Newman
- NFL draft: 1990: undrafted

Career history
- New York Giants (1990); Atlanta Falcons (1991); New York Jets (1992); Atlanta Falcons (1992–1993); Dallas Cowboys (1993–1994); Denver Broncos (1995)*
- * Offseason or practice squad member only

Awards and highlights
- Super Bowl champion (XXVIII); NAIA All-American (1989); SAC Defensive Player of the Year (1989); First-team All-SAC (1989); Second-team All-SAC (1988)

Career NFL statistics
- Games played: 45
- Stats at Pro Football Reference

Joe Fishback (born November 29, 1967) is an American former professional football player who was a safety in the National Football League (NFL) for the Atlanta Falcons, New York Jets, and Dallas Cowboys. He played college football for the Carson–Newman Eagles.

== Early life ==
Fishback was born in Knoxville, Tennessee and attended Austin-East High School, where he earned All-state honors in both football and baseball. He initially played out of position as an undersized (160 pounds) offensive guard. On the defensive side he played at linebacker and defensive end.

He initially accepted a football scholarship from Johnson C. Smith University, but opted to leave after a week, when he came to a decision that the football program wasn't what he expected. He would end up transferring to Carson-Newman University, where he was converted into a strong safety, even though he never played the position before. He was named a starter mid-way through his freshman season.

As a senior, he was the runner up in the NAIA's Player of the Year voting and was named Conference "Defensive Player of the Year". He took part in 4 consecutive NAIA Division I championship games from 1986 to 1989, winning the title in 1986, 1988 and 1989. He finished his college career with 293 tackles, 11 interceptions (3 returned for touchdowns) and a 21.6-yard average on 7 punt returns (2 returned for touchdowns).

In 2013, he was inducted into the Carson-Newman Athletic Hall of Fame. In 2016, he was inducted into the Knoxville Sports Hall of Fame.

== Professional career ==
=== New York Giants ===
Fishback was signed as an undrafted free agent by the New York Giants after the 1990 NFL draft. He injured his back in the third preseason game and was placed on the injured reserve list, with a transverse process fracture on August 27. He was released in November.

=== Atlanta Falcons (first stint) ===
On September 4, 1991, the Atlanta Falcons signed him to their practice squad. He was promoted to the active roster on November 16. He played in 14 games as a reserve defensive back, posting 5 defensive tackles, 24 special teams tackles (led the team), partially blocked a punt, returned a fumble for a touchdown and returned 3 kickoffs for 29 yards. He was named the Falcons "Special Teams Player of the Week" 6 times. He was selected as a Pro Bowl alternate at the end of the season.

In the NFC Wild Card playoff game against the New Orleans Saints, with the score 27-20 and less than 2 minutes left in the fourth quarter, the Falcons cornerback Tim McKyer intercepted a pass that sealed the victory, but instead of falling down, he chose to make a risky lateral pass to teammate Deion Sanders, who after a sizeable run, made another dangerous lateral pass to Fishback, who returned the ball for an apparent touchdown, that would be overruled when proven that Sanders had done an illegal forward lateral, thus the play ended as a footnote.

=== New York Jets ===
On March 13, 1992, he signed in Plan B free agency with the New York Jets. He appeared in the first five games, collecting 4 special teams tackles. He was cut on October 20.

=== Atlanta Falcons (second stint) ===
On November 3, 1992, he signed as a free agent with the Atlanta Falcons. He appeared in the final 7 games, making 7 defensive tackles and 8 special teams tackles. On August 23, 1993, he was placed on the injured reserve list with a sprained neck. He was released on October 4.

=== Dallas Cowboys ===
On October 13, 1993, he signed as a free agent with the Dallas Cowboys. He played mainly on special teams and registered 12 special teams tackles (tied for sixth on the team). He suffered a sprained right knee in the tenth game against the Phoenix Cardinals and was declared inactive for the next 5 contests. He was a part of the Super Bowl XXVIII Championship team. In 1994, he registered 17 special teams tackles (sixth on the team). He was released on November 30.

=== Denver Broncos ===
In 1995, he was signed as a free agent by the Denver Broncos. He was released on August 22.
