= Madeline Rogero =

American politician and 68th mayor of Knoxville, Tennessee

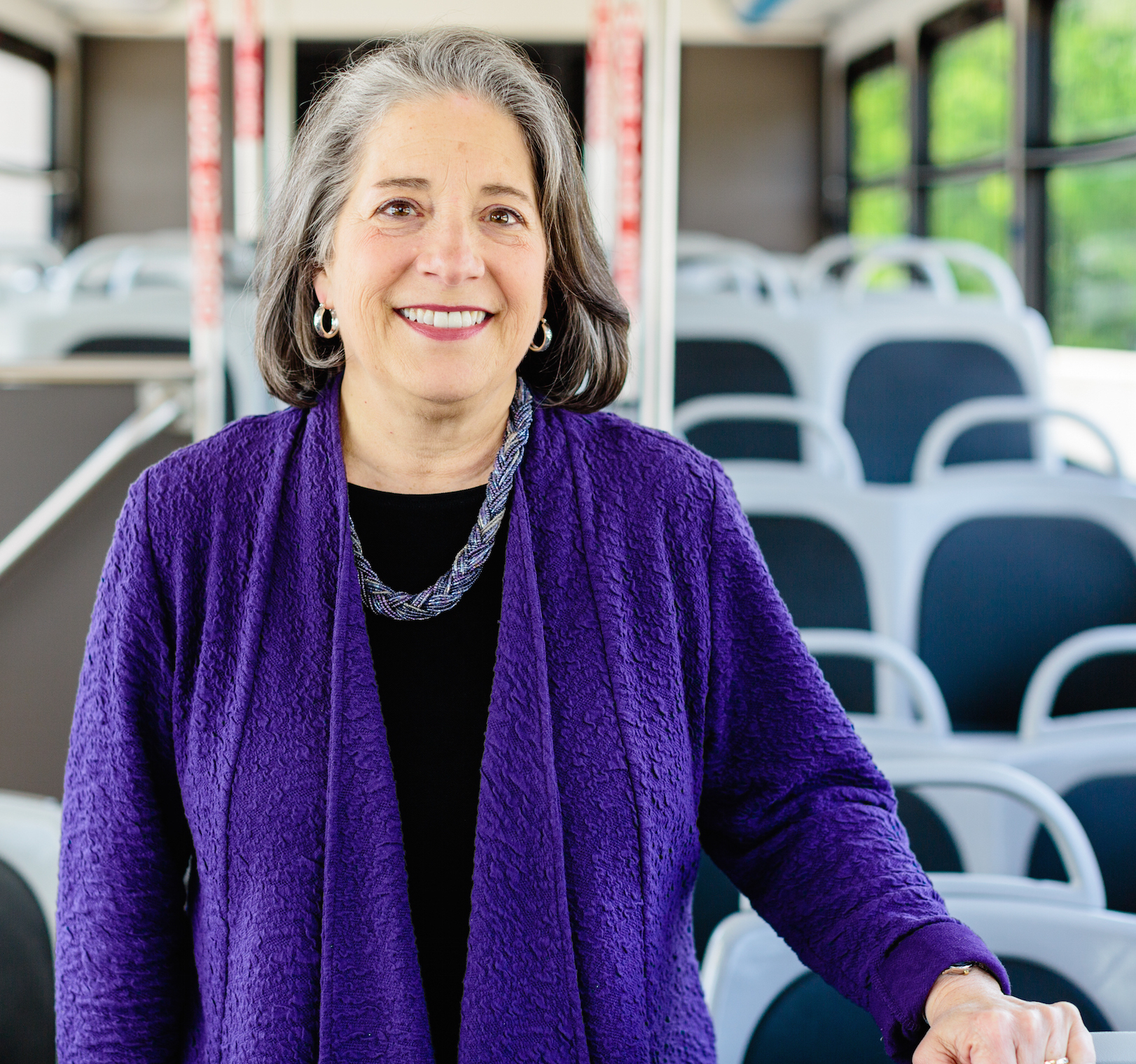

68th Mayor of Knoxville
- In office December 17, 2011 – December 21, 2019
- Preceded by: Bill Haslam
- Succeeded by: Indya Kincannon

Knox County Commission
- In office 1990–1998
- Preceded by: Jesse Cawood

Personal details
- Born: Madeline Anne Regero; July 26, 1952 (age 74) Jacksonville, Florida, U.S.
- Party: Democratic
- Spouse(s): Mark Pitt (divorced 1983) Gene Monaco (m. 2001)
- Education: Furman University; University of Tennessee

Madeline Anne Rogero (/roʊhɛəroʊ/) (born July 26, 1952) is an American politician who served as the 68th mayor of Knoxville, Tennessee, elected in 2011. She was the first woman to hold the office. Before entering politics, Rogero worked as a community development director, non-profit executive, urban and regional planner, and community volunteer. She served on the Knox County Commission from 1990 to 1998, and first ran for mayor in 2003, losing to the later Governor of Tennessee, Bill Haslam. While Knoxville municipal elections are officially nonpartisan, Rogero is known to be a Democrat.

== Early life ==
Madeline Rogero was born in Jacksonville, Florida, one of three children of Gerald Rogero, a plumber, and Anita Ghioto, a former nun. She spent her childhood in Eau Gallie, Florida, and later in Kettering, Ohio, where she attended Archbishop Alter High School. Rogero attended Temple University and Ohio State University, before graduating with a degree in political science from Furman University in 1979.

During the mid-1970s, Rogero and her first husband, Mark Pitt, worked as organizers for César Chávez's United Farm Workers, a labor union that sought better wages for migrant farm workers. She and Pitt moved to Knoxville in 1980, where Pitt helped run the textile workers' union, Amalgamated Clothing & Textile Workers, now UNITE HERE. Rogero obtained a master's degree from the University of Tennessee's Graduate School of Planning, having been inspired to enter the urban planning field while helping fight an attempt by a developer to install temporary trailers in her neighborhood in anticipation of the 1982 World's Fair.

== Knox County Commission ==
In 1990, Rogero successfully ran for the 2nd District Knox County Commission seat, defeating 24-year incumbent Jesse Cawood. She was reelected in 1994. Following her second term, she chose not to run again after a term-limits referendum was passed by voters in 1994. Though the referendum was not enforced until 2007, Rogero returned to non-profit work and community development, namely as head of Dolly Parton's Dollywood Foundation and then as executive director of Knoxville's Promise, a branch of Colin Powell's America's Promise.

== 2003 mayoral campaign ==
In 2003, Rogero ran for mayor of Knoxville, Tennessee, competing with businessman Bill Haslam for the position being vacated by long-time Knoxville mayor Victor Ashe. Her plan for the city involved four key components:

1. Bring higher-paying jobs to the city, accusing many of the city's business leaders of keeping higher-paying jobs out of town for fear that this would lead to increased pay expectations in their own businesses.
2. Strengthen neighborhoods and work with neighborhood organizations.
3. Revitalize the Downtown area, namely with a better retail strategy for Gay Street and Market Square, and the creation of more parking areas.
4. Address quality of life issues, namely greenways, arts, and historic preservation, and link them to economic growth.

By June 2003, Rogero had raised $72,000 in contributions, far short of the $467,000 Haslam had raised, though she eventually amassed over $160,000 (about one-fourth of Haslam's eventual total). As the campaign heated up, Rogero attacked Haslam on several fronts, attempting to paint him as a representative of oil interests (Haslam's father, Jim Haslam, is the founder and chairman of Pilot Corporation), and arguing he would be a puppet of developers that have "gone up against many of our neighborhood organizations." Haslam was generally considered an "establishment" candidate, but ran a grassroots-style campaign in an attempt to connect with all of the city's neighborhoods, and won the support of numerous black leaders in East Knoxville.

While Haslam won the election with about 53% of the vote, Rogero garnered praise for running an effective campaign and energizing the city's urban and working class voters. In 2006, Haslam appointed Rogero director of community development, a move inspired in part by the Doris Kearns Goodwin book, Team of Rivals.

== 2011 mayoral campaign ==
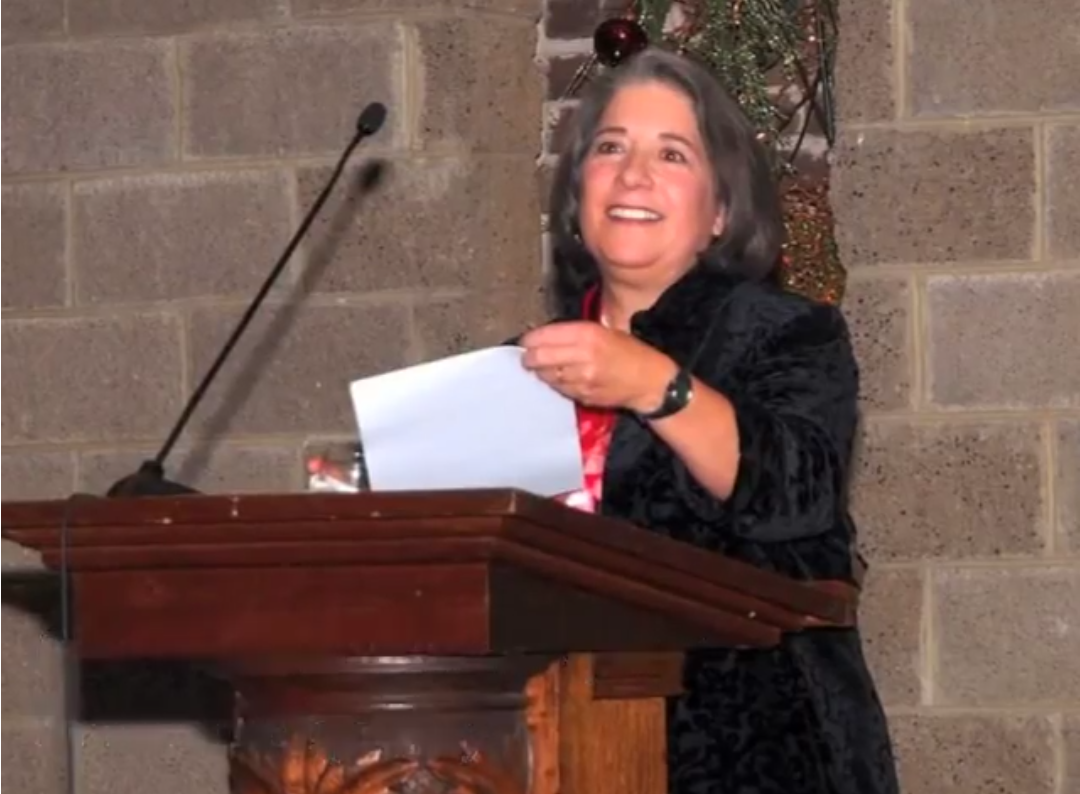
Rogero delivering a speech during her 2011 mayoral campaign

Haslam was reelected mayor in 2007 (Rogero didn't run), and resigned the office in January 2011 after he was elected governor of the state. Councilman Daniel Brown was appointed interim mayor. Rogero announced her candidacy for mayor in August 2010, joining a field that eventually included councilwoman Marilyn Roddy, former councilman Ivan Harmon, businessman Mark Padgett, former councilman Joe Hultquist, and local 911 operator Bo Bennett. Roddy dropped out in April 2011 to run for the district's state senate seat, leaving Rogero as the front runner in the nonpartisan mayoral election.

By July 2011, Rogero had managed to raise $160,000, and by September she had raised over $345,000. Her candidacy was endorsed by the Knoxville News Sentinel, Knoxville's daily newspaper; the alternative weekly Metro Pulse; the Public Trust PAC, a nonpartisan political action committee in Knox County that was established after a series of 2007 scandals involving county government; former State Senator Ben Atchley; former Knox County Executive Tommy Schumpert; several key members of the city staff under former mayor Haslam; and the Knoxville Firefighters Association. By the day of the primary election, she counted a total of "more than two dozen" endorsements from current or past elected officials in the Knoxville and Knox County governments.

In the primary election on September 27, 2011 Rogero won 49.91% of the vote, ahead of the second and third-place finishers, Mark Padgett (22.64%) and Ivan Harmon (22.32%), but 16 votes short of the 50% threshold needed to avoid a runoff.

Rogero faced fellow Democrat Padgett, the second-place finisher, in a runoff election that was held on November 8, 2011. During the weeks following the primary, Rogero picked up an endorsement from the local chapter of the Fraternal Order of Police, while Padgett was endorsed by all three of the other men who had been candidates in the primary; Jimmy "J.J." Jones, the Knox County Sheriff; the Knoxville Area Association of Realtors; and the Home Builders Association of Greater Knoxville. Rogero won the runoff with 58.6% of the vote. Rogero's election made her the first woman mayor of Knoxville. She also became the first woman mayor of any of Tennessee's Big Four cities.

== Mayoral term ==
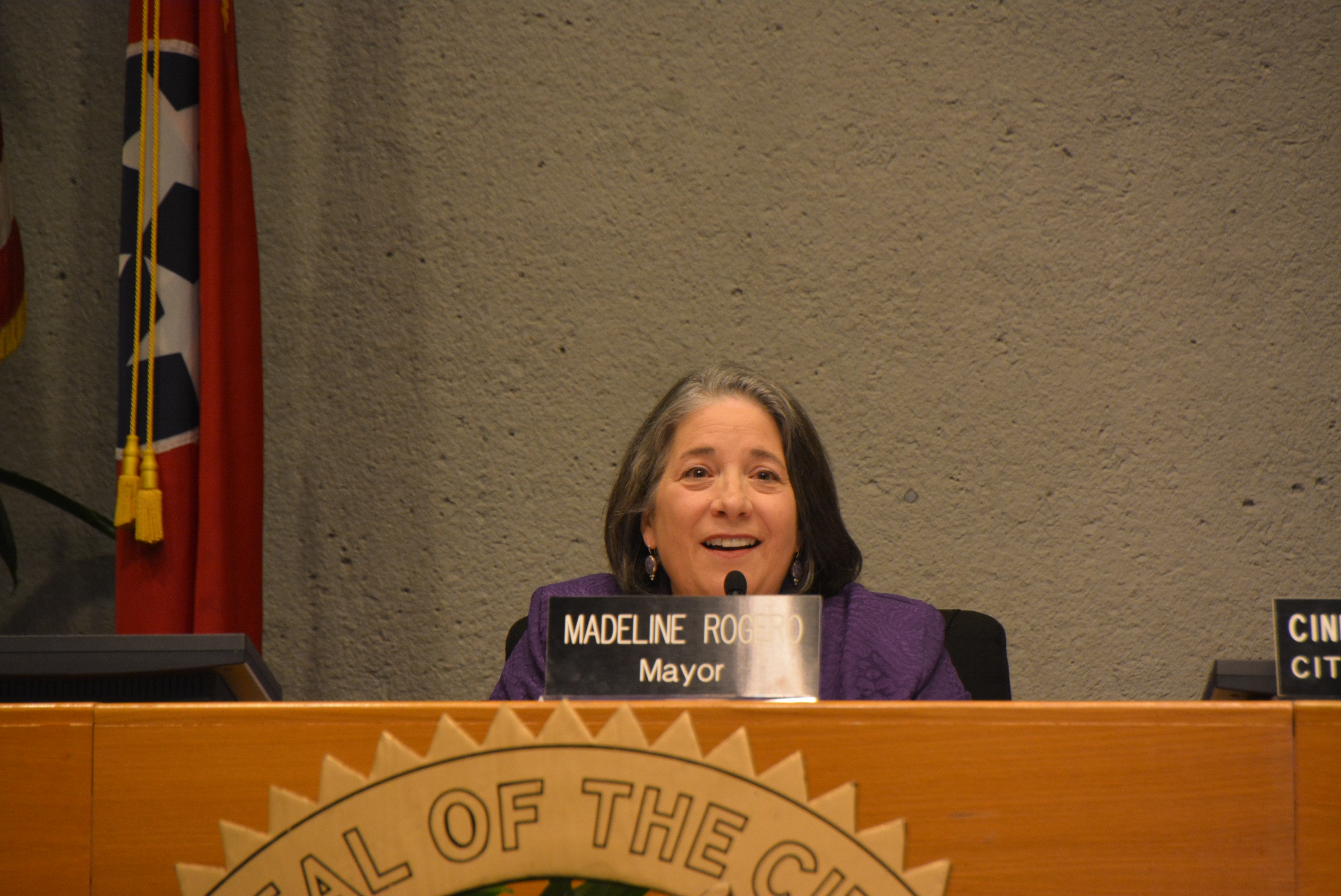
Mayor Rogero presiding over a City Council meeting, 2014

Rogero was sworn in as mayor on December 17, 2011, in a ceremony at Chilhowee Park. In her first year in office, she proposed the creation of a new hybrid pension plan because the existing plan was deemed unsustainable. The Knoxville City Council voted to put the new hybrid plan on the November 2012 ballot and voters approved it with 76 percent voting in favor. The new plan does not interfere with benefits of existing employees but does impact all city employees hired after Jan. 1, 2013.

Her administration also saw the development of the Office of Business Support, which was designed to help local businesses in their dealings with the City of Knoxville government, and the development of new enforcement tools to deal with chronically neglected and blighted properties. City Council approved four ordinances to help address the issue. Rogero included both initiatives in a Year-End Review that looked at her first year in office.

On November 1, 2013, Rogero was selected as one of 26 governmental leaders to serve on a task force that advised former President Barack Obama on climate preparedness and resilience-building efforts. In late January 2014, Rogero visited Turkey at the invitation of the U.S. State Department to talk about the importance of women participating in politics and public life.

In 2015, Rogero was reelected with 98.78%, facing only a single write-in opponent.

== Political positions ==
Rogero's administration has a four-level platform: Strong, safe neighborhoods; Living Green and Working Green; An energized downtown; and Job creation and retention. Her first budget included initiatives in each of these areas.

During her 2011 campaign, Rogero stated she would only consider raising taxes after "all attempts were exhausted to cut expenses to provide needed services."

She also expressed her support for the proposed Hillside and Ridgetop Protection Plan, which would place restrictions on development along the slopes of area hills and ridges. Supporters of the plan had said it was necessary to preserve the area's scenic beauty and protect neighborhoods and waterways from runoff. Opponents argued that it was too restrictive, and would harm area economic development.
