= Plug-in electric vehicles in Tennessee =

As of 2022, there were about 18,500 electric vehicles in Tennessee.

== Registration fee ==
As of 2022, the state government charges a $100 registration fee for electric vehicles.

== Charging stations ==
As of August 2021, there were 23 DC charging stations in Tennessee.

The Infrastructure Investment and Jobs Act, signed into law in November 2021, allocates US$88 million to charging stations in Tennessee.

== Manufacturing ==
Tennessee is widely considered to be a potential national hub for electric vehicle manufacturing.
