= Daniel Brown (politician) =

American Tennessee politician

81st Mayor of Knoxville Acting
- In office January 10, 2011 – December 17, 2011
- Preceded by: Bill Haslam
- Succeeded by: Madeline Rogero

Knoxville City Councilman for the Sixth District
- In office December 19, 2009 – December 20, 2017

Personal details
- Born: Daniel Brown; December 25, 1945 (age 80) Knoxville, Tennessee, U.S.
- Spouse: Cathy Smith
- Children: 1 daughter
- Education: Austin High School; Tennessee State University

Daniel Brown (born December 25, 1945) is a former city councilman and former acting mayor of the city of Knoxville, Tennessee, where he was the first African American to serve as mayor.

Brown was born in Knoxville, where he graduated from Austin High School. He attended Tennessee State University, where he received B.S. degree in history. Brown is a Vietnam War veteran and a retiree of the U.S. Postal Service.

He was selected by the council to serve as mayor after Bill Haslam resigned from office in order to pursue his eventually successful campaign for governor, making Brown the first African American mayor of the city. He did not run for a full term as mayor, but remained on the city council. He was succeeded by Madeline Rogero.

== See also ==
- List of first African-American mayors
