= 1984 United States Senate election in Tennessee =

- November 6, 1984
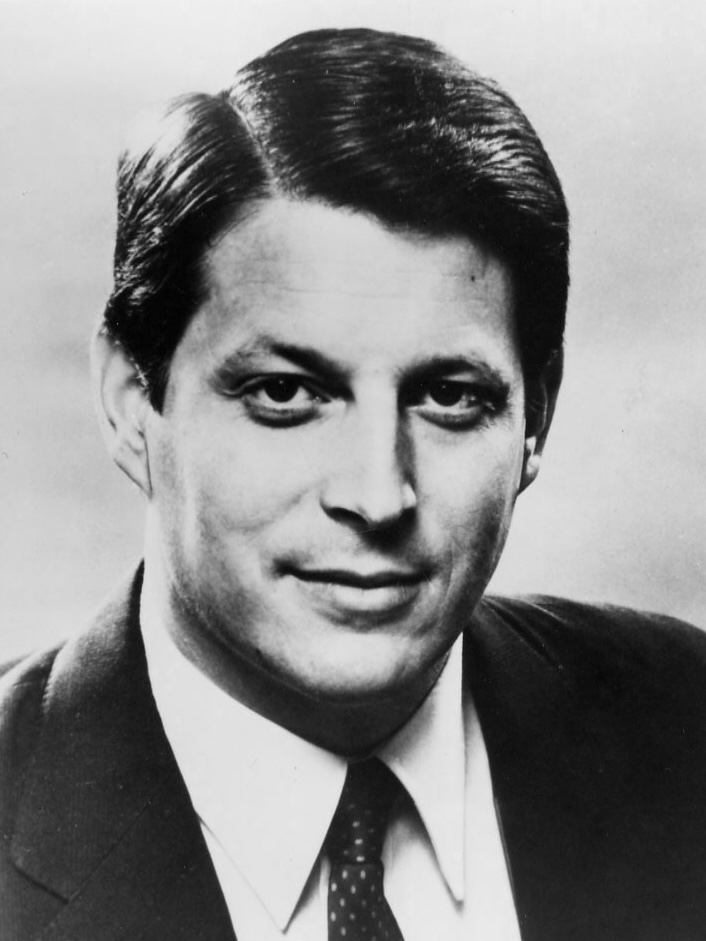

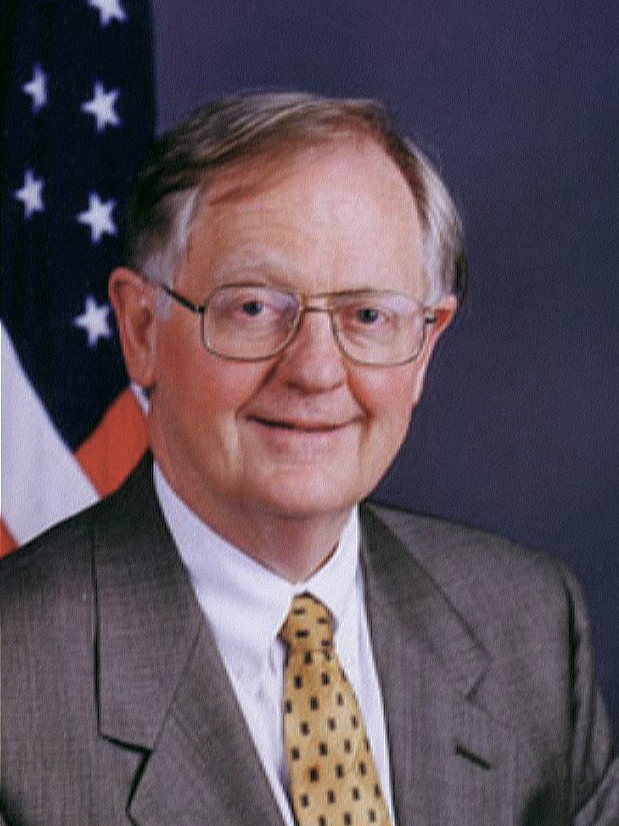

Nominee	Al Gore	Victor Ashe	Ed McAteer
Party	Democratic	Republican	Independent
Popular vote	1,000,607	557,016	87,234
Percentage	60.72%	33.80%	5.29%
- County results Gore: 50–60% 60–70% 70–80% 80–90% Ashe: 50–60% 60–70% 70–80%
U.S. senator before election
Howard Baker
Republican
Elected U.S. Senator
Al Gore
Democratic

The 1984 United States Senate election in Tennessee took place on November 6, 1984, to select the U.S. Senator from the state of Tennessee. Popular three-term Republican incumbent Howard Baker, who had served as United States Senate Majority Leader since 1981 (Minority Leader from 1977 to 1981) decided not to seek re-election in order to concentrate on a planned bid for the 1988 Republican presidential nomination (which did not happen, as he later accepted a White House Chief of Staff position under President Ronald Reagan). This left the seat open.

In the general election, Democratic candidate Al Gore, son of former senator Albert Gore Sr., won easily, flipping the Republican held seat to Democratic hands.

== Democratic Primary ==
Democrats nominated Representative and future Vice President Al Gore, whose father, Albert Gore Sr., had once held Tennessee's other Senate seat.

=== Results ===
Democratic primary results
Party	Candidate	Votes	%
Democratic	Al Gore	476,582	100.00%
Total votes		476,582	100.00%

== Republican primary ==
=== Candidates ===
- State Senator Victor Ashe
- Jack McNeil
- Hubert David Patty

=== Results ===
In the primary, held on August 2, Ashe easily emerged as a winner.

Republican primary results
Party	Candidate	Votes	%
Republican	Victor Ashe	145,744	86.47%
Republican	Jack McNeil	17,970	10.66%
Republican	Herbert David Patty	4,777	2.83%
Republican	Write-in	49	0.03%
Total votes		168,540	100%

== General election ==
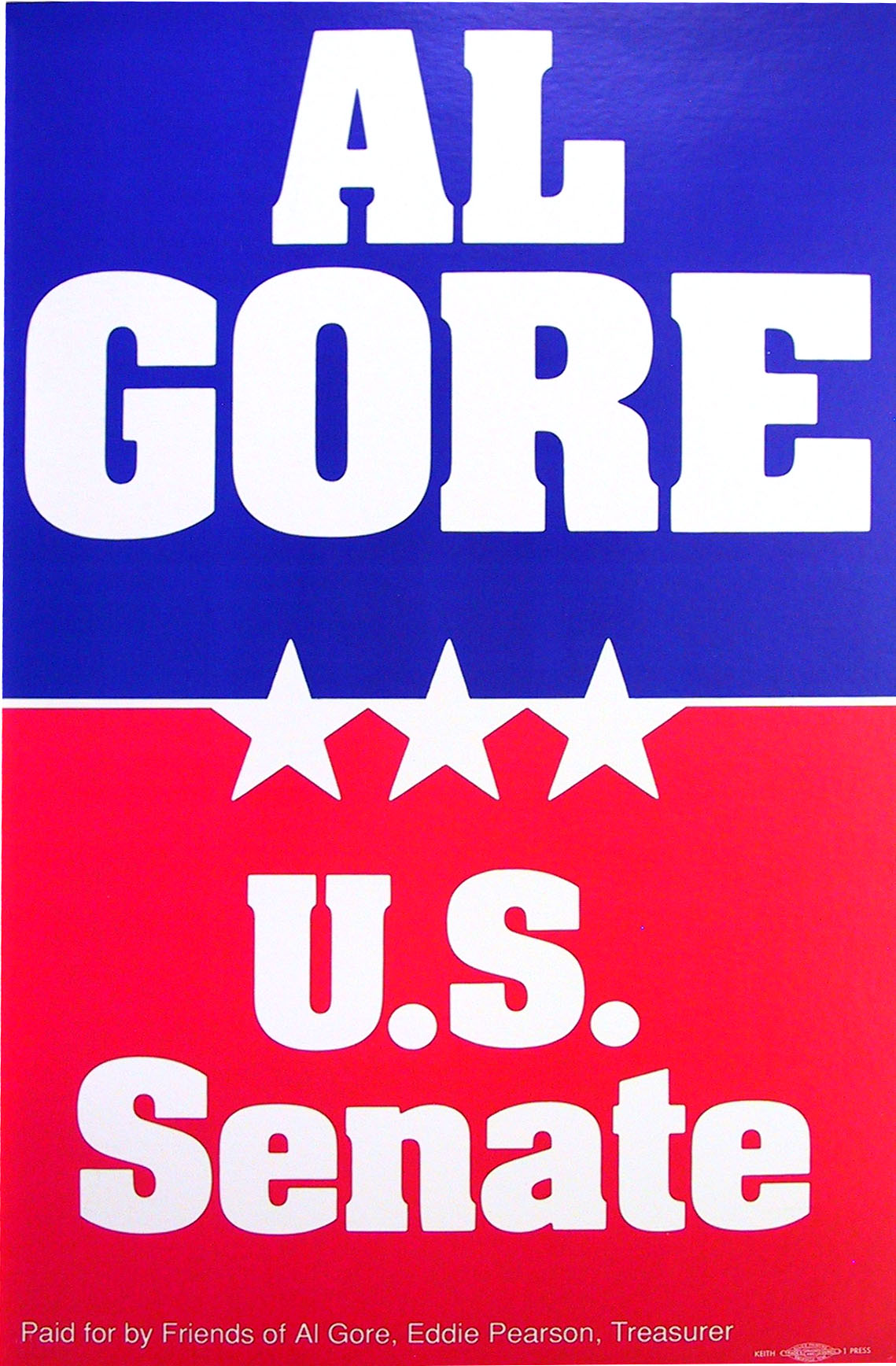
Al Gore 1984 campaign poster

Although the Senate election coincided with the landslide re-election of President Reagan, who carried Tennessee by a wide margin, this time his victory did not have any coattails, as it did in 1980, and Democrats picked up three Republican seats. One of the Democratic gains was in Tennessee, where conservative Democrat Gore won in a landslide:

General election results
Party	Candidate	Votes	%
Democratic	Al Gore	1,000,607	60.72%
Republican	Victor Ashe	557,016	33.80%
Independent	Ed McAteer	87,234	5.29%
Independent	Khalil-Ullah Al-Muhaymin	3,179	0.19%
Total votes		1,648,036	100.00%
Democratic gain from Republican			

=== By county ===
County	Albert Gore, Jr. Democratic		Victor Ashe Republican		Others Independent		Margin	Total votes
County	%	#	%	#	%	#	Margin	Total votes
Anderson	61.0%	15,971	35.7%	9,348	3.2%	846	6,623	26,165
Bedford	79.4%	7,075	19.1%	1,702	1.5%	135	5,373	8,912
Benton	77.4%	4,573	20.6%	1,214	2.0%	120	3,359	5,907
Bledsoe	51.3%	1,749	45.5%	1,554	3.2%	109	195	3,412
Blount	46.5%	13,431	45.2%	13,068	8.3%	2,409	363	28,908
Bradley	41.9%	9,444	53.6%	12,086	4.6%	1,035	-2,642	22,565
Campbell	59.1%	5,827	39.4%	3,887	1.5%	150	1,940	9,864
Cannon	80.7%	2,825	17.9%	627	1.4%	48	2,198	3,500
Carroll	63.5%	6,520	34.1%	3,504	2.4%	250	3,016	10,274
Carter	42.5%	6,906	49.2%	8,002	8.3%	1,347	-1,096	16,255
Cheatham	71.9%	5,071	24.2%	1,708	3.9%	274	3,363	7,053
Chester	58.9%	2,643	35.8%	1,605	5.3%	237	1,038	4,485
Claiborne	53.0%	3,662	45.6%	3,145	1.4%	97	517	6,904
Clay	69.5%	1,795	30.1%	778	0.3%	8	1,017	2,581
Cocke	38.0%	3,113	59.2%	4,848	2.8%	231	-1,735	8,192
Coffee	72.1%	9,522	25.9%	3,416	2.1%	274	6,106	13,212
Crockett	63.2%	2,772	31.0%	1,360	5.7%	251	1,412	4,383
Cumberland	54.5%	5,793	43.2%	4,594	2.3%	248	1,199	10,635
Davidson	72.7%	132,696	23.7%	43,309	3.6%	6,497	89,387	182,502
Decatur	65.8%	2,786	29.4%	1,243	4.8%	204	1,543	4,233
DeKalb	80.6%	3,922	18.7%	909	0.8%	38	3,013	4,869
Dickson	76.6%	8,668	20.9%	2,369	2.5%	283	6,299	11,320
Dyer	59.6%	6,166	35.8%	3,702	4.7%	483	2,464	10,351
Fayette	62.1%	4,577	32.1%	2,364	5.8%	426	2,213	7,367
Fentress	61.3%	2,791	37.9%	1,725	0.7%	34	1,066	4,550
Franklin	76.9%	8,534	21.8%	2,419	1.4%	151	6,115	11,104
Gibson	69.3%	11,729	27.1%	4,579	3.7%	618	7,150	16,926
Giles	73.2%	5,240	25.2%	1,805	1.6%	115	3,435	7,160
Grainger	43.8%	2,010	52.8%	2,424	3.5%	160	-414	4,594
Greene	40.1%	7,056	46.1%	8,106	13.8%	2,435	-1,050	17,597
Grundy	78.0%	2,993	19.4%	746	2.6%	100	2,247	3,839
Hamblen	47.6%	7,452	42.3%	6,628	10.1%	1,583	824	15,663
Hamilton	49.2%	54,623	43.8%	48,548	7.0%	7,742	6,075	110,913
Hancock	41.3%	783	56.3%	1,068	2.4%	45	-285	1,896
Hardeman	63.5%	4,494	26.2%	1,854	10.3%	725	2,640	7,073
Hardin	60.8%	4,504	36.3%	2,685	2.9%	213	1,819	7,402
Hawkins	45.9%	6,413	46.8%	6,540	7.3%	1,027	-127	13,980
Haywood	65.8%	4,005	24.7%	1,506	9.4%	574	2,499	6,085
Henderson	58.9%	4,423	37.9%	2,843	3.2%	241	1,580	7,507
Henry	72.8%	7,426	25.1%	2,563	2.1%	218	4,863	10,207
Hickman	75.9%	3,983	22.1%	1,161	1.9%	102	2,822	5,246
Houston	80.9%	2,077	15.7%	402	3.5%	89	1,675	2,568
Humphreys	81.4%	4,780	16.7%	980	1.9%	109	3,800	5,869
Jackson	87.9%	3,971	11.0%	496	1.1%	50	3,475	4,517
Jefferson	45.2%	4,733	49.2%	5,148	5.6%	581	-415	10,462
Johnson	34.2%	1,563	63.5%	2,900	2.2%	101	-1,337	4,564
Knox	54.7%	65,091	39.7%	47,269	5.6%	6,632	17,822	118,992
Lake	72.4%	1,312	25.1%	454	2.5%	46	858	1,812
Lauderdale	69.1%	4,893	26.8%	1,894	4.1%	290	2,999	7,077
Lawrence	63.1%	7,359	35.4%	4,126	1.5%	171	3,233	11,656
Lewis	77.2%	2,424	21.2%	665	1.6%	49	1,759	3,138
Lincoln	76.7%	5,606	20.6%	1,505	2.7%	201	4,101	7,312
Loudon	50.5%	5,190	45.1%	4,631	4.4%	452	559	10,273
Macon	74.0%	3,770	25.4%	1,296	0.6%	32	2,474	5,098
Madison	62.8%	18,791	28.9%	8,637	8.3%	2,483	10,154	29,911
Marion	63.0%	5,399	35.2%	3,016	1.9%	159	2,383	8,574
Marshall	76.0%	4,717	22.2%	1,378	1.8%	113	3,339	6,208
Maury	71.8%	10,990	26.4%	4,042	1.8%	277	6,948	15,309
McMinn	49.5%	7,478	47.4%	7,169	3.1%	462	309	15,109
McNairy	61.3%	5,121	35.4%	2,961	3.3%	275	2,160	8,357
Meigs	51.7%	1,270	46.1%	1,133	2.2%	54	137	2,457
Monroe	50.2%	5,408	47.9%	5,159	1.9%	209	249	10,776
Montgomery	67.4%	14,946	27.1%	6,013	5.5%	1,212	8,933	22,171
Moore	79.0%	1,294	19.8%	324	1.3%	21	970	1,639
Morgan	61.8%	3,001	36.0%	1,747	2.3%	110	1,254	4,858
Obion	57.9%	5,903	37.8%	3,853	4.4%	444	2,050	10,200
Overton	81.8%	4,089	17.3%	864	0.9%	46	3,225	4,999
Perry	80.0%	1,783	18.3%	408	1.7%	38	1,375	2,229
Pickett	57.8%	1,087	41.7%	784	0.5%	9	303	1,880
Polk	55.4%	2,678	43.2%	2,091	1.4%	69	587	4,838
Putnam	75.1%	12,183	22.4%	3,638	2.4%	392	8,545	16,213
Rhea	44.6%	3,674	45.2%	3,730	10.2%	841	-56	8,245
Roane	56.6%	9,914	39.3%	6,897	4.1%	719	3,017	17,530
Robertson	77.3%	8,403	20.2%	2,201	2.5%	268	6,202	10,872
Rutherford	73.1%	21,737	23.0%	6,852	3.9%	1,157	14,885	29,746
Scott	55.3%	2,499	42.5%	1,923	2.2%	101	576	4,523
Sequatchie	55.6%	1,616	41.8%	1,215	2.6%	75	401	2,906
Sevier	37.0%	5,652	53.9%	8,235	9.2%	1,400	-2,583	15,287
Shelby	59.6%	187,944	32.6%	102,831	7.8%	24,506	85,113	315,281
Smith	88.5%	5,107	11.0%	633	0.6%	33	4,474	5,773
Stewart	78.2%	2,591	20.1%	666	1.7%	55	1,925	3,312
Sullivan	49.4%	25,537	39.3%	20,289	11.3%	5,858	5,248	51,684
Sumner	73.2%	21,292	23.9%	6,954	2.9%	840	14,338	29,086
Tipton	60.6%	6,072	33.8%	3,391	5.6%	564	2,681	10,027
Trousdale	87.9%	1,706	11.1%	215	1.0%	19	1,491	1,940
Unicoi	43.9%	2,460	46.6%	2,616	9.5%	533	-156	5,609
Union	51.3%	1,946	46.3%	1,758	2.4%	91	188	3,795
Van Buren	78.7%	1,167	21.0%	311	0.3%	4	856	1,482
Warren	76.7%	7,272	20.6%	1,949	2.7%	259	5,323	9,480
Washington	49.6%	14,915	39.4%	11,859	10.9%	3,292	3,056	30,066
Wayne	48.5%	2,154	50.1%	2,223	1.4%	61	-69	4,438
Weakley	65.0%	7,277	30.8%	3,444	4.2%	474	3,833	11,195
White	78.1%	4,751	20.5%	1,245	1.4%	85	3,506	6,081
Williamson	59.1%	14,286	34.9%	8,442	5.9%	1,428	5,844	24,156
Wilson	75.2%	15,762	22.4%	4,702	2.3%	491	11,060	20,955
Total	60.7%	1,000,607	33.8%	557,016	5.5%	90,413	443,591	1,648,036

== See also ==
- 1984 United States Senate elections
- 1984 United States presidential election in Tennessee
