= Crutchfield (surname) =

Crutchfield is a surname of English origin, derived from a place-name that refers to a field containing a burial mound: Celtic cruc (burial mound; cf. Welsh crug) + Anglo-Saxon feld (field).

Notable people named Crutchfield include:

- Allison Crutchfield (active 2007–2016), US musician, twin sister of Katie Crutchfield
- Buddy Crutchfield (born 1976), US football player
- E. Bryant Crutchfield (active late 1970s), Trapper Keeper inventor
- David Crutchfield (1965–2002), Australian Rules football player
- Dwayne Crutchfield (born 1959), US American football player
- Finis Alonzo Crutchfield Jr. (1916–1987), US Methodist bishop
- James Crutchfield (1912–2001), US singer, pianist & songwriter
- James P. Crutchfield (born 1955), US mathematician & physicist
- Jan Crutchfield (1938–2012), US songwriter
- Jimmie Crutchfield (1910–1933), US professional Negro leagues baseball player
- Jerry Crutchfield (1934–2022), US country & pop record producer, songwriter & musician
- Johnnie Crutchfield (born 1947), US politician in Oklahoma
- Katie Crutchfield (active 2007–2020), US musician, twin sister of Allison Crutchfield
- Les Crutchfield (1916–1966), US screenwriter known for Escape (radio program)
- Linda Crutchfield-Bocock (1942–2026), Canadian alpine skier and luger
- Michael Crutchfield (born 1961), Australian politician of Victorian Legislative Assembly
- Nels Crutchfield (1911–1985), Canadian professional hockey player
- Robin Crutchfield (born 1952), US artist
- Shireen Crutchfield (born 1970), US actress
- Stapleton Crutchfield (1835–1865), Virginian officer in Confederate States army during US Civil War
- Thomas Crutchfield Sr. (1801–1850), mayor of Chattanooga, Tennessee, USA in 1849
- Ward Crutchfield (1928–2016, US politician of Tennessee Senate
- Will Crutchfield (born 1957), US conductor, musicologist
- William Crutchfield (1824–90), US politician
