= Mayoral elections in Chattanooga, Tennessee =

Mayoral elections in Chattanooga are held every four years to elect the mayor of Chattanooga, Tennessee.

All Chattanooga municipal elections are required to be non-partisan, but most candidates can be affiliated with political parties.

== 2001 ==
2001 Chattanooga mayoral election
- March 6, 2001
- Registered: 97,015
- Turnout: 31.8%
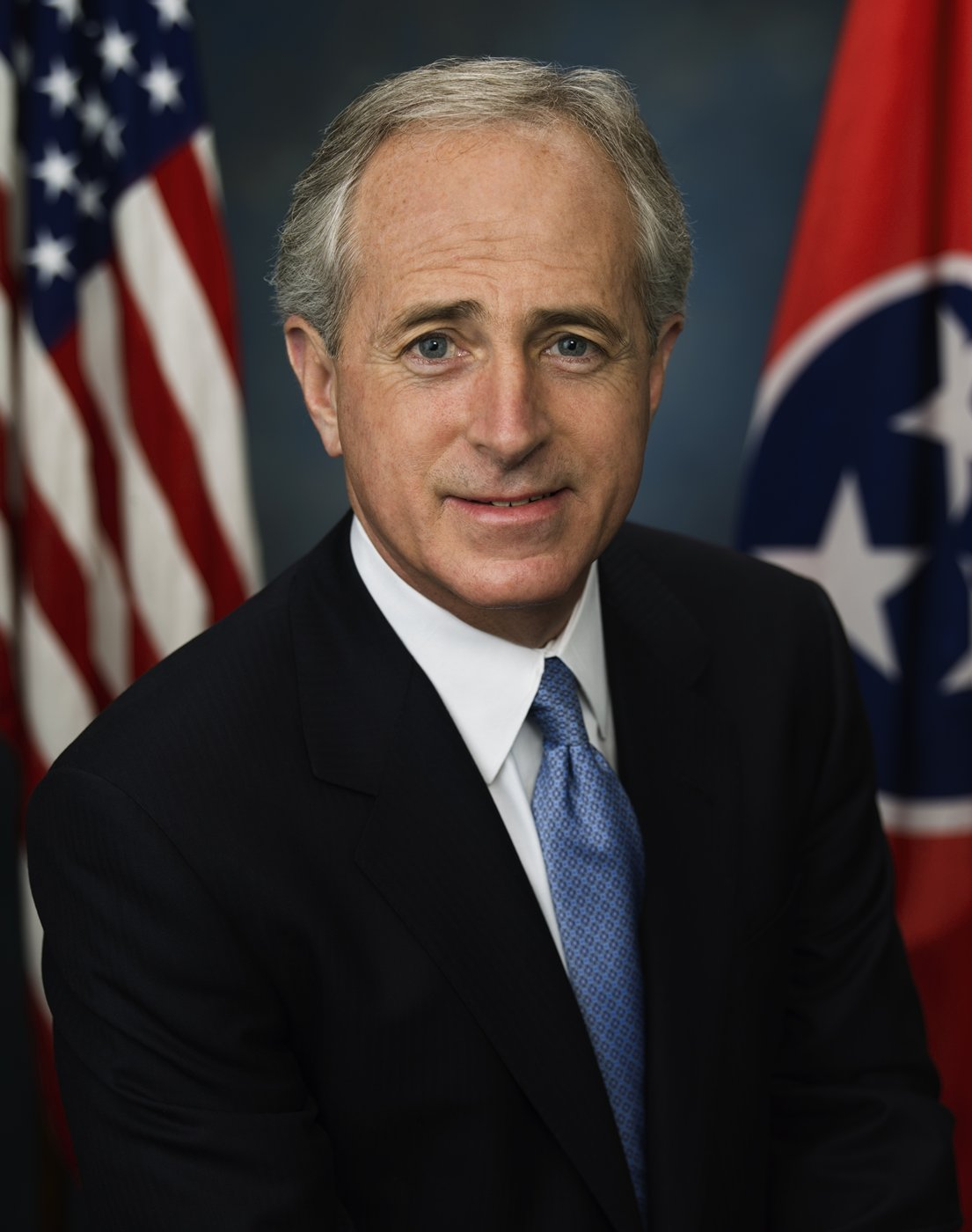

Candidate	Bob Corker	Irvin Overton	Dan Johnson
Popular vote	16,584	9,289	2,472
Percentage	53.82%	30.15%	8.02%
Mayor before election
Jon Kinsey
Democratic
Elected mayor
Bob Corker
Republican

=== Endorsements ===
Irvin Overton
- William Cotton, Hamilton County commissioner from District 4 (Democratic)
- John "Duke" Franklin, city councilman

=== Results ===
General election results
Party	Candidate	Votes	%
Nonpartisan	Bob Corker	16,584	53.82%
Nonpartisan	Irvin Overton	9,289	30.15%
Nonpartisan	Marti Rutherford	2,472	8.02%
Nonpartisan	David Crockett	1,308	4.25%
Nonpartisan	John Wolfe Jr.	890	2.89%
Nonpartisan	Ed Bibbins	68	0.22%
Nonpartisan	Eddie Ewbanks	53	0.17%
Nonpartisan	Tony Peoples	48	0.16%
Nonpartisan	Laura Carter	38	0.12%
Nonpartisan	Thomas E. Smith II	26	0.08%
Nonpartisan	Mike Shepherd	8	0.03%
Nonpartisan	Leonard Rowe	7	0.02%
Write-in		21	0.07%
Total votes		30,812	100.00%

== 2005 ==
2005 Chattanooga mayoral election
- March 1, 2005 (general); April 12, 2005 (run-off)
- Registered: 92,657
- Turnout: 27.51% (general); 30.44% (run-off)
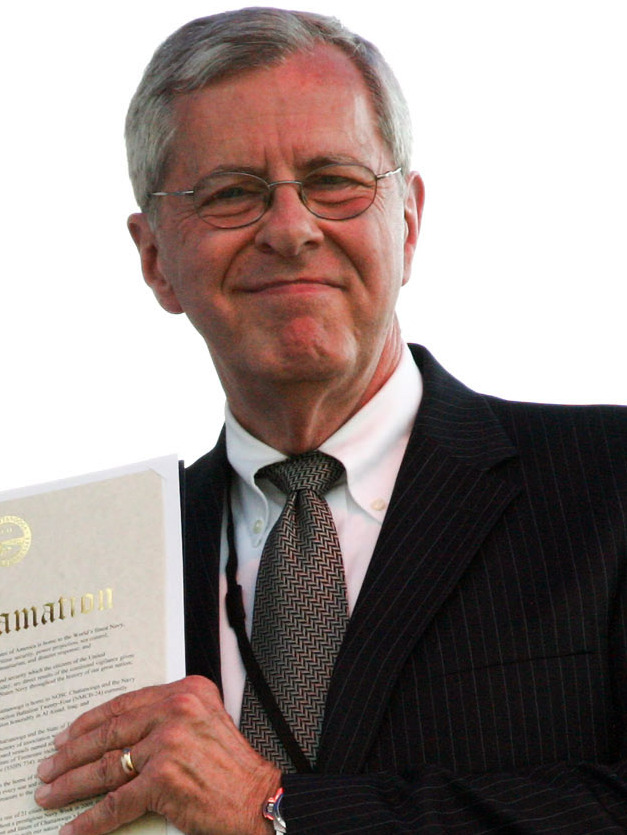

Candidate	Ron Littlefield	Ann Coulter	Dan Johnson
First round	9,154; 35.91%	10,784; 42.31%	4,911; 19.27%
Runoff	15,224; 54.11%	12,873; 45.76%	Eliminated
Mayor before election
Bob Corker
Republican
Elected mayor
Ron Littlefield
Independent

The 2005 Chattanooga mayoral election was held on March 1, 2005, and on April 12, 2005 (as a run-off), to elect the mayor of Chattanooga. Incumbent Republican mayor Bob Corker was eligible to run for a second term, but decided to run for U.S. Senate instead. Ann Coulter won a plurality of the vote in the first round with 42.31%, but lost the run-off election to Ron Littlefield, who earned 54.11% of the vote.

=== Results ===
==== General ====
March 1, 2005 general election results
Party	Candidate	Votes	%
Nonpartisan	Ann Coulter	10,784	42.31%
Nonpartisan	Ron Littlefield	9,154	35.91%
Nonpartisan	Dan Johnson	4,911	19.27%
Nonpartisan	Angela D. Clark	245	0.96%
Nonpartisan	Karl D. Epperson	138	0.54%
Nonpartisan	Eddie Bubba Eubank	95	0.37%
Nonpartisan	Thomas Smith II	88	0.35%
Nonpartisan	R. Buzzy Hamilton	48	0.19%
Write-in		25	0.10%
Total votes		25,488	100.00%

==== Run-off ====
April 12, 2005 run-off election results
Party	Candidate	Votes	%
Nonpartisan	Ron Littlefield	15,224	54.11%
Nonpartisan	Ann Coulter	12,873	45.76%
Write-in		37	0.13%
Total votes		28,134	100.00%

== 2009 ==
2009 Chattanooga mayoral election
- March 3, 2009
- Registered: 99,024
- Turnout: 18.08%
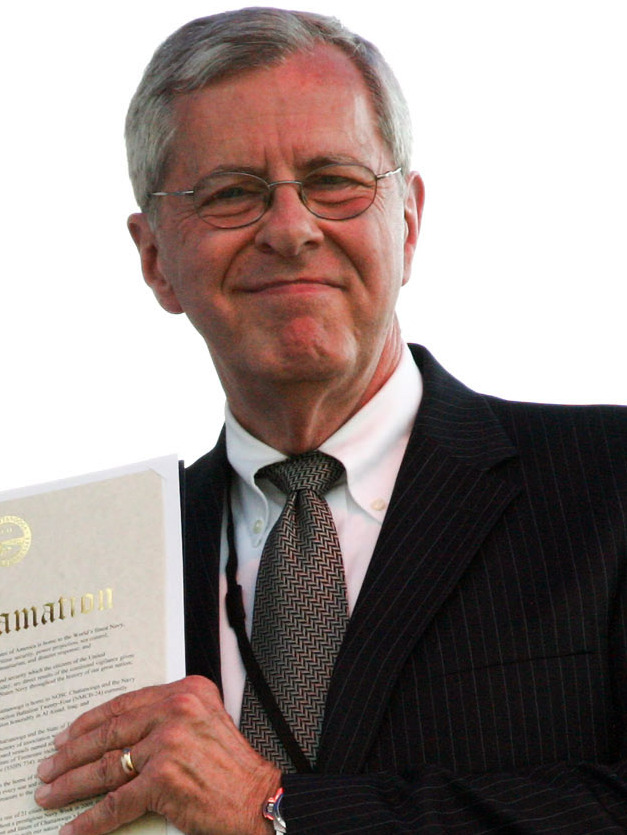

Candidate	Ron Littlefield	Rob Healy
Popular vote	10,234	7,186
Percentage	57.13%	40.12%
Mayor before election
Ron Littlefield
Independent
Elected mayor
Ron Littlefield
Independent

The 2009 Chattanooga mayoral election was held on March 3, 2009, to elect the next mayor of Chattanooga. Incumbent independent Mayor Ron Littlefield ran for re-election and was re-elected with 57.13% of the vote.

=== Candidates ===
- Rob Healy, Chattanooga Parks and Recreation administrator
- Joe Lance, blogger (withdrew, endorsed Healy)
- Ron Littlefield, incumbent mayor
- Thomas Smith II, perennial candidate

=== Results ===
March 3, 2009 general election results
Party	Candidate	Votes	%
Nonpartisan	Ron Littlefield	10,234	57.13%
Nonpartisan	Rob Healy	7,186	40.12%
Nonpartisan	Thomas Smith II	353	1.97%
Nonpartisan	Joe Lance	105	0.59%
Write-in		35	0.20%
Total votes		17,913	100.00%

== 2013 ==
2013 Chattanooga mayoral election
- March 5, 2013
- Turnout: 16.4%
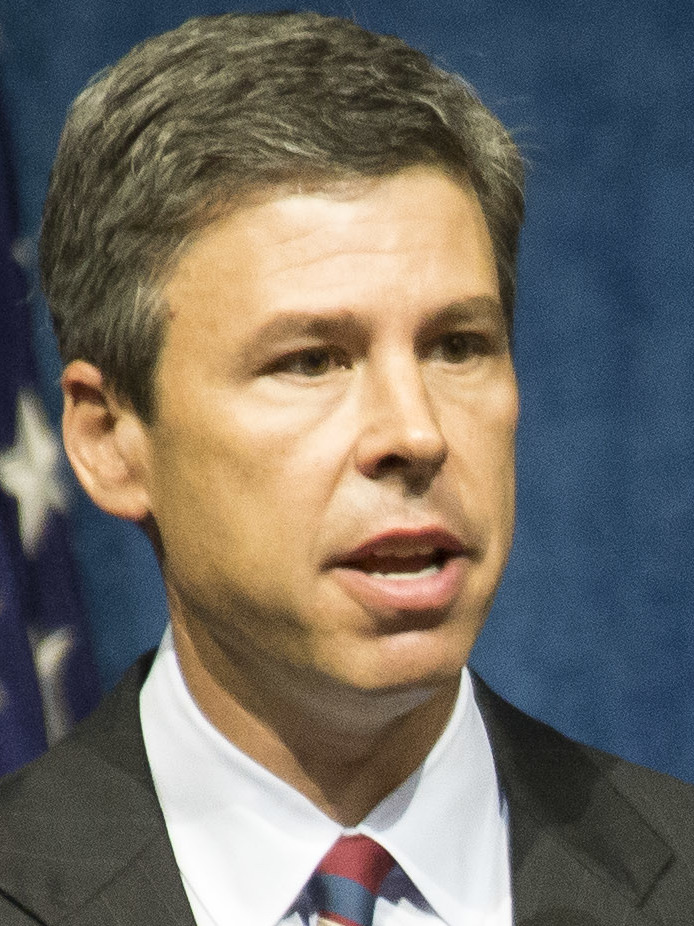

Candidate	Andy Berke	Guy Satterfield
Popular vote	12,918	4,229
Percentage	72.28%	23.66%
Mayor before election
Ron Littlefield
Independent
Elected mayor
Andy Berke
Democratic

The 2013 Chattanooga mayoral election was held on March 5, 2013, to elect the next mayor of Chattanooga. Incumbent Independent Mayor Ron Littlefield was term-limited and ineligible to run for re-election. Democratic candidate Andy Berke was elected with 72.3% of the vote, defeating Guy Satterfield.

=== Candidates ===
- Andy Berke, former member of the Tennessee Senate from district 10
- R. Chester Heathingt, former city employee
- Guy Satterfield, former city employee

=== Results ===
March 5, 2013 general election results
Party	Candidate	Votes	%
Nonpartisan	Andy Berke	12,918	72.28%
Nonpartisan	Guy Satterfield	4,229	23.66%
Nonpartisan	R. Chester Heathingt	659	3.69%
Write-in		67	0.37%
Total votes		17,873	100.00%
Democratic gain from Independent			

== 2017 ==
2017 Chattanooga mayoral election
- March 7, 2017
- Turnout: 19.7%
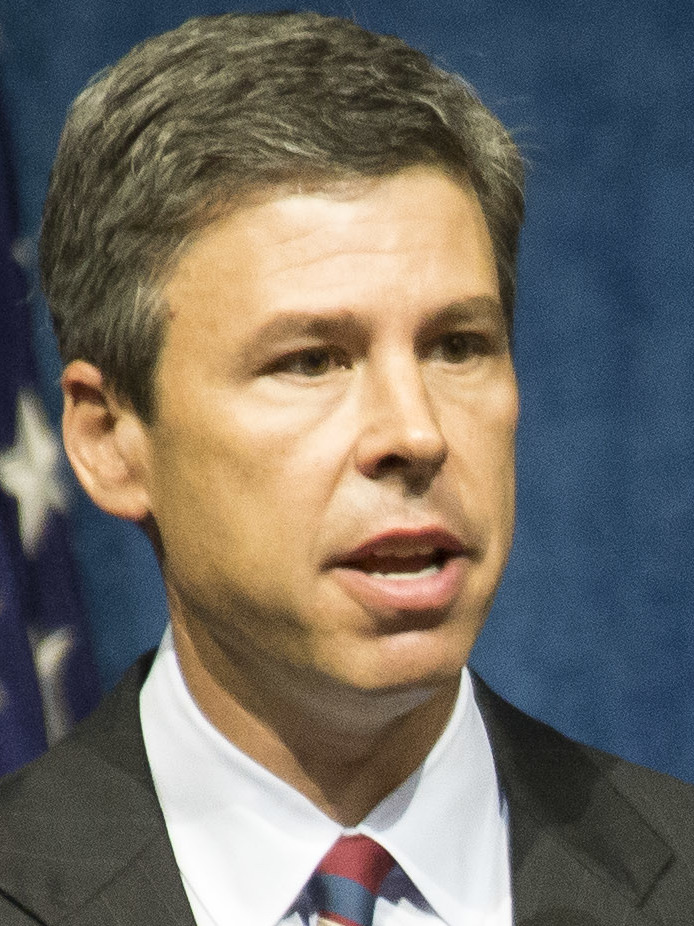

Candidate	Andy Berke	Larry Grohn	David Crockett
Popular vote	11,994	4,941	1,438
Percentage	63.87%	26.41%	7.66%
Results by city council district
Berke
40–50%
50–60%
60–70%
70–80%
80–90%
Mayor before election
Andy Berke
Democratic
Elected mayor
Andy Berke
Democratic

The 2017 Chattanooga mayoral election was held on March 7, 2017, to elect the mayor of Chattanooga. Incumbent Democratic Mayor Andy Berke won re-election against City Councilman Larry Grohn, former City Councilman David Crockett, and businessman Chris Long. Grohn and Crockett were aligned with the Republican Party.

Andy Berke won a majority of the vote in the initial round, so no runoff election was needed. This election took place alongside other 2017 Chattanooga elections, including races for City Council. Berke was sworn in to his second term on April 18, 2017.

=== Candidates ===
- Andy Berke (D), incumbent mayor
- David Crockett (R), former three-term Chattanooga City Council chairman
- Larry Grohn (R), Chattanooga city councilman
- Chris Long (I), PhD in architecture engineering

=== Results ===
March 7, 2017 general election results
Party	Candidate	Votes	%
Nonpartisan	Andy Berke (incumbent)	11,994	63.87%
Nonpartisan	Larry Grohn	4,941	26.41%
Nonpartisan	David Crockett	1,438	7.66%
Nonpartisan	Chris long	407	2.17%
Total votes		18,780	100.00%

== 2021 ==
2021 Chattanooga mayoral election
- March 2, 2021 (first round); April 13, 2021 (runoff)
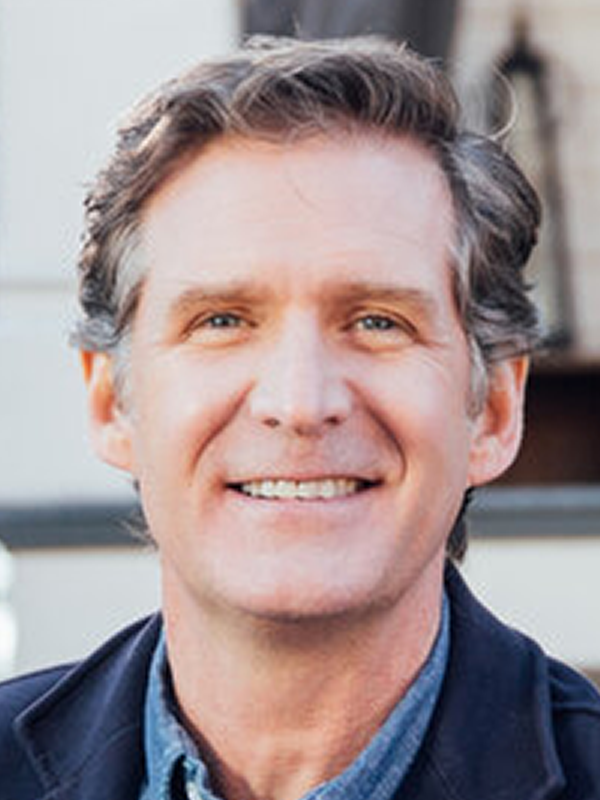

Candidate	Tim Kelly	Kim White
First round	8,566; 30.15%	8,290; 29.17%
Runoff	15,969; 59.87%	10,662; 39.97%
Candidate	Wade Hinton	Monty R. Bruell
First round	6,110; 21.50%	2,408; 8.47%
Runoff	Eliminated	Eliminated
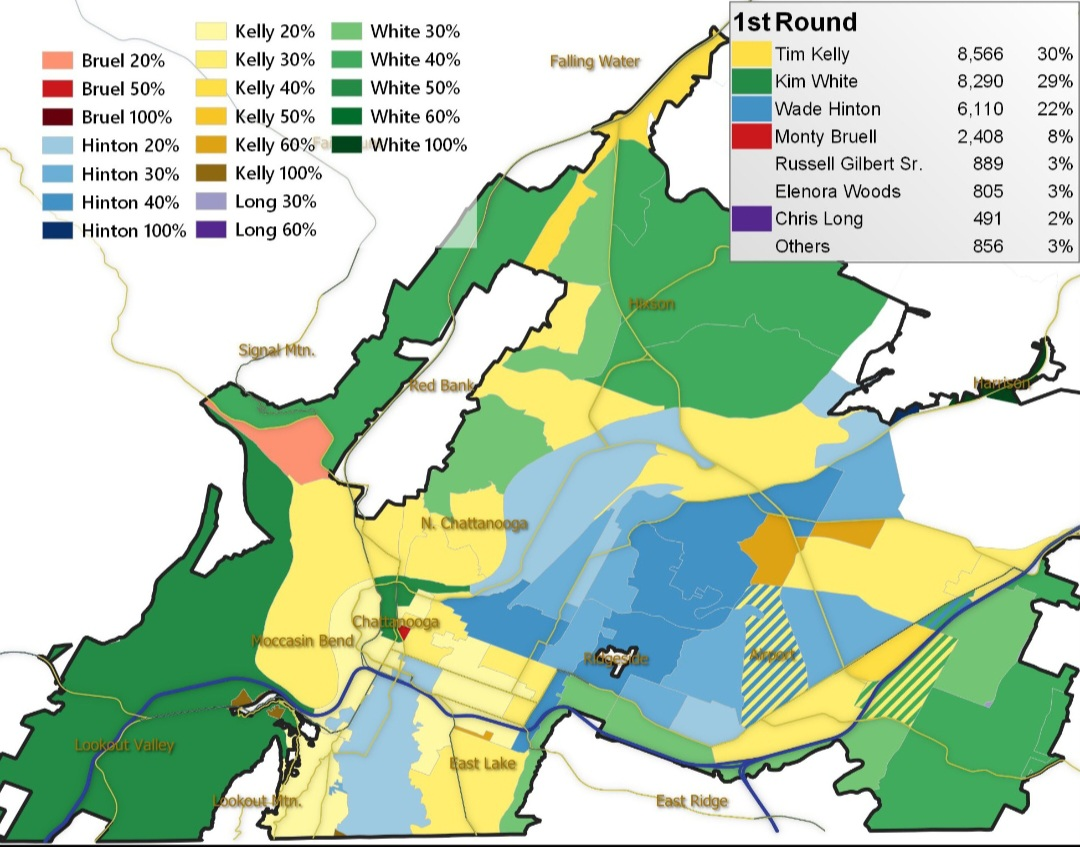
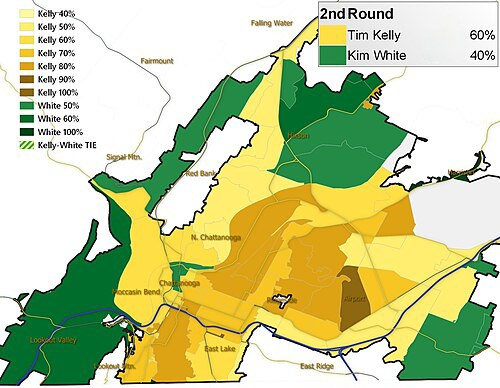
Mayor before election
Andy Berke
Democratic
Elected mayor
Tim Kelly
Independent

The 2021 Chattanooga mayoral election was held on March 2, 2021, and on April 13, 2021 (as a runoff), to elect the next mayor of Chattanooga. Incumbent Democratic Mayor Andy Berke was term-limited and ineligible to run for re-election. Since there was no candidate that received a majority of votes in the initial round of the election, a runoff election was held. In the runoff election, Independent candidate Tim Kelly was elected with 59.9% of the vote, defeating Republican candidate Kim White.

This two-round election took place alongside other 2021 Chattanooga elections, including races for City Council. Kelly was sworn in on April 19, 2021.

=== Candidates ===
==== Advanced to the runoff ====
- Tim Kelly, businessman (Independent)
- Kim White, CEO (Republican)

==== Eliminated in the first round ====
- Monty Bell
- Monty Bruell (Democratic) (endorsed Kelly)
- Lon Cartwright
- Christopher Dahl (Independent)
- D'Angelo Davis, activist (Democratic)
- Russell Gilbert Sr., councilman from the 5th district (Republican)
- Wade Hinton, attorney (Democratic) (endorsed Kelly)
- Christopher Long (Independent)
- George Ryan Love, candidate for Tennessee's 3rd congressional district in 2016 (Democratic)
- Andrew McLaren, actor (Independent)
- Erskine Oglesby, councilman from the 7th district (Republican)
- Robert Wilson
- Elenora Woods, activist (Democratic) (endorsed Kelly)

=== First round ===
==== First round polling ====
Pollster	Poll sponsor	Sample size	Margin of size	Monty Bell	Monty Bruell	Lon Cartwright	Christopher Dahl	D'Angelo Davis	Russell J. Gilbert Sr	Wade Hinton	Tim Kelly	Christopher Long	George Ryan Love	Andrew McLaren	Erskine Oglesby	Kim White	Robert Wilson	Elenora Woods	Other	Undecided
The Chattanoogan	—N/a	2896 (LV)	±	0%	3%	0%	1%	0%	3%	8%	50%	0%	0%	1%	4%	26%	0%	5%	1%	0%
The Chattanoogan	—N/a	3057 (LV)	±4%	1%	3%	0%	1%	1%	2%	7%	52%	1%	0%	1%	2%	25%	1%	3%	1%	0%

==== First round endorsements ====
Tim Kelly

Hamilton County commissioners

- Chip Baker, district 2
- David Sharpe, district 6 (2018–present)

Individuals

- 70 business leaders

Labor unions

- International Association of Fire Fighters Local 820
Kim White

Labor unions

- Fraternal Order of Police Lodge #22
- International Brotherhood of Police Local 673

==== First round results ====
2021 Chattanooga mayoral election first round
Party	Candidate	Votes	%	±%
Nonpartisan	Tim Kelly	8,566	30.15%	N/A
Nonpartisan	Kim White	8,290	29.17%	N/A
Nonpartisan	Wade Hinton	6,110	21.50%	N/A
Nonpartisan	Monty R. Bruell	2,408	8.47%	N/A
Nonpartisan	Russell J. Gilbert Sr.	889	3.13%	N/A
Nonpartisan	Elenora Woods	805	2.83%	N/A
Nonpartisan	Chris Long	491	1.73%	N/A
Nonpartisan	Erskine Oglesby Jr.	322	1.13%	N/A
Nonpartisan	Monty Dewayne Bell	157	0.55%	N/A
Nonpartisan	Robert C. Wilson	136	0.48%	N/A
Nonpartisan	Andrew McLaren	61	0.21%	N/A
Nonpartisan	D'Angelo Davis	61	0.21%	N/A
Nonpartisan	Christopher Dahl	53	0.19%	N/A
Write-in		38	0.13%	N/A
Nonpartisan	George Ryan Love	18	0.06%	N/A
Nonpartisan	Lon Cartwright	10	0.04%	N/A
Total votes		28,415	100.00%	

=== Runoff ===
==== Runoff polling ====
Pollster	Poll Sponsor	Date administered	Sample size	Margin of size	Tim Kelly	Kim White	Undecided
Spry Strategies	Chattanooga Times Free Press	March 29, 2021	330 (LV)	±13%	51%	36%	13%

==== Runoff endorsements ====
Tim Kelly

Hamilton County commissioners

- Chip Baker, district 2
- David Sharpe, district 6 (2018–present)

Individuals

- 70 business leaders

Labor unions

- International Association of Fire Fighters Local 820
Kim White

Labor unions

- Fraternal Order of Police Lodge #22
- International Brotherhood of Police Local 673

==== Runoff results ====
2021 Chattanooga mayoral election runoff
Party	Candidate	Votes	%	±%
Nonpartisan	Tim Kelly	15,969	59.87%	N/A
Nonpartisan	Kim White	10,662	39.97%	N/A
Write-in		44	0.16%	N/A
Total votes		26,675	100.0%	
Independent gain from Democratic				

== 2025 ==
2025 Chattanooga mayoral election
- March 4, 2025
- Turnout: 17.9% (unofficial)
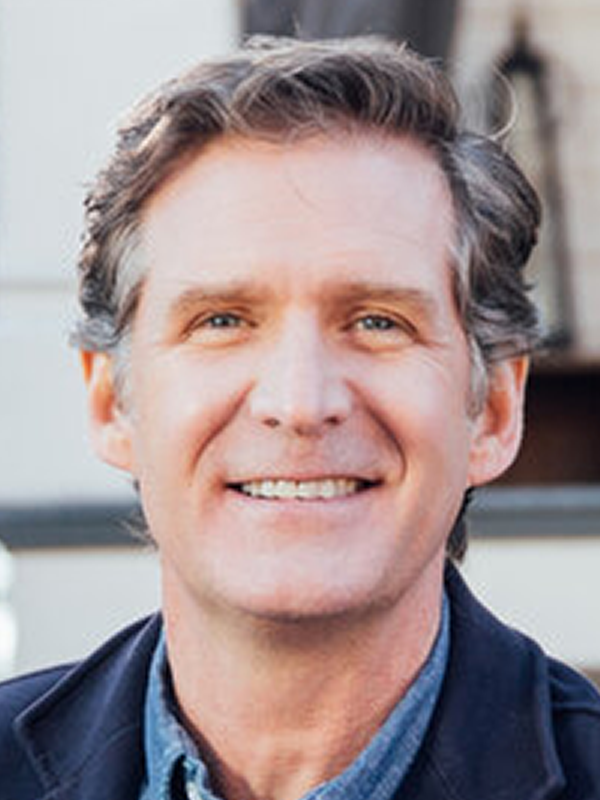

Candidate	Tim Kelly	Chris Long
Popular vote	17,356	2,750
Percentage	85.44%	13.54%
Results by precinct
Kelly:
>90%
80–90%
70–80%
60–70%
Tie:
50%
No votes
Mayor before election
Tim Kelly
Independent
Elected mayor
Tim Kelly
Independent

The 2025 Chattanooga mayoral election was held on March 4, 2025, to elect the mayor of Chattanooga. Incumbent Independent mayor Tim Kelly won re-election to a second term in office. All Chattanooga municipal elections are required to be non-partisan, but most candidates are known to be affiliated with political parties.

=== Background ===
On March 14, 2023, there was a proposal to make city elections aligned with county and state and national elections alongside city council term limits. However, it was rejected by the city council, making the mayor and council elections continue to be stand-alone in the future.

=== Candidates ===
==== Declared ====
The following candidates were approved for the March ballot:

- Tim Kelly, incumbent mayor (party affiliation: Independent)
- Chris Long, candidate for mayor in 2021 (party affiliation: Independent)

==== Endorsements ====
Declined to endorse
- Hamilton County Republican Party

=== Results ===
2025 Chattanooga mayoral election (unofficial results)
Party	Candidate	Votes	%
Nonpartisan	Tim Kelly	17,356	85.44%
Nonpartisan	Chris Long	2,750	13.54%
Write-in		208	1.02%
Total votes		20,314	100.00%

== See also ==
- Elections in Tennessee
- Political party strength in Tennessee
- Government of Tennessee
- List of mayors of Chattanooga, Tennessee
- Timeline of Chattanooga, Tennessee
- Mayoral elections in Clarksville, Tennessee
- Mayoral elections in Knoxville, Tennessee
- Mayoral elections in Murfreesboro, Tennessee
