= Andrew McLaren =

Andrew or Andy McLaren may refer to:

- Andy McLaren (footballer, born 1922) (1922–1996), Scottish international footballer
- Andrew McLaren (curler), Scottish curler
- Andy McLaren (born 1973), Scottish international footballer
- Andrew McLaren (actor) (born 1980), American film and television actor

== See also ==
- Andrew MacLaren (1883–1975), British politician
