= The Read House Hotel =

- Read House
- U.S. National Register of Historic Places
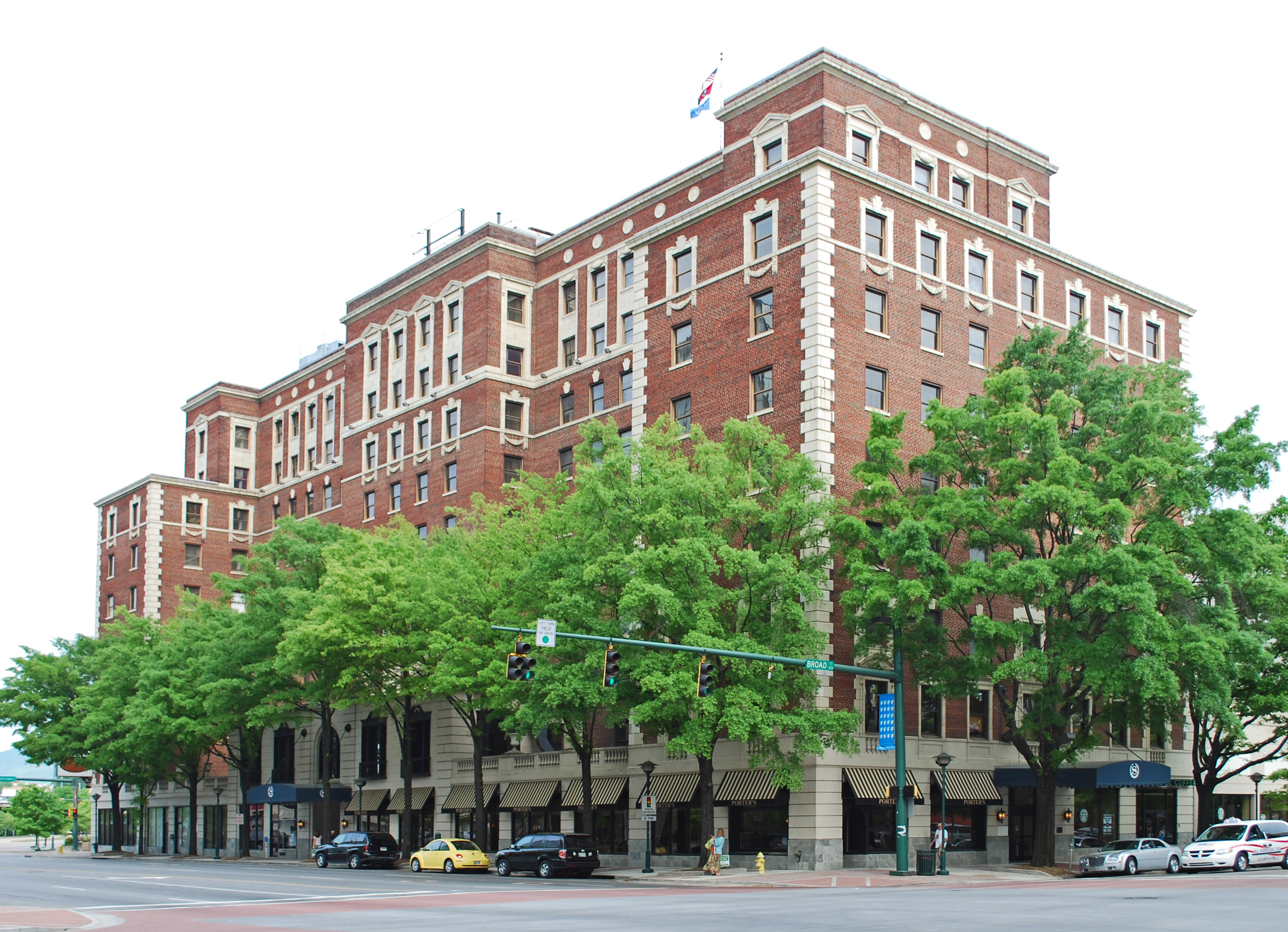

- Location within Tennessee Location within the United States
- Location: Chattanooga, Tennessee
- Coordinates: 35°02′46″N 85°18′39″W
- Built: 1926
- Architect: William Holabird & Martin Roche
- NRHP reference No.: 76001780
- Added to NRHP: December 23, 1976

The Read House Hotel is a historic hotel in Chattanooga, Tennessee, founded in 1872. The 141-room main building dates to 1926, and is listed on the National Register of Historic Places for Hamilton County. The 100-room rear wing was added in 1962, originally as a motel.

== History ==
=== Origins ===
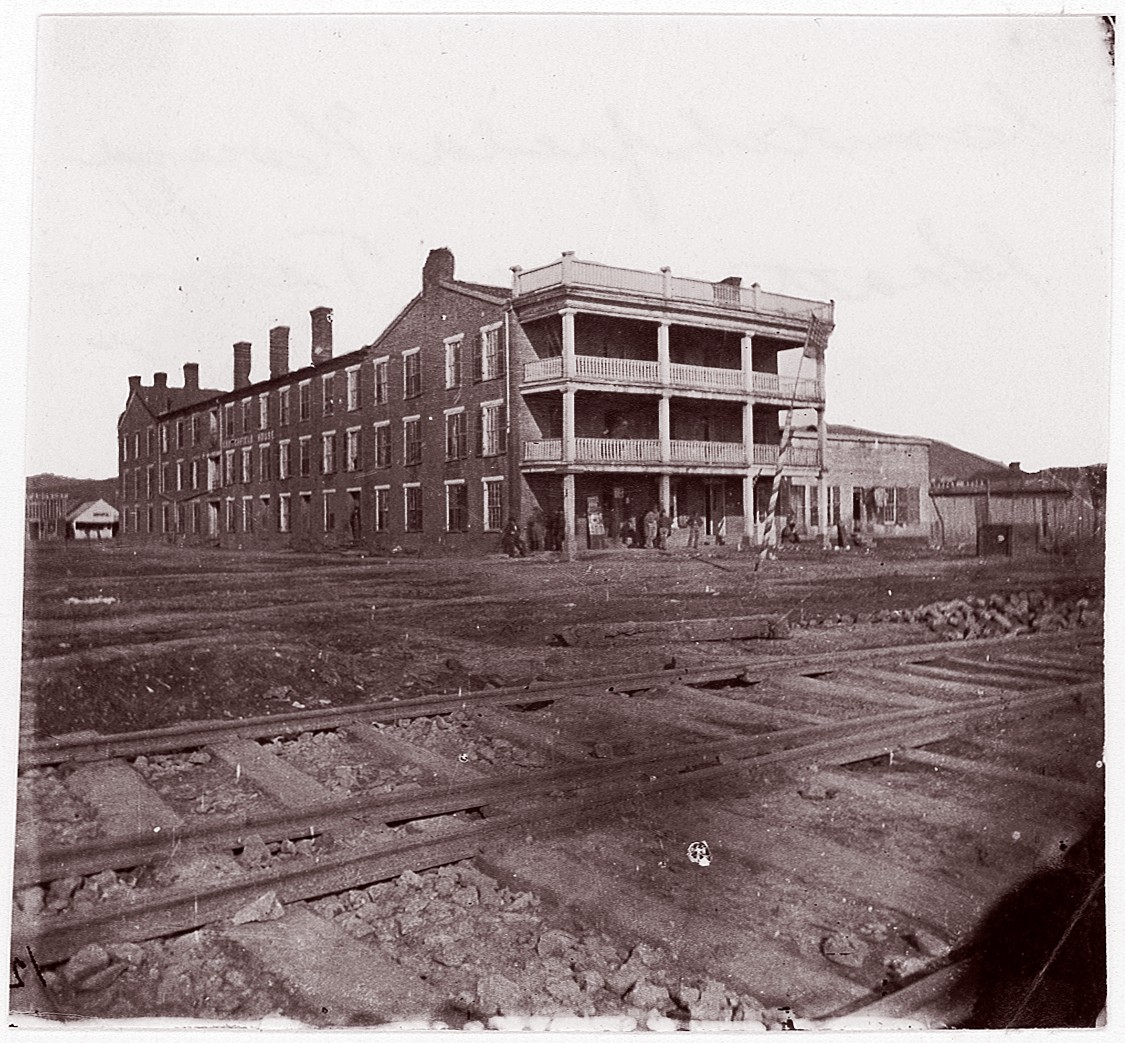
The Crutchfield House, circa 1864

The first hotel on the site, the Crutchfield House, opened in 1847. It was constructed by future Chattanooga Mayor Thomas Crutchfield Sr., directly across from the Union Depot. The railways were the main source of business and imports to the town and this constant flow of business allowed the Crutchfield House to prosper. Thomas Crutchfield, Sr. died in 1850, and his son, Thomas Crutchfield, Jr., also a future mayor of Chattanooga, took over the hotel.

Jefferson Davis stayed at the Crutchfield House on January 21, 1861, while traveling home to Mississippi after resigning from the United States Senate. Davis delivered a speech in favor of secession in the hotel's dining room, causing future congressman William Crutchfield (Thomas Crutchfield, Jr.'s brother) to deliver a fiery speech of his own, denouncing Davis as a "renegade and a traitor," and saying that Tennessee would not be "hood winked, bamboozled and dragged into your Southern, codfish, aristocratic, tory blooded, South Carolina mobocracy." A duel nearly resulted between the men and the argument at the hotel was widely reported as tensions grew on the eve of the Civil War.

In 1862, the hotel served as the headquarters for the local Confederate garrison. That winter, Confederate General Samuel Jones, commander of the Department of East Tennessee, converted the hotel to a military hospital. Chattanooga was occupied by the Union on September 9, 1863, and the 92nd Illinois Infantry Regiment placed its regimental colors atop the hotel to signal their control of the town. The hotel later served as a hospital for Union soldiers wounded at the Battle of Chickamauga. The Crutchfield House survived the war, but caught fire and burned down in 1867. After the fire, the Crutchfield family chose not to rebuild.

=== First Read House Hotel ===
Civil War surgeon John T. Read had previously owned a hotel with his wife Caroline in their hometown of McMinnville, Tennessee, which had similarly burned down. They moved to Chattanooga in 1871 and purchased a three-story office building that had been built on the site of the Crutchfield House. Read converted that structure to a 45-room hotel, the Read House Hotel, which opened on New Year's Day 1872. In 1879, he sold the hotel to his 19-year-old son, Samuel R. Read, who expanded the hotel to 202 rooms by 1902.

=== Modern Read House Hotel ===
In 1925, the majority of the original structure was torn down. It was replaced with the current 10-story Read House Hotel, opened on July 5, 1926. The new hotel was designed by the Chicago firm Holabird & Roche, in the Georgian style and constructed by the George A. Fuller Construction Company of Washington, D.C., at a cost of $2.7 million. The new wing had 280 rooms, while the remaining portion of the old structure had an additional 120 rooms, which were kept in operation until the new wing was completed, so the hotel did not need to fully close during construction. Samuel R. Read died in 1942, and in 1943 the hotel was sold to Albert Noe, Jr. He died four years later, and his son Albert Noe III assumed control of the hotel. In 1962, Noe built a six-story motel wing with an underground garage and an outdoor pool in the rear of the hotel, to appeal to travelers on the newly constructed Interstate Highway System. It is today known as the "Manor" wing. Provident Life and Accident Insurance Company bought the hotel from Noe in 1968 and retained the National Hotel Company to manage it.

In 1978, the hotel was sold to the owners of the nearby Chattanooga Choo-Choo Hotel and renamed the Choo-Choo Read House. A nightclub was added on the mezzanine, the Grand Central Station Disco, which remained in business until 1980. Soon after, the hotel became a Best Western franchise and was renamed the Best Western Choo-Choo Read House. The hotel would go through seven different owners between 1980 and 2000, as its luster slowly dimmed. Radisson Hotels assumed management in 1986 and the hotel became the Radisson Read House.

After an $11 million renovation in 2004, Sheraton Hotels assumed management and the hotel became the Sheraton Read House, reopening on November 18, 2004. The hotel dropped its affiliation with Sheraton in 2015 and became The Read House Historic Inn & Suites. On August 30, 2016, the hotel was purchased by Avocet Hospitality Group of Charleston, SC. The hotel was renovated at a cost of $27 million, which included the movement of the main entrance from Broad Street to its original location on Martin Luther King Jr. Blvd, in front of the hotel, the addition of multiple dining outlets and the renovation of all guest rooms. The hotel reopened in 2018 as The Read House. In 2022, the hotel celebrated its 150th anniversary.

== Famous visitors ==
In the heart of Chattanooga, the Read House has hosted many celebrities and politicians. Among them are presidents Ulysses S. Grant, Rutherford B. Hayes, Grover Cleveland, Theodore Roosevelt, William McKinley, Richard Nixon and Ronald Reagan, as well as Edwin Booth, Gene Autry, Elvis Presley, Oprah Winfrey, Gary Cooper, Winston Churchill, Bing Crosby, Walt Disney, Bob Hope, and Al Capone. Capone stayed in the Read House a short time during his federal trial in the early 20th century. Custom iron bars were added to the windows in the room Capone resided in (Room 311), and remain there to this day.

During the 2026 FIFA World Cup, the Read House was the base camp hotel for the Spain national football team, the eventual champions of the tournament. The nearby Baylor School was selected as their training site.

== Room 311 ==
Perhaps the thing the Read House is most known for is the haunting of room 311. Many believe the room harbors the spirit of a woman named Annalisa Netherly. There are many legends as to who this woman was and how she became the famous spirit to haunt the hotel, but it is most well known that Ms. Netherly was a prostitute in Chattanooga during 1920s and 1930's. She supposedly resided in room 311 for an extended time. While details are hazy, Ms. Netherly in fact died in that very room. Some legends have it that she was found soaking in the tub with her head almost completely decapitated- more than likely done by a jealous lover or husband. Other legends say that as she took a gentleman suitor to her room and he later directed his time and attention elsewhere to another woman. This supposedly left her broken hearted and suicidal, and it was then that Ms. Netherly took her own life. People who have stayed in room 311 say that Ms. Netherly hates men, especially those who smoke. Many guests that have stayed in the room, including Al Capone, have made it through the night without any paranormal activity, while others report it being heavy during their stay.
