= Crutchfield (disambiguation) =

Crutchfield is a surname.

Crutchfield may also refer to:

- Crutchfield Corporation, an electronics retailer
- Crutchfield, Kentucky
- Crutchfield, North Carolina

== See also ==
- Crutchfield Crossroads, North Carolina
