= Josh Bullocks =

American football player (born 1983)

No. 29, 36
- Position: Safety

Personal information
- Born: February 28, 1983 (age 43); Chattanooga, Tennessee, U.S.
- Listed height: 6 ft 0 in (1.83 m)
- Listed weight: 207 lb (94 kg)

Career information
- High school: Chattanooga (TN) Hixson
- College: Nebraska (2001–2004)
- NFL draft: 2005: 2nd round, 40th overall pick

Career history
- New Orleans Saints (2005–2008); Chicago Bears (2009–2010); Oakland Raiders (2011)*
- * Offseason or practice squad member only

Awards and highlights
- First-team All-American (2003); First-team All-Big 12 (2003); Second-team All-Big 12 (2004)

Career NFL statistics
- Total tackles: 291
- Sacks: 1
- Forced fumbles: 5
- Pass deflections: 27
- Interceptions: 6
- Stats at Pro Football Reference

Josh Bullocks (born February 28, 1983) is an American football safety. He was drafted by the New Orleans Saints in the second round of the 2005 NFL draft. He is the identical twin of fellow NFL safety Daniel Bullocks.

He played college football at Nebraska. Bullocks has also been a member of the Chicago Bears and Oakland Raiders. In January 2015, he joined the Omaha Beef of Champions Indoor Football as an assistant coach.

== Early life ==
Bullocks attended Hixson High School in Chattanooga, Tennessee, along with his brother Daniel from 1997 to 2001. Josh and Daniel were both multi-sport standouts participating in track and field, as well as excelling in football. Josh played running back throughout his high school career while Daniel played quarterback. The Bullocks brothers led the Hixson Wildcats to four consecutive TSSAA football playoff appearances. Josh and Daniel were heavily recruited by several NCAA Division I schools including the University of Tennessee before deciding to attend the University of Nebraska–Lincoln. They graduated in 2001.

== College career ==
Bullocks played college football at Nebraska, where he started 28 games in three seasons. He had ten interceptions and 49 tackles in 2003, when he was a finalist to win the Jim Thorpe Award.

== Professional career ==
=== New Orleans Saints ===
Bullocks was drafted by the New Orleans Saints and played four seasons with the team. During that time, he appeared in 62 games (49 starts) and recorded 256 tackles, one sack, six interceptions and 24 pass deflections.

=== Chicago Bears ===
An unrestricted free agent in the 2009 offseason, Bullocks signed a one-year contract with the Chicago Bears that included $525,000 in guaranteed money. The move put Bullocks in the same division as his twin brother, Daniel, who played for the Detroit Lions before being released in the 2010 offseason.

=== Oakland Raiders ===
The Raiders signed Bullocks on August 15, 2011, after Hiram Eugene suffered a serious hip injury in the pre-season opener. He was waived on August 30.

=== NFL statistics ===
Year	Team	GP	COMB	TOTAL	AST	SACK	FF	FR	FR YDS	INT	IR YDS	AVG IR	LNG	TD	PD
2005	NO	16	67	53	14	0.0	0	0	0	1	51	51	51	0	6
2006	NO	16	72	57	15	0.0	1	0	0	2	14	7	14	0	7
2007	NO	14	77	65	12	1.0	2	0	0	2	6	3	6	0	8
2008	NO	16	41	34	7	0.0	2	0	0	1	23	23	23	0	6
2009	CHI	12	23	19	4	0.0	0	0	0	0	0	0	0	0	0
2010	CHI	16	11	8	3	0.0	0	0	0	0	0	0	0	0	0
Career		90	291	236	55	1.0	5	0	0	6	94	16	51	0	27

== Personal life ==
Josh Bullocks is the identical twin brother of Daniel Bullocks, also a safety at the University of Nebraska, who was also drafted 40th overall when the Detroit Lions selected him in the 2006 NFL draft. The two are cousins of U.S. Olympic gold medalist Evelyn Ashford.

Beginning in 2007, Bullocks and his brother have awarded a $5,000 scholarship to a Hixson High senior athlete. In order to be eligible the student must attend Hixson, be a senior, be an athlete, and write an essay.
