= Daniel Bullocks =

American football player and coach (born 1983)

Green Bay Packers
- Title: Cornerbacks coach

Personal information
- Born: February 28, 1983 (age 43); Chattanooga, Tennessee, U.S.
- Listed height: 6 ft 0 in (1.83 m)
- Listed weight: 212 lb (96 kg)

Career information
- Position: Safety (No. 27)
- High school: Hixson (Chattanooga)
- College: Nebraska (2001–2005)
- NFL draft: 2006: 2nd round, 40th overall pick

Career history

Playing
- Detroit Lions (2006–2009)

Coaching
- Northern Iowa (2012–2014) Defensive backs coach; Eastern Michigan (2015) Cornerbacks coach; Jacksonville Jaguars (2016) Assistant defensive backs coach; San Francisco 49ers (2017–2025); Assistant defensive backs (2017-2018); Safeties coach (2019-2022); Defensive backs coach (2023); Defensive passing game coordinator & defensive backs coach (2024-2025); Green Bay Packers (2026–present) Cornerbacks coach

Awards and highlights
- Second-team All-Big 12 (2005)

Career NFL statistics
- Total tackles: 169
- Sacks: 1
- Forced fumbles: 4
- Fumble recoveries: 1
- Defensive touchdowns: 1
- Stats at Pro Football Reference

Daniel Bullocks (born February 28, 1983) is an American football coach and former player who is the cornerbacks coach for the Green Bay Packers of the National Football League (NFL). He played football professionally as safety in the National Football League (NFL) with the Detroit Lions from 2006 to 2010. He was selected by the Lions in the second round of the 2006 NFL draft following his college football playing career at Nebraska.

== Early life ==
Bullocks attended Hixson High School in Chattanooga, Tennessee, along with his brother Josh from 1997 to 2001. Daniel and Josh were both multi-sport standouts participating in track and field, as well as excelling in football. Daniel played quarterback throughout his high school career while Josh played running back. The Bullocks brothers led the Hixson Wildcats to four consecutive TSSAA football playoff appearances. Daniel and Josh were heavily recruited by several NCAA Division I schools including the University of Tennessee before deciding to attend the University of Nebraska–Lincoln. Daniel and Josh both graduated from Hixson High School in 2001.

== College career ==
Bullocks attended the University of Nebraska–Lincoln where he started 22 games in four seasons, serving as co-captain during his senior season, when he was selected as a second-team All-Big 12 Conference safety for the second consecutive year.

== Professional career ==
Pre-draft measurables
Height	Weight	Arm length	Hand span	40-yard dash	10-yard split	20-yard split	20-yard shuttle	Three-cone drill	Vertical jump	Broad jump	Bench press
6 ft 0 1/2 in (1.84 m)	212 lb (96 kg)	31 1/4 in (0.79 m)	10 1/2 in (0.27 m)	4.38 s	1.49 s	2.57 s	4.16 s	6.91 s	38.0 in (0.97 m)	10 ft 4 in (3.15 m)	18 reps
All values from NFL Combine

Bullocks was selected 40th overall by the Detroit Lions in the second round of the 2006 NFL draft. He played 31 games for the Lions, starting in 21. He was waived and subsequently placed on injured reserve on August 19, 2009. The Lions re-signed Bullocks on April 20, 2010. The Lions released him on July 8, 2010.

== Coaching career ==
=== College coaching ===
Bullocks served as the defensive secondary coach for the University of Northern Iowa from 2012 to 2014. On January 19, 2015, Bullocks was announced as the cornerbacks coach for Eastern Michigan University under head coach Chris Creighton.

=== Jacksonville Jaguars ===
On January 22, 2016, Bullocks was announced as the assistant defensive backs coach with the Jacksonville Jaguars of the National Football League.

=== San Francisco 49ers ===
In 2017 Bullocks became the 49ers assistant defensive backs coach a position he would hold for two years. In 2019 Bullocks was promoted to the safeties coach for the 49ers.

=== Green Bay Packers ===
On February 2, 2026, it was announced that Bullocks had joined the staff of the Green Bay Packers. He was given the title of cornerbacks coach on March 19.

== Personal life ==
Bullocks is the identical twin brother of Josh Bullocks, also a safety at Nebraska, who was selected in the second round of the 2005 NFL draft by the New Orleans Saints. Daniel and his wife Vanessa have 4 children.
