= Pee-Chee folder =

American stationery item

Folder front

Folder back

The Pee-Chee All Season Portfolio is an American stationery item that achieved popularity in the second half of the 20th century. It is commonly used by students for storing school sheets. The folder, which was originally produced solely in a peach-yellow tone, was first manufactured in 1943 by the Western Tablet and Stationery Company of Kalamazoo, Michigan. Pee-Chees were later produced by the MeadWestvaco Corporation.

== History ==
These inexpensive folders are made of card stock with two internal pockets for the storage of loose leaf paper. The pockets are printed with a variety of reference information including factors for converting between English and metric measurement units, and a multiplication table. The folders had fallen out of general use by the 2000s, but are available from Mead as of 2014.

The illustrations usually depict high school-age students engaged in sports or other activities. Artist Francis Golden, best known for watercolors of fishing and hunting, drew the illustrations starting in 1964. It became popular for students to deface these figures, often with scurrilous doodles and thought balloons.

The major difference between Pee-Chees and other paper folders is the inside pockets. Pee-Chees have pockets located at the sides, not the bottom, which prevents the contents from falling out if the folder is inadvertently stored upside down.

Pee-Chees are named after the original peach color upon release; the folders now are made in five colors as "Color Talk Pee-Chee Folders" with an updated design, and a blue highlight replacing the original brown. The original color remains the most popular by far.

== Pee-Chee today ==
The retro Pee-Chee illustrations are now used to add a nostalgic flair to new products, such as T-shirts and iPad cases. The indie duo She & Him (which consists of Zooey Deschanel and M. Ward) produced official merchandise using classic Pee Chee designs.

Artist Patrick Martinez has created a number of paintings in the Pee-Chee folder style, but with scenes of police brutality and familiar events such as the 2015 Texas pool party incident, the death of Sandra Bland, the death of Eric Garner and others. He says he was initially inspired in 2005 by the realization that many American middle and high schools now have police patrolling hallways and classrooms.

In Stranger Things, Nancy Wheeler carries her Pee Chee folder around in the first season and multiple Hawkins Middle School students are shown carrying the Pee Chee folders in the second season. It can also be seen in Mixed-ish.

== See also ==
- Trapper Keeper
