= Andy Berke =

American politician (born 1968)

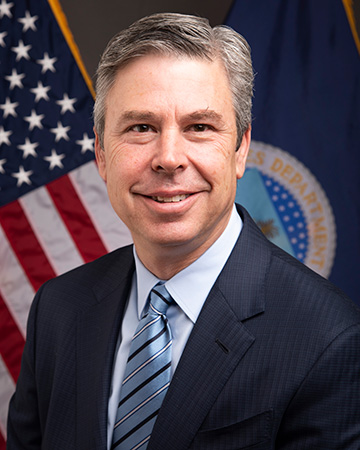

Administrator of the Rural Utilities Service
- Incumbent
- Assumed office October 6, 2022
- Preceded by: Kenneth Johnson

73rd Mayor of Chattanooga
- In office April 15, 2013 – April 19, 2021
- Preceded by: Ron Littlefield
- Succeeded by: Tim Kelly

Member of the Tennessee Senate from the 10th district
- In office 2007–2012
- Preceded by: Ward Crutchfield
- Succeeded by: Todd Gardenhire

Personal details
- Born: Andrew Lawrence Berke; March 31, 1968 (age 58) Chattanooga, Tennessee, U.S.
- Party: Democratic
- Spouse: Monique Prado
- Education: Stanford University (BA); University of Chicago (JD)

Andrew Lawrence Berke (born March 31, 1968) is an American attorney and politician from Tennessee. He served as the mayor of Chattanooga from 2013 to 2021. A member of the Democratic Party, he represented Hamilton and Marion counties in the 10th district as a state senator from 2007 to 2012. On March 5, 2013, he became Chattanooga's mayor-elect, winning more than 72% of the vote, and he was inaugurated on April 15, 2013. Berke was re-elected on March 7, 2017, and served until April 19, 2021, when he was succeeded by Tim Kelly. On October 6, 2022, President Joe Biden appointed Berke to serve as administrator of the Rural Utilities Service at the U.S. Department of Agriculture (USDA).

== Early life and education ==
Berke was born in Chattanooga, Tennessee, to Marvin and Kandy Berke. He has one sister, Julie. He attended Rivermont Elementary and Baylor School in Chattanooga, where he was a standout tennis player, and Stanford University, where he met his wife, Monique. He lives in Chattanooga with his wife and their two daughters. He is Jewish.

After graduating from Stanford with honors, Berke worked as a legislative assistant for U.S. Representative Bart Gordon. After graduating from the University of Chicago Law School, he worked as a clerk for Judge Deanell Reece Tacha of the United States Court of Appeals for the Tenth Circuit in Lawrence, Kansas. During this time he also taught at the University of Kansas School of Law as an adjunct professor.

Berke returned home to Chattanooga and was admitted to the Tennessee Bar in 1994. He joined his family law practice, Berke, Berke, and Berke in Chattanooga, which was founded in 1934 by his grandfather Harry Berke.

== Public office ==
=== State Senate ===
Berke entered a 2007 special election to replace longtime state senator Ward Crutchfield and defeated Republican Oscar Brock, son of former U.S. Senator Bill Brock, 63% to 37%. He was sworn into the Tennessee Senate on November 21, 2007. During the 105th General Assembly, Berke served as secretary of the Senate Education Committee and as a member of the Senate Transportation Committee.

Berke was reelected in 2008, defeating Republican Oscar Brown. He received over 70% of the vote. As a member of the 106th General Assembly, Berke served as secretary of the Senate Education Committee and as a member of the Senate Transportation committee. On November 24, 2008, Berke was elected secretary and treasurer of the Senate Democratic Caucus.

=== Chattanooga mayoral campaign ===
On May 8, 2012, Berke announced his candidacy for Mayor of Chattanooga. He became mayor-elect on March 5, 2013, after receiving 72% of the vote.

=== First mayoral term ===
Within a month of taking office, Berke reorganized city government, merging the Departments of Parks and Recreation and Human Services into a new Department of Youth and Family Development, the Departments of Neighborhood Services and Community Development into a new Department of Economic and Community Development, eliminating the Department of Education, Arts, and Culture, and creating a new Department of Transportation to handle transportation matters once handled by the Department of Public Works. In his first year as mayor, he formed a task force to reform the City of Chattanooga Police and Fire Pension and overhauled the Pension Plan, saving taxpayers over $227 million while preserving benefits for first responders.

During Berke's first term, Chattanooga's unemployment rate fell from a June 2011 high of 9.5% to 4.1% in May 2016, a nine-year low, and the city created over 8,000 new jobs. On July 14, 2014, Berke joined other local and state officials to announce that the Volkswagen Crossblue would be manufactured in Chattanooga, resulting in over 2,000 new jobs for residents. In addition to a boom of manufacturing jobs, Chattanooga's 10 Gigabit fiber optic infrastructure helped fuel wage growth, resulting in the country's third-fastest wage growth for medium-sized metro areas.

On January 14, 2015, Berke established an Innovation District, making Chattanooga the first midsized city with an innovation district. Since then, Chattanooga's Innovation District has been a catalyst for change downtown, resulting in $700 million in new retail, office and residential space, and 868 new business licenses issued in 2016 alone.

Under Berke, Chattanooga has received national recognition for its work in digital equity. A new program called Tech Goes Home, modeled after an award-winning program in Boston, ensures equal access to technology by offering technology training, skills, and access to families. In his 2015 State of the City Address, Berke also announced a new partnership with Chattanooga's Electric Power Board (EPB) to offer discounted high-speed internet access to students on free and reduced lunch through a program called NetBridge.

Six months after the launch of the Innovation District, four Marines and a sailor were killed during a terror-inspired attack in Chattanooga. In the following hours, Berke called the incident a "nightmare for the city of Chattanooga" and pledged all available resources to aid the FBI in its investigation. Because of his leadership during and following the attack, he was invited to lead the U.S. delegation at the first annual Strong Cities Network Global Summit held in Antalya, Turkey, on May 11, 2016.

The creation of an Innovation District and his response to the July 16 attack were both cited as factors in Berke's recognition as American City & County's 2015 Municipal Leader of the Year. On December 15, 2015, OZY.com recognized Berke as a Rising Star, citing Chattanooga's technology boom as the major factor in the city's turnaround.

In 2016, Berke announced new efforts to combat violence, including investments in public safety technology and a new Citizen Safety Coalition, a new Office of Early learning, a partnership with United Way to offer early learning scholarships, and a Family Friendly Workplace challenge to get more businesses to adopt policies making their business more friendly for working parents. He also announced new investments in neighborhoods, including $6 million for a new Youth and Family Development center in Avondale, $887,000 for a new park at the former Charles A Bell School site in Alton Park, $1.5 million for the cleanup of the old Dixie Yarn Mill in Lupton City, completed $2 million in upgrades of the Wilcox Tunnel in East Chattanooga, and the construction of a new Miller Park District as the gateway to the MLK Neighborhood.

=== Mayoral re-election campaign ===
On September 6, 2016, Berke announced his bid for re-election to a second term as mayor. His announcement focused on combating gun violence, enhancing workforce development, and expanding the city's focus on early childhood education. Berke was easily re-elected, defeating three challengers.

=== Second mayoral term ===
Berke was sworn in to his second term on April 18, 2017. During his second term, he has continued many of the investments that marked his first four years in office, including renewed commitments to early childcare, violence reduction, affordable housing, digital equity, and economic development.

On September 23, 2019, Berke stood alongside Hamilton County Mayor Jim Coppinger and other officials to announce "East Chattanooga Rising," an initiative to convert the former Harriet Tubman Homes site into a mixed-use development anchored by an automotive paint manufacturing facility. The project is expected to generate 150 jobs in one of Chattanooga's highest-poverty ZIP codes, which had not seen any economic development for more than a century. The city's commitment to small businesses also increased with the launch of the Neighborhood Reinvestment Fund, intended to help neighborhood-based lifestyle businesses obtain financing for minor improvements, marketing, and other expenses, as well as the local launch of Kiva, a micro-loan program to provide start-up capital to entrepreneurs. The downtown Innovation District was highlighted repeatedly throughout Berke's second term, with national exposure coming from Revolution's Rise of the Rest tour and Project For Public Spaces' International Placemaking Week.

As part of the city's Fiscal Year 2019 budget, Berke committed $5 million to the community's first Affordable Housing Trust Fund to combat the trend of local home prices and rents rising faster than wages. As of January 2020, the City was praised by Built for Zero, a movement of more than 80 cities and counties across the country working to measurably end homelessness, for having effectively reached net zero homelessness among its veteran population.

The Berke administration's widely praised response to the July 16 terror attack earned him the attention of the Strong Cities Network, a "global network of mayors, municipal-level policy makers and practitioners united in building social cohesion and community resilience to counter violent extremism in all its forms." Berke was invited to speak to the SCN multiple times and was involved with the 2018 launch of its Public-Private Partnership Task Force Against Hate in conjunction with the German Marshall Fund. In April 2019, he announced the formation of a Chattanooga Council Against Hate to combat extremism and bias-motivated violence at a metropolitan level. Following local protests after the murders of Ahmaud Arbery and George Floyd, and the shooting of Breonna Taylor, Berke announced the formation of a new Office of Community Resilience to help law enforcement officials, social workers, and criminal justice reform advocates co-create new solutions for responding to people in crisis. The Chattanooga Police Department also earned national recognition for launching the Policing & Racial Equity Dashboard, an open-data tool that displays closed investigations, including citations, arrests, use of force, and citizen complaints by race.

The Mayor's Youth Council, a group of highly motivated young adults in their junior or senior years of high school, also became heavily involved with violence reduction, focusing particularly on generating new policies and ideas to curb the prevalence of gun violence in their community. In Berke's second term, the Youth Council also became heavily involved in issues of boosting voter turnout and improving environmental sustainability.

In 2018, Berke charged the Office of Early Learning with adding 1,000 high-quality "seats", or accessible, affordable spots for children who needed them, before the conclusion of his second term. As of January 2020, the Office was well on its way to that goal, having added 916 seats throughout the city.

Berke's second term has also seen the completion of several landmark capital projects, including the $10 million renovation of Miller Park in downtown Chattanooga, the construction of a new Youth & Family Development Center in the Avondale neighborhood, and the $6 million renovation of East Lake Park. Other significant projects, including the renovation of Walnut Plaza and the construction of the Ed Johnson Memorial Project commenced during Berke's second term. The Ed Johnson Memorial Project was arguably the most significant undertaking of Public Art Chattanooga, a 501c3 nonprofit organization administered by the City of Chattanooga and the Public Art Commission to support public art projects throughout the city. PAC's strategic plan, CHA Creates, was passed by the Chattanooga City Council in February 2019 and included the city's first "percent for art" policy to ensure continued long-term funding for public art projects and maintenance.

=== COVID-19 pandemic response ===
In response to growing concerns about the spread of COVID-19 in the United States, Berke signed an executive order declaring a state of emergency in Chattanooga on March 13, 2020, the same day the first case of the virus was reported in Hamilton County. Over the remainder of the year, Berke signed 45 more executive orders extending the state of emergency and authorizing additional steps to slow the virus's spread. The Berke administration also launched programs to connect homebound senior citizens with health resources, support struggling small businesses and improve community testing, and focus on meeting the unique needs of Chattanooga's Spanish-speaking and Black populations throughout the spring, summer, and fall of 2020. When the Pfizer and Moderna vaccines had secured emergency authorization, Berke's office announced "Get Ready! It's Up To You, It's Up To Us," a multimedia campaign to equip the community with information and resources about getting vaccinated.

In January 2021, Berke's office honored the hundreds of lives lost to the virus with COVID-19 Memorial Project, a website that invites community members to publicly share photos, stories, and words of inspiration about their lost loved ones.

=== The National Telecommunications and Information Administration ===
On February 2, 2022, the National Telecommunications and Information Administration named Berke a Special Representative for Broadband. In this capacity, he will direct $48 billion in resources from the Infrastructure Investment and Jobs Act to expand high-speed broadband service to states, municipalities, and tribal lands throughout the country.

== Other work ==
Berke serves on the board of advisors for Let America Vote, an organization founded by former Missouri Secretary of State Jason Kander that aims to end voter suppression and is an advisory board member of Communities Overcoming Extremism: The After Charlottesville Project, formed in the aftermath of the August 2017 attacks in Charlottesville, Virginia. He is also a member of NewDEAL Leaders, a coalition of "pro-growth progressive state and local elected officials who champion ideas to grow the economy, expand opportunity for all, and make government work better." From 2018 to 2020, Berke served as co-chair of the National League of Cities Council on Youth, Education and Families.

Political offices
Preceded by Ron Littlefield	Mayor of Chattanooga; 2013–2021	Succeeded by Tim Kelly
