= Milo Smith =

American physician

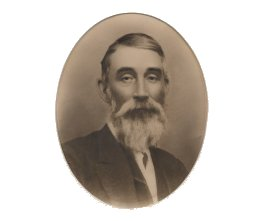

Mayor of Chattanooga
- In office 1862–1863
- Preceded by: James Cartwright Warner
- Succeeded by: Military Occupation (1863–1865); Richard Henderson (1865)
- In office 1850–1852
- Preceded by: Thomas Crutchfield Sr.
- Succeeded by: Henry White Massengale
- In office 1842–1844
- Preceded by: Beriah Frazier
- Succeeded by: Joseph Strong Gillespie

Personal details
- Born: 1807 Dayton, Tennessee
- Died: September 25, 1869 (aged 61–62)

Milo Smith (1807 – 25 September 1869) was an American medical doctor and owner of the leading medical practice in the early days of Chattanooga, Tennessee, who served as mayor of the city in three different decades.

He was born at Smith's Cross Roads, now Dayton, Tennessee, in 1807, by William Smith and Elizibeth Cozby. Dr. Milo Smith attended the Philadelphia Medical School where he studied medicine and earned his M.D. He later went on to marry Caroline Lipscomb, daughter of Spotswood and Elizabeth Smith Pendleton Lipscomb, of Grainger County, Tennessee, on July 20, 1833, in Athens, Tennessee. Their daughter, Elizibeth Nisbet Smith, was the first white child born in the city of Chattanooga after its naming and their son, William Spotswood Smith, attended the medical school in Nashville and later worked on the medical staff for Dr. Samuel H. Stout in the Confederate Army. Smith was elected mayor of Chattanooga in 1842 and then again in 1843, making him the first mayor to ever serve two terms both consecutively and all together. He served as mayor again in from 1862 and 1863 until his office was abrogated by the Union Army during the occupation of Chattanooga. In total, Smith was served as mayor for seven individual terms; however, each was only a year long.

== Political career ==
From the year 1839 to 1851, the mayors of Chattanooga were elected, not directly by the people, but instead by a group of elected aldermen who then chose one from amongst themselves to be given the title of mayor. Dr. Milo Smith was awarded the title for the two consecutive years of 1844 and 1845 and was elected again for the consecutive years of 1850-1851. Dr. Smith was elected for a third consecutive year in 1852 when Chattanooga became incorporated and the mayoral elections were decided by popular citizen vote, making Smith the first mayor of the City of Chattanooga rather than the town. Known as the "War Mayor," Smith was elected to office again in 1862 and 1863 after which, on September 9, 1863, Smith turned over his office to the first Federal Army unit to enter the city as all public offices were abrogated. During the war, especially during the siege of Chattanooga, Dr. Smith was renowned in the city for giving medical aid to Confederate soldiers and their families, as well as Union soldiers when the opportunity arose. This practice mimicked how he ran his personal medical practice before and after the war.

== Medical practice ==
Smith was one of Chattanooga's earliest medical physicians, having owned and operated a practice from as early as 1832 to the time of his death in 1869, as well as one of the few physicians to maintain a practice before the Civil War. He was widely considered a very kind man throughout the city due to his persistence to give free medical care. He rarely took payment unless in dire financial need, in which it is said that it caused him great embarrassment. Smith's charitable demeanor made him very popular among the people and likely contributed to his being elected to the mayor's office so frequently.

He died of gastroenteritis in September 1869 in Chattanooga, age 61.
