= Austin Letheridge Bender =

American mayor (1916–1980)

Mayor of Chattanooga
- In office January 1, 1969 – January 26, 1971
- Preceded by: Ralph Kelley
- Succeeded by: S. Dean Peterson

Personal details
- Born: June 6, 1916 Chattanooga, Tennessee, US
- Died: August 28, 1980 (aged 64)
- Party: Democratic Party
- Spouse: Rozelle Kelso (m. 1938)
- Children: 3
- Military career
- Allegiance: United States of America
- Branch: Army
- Rank: Captain
- Conflicts: World War II

A. L. “Chunk” Bender (June 6, 1916 – August 28, 1980) was the mayor of the City of Chattanooga, Tennessee from 1969 to 1971 after serving as Commissioner for many years. Due to health problems he declined a re-election bid. While the office of mayor in Chattanooga is officially non-partisan, he was a member of the Democratic Party.

== Biography ==
Bender was born in 1916 in Chattanooga, the youngest of 14 children. In 1938 he married Rozelle Kelso (1916-2012) from Fayetteville, Tennessee. He served in the United States Army during World War II and attained the rank of captain. He saw action in the Pacific. While he was at war, his first daughter, Patricia Ann, was born. Two years later his second daughter Frances Kelso was born. Nine years after Frances' birth, the couple had another son, George Andrew.

Commissioner of Public Works and Vice-Mayor A.L. Bender assumed the office of Mayor on January 1, 1969, upon the resignation of Mayor Ralph Kelley. Following four years of service during World War II, Bender returned to Chattanooga and became superintendent of city parks, a position he maintained until an unsuccessful bid for the county commission in 1955. In 1958, County Judge Wilkes Thrasher brought Bender back into public service by appointing him county manager. Upon the death of Public Works Commissioner Pat Wilcox in 1962, Bender was appointed to finish the term. Commissioner Bender ran successfully for a full term in 1963 and was re-elected in 1967 without opposition. Commissioner Bender received the largest percentage of votes among the other commissioners, and thus he became vice-mayor under Mayor Ralph Kelley.

On December 3, 1968, Mayor Kelly announced his resignation, passing the office of Mayor to “Chunk” Bender effective January 1, 1969. Due to ailing health and on his doctor's advice, Mayor Bender resigned from office on January 26, 1971.

Bender's health suffered for several years and prevented his continuing in local politics, though he was close to Estes Kefauver and his campaign. In 1980 he died from congestive heart failure. His family continues to live in Chattanooga and the surrounding areas.

The rose garden in Chattanooga's Warner Park is a testament to his time as Commissioner of Parks.
