= Underground Chattanooga =

Flood prevention in Tennessee, US

Coordinates: 35.05°N 85.31°W

Underground Chattanooga is a below-ground area of Chattanooga, Tennessee that resulted from citizen efforts to prevent floods in the aftermath of the flood of 1867. It was rediscovered by Jeff Brown in the 1970s.

== Flooding ==
During the nineteenth and early twentieth centuries, Chattanooga experienced bouts of systematic flooding roughly every decade. The impact of flooding was severe; it affected many of Chattanooga's manufacturers as well as the merchants in the area. Building damage was frequent as well as the interruption of daily life. Chattanooga's commerce was constantly affected by the flooding, After years of suffering through flooding, in March 1867 Chattanooga experienced a record flood following four days of heavy rainfall. The river had risen 53 feet (16 m), which was 15.5 feet higher than a flood twenty years earlier. The rain lasted for four days, bringing the water level in the Tennessee River 28 feet above flood range. The bridge across the river was destroyed, as were many buildings. There was a considerable loss of life and looting took place. Upwards of 4,000 homeless in Chattanooga were ferried out of the flooding city to areas of higher ground. During a 64-year span ranging from 1875 to 1938, the Tennessee River had risen above its flood range more than 70 times.

== Construction ==
The concept of adding levees were briefly discussed among the residents of Chattanooga. However, the waterfront areas were deemed too valuable as a commercial resource to use for the construction of a levee. After the bouts of flooding, a local newspaper article was released that stated the city's leaders planned on raising the grade of the streets of Chattanooga so that they would no longer flood. The people of Chattanooga began to raise the level of a few of the city's streets by 3 to 15 feet. Around 40 blocks of downtown Chattanooga were raised. Market and Broad Streets were completely filled, as well as portions of Cherry and Chestnut Streets. The method in which the city was raised is disputed, because there is no historical documentation. It was speculated that what was used in the raising was dirt from higher level areas of the town. Later, available records and soil boring showed that a variety of different materials such as foundry waste and sawmill scraps had been used in raising the city's streets. In 1933 the Tennessee Valley Authority in conjunction with Franklin D. Roosevelt's New Deal helped pass the Tennessee Valley Authority Act (1933) which prompted the construction of the Chickamauga Dam. After the dam was built in 1933, it helped to regulate the water levels of the Tennessee River near Chattanooga, preventing downtown from flooding.

== Discovery ==
Archaeologist and University of Tennessee-Chattanooga professor Jeff Brown started noticing small clues to the underground world while walking around downtown Chattanooga. He learned from utility workers of doorways leading to tunnels and rooms or nowhere altogether. Entire basements of buildings were once first floors, including some obvious storefronts complete with windows. None were marked on maps and no one could tell him why these features were there. He discovered that much of the city had been backfilled, by six feet at 9th Street and up to 20 feet at other places, but very little documentation of this process existed.

== Controversy ==
Because of lack of historical documentation backing up the raising of the city's streets, some suggest that it is just a legend. Some suggest that it was a common practice for the basements in buildings downtown to have stairs leading down from the street. These walk-downs, some complete with handrails leading down towards a basement entrance, existed in downtown Chattanooga at the time. The basements had windows to provide light as well as ventilation. There has been some photo documentation of structures over a span of thirty years that show little or no change. An explanation for the archways in some buildings could be explained by being used as support for the building. Some suggest that the only evidence is that of a normal growing city infrastructure and, no monumental effort to raise the city's streets. After 1925, the use of commercial basements began to fade. Over time parts of the city began to be filled in that fell below grade.
