= Charles A. Rose =

American politician and mayor of Chattanooga (1930–2022)

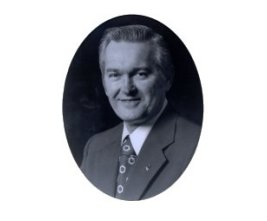

Mayor of Chattanooga
- In office 1975–1983
- Preceded by: Robert Kirk Walker
- Succeeded by: Gene Roberts

Personal details
- Born: October 5, 1930 Orlando, Florida
- Died: May 30, 2022 (aged 91) Chattanooga, Tennessee
- Resting place: Chattanooga National Cemetery
- Spouse: Martha Carolyn McKelvey

Charles Allen "Pat" Rose (October 5, 1930 – May 30, 2022) was an American politician, who served as mayor of Chattanooga, Tennessee, from 1975 to 1983.

Rose began working for the city of Chattanooga in 1964 as an assistant traffic engineer. He was appointed acting Public Works Commissioner in 1969, won his first term as commissioner in 1971, and was elected mayor in 1975.

Rose was born in Orlando, Florida, and was married to Martha Carolyn (McKelvey) Rose from 1950 until her death in January 2022. Rose died on May 30, 2022. They had four children.

== See also ==
- List of mayors of Chattanooga, Tennessee
