= Abraham Ellison Garrett =

American politician (1830–1907)

Member of the U.S. House of Representatives from Tennessee's 3rd district
- In office March 4, 1871 – March 3, 1873
- Preceded by: William B. Stokes
- Succeeded by: William Crutchfield

Member of the Tennessee House of Representatives
- In office 1865-1866

Personal details
- Born: March 6, 1830 Overton County, Tennessee, U.S.
- Died: February 14, 1907 (aged 76) Carthage, Tennessee, U.S.
- Party: Democratic
- Spouses: Adelicia Taylor Hayes Garrett (1841 - 1927); Louisa Greer Garrett (1835 - 1877)
- Children: Addison Mcdonald Garrett; Ellison Mcdonald Garrett; Addie Mcdonald Garrett; Issac Greer Garrett; Sarah Garrett; Augusta E. Garrett; Stephen Garrett; Clarence Garrett; Belle Garrett; Louisa Garrett
- Education: Poplar Springs College, Kentucky
- Profession: lawyer; farmer; soldier; politician

Abraham Ellison Garrett (March 6, 1830 – February 14, 1907) was an American politician and a member of the United States House of Representatives from Tennessee.

== Biography ==
Garrett was born near Livingston, Overton County, Tennessee, on March 6, 1830, son of Stephen and Sarah Flowers Garrett. He attended the public schools and Poplar Springs College, Kentucky. He studied law and was admitted to the bar and commenced practice in Livingston, Tennessee. He also engaged in agricultural pursuits. He married Adelicia Taylor Hayes and had 3 children, Addison Mcdonald, Ellison Mcdonald, and Addie Mcdonald. His second wife was Louisa Greer and with her he had 7 children, Issac Greer, Sarah, Augusta E., Stephen, Clarence, Belle, and Louisa.

== Military service ==
Garrett served as a lieutenant colonel of the First Regiment, Tennessee Mounted Infantry, in the Union Army during the Civil War.

Garrett served in the 1st Tennessee Mounted Infantry Regiment, U.S.A. Recruiting for this regiment was begun October 1863, and two companies had been mustered into service by the end of 1863; other companies were added during 1864, the last one on November 30, 1864. Garrett was promoted from major to lieutenant colonel on March 18, 1864. The companies were organized at Nashville and at Carthage, and did duty in the District of Middle Tennessee, Department of the Cumberland, until April 1865, when the regiment was assigned to the 1st Brigade, 1st Subdistrict, District of Middle Tennessee.

== Political career ==
Garrett was a delegate to the State constitutional convention in 1865. He served as a member of the Tennessee House of Representatives in 1865 and 1866. Elected as a Democrat to the Forty-second Congress, he served from March 4, 1871, to March 3, 1873. An unsuccessful candidate for reelection in 1872, he then resumed the practice of law in Carthage, Tennessee.

== Death ==
Garrett died on February 14, 1907 (age 76 years, 345 days) and is interred at Carthage Cemetery, Carthage, Tennessee.

U.S. House of Representatives
Preceded by William B. Stokes	Member of the U.S. House of Representatives from Tennessee's 3rd congressional district 1871–1873	Succeeded by William Crutchfield
