= Hixson High School =

Location
- 5705 Middle Valley Road; Hixson, Tennessee 37343; United States; 35.154°N 85.222°W

Information
- Type: Public
- Established: 1909
- School district: Hamilton County Schools
- Principal: LeAngela Rogers
- Teaching staff: 57.81 (FTE)
- Grades: 9 to 12
- Enrollment: 920 (2024-2025)
- Student to teacher ratio: 15.34
- Colors: Black and gold
- Athletics conference: TSSAA
- Nickname: Wildcats
- Website: https://hhs.hcde.org/

Hixson High School is a public high school for grades 9–12 in the Hamilton County Schools system located in Hixson, a suburb of Chattanooga, Tennessee, United States.

== History ==
Hixson High School was founded in 1909. Its current site opened in 1966. It has been accredited by the Southern Association of Colleges and Schools since 1959.The school had only grades 10-12 until fall 1993, when it welcomed its first freshman class.

=== School honors ===
In 1984, Hixson High was awarded the Carnegie Award for School Excellence and was recognized as one of the top six high schools in Tennessee. In 1984 and 1985, the U.S. Department of Education recognized Hixson as a National School of Excellence.

== Campus ==
Overcrowding at the former site of Hixson High resulted in plans being made, beginning in 1964, for a new school facility. The new school building, two miles from the old school site, was dedicated in 1966. A two-story wing to the school for the mathematics, music and foreign language departments was added in 1986. Ground was broken in 1992 for another addition which includes classrooms, chemistry laboratories, home economics laboratories, a student publication room, teacher work areas, locker space, and an expanded music department. In 1977, Hixson Community Stadium was dedicated at the new school, the result of a community effort to move the football team's home games from the former school location.

=== Athletics facilities ===
Hixson's football team plays at Hixson Community Stadium/Anthony Martino Field and has a separate practice field. The stadium has a six-lane all-weather track. Hixson's baseball facility is John Plumlee Stadium. The soccer teams play at Bob Martin Field. A new softball stadium opened in 2006. The soccer and softball facilities share a concessions/restrooms building that opened in 2011. The tennis teams train and play home matches at a new on-campus facility built in 2019. Hixson plays home golf matches at Hixson's Valleybrook Golf Club. The bowling teams use Spare Time Hixson lanes for home competitions. Hixson's gymnasium, the school's oldest sports facility (original to the building opened in 1966), is used by the basketball, wrestling and volleyball teams. The school also has a wrestling practice room. All Hixson athletes have access to the Bullocks Strength Complex, which opened in 2007.

== Sports ==
Hixson High School competes in the Tennessee Secondary School Athletic Association (TSSAA). Hixson has won team state championships in wrestling (1973, 2009, 2010 and 2014), softball (1983, 1984, 1987 and 1988), boys' soccer (1988), boys' (2004) and girls' (1985) golf and boys' (2007) and girls' (2006) bowling.

== Notable alumni ==
- Daniel Bullocks 2001, professional American football player
- Josh Bullocks 2001, professional American football player
- Kim Criswell, singer, actress
- Michael Houser, lead guitarist, Widespread Panic
- Guy A. Lewis, attorney
- Kelley Lovelace, songwriter
- Greg Martin, Tennessee state representative
- Scott Ourth 1977, Iowa state representative
- Danny Shirley, 1974, lead singer, Confederate Railroad
- Robin Tucker Smith 1981, Tennessee state representative
- Don Stephenson, 1982, actor, director
- Kim Hudson White, 1978, president/CEO, River City Company
- Wayne White, 1975, artist

== Notable faculty ==
- Chip Kell, head football coach
