= Richard Henderson (mayor) =

American attorney and politician (1815–1878)

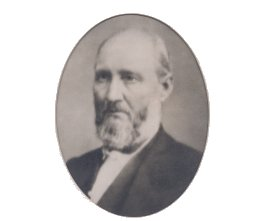

Mayor of Chattanooga
- In office October 7, 1865 – December 28, 1865
- Preceded by: Milo Smith (1862–1863); Military occupation (1863–1865)
- Succeeded by: Charles E. Lewis

Personal details
- Born: 1815 Warren County, Tennessee
- Died: June 11, 1878 (aged 62–63)

Richard Henderson (1815 – June 11, 1878) was an anti-secessionist attorney who served as the first post-Civil War mayor of Chattanooga, Tennessee.

== Biography ==
Henderson was born in Warren County, Tennessee in 1815. After pursuing a legal career, he moved to Chattanooga in 1840 where he founded his own law office. He was against the secession of the South prior to the Civil War and, during the Union Army's occupation of Chattanooga, he worked with its commanders to administer the city.

After the war, the city was returned to civilian control. An election was ordered for October 7, 1865, although no citizens who supported secession or aided the Confederate government were allowed to vote or run for office. Henderson was elected mayor and spent the remainder of his term re-drafting all city ordinances to conform to a new post-Slavery world. He served until December 28, 1865, when Charles Lewis was elected, the first full-term mayor of the city after the Civil War. He died on June 11, 1878.
