= Stars Earn Stripes =

NBC reality television series (2012)

- Genre: Reality
- Created by: Dick Wolf; Mark Burnett; David Hurwitz
- Presented by: Samantha Harris; Wesley Clark
- Country of origin: United States
- Original language: English
- No. of seasons: 1
- No. of episodes: 4

Production
- Executive producers: Dick Wolf; Mark Burnett; David A. Hurwitz
- Running time: 60–120 minutes
- Production companies: Universal Television; One Three Media; Wolf Reality LLC; Bill's Market & Television Productions

Original release
- Network: NBC
- Release: August 13 – September 3, 2012

Stars Earn Stripes is a reality television program that aired for one season on NBC beginning August 13, 2012. Produced by Mark Burnett, the series follows a group of celebrities, accompanied by current and former members of the United States Armed Forces and law enforcement, competing in various challenges for charity based on training exercises used by the U.S. military. The series is hosted by retired NATO Supreme Allied Commander and former presidential candidate Wesley Clark and former Dancing with the Stars co-host Samantha Harris. The title is a reference to how the stars would earn stripes on their uniforms when they advanced to the next round of the competition.

== Participants ==
The cast of Stars Earn Stripes was unveiled by NBC in June 2012. Each celebrity will represent various military and veterans charities, and their winnings will be donated to these charities.

- Dean Cain – Actor, playing for Wounded Warrior Project
- Dolvett Quince – Trainer for The Biggest Loser, playing for Got Your Six
- Eve Torres – Three-time WWE Divas Champion and 2007 WWE Diva Search Winner, playing for USO
- Laila Ali – Former boxer and television host, playing for Military Child Education Coalition
- Nick Lachey – Singer and actor, playing for Badge of Honor Memorial Foundation
- Picabo Street – Winter Olympics downhill skiing medalist, playing for Hiring Our Heroes
- Terry Crews – Actor and reality TV star, playing for the Pat Tillman Foundation
- Todd Palin – Outdoorsman and former First Gentleman of Alaska, playing for Armed Services YMCA Alaska

Each celebrity was paired with a special operations or law enforcement professional who trained them in weapons and combat tactics. These "operatives" include:

- Chris Kyle (Navy SEAL) – paired with Dean Cain
- Andrew McLaren (Marine) – paired with Dolvett Quince
- Grady Powell (Green Beret) – paired with Eve Torres
- Talon Smith (Navy Corpsman) – paired with Laila Ali
- Tom Stroup (Orange County Sheriff's Office SWAT Commander) – paired with Nick Lachey
- Brent Gleeson (Navy SEAL) – paired with Picabo Street
- Dale Comstock (Delta Force) – paired with Terry Crews
- JW Cortes (MTA Police/Marine) – paired with Todd Palin

== Summary ==
Pairing of Stars and Mission One

The season started with the stars and the operatives meeting in a clearing where General Clark assigned the teams. The first mission was called Amphibious Assault where the cast members would be dropped from a helicopter. Most of the missions were completed with two teams of a star and an operative to form a squad. The first squad was Dean Cain's and Laila Ali's teams with them completing the mission in around 13:20. The second squad consisting of Todd Palin, Dolvett Quince, and their operatives started the mission, but Quince could not swim adequately enough to the raft. The Rescue Team picked Quince up and Todd completed the mission with the help of the two operatives in a time of 20:54. The third squad of Nick and Eve completed their mission in a time around 10:02. The fourth squad of Picabo Street and Terry Crews started the mission, but Crews experienced similar swimming difficulties as Quince did. Street finished the mission in a time of approximately of 17:07. Back at Mission Control, General Clark announced that Nick and Eve had the best time. Gen Clark also announced that the two stars that failed to complete the mission would compete in the elimination shootout (instead of the normal slowest squad). Dolvett Quince and Terry Crews competed in the shootout with Quince being eliminated. Quince earned a small amount for the ‘Got Your Six’ charity.

Bonus Shootout

Due to an odd number of teams, a Bonus Shootout was held where the team with the fastest time in the first mission would compete for immunity in the second mission. Eve won immunity over Nick. The second mission was called Search and Destroy. The first squad consists of Todd and Laila with a finish time of 6:26. The second squad consists of Dean and Picabo finishing with the fastest time of 4:50. The final squad of Nick and Terry finished a time slower than the mark set by Todd/Laila. Nick completed the elimination shootout faster than Terry Crews. Terry Crews received the seventh place prize for his charity – Pat Tillman Foundation.

Mission Three

The third mission was called Rapid Detonation with the first squad of Eve and Dean with the fastest time of 5:30. Picabo and Todd was the second squad finishing in 7:19. The third squad of Nick and Laila finished the slowest time of 8:55. Nick survived his second elimination shootout and Laila was eliminated in sixth place. Her charity was Military Child Education Coalition

Finale and Special Shootout

The finale consisted of two missions and a special shootout. The final five competed in a special shootout where they competed simultaneously. The first star would get to pick their Mission Four squad mates and the last person with an undamaged target would be eliminated. Dean Cain was the fastest to complete the shootout. Picabo, Todd, and Eve finished second to fourth respectively with Nick Lachey still remaining. Nick earned the fifth place prize for Badge of Honor Memorial Foundation.

Mission Four

Dean chose Eve to be his squad mate, thus Picabo and Todd were paired together. Eve and Dean completed their mission in a time of 9:43. The other squad finished with a slower time. Picabo advanced to the finals by winning the final elimination shootout. Todd earned the fourth place prize for Armed Services YMCA Alaska.

Final Mission

The final mission, Harbor Demolition, was completed only in teams of two (unlike the typical squad of two teams). Dean Cain and his operative Chris Kyle completed the final mission in a time of 6:46. Eve Torres completed in a time of 5:10, thus eliminating Dean. Picabo and her operative Brent Gleeson completed the mission in a time of 5:37. Eve received the first place prize for the USO, while Picabo and Dean earning the second and third place prize (for Hiring Our Heroes and Wounded Warrior Project) respectively.

== Mission results ==
| Celebrity | Mission One | Mission Two | Mission Three | Special Shootout | Mission Four | Final Mission |
| Airdate | 8/13/12 | 8/20/12 | 8/27/12 | 9/3/12 ^{4} | | |
| Eve Torres | 1st | Immune ^{2} | 1st | 4th | 1st | Winner |
| Picabo Street | 3rd | 1st | 2nd | 2nd | Safe-Shootout | 2nd |
| Dean Cain | 2nd | 1st | 1st | 1st | 1st | 3rd |
| Todd Palin | 4th | 2nd | 2nd | 3rd | Eliminated | Out |
| Nick Lachey | 1st | Safe-Shootout | Safe-Shootout | Eliminated ^{3} | Out | |
| Laila Ali | 2nd | 2nd | Eliminated | Out | | |
| Terry Crews | Safe-Shootout ^{1} | Eliminated | Out | | | |
| Dolvett Quince | Eliminated ^{1} | Out | | | | |

- Note: Several rounds had two celebrities team up with each other, resulting in more than one celeb placing first place. The first three missions were assigned by General Clark, where Mission Four was special shootout winner's decision. The final mission was an individual pair mission.
- ^{1}Note: During Mission One, Dolvett Quince (paired with Todd Palin) and Terry Crews (paired with Picabo) failed to complete the mission due to swimming difficulties. Both were selected for the elimination shootout instead of lowest-placing squad.
- ^{2}Note: Before Mission Two, a Bonus Shootout was held to determine who would be immune and not be assigned to the mission. The first place squad (from Mission One) of Eve Torres and Nick Lachey participated in it with Eve winning immunity.
- ^{3}Note: Before Mission Four, there was a special elimination shootout held where all five remaining celebrities will pitted against each other simultaneously. The first celebrity to knock out all four targets would be able to choose their squad partners. The last celebrity with a target up would be eliminated. Dean Cain was the first and chose Eve Torres (who placed 4th in the Special Elimination shootout) to be squad mates. Picabo Street and Todd Palin (2nd/3rd respectively) were paired up for Mission Four.
- ^{4}Note on Final Episode: There were two missions (Operation LifeLock and Harbor Demolition) shown on this date.

=== Color Key ===
Team won 1st place
Gained immunity through bonus shootout
Came in 1st in Special Shootout and picked Mission Four's squad mate
Safe during shootout
Eliminated during shootout
Eliminated in a previous episode

== Reception ==
=== Allegations concerning Jack Osbourne ===
On August 6, 2012, Sharon Osbourne announced that she would be leaving fellow NBC program America's Got Talent due to allegations of discrimination by NBC and the producers of Stars Earn Stripes surrounding her son Jack Osbourne. On CBS's The Talk (where Sharon is also a panelist), Jack had revealed that two days before filming began, he was removed from the cast of Stars Earn Stripes after disclosing that he had been diagnosed with multiple sclerosis. Sharon felt that NBC "badly handled" the situation, and that allowing him to participate could have proved inspirational for others diagnosed with the disease. Producer David Hurwitz disputed these allegations in a press event, stating that the show was only in talks with Osbourne to participate, and that he was never officially part of the cast.

=== Calls for cancellation ===
In August, eight Nobel Peace Laureates (Desmond Tutu, Jody Williams, Mairead Maguire, Betty Williams, Jose Manuel Ramos-Horta, Adolfo Perez Esquivel, Rigoberta Menchú Tum, and Shirin Ebadi) signed an open letter calling for NBC to cancel the program. They wrote "It is our belief that this program pays homage to no one anywhere and continues and expands on an inglorious tradition of glorifying war and armed violence. Real war is down in the dirt deadly. People—military and civilians—die in ways that are anything but entertaining."

=== US Nielsen ratings ===
| No. | Title | U.S. air date | Rating | Share | Rating/share (18–49) | Viewers (millions) |
|---|---|---|---|---|---|---|
| 1 / 2 | "Amphibious Assault" | August 13, 2012 | 3.2 | 5 | 1.7/5 | 5.24 |
| 3 | "Search and Destroy" | August 20, 2012 | 2.2 | 3 | 1.2/3 | 3.62 |
| 4 | "Rapid Detonation" | August 27, 2012 | 1.8 | 3 | 1.0/3 | 3.09 |
| 5 / 6 | "Stolen Intelligence / Harbor Demolition" | September 3, 2012 | 1.7 | 3 | 0.9/2 | 2.88 |

NBC has removed Stars Earn Stripes from its list of current shows, though no formal announcement of the programs status has been made.
