= Kim White =

American businessperson

Kim H. White was president and CEO of River City Company in Chattanooga, Tennessee. River City Company is a non-profit organization created in 1986 to aid in the redevelopment and revitalization of downtown Chattanooga. White has been with River City since 2009. Before that, she was president and CEO of the Corker Group (formerly owned by Senator Bob Corker) and of Luken Holdings. White is a graduate of Hixson High School and the University of Tennessee at Chattanooga. Senator Corker praises White's work as head of River City.

The original focus of River City Company was development along the Tennessee River. River City developed the city's Riverwalk and was a partner in the development of the Tennessee Aquarium. But White has shifted the organization's efforts to increasing retail and residential development in the downtown area. River City has helped to attract more than $2 billion in private investment since 1992 to develop Chattanooga's downtown and riverfront areas. In April 2020, she stepped down from her position with many in the local community speculating her potential bid to run in an upcoming mayoral race.

White has served on the boards of Erlanger Hospital, Chattanooga Area Chamber of Commerce, the University of Chattanooga Foundation, the University of Tennessee Foundation, and is past president of the University of Tennessee at Chattanooga Alumni Board. She was named a Woman of Distinction by the American Red Cross in 2008.

She was President (2009) and Vice President (1992) of the alumni association of the University of Tennessee at Chattanooga.

She announced her candidacy for mayor of Chattanooga on September 10, 2020. She lost to Tim Kelly.

She became the vice chancellor for development and alumni affairs - and executive director of the University of Chattanooga Foundation in January 2022.
