= E. Bryant Crutchfield =

American executive (1937–2022)

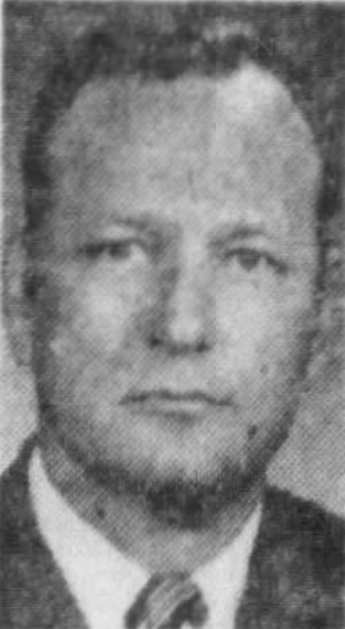
- Crutchfield in 1972
- Born: Ernest Bryant Crutchfield; February 5, 1937; Greenville, Alabama, U.S.
- Died: August 21, 2022 (aged 85); Marietta, Georgia, U.S.
- Education: Auburn University
- Occupation: Executive
- Spouse: Virginia Crutchfield
- Children: 2

Ernest Bryant "Crutch" Crutchfield (February 5, 1937 – August 21, 2022), was an American executive. He was perhaps best known for his invention of the "Trapper Keeper", a type of loose-leaf ring binder geared to students.

== Life and career ==
Crutchfield was born in Greenville, Alabama, the son of Belle Griggers and Ralph Crutchfield, both workers at a cotton mill. He attended Auburn University, where he earned his degree in 1960; he was the first person in his family to attend college. Crutchfield moved to Atlanta, where he worked for the stationery manufacturer Montag, which was later bought by Mead.

In 1971, Crutchfield participated in the development of the ABC television special Good Vibrations from Central Park, which featured the Beach Boys and Carly Simon, but also included pitches for Mead's product line, in a bid to get students to start thinking about school and school supplies. He also earned in-house awards for his product developments.

Crutchfield had begun to evolve his loose-leaf ring binder "Trapper Keeper" in the 1970s, but took his time bringing it to market. It was officially released nationwide in 1981 by Mead. The company estimated that by the end of the 1980s, half of American middle and high schoolers owned one.

Crutchfield died in August 2022 of bone cancer at hospice in Marietta, Georgia, at the age of 85.
