= List of mayors of Chattanooga, Tennessee =

This is a list of mayors of Chattanooga, Tennessee. Tim Kelly has been the incumbent mayor of Chattanooga since his inauguration on April 19, 2021 at the Tivoli Theatre.

== City aldermen system (1840-1911) ==
#	Portrait	Name	Term start	Term end	Terms	Party affiliation
1		James Enfield Berry^{[a]}	January 1, 1840	December 31, 1840	1	
2		Dr. Beriah Frazier	1841		1	
3		Dr. Milo Smith (1st term)	1842	1843	2	
4		Dr. Joseph Strong Gillespie	1844	1845	2	
5		Henry White Massengale (1st term)	1846	1848	3	
6		Thomas Crutchfield Sr.	1849		1	
7		Dr. Milo Smith (3rd, 4th & 5th terms)	1850	1852	3	
8		Henry White Massengale (2nd term)	1853		1	
9		William Williams	January 1854	July 1, 1954	1/2	
10		William F. Ragsdale	July 1, 1854	December 1954	1/2	
11		Eldridge Gerry Pearl	1855		1	
12		David Claiborne McMillin	1856		1	
13		William D. Fulton	1857		1	
14		Dr. William Samuel Bell	1858		1	
15		Thomas Crutchfield Jr.	1859		1	
16		Charles Erskine Grenville	1860		1	
17		James Cartwright Warner	1861		1	
18		Dr. Milo Smith (6th & 7th terms)	1862	September 9, 1863	2	
Under direct control of the United States Army for duration of Civil War from 1863–1865

#	Portrait	Name	Term start	Term end	Terms	Party affiliation
19		Richard Henderson	October 7, 1865	December 28, 1865	1	
20		Charles E. Lewis	1866	1867	1	Republican
21		Dudley C. Carr	1867	1869	2	
22		Alonzo G. Sharpe (1st term)	1869	1870	1	Republican
23		William P. Rathburn	1870	1871	2	
24		Gen. John T. Wilder ‡	November 20, 1871	May 18, 1872	2	Republican
25		Josiah Jackson Bryan	May 18, 1872	November 25, 1872	1	
26		Dr. Eli M. Wight (1st term)	November 25, 1872	November 24, 1873	1	Republican
27		Dr. Philander D. Sims	November 24, 1873	November 23, 1874	1	Democratic
28		John W. James	November 23, 1874	November 22, 1875	1	Republican
29		Col. Tomlinson Fort, Jr.	November 22, 1875	November 20, 1876	1	Democratic
30		Dr. Eli M. Wight (2nd term)	November 20, 1876	November 20, 1877	1	Republican
31		Thomas J. Carlisle †	November 19, 1877	October 29, 1878	1	Republican
32		Andrew Jackson Gahagan (Acting)	October 29, 1878	November 25, 1878		Republican
33		Jesse Thomas Hill	November 25, 1878	November 24, 1879	1	Democratic
34		Henry Frederick Temple	November 24, 1879	November 22, 1880	1	Independent
35		John A. Hart (1st term)	November 22, 1880	November 21, 1881	1	Republican
36		Henry C. Evans	November 21, 1881	November 19, 1883	2	Republican
37		Hugh Whiteside	November 19, 1883	November 23, 1885^{[b]}	1	Democratic
38		Alonzo G. Sharpe (2nd term)	November 23, 1885	November 21, 1887	1	Republican
39		John B. Nicklin	November 21, 1887	October 14, 1889	1	Democratic
40		John A. Hart (2nd term) †	October 14, 1889	January 15, 1891	1	Republican
41		Isaac B. Merriman (Acting)	January 20, 1891	October 19, 1891	1/2	
42		Garnet Andrews	October 19, 1891	October 16, 1893	1	Democratic
43		George W. Ochs	October 16, 1893	October 18, 1897	2	Democratic
44		Edmond G. Watkins	October 18, 1897	October 16, 1899	1	Democratic
45		Joseph Wassman	October 16, 1899	October 14, 1901	1	Republican
–		Alexander W. Chambliss (1st & 2nd terms)	October 14, 1901	October 16, 1905	2	Democratic
46		William Little Frierson	October 16, 1905	October 14, 1907	1	Democratic
47		William Riley Crabtree	October 14, 1907	October 18, 1909	1	Democratic
48		Thomas C. Thompson	October 18, 1909	May 8, 1911^{[c]}	1	Democratic

== City commission system (1911-1990) ==
#	Portrait	Name (Birth–Death)	Term in office^{[c]}	Terms	Party affiliation	Election
–		Thomas C. Thompson (1860–1938)	May 8, 1911 – April 19, 1915	1	Democratic	1911
49		Jesse M. Littleton (1867–1923)	April 19, 1915 – July 14, 1919	1	Republican	1915
50		Alex W. Chambliss ‡ (1864–1947)	July 14, 1919 – October 17, 1923	3	Democratic	1919 1923
51		Richard Hardy (1868–1927)	October 17, 1923 – April 18, 1927	1	none	Acting
52		Edward D. Bass ‡ (1873–1960)	April 18, 1927 – January 10, 1947	5	Democratic	1927 1931 1935 1939 1943
53		Elijah R. Betterton (1879–1958)	January 10, 1947 – April 14, 1947	1/2	none	Acting
54		Hugh P. Wasson (1889–1958)	April 14, 1947 – April 16, 1951	1	Independent	1947
55		Peter R. Olgiati (1901–1989)	April 16, 1951 – April 15, 1963	3	none	1951 1955 1959
56		Ralph H. Kelley ‡ (1928–2004)	April 15, 1963 – January 1, 1969	11/2	none	1963 1967
57		Austin L. Bender ‡ (1916–1980)	January 1, 1969 – January 26, 1971	1/2	Democratic	Acting
58		S. Dean Peterson (1903–1986)	January 26, 1971 – April 1971	2 months	none	Acting
59		Robert K. Walker (1925–2007)	1971–1975	1	none	1971
60		Charles A. Rose (1930–2022)	1975–1983	2	none	1975 1979
61		Gene Roberts (1932–2013)	1983–1990	4	none	1983 1987

== City council system (Since 1990) ==
#	Portrait	Name (Birth–Death)	Term in office	Terms	Party affiliation	Election	Previous office
–		Gene Roberts (1932–2013)	1990–1997	4	none	1990 1993	Tennessee Commissioner of Safety (1979–1982)
62		Jon Kinsey (b. 1954)	1997–2001	1	Democratic	1997	President of Leonard Kinsey Company (1984–1996)
63		Bob Corker (b. 1952)	April 16, 2001 – April 18, 2005	1	Republican	2001	Tennessee Commissioner of Finance and Administration (1995–1996)
64		Ron Littlefield (b. 1954)	April 18, 2005 – April 15, 2013	2	Independent	2005 2009	Chairman of the City Council (1990–2001)
65		Andy Berke (b. 1968)	April 15, 2013 – April 19, 2021	2	Democratic	2013 2017	Member of the Tennessee Senate (2007–2012)
66		Tim Kelly (b. 1967)	April 19, 2021 – Incumbent	1	Independent	2021 2025	

Notes
[a] From 1840–1882, all mayors served one year terms, with several mayors elected to successive terms.
[b] From 1883–1911, all mayors served two year terms, with several mayors elected to successive terms.
[c] From 1911 to the present, most mayors have served four year terms, with several mayors elected to successive terms.

== See also ==
- Timeline of Chattanooga, Tennessee
