= Thomas Crutchfield Sr. =

American politician (1801–1850)

Mayor of Chattanooga
- In office 1849–1850
- Preceded by: Henry White Massengale
- Succeeded by: Milo Smith

Personal details
- Born: 1801 Rockbridge County, Virginia
- Died: 1850 (aged 48–49)
- Spouse: Sarah Cleage
- Children: 4 including Thomas Crutchfield Jr. and William Crutchfield

Thomas Crutchfield Sr. (1801–1850) was an American politician who served as mayor of Chattanooga, Tennessee.

== Biography ==
Crutchfield was born in Rockbridge County, Virginia and later moved to Greenville, Tennessee. He moved to Chattanooga in the 1830s during the removal and relocation of the Cherokee population. He assisted in the first survey of the city and helped to clear and layout the city's streets. He then established a brick kiln with his brother-in-law near the Tennessee River. He established one of the first hotels in the city, the Crutchfield House, directly across from the Union Depot. It quickly became a gathering place for local politicians and leaders. In 1848, he was elected mayor serving in 1849. While mayor he presided over the rapid expansion of the city and lobbied for Chattanooga to be the northern terminus of the Western and Atlantic Railroad being built Georgia. In 1850, he died while traveling to Nashville. He was succeeded by former mayor Milo Smith.

== Personal life ==
He was married to Sarah Cleage; they had four children.

His son, Thomas Crutchfield Jr. would later serve as mayor in 1859. His son, William Crutchfield represented the 3rd congressional district of Tennessee in the United States House of Representatives for one term (1873–1875).
