= Ron Littlefield =

American politician

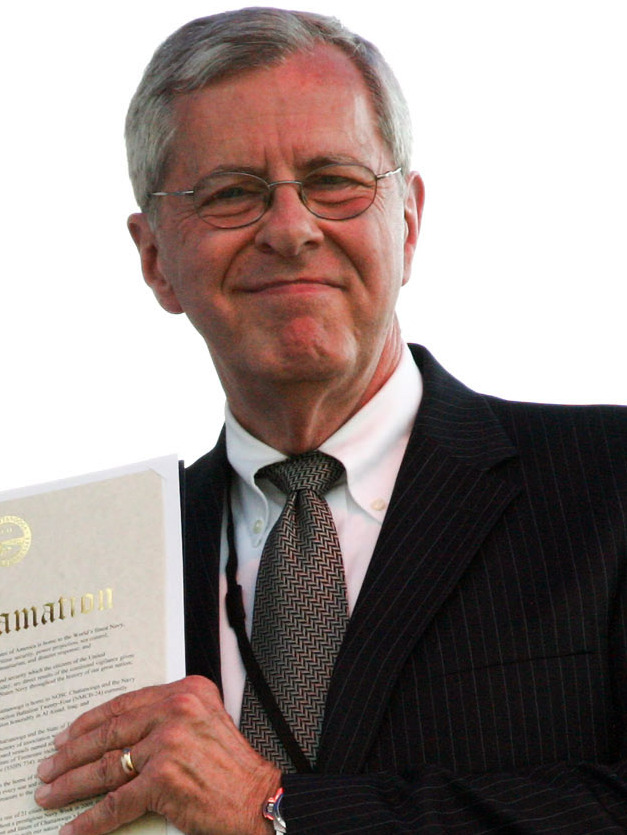

72nd Mayor of Chattanooga
- In office April 18, 2005 – April 15, 2013
- Preceded by: Bob Corker
- Succeeded by: Andy Berke

Personal details
- Born: 1946 (age 79–80)
- Party: Independent
- Spouse: Lanis
- Children: 2

Ronald C. Littlefield (born 1946) is an American politician and the former mayor of Chattanooga, Tennessee. He was elected via a run-off election in 2005 after a long term as a city councilman. He was reelected in 2009. He is the former executive director of Chattanooga Venture.

== Career ==
Littlefield graduated from LaFayette High School in Georgia in 1964 and graduated from Auburn University in 1968. Littlefield began his professional career as a city planner with the Tennessee State Planning Commission in 1970 working with suburban cities and counties around Chattanooga. His early efforts led to the adoption of Tennessee "Scenic Routes" legislation in 1971 and to some of the first environmental regulations and controls limiting signs and billboards. In the early 1970s, he worked for Research Triangle Institute under a contract with the then new US Environmental Protection Agency on studies of the health effects of air pollution in Chattanooga. In 1978 he became a charter member of the American Institute of Certified Planners. He later served as director of economic development for the City of Chattanooga – a position that ultimately led to his heading a joint economic development operation for the surrounding Hamilton County and the Chattanooga Area Chamber of Commerce. In 1982, he was selected to head Chattanooga Venture – a special purpose nonprofit organization aimed at transforming Chattanooga. At Venture he oversaw the production of Vision 2000 – one of the first comprehensive "Visioning" projects in the United States – which ultimately involved dozens of meetings and approximately 3000 local citizens. this effort is frequently cited as the turning point that led to Chattanooga's transformation. In 1986, he left Chattanooga Venture to run for local political office. In 1987, he was elected Commissioner of Public Works under the old commission form of government that was in place in Chattanooga at that time. In that office, he led an effort to reform the local government by abandoning the commission form and adopting a more modern strong mayor / council form with legislative representatives selected from single member districts. After drafting a new charter and a failed referendum to adopt that charter, the Federal Courts got involved and ordered the change to become effective in 1990. At that time, Littlefield ran for and was elected to the first city council and was further selected as the council's first chairman. Littlefield served through the first council term and then ran unsuccessfully for mayor in 1993. After several years working in the private sector and as a planning consultant for other governments, Littlefield ran successfully for his old position on the Chattanooga City Council and once again was chosen as chairman. He served out that term on the council until mounting a second and this time successful campaign for mayor in 2001 – following Bob Corker, who left after one term to run for the US Senate.

== Recall ==
As part of a national movement by conservative political organizations that affected more than 50 mayors across the United States, Ron Littlefield became the subject of a recall effort in August 2010. A petition complaining of high taxes, water quality fees and annexation was circulated and filed by Chattanooga Tea Party, the citizens group "Chattanooga Organized for Action" and "Citizens to Recall Mayor Littlefield" Littlefield filed an injunction against the Hamilton County election commission, a judge later added Jim Folkner of Citizens to Recall Mayor to the defendants to decide while attempting to decide if the recall is valid. On September 7, 2010, the recall attempt was halted in a ruling by Hamilton County Circuit Judge Jeff Hollingsworth, who cited the recall groups' failure to comply with state law on a variety of issues related to the petition language, number of dated signatures, the use of petitions not approved by the election commission and other legal and organizational missteps made by the three groups involved. As a result of the ruling, Ron Littlefield remained mayor until the end of his term in 2013.

Preceded by Bob Corker	Mayor of Chattanooga; 2005 — 2013	Succeeded by Andy Berke
