= Trapper Keeper =

Brand of loose-leaf binder

Trapper Keeper is a brand of loose-leaf binder created by Mead. Popular with students in the United States and parts of Latin America from the 1970s to the 1990s, it featured sliding plastic rings (instead of standard snap-closed metal binder rings), folders, and pockets to keep schoolwork and papers, and a wrap-around flap with a Velcro closure (originally a metal snap closure).

Trapper Keepers usually had a theme, such as a cartoon, television show, or video game. Between 1988 and 1995, "Designer Series" Trapper Keepers featured abstract designs and, later, computer-generated images.

== Design history ==
The Trapper Keeper was invented in the late 1970s by Jon Wyant, Director of New Product Development at Mead, acting upon a request by E. Bryant Crutchfield, a marketing executive at Mead for a "locker item" that would allow folders to be easily removed, for their use in a class, yet protected from falling out accidentally.

No patent was filed by Mead, but the Trapper Keeper relied on earlier 1975 and 1976 patents by Wyant and fellow Mead employee Paul Seaborn. Wyant was also responsible for naming and creating the graphic design of the product. In 2013 Crutchfield had given interviews in which he claimed sole inventorship of the product, and these were erroneously cited in his 2022 New York Times obituary.

The binder got its name because it was sold in combination with pocket folders designed by Mead called "Trappers", which differed from other pocket folders in those the pockets' three sides connected with the bottom, outside edge, and top (as opposed to the bottom, outside edge, and spine) of the folders. This design prevented papers from falling out of the Trapper's pockets when it was closed. Trappers were three-hole punched so that they could be put in any three-ring binder, including a Trapper Keeper.

In preparation for test-marketing, Crutchfield wrote a commercial and flew from Dayton, Ohio (the headquarters of Mead) to New York City. With a total budget of $5000, he hired three actors and filmed his commercial in just three hours.

Wichita, Kansas was chosen as the initial market for August 1978. Trapper folders came in three colors (red, blue, and green), with a suggested retail price of 29 cents each, while the Trapper Keepers had a suggested retail price of $4.85 but came with a few Trapper folders.

In the test market, each Trapper Keeper also included a feedback card, which promised a free notebook from Mead if the card was returned. To everyone's surprise, the product inventory sold out, and the 1500 feedback cards returned revealed that adults as well as teens were buying Trapper Keepers, for non-school uses.

Three years after the Trapper Keeper was released, the design was tweaked to include a Velcro strap instead of the initial metal snap. This design change allowed for greater ease of use and more efficient manufacturing.

The Designer Series ran from 1988 to 1995, and introduced "fashionable, funky and sometimes psychedelic designs... The company also made a deal with Lisa Frank... and licensed cartoon characters like Garfield and Sonic the Hedgehog."

From 1996 to 1999, Mead released a collection of notebooks and folders known as "FuturoCity", featuring futuristic city and landscape designs.

In 2007, a new version of Trapper Keeper featured a magnetic closure in place of the Velcro closure, a customizable front cover, and binder dividers instead of Trapper folders.

In 2014, another new version of the Trapper Keeper was released, featuring a metal button closure, as well as a new feature called "Snapper Trappers", which are plastic strips that act as dividers and can have regular notebooks attached to them in addition to folders and dividers; the Snapper Trappers can be placed or removed without having to open the rings of the binder.

For the 2015 school year, Trapper Keeper introduced Star Wars Trapper Keeper supplies, and Hello Kitty Trapper Keeper supplies, and a new patterned line called Fun in the Sun.

Mead brought back the original design for the Trapper Keeper with most of its original features in 2021.

== See also ==
- Pee-Chee folder
