= William Crutchfield =

American politician

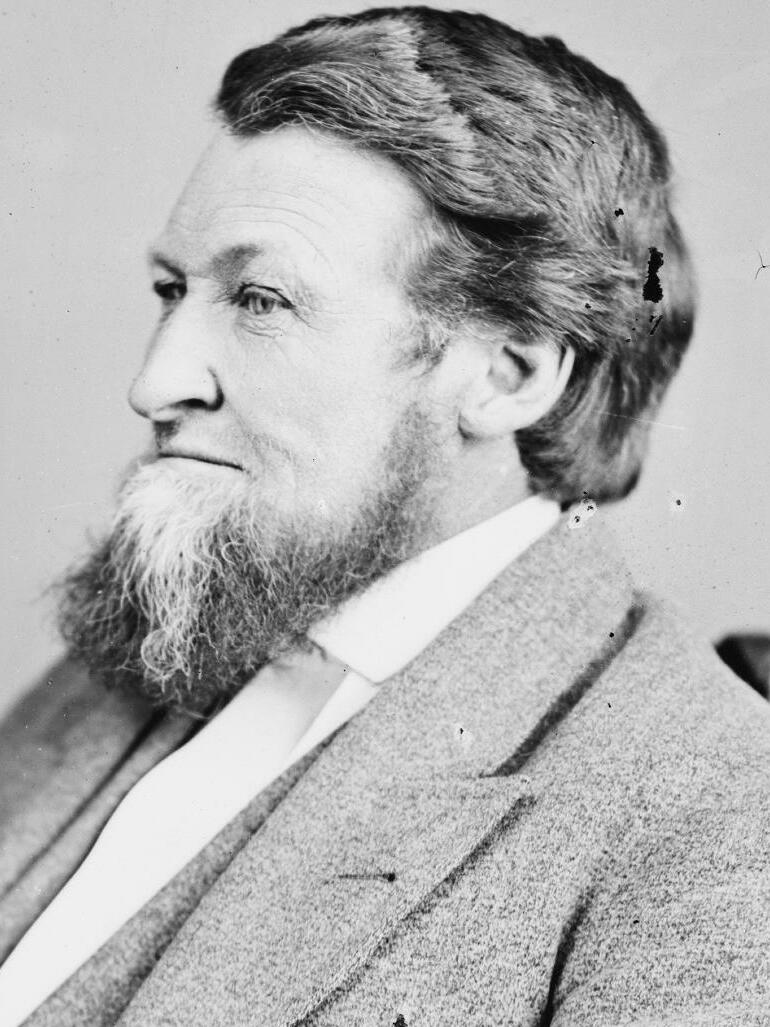

Member of the U.S. House of Representatives from Tennessee's 3rd district
- In office March 4, 1873 – March 3, 1875
- Preceded by: Abraham E. Garrett
- Succeeded by: George G. Dibrell

Personal details
- Born: November 16, 1824 Greeneville, Tennessee, U.S.
- Died: January 24, 1890 (aged 65) Chattanooga, Tennessee, U.S.
- Party: Whig; Republican
- Spouse: Nancy Jane Williams (m. 1859)
- Children: 8
- Profession: Merchant, farmer

William Crutchfield (November 16, 1824 – January 24, 1890) was an American politician who represented the 3rd congressional district of Tennessee in the United States House of Representatives for one term (1873–1875). He also served several terms as an alderman in his adopted hometown of Chattanooga, where he was a prominent figure and businessman. A Southern Unionist, he garnered regional fame and notoriety in January 1861 when he engaged in a heated debate with future Confederate States president Jefferson Davis at his family's Chattanooga hotel.

== Early life and career ==
Crutchfield was born in Greeneville, Tennessee, the son of Thomas Crutchfield Sr., a brick contractor, and Sarah (Cleage) Crutchfield. He attended common schools. He moved to McMinn County, Tennessee, in 1840, and remained there for four years before settling in Jacksonville, Alabama, in 1844. He established a large farm at Jacksonville that specialized in grain production and utilized innovative farming techniques. He was also elected a captain in the local militia. Inspired by Kentucky politician Henry Clay, he supported local Whig Party candidates.

In 1850, Crutchfield moved to Chattanooga, Tennessee, where his father had acquired a considerable amount of land, and had established a successful hotel, the Crutchfield House. After the elder Crutchfield died in 1850, William's brother, Thomas, took over the hotel's management. William was elected alderman in Chattanooga in December 1851, and reelected in 1854. In the late 1850s, he helped establish the city's fire and police departments.

== Civil War ==
During the secession crisis that followed the election of Abraham Lincoln in late 1860, Crutchfield remained committed to the Union. On January 22, 1861, Jefferson Davis, the future president of the Confederacy who had just resigned his seat in the United States Senate, stayed at the Crutchfield House while en route to his home in Mississippi. In the hotel's dining room that night, Davis delivered a short speech praising secession and encouraging Tennessee to join the rest of the South. After Davis had finished, Crutchfield, who had been listening, leaped upon a counter and delivered a scathing retort. He described Davis as a "renegade and a traitor," and stated that Tennessee would not be "hood winked, bamboozled and dragged into your Southern, codfish, aristocratic, tory blooded, South Carolina mobocracy." Davis refuted Crutchfield's charges in a brief response. One report of the incident stated that Davis's supporters had "pistols drawn and cocked for immediate use," while others suggested that Davis considered challenging Crutchfield to a duel. In any event, Crutchfield's brother, Thomas, led Davis from the room, and further incident was avoided.

Crutchfield attended the first session of the pro-Union East Tennessee Convention in Knoxville in late May 1861, and campaigned against secession in the Chattanooga area. He remained in Chattanooga for most of the Civil War. Amid the crackdown during the aftermath of the East Tennessee bridge burnings in November 1861, Crutchfield was arrested by Confederate authorities, but managed to escape. During the war, his family sold the Crutchfield House for $65,000 in Confederate money, and used the proceeds to purchase land and tobacco. Crutchfield would later sell the tobacco at a profit to Union soldiers.

While Crutchfield never enlisted, he frequently provided information on Confederate troop movements to Union forces operating in Chattanooga and the vicinity. During the Union bombardment of Chattanooga in August 1863, he was again pursued by Confederate authorities, but eluded them by swimming across the Tennessee River and reaching Union lines. He provided the leaders of the Army of the Cumberland with invaluable information regarding Confederate troop positions, and would subsequently serve as an honorary captain and local guide to Union generals throughout the Chickamauga Campaign. He assisted William B. Hazen and John B. Turchin at the Battle of Brown's Ferry in October 1863, and Ulysses S. Grant and George H. Thomas at the Battle of Missionary Ridge in November 1863. After the Union Army solidified its control of Chattanooga, Crutchfield provided assistance to General James B. Steedman and other post commanders until the close of the war. In his memoirs, General Philip H. Sheridan wrote that Crutchfield's "devotion to the Union cause knew no bounds," and described the information he provided as critical to the Union Army's success in the Chickamauga Campaign.

In April 1864, Crutchfield joined fellow Chattanooga-area Unionists Alfred Cate and Daniel C. Trewhitt as part of the Hamilton County delegation at the revived East Tennessee Convention in Knoxville. This meeting was bitterly divided over the issue of emancipation, however, and accomplished very little. In October 1865, Crutchfield was elected alderman in Chattanooga's provisional civil government, which was tasked with restoring order to the city. In December 1865, he was reelected to the same position for a full term.

== Postwar and Congress ==
In 1872, Crutchfield announced his candidacy for the 3rd district seat in the U.S. House of Representatives. At the local Republican Party convention in September, he was easily nominated over two other candidates on the first ballot. His Democratic opponent, David M. Key, was an old acquaintance and former Confederate who had witnessed Crutchfield's encounter with Jefferson Davis at the Crutchfield House in 1861. At the end of the war in 1865, Key had written to Crutchfield to ask if it was safe for former Confederates to return to the city. Though Democrats were generally the more successful party in the 3rd district during this period, Republicans experienced a statewide wave in 1872, and Crutchfield edged Key, 10,041 votes to 8,960, in the general election.

Crutchfield's eccentric personality and unsophisticated manner of dress garnered frequent media attention during his lone term in Congress. In 1873, a correspondent for the Washington Star noted that since the tenure of Davy Crockett in the 1830s, each of Tennessee's congressional delegations had included at least one "mountaineer character," and that Crutchfield filled this role in the Forty-third Congress. The correspondent described Crutchfield as "a sunburnt, wiry little man, with foxy hair and whiskers, and though, by report, of considerable means, wears the cheapest of homespun suits, a good deal frayed at the edges, and with a pair of heavy, well-greased cowhide brogans that were the perpetual despair of the Pullman boot-blacks." In reporting on one of Crutchfield's speeches, the correspondent used eye dialect to depict to Crutchfield's thick Southern accent.

Crutchfield's biggest accomplishment during his term in Congress was to obtain $600,000 (~$14.7 million in 2025) in appropriations for improvements to the Tennessee River, and smaller appropriations for improvements to the Little Tennessee and Hiwassee rivers. During heated civil rights debates in the House in early 1873, Crutchfield introduced a bizarre amendment to a civil rights bill that would have made it a crime for a white woman to refuse a proposal of marriage from a black man on the basis of "race, color, and previous condition of servitude." Though he intended this as a joke, it caused considerable irritation for his fellow Republican congressmen who had been fighting for the bill, and generated outrage among white and black residents alike in the 3rd district. Crutchfield did not seek reelection in 1874.

After his term in Congress, Crutchfield spent much of his time on his 500-acre (200 ha) orchard south of Chattanooga, where he produced fruit and engaged in other agricultural pursuits. He died in Chattanooga on January 24, 1890 (age 65 years, 69 days), and was interred at the family lot in Chattanooga's Citizens Cemetery.

Crutchfield was a friend of noted author George Washington Harris, and helped Harris become president of the Wills Valley Railroad after the Civil War. In a fictional discussion with the title character in the "Dedicatory" of his 1867 book, Sut Lovingood: Yarns Spun by a Nat'ral Born Durn'd Fool, Harris proposes they dedicate the book to Crutchfield, though Sut disagrees. The dedication to Crutchfield read: "My friend in storm and sunshine, brave enough to be true, and true enough to be singular; one who says what he thinks, and very often thinks what he says."

== See also ==
- Richard M. Edwards

U.S. House of Representatives
Preceded by Abraham E. Garrett	Member of the U.S. House of Representatives from Tennessee's 3rd congressional district 1873–1875	Succeeded by George G. Dibrell
