= Tim Kelly (Tennessee politician) =

American politician and businessman

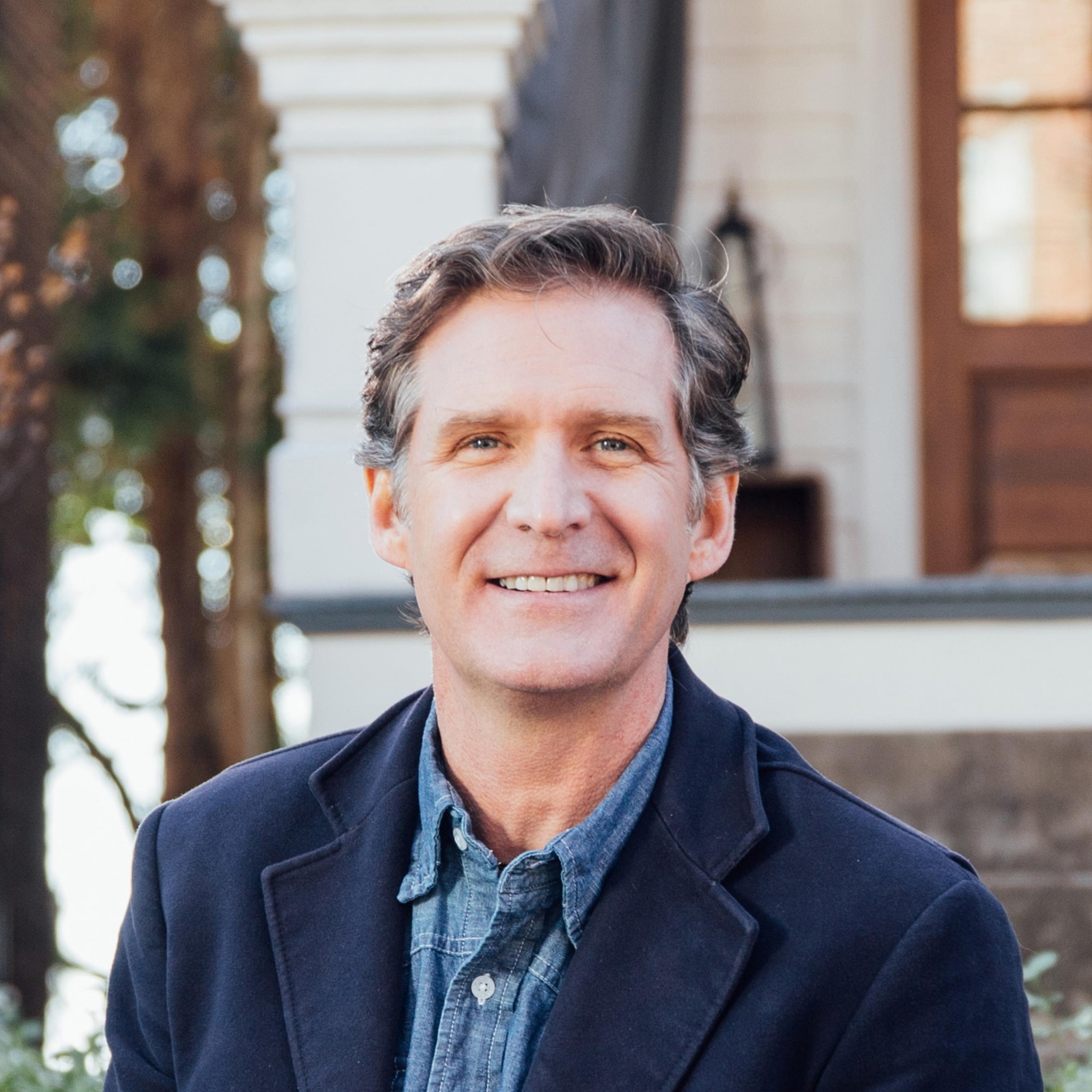

66th Mayor of Chattanooga
- Incumbent
- Assumed office April 19, 2021
- Preceded by: Andy Berke

Personal details
- Born: April 3, 1967 (age 59) Chattanooga, Tennessee
- Party: Independent
- Education: Columbia University (BA); Emory University (MBA)
- Website: Government website

Tim Kelly (born April 3, 1967) is an American politician and businessman who is serving as the 66th mayor of Chattanooga, Tennessee. He won re-election on March 5, 2025, against challenger Chris Long, by a margin of 17,356 (85.44%) to 2,750 (13.54%).

== Early life and education ==
Tim Kelly was born on April 3, 1967, in Chattanooga, Tennessee, to Betty Sue and Patrick Kelly. Kelly is a 1985 graduate of Baylor School in Chattanooga. He was a John Jay Scholar, and majored in German Comparative Literature at Columbia University, graduating in 1989. At Columbia, he was a roommate of Brent Forrester, who went on to become a writer of The Simpsons and showrunner of popular shows such as The Office. After graduating, he returned to Chattanooga, where he began working and eventually took over the family's auto dealerships. Kelly returned to school in 2012, earning his M.B.A at Emory University in Atlanta.

== Business career ==
After graduating from college, Tim Kelly took over his family's car business in Chattanooga, which consisted of a Cadillac and SAAB dealership. He added a Subaru dealership during his first year in business and later began selling GMC Trucks, Hummers, Mitsubishis, and Infinitis. In 2001, he founded Polaris of Chattanooga, and in 2003, he started Southern Honda Powersports. He later created the Zipflip and SocialBot apps. Kelly had taken on several roles in Chattanooga community organizations, including sitting on the boards of the Chattanooga Chamber of Commerce, the Community Foundation, Benwood, and the River City Company. Kelly is also a trustee of the Baylor School.

== Chattanooga FC ==
In 2009, Kelly co-founded the Chattanooga FC along with Krue Brock, Marshall Brock, Paul Rustand, Sean McDaniel, Daryl Heald, Hamilton Brock, Thomas Clark, and Sheldon Grizzle The team was founded to play in the National Premier Soccer League (NPSL), the fourth tier of the American soccer pyramid, and considered roughly equal to the USL Premier Development League.

Kelly was integral in organizing the first public stock offering of any American soccer team using the securities reform laws passed in late 2016 that allowed such investments. Under Kelly's direction, Chattanooga Football Club is the only major team other than the Green Bay Packers to offer common stock to the public. Chattanooga FC exceeded the $500,000 mark in public funding in February 2019. 44% of people with stock are from outside the Chattanooga metro area and come from 44 states and ten different countries.

== Mayor of Chattanooga ==
=== 2021 election ===
Kelly announced his intention to run for mayor on May 21, 2020, to succeed then-incumbent Andy Berke, who was term-limited. On March 2, 2021, Kelly received 30% of the votes cast in the general election, the highest number of votes of the 15 candidates in the race. Kelly won the mayoral runoff election against Kim White on April 13, 2021, with 59.9% of the votes. He was inaugurated on April 19, 2021. Kelly has stated that he does not identify with any political party.

Kelly endorsed the Democratic candidate, Kamala Harris, for President in the 2024 Presidential election while he spoke at the Hamilton County Democratic Party's annual Kefauver Dinner in 2024.

=== 2025 election ===
Tim Kelly won re-election to a second term in office, beating challenger Chris Long by a wide margin.

== Mayor tenure ==
=== Goals and Accomplishments ===
2021

At the beginning of Kelly’s term, the Administration addressed the Covid-19 pandemic by encouraging mask usage and vaccination, while reopening city facilities as cases subsided. During the process of reopening the city, Kelly allowed constituents to address the administration in-person through open office hours. He continued to promote the Covid-19 vaccination to Chattanoogans through the Vax 4 Cash Sweepstakes, a weekly drawing from a pool of residents who submitted proof of vaccination with an award of $1,000 and a city parking pass. To combat pandemic-era economic challenges, the City of Chattanooga began its partnership with United Way to implement a tax-relief program for seniors and disabled veterans.

The city also launched the EMPACT program with Google and ChattState, allowing Chattanoogans to earn Google IT Certifications and qualify for higher wage jobs.

2022

In 2022, the Kelly Administration published its One Chattanooga plan, the mayor’s strategic priorities for the city. The plan includes seven key goals:

• Build a universal path to early learning

• Catalyze economic vitality in the Black community

• Ensure affordable housing choices for all Chattanoogans

• Improve local infrastructure & public transit

• Build a competitive regional economy

• Close the gaps in public health

• Provide responsive and effective local government

That same year, Kelly also introduced the One Chattanooga Relief and Recovery Program, a $30 million investment in 36 community initiatives to increase economic vitality through housing and resource opportunities. The plan allocated $5.3 million to initiatives aimed at resolving homelessness, $1.56 million to initiatives increasing homeownership, and $5.8 million to create affordable housing. The remainder funded initiatives for workforce development, entrepreneurship, public safety, mental healthcare access, and early learning.

During the second year of his mayoral tenure, the Kelly administration implemented several initiatives focused on expanding affordable housing and redeveloping Chattanooga's public housing communities. The Kelly Administration launched the largest affordable housing initiative in Chattanooga history by contributing $100 million to create and preserve affordable housing. In addition, the adoption of the Westside Evolves Plan aimed to regenerate Chattanooga’s oldest public housing community. The ten-year plan was co-developed with public housing residents and envisions renovated units with a community hub and early learning center. Kelly led efforts to legalize accessory dwelling units in the city, expanding housing access by allowing for multiple structures on a single-family lot.

Improvements to local infrastructure were a major talking point of Kelly’s campaign, which featured a video of the mayor filling potholes. By the conclusion of his first full year in office, the Department of Public Works inspected 95% of Chattanooga’s roadways and filled 90% of reported potholes. The city also commissioned a 30 million gallon wastewater equalization station to prevent sanitary overflow into the Tennessee river.

Kelly introduced ‘Bridging Communities,’ a coalition of community partners serving immigrant and refugee communities. This strategic partnership brought together advocacy groups to engage in community outreach and economic support for immigrant families.

Kelly also led efforts to augment city culture, specifically through the Chattamatters civic education project.

2023

Among the most high profile economic development projects in 2023 was the South Broad revitalization project, estimated at more than $1 billion in future development, which is anchored by a new baseball complex jointly owned by Chattanooga and Hamilton County. In 2023, the city and county also jointly launched the One Westside project, which sets up future funding for new mixed-income units in one of the city’s oldest public housing projects paid for by private development in the adjacent area known as The Bend.

In 2023, the Kelly administration expanded municipal housing assistance and introduced new policy frameworks to address rising housing costs. The First-Time Home Buyer Grant and Loan Program, launched at the Affordable Housing Resource Fair in June in partnership with Chattanooga Neighborhood Enterprise (CNE), offered 0% interest loans and small grants to residents earning at or below the area median income. In the effort to combat rising housing costs, Chattanooga launched its first comprehensive policy toolkit to address housing, the Housing Action Plan. The city also introduced advancements to the Payment in Lieu of Taxes (PILOT) program to incentivize lower rent.

The city introduced a number of initiatives to address homelessness, expand localized healthcare access, and support workforce development. The city began a small-scale collaboration with Branch Technologies to develop 3-D printed temporary shelters for unhoused individuals, resulting in two initial shelter units. CARTA sold the Greyhound Bus Stop building to the city for future use as a homeless shelter with a capacity of 160 beds. And 1,000 previously unsheltered individuals were housed through city programs.

In addition to addressing housing instability, the administration directed funding toward the day-to-day needs of constituents. Community centers received an increase in healthcare resources and personnel, specifically for women, children, and infants. The mayor also launched a Mentor Hub to connect youth with local organizations offering mentor programs, motivating youth to invest in their futures.

The Kelly Administration opened the One Chattanooga Institute for Early Care and Learning at Tyner Academy, which gave high school students interested in early childhood education the opportunity to learn experientially. Chattanooga joined the Pathways for Early Childhood Leadership initiative, a peer-learning cohort led by the National League of Cities.

The city’s 2023 infrastructure push addressed both transit and utility systems. The Department of Public Works repaved 70 lane miles and filled 18,000 potholes, cracks, and divots. Kelly’s appointments to the airport board improved transportation and economic development, as his board promoted a new CEO who led dynamic reforms. That year, the Moccasin Bend Wastewater Treatment Plant treated 22 billion gallons of wastewater and cleaned 1.5 million feet of sewer lines. The Moccasin Bend Environmental Campus unveiled their project to convert Chattanooga wastewater to biogas, allowing the city to benefit and profit from waste. The city also received a $6 million urban forestry grant under Kelly’s leadership to improve Chattanooga’s urban tree cover.

The city received a $500k federal grant from the U.S. Department of Transportation for the initiative to return passenger rail travel to Chattanooga. Tim Kelly is an active board member of the Sunbelt Atlantic Railroad Coalition and leads an ongoing campaign for passenger rail access.

Kelly moved to decrease the impact of tourism in neighborhoods by passing legislation limiting short term vacation rentals in residential areas.

2024

By 2024, 30,000 new jobs in the Chattanooga area had been created since the beginning of Kelly’s mayoral term. In addition to job creation, the administration directed public and federal resources toward neighborhood redevelopment and modernization. The revitalization project for the Westside neighborhood received $50 million through a HUD Choice Neighborhoods Grant. Development plans for the revitalization of the South Chattanooga and East Lake neighborhoods secured a $500,000 grant. Chattanooga zoning laws were modernized under the Kelly Administration for the first time since the 1960s.

Bloomberg American Sustainable Cities selected Chattanooga to participate in its three-year advising program aimed at helping cities overcome historic inequalities for marginalized communities.

The administration's 2024 infrastructure initiatives focused on expanding transit safety and performing street repairs. The U.S. Department of Transportation awarded Chattanooga $4 million for pedestrian safety initiatives through the Reconnecting Communities & Neighborhoods and Strengthening Mobility and Revolutionizing Transportation (SMART) programs. Among ongoing efforts to ease traffic, fewer commuters faced delays due to the implementation of train warning systems along Hamill and Hickory Valley Roads. The Department of Public Works resurfaced 42 lane miles, filled 12,385 potholes, cracks, and divots, and recycled 40 tons of hard-to-recycle plastics in the pilot year of the Hefty ReNew™ recycling program.

In 2024, the Kelly administration reported several key municipal milestones, highlighting expansions in housing assistance alongside measurable reductions in crime. The administration housed 1,434 unsheltered individuals and moved to expand the local affordable housing supply. Individual affordable housing units within new developments were incentivized in updates to the Affordable Housing PILOT Program. The city saw a reduction of 15% in overall crime, 32% in overdoses, and 24% in traffic crashes. 0.15% of police officer interactions with community members required force.

The Kelly administration in 2024 updated the city’s public image, unveiling a new brand to promote the city, and a new website at Chattanooga.gov, which was redesigned to make information more accessible. Conde’ Nast Traveler recognized Chattanooga as the ‘Friendliest City in the U.S.’, and Kelly led the effort for Chattanooga to be selected as a Team Base Camp Candidate for the 2026 FIFA World Cup.

In continuation of Chattanooga’s focus on its outdoor resources, Kelly established the Shallowford Urban Ecological Preserve, which preserved 27 acres of intact forest and streams.

2025

In 2025, the Kelly Administration implemented the new zoning rules, unveiled voluntary initiative for developers who build affordable housing, updated sign ordinances, and reformed the city’s PILOT tax incentive for affordable housing. The groundbreaking of the Chattanooga Land Bank Authority’s first affordable home marked a milestone for expanding housing on land that was previously trapped in legal limbo.

The 2025 infrastructure agenda addressed a range of public works. The administration began renovations of the historic Walnut Street Bridge in order to save the bridge, which had been suffering from structural issues for decades. The city obtained a Strengthening Mobility and Revolutionizing Transportation (SMART) federal grant to implement walkway and roadway changes. The Kelly Administration announced downtown parking reforms to remedy traffic congestion and an enhanced CARTA plan, including a park-and-ride shuttle to access the Northshore from downtown. Alongside these public transit reforms, the city also undertook major updates to its municipal utility networks. The e2i2 Wastewater Project added two 15-million-gallon wastewater tanks to prevent sewer overflows during heavy rainfall.

The Kelly administration addressed the city’s sports and tourism sectors as construction began in 2025 on Erlanger Park, the new home of the Chattanooga Lookouts in the South Broad neighborhood, on land that was formerly a vacant brownfield. The stadium is designed to attract new businesses and housing developments to the historically neglected area. Kelly also worked to attract Auckland City FC to Chattanooga, as the football club chose Chattanooga as their home base during the 2025 FIFA Club World Cup. For outdoor tourism, the city launched a revitalization initiative for Chattanooga's riverfront parks, backed by $15 million in state funding, $10 million in local funds, and a private fundraising campaign to enhance public spaces around the Tennessee River.

Chattanooga became the first city in North America to achieve National Park City status. The city featured in “The South’s Best Cities” by Southern Living, “20 Best Places to Visit in Tennessee” by Travel + Leisure, “Best Underrated Travel Destinations in the US” by US News, and “9 Beautiful Mountain Towns in the Southeast” by Outside magazine.

On the economic side, 2025 estimates projected the city to generate $1.1 billion in economic growth by 2035 as a result of an ongoing $22 million project to establish a quantum computing network; Chattanooga was the first city in the United States to establish a commercially available quantum network. EPB and Vanderbilt University launched The Institute for Quantum Innovation based in Chattanooga as a quantum research and educational center.

In 2025 the Chattanooga Police Department reported a 48% decrease in homicides, 26% decrease in non-fatal shooting victims, 9% decrease in crimes against persons, and 16% decrease in crimes against property in 2025. The department achieved a 93% homicide clearance rate, almost double the national average.

The administration implemented several operational updates to better address constituent concerns. The Kelly Administration launched a streamlined 311 mobile app and online portal, allowing residents to report local maintenance and infrastructure issues directly to city departments. Kelly’s 2025 budget reorganized and added 25 jobs to the Department of Technology Services. The city also delivered pay raises to first responders. In the Public Works Department, the administration advanced its green initiatives through the addition of compressed natural gas vehicles to the city’s fleet.

2026

The Kelly administration grew community-level social services to expand the city footprint into neighborhoods. The Kelly Administration opened the East Lake Community Center Resource Hub to provide access to health resources, workforce development, and community services. The Small Business Resource Center was launched to give local entrepreneurs access to tools and mentorship to grow their business in Chattanooga. Additionally, the Kelly Administration secured the establishment of a new shelter and resource center for families experiencing homelessness by donating the former Airport Inn to the Grateful Gobbler for renovation.

The city introduced several new affordable housing initiatives in 2026, securing national recognition for its municipal policies and expanding resources for first-time homebuyers. The city broke ground on new affordable housing units in the Northshore neighborhood utilizing its Payment in Lieu of Taxes (PILOT) program, an initiative that earned the 2026 Ivory Prize for Housing Affordability. Chattanooga began transforming underutilized land into livable units by launching a collaboration with faith-based organizations. The city obtained additional funding for mixed-income housing with permanent, built-in affordability through a collaboration with Invest Chattanooga and American South Capital Partners. The opportunity allowed first-time homebuyers to seek up to $21,000 through the Down Payment Assistance Program in partnership with the Tennessee Housing Development Agency.

The city's infrastructure push focused on legislative efforts alongside localized public works and transit safety projects. Kelly contained costs of large infrastructural projects through a state law passed with the help of State Sen. Todd Gardenhire. Chattanooga received a AAA bond rating, and taxpayers saved $400,000 on 16 capital projects due to the low bond rate. In addition to these statewide regulatory changes, the city continued to carry out local municipal maintenance. The Department of Public Works under Kelly’s leadership continued to fix roadways, filling 26,866 potholes. The Department of Public Works’ Fleet Division ranked as one of North America’s 100 Best. As an effort to improve the first impressions of Chattanooga’s downtown, the Fourth Street exit of Highway 27 was revamped. Furthermore, the administration addressed localized transit delays and pedestrian safety through targeted capital projects and new federal funding. The administration moved to resolve transit delays for Hixson commuters and ensure emergency vehicle access to the adjacent hospital after the Chattanooga City Council approved Kelly's plan to build a rail overpass on Hamill Road. Advancements to roadway safety initiatives were boosted after securing a $1.06 million grant from the Department of Transportation.

The grand opening of Erlanger Park baseball stadium, the new home of the Chattanooga Lookouts, brought thousands back to the city’s baseball sphere. Leveraging his background as the Chattanooga FC chairman, Kelly worked with the Spain National Football Team and successfully lobbied them to choose Chattanooga as their FIFA World Cup Base Camp. The elite team trained at Kelly’s high school alma mater, Baylor School, before going on to win the championship.

The city catalyzed more affordable housing, and helped fund its quantum institute through the allocation of millions of dollars in federal grants. Kelly also introduced a new downtown recreational park in partnership with BlueCross BlueShield’s Pavilion Park plan. Such efforts have landed Chattanooga recognition, as Livability.com ranked Chattanooga No, 83 on their list of 100 US Cities with highest livability scores and No. 8 on Southern Living's “The South’s Best Cities."

To address staffing shortages, the city partnered with Work for America to launch the new city employment website. The Kelly Administration worked to prioritize the hiring of Chattanoogans in local positions with proper training and support through the One Chattanooga Works employment initiative. In 2026, Kelly also partnered with Jigsaw to distribute Civic Dialogue surveys to the public to understand their hopes for city parks and public transportation.
