= Andrew McLaren (actor) =

American film and television actor (born 1980)

- Born: July 24, 1980 (age 46); Staten Island, New York
- Height: 5 ft 11 in (1.80 m)
- Website: www.andrew-mclaren.com

Andrew McLaren (July 24, 1980) is a U.S Marine Corps veteran, turnedfilm and television actor. He appeared on the NBC television program Stars Earn Stripes and played Captain Sampson in the dramatic film Battle For Haditha.

== Military Career ==
As a U.S. Marine he attained the enlisted rank of sergeant. McLaren served in Iraq and Liberia and, at one point, was assigned to the Fleet Antiterrorism Security Team (FAST).

== Acting Career ==
McLaren's acting career began in the 2007 He appeared in the drama film, Battle for Haditha, which starred Marine veterans in leading roles. The film is based loosely on a real event, and reconstructs the fighting in Haditha, Iraq, during two days in November 2005. In 2009, he went on to co-host the Discovery Channel miniseries, Weaponizers and appeared in another series, "Chrome Underground." In August 2012, McLaren appeared on Stars Earn Stripes. The show consisted of celebrities paired with former and current military and law enforcement members to coach them through military-style exercises. The competitors play to win cash for a military-, veteran-, or service-related charity of their choice.

In 2013 Andrew co-produced a short film titled "The Price We Pay" starring A.L.M.A winner Jesse Garcia and golden globe winner Gina Rodriguez. The movie was about a soldier returning home from war with P.T.S.D and it screened in Los Angeles and Miami. In May 2014, he starred in the Discovery Channel's TV series, Chrome Underground, which was filmed in Brazil, Mexico and Argentina. Andrew is the Executive Producer for the film Sugarfields (2015). Filmed in Puerto Rico, it tells the story of Juan, an orphaned boy growing up and trying to escape from a life of crime.

== Filmography ==
Year	Film	Role
2007	Battle for Haditha	Capt. Sampson
2015	Sugarfields	

== Television ==
Year	Title	Role	Notes
2009	Weaponizers	Himself	3 Episodes
2012	Stars Earn Stripes	Himself	4 Episodes
2014	Chrome Underground	Himself	6 Episodes
