= Timeline of Clarksville, Tennessee =

The following is a timeline of the history of the city of Clarksville, Tennessee, United States.

== 18th-19th centuries ==
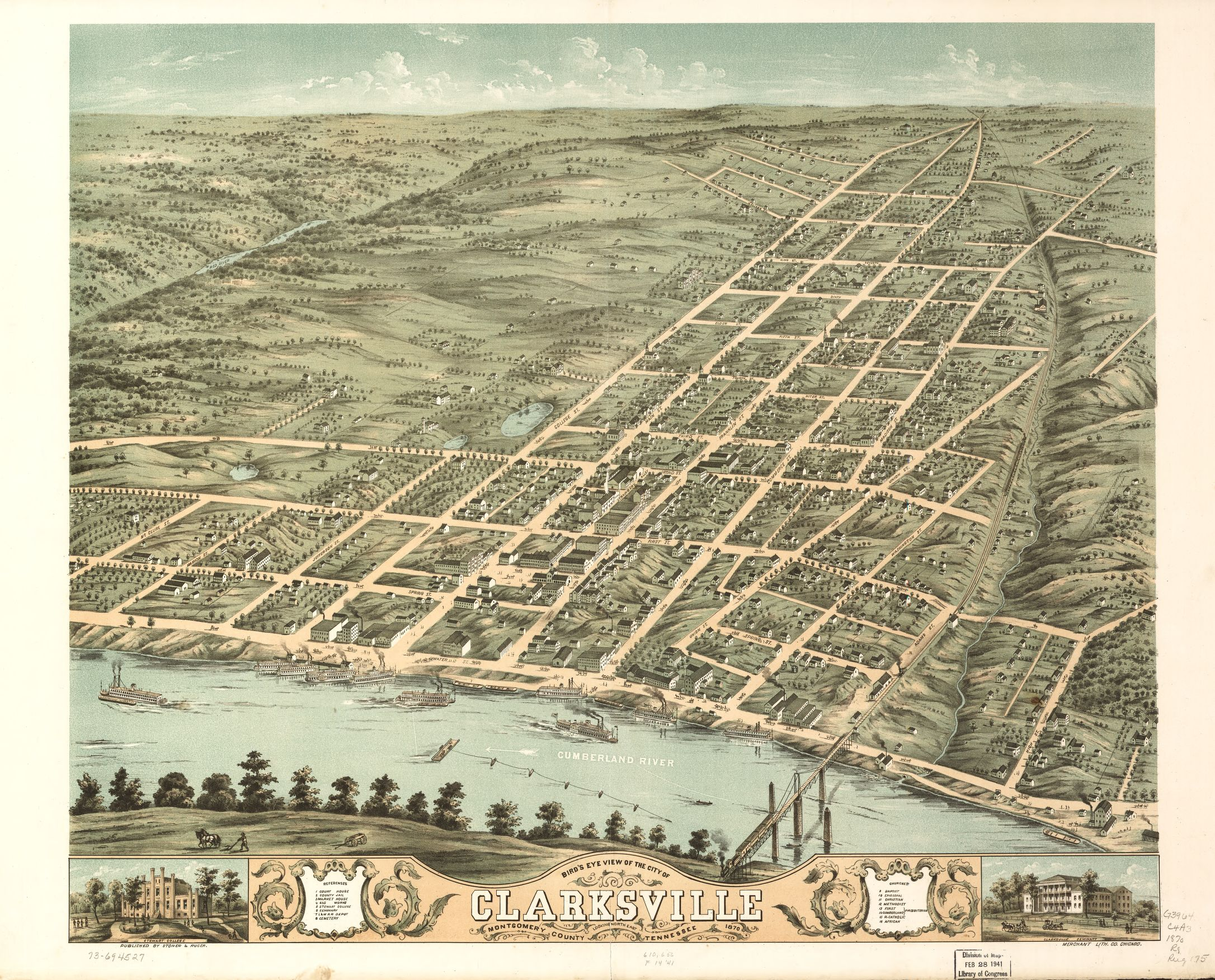
Overview of Clarksville, Tennessee, 1870

- 1784 - Town platted; named Clarksville after military leader George Rogers Clark.
- 1788 - Blockhouse (fort) built.
- 1794 - November 11: "Native American attack repulsed at blockhouse."
- 1796 - Town becomes seat of newly formed Montgomery County.
- 1800 - Religious "revival at Red River" held near Clarksville.
- 1815 - Clarksville Chronicle newspaper in publication.
- 1820 - James E. Elder becomes mayor.
- 1822 - First Presbyterian Church founded.
- 1830
  - Tobacco stemmery in business.
  - Post House built (approximate date).
- 1840 - Population: 1,754.
- 1846 - Clarksville Female Academy chartered.
- 1850
  - Stewart College active.
  - Population: 2,128.
- 1855 - City of Clarksville incorporated.
- 1860
  - Memphis, Clarksville and Louisville Railroad begins operating.
  - Population: 2,850.
- 1868 - Labor strike of the Memphis, Clarksville and Louisville Railroad.
- 1869 - Clarksville Tobacco Leaf newspaper begins publication.
- 1870 - Population: 3,200.
- 1875 - Southwestern Presbyterian University active.
- 1878
  - Fire.
  - County courthouse constructed.
- 1880 - Population: 3,880.
- 1882 - Madison Street Methodist Church built.
- 1888 - Star newspaper begins publication.
- 1889 - Times newspaper begins publication.
- 1890
  - Clarksville Evening Tobacco Leaf-Chronicle newspaper in publication.
  - Population: 7,924.
- 1900 - Population: 9,431.

== 20th century ==
- 1905 - Herald newspaper begins publication.
- 1910
  - January 6: Snowstorm.
  - Population: 8,548.
- 1919 - First Woman's Bank established.
- 1920 - Population: 8,110.
- 1922 - Confederate Monument installed in Greenwood Cemetery.
- 1923 - Public library established.
- 1925 - Southwestern Presbyterian University moves from Clarksville to Memphis.
- 1927 - Austin Peay Normal School founded.
- 1928 - Capitol Theatre in business.
- 1930 - Population: 9,242.
- 1937 - January: Flood.
- 1940 - Population: 11,831.
- 1941
  - WJZM radio begins broadcasting.
  - Roxy Theatre in business.
- 1942 - U.S. military Camp Campbell begins operating near Clarksville.
- 1950 - Population: 16,246.
- 1954 - WDXN radio begins broadcasting.
- 1955 - Sunset Drive-In cinema in business.
- 1959 - Clarksville-Montgomery County Public Library active.
- 1960
  - Clarksville–Montgomery County Regional Airport active.
  - Athlete Wilma Rudolph of Clarksville wins gold medal at 1960 Summer Olympics.
  - Population: 22,021.
- 1970 - Population: 31,719.
- 1980 - Population: 54,777.
- 1984 - Clarksville Montgomery County Museum established.
- 1990 - Population: 75,494.
- 1999 - January 22: Tornado.
- 2000 - Population: 103,455.

== 21st century ==
- 2003 - Marsha Blackburn becomes U.S. representative for Tennessee's 7th congressional district.
- 2010
  - Population: 132,929.
  - Cumberland River overflowed with nearly a foot of rainfall, covering Downtown Clarksville and causing hundreds of thousands of dollars in damage.
- 2011 - Kim McMillan becomes mayor.
- 2019
  - Mark Green becomes U.S. representative for Tennessee's 7th congressional district.
  - Joe Pitts becomes mayor.
- 2020 - Population: 166,772.
- 2023 - Intense EF3 tornado impacts the area, killing 3 and injuring 60+

== See also ==
- Clarksville history
- List of mayors of Clarksville, Tennessee
- National Register of Historic Places listings in Montgomery County, Tennessee
- Timelines of other cities in Tennessee: Chattanooga, Knoxville, Memphis, Murfreesboro, Nashville

== Bibliography ==
- Williams' Clarksville Directory, 1859
- "Clarksville". Tennessee State Gazetteer and Business Directory for 1860-61. Nashville: John L. Mitchell. 1860.
- Joseph Buckner Killebrew; Tennessee Bureau of Agriculture (1874), "Middle Tennessee: Montgomery County: Clarksville", Introduction to the Resources of Tennessee, vol. 2, Nashville: Tavel, Eastman & Howell
- "Clarksville". Tennessee State Gazetteer and Business Directory. Nashville: R.L. Polk & Co. 1876.
- History of Tennessee. Nashville: Goodspeed. 1886. "Sketch of Montgomery, Robertson, Humphreys, Stewart, Dickson, Cheatham and Houston Counties". (Includes information about Clarksville)
- Picturesque Clarksville. W.P. Titus. 1887.
- Clarksville Sesqui-Centennial Historical Book, 1784-1934. 1934. OCLC 10231246.
- Federal Writers' Project (1939), "Clarksville", Tennessee: a Guide to the State, American Guide Series, New York: Viking, hdl:2027/mdp.39015066068928 – via HathiTrust
- Stephen V. Ash (1977). "Community at War: Montgomery County, 1861-65". Tennessee Historical Quarterly. 36 (1): 30–43. JSTOR 42623768.
- Richard P. Gildrie (1983). "Lynch Law and the Great Clarksville Fire of 1878: Social Order in a New South Town". Tennessee Historical Quarterly. 42 (1): 58–75. JSTOR 42626339.
- Charles M. Waters (1983). Historic Clarksville: the Bicentennial Story, 1784-1984. OCLC 10204442.
- Ursula S. Beach (1988). Robert B. Jones (ed.). Montgomery County. Tennessee County History Series. Memphis State University Press. OCLC 6820526. (Includes information about Clarksville)
- Ursula S. Beach and Eleanor Williams (1989). Nineteenth Century Heritage, Clarksville, Tenn. Oxford, Mississippi: Guild Bindery Press. OCLC 21759714.
- Thomas H. Winn (1990). "Liquor, Race, and Politics: Clarksville During the Progressive Period". Tennessee Historical Quarterly. 49.
- Paul T. Hellmann (2006). "Tennessee: Clarksville". Historical Gazetteer of the United States. Taylor & Francis. ISBN 1-135-94859-3.
