= Timeline of Knoxville, Tennessee =

The following is a timeline of the history of the city of Knoxville, Knox County, Tennessee, USA.

== Prior to 19th century ==
- 1786 – White's Fort built.
- 1791
  - Knoxville founded as the capital of the Southwest Territory, named for Henry Knox
  - Knoxville Gazette newspaper begins publication.
- 1792 – Blount Mansion built.
- 1793 – First Presbyterian Church established.
- 1794 – Blount College (later the University of Tennessee) established.
- 1796 – Knoxville becomes capital of new U.S. state of Tennessee.
- 1800 – Population: 387.

== 19th century ==
- 1806 – Hampden and Sydney School incorporated.
- 1815 – City of Knoxville incorporated.
- 1816 – Thomas Emmerson becomes mayor.
- 1817 – Knoxville Hotel in business.
- 1818 – Craighead-Jackson House (residence) built.
- 1820 – Population: 1,115.
- 1827 – Knoxville Female Academy established.
- 1828 – The Atlas becomes the first steamboat to reach Knoxville, having successfully navigated the lower Tennessee River
- 1834 – East Tennessee Historical and Antiquarian Society founded.
- 1840 – Population: 1,830.
- 1844 – Tennessee Asylum for the Deaf and Dumb established.
- 1845 – Warner Tabernacle AME Zion Church congregation established.
- 1849 – Brownlow's Whig newspaper relocates to Knoxville.
- 1850
  - Old Gray Cemetery established.
  - Population: 2,076.
  - First Baptist Church built.
- 1854
  - James C. Luttrell becomes mayor.
  - Market Square established
- 1855
  - East Tennessee and Georgia Railroad begins operating.
  - William Graham Swan becomes mayor.
- 1860 – Population: 5,300.
- 1863
  - Siege of Knoxville.
  - Battle of Fort Sanders.
  - Knoxville National Cemetery established.
- 1864 – E.J. Sanford and Company in business.
- 1868 – City Hall built on Market Square.
- 1869 – Knoxville Industrial Association founded.
- 1870
  - Ebenezer Mill built (approximate date).
  - Population: 8,682.
- 1871 – Cowan, McClung and Co. building constructed.
- 1872 – Staub's Theatre opens.
- 1873 – William Rule becomes mayor.
- 1874
  - Customs House built.
  - Peter Staub becomes mayor.
- 1875 – Knoxville College founded.
- 1880 – Population: 9,693.
- 1885
  - Knoxville Fire Department and Lawson McGhee Library established.
  - Knox County Courthouse built.
- 1886 – Sentinel newspaper (later the Knoxville News Sentinel) begins publication.
- 1887
  - Knoxville Negro World newspaper begins publication.
  - Chamber of Commerce established.
- 1888
  - Sterchi Brothers Furniture Company in business.
  - Martin Condon becomes mayor.
- 1890
  - Peter Kern becomes mayor.
  - Population: 22,535.
  - Electric streetcar begins operating.
- 1891 – H. T. Hackney Company in business.
- 1892 – St. John's Cathedral rebuilt.
- 1896 - Flag of Knoxville, Tennessee is designed
- 1897
  - "Million Dollar Fire" destroys part of Gay Street.
  - Market House rebuilt on Market Square.
  - North Knoxville (modern Old North Knoxville) becomes part of city
- 1898
  - West Knoxville (modern Fort Sanders) becomes part of city.
  - Gay Street Bridge constructed.
- 1900 – Population: 32,637.

== 20th century ==
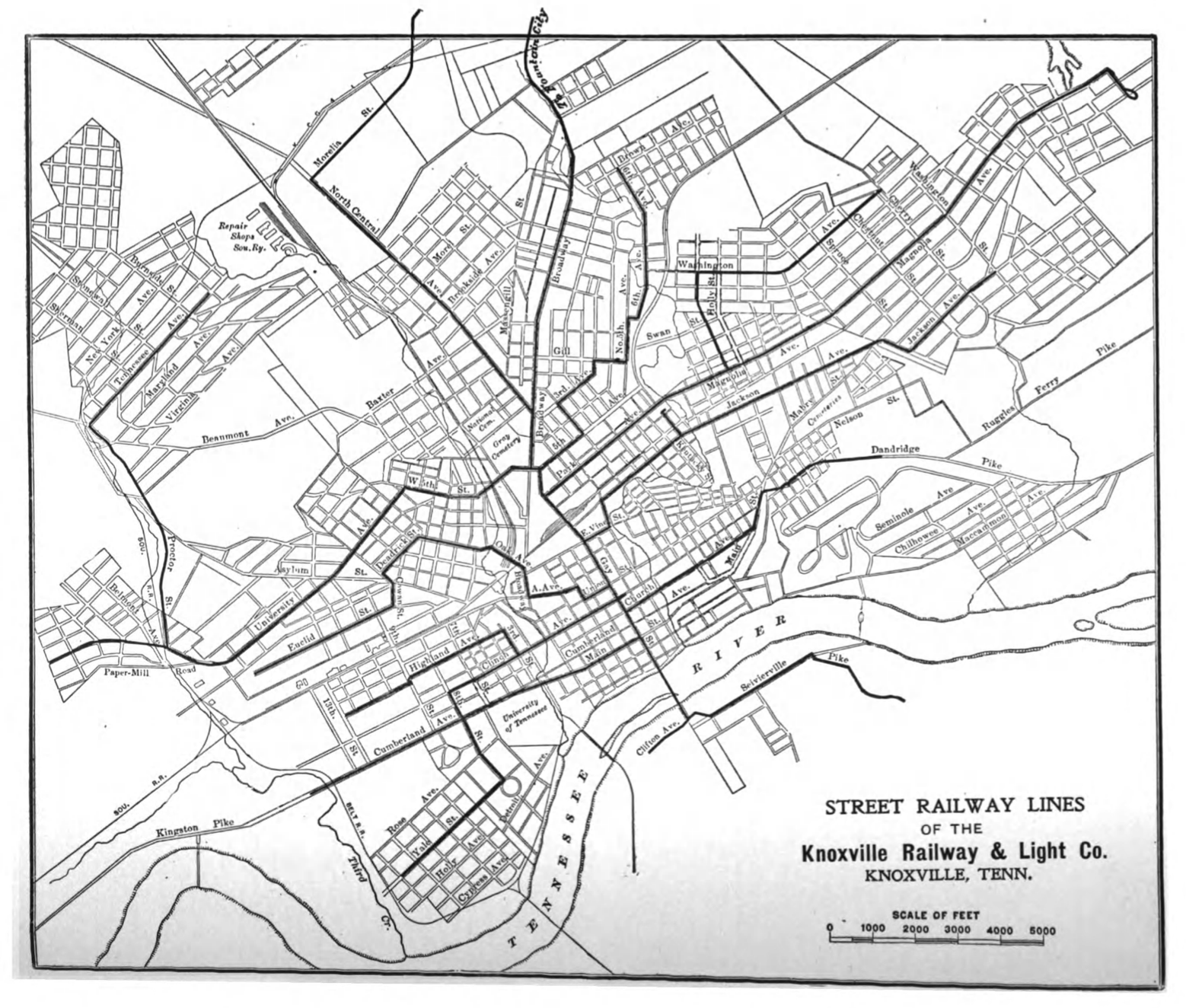
Map of Street Railway Lines of the Knoxville Railway and Light Company c 1912

- 1905
  - Knoxville Railway and Light Company established.
  - L&N Station (Knoxville) built.
- 1909 – Knoxville City Beautiful League organized.
- 1910
  - First Appalachian Exposition held.
  - Population: 36,346.
- 1911 – Second Appalachian Exposition held.
- 1912 – The city replaces its mayor-alderman form of government with a commission.
- 1913 – National Conservation Exposition held.
- 1914 – Candoro Marble Works in operation.
- 1917
  - Park City becomes part of the city.
  - South Knoxville becomes part of the city.
- 1919
  - Riot of 1919 takes place.
  - October: Streetcar strike.
- 1920 – Population: 77,818.
- 1921 – WNAV radio begins broadcasting.
- 1923 – The city replaces its commission with a city manager-council form of government; Louis Brownlow hired as first city manager
- 1925 – City government moves to City Hall on Summit Hill Drive.
- 1926
  - Knoxville News Sentinel in publication.
  - Lincoln Park United Methodist Church built.
- 1927
  - WROL radio begins broadcasting.
  - Daylight Building constructed.
- 1928
  - Tennessee Theatre opens.
  - James Alexander Fowler becomes mayor.
- 1930
  - Andrew Johnson Building constructed.
  - Population: 105,802.
- 1931 – Henley Street Bridge constructed.
- 1932 – Church Street Methodist Episcopal Church built.
- 1933 – Tennessee Valley Authority headquartered in Knoxville.
- 1934 – United States Post Office and Courthouse built.
- 1938 – Park Theatre opens.
- 1940 – Population: 111,580.
- 1942 – Town of Oak Ridge developed near Knoxville.
- 1943 – Oak Ridge National Laboratory established near Knoxville.
- 1946
  - Cas Walker becomes mayor.
  - Journalist John Gunther dubs Knoxville the "ugliest city" in America, sparking beautification efforts
- 1947 – Office of City Manager merged with Mayor's office
- 1950 – Population: 124,769.
- 1951 - Municipal Zoo established.
- 1952 – George Roby Dempster becomes mayor.
- 1953 - WATE-TV and WTVK (television) begin broadcasting.
- 1956 - WBIR-TV (television) begins broadcasting.
- 1959 – John Duncan, Sr. becomes mayor.
- 1960
  - Protest by African Americans during the Civil Rights Movement.
  - Population: 111,827.
- 1962
  - Fountain City and Bearden become part of the city.
  - Highlander Research and Education Center relocates to Knoxville from Monteagle.
- 1970 – Population: 174,587.
- 1972 – Kyle Testerman becomes mayor.
- 1974 – Streaking occurs.
- 1976 – Randy Tyree becomes mayor.
- 1980 – Population: 175,045.
- 1981 – Knoxville Community Food Cooperative organized.
- 1982 – 1982 World's Fair held; Sunsphere built.
- 1983
  - Knoxville Opera Company active.
  - Halls Cinema in business.
- 1984 – Doyle Park established.
- 1985 – Riverview Tower built.
- 1987 – Victor Ashe becomes mayor.
- 1988
  - WCKS radio begins broadcasting.
  - Jimmy Duncan Jr. becomes U.S. representative for Tennessee's 2nd congressional district.
- 1990 – Population: 165,121.
- 1991 – City bicentennial.
- 1992 – Petro's Chili & Chips franchise headquartered in Knoxville.
- 1994 – Home & Garden Television headquartered in Knoxville.
- 1995 - City website online.
- 1996
  - Knoxville-Oak Ridge Regional Network online.
  - Adair Park built.
- 1998 - Knoxville Area Chamber Partnership organized.
- 2000 – Population: 173,890.

== 21st century ==
- 2003 – Bill Haslam becomes mayor.
- 2005
  - Knoxville Marathon begins.
  - Tennessee Archive of Moving Image and Sound and Three Rivers Market food co-op established.
- 2010 – Population: 178,874.
- 2011 – Daniel Brown becomes mayor, succeeded by Madeline Rogero.
- 2019 - Indya Kincannon becomes mayor.
- 2020 Population 190,740.

== See also ==
- History of Knoxville, Tennessee
- List of mayors of Knoxville, Tennessee
- National Register of Historic Places listings in Knox County, Tennessee
- Timelines of other cities in Tennessee: Chattanooga, Clarksville, Memphis, Murfreesboro, Nashville

== Bibliography ==
=== Published in the 19th century ===
- R.H. Long (1863), "Knoxville", Hunt's Gazetteer of the Border and Southern States, Pittsburgh, Pa.: John P. Hunt
- Charles H. Jones (1873), "Knoxville", Appletons' Hand-book of American Travel: the Southern Tour, New York: D. Appleton & Co.
- Joseph Buckner Killebrew; Tennessee Bureau of Agriculture (1874), "East Tennessee: Knox County: Knoxville", Introduction to the Resources of Tennessee, vol. 1, Nashville: Tavel, Eastman & Howell
- "Knoxville". Tennessee State Gazetteer and Business Directory for 1876-7. Nashville: R.L. Polk & Co. 1876.
- Norwood's Knoxville Directory: 1884. Cotton Belt Pub. Co. 1883.
- J.W. Caldwell (1893). "History of Knoxville, Tennessee". East Tennessee: Historical and Biographical. Chattanooga, Tenn.: A.D. Smith & Co. hdl:2027/wu.89077948958. ISBN 9781403500816.
- "Knoxville", Rand, McNally & Co.'s Handy Guide to the Southeastern States, Chicago: Rand, McNally & Co., 1899

=== Published in the 20th century ===
- William Rule, ed. (1900), Standard History of Knoxville, Tennessee, Chicago: Lewis Publishing Company, OL 23369722M
- F.H. Richardson (1905). "Knoxville". Richardson's Southern Guide. Chicago: Monarch Book Company – via Internet Archive.
- City of Knoxville, Tennessee and Vicinity (Knoxville: Knoxville Board of Trade, 1906)
- "A New Knoxville", Art and Progress, 2, American Federation of Arts, 1910
- Knoxville, Tennessee Directory, 1915 (Knoxville: Knoxville Directory Company, 1915).
- Kate White (1924), "Knoxville's Old Educational Institutions", Tennessee Historical Magazine, 8 (1): 3–6, ISSN 2333-9012, JSTOR 42637473
- Federal Writers' Project (1939), "Knoxville", Tennessee: a Guide to the State, American Guide Series, New York: Viking, hdl:2027/mdp.39015066068928
- Tennessee Historical Records Survey (1941), "Hamilton County (Knoxville)", Directory of Churches, Missions, and Religious Institutions of Tennessee, no. 47, Nashville
- Knoxville City Directory, 1960 (Knoxville: City Directory Company, 1960)
- W. R. McNabb (1972), "History of the Knoxville City Hall", Tennessee Historical Quarterly, 31 (3): 256–260, ISSN 0040-3261, JSTOR 42623317
- East Tennessee Historical Society, Lucile Deaderick (ed.), Heart of the Valley: A History of Knoxville, Tennessee (Knoxville, Tenn.: East Tennessee Historical Society, 1976)
- James A. Burran (1979), "Labor Conflict in Urban Appalachia: The Knoxville Streetcar Strike of 1919", Tennessee Historical Quarterly, 38 (1): 62–78, JSTOR 42625936
- Charles S. Aiken (1983). "Transformation of James Agee's Knoxville". Geographical Review. 73 (2): 150–165. Bibcode:1983GeoRv..73..150A. doi:10.2307/214641. JSTOR 214641.
- George Thomas Kurian (1994), "Knoxville", World Encyclopedia of Cities, vol. 1: North America, Santa Barbara, Calif.: ABC-CLIO, OL 1431653M – via Internet Archive (fulltext)

=== Published in the 21st century ===
- Charles H. Faulkner (2000), "Knoxville and the Southern Appalachian Frontier: An Archaeological Perspective", Tennessee Historical Quarterly, 59 (3): 158–173, JSTOR 42627557
- Lisa L. Zagumny (2001). "Sit-Ins in Knoxville, Tennessee: A Case Study of Political Rhetoric". Journal of Negro History. 86 (1): 45–54. doi:10.2307/1350178. JSTOR 1350178. S2CID 141496195.
- William Bruce Wheeler (2005). Knoxville, Tennessee: A Mountain City in the New South. Univ. of Tennessee Press. ISBN 978-1-57233-336-9.
- Bradley Reeves; Louisa Trott (2010), "Itinerant Filmmaking in Knoxville in the 1920s: A Story Told through Unseen Movies", Moving Image: The Journal of the Association of Moving Image Archivists, 10 (1): 126–143, JSTOR 41167344
- "Timeline of events in Knoxville from 1900-1909", Knoxville News Sentinel, January 29, 2012
- "Timeline of news in Knoxville: 1920-1929", Knoxville News Sentinel, March 25, 2012
- "A timeline: Knoxville, 1950-1959", Knoxville News Sentinel, June 24, 2012
- "1970s timeline", Knoxville News Sentinel, August 26, 2012
