= Timeline of Murfreesboro, Tennessee =

The following is a timeline of the history of the city of Murfreesboro, Tennessee, United States.

== 19th century ==
- 1811
  - October 27: Cannonsburgh established by state legislature as seat of Rutherford County.
  - November 29: Cannonsburgh renamed "Murfreesborough" after military officer Hardy Murfree.
- 1817 - Murfreesboro incorporated.
- 1818
  - Murfreesboro designated Tennessee state capital.
  - Population: 950 (estimate).
- 1822 - County courthouse burns down.
- 1826 - Tennessee state capital moves from Murfreesboro to Nashville.
- 1827 - Temperance Society formed.
- 1828 - Andrew Jackson visits town.
- 1830 - Population: 786.
- 1832 - May 7: Tornado.
- 1838 - Tennessee Telegraph newspaper begins publication.
- 1840 - Population: 1,069.
- 1841 - Union University founded.
- 1850 - Population: 1,917.
- 1851
  - Nashville and Chattanooga Railroad begins operating.
  - Murfreesboro Female Institute founded.
- 1859 - Eaton College active.
- 1860 - Population: 2,861.
- 1862 - December 31: Battle of Stones River begins near Murfreesboro during the American Civil War.
- 1869 - Murfreesboro News in publication.
- 1870 - Population: 3,502.
- 1872 - Evergreen Cemetery established.
- 1880 - Population: 3,800.
- 1890 - Population: 3,739.
- 1892 - Murfreesboro Street Railway begins operating.
- 1899 - News-Banner newspaper begins publication.
- 1900 - Population: 3,999.

== 20th century ==
- 1907 - Tennessee College for Women opens.
- 1910 - Population: 4,679.
- 1911 - Middle Tennessee State Normal School opens.
- 1913 - March 21: Cyclone.
- 1920 - Population: 5,367.
- 1927
  - Carnation milk factory in business.
  - Stones River National Battlefield (historic site) established near Murfreesboro.
- 1930 - Population: 7,993.
- 1931 - Daily News Journal in publication.
- 1940
  - Roxy Theatre in business.
  - Population: 9,495.
- 1946 - Radio tower erected.
- 1947 - WGNS radio begins broadcasting.
- 1948 - Linebaugh Public Library opens.
- 1950 - Population: 13,052.
- 1951
  - Gulch "slums" razed during urban renewal Broad Street Development Project.
  - Swartzbaugh equipment manufactory in business.
- 1953 - WMTS radio begins broadcasting.
- 1959 - Oaklands Historic House Museum established.
- 1960 - Population: 18,991.
- 1965 - Middle Tennessee State University active.
- 1968 - March 22: Snowstorm.
- 1970
  - Westvue urban renewal begins.
  - Population: 26,360.
- 1974 - Carnation milk factory closes.
- 1975 - Marbro Drive-In cinema in business.
- 1976 - Cannonsburgh Village (museum) established.
- 1980 - Population: 32,845.
- 1990 - Population: 44,922.
- 1995 - July 22: "Six people attending an outdoor carnival in Murfreesboro are injured when lightning strikes a nearby power pole."
- 2000 - Population: 68,816.

== 21st century ==
- 2001 - April 15: "High winds topple the steel radio tower for WGNS-AM."
- 2003 - Lincoln Davis becomes U.S. representative for Tennessee's 4th congressional district.
- 2009 - April: Tornado.
- 2010 - Population: 108,755.
- 2011 - Scott DesJarlais becomes U.S. representative for Tennessee's 4th congressional district.
- 2014
  - Shane McFarland becomes mayor.
  - "Murfreesboro 2035" city planning process begins.
- 2020 - Population 152,769.

== See also ==
- Murfreesboro history
- List of mayors of Murfreesboro, Tennessee
- National Register of Historic Places listings in Rutherford County, Tennessee
- Timelines of other cities in Tennessee: Chattanooga, Clarksville, Knoxville, Memphis, Nashville

== Bibliography ==
- "Murfreesboro". Tennessee State Gazetteer and Business Directory for 1860-61. Nashville: John L. Mitchell. 1860.
- Joseph Buckner Killebrew; Tennessee Bureau of Agriculture (1874), "Middle Tennessee: Rutherford County", Introduction to the Resources of Tennessee, vol. 2, Nashville: Tavel, Eastman & Howell (Includes information about Murfreesboro)
- "Murfreesboro". Tennessee State Gazetteer and Business Directory. Nashville: R.L. Polk & Co. 1876.
- C.C. Henderson (1929), Story of Murfreesboro, News-Banner
- Federal Writers' Project (1939), "Murfreesboro", Tennessee: a Guide to the State, American Guide Series, New York: Viking, hdl:2027/mdp.39015066068928 – via HathiTrust
- Rutherford County Historical Society Publication, Murfreesboro: Rutherford County Historical Society, 1973
  - no.2, 1973; no.4, 1974; no.14, 1980; no.24, 1985; no.34, 1994
- Homer Pittard, ed. (1976). "Last Stage from Jefferson: the Development of Rutherford County". Griffith! a Bicentennial Publication. Rutherford County Bicentennial Commission. OCLC 4239091.
- Mabel Pittard (1984). Robert E. Corlew, III (ed.). Rutherford County. Tennessee County History Series. Memphis State University Press. OCLC 6820526. (Includes information about Murfreesboro)
