= Timeline of Memphis, Tennessee =

Coordinates: 35.117°N 89.971°W

The following is a timeline of the history of the city of Memphis, Tennessee, US.

== Prior to 19th century ==
- 1739 – Fort Assumption built by French.
- 1740 – Fort Assumption abandoned.
- 1795 -1797 – Spanish Fort San Fernando De Las Barrancas.
- 1797 – U.S. fort built.

== 19th century ==
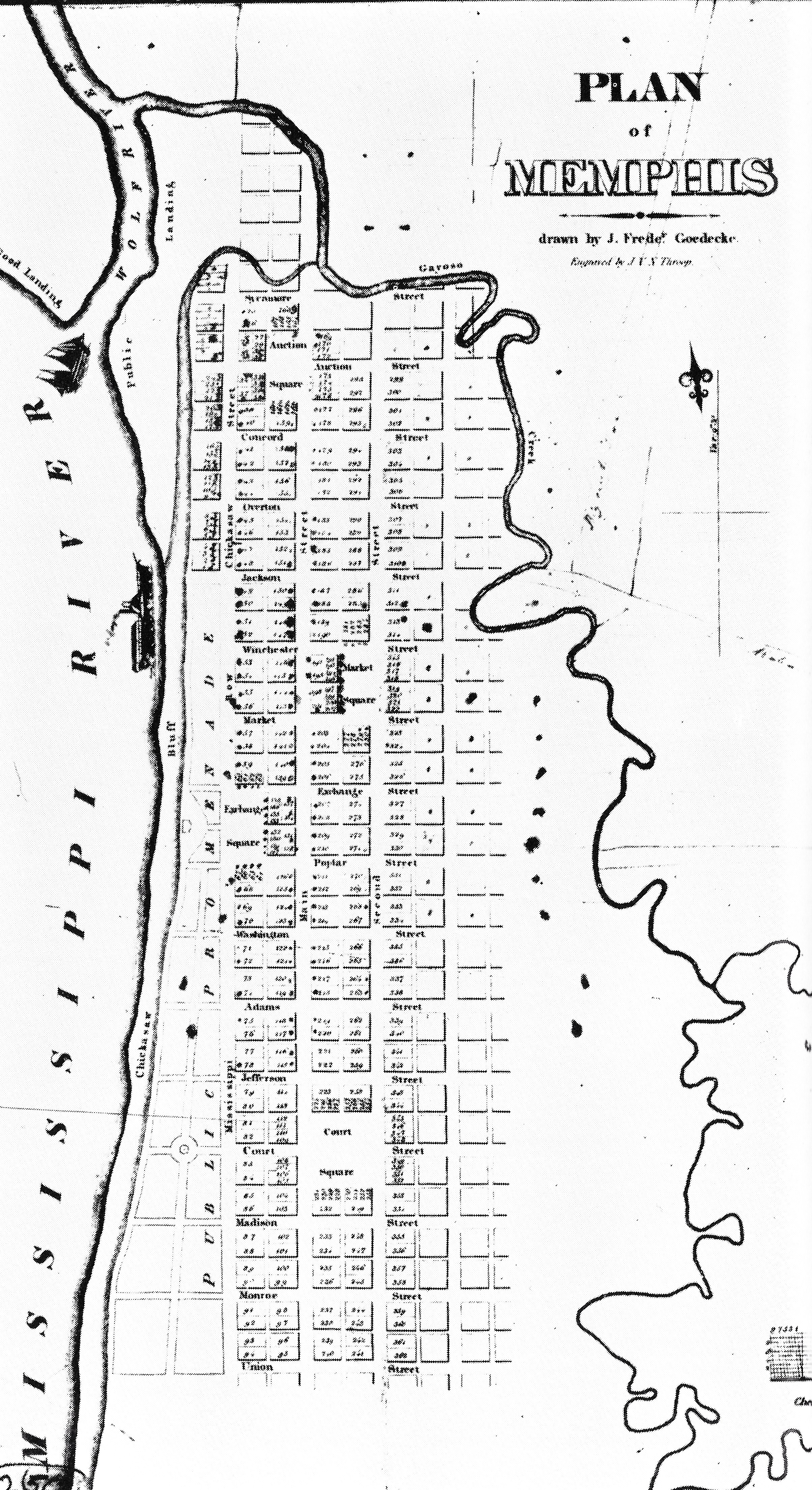
The original plan for Memphis, as surveyed in 1819.

- 1819 – Town laid out.
- 1826 – Town incorporated.
- 1827
  - Memphis Advocate newspaper begins publication.
  - Marcus B. Winchester becomes mayor.
- 1836 – Memphis Enquirer newspaper begins publication.
- 1840 – Population: 3,360.
- 1841 – The Appeal newspaper begins publication.
- 1843
  - New Orleans-Memphis telegraph begins operating.
  - Memphis Daily Eagle newspaper begins publication.
- 1844 – Calvary Episcopal Church consecrated.
- 1849 – Memphis incorporated as a city.
- 1850
  - Town designated a port of customs.
  - Population: 8,841.
- 1852 – Elmwood Cemetery established.
- 1853 – Congregation B'nai Israel founded.
- 1854 – Jones & Co. chemists in business.
- 1855 – German Benevolent Society formed.
- 1857 – Memphis & Charleston Railroad completed.
- 1858 – Memphis Daily Avalanche newspaper begins publication.
- 1860 – Population: 22,623.
- 1861 – Memphis and Ohio Railroad completed.
- 1862
  - Tennessee capital relocated to Memphis from Nashville.
  - June 6: First Battle of Memphis takes place on Mississippi River near town; Union forces take Memphis.
- 1864
  - August 21: Second Battle of Memphis.
  - First National Bank of Memphis established.
- 1866
  - May: Racial unrest.
  - Greenwood School established.
  - Memphis Post begins publication.

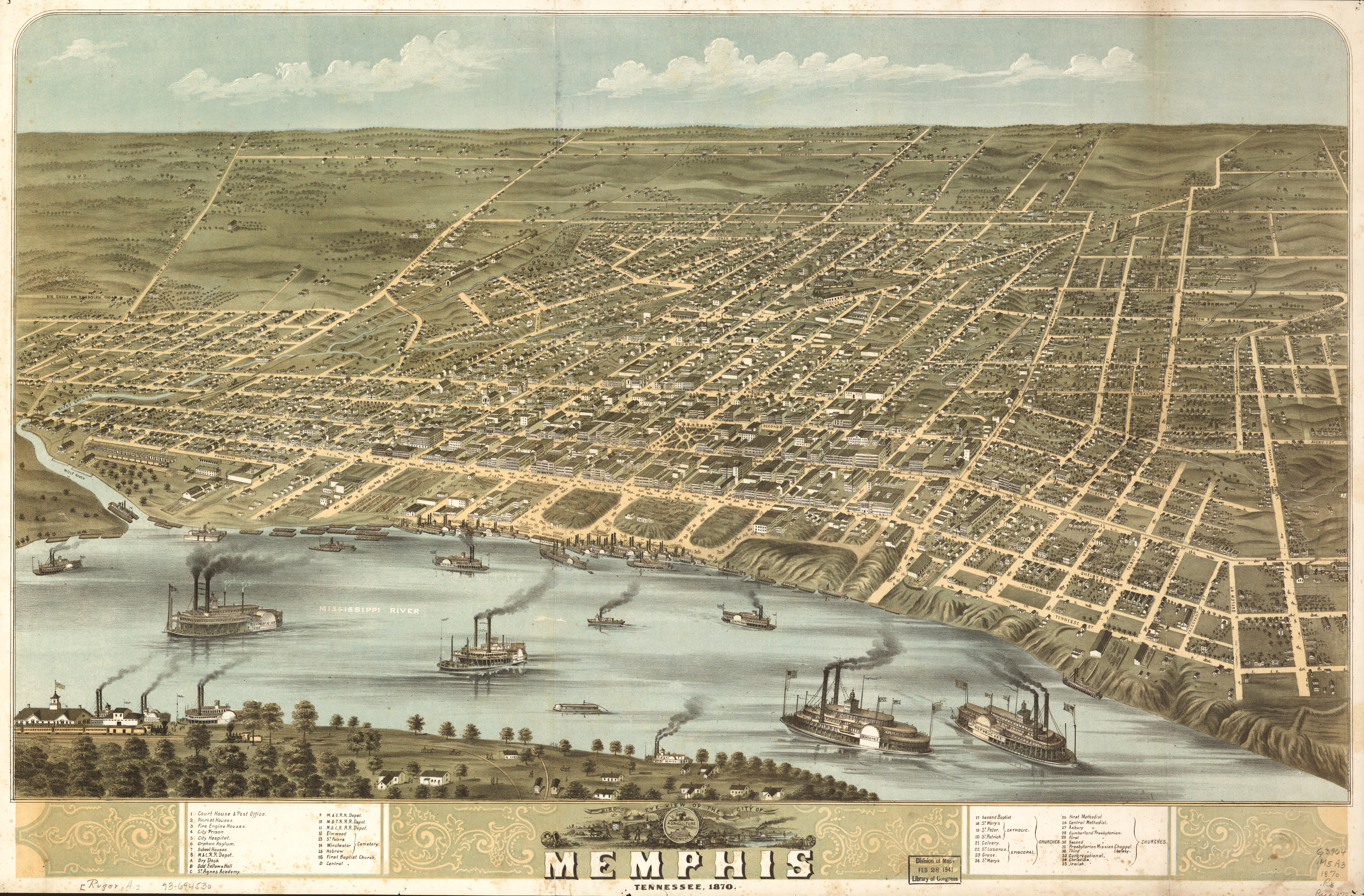
Historic aerial view of Memphis (1870)

- 1868 – Peabody Hotel in business.
- 1870
  - Goldsmith's store in business.
  - Population: 40,226.
- 1871
  - LeMoyne Normal Institute and College of Christian Brothers established.
  - St. Mary's Episcopal Cathedral consecrated.
- 1873 – Yellow fever epidemic.
- 1874 – Memphis Cotton Exchange founded.
- 1875 – Southwestern at Memphis (college) established.
- 1878 – Yellow fever epidemic.
- 1879 – Yellow fever epidemic.

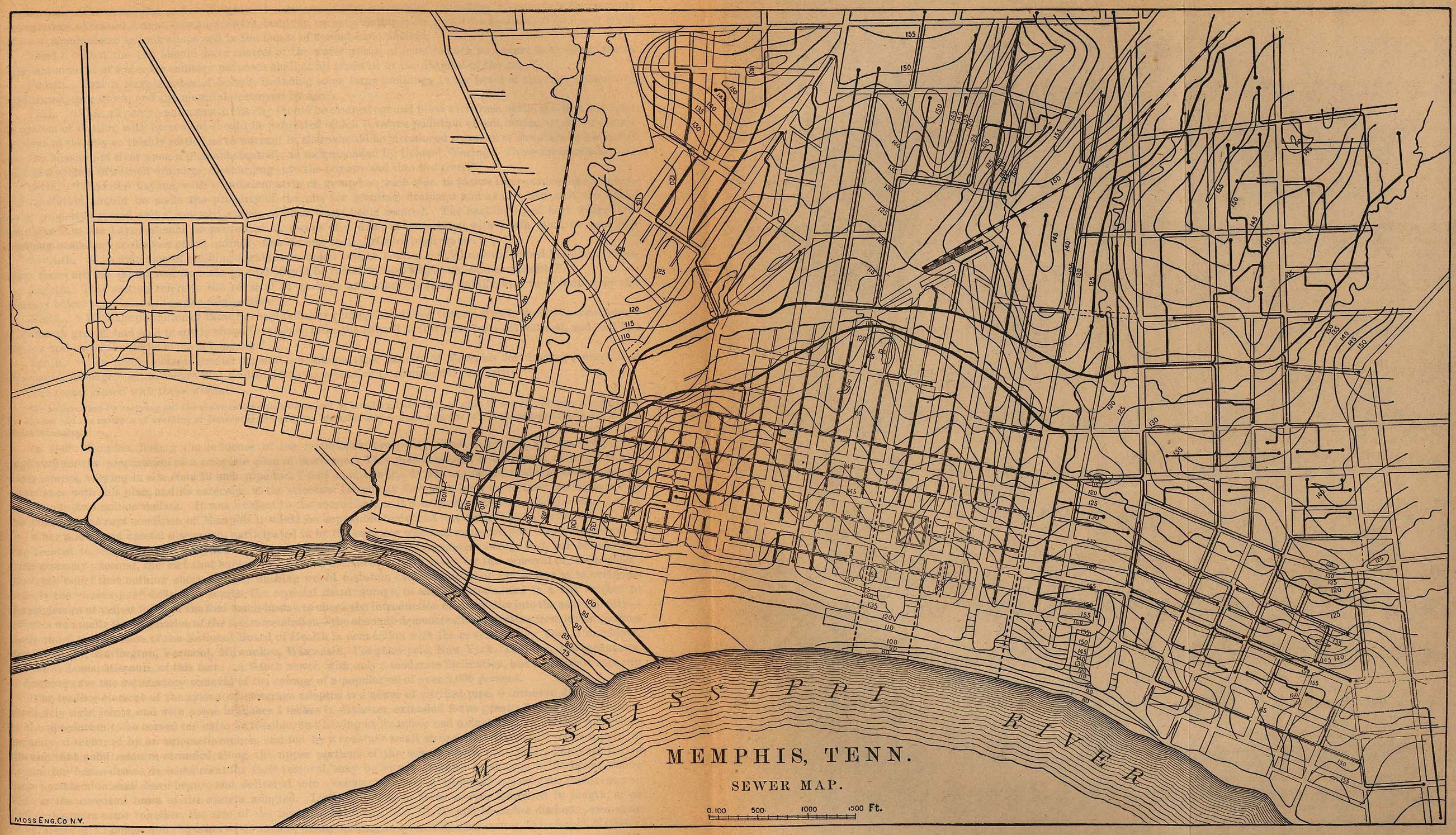
Plan of the Memphis sewer system in 1880

- 1880
  - Sewer system construction begins
  - Population: 33,592.
- 1882
  - Tabernacle Missionary Baptist Church established.
  - Chickasaw Cooperage Company incorporated.
- 1883 – Young Men's Christian Association chartered.
- 1885 – Peoples Grocery in business.
- 1887 – Memphis National Bank organized.
- 1890
  - Nineteenth Century Club formed.
  - Population: 64,589.
- 1891 – City chartered again.
- 1892 – Frisco Bridge (a cantilevered through truss bridge) constructed.
- 1899 – Manassas High School established.
- 1900 – Population: 102,320.

== 20th century ==
=== 1900s–1940s ===
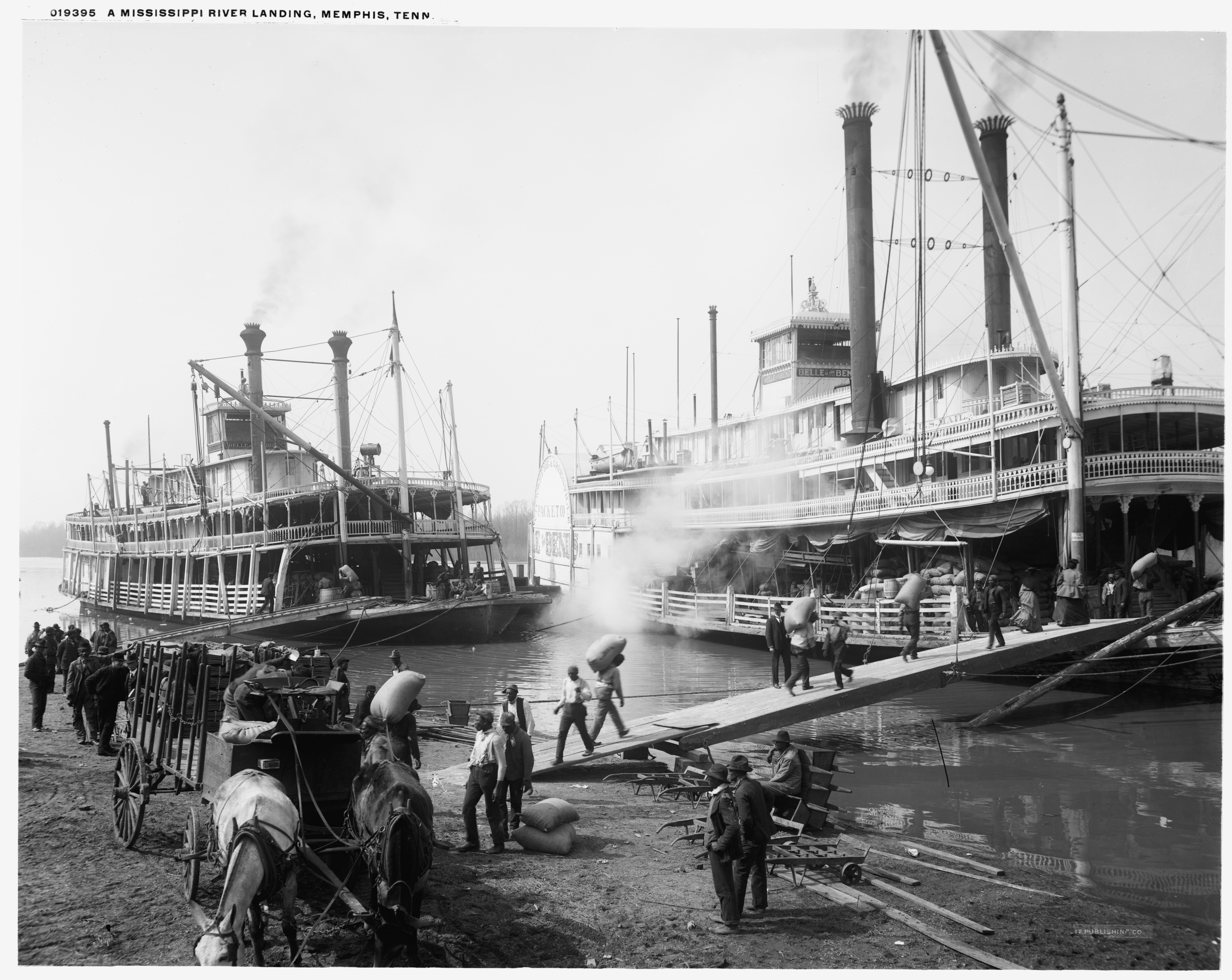
Mississippi riverboats (1906)

- 1905 – Madison Hotel built.
- 1906 – Memphis Zoo and Overton Park established.
- 1909 – Bureau of Municipal Research active (approximate date).
- 1910
  - Commission form of government begins.
  - Exchange Building constructed.
  - E. H. Crump becomes mayor.
  - Population: 131,105.

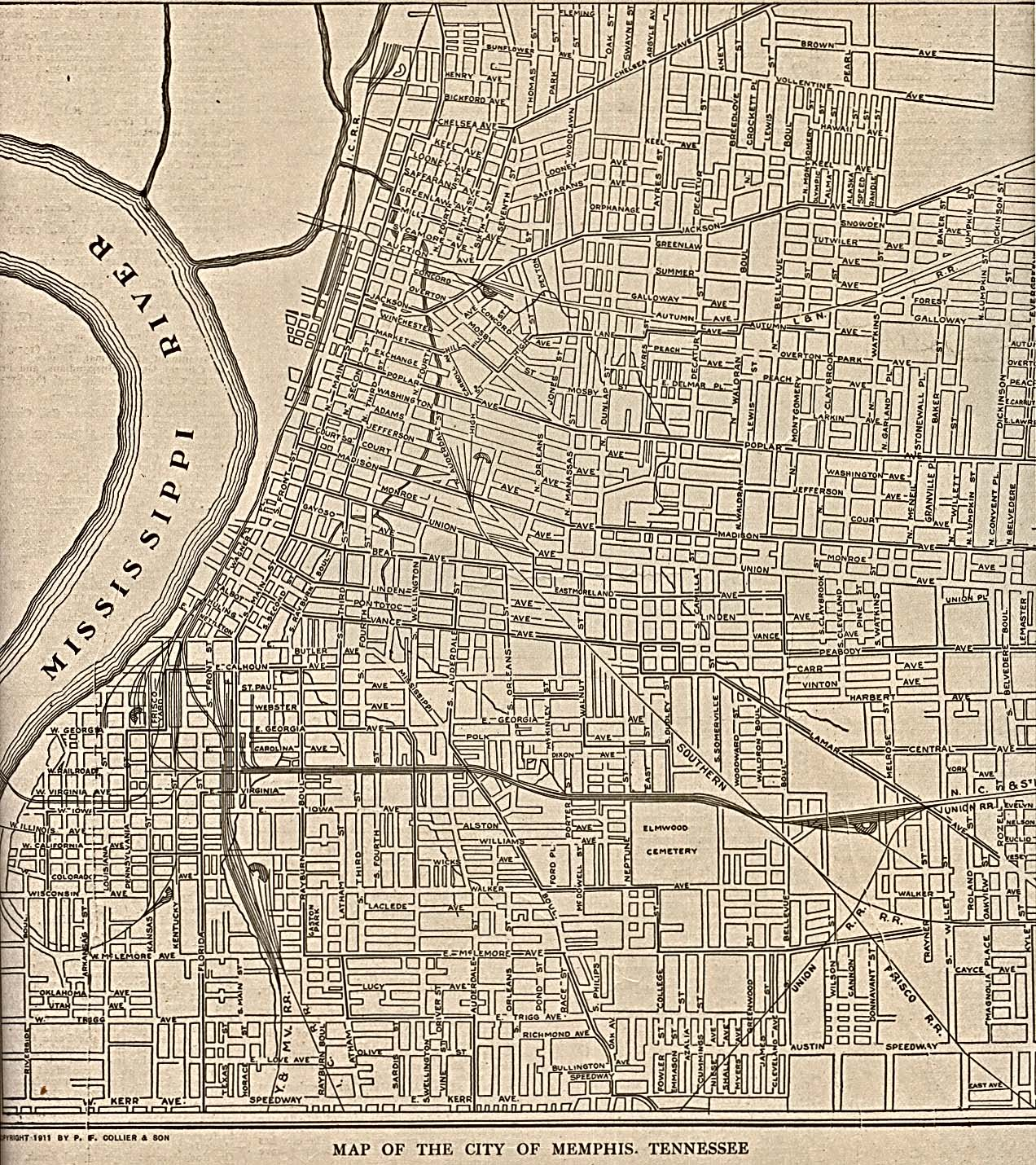
Map of Memphis in 1911

- 1911 – Urban League branch established.
- 1912 – Handy's The Memphis Blues (song) published.
- 1914 – Union Avenue United Methodist Church built.
- 1915 – Guthrie Elementary School founded.
- 1916
  - Harahan Bridge opens to West Memphis, Arkansas.
  - Memphis Brooks Museum of Art established.
  - Piggly Wiggly grocery in business.
- 1917
  - May 22: Lynching of Ell Persons.
  - National Association for the Advancement of Colored People branch established.
- 1919 – Citizens' Co-operative Stores incorporated.
- 1920
  - City hosts Commission on Interracial Cooperation Women's Interracial Conference.
  - Population: 162,351.
- 1921
  - Mississippi Boulevard Christian Church established.
- 1922
  - WREC radio begins broadcasting.
- 1923 – WMC radio begins broadcasting.
- 1924 – Lincoln American Tower built.
- 1925 – WHBQ and WMPS radio begin broadcasting.
- 1929 – Memphis Municipal Airport dedicated.
- 1930
  - Memphis Museum of Natural History and Industrial Arts opens.
  - Sterick Building constructed.
  - Population: 253,143.
- 1931
  - Memphis World newspaper begins publication.
  - Cotton Carnival begins.
- 1932 – Memphis Times newspaper begins publication.
- 1936 – Memphis Academy of Art founded.
- 1937 – Firestone factory in operation in Hyde Park.
- 1938 – Cathedral of the Immaculate Conception built.
- 1939 – First Colored Baptist Church built.
- 1940 – Population: 292,942.
- 1941 – Mason Temple built.
- 1945 – Lorraine Motel in business.
- 1946
  - Douglass High School opens.
  - Tri-State Bank established.
- 1947 – WDIA radio begins broadcasting.
- 1948
  - WMCT (television) begins broadcasting.
  - 13 year old Elvis Presley moves to Memphis.

=== 1950s–1990s ===
- 1950 – Population: 396,000.
- 1953 – WHBQ-TV (television) begins broadcasting.
- 1955 – WHER radio begins broadcasting.
- 1956
  - WREG-TV (as WREC-TV) (television) begins broadcasting.
  - Opera Memphis established.
- 1957 – Satellite Records in business.
- 1960 – Population: 497,524.
- 1961
  - Thirteen African American first graders join Memphis City Schools
  - Henry Loeb becomes mayor.
- 1965 – 100 North Main building and White Station Tower constructed.

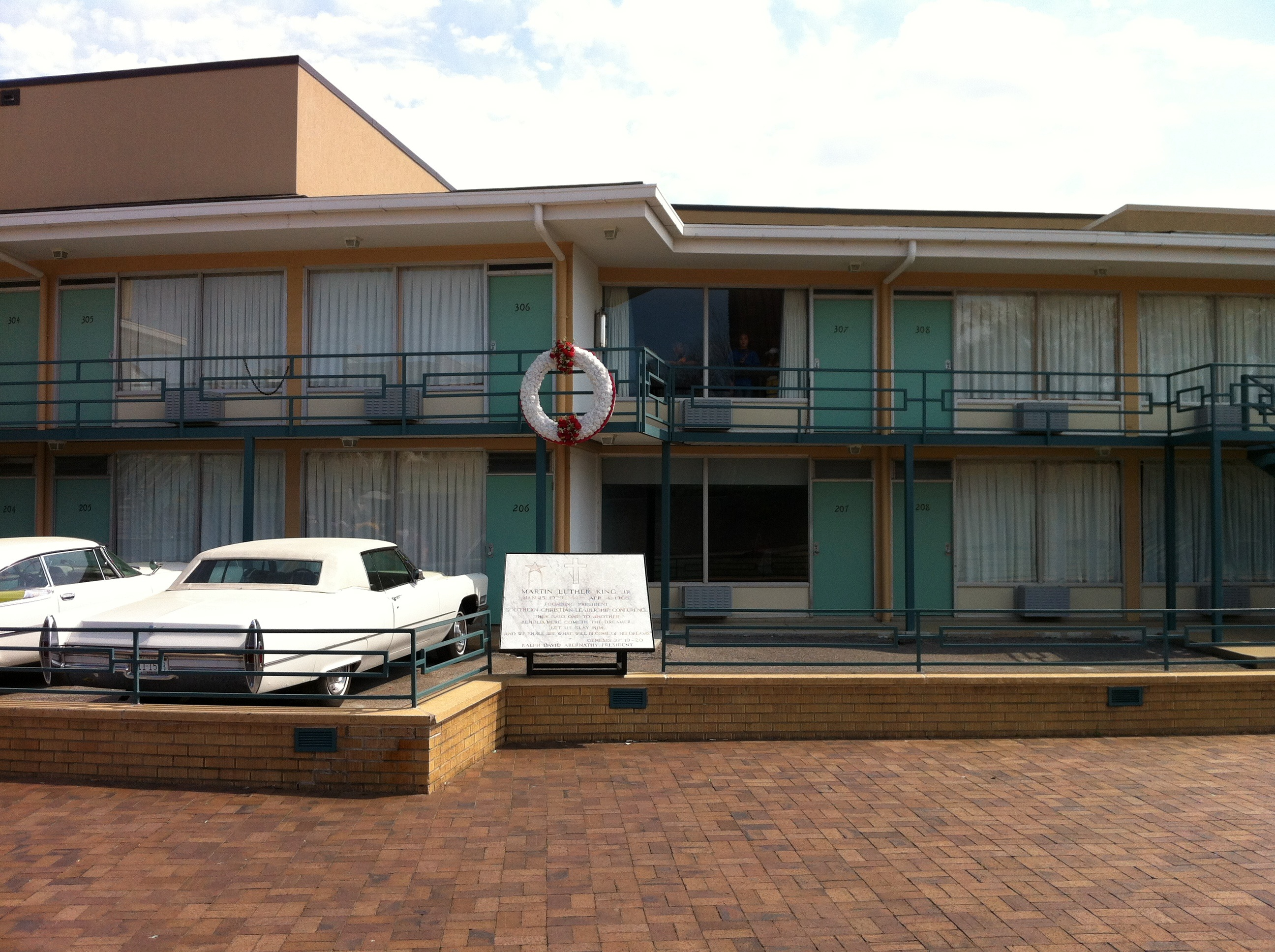
Lorraine Motel, site of the 1968 Martin Luther King, Jr. assassination

- 1968
  - January: Henry Loeb becomes mayor again.
  - February 11: Memphis sanitation strike begins.
  - April 3: Martin Luther King, Jr. delivers I've Been to the Mountaintop speech.
  - April 4: Assassination of Martin Luther King, Jr.
  - April 8: March in honor of Martin Luther King, Jr.
- 1969 – Sesquicentennial Celebration
- 1970
  - Vollintine-Evergreen Community Association organized.
  - Population: 623,988.
- 1971 – Clark Tower built
- 1972 – National Bank of Commerce building constructed.
- 1973 – May: City hosts Rock Writers of the World Convention.
- Massive white flight occurs in Memphis City Schools.
- Desegregation busing begins in Memphis
- 1974 – Women's Resource Center founded.
- 1975 – Hyatt hotel opens.
- 1976 – Temple Israel built.
- 1977 – Memphis in May festival begins.
- 1978
  - Muslim Society of Memphis founded.
  - Unionized firefighters and police officers conduct several strikes.
- 1980 – Population: 646,174.
- 1985
  - Tall Trees (prison) privatised.
  - Morgan Keegan Tower built.
- 1988 - Memphis tanker truck disaster.
- 1990 – Population: 610,337.
- 1991
  - National Civil Rights Museum and Pyramid Arena open.
  - Willie Herenton becomes mayor.
- 1996 – City website online.
- 2000 – Population: 650,100.

== 21st century ==
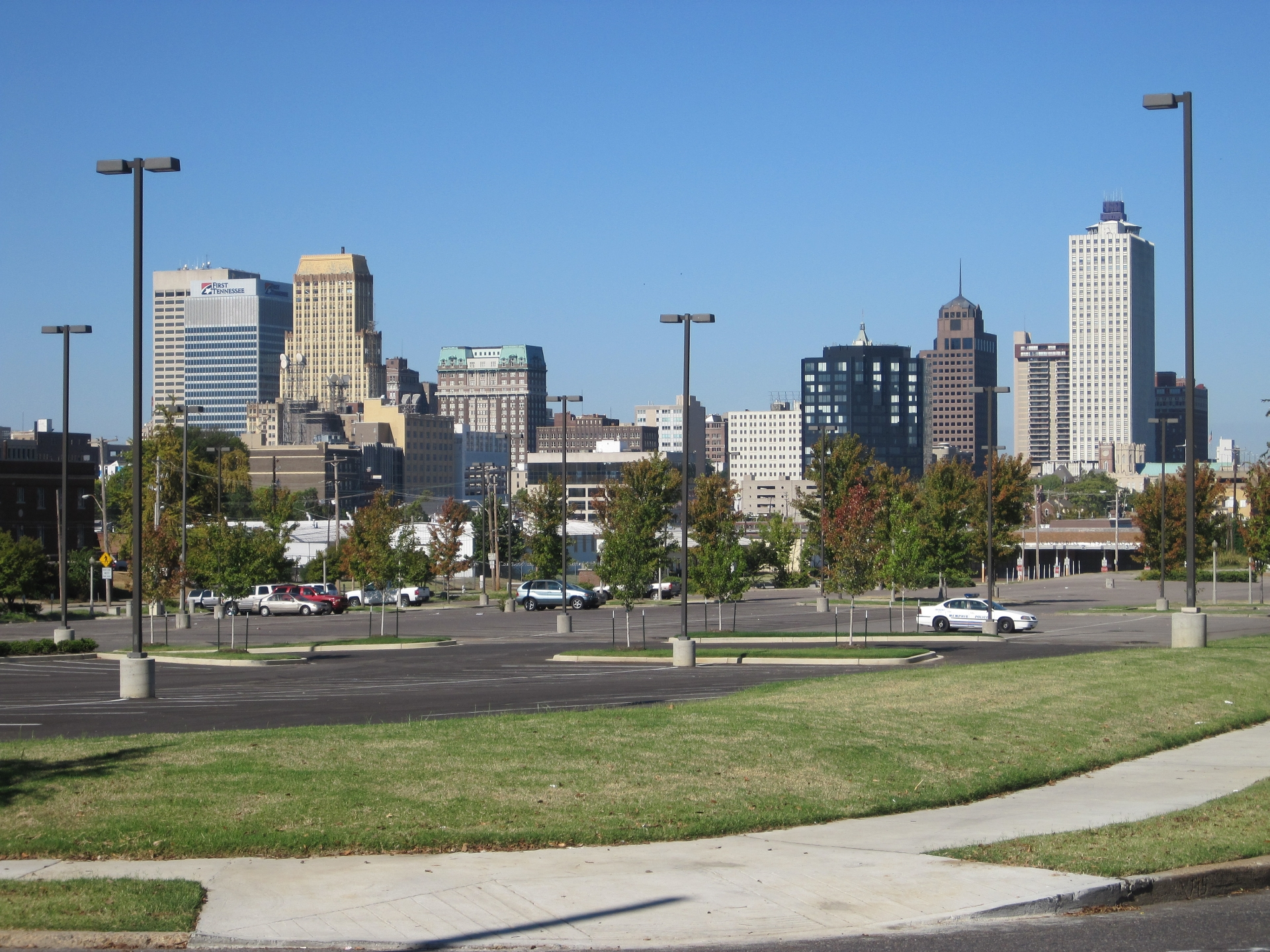
Memphis skyline as seen from Poplar Avenue (2010)

- 2002 – June 8: Lennox Lewis vs. Mike Tyson boxing match.
- 2003
  - Clark Opera Memphis Center opens.
  - July 22: Memphis Summer Storm of 2003, also known as "Hurricane Elvis".
  - December 18: Airplane crash.
- 2007 – Steve Cohen becomes U.S. representative for Tennessee's 9th congressional district.
- 2008 – February 5–6: Tornado outbreak.
- 2009
  - October: A C Wharton elected mayor.
  - City open government standard enacted.
- 2010 – Population: 646,889.
- 2015 – October 8: Jim Strickland elected mayor.
- 2016 – Raleigh Springs Mall is demolished
- 2020 – Population: 633,104.
- 2023 – October 5: Paul Young elected mayor.

== See also ==
- History of Memphis, Tennessee
- List of mayors of Memphis, Tennessee
- National Register of Historic Places listings in Shelby County, Tennessee
- Timelines of other cities in Tennessee: Chattanooga, Clarksville, Knoxville, Murfreesboro, Nashville
- Timeline of Tennessee

== Bibliography ==
=== Published in 19th century ===
- "Memphis", Kimball & James' Business Directory for the Mississippi Valley, Cincinnati: Printed by Kendall & Barnard, 1844
- "Memphis". Tennessee State Gazetteer and Business Directory for 1860–61. Nashville: John L. Mitchell. 1860.
- Denson's Memphis Directory, for 1865. A. Clark Denson. 1865.
- "Memphis". Commercial Directory of the Western States. St. Louis: Richard Edwards. 1867.
- "Mississippi River: Memphis". James' River Guide ... Mississippi Valley. Cincinnati: U.P. James. 1871.
- Joseph Buckner Killebrew; Tennessee Bureau of Agriculture (1874), "Shelby County; County Seat: Memphis", Introduction to the Resources of Tennessee, vol. 2, Nashville: Tavel, Eastman & Howell
- William T. Avery (1876), City of Memphis, Shelby County, Tennessee, OL 23355267M
- "Memphis". Tennessee State Gazetteer and Business Directory for 1876-7. Nashville: R.L. Polk & Co. 1876.
- Commercial and Statistical Review of the City of Memphis, Reilley & Thomas, 1883
- Directory of the Taxing District of Memphis. Memphis, Tenn.: C.F. Weatherbe. 1883.
- "Memphis (2.)" . Encyclopædia Britannica. Vol. 15 (9th ed.). 1883.
- J.M. Keating (1888). History of the City of Memphis Tennessee. Syracuse, NY: D. Mason & Co.
- Memphis, Merchants' Exchange of (1888), Annual Statement of the Trade and Commerce of Memphis, Tenn. ... Reported to the Memphis Merchants' Exchange
- James Phelan (1888), "Memphis", History of Tennessee, Boston: Houghton, Mifflin

=== Published in 20th century ===
- G.P. Hamilton (1908). Bright Side of Memphis: A Compendium of Information Concerning the Colored People of Memphis, Tennessee. Memphis.
- "Memphis", United States (4th ed.), Leipzig: K. Baedeker, 1909, OCLC 02338437
- "Memphis (Tennessee)" . Encyclopædia Britannica. Vol. 18 (11th ed.). 1910. p. 107.
- John Preston Young, ed. (1912), Standard history of Memphis, Tennessee, Knoxville, Tenn: H.W. Crew, OCLC 850900, OL 6553910M
- Federal Writers' Project (1939), "Memphis", Tennessee: a Guide to the State, American Guide Series, New York: Viking, hdl:2027/mdp.39015066068928
- Tennessee Historical Records Survey (1941), "Shelby County (Memphis)", Directory of Churches, Missions, and Religious Institutions of Tennessee, no. 79, Nashville
- Ory Mazar Nergal, ed. (1980), "Memphis", Encyclopedia of American Cities, New York: E.P. Dutton, OL 4120668M
- Michael K. Honey (1993), Southern Labor and Black Civil Rights: Organizing Memphis Workers, Urbana: University of Illinois Press, ISBN 0252020006
- George Thomas Kurian (1994), "Memphis, Tennessee", World Encyclopedia of Cities, vol. 1: North America, Santa Barbara, Calif.: ABC-CLIO, OL 1431653M – via Internet Archive (fulltext)
- "The South: Tennessee: Memphis", USA, Let's Go, New York: St. Martin's Press, 1999, OL 24937240M

=== Published in 21st century ===
- Ernest Withers. Memphis Blues Again. Viking Studio, 2001.
- "Memphis: Mecca on the Mississippi", Ebony, October 2002
- Stephanie Gilmore (2003). "Dynamics of Second-Wave Feminist Activism in Memphis, 1971–1982: Rethinking the Liberal/Radical Divide". National Women's Studies Association Journal. 15 (1): 94–117. JSTOR 4316946.
- John Branston. Rowdy Memphis. Brentwood, Tennessee: Cold Tree Press, 2004.
- Richard Pillsbury, ed. (2006). "Memphis". Geography. New Encyclopedia of Southern Culture. Vol. 2. University of North Carolina Press. p. 176. OCLC 910189354.
- David Goldfield, ed. (2007). "Memphis, Tennessee". Encyclopedia of American Urban History. Sage. ISBN 978-1-4522-6553-7.
- Sharon D. Wright. Race, Power, and Political Emergence in Memphis. Taylor and Francis, 2007.
- Photographs from the Memphis World, 1949–1964. Memphis Brooks Museum of Art. 2008. ISBN 978-0915525102.
- Wanda Rushing (2009). "Memphis: Cotton Fields, Cargo Planes, and Biotechnology". Southern Spaces. doi:10.18737/M7MW37.
- Raj Chetty; Nathaniel Hendren (2015), City Rankings, Commuting Zones: Causal Effects of the 100 Largest Commuting Zones on Household Income in Adulthood, Equality of Opportunity Project, Harvard University, archived from the original on May 6, 2015, "Rank #93: Memphis"
- Gail Schmunk Murray (2017). "Taming the War on Poverty: Memphis as a Case Study". Journal of Urban History. 43.
