= Timeline of Chattanooga, Tennessee =

Coordinates: 35.045556°N 85.267222°W

The following is a timeline of the history of the city of Chattanooga, Tennessee, United States.

== 19th century ==
- 1838 – Cherokee Nation removed from Chattanooga, marched out to 'Indian Territory' (now Oklahoma) on the 'Trail of Tears'
- 1840 – James Enfield Berry becomes mayor.
- 1849 – Western & Atlantic Railroad begins operating.
- 1851 – City chartered.
- 1854 – Nashville & Chattanooga Railway in operation.
- 1860 - Population: 2,545.
- 1862 – June: First Battle of Chattanooga.
- 1863
  - September: Occupation by Union forces begins.
  - November 24: Battle of Lookout Mountain.
  - November 25: Battle of Missionary Ridge.
- 1866
  - March: Occupation by Union forces ends.
  - Chartered as a city.
- 1867 – March: The largest flood in the city's recorded history.
- 1869 – Chattanooga Times newspaper begins publication.
- 1870 - Population: 6,093.
- 1871 - Stanton House was built
- 1880 - Population: 12,892.
- 1882 – Walnut Street Temple dedicated.
- 1886 - University of Tennessee at Chattanooga established.
- 1890
  - Walnut Street Bridge built.
  - Population: 29,100.
- 1900 - Population: 30,154.

== 20th century ==
- 1905 – Chattanooga Public Library opens.
- 1906 - Lynching of Ed Johnson
- 1909 – Hixson High School founded.
- 1910 - Population: 44,604.
- 1917 – Market Street Bridge built.
- 1920 – Population: 57,895.
- 1921 – Tivoli Theatre opens.
- 1923 – Chattanooga Theatre Centre founded.
- 1924 – Memorial Auditorium built.
- 1925 – WDOD radio begins broadcasting.
- 1930 – Population: 119,798.
- 1933 – Chattanooga Free Press newspaper begins publication.
- 1935 – Electric Power Board of Chattanooga established.
- 1937 – Chattanooga Zoo at Warner Park established.
- 1940 – Population: 128,163.
- 1950 – Population: 131,041.
- 1953 – WROM-TV - now WTVC (television) begins broadcasting.
- 1954 – WDEF-TV (television) begins broadcasting.
- 1956 – WRGP-TV - now WRCB (television) begins broadcasting.
- 1959 – Olgiati Bridge built.
- 1960 – Population: 130,009.
- 1961 – Tennessee Valley Railroad Museum founded.
- 1965 - Chattanooga State Community College established.
- 1970 – Population: 119,082.
- 1972 – Twelve Tribes (religious group) and National Knife Museum founded.
- 1975 – Marilyn Lloyd becomes U.S. representative for Tennessee's 3rd congressional district.
- 1980 – Population: 169,565.
- 1983 – Chattanooga African-American Museum established.
- 1983-97 – Gene Roberts began city's longest term as mayor.
- 1984 – Veterans Memorial Bridge built.
- 1986 - Chattanooga School for the Arts & Sciences established.
- 1987 – Fellowship of Southern Writers headquartered in Chattanooga.
- 1989 – Federal judge ordered change in city governance to city council system to allow for more demographically correct African-American political representation in City Council (Brown vs. Board of Commissioners of the City of Chattanooga)
- 1990 – Population: 152,466.
- 1992 – Tennessee Aquarium opened.
- 1995 – International Towing and Recovery Hall of Fame and Museum established.
- 1997
  - City website online (approximate date).
  - Jon Kinsey elected mayor.
- 1999 – Chattanooga Times Free Press newspaper in publication.
- 2000 – Population: 155,554.

== 21st century ==
- 2001 – Bob Corker elected mayor.
- 2005
  - Hunter Museum of American Art building expanded.
  - Ron Littlefield elected mayor.
- 2009 - Ron Littlefield re-elected mayor.
- 2010
  - Electric Power Board's one gigabit per second Internet service began.
  - Population: 167,674.
- 2011
  - Volkswagen Chattanooga Assembly Plant began operating.
  - Chuck Fleischmann elected U.S. representative for Tennessee's 3rd congressional district.
- 2013 – Andy Berke elected mayor.
- 2015 – Lone-wolf terrorist shooting, killed five military members and injuring three others.
- 2017 – Andy Berke re-elected mayor.
- 2020 – Population: 181,099.
- 2021 – Tim Kelly becomes mayor.

== See also ==
- Chattanooga history
- List of mayors of Chattanooga, Tennessee
- Timelines of other cities in Tennessee: Clarksville, Knoxville, Memphis, Murfreesboro, Nashville

== Bibliography ==
Published in the 19th century

- "Chattanooga". Tennessee State Gazetteer and Business Directory for 1860-61. Nashville: John L. Mitchell. 1860.
- R.H. Long (1863), "Chattanooga", Hunt's Gazetteer of the Border and Southern States, Pittsburgh, Pa.: John P. Hunt
- Melville, Herman; Alden, Henry Mills (1868), "Chattanooga, and How We Held It", Harper's New Monthly Magazine, vol. 36, hdl:2027/njp.32101064075607
- Joseph Buckner Killebrew; Tennessee Bureau of Agriculture (1874), "East Tennessee: Hamilton County: Chattanooga", Introduction to the Resources of Tennessee, vol. 1, Nashville: Tavel, Eastman & Howell
- "Chattanooga". Tennessee State Gazetteer and Business Directory. Nashville: R.L. Polk & Company. 1876.
- Z. Harrison (1878), "Chattanooga", Description of the Cincinnati Southern Railway from Cincinnati to Chattanooga, Cincinnati: Spencer & Craig, OCLC 13741078
- J.E. MacGowan (1893). "Chattanooga, Tennessee". East Tennessee: Historical and Biographical. Chattanooga, Tenn.: A.D. Smith & Co. hdl:2027/wu.89077948958. ISBN 9781403500816.
- "Chattanooga", Rand, McNally & Co.'s Handy Guide to the Southeastern States, Chicago: Rand, McNally & Co., 1899 – via Internet Archive

Published in the 20th century

- Thomas E. Murray (1906), Chattanooga, the Mountain City, Chattanooga, Tenn: Chattanooga & Tennessee River Power Co., OCLC 13851806, OL 6969382M
- "Chattanooga" . Encyclopædia Britannica. Vol. 6 (11th ed.). 1910. pp. 7–8.
- Municipal Record, City of Chattanooga. 1911-
- Susie McCarver Webster (1915), Historic City, Chattanooga, Chattanooga: McGowan-Cooke, OCLC 11074742, OL 6583618M
- Federal Writers' Project (1939), "Chattanooga", Tennessee: a Guide to the State, American Guide Series, New York: Viking, pp. 251–269, hdl:2027/mdp.39015066068928
- Tennessee Historical Records Survey (1940), "Hamilton County (Chattanooga)", Directory of Churches, Missions, and Religious Institutions of Tennessee, no. 33, Nashville
- Govan, Gilbert E. and James W. Livingood. The Chattanooga Country 1540-1951, From Tomahawks to TVA (1952). Pp. 509. in-depth local history online
- James W. Livingood (1981). Joy Bailey Dunn (ed.). Hamilton County. Tennessee County History Series. Memphis State University Press. OCLC 6820526. (Includes information about Chattanooga)

Published in the 21st century

- Eric W. Allison; Lauren Peters (2010). "Revitalizing Downtown Case Study: Chattanooga, Tennessee". Historic Preservation and the Livable City. John Wiley & Sons. p. 112+. ISBN 978-0-470-90073-4.
- "Bounding Back: The Chattanooga Story", MetroTrends, Washington DC: Urban Institute, 2011
