= Timeline of Nashville, Tennessee =

City history timeline

Coordinates: 36.166667°N 86.783333°W

The following is a timeline of the history of the city of Nashville, Tennessee, United States.

== Prior to 19th century ==
- 1780
  - Fort Nashborough established.
  - Cumberland Compact signed; Cumberland Association formed.
- 1784 – Nashville established.
- 1785 – Davidson Academy incorporated.
- 1789 – Methodist church built.
- 1796 – Settlement becomes part of the state of Tennessee.
- 1797 – Tennessee Gazette and Mero District Advertiser newspaper begins publication.
- 1800 – Population: 345.

== 19th century ==
- 1806
  - Town incorporated.
  - Joseph Coleman becomes mayor.
- 1812 – Tennessee General Assembly relocates to Nashville from Knoxville.
- 1813 – Nashville Library Co., Inc. established.
- 1817 – Tennessee General Assembly relocates from Nashville to Knoxville.
- 1818
  - Earl's Nashville Museum opens.
  - Population: 3,000 (approximate).
- 1820
  - Christian Church built
  - Population: 3,410.
- 1822 – Nashville City Cemetery established.
- 1823 – Presbyterian church built.
- 1825 – Decker & Dyer Reading Room established.
- 1826
  - Tennessee General Assembly relocates to Nashville from Murfreesboro.
  - Cumberland College opened.
- 1829 – Christ Church built.
- 1830 – Population: 5,566.
- 1831 – Tennessee State Penitentiary built.
- 1833 – Waterworks established.
- 1835 – Tennessee Society for the Diffusion of Knowledge organized.
- 1837 – House of Industry for Females established.
- 1838 – First Baptist Church built.
- 1840 – Population: 6,929.
- 1841 – Mechanics' Library Association formed.
- 1842 – Burns & Co. in business.
- 1843 – Nashville becomes capital of Tennessee.
- 1844 – Tennessee School for the Blind and Mechanics Institute and Library Association established.
- 1845 – Protestant Orphan Asylum established.
- 1847 – St. Mary's Cathedral built.
- 1849 – Merchants' Library and Reading Room and Tennessee Historical Society founded.
- 1850
  - June: Nashville Convention held.
  - Suspension bridge built over the Cumberland River.
  - Population: 10,165.
- 1851
  - Nashville Gas Light Company in operation.
  - Nashville, Chattanooga and St. Louis Railway starts operating.
- 1852
  - Public school system inaugurated.
  - Davidson County Jail built.
- 1854
  - Southern Methodist Publishing House headquartered in Nashville.
  - Tennessee State Library established.
- 1855 – Giers photo studio in business.
- 1856 – Church of the Assumption built.
- 1857 – Davidson County Court House rebuilt.
- 1858 – City Workhouse and Church of St. Ann's built.
- 1859
  - Tennessee State Capitol, draw-bridge, and Central Baptist Church built.
  - Louisville and Nashville Railroad begins operating.
- 1860 - Population: 16,988.
- 1862
  - City under Union control.
  - Fort Negley built.
- 1863 – St. Mary's Catholic Orphan Asylum founded.
- 1864 – December 15–16: Battle of Nashville.
- 1865 – Fisk Free Colored School, Ward Seminary for Young Ladies, and Earhart's Bryant & Stratton's Commercial College established.
- 1866 – Central Tennessee College founded.
- 1867
  - Montgomery Bell Academy opens.
  - Nashville Lyceum Association incorporated.
- 1869 – Howard Chapel built.
- 1870
  - Sulphur Dell ballpark opens.
  - Population: 25,865.
- 1871
  - Tennessee and Pacific Railroad (Lebanon-Nashville) begins operating.
  - Fisk University Jubilee Singers, Library Association, and Nashville Saddlery Company established.
- 1873 – Vanderbilt University established.
- 1874 – Hebrew temple and First Cumberland Presbyterian Church built.
- 1876 – Nashville Banner newspaper begins publication.
- 1880 – Population: 43,350.
- 1884 – Nashville Athletic Club formed.
- 1885 – Industrial School and Query Club (women's group) established.
- 1889
  - The Hermitage museum opens.
  - Boscobel College for Young Ladies established.
  - Peabody Normal College active.
- 1890 – Population: 76,168.
- 1891
  - Nashville Bible School founded.
  - Cumberland Park opened as a horse racing track.
- 1892
  - March 17: St. Patrick's Day Snowstorm dumps 17 inches of snow on the city.
  - Union Gospel Tabernacle built.
  - Maxwell House coffee introduced.
- 1893 - Tennessee Central Railway starts operating.
- 1894 - United Daughters of the Confederacy headquartered in Nashville.
- 1897
  - Tennessee Centennial and International Exposition held.
  - Parthenon opened, a replica of the original, functions as an art museum.
- 1898
  - Howard Library established.
  - Tennessee State Penitentiary rebuilt.
- 1900
  - Meharry Medical College active.
  - Population: 80,865.
  - Polk Place demolished.

== 20th century ==
=== 1900s-1940s ===
- 1904 – Carnegie Library opens.
- 1905 – Centennial Club (women's group) active.
- 1906
  - Tennessee State Fair begins.
  - Nashville Globe newspaper begins publication.
- 1907 – Nashville Tennessean newspaper in publication.
- 1909
  - Sparkman Street Bridge opens.
  - Cumberland College closes.
- 1910
  - Nashville Art Association chartered
  - Hermitage Hotel in business
  - Advance Publishing Company incorporated
  - Population: 110,364
- 1912 - Urban League branch established.
- 1916 – Nashville Housewives League organized.
- 1918
  - July 9: Great Train Wreck of 1918.
  - 1918 influenza epidemic.
- 1920 – Population: 118,342.
- 1922 - Nashville's first radio station, WDAA, signs on
- 1925
  - War Memorial Auditorium dedicated.
  - WSM radio and its Grand Ole Opry begin broadcasting.
  - Belcourt Theatre built.
- 1926 - WLAC radio begins broadcasting.
- 1927
  - Warner Parks open.
  - WSIX radio begins broadcasting.
- 1930
  - First American National Bank formed.
  - Population: 153,866.
- 1931
  - Nashville Children's Theatre established.
  - Parthenon rebuilt.
- 1937
  - Berry Field dedicated. Now Nashville International Airport.
  - Tennessee State Museum established.
- 1940 - Population: 167,402.
- 1941
  - W47NV radio licensed.
  - Iroquois Steeplechase begins.
- 1942 – Acuff-Rose Music and Harveys (department store) in business.
- 1946 – Nashville Symphony founded.

=== 1950s-1990s ===
- 1950
  - WSM-TV begins broadcasting.
  - Population: 174,307.
- 1951
  - Ben West becomes mayor.
  - The Harpeth Hall School opens.
- 1952 - Tennessee Theatre opens.
- 1953 – WSIX-TV begins broadcasting.
- 1954 – WLAC-TV begins broadcasting.
- 1955 - Brothers Owen and Harold Bradley establish Bradley Film and Recording Studio, the first studio in what will become Nashville's Music Row neighborhood.
- 1957
  - Nashville, Chattanooga and St. Louis Railway stops operating.
  - Life & Casualty Tower built.
  - RCA Studios begins operation at the corner of 17th Ave. S. and Hawkins St. It will become known as RCA Studio B.
- 1960
  - Nashville sit-ins for civil rights occur.
  - Cheekwood Museum opens.
  - Population: 170,874.
- 1961 – Country Music Hall of Fame and Museum established.
- 1962
  - WDCN-TV begins broadcasting.
  - Nashville Municipal Auditorium opens.
- 1963
  - City consolidates its government with Davidson County.
  - Metropolitan Council (Nashville) established.
  - Beverly Briley becomes mayor.
- 1964 - American Association for State and Local History headquartered in Nashville.
- 1967 – 100 Oaks Mall in business near city.
- 1968 – Third National Bank Building constructed.
- 1970 - Population: 448,003.
- 1972
  - Fan Fair music festival begins.
  - Opryland USA opens.
- 1974
  - Regions Center (Nashville) built.
  - Grand Ole Opry House opens.
- 1975 – Richard Fulton becomes mayor.
- 1978 - The Nashville Sounds minor-league baseball team plays its inaugural season.
- 1980
  - Tennessee Performing Arts Center opens.
  - Sri Ganesha Temple established.
  - Population: 455,651.
- 1981 – Nashville Opera Guild chartered.
- 1982
  - Foreign trade zone established.
  - Bluebird Cafe opens
- 1983 - Nissan car manufactory begins operating in nearby Smyrna.
- 1985 – Starwood Amphitheatre opens.
- 1986 – Tennessee Players founded.
- 1987
  - Nashville Airport terminal built.
  - Bill Boner becomes mayor.
- 1988 – Nashville Shakespeare Festival and Nashville Pride begin.
- 1989
  - Nashville Scene begins publication.
  - Prince's Hot Chicken Shack in business (approximate date).
- 1990
  - Grassmere Wildlife Park established.
  - Population: 488,374.
- 1991 – Phil Bredesen becomes mayor.
- 1994
  - City website online.
  - South Central Bell Building constructed.
  - American Airlines begins nonstop service between London and Nashville.
- 1996
  - Bicentennial Mall State Park opens.
  - Magdalene program for women, and Nashville Zoo at Grassmere established.
  - Nashville Arena built.
- 1998
  - April 15–16: Tornado.
  - After playing in Memphis for one season, the Tennessee Oilers football team plays its first Nashville games at Vanderbilt Stadium.
  - Nashville Predators ice hockey team formed.
- 1999
  - Adelphia Coliseum opens.
  - Bill Purcell becomes mayor.
  - Al Gore presidential campaign, 2000 headquartered in city.
- 2000
  - The City Paper begins publication.
  - Population: 545,524.

== 21st century ==
- 2001
  - Tennessee Immigrant Rights Coalition headquartered in city.
  - Frist Center for the Visual Arts established.
- 2002 Nashville Public Education Foundation established by Nelson C. Andrews and Thomas J. Sherrard
- 2003 – Shelby Street pedestrian bridge opens.
- 2006
  - Schermerhorn Symphony Center opens.
  - Viridian Tower built.
  - Car manufacturer Nissan's North American headquarters in business in nearby Franklin.
- 2007 – Karl Dean becomes mayor.
- 2008 – Nashville for All of Us (group) organized.
- 2009
  - Third Man Records in business.
  - The Pinnacle at Symphony Place built.
  - Live on the Green begins.
  - Voters reject Nashville English Only Amendment.
- 2010
  - April–May: Flood.
  - Population: 601,222.
- 2011
  - October: Occupy Nashville begins.
  - Parnassus Books in business.
- 2012
  - March: Occupy Vanderbilt begins.
  - MyCity Academy (government program) established.
  - Fictional Nashville TV series makes national premiere on ABC, transfers to CMT in 2016 after being canceled by the former and due to fan efforts
- 2013 – Music City Center opens.
- 2015
  - Construction begins on 505 skyscraper.
  - Megan Barry becomes mayor.
- 2016 – The 2016 NHL All-Star Game is hosted in Bridgestone Arena.
- 2018 – Flights to Heathrow Airport out of BNA begin, marking the first transatlantic flights since 1995.
- 2019 – The 2019 NFL draft is hosted on Lower Broadway.
- 2020
  - Population: 689,447
  - Nashville SC begins play in Major League Soccer, the highest tier of association football in the United States.
  - Tornado outbreak of March 2-3, 2020: 22 people killed in tornadoes in Tennessee and Kentucky; the Nashville EF-3 tornado, which kills 4, north of downtown, somewhat mirrors the 1998 tornado's path
  - The Nashville bombing occurs, injuring eight people and causing major damage
- 2023
  - The 2023 NHL Entry Draft is hosted in Bridgestone Arena.
  - The Covenant School shooting occurs, killing six people and the perpetrator.
  - Freddie O'Connell becomes mayor.
- 2024
  - Construction on the New Nissan Stadium begins.
  - Oracle Corporation announces it will relocate its headquarters to Nashville.
  - O'Connell's $3.1 billion "Choose How You Move" transit plan is announced.
- 2025
  - Nonstop flights to Dublin and Keflavík begin.
  - Construction on future tallest building Paramount Tower begins.
  - Nashville SC wins its first trophy by beating Austin FC in the 2025 U.S. Open Cup final.
  - The Tennessee Performing Arts Center announces a new $620 million facility on the East Bank.
- 2026
  - Flights on Southwest Airlines to Juan Santamaría International Airport in San José, Costa Rica begin, the first to Central America out of BNA.
  - Starbucks announces its Southeastern United States headquarters will be built in Nashville.
  - Nashville and New Nissan Stadium are unanimously awarded Super Bowl LXIV.

== See also ==
- History of Nashville, Tennessee
- National Register of Historic Places listings in Davidson County, Tennessee
- List of mayors of Nashville, Tennessee
- List of companies based in Nashville
- Nashville sister city timelines: Caen, Magdeburg
- Timelines of other cities in Tennessee: Chattanooga, Clarksville, Knoxville, Memphis, Murfreesboro
- Nashville Market House

== Bibliography ==
=== Published in 19th century ===
- John P. Campbell (1855). Nashville Business Directory. Nashville. hdl:2027/hvd.hn4gzg.
- "Cumberland River: Nashville". James' River Guide ... Mississippi Valley. Cincinnati: U.P. James. 1860. hdl:2027/nyp.33433081817672.
- "History of the Nashville Press". Nashville City and Business Directory, For 1860–61. Vol. 5. Nashville, Tennessee: L.P. Williams & Co. 1860. p. 90. hdl:2027/hvd.hn4gyr.
- R.H. Long (1863), "Nashville", Hunt's Gazetteer of the Border and Southern States, Pittsburgh, Pa.: John P. Hunt
- Singleton's Nashville business directory for 1865, Nashville: Singleton, 1865, OL 23367287M
- Charles E. Robert (1870). Nashville and Her Trade for 1870.
- "Nashville". Tennessee State Gazetteer and Business Directory. Nashville: R.L. Polk & Company. 1876 – via Google Books.
- Charles Edwin Robert, ed. (1880). Nashville City Guide Book. Nashville TN: Wheeler Brothers.
- Nashville Directory. Nashville: Marshall & Bruce. 1880 – via Internet Archive.
- Nashville Directory. Nashville, Tennessee: Marshall & Bruce. 1881 – via Internet Archive.
- "Nashville" . Encyclopædia Britannica. Vol. 17 (9th ed.). 1884.
- A.S. Colyar (October 1889). "Nashville". New England Magazine.
- John Wooldridge, ed. (1890). History of Nashville, Tennessee. Nashville, Tennessee: Publishing House of the Methodist Episcopal Church, South. LCCN 76027605.
- The Wayne Hand-book of Nashville, and the Tennessee Centennial + Exposition, Ft. Wayne, Ind: Wayne Publishing Company, 1897, OCLC 12548494, OL 271295M
- Jane Henry Thomas (1897), Old days in Nashville, Tenn., Nashville, Tenn: Publishing House Methodist Episcopal Church, South, OL 23322941M

=== Published in 20th century ===
==== 1900s-1940s ====
- Centennial Album of Nashville, Tennessee, Nashville: J. Prousnitzer & Company, 1906, OL 23375657M
- Dau's blue book of selected names of Nashville and suburbs. Dau's Nashville blue book. Dau Publishing Company. 1907. hdl:2027/uva.x004274254.
- The charter of the city of Nashville, Nashville: McQuiddy Printing Co., 1909, OCLC 7184909, OL 13999509M
- "Nashville" . Encyclopædia Britannica. Vol. 19 (11th ed.). 1910. pp. 246–247.
- Social Directory, Nashville, Tennessee. Cumberland Press. 1911.
- All about Nashville, Nashville, Tenn: Marshall & Bruce Co., 1912, OL 24157761M
- "Nashville". Automobile Blue Book. USA. 1919. Map
- The charter of the city of Nashville, Nashville, Tenn: Ambrose, 1921, OCLC 10981902, OL 13999515M
- F. Garvin Davenport (1937). "Cultural Life in Nashville on the Eve of the Civil War". Journal of Southern History. 3.
- Federal Writers' Project (1939), "Nashville", Tennessee: a Guide to the State, American Guide Series, New York: Viking, hdl:2027/mdp.39015066068928
- Tennessee Historical Records Survey (1940), "Davidson County (Nashville)", Directory of Churches, Missions, and Religious Institutions of Tennessee, no. 19, Nashville
- William Henry McRaven (1949), Nashville, Athens of the South, Chapel Hill: Scheer & Jervis, OCLC 1397316

==== 1950s-1990s ====
- Daniel R. Grant (1955). "Urban and Suburban Nashville: A Case Study in Metropolitanism". Journal of Politics. 17.
- Eleanor Graham (1957). "Nashville Community Study". Peabody Journal of Education. 35.
- Egerton, John (1979). Nashville: The Faces of Two Centuries, 1780–1980. Nashville, Tennessee: PlusMedia. LCCN 79089173.
- Doyle, Don H. (1985). Nashville Since the 1920s
- Frank Burns (1989). Robert B. Jones (ed.). Davidson County. Tennessee County History Series. Memphis State University Press. OCLC 6820526. (Includes information about Nashville)
- Anita Shafer Goodstein (1989), Nashville, 1780-1860: from frontier to city, Gainesville: University of Florida Press, ISBN 0813009405
- Don Harrison Doyle (1990), New Men, New Cities, New South: Atlanta, Nashville, Charleston, Mobile, 1860-1910, Chapel Hill: University of North Carolina Press, ISBN 0807818836
- Robert G. Spinney (1995). "Municipal Government in Nashville, Tennessee, 1938-1951: World War II and the Growth of the Public Sector". Journal of Southern History. 61.
- Lovett, Bobby L. (1999). African-American History of Nashville, Tennessee, 1780–1930: Elites and Dilemmas. University of Arkansas Press. ISBN 1-55728-555-1.
- Carey, Bill (2000). Fortunes, Fiddles, & Fried Chicken: A Nashville Business History. Franklin, Tennessee: Hillsboro Press. ISBN 1-57736-178-4.

=== Published in 21st century ===
- Egerton, John; Wood, E. Thomas, eds. (2001). Nashville: An American Self-Portrait. Nashville, Tennessee: Beaten Biscuit Press. ISBN 0-9706702-1-4.
- Duke, Jan (2005). Historic Photos of Nashville. Nashville, Tennessee: Turner Publishing. ISBN 978-1-59652-184-1.
- Richard Pillsbury, ed. (2006). "Nashville". Geography. New Encyclopedia of Southern Culture. Vol. 2. University of North Carolina Press. p. 180. OCLC 910189354.
- Southern Foodways Alliance, University of Mississippi (2006), Camp Nashville: A Bibliography of Music City and Meat-N-Threes
- Padgett, David A. (2007). "Nashville". In Bullard, Robert D. (ed.). Growing Smarter: Achieving Livable Communities, Environmental Justice, and Regional Equity. MIT Press. p. 127. ISBN 978-0-262-52470-4.
- McGuire, Jim (2007). Historic Photos of the Opry: Ryman Auditorium 1974. Nashville, Tennessee: Turner Publishing. ISBN 978-1-59652-373-9.
- Zepp, George R. (2009). Hidden History of Nashville. Charleston, South Carolina: History Press. ISBN 978-1-59629-792-0.
- Haugen, Ashley Driggs (2009). Historic Photos of Nashville in the 50s, 60s and 70s. Nashville, Tennessee: Turner Publishing. ISBN 978-1-59652-539-9.
- Anthony J. Nownes, David J. Houston, and Marc Schwerdt (2010). "An assessment of the city-county consolidation of Nashville and Davidson County, Tennessee". In Suzanne M. Leland; Kurt Thurmaier (eds.). City-County Consolidation: Promises Made, Promises Kept?. Georgetown University Press. ISBN 978-1-58901-622-4.
- Houston, Benjamin (2012). The Nashville Way: Racial Etiquette and the Struggle for Social Justice in a Southern City. Athens, Georgia: University of Georgia Press. ISBN 978-0-8203-4327-3.
- Lloyd, Richard; Christens, Brian D. (2012). "Reaching for Dubai: Nashville Dreams of a Twenty-First-Century Skyline". In Peterson, Marina; McDonogh, Gary (eds.). Global Downtowns. City in the Twenty-First Century. University of Pennsylvania Press. ISBN 978-0-8122-0805-4.
