= Tennessee House of Representatives 76th district =

State legislative district in Tennessee

Tennessee's 76th State House of Representatives district
- Map of Tennessee House districts with the 76th District shaded in red
Representative
Tandy Darby; R–Greenfield
since 2021
- Demographics: 84% White; 8.3% Black; 3.1% Hispanic; 1% Asian; 3.1% Multiracial
- Population (2024): 67,222

The Tennessee House of Representatives 76th district is one of the 99 legislative districts in the lower house of the Tennessee General Assembly. The district is located in West Tennessee and covers Crockett, Lauderdale, and parts of Gibson and Obion counties. The district includes Martin, Dresden, McKenzie and part of Paris. It also includes Greenfield, Trezevant, Gleason, Henry, Puryear, and Bruceton. Much of the district is unincorporated and largely rural. Tandy Darby has represented the district since 2021.

== Demographics ==
The Tennessee Comptroller estimates the population as of 2024 at 67,222.

- 84% of the district is White
- 8.3% of the district is Black
- 3.1% of the district is Hispanic
- 1% of the district is Asian
- 0.1% of the district is some other race alone
- 3.1% of the district is Two or more races

Detailed demographic information is also available through Census Reporter.

== History ==
The 88th Tennessee General Assembly was the first in which all districts were numbered. At this time, the 76th district was in Henry, and Weakley counties. From the 93rd-107th GAs it was in Weakly, and part of Carroll counties. From the 103rd-107th GAs, it was in Haywood and part of Tipton counties. From the 108th-112th, it was Weakley, and part of Obion and Carroll counties. Since the 113th General Assembly, it has been composed of Weakley, and part of Carroll and Henry counties.

== List of Representatives ==
Representative	Party	Years of Service	General Assembly	Hometown
Tandy Darby	Republican	2021-present	112th-114th	Greenfield
Andy Holt	Republican	2011-2020	107th-111th	Dresden
Mark L. Maddox	Democratic	1997-2010	100th-106th	Dresden
Roy Herron	Democratic	1987-1996	95th-99th	Dresden
Ned McWherter	Democratic	1969-1986	86th-94th	Dresden
