= The Jackson Sun =

Newspaper

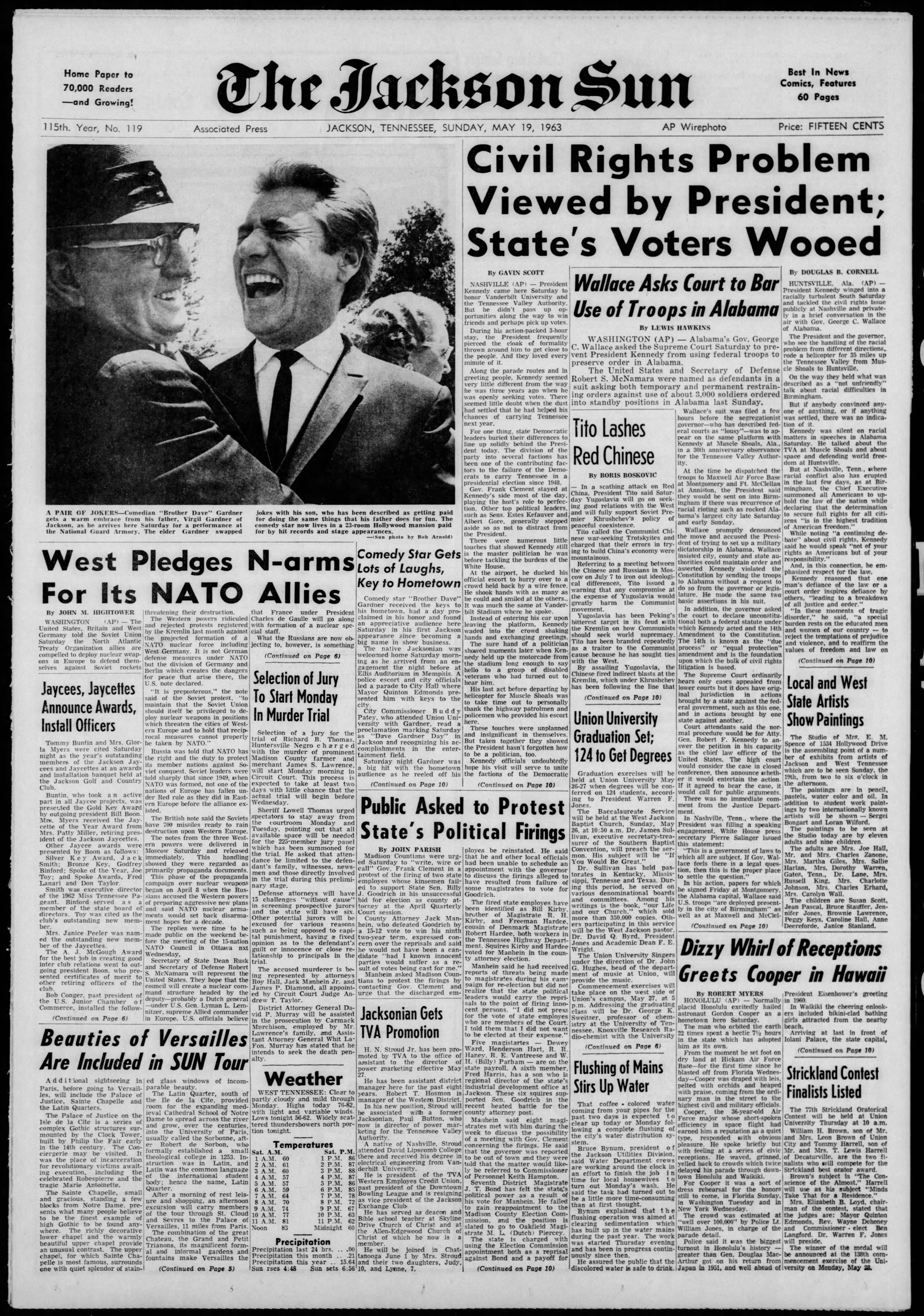
- A representative front page of the Sun in May 1963
- Type: Daily newspaper
- Owner: USA Today Co.
- Language: English
- Circulation: 15,763 Daily; 24,287 Sunday (as of 2013)
- Sister newspapers: The Leaf-Chronicle, The Daily News Journal, The Tennessean
- ISSN: 0890-9938
- Website: jacksonsun.com

The Jackson Sun is a daily newspaper published in Jackson, Tennessee, and is one of western Tennessee's major newspapers, delivered to 13 counties. The newspaper is owned by USA Today Co. Its history dates back over 150 years.

== See also ==
- List of newspapers in Tennessee
