= By the Same Door =

1951 novel by Blanche Chenery Perrin

- Author: Blanche Chenery Perrin
- Language: English
- Publisher: Macmillan Inc. Random House
- Publication date: 1951
- Publication place: United States
- Media type: Print (hardcover)
- Pages: 271

By the Same Door is a 1951 American novel by Blanche Chenery Perrin, first published by Macmillan Inc. in 1951. It was Perrin's second novel, written following a career in advertising.

== Plot ==
Madge Tinton, a beautiful but "thoughtless and flint-hearted" woman driven by material and social-climbing ambitions, discovers that her husband Les is having an affair.

== Reception ==
By the Same Door was a modest critical hit upon release, described as effective but unremarkable by reviewers. Perrin's treatment of her complicated, unlikeable main character was commended by critics: "Madge makes all the mistakes that a self-centered female can make... And yet, because you've seen so many wives like her, you're fascinated by her story."

A reviewer for The Jackson Sun called it "an interesting commentary on present day marriages, written with humor and understanding."

Walter Spearman, writing for the Greensboro Daily News, called it "more mature and equally pleasant" to Perrin's first novel, Deepwood.

The Edmonton Reader advised that "By the Same Door will not stay in the memory, but it's pleasant reading for a summer's afternoon."

A less enthusiastic review from the Binghamton Press and Sun-Bulletin called the novel "tediously written" and said that "if (the story) could have been written in an objective, instead of a personal, vein, it would have made a better novel."
