= Tandy Darby =

American politician (born 1973)

Member of the Tennessee House of Representatives from the 76th district
- Incumbent
- Assumed office January 12, 2021
- Preceded by: Andy Holt

Personal details
- Born: October 11, 1973 (age 53)
- Party: Republican
- Spouse: Kasi
- Children: 3
- Education: University of Tennessee at Martin (BS)
- Website: House website

Tandy Darby (born October 11, 1973) is an American politician serving as a member of the Tennessee House of Representatives from the 76th district. He assumed office on November 3, 2020.

== Early life, education, and career ==
Tandy Darby was born on October 11, 1973. After graduating from the Greenfield School in Greenfield, Tennessee, Darby earned a BS in agricultural business from the University of Tennessee at Martin.

Since 1997, Darby has worked as a salesman for Akin & Porter Produce Inc. In 2008, he co-founded Greenfield Laser Industries, a fabrication business.

== Tennessee House of Representatives (2021–present) ==
Darby was elected to the Tennessee House of Representatives on November 3, 2020. In February 2021, Darby was selected as one of seven deputy whips of the Tennessee House.

In 2023, Darby supported a resolution to expel three Democratic lawmakers from the legislature for violating decorum rules. The expulsion was widely characterized as unprecedented.

In 2025, Darby wrote an op-ed for The Tennessean promoting his legislation to prohibit the state from levying a property tax. The following year, he was chosen to serve as regional chairman of a campaign promoting a state constitutional amendment prohibiting such a tax.
