= Occupy Vanderbilt =

Protest group against economic inequality

- Part of the Occupy movement
- Date: March 19th, 2012 – April 2012
- Location: Nashville, Tennessee; 36.148567,-86.802478
- Caused by: Fair pay for university employees; A responsible endowment; A more democratic student voice
- Goals: A living wage for VU Dining employees; Ethical guidelines for university investments; Creation of an ethical review board for investments, Non-reinvestment in HEI Hotels & Resorts; Non-reinvestment in EMVest
- Methods: Non violent protest; Civil disobedience; Occupation; Picketing; Demonstrations

Occupy Vanderbilt was a collaboration that included demonstrations and an occupation located at Alumni Circle Lawn at Vanderbilt University in Nashville, Tennessee. Occupy Vanderbilt engaged in organized meetings, events and actions through March 2012. The occupation was in solidarity with the global occupy movement and Occupy Nashville, and is notable as the first protest encampment at Vanderbilt, the spread of which in countries like Argentina, Greece and Spain originally inspired the Occupy movement.

== Timeline ==
The following is a timeline of Occupy Vanderbilt events and activity.

- Mar. 19, 2012: Occupy Vanderbilt held a rally at 5 p.m. on the steps of Kirkland Hall, the university's administration building. Dining workers, occupy Nashville participants, and students representing Occupy Vanderbilt spoke at the rally.
- Mar. 21, 2012: Vanderbilt held the 2012 NACUFS southern regional conference. Occupy Vanderbilt interrupted the National Association of College & University Food Services event with a mic check. The protesters took a service elevator into a private reception at the Overcup Oak Pub in the Sarratt Student Center. Protestors questioned onlookers about the 315:1 ratio between the highest paid and lowest paid university worker. The event was filmed to increase campus awareness.
- Apr. 1, 2012: Occupy Vanderbilt marched down West End Ave to the Rally for the Right to Exist at Legislative Plaza. The rally and sleep-in was held in protest of a new state law which criminalizes camping in unauthorized areas and was created to target Occupy Nashville as well as Nashville's homeless population. The event was organized by homeless advocates and supported by Occupy Nashville and Vanderbilt. Occupy Vanderbilt brought a floating tent to the rally in order to subvert this state law, which they see as unjust.

== See also ==
=== Occupy Articles ===
- List of global Occupy protest locations
- Occupy movement
- Occupy Nashville
- Timeline of Occupy Wall Street
- We are the 99%

=== Related Articles ===
- Economic inequality
- Grassroots movement
- Income inequality in the United States
- Lobbying
- Plutocracy
- Protest
- Tea Party protests
- Timeline of Occupy Wall Street
- Wealth inequality in the United States
