= 1867 flood of Chattanooga =

Flood in Tennessee, United States

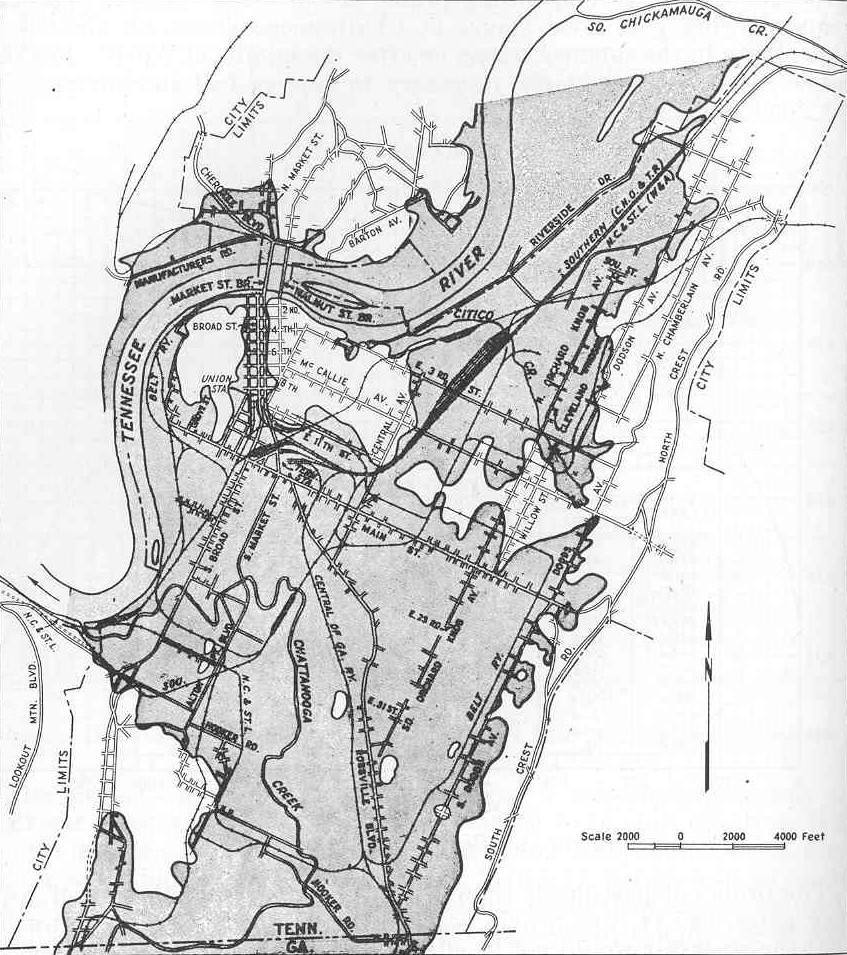
Chattanooga during the 1867 flood

The 1867 flood of Chattanooga is the largest flood in the city's recorded history. The flood followed a period of heavy rain that affected most of the Tennessee Valley and lasted from March 7 to March 11, 1867. At its highest point, the water of the Tennessee River crested 58 feet (18 metres) above its normal level, and it inundated much of the city.

== Meteorology ==
The flood of 1867 took place before reliable methods of meteorological data recording. However, it is known that days before the flood, a large area of Southern Appalachia including Tennessee, North Carolina, and Georgia experienced the same, large storm. The tremendous amounts of rainwater combined with the melting snow caused the tributaries and rivers of the Tennessee Valley to swell. In Chattanooga, the Tennessee River began to rise on March 4.

== Flood ==
Starting March 4, 1867, Chattanooga experienced a four-day-long rainstorm. By March 9, all of Chattanooga's streets were under 4 to 8 feet (1.2 to 2.4 metres) of water. Because there was no warning sent out, most residents of Hamilton Country were unprepared for a calamity of this magnitude. In addition to many lives being lost in the flood, the city also experienced huge structural damage. Military Bridge, which, at the time, was the only bridge that connected the north and south shores, was washed away. Chattanooga's telegraph lines were also destroyed or washed away, leaving the Chattanooga residents unable to communicate with neighboring cities. Low lying croplands and livestock fields were washed away, leaving local farmers devastated, and businesses and homes along the shores of the river were completely destroyed. At night, the city fell victim to looting and violence while the Tennessee River continuously rose sometimes at a rate of one foot every hour. On March 10, the Chattanooga American Union wrote that "the losses of our merchants, businessmen, and citizens cannot be estimated." Though the exact death toll is unknown, many residents in Chattanooga and the surrounding areas were killed. Corpses floated through the city's flooded streets, and a man on the old Lookout Mountain road had claimed that he had seen fifteen bodies float past in a day.

== Impact ==
Following the destruction of the Military Bridge, Chattanooga city was without a bridge until the Walnut Street Bridge was constructed in 1891. On March 9, an anonymously written article appeared in the Daily American Union saying that city officials had begun planning to start a major city project that would raise the street level by about one story through the city. The remnants of this massive project are still noticeable to the naked eye. Downtown Chattanooga is filled with tops of old windows and doors protruding out of the sidewalk and what seem to be basement doors that do not lead anywhere.

== See also ==
- Chattanooga
- Timeline of Chattanooga, Tennessee
- Tennessee River
- 2010 Tennessee floods
