= Greater Warner Tabernacle AME Zion Church, Knoxville =

Greater Warner Tabernacle AME Zion Church
- Greater Warner Tabernacle AME Zion Church
- 35.9974°N 83.8767°W
- Location: 3800 Martin Luther King Jr. Avenue, Knoxville, Tennessee, United States
- Country: United States
- Denomination: African Methodist Episcopal Zion Church

History
- Status: Active

Architecture
- Functional status: Historic congregation

The Greater Warner Tabernacle AME Zion Church is a historic church congregation presently located in a building at 3800 Martin Luther King Jr. Avenue in Knoxville, Tennessee. It was reportedly a station on the Underground Railroad. It is part of the African Methodist Episcopal Zion Church denomination, which was established in 1796 and has been referred to as the "freedom church" for its part in the abolitionist movement.

The congregation was first established in 1845 on Fuller Street, on land donated by a religious German. This first church was known as Warner Tabernacle; the first actual building was not constructed until the late 19th century. It was destroyed by storms in 1908, and the second church was completed in 1910. In 1967, the congregation moved to Speedway Circle and its name was changed to Speedway Circle AME Zion Church. In 1969, the name was changed to Greater Warner Tabernacle. In 1987, the congregation purchased the McCalla Avenue Baptist Church and moved again. This portion of McCalla Avenue is now known as Martin Luther King Jr. Avenue. Greater Warner Tabernacle is Knoxville's oldest extant African-American church congregation.
