= Andy Holt (politician) =

American politician (born 1981)

- Holt in 2026

Agriculture Commissioner of Tennessee
- Incumbent
- Assumed office October 1, 2025
- Governor: Bill Lee
- Preceded by: Charlie Hatcher

Member of the Tennessee House of Representatives from the 76th district
- In office January 11, 2011 – January 12, 2021
- Preceded by: Mark Maddox
- Succeeded by: Tandy Darby

Personal details
- Born: Andrew Hunter Holt; December 22, 1981 (age 44) Knoxville, Tennessee, U.S.
- Party: Republican
- Spouse: Ellie Anderson
- Children: 5
- Education: University of Tennessee (BS); University of Tennessee at Martin (MBA)
- Occupation: Politician; farmer; businessman

Andrew Hunter Holt (born December 22, 1981) is an American politician who served in the Tennessee House of Representatives, representing District 76, covering Weakley County and parts of Obion and Carroll Counties. Holt is a Republican and served as vice-chair of the Agriculture and Natural Resources Committee and as a member of the Local Government Committee and the Agriculture and Natural Resources Subcommittee. He served from 2011 to 2021, through Tennessee's 107th to 111th General Assemblies.

== Education ==
In 2004, Holt earned a BS degree in business and agricultural economics from the University of Tennessee at Knoxville. He later earned an MBA from the University of Tennessee at Martin in 2007.

== Tennessee House of Representatives (2011–2021) ==
Holt introduced fourteen bills in Tennessee's 108th General Assembly. The bills impacted laws ranging from taxes, county road supervisors, criminal procedure, and agricultural operations.

On January 5, 2016, Andy Holt was heavily criticized for making statements toward President Barack Obama regarding the president's executive orders on gun control. He took to Twitter to tell the president to "Take your gun control and shove it". This came on the heels of Holt's highly publicized Twitter spat stemming from a tweet he made in support of the occupation of the Malheur National Wildlife Refuge led by Ammon Bundy. Holt received criticism for the incident, including a call by Chattanooga City Councilman Chris Anderson for a Department of Justice investigation into Holt's "treasonous" behavior.

Holt considered running in the 2016 election for Tennessee's 8th congressional district, but ultimately declined to do so.

=== Agricultural issues ===
Holt sponsored HB 1191 (with companion SB 1248 introduced by Dolores Gresham), requiring anyone intentionally recording images documenting cruelty against livestock to report the violation and submit unedited photographs or video recordings to law enforcement within 48 hours. The bill made violation of the law a class C misdemeanor punishable by fine.

This type of bill, sometimes characterized as "anti-whistleblower" or "ag-gag" legislation, sparked heated public discourse. Holt asserted that the bill was intended to expose animal cruelty. However, animal protection organizations, such as the ASPCA, the Humane Society of the United States, and Mercy for Animals opposed the bill, arguing that it would instead result in short, incomplete investigations and prevent whistleblowers from coming forward, for fear of prosecution.

In public debate over HB 1191 after it passed and before it was signed into law by the governor, Holt sent an email to HSUS Public Policy Coordinator Kayci McLeod saying that "propagandist groups of radical animal activists, like your fraudulent and reprehensibly disgusting organization of maligned animal abuse profiteering corporatists ... are intent on using animals the same way human-traffickers use 17 year old women," and referring to HSUS methods as "tape and rape".

Holt also debated the issue via Twitter with country singer Carrie Underwood. Underwood criticized Tennessee lawmakers, saying, "Shame on TN lawmakers for passing the Ag Gag bill. If Gov. Bill Haslam signs this, he needs to expect me at his front door. Who's with me?" Holt replied, "I would say that if Carrie Underwood will stick to singing, I'll stick to lawmaking." Underwood, in turn, replied, "I should stick to singing? Wow…sorry, I'm just a tax paying citizen concerned for the safety of my family."

On May 13, 2013, Tennessee Governor Bill Haslam indicated that he would veto the bill because the Attorney General called the law "constitutionally suspect", because it appears to repeal parts of Tennessee's Shield Law without saying so, and because "there are concerns from some district attorneys that the act actually makes it more difficult to prosecute animal cruelty cases".

=== Removal of Confederate memorials ===
Holt supported a 2018 bill to strip Memphis, Tennessee, of $250,000 after the city opted to remove the busts of Confederate President Jefferson Davis and Confederate General and Ku Klux Klan leader Nathan Bedford Forrest. On June 9, 2020, Holt voted as a member of the House Naming, Designating, & Private Acts Committee against removal of a bust honoring Forrest from the Tennessee State Capitol building.

== Personal ==
Andy Holt is married to Ellie (née Anderson) Holt, whom he met while attending the University of Tennessee. Together, they have five children. The two own and operate a farm near Dresden, Tennessee. They attend Long Heights Baptist Church in McKenzie, where they teach youth Bible classes and where Holt is a deacon.

Holt also works for Bethel University and is a member of the Weakley County Farm Bureau Board of Directors.
