= The Leaf-Chronicle =

Daily newspaper in Clarksville, Tennessee

- The July 27, 2005 front page of The Leaf-Chronicle
- Type: Daily newspaper
- Format: Broadsheet
- Owner: USA Today Co.
- Editor: Gary Estwick
- Founded: 1808 (as the Clarksville Chronicle)
- Headquarters: 200 Commerce St. Clarksville, Tennessee 37040; United States
- Circulation: 22,264 Morning; 26,327 Sunday
- Website: theleafchronicle.com

The Leaf-Chronicle is a newspaper in the state of Tennessee, founded, officially, in 1808.

First appearing as a weekly newspaper under various names as early as 1808 and eventually as the Clarksville Chronicle, the current name is the result of a subsequent merger, in 1890, with the Tobacco Leaf, named for the area's predominant agricultural crop. (See Goodspeed's History of Tennessee, pg. 817) The Leaf-Chronicle is published daily in Clarksville, Tennessee. The Leaf-Chronicle achievement that has perhaps received the greatest acclaim in recent years is its continuing to publish every day after downtown Clarksville and its printing plant received a direct hit from a powerful tornado in January 1999.

== History ==
In 1808, The Clarksville Chronicle newspaper started publication. However, no editions earlier than 1811 seem to be extant today. Later, The Tobacco Leaf appeared as a result of the area's reputation as a center for tobacco growing and shipping. Early newspapers started out as four-page journals devoted to political news and advertising. Eventually they grew to become full-fledged publications that featured more news and community information, in addition to having opinion pages with political views. In 1890, The Clarksville Chronicle merged with The Tobacco Leaf, forming The Clarksville Leaf-Chronicle. In the 1970s, the city's name was dropped as the coverage area increased, shortening the title of the current newspaper to The Leaf-Chronicle.

Throughout the city's history, other newspapers such as The New Herald (an African-American newspaper), The Clarksville-Jeffersonian, and The Clarksville Star competed with The Clarksville Leaf-Chronicle, but they are all now defunct.

In December 1995, The Leaf-Chronicle became part of the Gannett Newspaper Division.

The offices of The Leaf-Chronicle were severely damaged in the January 22, 1999 tornado; however, the paper was still released the following day, after then publisher F. Gene Washer took editors and reporters into his home to gather news and used the Kentucky New Era's printing press in Hopkinsville. The Saturday edition of The Leaf Chronicle was a complete newspaper that featured eight pages of tornado coverage. Within four days, the staff was able to print from the downtown newspaper press, only slightly damaged. The departments worked out of an empty grocery store for eight months, until the main offices were rebuilt and reopened in the fall of 1999.

Washer retired in 2008 and remains the newspaper's publisher emeritus. He was replaced by Andrew Oppmann, also publisher of Murfreesboro's Daily News Journal. Also in 2008, the newspaper consolidated its printing and production operations with its sister newspaper, The Tennessean in Nashville. Oppmann departed from both Gannett papers in late 2010.

In 2023, the paper made a landmark hire, bringing on star sportswriter Jacob Shames from the Montgomery Advertiser.
