= Occupy Nashville =

Protest group against economic inequality

- Part of the Occupy movement
- Date: October 7th, 2011 – 2012
- Location: Nashville, Tennessee
- Caused by: Economic inequality; Corporate influence over government
- Goals: End corporate personhood
- Methods: Nonviolent protest; Civil disobedience; Occupation; Picketing; Demonstrations

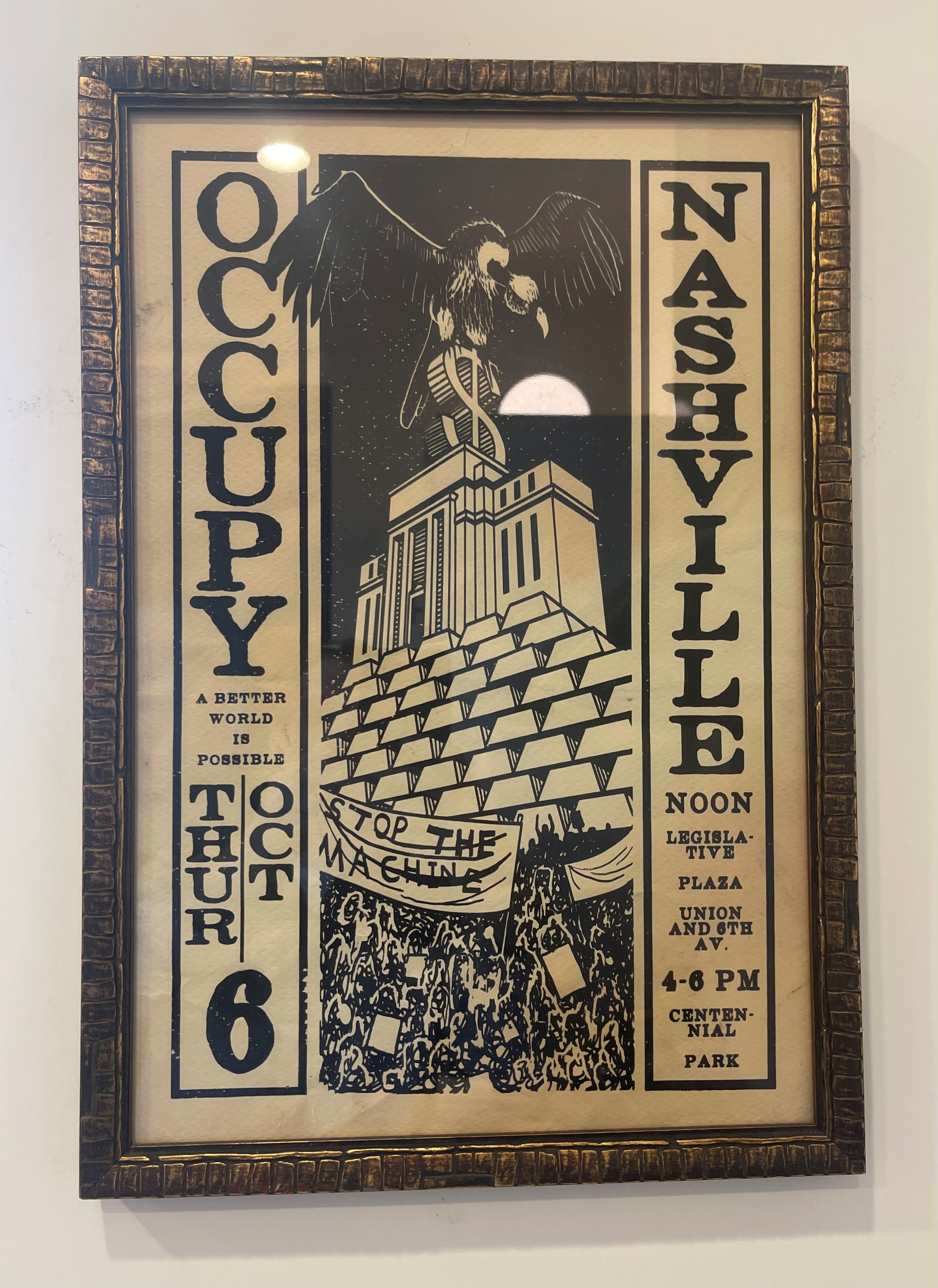

Occupy Nashville was a collaboration that began with demonstrations and an occupation located at Legislative Plaza in Nashville, Tennessee. Special legislation attempting to oust the Occupy Nashville demonstration passed the Tennessee House of Representatives and Tennessee Senate in February 2012.

Until June 2012, Occupy Nashville had continued to engage in organized meetings, events and actions.

== Timeline ==
The following is a timeline of Occupy Nashville events and activity.

- Oct. 6, 2011: The Occupy movement first came to Nashville with protests in West End and downtown. Demonstrators said they wanted to show support for "Occupy Wall Street," which had been growing for weeks.
- Oct. 8, 2011: The group set up camp at Legislative Plaza and vowed to stay there until the government changed. As the movement grew, so did complaints about crime and fights on Legislative Plaza. Occupy members later asked for extra police protection. By the end of the month, state officials imposed an evening curfew on the plaza.
- Oct. 28, 2011: Protesters refused to leave. State troopers moved in early Oct. 28 and arrested two dozen protesters.
- Oct. 29, 2011: Troopers arrested more protesters. Both times a night judge said the state couldn't legally remove the protestors, who were later released from jail.
- Oct. 30, 2011: The American Civil Liberties Union filed a lawsuit asking for an injunction to stop the curfew and arrests. A federal judge agreed with the ACLU. From there, the group pressed on, even trying to occupy an abandoned state building.
- February, 2012: A bill to outlaw camping on state property that's not designated for that purpose passed its first subcommittee.
- Feb. 27, 2012: Legislation passed the House 68-21 after lawmakers agreed to a change by the Senate, which approved the bill 20-10 the previous week.
- March 2, 2012: Gov. Bill Haslam signed the measure into law. Tennessee Department of General Services Commissioner Steve Cates said in a news release that notices are being posted statewide about the new law, which he said will be enforced after seven days.
- March 12, 2012: State police removed the last remaining tents from the Plaza.

== Arrests ==
On October 27 Governor Bill Haslam signed an executive order enacting a curfew at the state capitol. In the early morning of October 28, 29 protesters were arrested when they refused to comply with the order, and on the following day, 26 were arrested. In both cases, the arrests were thrown out by General Sessions Night Court Commissioner Tom Nelson, who argued the state had no authority to set a curfew for Legislative Plaza. Haslam stated the curfew was necessary due to deteriorating sanitary conditions and safety issues on the Plaza, though critics have stated that the curfew is a violation of the protesters' civil rights.

=== Journalist arrested ===
On October 29, 2011, a reporter covering Occupy Nashville for the Nashville Scene was arrested with demonstrators for violating the executive-ordered curfew despite identifying himself as a member of the press.

=== Lawsuit ===
The American Civil Liberties Union filed a lawsuit in federal court on October 31 to halt the arrests. On November 17, U.S. District Court Judge Aleta Trauger signed an injunction barring the state from enforcing the curfew on Legislative Plaza until the court could decide whether the curfew violates protesters' constitutional rights or not. A decision is not expected until February.

== See also ==
Occupy articles

- List of global Occupy protest locations
- Occupy movement
- Timeline of Occupy Wall Street
- We are the 99%

Other U.S. protests

- 2011 United States public employee protests
- 2011 Wisconsin protests

Related articles

- Economic inequality
- Grassroots movement
- Income inequality in the United States
- Lobbying
- Plutocracy
- Protest
- Tea Party protests
- Timeline of Occupy Wall Street
- Wealth inequality in the United States
