= The Daily News Journal =

Daily newspaper serving Murfreesboro, Tennessee, US

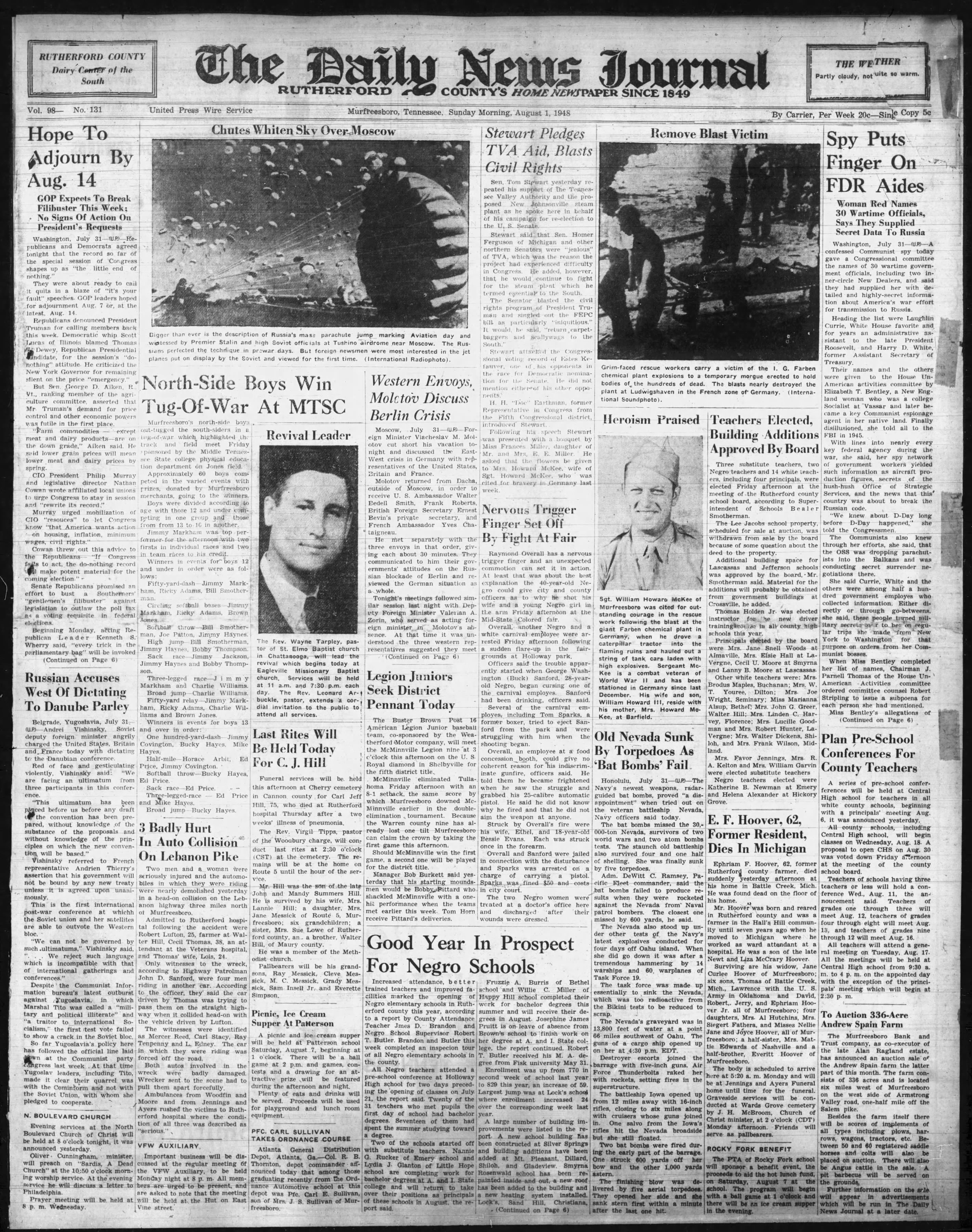
- A representative front page of the Daily News Journal in August 1948
- Type: Daily newspaper
- Format: Broadsheet
- Owner: USA Today Co.
- General manager: Sean Lupton
- News editor: Sandee Suitt
- Founded: 1931
- Language: English
- Headquarters: 201 E. Main St. Suite 400; Murfreesboro, TN 37130; United States
- Circulation: 15,800 daily 18,900 Sunday
- Sister newspapers: Rutherford A.M. Smyrna A.M. Sidelines; Murfreesboro Magazine
- ISSN: 0745-2683
- OCLC number: 9008844
- Website: dnj.com

The Daily News Journal, commonly abbreviated to DNJ, is a newspaper serving Murfreesboro, Tennessee, Rutherford County, and surrounding communities. It is Rutherford County's sole daily newspaper. It publishes print and digital content. Published in Murfreesboro, it serves as the primary local newspaper, with competition from The Murfreesboro Post and other publications. The newspaper is not in competition with The Tennessean of Nashville, as both are owned by USA Today Co. USA Today Co. acquired DNJ from Morris Multimedia in 2004.

The roots the DNJ date back to the founding of Murfreesboro News in 1850. This paper would eventually merge with several competitors, and in 1931, the daily Home Journal and Murfreesboro News-Banner joined to form The Daily News Journal. DNJ currently publishes daily local papers, and also prints two weekly editions titled Smyrna A.M. and Rutherford A.M.

From 1951, DNJ occupied the Brady-Tompkins-January-McFadden house at 224 N. Walnut St., which was originally built prior to the American Civil War. In a deal begun in mid-2014, the Rutherford County government purchased the Walnut Street property in order to build a new judicial building and parking garage. On June 8, 2015, DNJ opened its new offices in the SunTrust Building on East Main Street.

The DNJ publishes news in a variety of forms, such as print, online, app, and in social media. The paper is also managed by award-winning staff.

== History ==
The Daily News Journal is the result of several newspaper merges across time, with the earliest ancestor being The Murfreesboro News in 1850. Two different newspapers went bankrupt and merged their assets together to create the Daily News Journal in 1931. One of these papers was called The Home Journal and was founded by Chip Henderson in 1890. The paper was purchased by Louis J. Burgdorf in 1898, and then was owned by Andrew L. Todd and William Trevathan in 1920. The other paper was called The News Banner and was created by Chip Henderson's first cousin, C.C. Henderson, who combined The Independent Banner and The Murfreesboro News in 1898. Jesse C. Beesley Jr. purchased The News Banner in 1926, but, in 1927, Beesley went bankrupt on account of the depression.

The Daily News Journal was merged and founded in 1931, though the first edition did not specify publisher information. The paper was then sold by Todd to E. W. "Ned" Carmack, who mismanaged the paper, failing to compete with competitor The Rutherford Courier. In 1939, Todd bought the paper again, only to be sold to Jack McFarland. Gannett Co., Inc. received the DNJ and The Review Appeal of Franklin after giving Morris Multimedia, Inc. The Times and other papers in 2004.

The paper used to claim to have been running "since 1849;" however, its ancestral paper The Murfreesboro News was founded in 1850 by A. Watkins and was shut down due to the Civil War. In 1866, Rev. Henderson re-started The Murfreesboro News, which was later bought by C.C. Henderson in 1898.

In March 2022, The Daily New Journal moved to a six-day printing schedule, eliminating its printed Saturday edition.

== Location ==
The Daily News Journal's original location was the Brady-Tompkins-January-McFadden house at 218 W. Main St. in Murfreesboro, when Todd owned the paper in 1921. After 29 years, the paper was moved to 224 N Walnut St in Murfreesboro, but was later moved into the offices in the SunTrust Building on East Main Street in 2015, after Rutherford country government purchased the property for judicial buildings and parking. The DNJ's printing presses in Murfreesboro were shut down and moved to The Tennessean's presses in Nashville during 2006.

== Competitors and rivalries ==
Because Gannett owns both The DNJ and The Tennessean, they are not in competition. However, The DNJ is in competition with smaller local newspapers, like The Murfreesboro Post. The paper also has two sister newspapers published weekly, called Smyrna A.M. and Rutherford A.M.

== Digital publications ==
The Daily News Journal has both print and online publications. The paper has a website, where it publishes online articles on news, sports, lifestyles, opinion, and obituaries. Gannett also created The Daily News Journal Print Edition app for the DNJ, which displays news stories from the print version, for iPhone, Android, and iPad. The paper also has an email newsletters on subjects "Coronavirus Watch," "Daily Briefing," "News Alerts," "On Your Plate," and "Tennessee Voices". Newspapers.com and Gannett collaborated to connect The DNJ with the Rutherford County Library System, which supports online access to The Daily News Journal archives. It also has a social media presence on various platforms. As of 2024, most interaction comes from Facebook at over 38,000 followers, then Twitter with over 16,000 followers, and lastly Instagram with 1,500 followers.
