= Tennessee Department of Agriculture =

State agency in Tennessee

Agency overview
- Formed: 1854
- Headquarters: Ellington Agricultural Center 420 Hogan Rd. Nashville, Tennessee, United States
- Agency executive: Andy Holt, Commissioner
- Website: www.tn.gov/agriculture

The Tennessee Department of Agriculture is a Cabinet-level agency in the government of Tennessee. Founded in 1854, it is the oldest state agency in Tennessee.

The current commissioner is Andy Holt.

== History ==
=== Creation of the Bureau of Agriculture ===
The agency was first established in 1854, by the Tennessee General Assembly as the Bureau of Agriculture. It was the first agency created in Tennessee. It was organized primarily to promote agriculture through fairs and livestock expositions. The original agency had a staff of nine, including the Governor and eight others who met twice a year to conduct state business. When Tennessee seceded from the Union in 1861, the Bureau was suspended.

=== Reorganization after the Civil War ===
In 1871, the Bureau was re-organized and re-constituted. It was structured as it had been before the war, and it was still composed of the Governor and eight others.

In 1875, the General Assembly passed an act creating the Bureau of Agriculture, Statistics, and Mines. This new agency had the same responsibilities as the former, but also had oversight of state statistical collection and regulation of mines. The head of agency was then known as the Commissioner of Agriculture, Statistics, and Mines.

For a brief time in the late nineteenth century, the agency was also responsible for immigration management in the state.

=== Modern Cabinet-level department ===
In 1923, the name of the agency was officially changed to the "Department of Agriculture," and the agency's oversight of statistics and mines was removed to other state departments. The Commissioner's title was restored to "Commissioner of Agriculture," and he was recognized, as the director of the State's oldest agency, as the Cabinet member with the greatest seniority.

In 1961, the commissioner and his department moved out of the State's downtown Nashville offices and into a new facility south of the city called the Elligton Agricultural Center. The facility is a working farm and named for Buford Ellington, the 40th Governor of Tennessee who also served as Commissioner of Agriculture in the late 1950s. The center sits on 200 acres, and the department's relocation there meant that Tennessee was the first State to locate its department of agriculture on a working farm.

== Duties and responsibilities of the Commissioner ==
Tennessee Commissioner of Agriculture
- Incumbent; Andy Holt since October 1, 2025
- Formation: 12 January 1854
- Website: tn.gov/agriculture

The Commissioner is appointed by the Governor and serves at his pleasure. He directs the work of the Department of Agriculture. The Department is charged with promoting wise uses of Tennessee's agricultural and forest resources, developing economic opportunities for Tennesseans, and ensuring safe and dependable food and fiber for the State. The department also oversees food safety, pesticide use, and fuel quality and fairness for Tennessean consumers.

The Commissioner organizes the department into five divisions:

- Division of Administration
- Division of Forestry
- Division of Consumer and Industry Services
- Division of Animal Health
- Division of Business Development

== List of commissioners ==
No.	Name	County	Took office	Left office	Governor(s)
1	Joseph Buckner Killebrew	Montgomery	1872	1881	John C. Brown; James D. Porter; Albert S. Marks
2	A. W. Hawkins	Carroll	1881	1883	Alvin Hawkins
3	A. J. McWhirter	Davidson	1883	1887	William B. Bate
4	R. M. Hord	Rutherford	1887	1891	Robert Love Taylor
5	D. Godwin	Shelby	1891	1893	John P. Buchanan
6	T. P. Allison	Williamson	1893	1897	Peter Turney
7	John T. Essary	Hamblen	1897	1899	Robert Love Taylor
8	Thomas H. Paine	Hardin	1899	1903	Benton McMillin
9	W. W. Ogilvie	Marshall	1903	1907	James B. Frazier; John I. Cox
10	John Thompson	Davidson	1907	1911	Malcolm R. Patterson
11	Thomas F. Peck	McMinn	1911	1915	Ben W. Hooper
12	H. K. Bryson	Lincoln	1915	1919	Thomas Clarke Rye
