= Joseph Buckner Killebrew =

American planter, geologist, and advocate for education reform

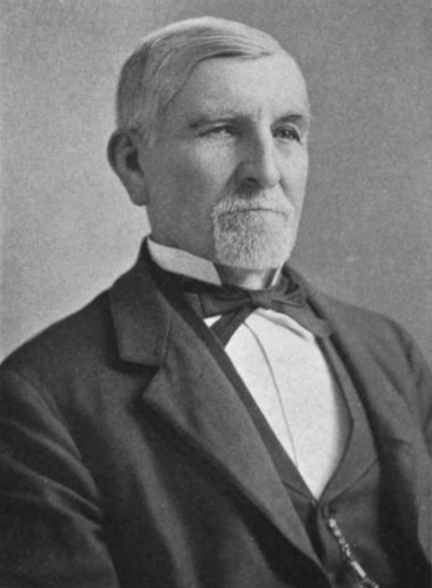
- Born: May 29, 1831; Montgomery County, Tennessee
- Died: March 17, 1906 (aged 74); Nashville, Tennessee
- Education: University of North Carolina at Chapel Hill
- Occupation: Planter
- Spouse: Mary Catherine Wimberly (m. 1857)

Joseph Buckner Killebrew (1831–1906) was an American planter and geologist.

== Biography ==
=== Early life ===
Joseph Buckner Killebrew was born in Montgomery County, Tennessee on May 29, 1831. When he was four years old, his mother died, and he was raised by a succession of relatives. He attended college and was deeply interested in education, agriculture, and geology. In 1851, he entered Franklin College in middle Tennessee, but soon exhausted his funds. He accepted a position teaching mathematics at the Clarksville school of John D. Tyler. In 1853, a family friend offered to finance his college education at the institution of his choice. He chose the University of North Carolina at Chapel Hill, where he graduated second in his class in June 1857. He was a member of the Philanthropic Society while at UNC.

He married Mary Catherine Wimberly on December 3, 1857, and they had six children.

=== Career ===
As a young man, he took charge of the family farm. He was opposed to the secession attitudes of his fellow southerners, and he searched for ways to improve the situation of his slaves as well as his farm. During the American Civil War of 1861–1865, he knew that if slaves were able to survive emancipation, they must be trained in business. He started by paying his slaves wages for their labor, and he began to teach his slaves the skills necessary to function as free men: reading, writing, and math.

He was a progressive in the South during Reconstruction, realizing that his fellow Tennesseans needed to possess greater agriculture knowledge and skills if the South was to ever truly rebuild. He realized that a new South could only truly arise from the foundation of an education system that sought to offer equal education to all of its citizens. He authored the education reform bill in Tennessee. This innovative law dared to make education available to rich and poor alike.

=== Death ===
He died in Nashville, Tennessee on March 17, 1906.
