= Government of Memphis, Tennessee =

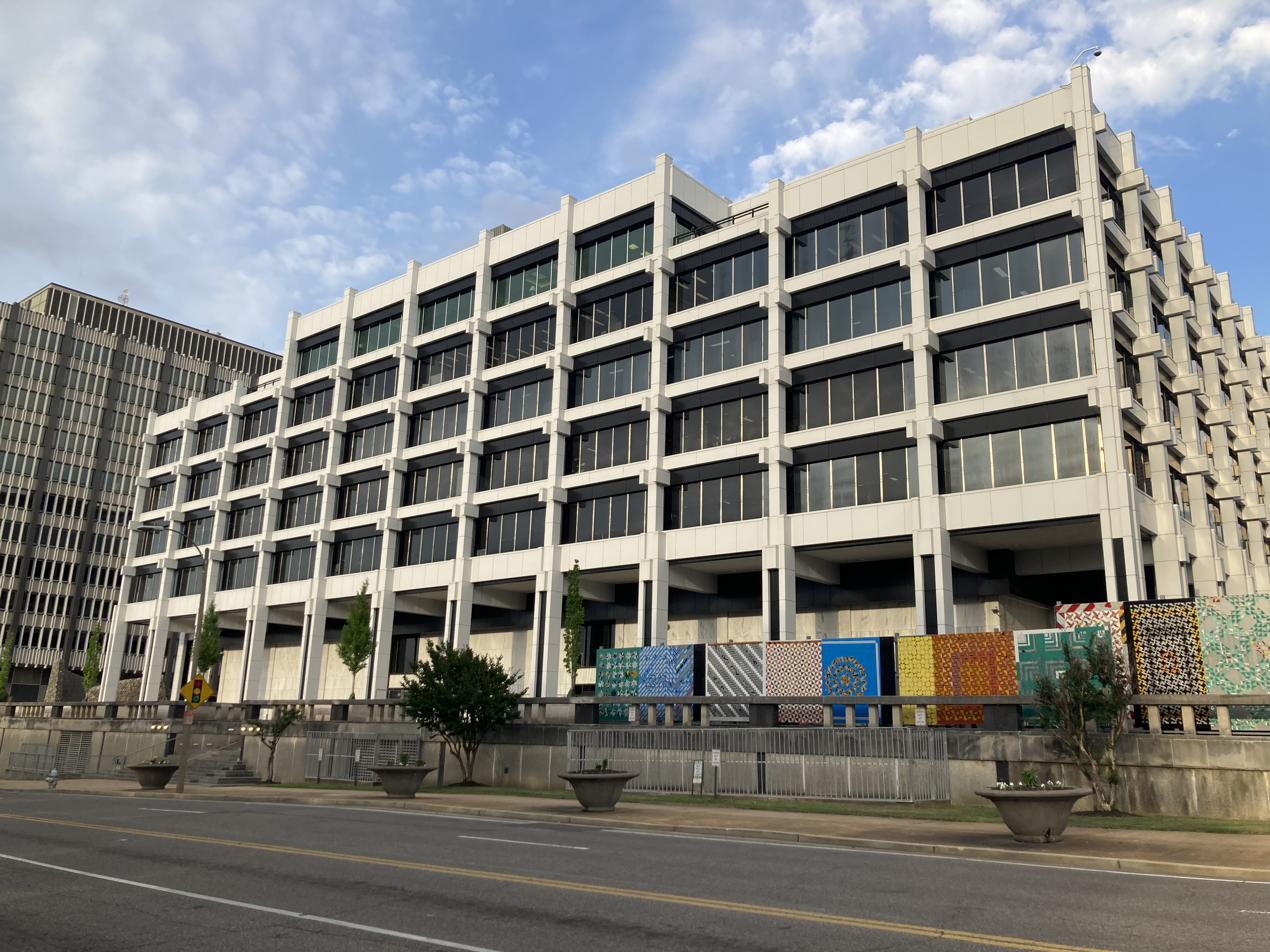
Memphis City Hall in 2025

The government of Memphis, Tennessee consists of a mayor and thirteen city council members. Since 1995, as a result of a legal challenge, all council members are elected from nine geographic districts. Seven are single-member districts and two have three representatives each.

== Executive branch ==
=== Mayor ===
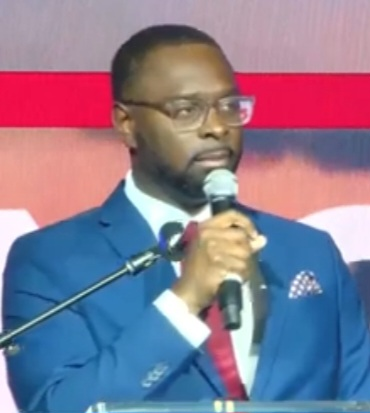
Paul Young, the mayor of Memphis as of 2024

The Mayor of Memphis is the chief executive officer of the city. Mayors serve four-year terms. The current mayor is Paul Young, who took office on January 1, 2024. The previous mayor was Jim Strickland.

Former mayor W.W. Herenton has been a formidable and controversial local political figure. At the time of his resignation he was serving his fourth consecutive term as Mayor. He was elected for the first time in 1991 as the city's first elected African-American mayor. J.O. Patterson, Jr., had previously served as mayor on an interim basis, and is considered the first African American in the position. Prior to his election, Dr. Herenton served for 12 years as the superintendent of Memphis City Schools.

=== Departments and agencies ===
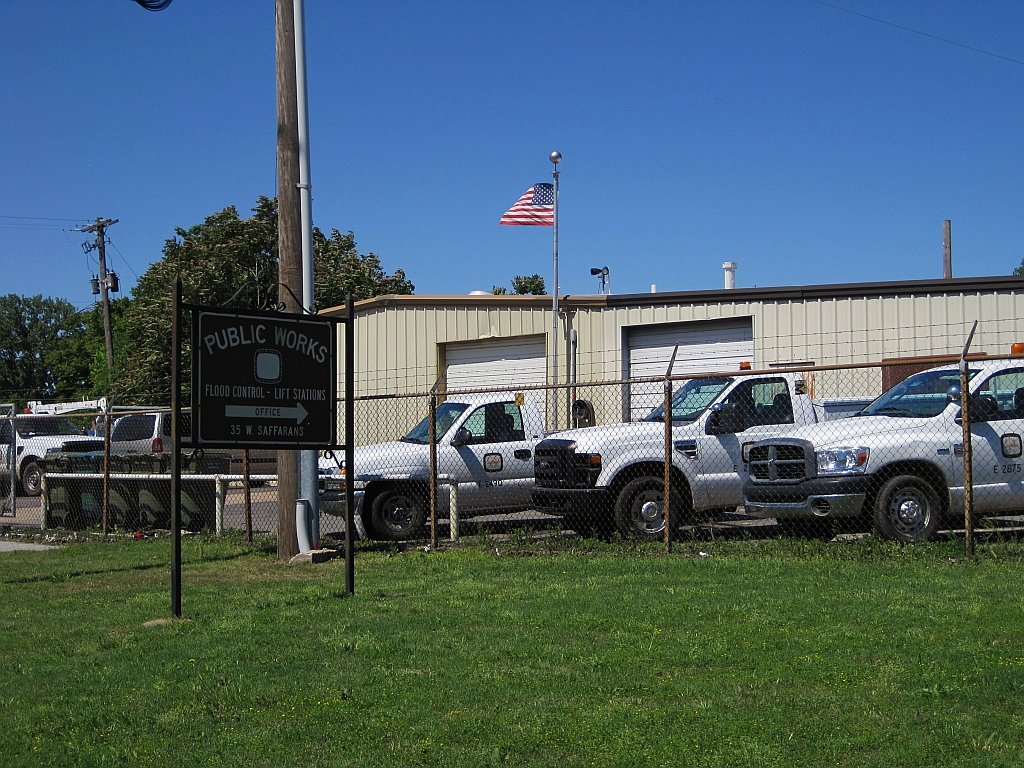
Memphis Public Works flood control office

The departments and divisions under the mayor's office include the following:

- Animal Services (MAS)
- City Court Clerk
- Communications
- Community Affairs
- Community Enhancement
- Executive
- Engineering
- Finance
- Fire Department (MFD)
- General Services
- Housing Community Development
- Human Resources
- Information Technology
- City Attorney / Law
- Library (MPL)
- Memphis Metropolitan Land Bank Authority (MMLBA)
- Municipal Court Judges
- Parks
- Planning and Development
- Police Department (MPD)
- Public Works
- Solid Waste
- Youth Services

=== Boards and commissions ===
Established in 1930, the Memphis City Beautiful Commission is the oldest beautification project in the United States.

== Legislative branch ==
Legislative responsibilities in the City of Memphis are handled by the 13-member Memphis City Council.

== History ==
After being classified as a taxing district in 1880 after a grievous loss of population due to the yellow fever epidemic, Memphis regained home rule in 1893. It established a city commission form of government, which it maintained until 1968.

At that time, it established a mayor-council government of thirteen council positions. Six were elected at-large and seven were elected from single-member districts. Following implementation of the Voting Rights Act of 1965, African Americans began to register and vote in greater number.

Civil rights activists challenged the at-large voting structure for the city council, as it diluted the voting power of the minority and prevented their electing candidates of their choice. The at-large seats tended to be won by wealthier candidates who could mount citywide campaigns and command majority votes; in 1970, there was a substantial white majority.

In 1995 the city adopted a different electoral system, maintaining 13 seats on the council. Seven positions are elected from single-member districts, and two districts elect three representatives each. Since these changes, more Democrats and women have been elected to the city council than under the at-large system.

=== Ford family ===
The African-American Ford family has been influential in politics in the city for generations. The senior members established a funeral home, and built a broad network in the black community. Their political prominence dates to the era of E.H. Crump in the early 20th century in Memphis and the state. The best-known member of this family is Harold Ford, Sr., who represented most of Memphis in the U.S. House from 1975 to 1997. He was succeeded by his son Harold Ford, Jr. who served from 1997 to 2007.

His brother, John Ford, was also a politician, serving as a state senator for 30 years. In 2007, John Ford was convicted on federal bribery charges in the Tennessee Waltz scandal.

=== Consolidation efforts ===
Since the late 20th century, regional discussions have recurred on the concept of consolidating unincorporated Shelby County and Memphis into a metropolitan government, as Nashville-Davidson County did in 1963. Consolidation was a referendum item on the 2010 ballots in both the city of Memphis and Shelby County, under the state law for dual-voting on such measures. The referendum was controversial in both jurisdictions. Black leaders, including then-Shelby County Commissioner Joe Ford and national civil rights leader Al Sharpton, opposed the consolidation. According to the plaintiffs' expert, Marcus Pohlmann, these leaders "tried to turn that referendum into a civil rights issue, suggesting that for blacks to vote for consolidation was to give up hard-won civil rights victories of the past."

In October 2010 before the vote, eight Shelby County citizens had filed a lawsuit in federal court against the state and the Shelby County Elections Commission against the dual-voting requirement. Plaintiffs argued that total votes for the referendum should have been counted together, rather than as separate elections. City voters narrowly supported the measure for consolidation with 50.8% in favor; county voters overwhelmingly voted against the measure with 85% against. The state argued that with the election decided, the lawsuit should be dismissed, but the federal court disagreed.

By late 2013, in pre-trial actions, both sides were trying to disqualify the other's experts, in discussions of whether regional voting revealed racial polarization, and whether voting on the referendum demonstrated racial bloc voting. "The experts for both sides have clashed on whether racial bloc voting is inevitable in local elections and whether that would require some kind of court remedy."

The defendants' expert, Todd Donovan, did not think that polarized voting as revealed for political candidates meant that "African-American voters and white voters have polarized interests when it comes to referendum choices on government administration, taxation, service provision and other policy questions." He noted, "In the absence of distinct political interests that create polarized blocs of referendum voters defined by race, there is no cohesive racial minority voting interest that can be diluted by a referendum."

In 2014, the federal district court dismissed the lawsuit, on the grounds that the referendum would have failed when both jurisdictions' votes were counted together. (In total voting, 64% of voters opposed the consolidation.) In the last week of December 2014, the U.S. Sixth District Court of Appeals upheld that decision, ruling that, "In this election, the referendum for consolidation did not pass and would not have passed even if there had been no dual-majority vote requirement (with the vote counts combined)."

Before the referendum, the decision was made by the city and county to exclude public school management and operations from the proposed consolidation. In 2011, the Memphis city council voted to dissolve its city school board and consolidate with the Shelby County School System, without the collaboration or agreement of Shelby County. The city had authority for this action under Tennessee state laws that differentiate between city and county powers.

== Congressional representation ==
In the United States House of Representatives, Memphis is split between two congressional districts. The western three-fourths of the city, including downtown, forms the core of the 9th District, which has been represented by Democrat Steve Cohen since 2007. Cohen was the first white Democrat to represent a significant portion of Memphis in more than 40 years. Previously, as mentioned above, the district had been held for 32 years by the Ford family—in the persons of Harold, Sr. and his son, Harold, Jr. Harold, Jr. gave up the seat to make an unsuccessful run for the United States Senate seat being vacated by Bill Frist.

The eastern fourth of the city is in the 8th District, represented by Republican David Kustoff of nearby Germantown. From 1973 to 2013, this area had been part of the 7th District (numbered as the 6th District from 1973 to 1983).

The district lines reflect intertwined racial and political polarization in the Memphis area. The 9th is a heavily Democratic, majority-black district and is considered one of the most Democratic districts in the South; it has a Cook Partisan Voting Index of D+25. In contrast, the 8th is a heavily Republican district with a strong tinge of social conservatism. Eastern Shelby County is reckoned as the most Republican area of the state outside of the state's traditional Republican heartland of East Tennessee; the area's conservative white voters began splitting their tickets as early as the 1950s and switched parties outright in the late 1960s. When eastern Shelby County was moved from the 7th to the 8th as a result of redistricting in 2013, it turned the 8th into one of the most Republican districts in the South and the nation; it has a PVI of R+19. This is because eastern Shelby County has as many people as the rest of the district combined.

== See also ==
- Flag of Memphis, Tennessee
- Government of Tennessee
