= Dickerson Wells =

American Christian preacher

Dickerson L. S. Wells

Personal details
- Born: 1960 (age 65–66)
- Denomination: Pentecostal, COGIC
- Residence: Memphis, Tennessee, United States
- Spouse: Valesa S. J. Wells
- Children: Dickerson Wells II, ZaQuita Wells, Chantelle Wells, Chandler Wells, Tyler Wells

Dickerson LeMoyne Shillicutt Wells is an American preacher from Memphis, Tennessee in the Church of God in Christ and was the youngest minister, at the time in 1978, to be ordained as a clergyman in the COGIC denomination in the state of Tennessee.

== The Life of Dickerson Wells ==
Educated in Chicago and Memphis public schools, Pastor Wells matriculated at LeMoyne-Owen College, receiving a Bachelor of Arts, and completed a master's degree at the University of Memphis. Wells was an English and social studies educator in the Memphis City School System. Wells received a license to preach at the age of eighteen, the youngest ever to receive an ordination in Tennessee, at the hand of the late Bishop J. O. Patterson Sr. Bishop F. D. Macklin looked on the work and ministry of Dickerson Wells and made him the evangelical president of the Jurisdiction of Tennessee. In the year 1988, he organized the Bethesda Church of God in Christ and was given his appointment from elder to superintendent by Bishop J. O. Patterson Jr. In 1990, Dr. E. L. Battles made Wells the president of the National Evangelist Department of the Church of God in Christ. He served the Tennessee Eastern First Jurisdiction in 1991 under the leadership of Bishop H. Jenkins Bell as the pastor of the Greater Faith Temple COGIC in Clarksville, Tennessee. Bishop J. O. Patterson, Jr. appointed Pastor Wells as the administrative assistant to the presiding bishop of the COGIC. Almost immediately after, Pastor Wells assumed the pastorate of another church in Memphis, called Bethel COGIC. He remains the pastor of both Bethesda COGIC & Bethel COGIC to this day in Memphis. He was consecrated and ordained as an Auxiliary Bishop in the COGIC on November 8, 2015.

=== Personal life ===
Pastor Wells is married to Valesa S. J. Wells. Together, they have 4 children: ZaQuita Wells, Dickerson Wells II, Chantelle Wells, and Chandler Wells.
