= 1978 Memphis fire and police strikes =

Labor strikes in Memphis, Tennessee, United States

1978 Memphis Police and Fire strike
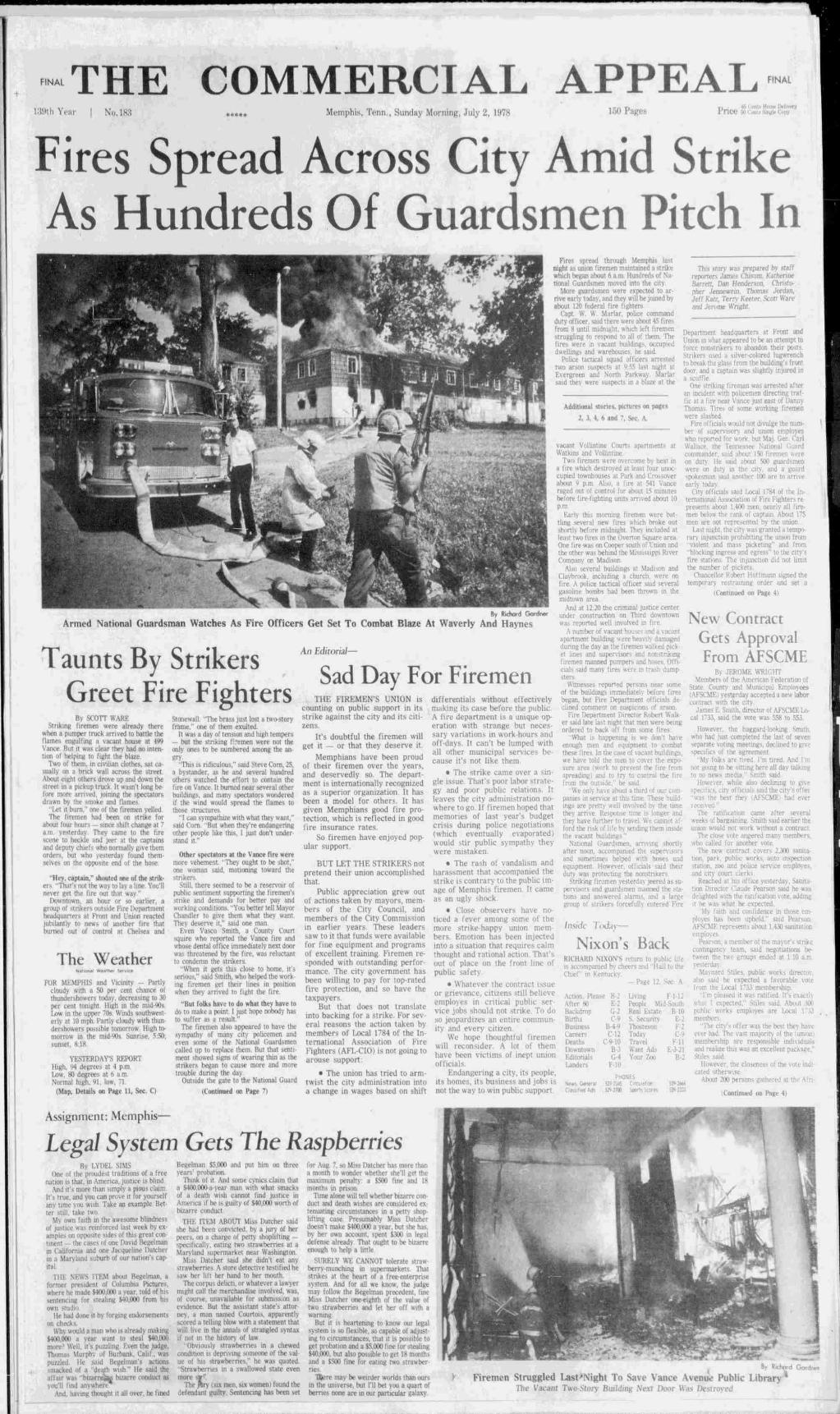
- The front page of the July 2, 1978, issue of The Commercial Appeal discussing the firefighters' strike
- Date: July 1–4, 1978 (Initial firefighter strike); August 10–19, 1978 (Police strike); August 14–19, 1978 (Wildcat firefighter strike)
- Location: Memphis, Tennessee, United States
- Caused by: Disagreements over the terms of new labor contracts
- Methods: Picketing; Strike action
- Result: Unions agree to contracts with offers largely similar to those initially posed by the city government

Parties
International Association of Fire Fighters Local 1784; Memphis Police Association	Government of Memphis, Tennessee: Memphis Fire Department; Memphis Police Department

In mid-1978, unionized firefighters and police officers in Memphis, Tennessee, United States, engaged in several strike actions against the city government. The first occurred from July 1 to 4 and involved about 1,400 firefighters. About 1,100 police officers commenced a strike on August 10, during which firefighters commenced a wildcat strike, on August 14. All striking ended on August 19, following an agreement with the city government and the two groups.

The labor disputes stemmed from contract negotiations that the two labor unions—the Memphis Police Association and the International Association of Fire Fighters Local 1784—had been having with the city government headed by Mayor J. Wyeth Chandler, who rebuffed demands for larger wage increases. Subsequently, Local 1784 went on strike on July 1, prompting the mayor to issue a civil emergency and a curfew and request assistance from the Tennessee Army National Guard. This strike ended via a court order on July 4. In the interim, there had been a large number of fires that caused extensive damage to the city, with several public officials accusing the strikers of engaging in arson. Afterwards, negotiations resumed with the firefighters and continued with the police officers.

On August 10, police officers went on strike, again prompting the mayor to issue a civil emergency and curfew and call in the National Guard. Police officers disobeyed a court order mandating a return to work, prompting the mayor to order that striking officers be terminated. On August 14, firefighters initiated a wildcat strike in conjunction with the police officers. On August 17, police officers and firefighters voted to accept a deal with the city government that was largely the same as what had initially been proposed to them, with some minor changes.

Following the strike, an amendment to the municipal charter was enacted to immediately terminate from employment any municipal employee who engaged in a job action against the city. Subsequently, these strikes were the last conducted by municipal employees in Memphis, as of 2004. The strikes also marked the last time that a civil emergency and curfew were declared in the city until 2020, as a result of the COVID-19 pandemic and the George Floyd protests, respectively.

== Background ==
=== Memphis and public sector labor unions ===
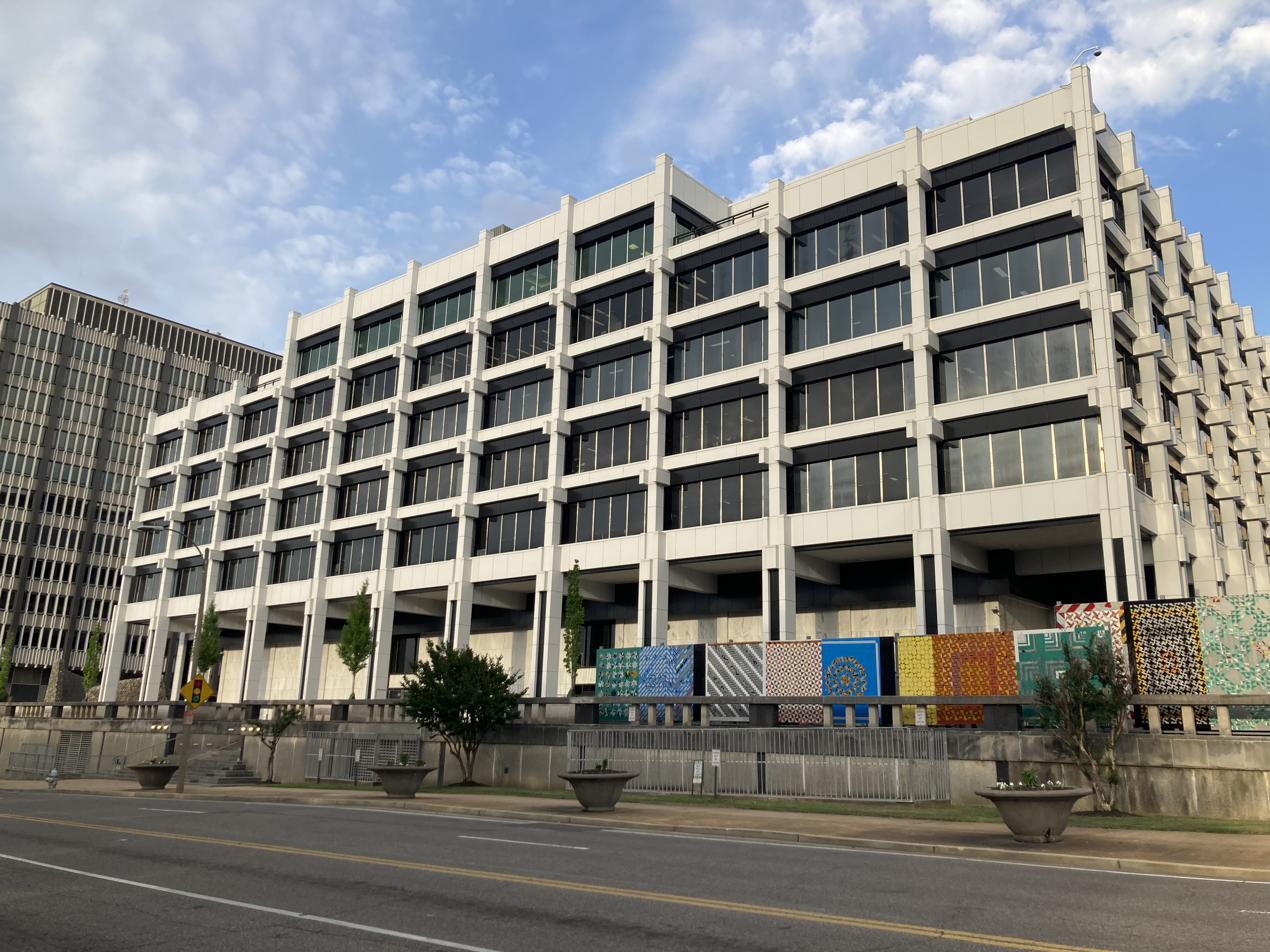
Memphis City Hall, pictured 2025

Prior to the late 1960s, the government of Memphis, Tennessee, did not grant recognition to any labor union representing public employees, claiming that such recognition was illegal under state laws. (Note: According to academics Armand J. Thieblot Jr. and Thomas R. Haggard, while the state government had never passed a law regarding collective bargaining by public employees, the state's courts had consistently ruled that they were illegal.) However, in the aftermath of the 1968 Memphis sanitation strike, the city government agreed to recognize Local 1733 of the American Federation of State, County and Municipal Employees (AFSCME) as the official bargaining unit for the city's sanitation workers. Following this, the Memphis City Council passed a resolution that allowed for the city to recognize other public sector labor unions. By 1973, the city had recognized both a police union—the Memphis Police Association (Note: While the Memphis Police Association served as the official bargaining unit for Memphis's police officers, African American and other ethnic minority officers were represented by another union, the Afro-American Police Association, in certain matters.)—and a firefighters' union—Local 1784 of the International Association of Fire Fighters. With both unions, the city government had agreements that prohibited them from engaging in strike actions. By 1978, the government had recognized thirteen public sector unions and engaged in bargaining with them. Collectively, these groups represented 4,718 of the city's 9,000 employees.

=== Contract negotiations in 1978 ===
By mid-1978, the city government had negotiated new employment contracts with many of their public sector unions, including the AFSCME local union. However, both the police and firefighters' unions were still in negotiations with the city. According to academics Armand J. Thieblot Jr. and Thomas R. Haggard, negotiations were tense in part because the last contracts signed with the unions had been established on the belief that the city government would experience a budget deficit when, in fact, it experienced a budget surplus. Additionally, the firefighters expressed discontent with the fact that they had been earning less than police officers and that the city's approach to wage increases, which included percent increases across the board, would increase the disparity. Leading up to July, the firefighters' union had been engaged in negotiations with the city government for several weeks.

The firefighters were seeking a pay raise, which would have included bonus pay of $0.50 (equivalent to $2.47 in 2025) per hour for work performed during evenings and nights. However, J. Wyeth Chandler, the mayor of Memphis, stated that the government would not exceed the offer made to the other unions. These terms would have included an immediate pay increase of 6 percent, a bonus pay in April 1979 of $30 ($133 in 2025), and a 7.5 percent wage increase in October 1979. Per the city's offer, the lowest monthly pay for a firefighter would have increased from $1,108.88 ($5,473.68 in 2025) to $1,295.82 ($5,748.31 in 2025). The last round of talks was held on Friday, June 30, with the unionized firefighters voting to reject the city's last offer. That same day, the government rejected a plan proposed by the union for shift differential bonus pay. Following this, the firefighters' union informed the city government that they were prepared to commence strike action.

During contract negotiations, David Baker, the president of the police union, raised the possibility of a coordinated labor dispute against the city that would involve the unions representing the city's firefighters, police, and sanitation workers. However, this coalition failed to materialize, as on July 1, the sanitation workers voted 558 to 553 to accept the city's contract offer.

== Initial strike ==
=== Early strike activities ===
Early in the morning of Saturday, July 1, (Note: Sources vary on the exact time that the strike began. Per The Commercial Appeal, the strike began at midnight, while The New York Times reported that the strike began at 7 a.m.) approximately 1,400 Memphis firefighters went on strike. About 200 non-union firefighters, consisting primarily of individuals who held a rank higher than that of lieutenant, remained on the job. At the time, the Memphis Fire Department served an area that included about 800,000 people. Chandler said the government would not resume negotiations with the firefighters' union until they returned to work.

On the first day of the strike, 45 fires were reported over a period of four hours, which prompted a front-page coverage from Memphis's daily newspaper, The Commercial Appeal. Later that day, the city government was granted a temporary injunction that barred the striking firefighters from engaging in violence, from mass picketing, and from blocking the entrances of fire stations. However, Chancellor Robert Hoffmann, a judge of the Memphis Chancery Court, said that he would wait until Monday, July 3, to rule on a requested injunction from the city government that would declare the strike illegal. In total, 225 fires were reported on the first day of striking. In comparison, on a usual Saturday night, the Memphis Fire Department only answered about eight fire alarms.

=== Civil emergency and National Guard activation ===
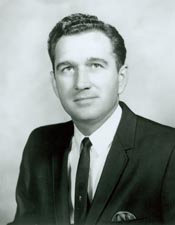
During the strike, Governor Ray Blanton ordered Tennessee Army National Guard troops to Memphis.

On Sunday, July 2, Chandler declared a civil emergency and requested that the Tennessee Army National Guard assist the city in firefighting and first responder activities. In response, the National Guard was activated by Governor Ray Blanton. Additionally, all public events were cancelled. The mayor also ordered a curfew for July 2 and July 3 from 10 p.m. to 6 a.m., with individuals found outside during those hours subject to questioning and possible arrest. The sale of alcohol was also prohibited, while gasoline was not allowed to be sold to anyone unless it was directly transferred into their automobile's fuel tank. Talks were held between the mayor's office and the union, though they were ultimately unproductive.

By the end of the day, about 1,100 personnel had been brought into the city to assist the non-union firefighters, including 850 National Guard members, 134 firefighters from the United States Navy and Marine Corps who were stationed at the nearby Naval Air Station, 102 firefighters from the Tennessee Forestry Service, and 20 firefighters from the Office of Civil Defense. With the assistance of these outside responders, the city was able to man 30 of their 50 fire stations. Additionally, the Tennessee Highway Patrol assisted the city in enforcing the curfew.

Fires continued to burn in Memphis over the course of the second day of striking, with an abandoned mill being destroyed in a fire that caused $1.7 million ($8.4 million in 2025) in damages. Additionally, several parts of Midtown were heavily damaged, though The New York Times reported that there had been no fire-related deaths up to that point. The newspaper also reported that, over the course of the weekend, there had been over 300 fires in the city. According to reporting from The Commercial Appeal, at one fire south of Downtown, several strikers heckled the first responders.

=== End of the strike ===
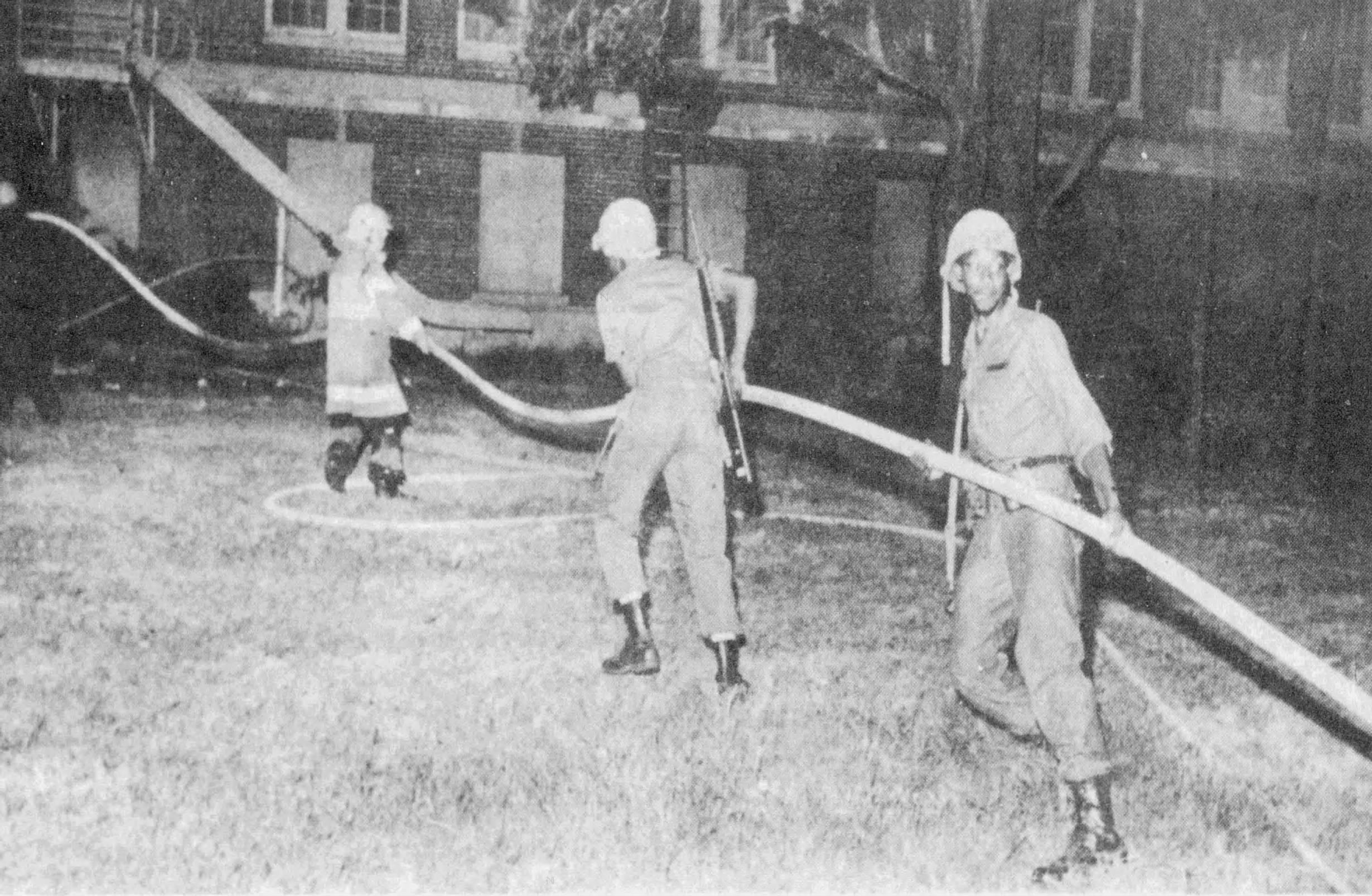
Guardsmen handling a hose for a firefighter

By July 3, city sanitation workers had begun to refuse to cross the firefighters' picket lines, leading to trash pileups throughout the city. By that time, four businesses in the city's Overton area had been destroyed by fires, causing about $1 million ($4.9 million in 2025) in damages. That same day, Chancellor Hoffman issued a court order requiring striking firefighters to return to work by 7 a.m. the following day. The order also provided for mediation via the Federal Mediation and Conciliation Service, with sessions to begin on July 5. The order also limited the picketing that could be performed by the union members, allowing for some informational picketing. Union leaders agreed to abide by the court order and were able to convince rank-and-file members in a closed meeting that day, though several vowed to recommence striking if the city did not meet the union's demands for a pay increase. On July 4, with the striking firefighters returning to work, the mayor lifted the city's curfew and National Guard members began to be called to the city's National Guard Armory for phased deactivation.

While sources vary on the exact number of fires that occurred during the strike, (Note: On the high end, a contemporary article from The New York Times placed the number of fires at 350, including 225 on the first day of the strike. Meanwhile, contemporary reporting from The Washington Post gave the figure as over 300, while United Press International reported over 200. Additionally, The Commercial Appeal reported in 2020 that there had been a total of 166 fires.) reporter Wayne King of The New York Times reported that there had been over 350 fires, with 50 regarded as major. This included a branch of the Memphis Public Library system on Vance Avenue. According to Major General Carl D. Wallace of the National Guard, there had been more fires in Memphis than there had been during the riots in 1968 that followed the assassination of Martin Luther King, Jr. In addition to the fires, several fire department ambulances had been damaged in acts of vandalism. (Note: According to police reports, on the first night of the strike, the tires on seven firefighting department vehicles had been slashed. By the following morning, only three of the department's 14 ambulances were in working order.) Speaking of the long-term impact of the fires, Memphis Fire Director Robert Walker said, "The scars will be there many years." In total, he estimated the damages that occurred during the strike at about $6 million ($29.6 million in 2025). Meanwhile, damages to fire department equipment and property were estimated at between $50,000 and $100,000 ($247,000 and $494,000 in 2025).

=== Allegations of arson ===
According to reporting from The New York Times, several city officials accused the striking firefighters of committing arson, which they claimed was responsible for the high number of fires that occurred over the course of the strike. Memphis Police Director E. Winslow Chapman stated that he believed that "90 to 95 percent" of the fires that had occurred on July 1 were caused by arson, while Walker estimated that 90 percent had been caused by arson. In a news conference, Chandler stated that he believed that the strikers had started most of the fires. Local 1784 leaders called the accusations "ridiculous" and instead blamed unknown arsonists for the fires. During the strike, several striking firefighters were arrested on charges of suspected arson.

== Continued negotiations ==
Following the firefighters' strike, mediation sessions were held between the city government and both the firefighters' union and the police union, who had still not reached an agreement with the city after months of negotiations. On July 13, the city government reached tentative agreements with the leadership of both unions that would have resulted in very similar contracts to those expressed in the city's initial offers with the unions. That same day, Mayor Chandler held a debate with Baker, the police union's president, which was broadcast on the local television station WKNO. Despite the agreements with the leaders, neither union ratified the contracts. The firefighters' union leaders decided not to hold a member vote on the agreement, instead opting to see what actions the police union would take. Meanwhile, in a July 15 vote, the police union's members voted by a ratio of nine to one to reject the tentative deal.

Over the next several days, negotiations continued, with a series of proposals and counteroffers being submitted between the government and the unions. A week after the police–mayor debate, the mayor announced that the city would cease further negotiations with the police union. Subsequently, Baker began openly discussing the possibility of a police strike. Within 24 hours of the mayor's announcement, the city announced that it had reached tentative agreements with the leadership of both the firefighters' and police unions. However, in a vote by the police union membership, approximately 91 percent voted against accepting the deal. For the firefighters' union, an initial division of the assembly vote saw the union members split about evenly, though a follow-up vote saw about 90 percent vote to reject the deal.

Through late July, the police union appealed to the city council to force arbitration, though the council opted not to get involved in the negotiations. The police union was also in talks with the Memphis Education Association about holding a petition drive to force a recall election on Mayor Chandler, though this did not come to fruition. While the police union resisted any job action through July, there is some evidence that union members engaged in a slowdown during this time. (Note: On Saturday, July 22, the Memphis Police Department reported that there had been 96 arrests. This was a noticeable decline from the 167 arrests reported the previous Saturday, July 15. However, union leaders denied that a slowdown had occurred and arrest rates soon returned to average.) By the following month, concerns over a police strike had continued to grow, and on August 8, the police union delivered via telegram a counteroffer to the city government. Mayor Chandler countered with a two-year contract that was ultimately rejected by the union in a vote of 288 in favor and 566 against. Following this vote, the police union announced that they planned to go on strike, with Baker setting a tentative date for a job action on August 13. This was chosen as the city was planning on a major influx of tourists for the anniversary of the death of Elvis Presley, with the strike expected to have a significant impact on the economy.

== Subsequent strikes ==
=== Initial police strike ===
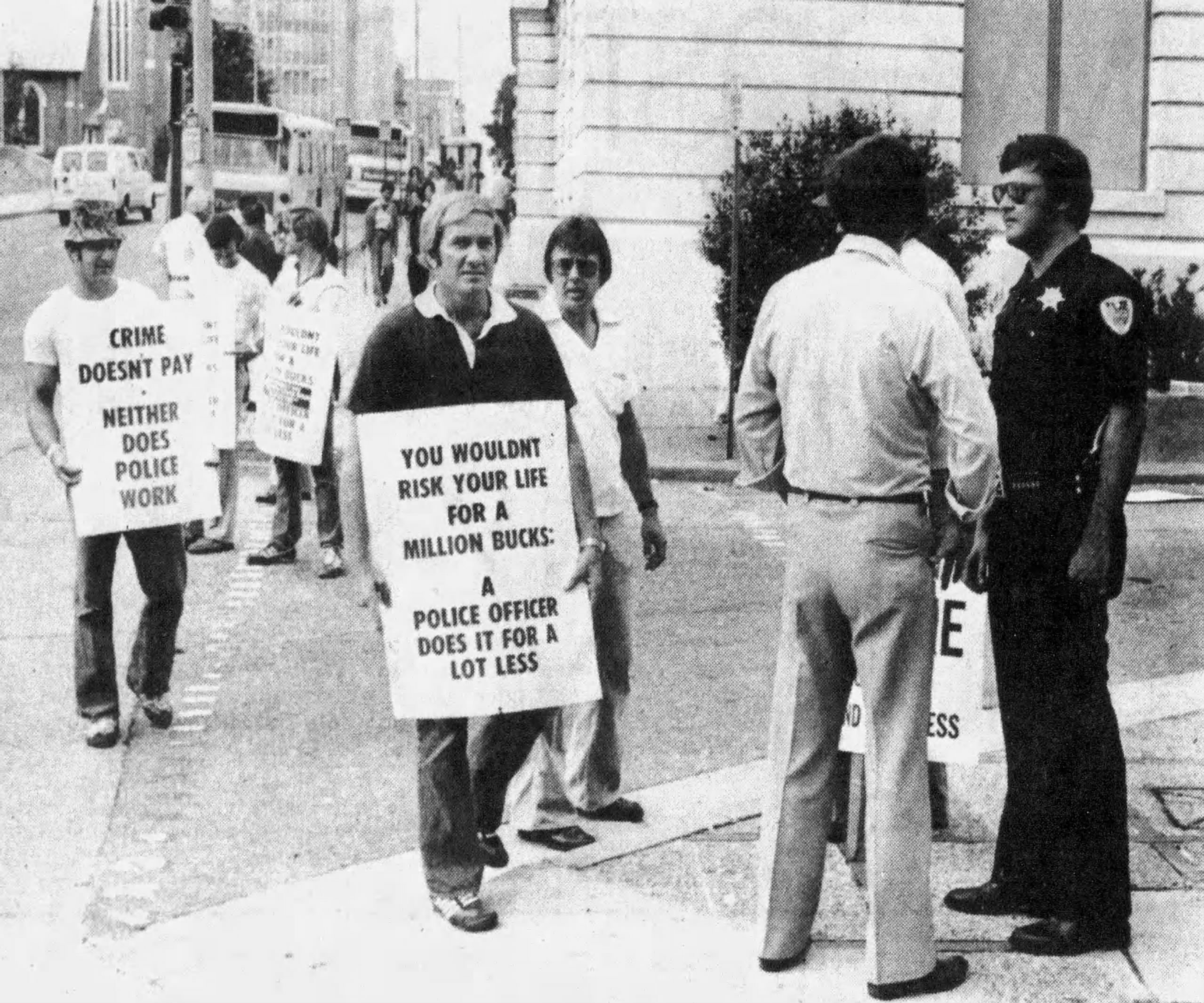
Striking officers outside the Downtown police station.

Unionized police officers commenced striking on Thursday, August 10. Baker, who had viewed the possibility of a strike as a means of gaining leverage in negotiations, reluctantly supported the labor action. The walkout, which involved about 1,100 officers, was performed by officers at the nonsupervisory ranks of patrolman and sergeant. The city government, similar to what it had done during the firefighters' strike, sought a court order from the Shelby County Chancery Court to force the striking police officers back to work. On August 11, the striking police officers received a court order requiring that they return to work. However, the striking officers disobeyed the order, prompting Mayor Chandler to declare another civil emergency that day. He also requested the assistance of the National Guard and instated a curfew from 8 p.m. to 6 a.m. The mayor stated that anyone found outside after dark would be arrested, though postal workers were exempt. In addition to the National Guard, the Shelby County Sheriff's Office provided officers to enforce the curfew.

On Saturday, August 12, Chancellor George Lewis told the striking officers to either return to work or turn in their badges, and subsequently, Mayor Chandler ordered that the officers be removed from the city government's payroll, which would have potentially cost the officers their pensions. That same day, Baker lost his position of power in the union to Chris Cothran, who The Commercial Appeal described as "a self-proclaimed radical". Additionally, a tear gas bomb was detonated at the Shelby County administration building in Downtown. Fearing more violence, higher-ranking non-striking police officers armed themselves with rifles and security was increased at City Hall. On Sunday, August 13, several strikers were arrested while picketing outside of a police precinct. On that same day, The Washington Post referred to the labor action as a "wildcat strike".

=== Firefighters' strike ===
"If Memphis goes up in smoke, it won't be our fault."

— An anonymous striking firefighter, quoted by United Press International, August 15, 1978

On Monday, August 14, about 1,400 unionized firefighters joined with the police officers in striking against the city. As a result of this wildcat strike, the city was left with about 150 high-ranking firefighters and 250 non-union police officers who were not on strike. That same day, National Guard troops arrived in the city to replace the striking city employees. National Guard troops established checkpoints across the city, and several troops, including those with armored personnel carriers and machine guns, guarded the police department's headquarters and several precinct stations. National Guard troops also performed firefighting duties, and about 50 pieces of firefighting equipment were moved to the National Guard Armory as a precaution against possible vandalism. That same day, with National Guard troops present, about 60 picketing police officers were arrested by non-union officers on charges that included curfew violation and breach of the peace. By mid-week, there were about 2,500 troops stationed in the city.

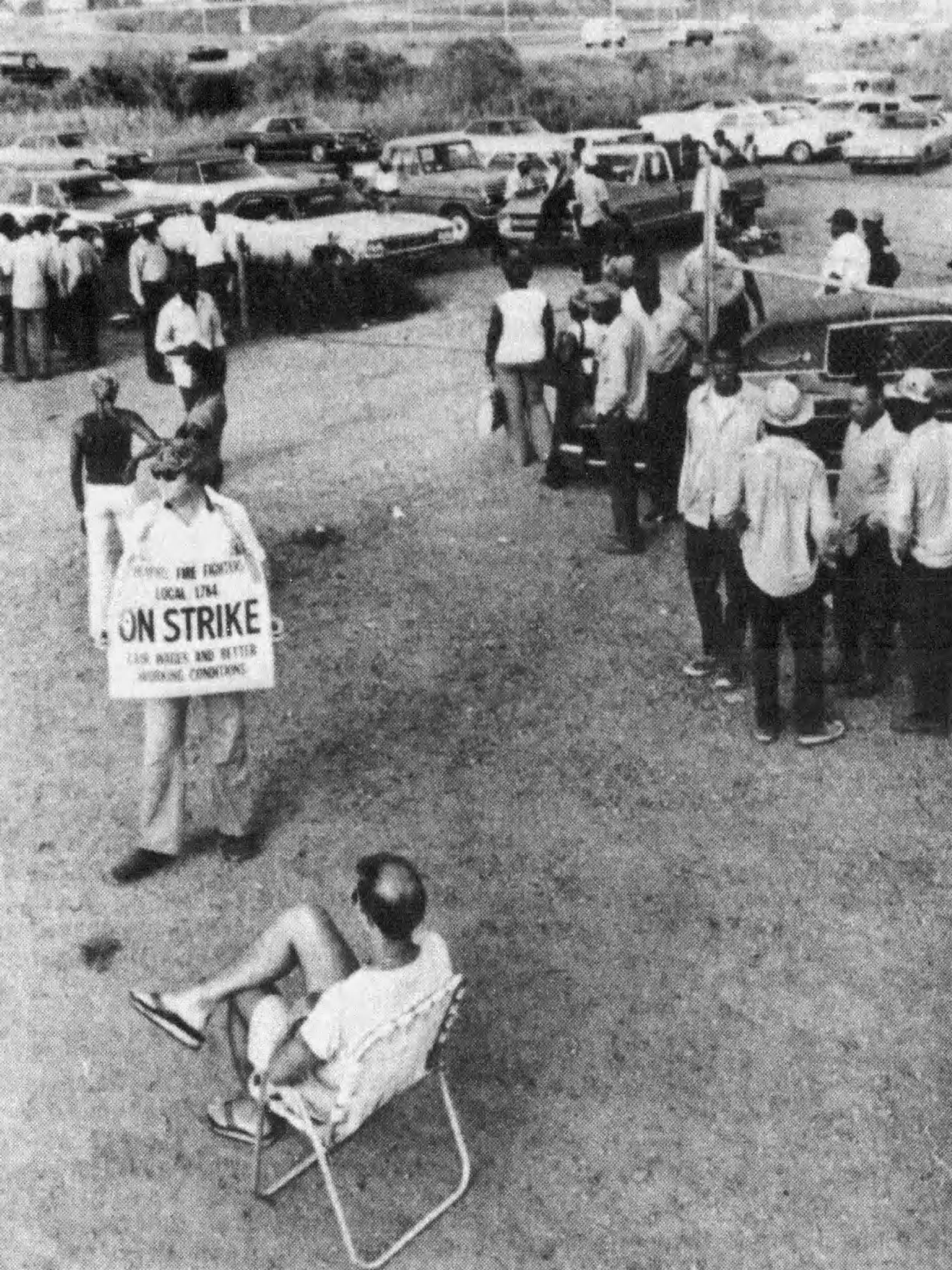
Striking firefighters urging sanitation workers to stay off the job

In a report published August 15, United Press International stated that there had been several bomb threats made against City Hall and the police department's headquarters and that both the headquarters and a precinct station had been the targets of a shooting. At a press conference, Mayor Chandler stated that several striking police officers had returned to work on Monday but returned to striking after receiving phone calls that included threats against them and their family members. That same day, the AFL-CIO, which represented about 60,000 workers in the city, raised the possibility of a citywide general strike, and sanitation workers largely began to honor the strikers' picket lines, with only 23 of the scheduled 1,036 workers reporting for work that day. Additionally, the Memphis Education Association's leadership voted to honor the picket lines once Memphis's schools opened on August 18. Also on August 15, Mayor Chandler made a proposal before the city council to have federal mediators decide between the city government's and the unions' last best offers. However, this proposition was derided by union officials, who again floated the idea of a citywide general strike.

=== Further negotiations ===
At 12:33 a.m. on August 16, Memphis and the greater Shelby County, Tennessee, area, experienced a large power outage. During the outage, which lasted for three hours, some instances of looting were reported near Graceland. (Note: Coincidentally, the power outage had occurred on the first anniversary of the death of Elvis Presley.) According to The Commercial Appeal, city officials initially suspected that the outage had been an act of sabotage, with the Federal Bureau of Investigation opening an investigation into the matter. However, the outage was later discovered to have been caused by a recently hired security guard at a substation in Cordova who had been drunk while on the job.

That same day, hundreds of striking police officers conducted a march to City Hall. At the same time, negotiations were underway between the two unions and the city government, with assistance from federal mediators. By this time, Governor Blanton had expressed support for the strikers and began pressuring the mayor to bring an end to the strike via binding arbitration. As part of this pressure, the governor submitted a bill to the city for the National Guard's services for both the 1978 strikes as well as the 1968 strike and threatened to withhold gasoline tax revenues to the city until these bills were paid.

On August 17, striking firefighters and police officers voted to approve a two-year contract with the city government that would bring their labor action to an end. While Mayor Chandler initially expressed dissatisfaction with the deals, he ultimately approved them. Firefighters and police officers returned to work in two waves on August 18 and 19, with the strike officially coming to an end on the latter. The two-year agreements contained provisions that were very similar to those originally proposed by the city government, including a 6 percent wage increase that would be retroactively applied to July and a 7.5 percent increase the following year. There would also be an additional pay raise of $30 ($133 in 2025) in April 1979. However, the mayor agreed to make the second-year pay increases subject to a renegotiation based on the results of a fact-finding committee. Additionally, the city government agreed to a policy of amnesty for strikers, except for those who had committed felonies.

== Aftermath and later history ==
According to journalist Michael Daly of New Times, the job actions in Memphis were the first time that a city experienced joint strike actions by members of both their fire and police departments. During mid-1978, several other American cities experienced labor disputes with their public sector employees. In Tennessee, this included police slowdowns in Nashville and Knoxville and the threat of a firefighters' strike in Chattanooga. According to Daly, the Memphis disputes served as a template for several of these other incidents. In Memphis, public sector labor disputes continued, with teachers going on strike later in the year.

The 1978 strikes marked the last time that a civil emergency was declared in Memphis until March 2020, when the mayor declared one as a result of the COVID-19 pandemic in Tennessee. During this pandemic, National Guard troops were also ordered into the city. According to The Commercial Appeal, the next time that a curfew was instated in Memphis was likely in June 2020 as a result of the George Floyd protests in Tennessee.

=== Fire and police unions in Memphis ===
On September 6, just several weeks after the firefighters and police officers had returned to work, the Memphis City Council drafted an amendment to the municipal charter that stipulated that any public employee who engaged in a job action against the city government would immediately be fired and stripped of seniority and other benefits. Additionally, neither the mayor nor city council would be able to interfere in the employee's termination. On November 7, in a citywide referendum, this measure passed with approximately 64 percent of the vote. The following year, the fact-finding committee submitted a report to the city government which resulted in no changes being made to the initially agreed 7.5 percent wage increase.

The strikes also caused divisions within the fire and police departments, with a 1983 study showing that at least four police officers resigned as a direct result of the police strike. Following the strikes, the public unions in Memphis experienced a decline in strength, and in a report published in 2004, the 1978 incidents were described as the last instance of a strike by municipal employees. By that time, according to a report published in Essays in Economic & Business History, the unions were operating more as lobbying groups than as traditional labor unions. However, in both 2014 and 2015, local media reported on a potential blue flu by some police officers, prompting comparisons to the 1978 strike. Further legal disputes between the city government and its public unions occurred in 2025, with WMC-TV further drawing comparisons between the ongoing labor disagreements and the 1978 strikes.

== See also ==
- History of Memphis, Tennessee
- List of incidents of civil unrest in the United States
- Timeline of Memphis, Tennessee
- Timeline of strikes in 1978

== Sources ==
- Chambliss, William J., ed. (2011). "Police Strikes and Blue Flu". Police and Law Enforcement. Key Issues in Crime and Punishment. Thousand Oaks, California: SAGE Publications. pp. 157–170. ISBN 978-1-4129-7859-0. OCLC 1253392449.
- Daly, Michael (October 2, 1978). "Anarchy in Memphis". New Times. Vol. 11, no. 7. New York City. pp. 30–42. ISSN 0092-2463. OCLC 1789075.
- Palmer, Charles (June 2004). "Economics, Grievances, Protective-Employee Unionization, and the 1978 Memphis Fire and Police Strikes". Essays in Economic & Business History. 22 (1): 183–197. ISSN 0896-226X. LCCN 87658048. OCLC 844690672 – via Directory of Open Access Journals.
- Sparger, Jerry R.; Giacopassi, David J. (1983). "Copping Out: Why Police Leave the Force". In Bennett, Richard R. (ed.). Police at Work: Policy Issues and Analysis. Perspectives in Criminal Justice No. 5. Published in cooperation with the Academy of Criminal Justice Sciences. Beverly Hills, California: SAGE Publications. pp. 107–124. ISBN 978-0-8039-1956-3. OCLC 9084512.
- Thieblot, Armand J. Jr.; Haggard, Thomas R. (1983). Union Violence: The Record and the Response by Courts, Legislatures, and the NLRB. Labor Relations and Public Policy Series No. 25. Philadelphia: Industrial Research Unit, Wharton School, University of Pennsylvania. ISBN 978-0-89546-040-0. ISSN 0075-7470. OCLC 9889081.
