= Henry Loeb =

American politician (1920–1992)

Mayor of Memphis
- In office January 1, 1968 – December 31, 1971
- Preceded by: William B. Ingram
- Succeeded by: J. Wyeth Chandler
- In office January 1, 1960 – October 12, 1963
- Preceded by: Edmund Orgill
- Succeeded by: Claude Armour

Personal details
- Born: December 9, 1920
- Died: September 8, 1992 (aged 71)

Military service
- Allegiance: United States
- Branch/service: United States Navy
- Battles/wars: World War II

Henry Loeb III (December 9, 1920 – September 8, 1992) was an American politician of the Democratic Party, who was mayor of Memphis, Tennessee, for two separate terms in the 1960s, from 1960 through 1963, and 1968 through 1971. He gained national notoriety in his second term for his role in opposing the demands of striking sanitation workers in early 1968. A segregationist, he opposed civil rights for African Americans and, instead, carried on the legacy of former Memphis mayor and political boss E. H. Crump.

== Background ==
Loeb's paternal grandparents were Jewish Germans who migrated from Germany to Memphis in the 1860s. His grandfather, Henry Loeb, founded Loeb's Laundry. Loeb III attended Phillips Academy and Brown University. He then became a lieutenant in the navy and served on a patrol boat in World War II. After the war, he gained popularity with the white middle class through appeals to his military service and through opposition to communism.

Loeb was Memphis's Public Works commissioner from 1956 to 1960. In 1959, he called for a "white unity" electoral ticket to oppose the increasingly-organized black vote in Memphis. He was re-elected to a second term in November 1967. Loeb converted to Episcopalianism immediately after he started his second term as mayor of Memphis on New Year's Day, 1968.

== Politics ==
Loeb was a conservative in politics. He supported segregation, declaring support for "separate but equal facilities" and describing court-ordered integration as "anarchy". During the 1967 election campaign, where he won his second term, he voiced increasingly antagonistic views regarding civil rights and labor, running on a platform that refused to make any concessions to black union workers. He won the 1967 election despite intense opposition from Memphis's black community.

The especially harsh conditions he imposed at the start of his 1968 term were a trigger for the Memphis sanitation strike. He received a large part of his criticism, as well as local support, for the local police's harsh and often violent treatment of strikers and sympathizers, which included local ministers, schoolchildren, and families of the workers. It was only after the April assassination of Martin Luther King Jr., and subsequent Federal pressure placed on the city by President Lyndon B. Johnson and the United States Department of Labor, that the city relented and recognized the public employees’ union AFSCME.

== Sanitation strike ==
Loeb was a notorious white supremacist, a segregationist and mayor during what came to be known as the Memphis sanitation strike of 1968. About 1,300 African-American members of Local 1733 of the American Federation of State, County and Municipal Employees (AFSCME) engaged in a 64-day strike for improved wages, working conditions, and union recognition.

Loeb had served previously as the head of the sanitation division (as the elected Public Works Commissioner) and, during his tenure, oversaw grueling work conditions, including dangerous faulty equipment and vehicles, no city-issued uniforms, no sick pay, no overtime, no time off, no hygienic requirements for the disposal of garbage (which was left curbside in buckets that leaked and smelled), no restrooms, and no grievance procedure for the numerous occasions on which they were underpaid. As a matter of record, even after working mandatory sometimes 18 hour shifts daily, they still qualified for welfare assistance and had to rely on it to avoid starving. During Loeb's tenure as Mayor, conditions for black sanitation workers worsened.

Loeb refused to take dilapidated trucks out of service or pay overtime when men were forced to work late-night shifts. On February 1, 1968, two Memphis garbage collectors, Echol Cole and Robert Walker, were crushed to death by a malfunctioning truck. Eleven days later, frustrated by the city’s response to the latest event in a long pattern of neglect and abuse of its black employees, 1,300 black men from the Memphis Department of Public Works went on strike. The union, which had been granted a charter by AFSCME in 1964, had attempted a strike in 1966, but failed in large part because workers were unable to arouse the support of Memphis’ religious community or middle class.

Sanitation workers, led by garbage-collector-turned-union-organizer T. O. Jones, and supported by the international president of the American Federation of State, County, and Municipal Employees (AFSCME), Jerry Wurf, demanded recognition of their union, better safety standards, and a decent wage.

The conflict and the racial violence that spread throughout the city in its wake brought Martin Luther King Jr. to visit Memphis in late March of that year, in order to assist AFSCME in their negotiations with Loeb and other city officials and work alongside other Civil Rights leaders in raising consciousness about the low pay and racist mistreatment suffered by the workers.

The night before his assassination in April 1968, King told the group of striking sanitation workers: "We've got to give ourselves to this struggle until the end. Nothing would be more tragic than to stop at this point in Memphis. We've got to see it through" (King, “I’ve Been to the Mountaintop,” 217). King believed the struggle in Memphis exposed the need for economic equality and social justice that he hoped his Poor People’s Campaign would highlight nationally.

On February 11, more than 700 men attended a union meeting and unanimously decided to strike. Within a week, the local branch of the National Association for the Advancement of Colored People passed a resolution supporting the strike. The strike might have ended on February 22, when the City Council, pressured by a sit-in of sanitation workers and their supporters, voted to recognize the union and recommended a wage increase. Loeb rejected the City Council vote, however, insisting that only he had the authority to recognize the union and refused to do so.

The following day, after police used sticks, kicks, punches, rifle butts, mace, and tear gas against nonviolent demonstrators marching to City Hall, Memphis’ black community was galvanized. Meeting in a church basement on February 24, 150 local ministers formed Community on the Move for Equality (COME), under the leadership of King’s longtime ally, local minister James Lawson. COME committed to the use of nonviolent civil disobedience to fill Memphis’ jails and bring attention to the plight of the sanitation workers. By the beginning of March, local high school and college students, nearly a quarter of them white, were participating alongside garbage workers in daily marches; and over 100 people, including several ministers, had been arrested.

King left Memphis the following day, but Southern Christian Leadership Conference’s (SCLC) James Bevel and Ralph Abernathy remained to help organize the protest and work stoppage. When the day arrived, however, a massive snowstorm blanketed the region, preventing King from reaching Memphis and causing the organizers to reschedule the march for March 28. Memphis city officials estimated that 22,000 students skipped school that day to participate in the demonstration. King arrived late and found a massive crowd on the brink of chaos. Lawson and King led the march together but quickly called off the demonstration as violence began to erupt. King was whisked away to a nearby hotel, and Lawson told the mass of people to turn around and go back to the church. In the chaos that followed, downtown shops were looted, and a 16-year-old was shot and killed by a police officer. Police followed demonstrators back to the Clayborn Temple, entered the church, released tear gas inside the sanctuary, and clubbed people as they lay on the floor to get fresh air.

Those events helped force a temporary resolution of the strike on the part of the city. Negotiations on April 16 brought an end to the strike and a promise of better wages.

== Personal and later life ==
Henry Loeb was married to the former Mary Gregg and they had two sons and a daughter. Loeb himself eventually left Memphis and moved to Forrest City, Arkansas, some 50 miles westward in St. Francis County where he lived on a large family estate. He was active in the Rotary Club, the Church of the Good Shepherd, and was instrumental in the early formation of the local Forrest City Area Humane Society. He owned an International Harvester dealership in Forrest City for many years and retired in the 1980s. He suffered a stroke in 1988, and died in September 1992.
