= J. Wyeth Chandler =

American politician

Mayor of Memphis, Tennessee
- In office January 1, 1972 – October 1, 1982
- Preceded by: Henry Loeb
- Succeeded by: J.O. Patterson, Jr.

J. Wyeth Chandler (February 21, 1930 – November 11, 2004) served as mayor of Memphis, Tennessee from 1972 to 1982. He was the adopted son of former Memphis mayor and U.S. Representative Walter Chandler. Chandler succeeded the controversial Henry Loeb, who battled local sanitation workers during a strike that brought Martin Luther King Jr. to Memphis in April 1968.

This violence-ridden episode in the city's history resulted in King's death by assassin James Earl Ray on April 4. Chandler spent much of his tenure dealing with the economic and social fallout from the strike and the killing, as the incidents gave the city a bad name among business and charitable interests for some years.

Chandler was mayor at the time of Elvis Presley's death in 1977, and during the police and firemen's strike the following year. Some Memphians criticized his administration as too "status quo", but he was undeniably popular, winning three consecutive elections.

After resigning from office in October 1982 to accept a judgeship appointment from the Governor of Tennessee Lamar Alexander, Chandler was succeeded by two interim mayors: first by J.O. Patterson, Jr. (the first-ever African-American to serve in the office), then by Wallace Madewell. The next regularly elected mayor was Richard Hackett, who served from 1983 to 1991.

== See also ==
- 1978 Memphis fire and police strikes - A series of municipal labor disputes that occurred during his mayoralty

Political offices
Preceded by Henry Loeb	Mayor of Memphis, Tennessee; 1972 - 1982	Succeeded by J.O. Patterson, Jr.
