= Walter Chandler =

American politician (1887–1967)

Walter "Clift" Chandler
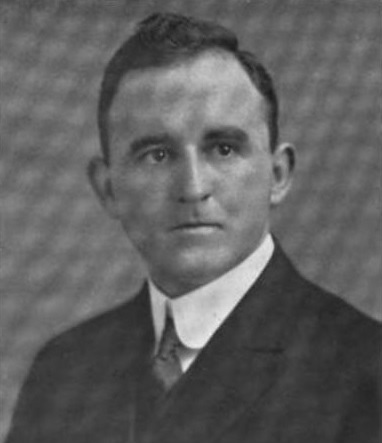

Member of the U.S. House of Representatives from Tennessee's 9th district
- In office January 3, 1935 – January 2, 1940
- Preceded by: E. H. Crump
- Succeeded by: Clifford Davis

Member of the Tennessee Senate
- In office 1921–1923

Member of the Tennessee House of Representatives
- In office 1917

Personal details
- Born: October 5, 1887 Memphis, Tennessee, U.S.
- Died: October 1, 1967 (aged 79) Memphis, Tennessee, U.S.
- Resting place: Forest Hill Cemetery; Memphis, Tennessee, U.S.
- Party: Democratic
- Spouse: Dorothy Wyeth (m. 1925)
- Children: John Wyeth Chandler, Lucia Chandler Outlan
- Education: University of Tennessee
- Profession: Teacher; journalist; lawyer

Military service
- Allegiance: United States
- Branch/service: United States Army
- Years of service: July 25, 1917 – April 19, 1919
- Rank: Captain
- Unit: One Hundred and Fourteenth Field Artillery
- Battles/wars: World War I

Walter "Clift" Chandler (October 5, 1887 – October 1, 1967) was an American politician from Tennessee and a Representative for the ninth district of Tennessee. He served as mayor of Memphis, Tennessee from 1940 to 1946 and in 1955.

== Biography ==
Chandler was born in Memphis, Tennessee, on October 5, 1887, to parents of Scots/English descent, William Henry Chandler and Knoxie (Clift) Chandler. He attended public schools before going to Knoxville for college where he was a member of the Tennessee Kappa chapter of Sigma Alpha Epsilon and later to earn his law degree at the University of Tennessee. He later taught school and reported for the Knoxville Sentinel.

He served as city attorney of Memphis 1928-1934; delegate to the Democratic National Conventions in 1940 and 1944; elected as a Democrat to the Seventy-fourth, Seventy-fifth, and Seventy-sixth Congresses and served from January 3, 1935, until his resignation on January 2, 1940, having been elected mayor of Memphis; reelected mayor in 1943 and served until September 1, 1946; resumed the practice of law; temporary president, Tennessee constitutional convention, in 1953; mayor of Memphis in 1955 for unexpired term

== Career ==
A member of the Tennessee General Assembly, Chandler served in the Tennessee state house of representatives in 1917. He served as a captain in the One Hundred and Fourteenth Field Artillery, Thirtieth Division, American Expeditionary Forces, from July 25, 1917, to April 19, 1919, during World War I. and then was a member of Tennessee state senate from 1921 to 1923. He married Dorothy Wyeth on October 10, 1925.

Chandler was elected U.S. Representative from Tennessee 9th District, and served from January 3, 1935 to January 2, 1940, when he resigned. He was mayor of Memphis, Tennessee, from 1940 to 1946, and served in that capacity again in 1955. He was also a delegate to the Democratic National Convention from Tennessee in 1940 and 1944.

Although supported by the E. H. Crump machine, Chandler made significant contributions to the world on his own. He was the author of Chapter 13 bankruptcy legislation. He filed the original suit in Baker v. Carr, the U.S. Supreme Court case that argued against Tennessee's status quo of seldom changing the boundaries of congressional districts, even though population growth in urban areas far outstripped the growth in rural areas. By 1960, the district lines had not been redrawn since 1900 despite a provision in the Constitution of Tennessee requiring them to be redrawn every 10 years. In some cases one state representative district might be more populous by a factor of ten than another, more rural district. The Supreme Court ruled in favor of Baker, viewing the case not as one of legislative jurisdiction, but as a case of insuring each individual's right to equal representation.

Chandler was considered a sensitive and thoughtful man by some, and that he retired from politics in disappointment after E. H. Crump failed to support him for a senate seat. Chandler was an active and contributing member of the West Tennessee Historical Society. His recollections of early life in Memphis provide one of the clearest and most lucid pictures of Memphis at the turn of the 20th century.

== Death ==
Chandler died in Memphis, Shelby County, Tennessee, on October 1, 1967, four days before his 80th birthday. He is interred at Forest Hill Cemetery in Memphis. He died in the same year his son, future mayor Wyeth Chandler, was elected to the first Memphis City Council. His son served as Mayor of Memphis from 1972 until 1982 and later as a judge.

== Legacy ==
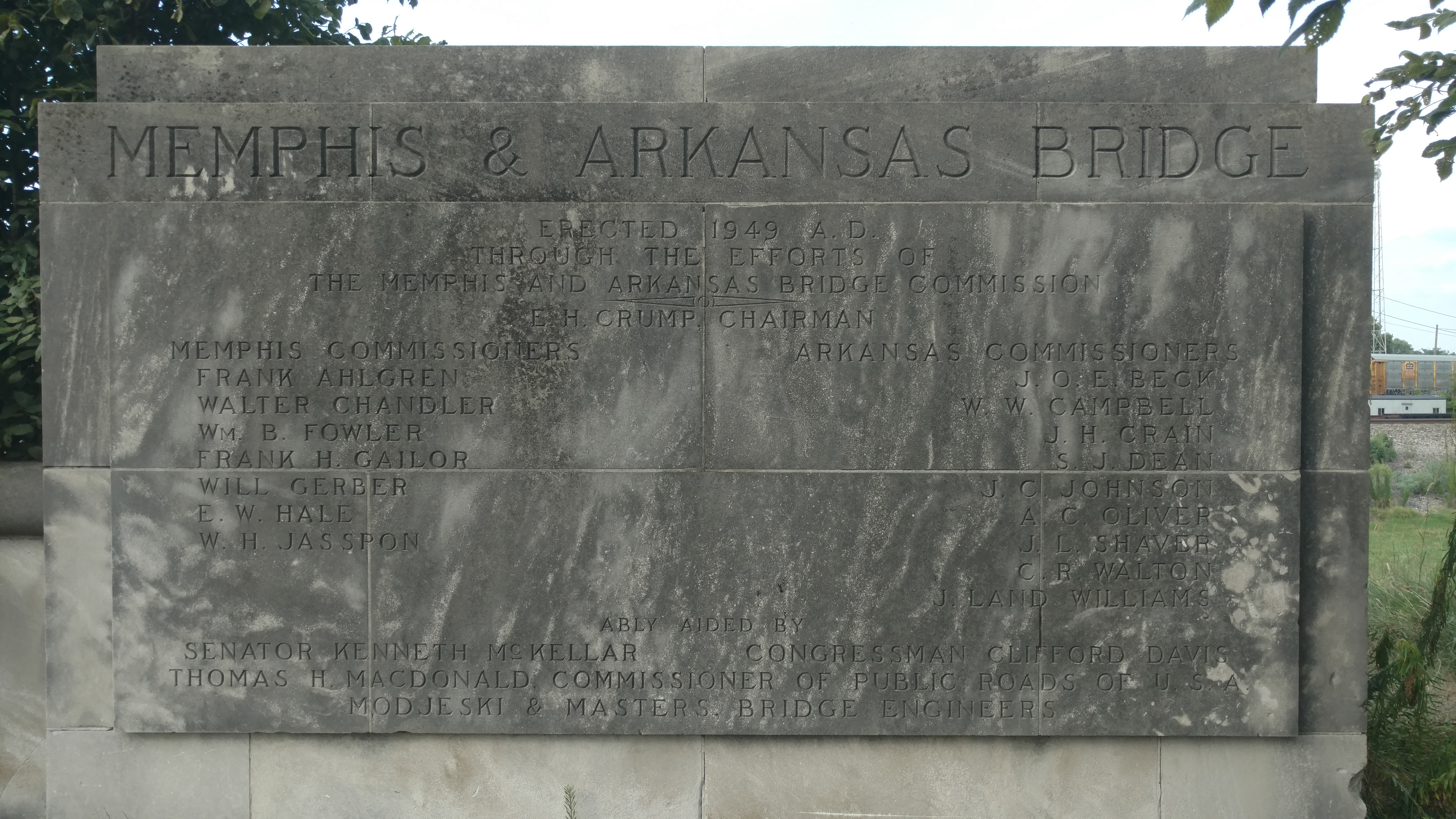
Original 1949 Memphis nameplate of Memphis & Arkansas Bridge, with Chandler listed as one of its commissioners.

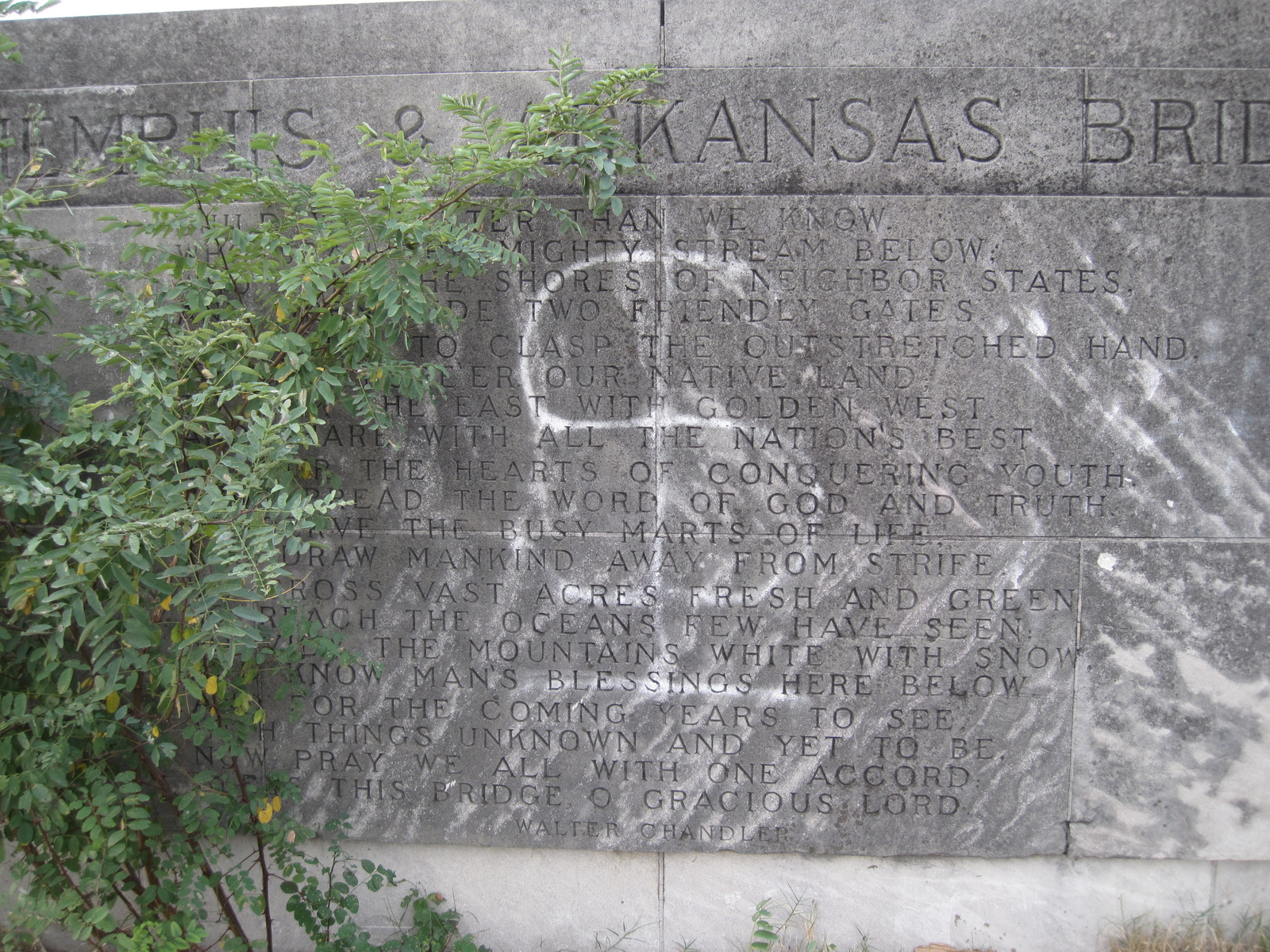
Photo of dedicatory poem opposite nameplate, officially attributed to Chandler.

While a member of the Crump machine, he served on the joint Memphis-Arkansas commission (headed by Crump) that oversaw the construction of the Memphis & Arkansas Bridge in 1949 on what is now Interstate 55. A nameplate listing him as a bridge commissioner, along with another nameplate containing a dedicatory poem officially attributed to Chandler, can be found at the Memphis end of the bridge.

U.S. House of Representatives
Preceded by E.H. Crump	Member of the U.S. House of Representatives from Tennessee's 9th congressional district 1935–1940	Succeeded by Clifford Davis
