= Flag of Memphis, Tennessee =

American municipal flag

Memphis
- Proportion: 3:5
- Adopted: July 1963
- Design: A field divided into three parts—in red, white, and blue—with their intersection overlaid by the Memphis city seal, and the white portion's outer edge angled from one half of the flag's length down to one third of the flag's length
- Designed by: Albert Mallory III
- Use: Variant flag (1963–1969)

The flag of Memphis, Tennessee, was designed by Albert Mallory III, then a student at the Memphis Academy of Arts, and was formally adopted by the city commission in July 1963. The flag was updated in 1967 to its current form, when a new city seal design by Alfred Lewis Aydelott was adopted by the city government, as it transitioned to a mayor-council form of government.

== Design ==
The flag consists of a field divided into three main parts, in red, white, and blue; with the city's seal depicted in gold with black detailing and positioned at the intersection of the three colors. The white portion of the flag, along the hoist, has an angled edge toward the fly that narrows as it proceeds downward; the progression starts from the top near the halfway point of the flag's length, angling downward to approximately one third of the flag's length.

== Symbolism ==
Colors in the flag are emblematic of the three states represented in the Memphis metropolitan area—red for Tennessee, white for Arkansas, and blue for Mississippi—with the angled edge of the white portion representing the angle of the Mississippi River. The flag is double-faced per the municipal code, allowing the city seal to be properly viewed from either side. The black lettering and artwork in the common city seal depiction differs with the city's municipal code, which stipulates the detailing should be in white. Another variant of the flag, seen from the flag's adoption until the city's sesquicentennial in 1969, disregarded the ordinance's instruction for an angled right edge of the white portion of the flag.

== See also ==
- Flag of Tennessee
