= Memphis Fire Services =

Fire department in Memphis, Tennessee

Coordinates: 35.1438°N 90.0550°W

Memphis Fire Department

Operational area
- Country: United States
- State: Tennessee
- City: Memphis

Agency overview
- Established: 1846
- Employees: 1789 (2015)
- Annual budget: $194,552,786 (2023)
- Staffing: Career
- Fire chief: Colin Burress
- EMS level: ALS
- IAFF: 1784

Facilities and equipment
- Divisions: 2
- Battalions: 12
- Stations: 58
- Engines: 56
- Trucks: 21
- Quints: 4
- Squads: 8
- Rescues: 3
- Tenders: 2
- Airport crash: 3
- Wildland: 6
- Fireboats: 1
- Rescue boats: 4

Website
- Official website
- IAFF website

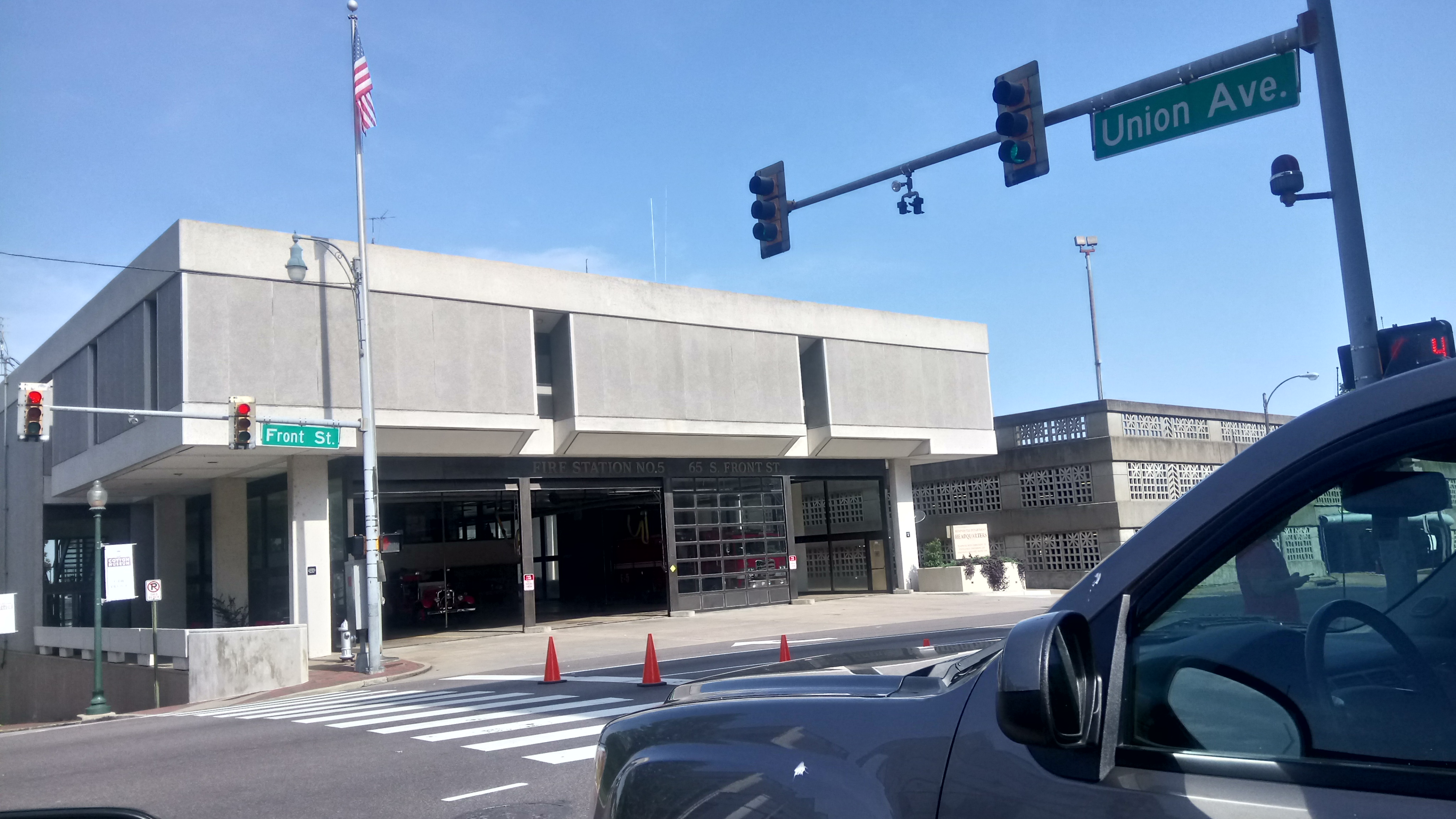
Former Fire Station 5, which housed the headquarters of the fire department until fall 2021

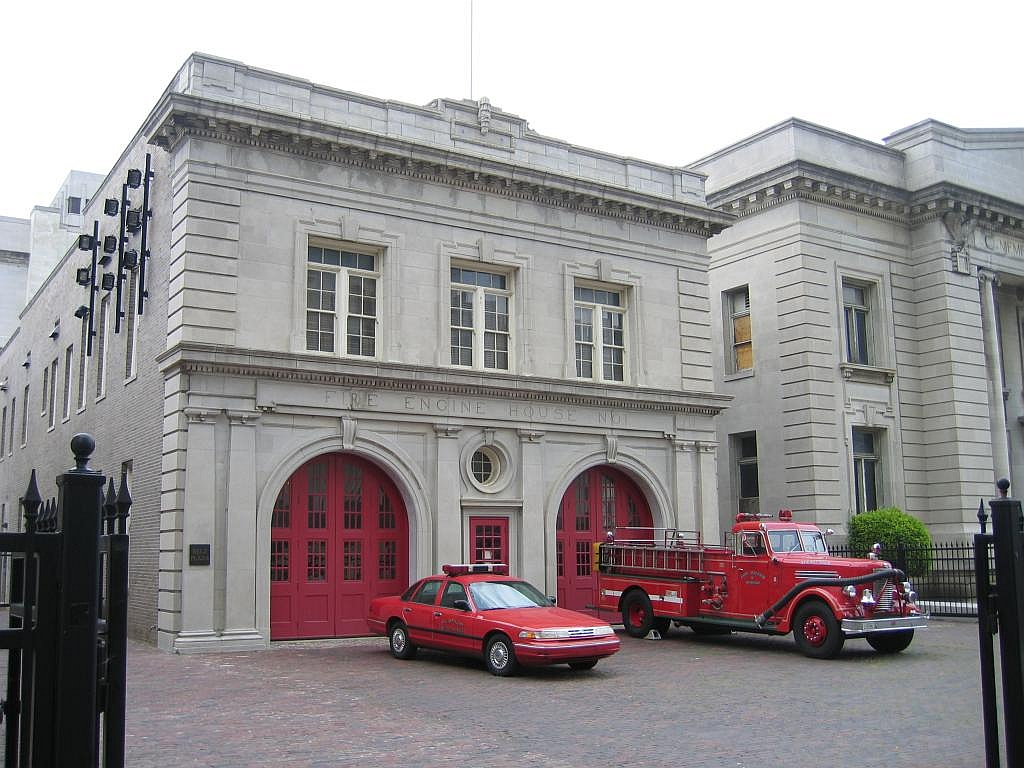
Memphis Fire Station 1, a museum

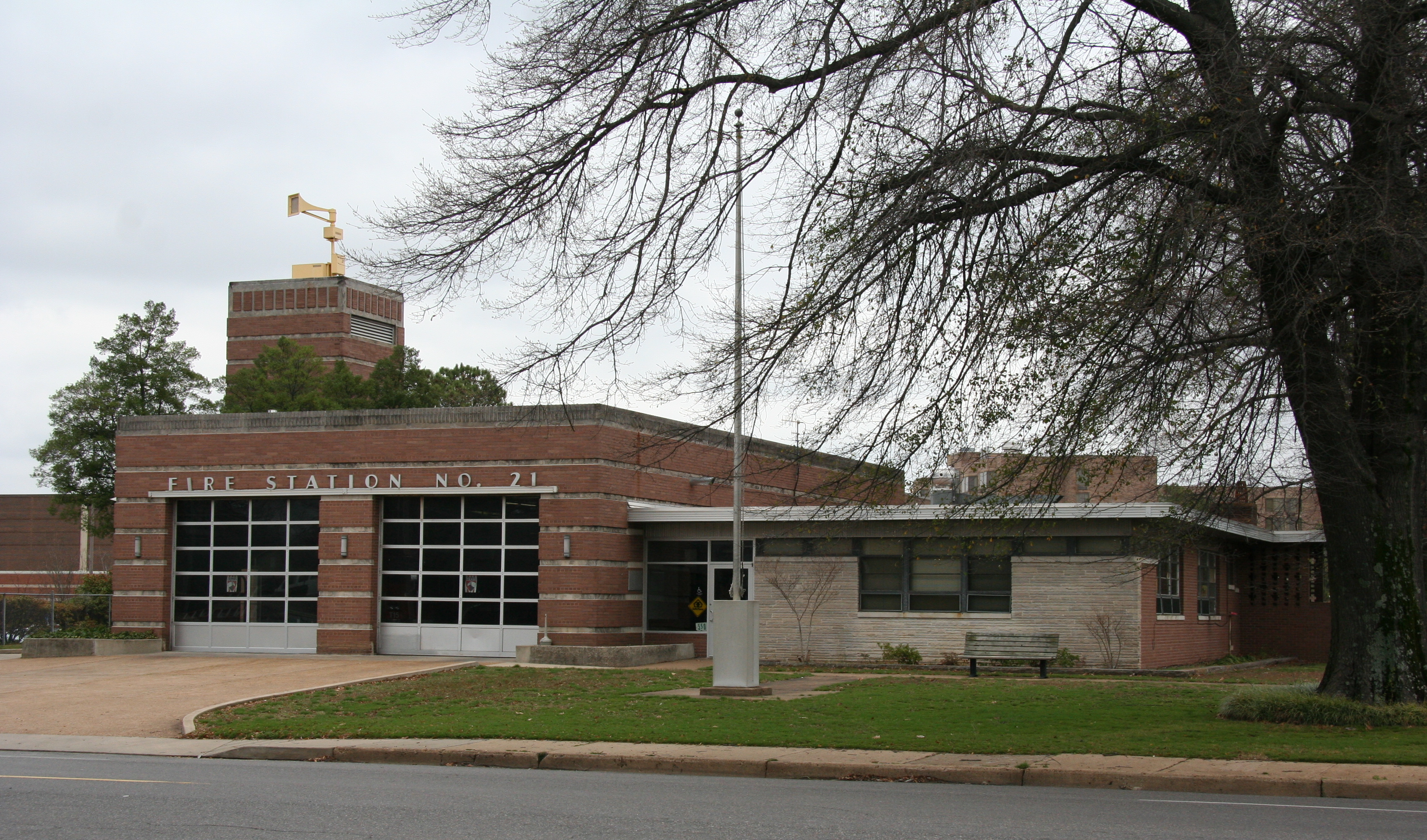
Memphis Fire Station 21, an example of a modern station

Memphis Fire Department provides fire protection and emergency medical services to the city of Memphis, Tennessee.

== History ==
The Memphis Fire Department got its start in 1846 when the first independent fire company was formed. It wasn't until 1859 when the department had its first fire chief. In 1966 the department started to provide ambulance service with 6,561 calls in the first year alone. The history and artifacts of the department are displayed at the Fire Museum of Memphis.

A replacement to Station 5 started construction in the summer 2020 and was opened in fall 2021. The new station is located at 400 Adams, and houses the firefighting equipment from the old station. Command staff headquarters was moved into a separate building on Avery.

== Stations and apparatus ==
Below is a list of all Memphis Fire Department fire stations and apparatus.

Fire Station Number	Address	Engine Company/Quint Company	Truck Company	Medic Unit	Specialized Unit	Chief Unit	Division	Battalion
1	235 Chelsea Ave.	Engine 1	Truck 2	Unit 11	Marine 1		1	1
2	474 S. Main St.	Engine 2				Battalion Chief 1	1	1
4	1460 N. 2nd St.	Engine 4				Battalion Chief 2	1	2
5	400 Adams Ave.	Engine 5				Division Chief 1	1	1
7	1017 Jefferson Ave.	Engine 7	Truck 13	Unit 1	EMS 202		1	1
8	625 Mississippi Blvd.	Engine 8	Truck 5	Unit 12			1	1
9	2785 Rudder Rd.		Truck 16		ARFF 1, ARFF 2 & ARFF 3	ARFF Chief	1	ARC
10	148 S. Parkway	Engine 10	Truck 9	Unit 21			1	3
11	1826 Union Ave.	Engine 11	Truck 4	Unit 4			1	6
13	333 E. Parkway N.	Engine 13		Unit 45			1	6
14	980 E. McLemore Ave.	Engine 14		Unit 3		Battalion Chief 3	1	3
15	688 N. Breedlove Ave.	Engine 15					1	2
16	2203 Lamar Ave.	Engine 16		Unit 16	Squad 16 Rehab 1	EMS Battalion Chief 20	1	6
17	611 National Ave.	Engine 17	Truck 8	Unit 23		Battalion Chief 5	2	5
18	3426 Southern Ave.	Engine 18					1	6
19	2248 Chelsea Ave.	Engine 19		Unit 30	Decon Trailer		1	2
20	2034 S. Lauderdale	Engine 20				EMS Chief 201	1	3
21	550 S. Mendenhall	Engine 21	Truck 15	Unit 7		Battalion Chief 7	2	7
22	2788 Lamar Ave.	Engine 22	Truck 7			Battalion Chief 6	1	6
23	3468 Jackson Ave.	Engine 23		Unit 15			2	5
24	4472 Powell	Engine 24		Unit 5	Brush Truck 3		2	5
25	4735 Willow	Engine 25		Unit 26	Brush Truck 5 & Rescue 1		2	7
26	3345 Millington Rd.	Engine 26	Truck 11	Unit 2			1	2
27	2530 Whitney Blvd.	Engine 27		Unit 22	Rescue 3		2	11
28	1510 Chelsea Ave.	Engine 28		Unit 20			1	2
29	2147 Elvis Presley Blvd.	Engine 29		Unit 17	Rescue 2		1	3
30	1150 Getwell Rd.	Engine 30		Unit 34			2	7
31	4258 Overton Crossing	Engine 31					2	11
32	1670 Channel Dr.	Engine 32					1	3
33	2555 Winchester Rd.	Engine 33	Truck 16	Unit 19	Collapse Trailer		1	ARC
34	3909 Knight Arnold Rd.	Engine 34		Unit 8		Battalion Chief 8	1	8
35	3505 S. Mendenhall Rd.	Engine 35	Truck 17	Unit 24	Brush Truck 2		2	10
36	3215 S. 3rd St.	Engine 36	Truck 19	Unit 6	Brush Truck 6		1	9
37	3950 Weaver Rd.	Quint 37			Brush Truck 1		1	9
38	4715 Horn Lake Rd.	Engine 38	Truck 24	Unit 9			1	9
39	1025 E. Raines	Engine 39				Battalion Chief 9	1	9
40	2231 E. Shelby Dr.	Engine 40		Unit 10			1	8
41	2161 Ridgeway	Engine 41	Truck 20	Unit 14			2	7
42	3242 Fontaine	Engine 42			High Pressure		1	8
43	1253 E. Holmes	Engine 43	Truck 18	Unit 25			1	9
44	220 N. Humphreys Blvd.	Engine 44			Brush Truck 4, MCI Trailer & ASAP	Division Chief 2	2	7
45	5185 S. 3rd St.	Engine 45			Rescue Boat 4		1	9
46	3423 Scenic Hwy.	Engine 46		Unit 41			2	11
47	3510 Coleman Rd.	Engine 47	Truck 23	Unit 13		Battalion Chief 11	2	11
48	4985 Raleigh-LaGrange Rd.	Quint 48			Rehab 2		2	5
49	4351 New Allen Rd.	Engine 49					2	11
50	4255 E. Raines Rd.	Engine 50	Truck 21				1	8
51	5921 Shelby Oaks Dr.	Engine 51	Truck 10	Unit 29		EMS Lieutenant 203	2	5
52	6675 Winchester Rd.	Engine 52		Unit 33			2	10
53	5881 E. Raines Rd.	Engine 53				Battalion Chief 10	2	10
54	595 N. Sanga Rd.	Quint 54	Truck 30	Unit 18			2	4
55	4602 Riverdale Rd.	Engine 55	Truck 27	Unit 28	County Engine & Unit 63		2	10
56	7495 Reese Rd.	Engine 56				Battalion Chief 4	2	4
57	4930 Pleasant Hill	Quint 57				EMS Chief 204	1	8
58	8395 Dexter Rd.	Engine 58		Unit 32			2	4
59	2870 Rockcreek Pkwy.	Engine 59		Unit 30			2	4

== See also ==
- 1978 Memphis fire and police strikes
