= J. O. Patterson Jr. =

American politician

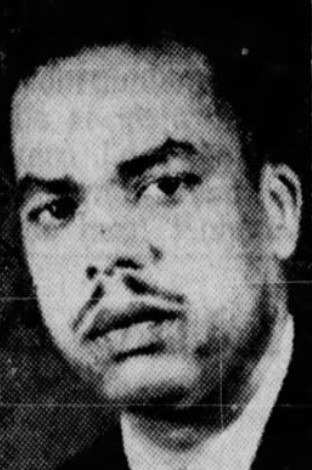

Mayor of Memphis, Tennessee
- In office October 1, 1982 – October 21, 1982
- Preceded by: J. Wyeth Chandler
- Succeeded by: Wallace Madewell

Member of the Memphis City Council

Member of the Tennessee State Senate

Member of the Tennessee House of Representatives

Personal details
- Born: May 28, 1935 Memphis, Tennessee, U.S.
- Died: June 25, 2011 (aged 76) Memphis, Tennessee, U.S.
- Cause of death: kidney failure
- Resting place: Memphis Memorial Park Cemetery Memphis, Tennessee
- Parents: J. O. Patterson Sr. (father); Deborah Indiana Mason (mother)
- Occupation: Former mayor of Memphis, Tennessee 1982, state legislator, bishop, pastor, attorney and mortician

James Oglethorpe Patterson Jr. (28 May 1935 – 25 June 2011) was a Holiness Pentecostal minister in the Church of God in Christ and a former mayor of Memphis, Tennessee, the first African-American to hold the office.

== Biography ==
Patterson was born in Memphis, the son of the first international Presiding Bishop of the Church of God in Christ (COGIC), J. O. Patterson Sr. (1912–1989) and Deborah Indiana Mason (1914–1985). He was the grandson of COGIC founder Bishop Charles Harrison Mason (1864–1961) and cousin of the late Presiding Bishop of COGIC Gilbert E. Patterson (1939–2007). He received a Bachelor of Arts degree in business administration from Fisk University in Nashville, Tennessee in 1958, a Master of Religion degree in 1985 from Memphis Theological Seminary, and a Doctor of Jurisprudence degree in 1963 from DePaul University, Chicago, Il.

He practiced law and then became active in state and local political life as a state representative for one term, a state senator for two terms, a Memphis City Councilman for five terms and interim mayor of Memphis (for 20 days total) in 1982, following the resignation of J. Wyeth Chandler; after the statutory 20 days, he was succeeded by Wallace Madewell for a short period. (The next regularly-elected mayor was Richard Hackett). He also served as a delegate to the Tennessee Constitutional Convention and the Democratic National Convention in 1972, 1976 and 1980.

He was elevated and ceremonially consecrated by his father to the bishopric in November 1985. He served as the pastor of the Pentecostal Temple Church Of God In Christ in Memphis, Tennessee a congregation of 2,500 active members, the Jurisdictional Prelate of the denomination's 1st Ecclesiastical Headquarters Jurisdiction of Tennessee and the COGIC, Inc. Chairman of the General Assembly. Bishop Patterson served as the president of J. O. Patterson Mortuary, Inc., a contributing writer for the Official COGIC Manual, a member of the COGIC Legal Counsel, a member of the board of directors of the C. H. Mason Foundation, a developer of many inner-city and urban initiatives. He continued the J. O. Patterson crusade, broadcast and media ministries established by his father.

As chairman of the General Assembly, Patterson supervised all sessions of the supreme legislative and judicial authority of the Church of God in Christ, Inc., the only entity of the church that has the power to express the doctrines and creeds of the church.

On Saturday, June 25, 2011, Bishop Patterson died of kidney failure at the age of 76. He died at a local hospital at 4:27 pm. His funeral was held on July 1, 2011 at the Mason Temple Church of God in Christ in Memphis, Tennessee. Bishop Charles E. Blake officiated over the funeral.

== See also ==
- List of first African-American mayors
