= 2026 Tennessee Senate election =

- November 3, 2026

17 of 33 seats in the Tennessee Senate 17 seats needed for a majority
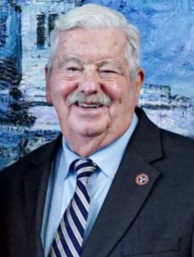

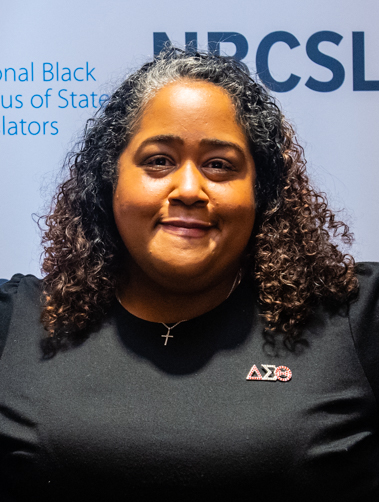
Leader	Randy McNally (retiring)	Raumesh Akbari
Party	Republican	Democratic
Leader's seat	5th–Oak Ridge	29th–Memphis
Current seats	27	6
Seats needed	Steady	▲11
Seats up	13	4
- Map of the incumbents: Republican incumbent Republican incumbent retiring Democratic incumbent No election
Incumbent Speaker
Randy McNally
Republican

The 2026 Tennessee Senate election was held on November 3, 2026. Seventeen members of the thirty-three member Tennessee Senate, the upper chamber of Tennessee's state legislature, will be elected. The elections will coincide with the governor, U.S. House, and state house elections. The primary elections was held on August 6, 2026. Tennessee has open primaries, meaning that any voter can choose to vote on either a Republican or Democratic ballot during primary elections.

== Partisan background ==
In the 2024 presidential election in Tennessee, Republican Donald Trump won 27 of the 33 state senate districts, while Democrat Kamala Harris won six. Going into the 2026 elections, Republicans hold 27 seats in the Tennessee State Senate, while Democrats hold six.

After the 2020 redistricting process, which was led by Republicans, most state senate districts strongly favor one party, leaving few districts that are considered competitive.

2024 presidential data by senate district Trump: 50–60%; 60–70%; 70–80%; 80–90%; Harris: 50–60%; 60–70%; 70–80%; 80–90%

== Retirements ==
=== Republicans ===
- District 5: Randy McNally, speaker of the Tennessee Senate and lieutenant governor of Tennessee

== Predictions ==
Source	Ranking	As of
Sabato's Crystal Ball	Safe R	January 22, 2026
State Navigate	Safe R	October 24, 2026

== Summary of results ==
No.	Incumbent	Party	Elected senator	Outcome
1st	J. Adam Lowe	Rep	TBD	Rep hold
3rd	Rusty Crowe	Rep	TBD	Rep hold
5th	Randy McNally	Rep	TBD	
7th	Richard Briggs	Rep	TBD	
9th	Steve Southerland	Rep	TBD	Rep hold
11th	Bo Watson	Rep	TBD	
13th	Dawn White	Rep	TBD	
15th	Paul Bailey	Rep	Paul Bailey	Rep hold
17th	Mark Pody	Rep	TBD	
19th	Charlane Oliver	Dem	Charlane Oliver	Dem hold
21st	Jeff Yarbro	Dem	Jeff Yarbro	Dem hold
23rd	Kerry Roberts	Rep	TBD	
25th	Ed Jackson	Rep	Ed Jackson	Rep hold
27th	Jack Johnson	Rep	TBD	
29th	Raumesh Akbari	Dem	Raumesh Akbari	Dem hold
31st	Brent Taylor	Rep	TBD	
33rd	London Lamar	Dem	TBD	Dem hold

== Background ==
No.	Counties	2022 state senate margin
1st	Bradley, McMinn, Meigs, Rhea	R+66.1
3rd	Carter, Johnson, Washington	R+49.9
5th	Anderson, Knox, Loudon	R+99.9
7th	Knox	R+24.7
9th	Cocke, Greene, Hamblen, Sevier, Unicoi	R+65.8
11th	Hamilton	R+100
13th	Rutherford	R+29.4
15th	Cumberland, Jackson, Putnam, Smith, Van Buren, White	R+100
17th	Davidson, Wilson	R+100
19th	Davidson	D+65.8
21st	Davidson	D+53.4
23rd	Cheatham, Dickson, Humphreys, Hickman, Robertson	R+100
25th	Crockett, Decatur, Dyer, Henderson, Lake, Perry, Madison	R+58.8
27th	Williamson	R+100
29th	Shelby	D+100
31st	Shelby	R+32.6
33rd	Shelby	D+62.81

== District 1 ==
District 1 election, Republican primary

Election not currently contested by any other political party or independent politician.
Nominee	J. Adam Lowe	Dennis H. Beavers	Teresa Congioloso
Party	Republican	Republican	Republican
Incumbent Senator
J. Adam Lowe
Republican

District 1 covers much of rural East Tennessee bordering Hamilton County and Georgia. The district includes all of Rhea, Meigs, and McMinn counties, and part of Bradley County. Communities in the district include Dayton, Decatur, Athens, and Cleveland.

=== Republican primary ===
==== Candidates ====
===== Nominee =====
- J. Adam Lowe, incumbent senator

===== Eliminated in primary =====
- Teresa Congioloso, real estate professional
- Dennis H. Beavers, disqualified candidate for this district in 2022

==== Results ====
2026 Tennessee Senate election, 1st district (Republican primary)
Party	Candidate	Votes	%
Republican	J. Adam Lowe (incumbent)	15,314	65.2
Republican	Teresa Congioloso	4,489	19.1
Republican	Dennis H. Beavers	3,694	15.7

== District 3 ==
District 3 election, Republican primary

Election not currently contested by any other political party or independent politician.
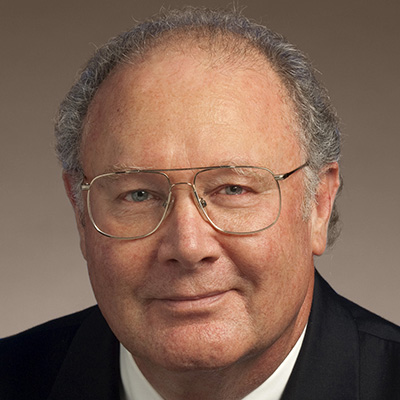

Nominee	Rusty Crowe	Dan Pohlgeers
Party	Republican	Republican
Incumbent Senator
Rusty Crowe
Republican

District 3 is based in Johnson City, the southernmost Tri-Cities, covering all of Johnson, Washington, and Carter County. Other communities in the district include Elizabethton, Jonesborough, Erwin, Oak Grove, and Unicoi.

=== Republican primary ===
==== Candidates ====
===== Nominee =====
- Rusty Crowe, incumbent senator

===== Eliminated in primary =====
- Dan Pohlgeers, businessman

==== Results ====
2026 Tennessee Senate election, 3rd district (Republican primary)
Party	Candidate	Votes	%
Republican	Rusty Crowe (incumbent)	15,820	59.8
Republican	Dan Pohlgeers	10,621	40.2

== District 5 ==
District 5 election
Nominee	Jimmy Matlock	David Miller
Party	Republican	Democratic
Incumbent Senator
Randy McNally
Republican

District 5 covers all of Anderson and Loudon counties, and part of Knox County in the Knoxville metropolitan area, including some of Knoxville proper, as well as the surrounding communities of Clinton, Lenoir City, Loudon, Tellico Village, Oliver Springs, and northern Oak Ridge.

Incumbent Republican Randy McNally announced his retirement on February 26, citing health concerns. McNally has represented District 5 in the Tennessee Senate for 10 terms, having first been elected in 1986. His retirement ends a legislative career spanning 40 years.

=== Republican primary ===
==== Candidates ====
===== Nominee =====
- Jimmy Matlock, former state representative from the 21st district (2007–2019) and candidate for Tennessee's 2nd congressional district in 2018

===== Withdrawn or disqualified candidatesy =====
- Stacey Campfield, former senator from the 7th district (2010–2014) and state representative from the 18th district (2005–2010)

==== Declined ====
- Randy McNally, incumbent senator

==== Results ====
2026 Tennessee Senate election, 5th district (Republican primary)
Party	Candidate	Votes	%
Republican	Jimmy Matlock	21,911	100

=== Democratic primary ===
==== Nominee ====
- David Miller, teacher

==== Results ====
2026 Tennessee Senate election, 5th district (Democratic primary)
Party	Candidate	Votes	%
Democratic	David Miller	9,320	100

== District 7 ==
District 7 election
Nominee	Richard Briggs	Bryan Langan
Party	Republican	Democratic
Incumbent Senator
Richard Briggs
Republican

District 7 covers swath of Knox County, including parts of downtown Knoxville, as well as nearby suburbs such as Farragut.

=== Republican primary ===
==== Candidates ====
===== Nominee =====
- Richard Briggs, incumbent senator

===== Eliminated in primary =====
- Kent Morrell, candidate for this district in 2022

==== Results ====
2026 Tennessee Senate election, 7th district (Republican primary)
Party	Candidate	Votes	%
Republican	Richard Briggs	13,686	66.3
Republican	Kent Morrell	6,948	33.7

=== Democratic primary ===
==== Nominee ====
- Bryan Langan, nominee for this district in 2022

==== Results ====
2026 Tennessee Senate election, 7th district (Democratic primary)
Party	Candidate	Votes	%
Democratic	Bryan Langan	11,876	100

== District 9 ==
District 9 election, Republican primary

Election not currently contested by any other political party or independent politician.
Nominee	Steve Southerland	Chad Huntsman
Party	Republican	Republican
Incumbent Senator
Steve Southerland
Republican

District 9 is located to the northeast of Knoxville, and stretches to areas outside of the Tri-Cities region. It includes parts of the Morristown Metropolitan Area. It covers Sevier, Greene, Hamblen, Cocke, and Unicoi counties. Notable cities in the district include Morristown, Newport, Gatlinburg, and Greeneville.

=== Republican primary ===
==== Candidates ====
===== Declared =====
- Chad Huntsman, pharmacist
- Steve Southerland, incumbent senator

==== Results ====
2026 Tennessee Senate election, 9th district (Republican primary)
Party	Candidate	Votes	%
Republican	Chad Huntsman		
Republican	Steve Southerland (incumbent)		

== District 11 ==
District 11 election
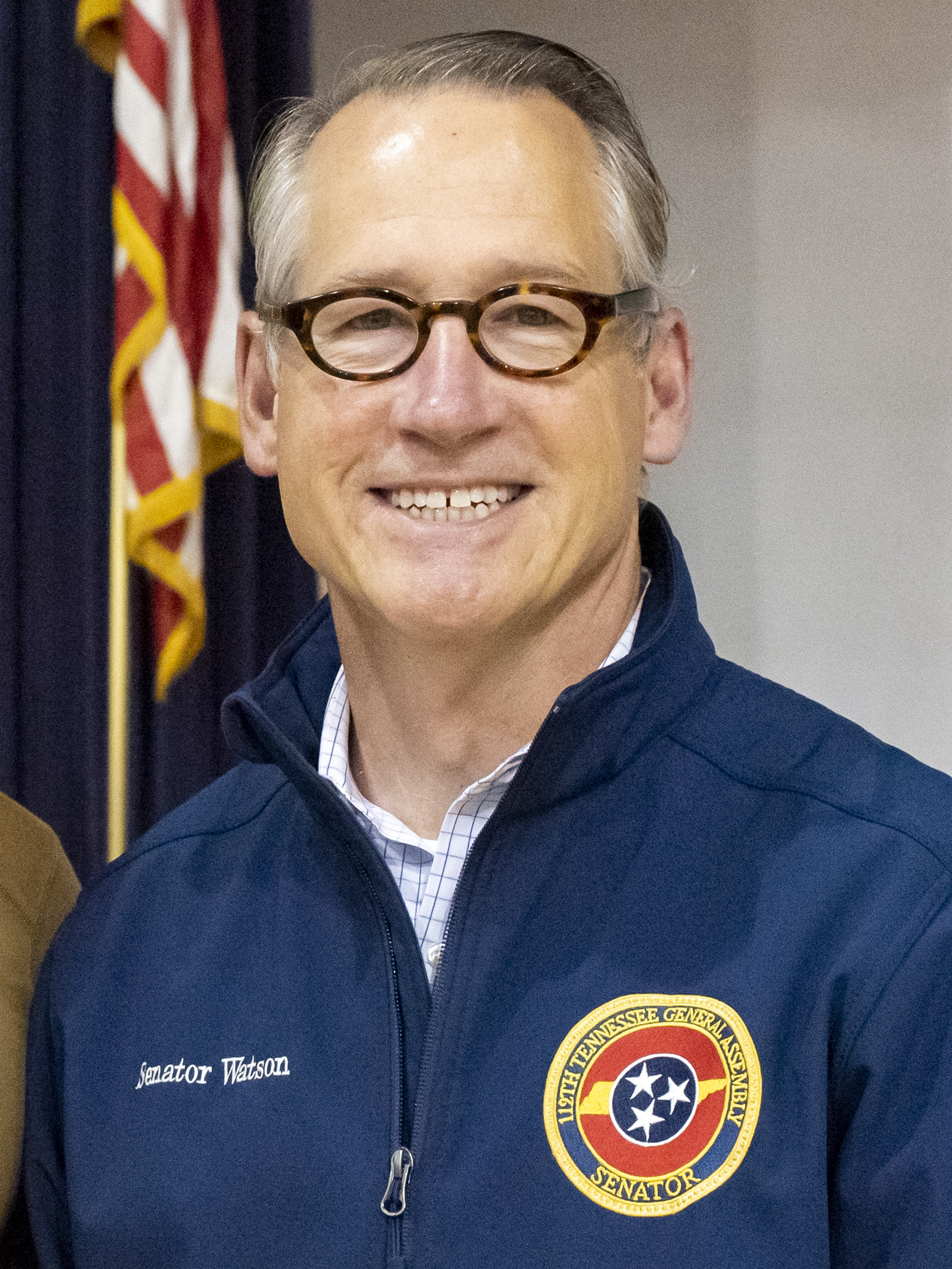

Nominee	Bo Watson (presumptive)	TBD
Party	Republican	Democratic
Incumbent Senator
Bo Watson
Republican

District 11 is based in the northern suburbs of Chattanooga in Hamilton County, including some of the city proper, as well as Soddy-Daisy, Middle Valley, Signal Mountain, Harrison, and part of Collegedale and Red Bank.

=== Republican primary ===
==== Presumptive nominee ====
- Bo Watson, incumbent senator

==== Results ====
2026 Tennessee Senate election, 11th district (Republican primary)
Party	Candidate	Votes	%
Republican	Bo Watson (incumbent)		

=== Democratic primary ===
==== Candidates ====
===== Declared =====
- Steven Overheim
- Tim Roberts, candidate for state representative from the 26th district in 2022

==== Results ====
2026 Tennessee Senate election, 11th district (Democratic primary)
Party	Candidate	Votes	%
Democratic	Steven Overheim		
Democratic	Tim Roberts		

== District 13 ==
District 13 election
Nominee	Dawn White (presumptive)	Angela Evans (presumptive)
Party	Republican	Democratic
Incumbent Senator
Dawn White
Republican

District 13 is based in Murfreesboro, including most of the city proper and part of Smyrna and western Rutherford County.

=== Republican primary ===
==== Presumptive nominee ====
- Dawn White, incumbent senator

==== Results ====
2026 Tennessee Senate election, 13th district (Republican primary)
Party	Candidate	Votes	%
Republican	Dawn White (incumbent)		

=== Democratic primary ===
==== Presumptive nominee ====
- Angela Evans

==== Results ====
2026 Tennessee Senate election, 13th district (Democratic primary)
Party	Candidate	Votes	%
Democratic	Angela Evans		

== District 15 ==
District 15 election
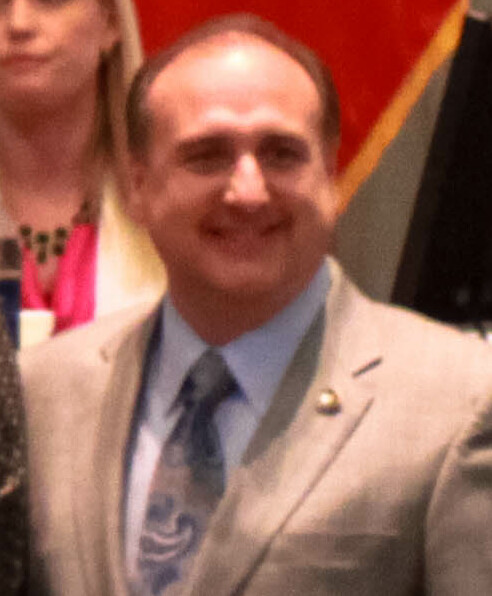
Nominee	Paul Bailey (presumptive)
Party	Republican
Incumbent Senator
Paul Bailey
Republican

District 15 covers much of rural Middle Tennessee, including all of Cumberland, Jackson, Putnam, Smith, Van Buren, and White counties. Communities in the district include Cookeville, Crossville, Sparta, Fairfield Glade, Lake Tansi Village, Algood, Monterey, and Gainesboro.

=== Republican primary ===
==== Presumptive nominee ====
- Paul Bailey, incumbent senator

==== Results ====
2026 Tennessee Senate election, 15th district (Republican primary)
Party	Candidate	Votes	%
Republican	Paul Bailey (incumbent)		

== District 17 ==
District 17 election
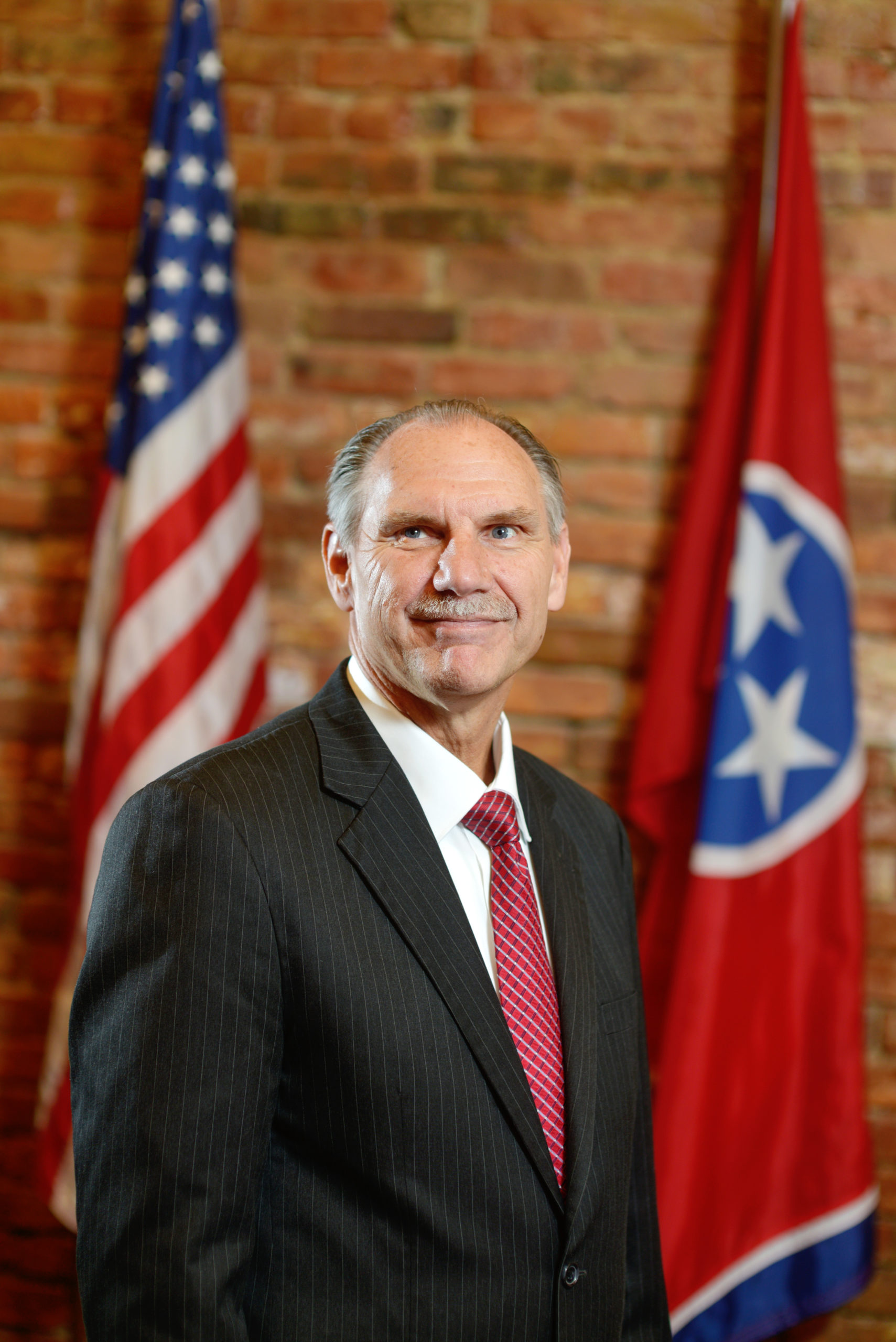

Nominee	Mark Pody	Lindsey Patrick-Wright
Party	Republican	Democratic
Incumbent Senator
Mark Pody
Republican

District 17 covers rural and suburban and urban Middle Tennessee. It covers all of Wilson and the eastern part of Davidson County. Communities in the district includes Mount Juliet, Lebanon, Green Hill and part of Nashville. The Nashville International Airport is mostly located within the district.

=== Republican primary ===
==== Candidates ====
===== Declared =====
- Theodore "Butch" Baker
- Mark Pody, incumbent senator

==== Results ====
2026 Tennessee Senate election, 17th district (Republican primary)
Party	Candidate	Votes	%
Republican	Mark Pody (incumbent)	15,311	67.6
Republican	Theodore "Butch" Baker	7,345	32.4

=== Democratic primary ===
==== Candidates ====
===== Declared =====
- Joni Cochran, nominee for state representative from the 46th district in 2024
- Lindsey Patrick-Wright, librarian

==== Results ====
2026 Tennessee Senate election, 17th district (Democratic primary)
Party	Candidate	Votes	%
Democratic	Lindsey Patrick-Wright	7,236	56.6
Democratic	Joni Cochran	5,543	43.4

== District 19 ==
District 19 election
Nominee	Charlane Oliver (presumptive)
Party	Democratic
Incumbent Senator
Charlane Oliver
Democratic

District 19 is based in downtown Nashville, covering some or all of North Nashville, Antioch, East Nashville, Madison, and Goodlettsville. The district, located in Davidson County, is the only majority-Black Senate district in the state outside of Memphis. A small part of the Nashville International Airport is located in this district.

=== Democratic primary ===
==== Presumptive nominee ====
- Charlane Oliver, incumbent senator

==== Results ====
2026 Tennessee Senate election, 19th district (Democratic primary)
Party	Candidate	Votes	%
Democratic	Charlane Oliver (incumbent)		

== District 21 ==
District 21 election
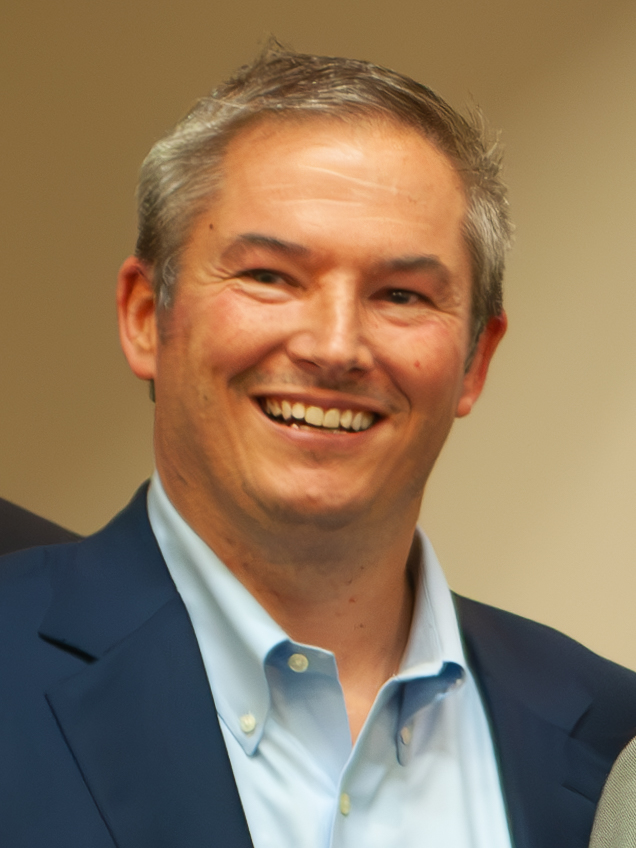
Nominee	Jeff Yarbro (presumptive)
Party	Democratic
Incumbent Senator
Jeff Yarbro
Democratic

District 21 is a convoluted district covering much of central Nashville and its inner suburbs in Davidson County, snaking its way from the Nations and Sylvan Park, down to Berry Hill and Grassmere, eastwards to the border of La Vergne. Vanderbilt University is located within the district.

=== Democratic primary ===
==== Presumptive nominee ====
- Jeff Yarbro, incumbent senator

==== Results ====
2026 Tennessee Senate election, 21st district (Democratic primary)
Party	Candidate	Votes	%
Democratic	Jeff Yarbro (incumbent)		

== District 23 ==
District 23 election
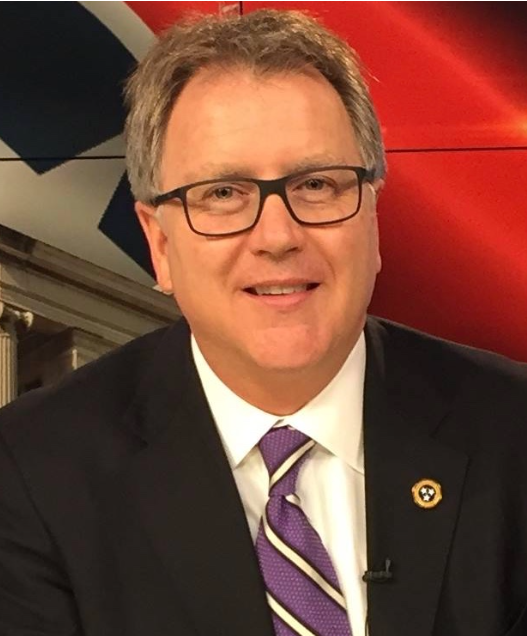

Nominee	Kerry Roberts (presumptive)	David Lee Marcum
Party	Republican	Independent
Incumbent Senator
Kerry Roberts
Republican

District 23 is based in the rural and suburban areas to the west of Nashville, covering all of Cheatham, Dickson, Hickman, Humphreys, Robertson counties, and part of Montgomery County. Communities in the district include Springfield, Dickson, Ashland City, Waverly, Greenbrier, Coopertown, Centerville, Pleasant View, White Bluff, and parts of White House, Portland, and Millersville.

=== Republican primary ===
==== Presumptive nominee ====
- Kerry Roberts, incumbent senator

==== Results ====
2026 Tennessee Senate election, 23rd district (Republican primary)
Party	Candidate	Votes	%
Republican	Kerry Roberts (incumbent)		

=== General election ===
==== Independent candidates ====
- David Lee Marcum

==== Results ====
2026 Tennessee Senate election, 23rd district
Party	Candidate	Votes	%
Independent	David Lee Marcum		
Write-in			

== District 25 ==
District 25 election
Nominee	Ed Jackson (presumptive)
Party	Republican
Incumbent Senator
Kerry Roberts
Republican

District 25 spans the state's border along the Mississippi River, also stretching inland to cover the city of Jackson. The district covers all of Crockett, Dyer, Lake, Madison, Henderson, Decatur, and Perry counties; other communities within the district include Dyersburg, Tiptonville, Newbern, and Alamo.

=== Republican primary ===
==== Presumptive nominee ====
- Ed Jackson, incumbent senator

==== Results ====
2026 Tennessee Senate election, 25th district (Republican primary)
Party	Candidate	Votes	%
Republican	Ed Jackson (incumbent)		

== District 27 ==
District 27 election
Nominee	Jack Johnson (presumptive)	David A. Hardy (presumptive)
Party	Republican	Democratic
Incumbent Senator
Jack Johnson
Republican

District 27 covers most of Williamson County in the southern suburbs of Nashville, including the communities of Franklin, Brentwood, Fairview, Nolensville. It also includes most of Thompson's Station and part of Spring Hill.

=== Republican primary ===
==== Presumptive nominee ====
- Jack Johnson, incumbent senator

==== Results ====
2026 Tennessee Senate election, 27th district (Republican primary)
Party	Candidate	Votes	%
Republican	Jack Johnson (incumbent)		

=== Democratic primary ===
==== Presumptive nominee ====
- David A. Hardy

==== Results ====
2026 Tennessee Senate election, 27th district (Democratic primary)
Party	Candidate	Votes	%
Democratic	David A. Hardy		

== District 29 ==
District 29 election
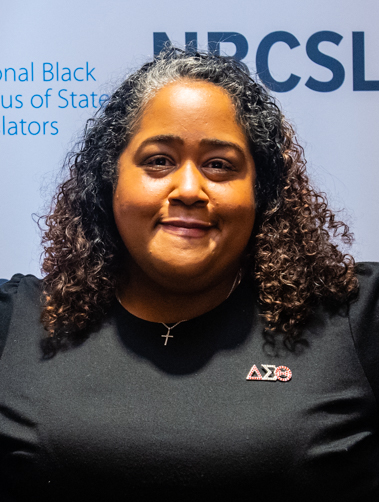
Nominee	Raumesh Akbari (presumptive)
Party	Democratic
Incumbent Senator
Raumesh Akbari
Democratic

District 29 is based in Memphis, following the Mississippi River to cover parts of South and Downtown Memphis, including much of historic Beale Street, as well as Millington and other unincorporated Shelby County suburbs to the north.

=== Democratic primary ===
==== Presumptive nominee ====
- Raumesh Akbari, incumbent senator

==== Results ====
2026 Tennessee Senate election, 29th district (Democratic primary)
Party	Candidate	Votes	%
Democratic	Raumesh Akbari (incumbent)		

== District 31 ==
District 31 election
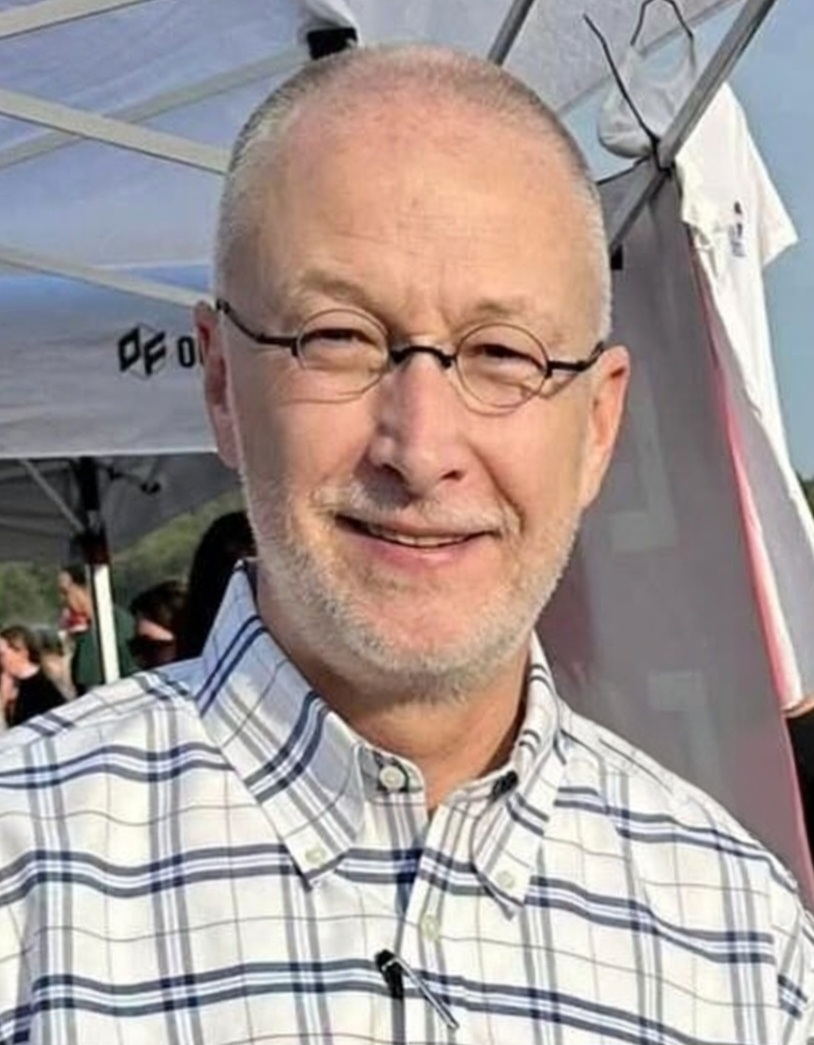

Nominee	Brent Taylor (presumptive)	David Weatherspoon (presumptive)
Party	Republican	Democratic
Incumbent Senator
Brent Taylor
Republican

District 31 covers parts of Memphis and its immediate suburbs to the east, including Germantown and most of Collierville, and some of unincorporated Shelby County.

=== Republican primary ===
==== Presumptive nominee ====
- Brent Taylor, incumbent senator

==== Results ====
2026 Tennessee Senate election, 31st district (Republican primary)
Party	Candidate	Votes	%
Republican	Brent Taylor (incumbent)		

=== Democratic primary ===
==== Presumptive nominee ====
- David Weatherspoon, candidate for this district in 2018

==== Results ====
2026 Tennessee Senate election, 31st district (Democratic primary)
Party	Candidate	Votes	%
Democratic	David Weatherspoon		

== District 33 ==
District 33 election, Democratic primary

Election not contested by any other political party or independent politician.
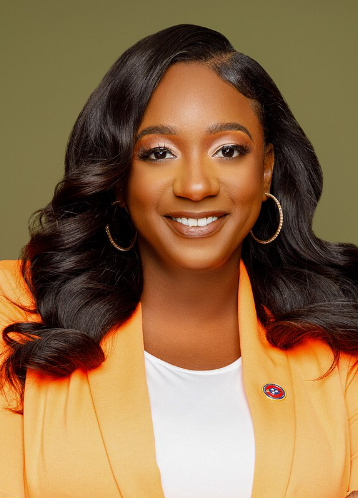

Nominee	London Lamar	Tamika L. Abrum
Party	Democratic	Democratic
Incumbent Senator
London Lamar
Democratic

District 33 is based in South and Southwest Memphis, also covering small parts of Collierville and other Shelby County areas.

=== Democratic primary ===
==== Candidates ====
===== Declared =====
- Tamika L. Abrum
- London Lamar, incumbent senator

==== Results ====
2026 Tennessee Senate election, 33rd district (Democratic primary)
Party	Candidate	Votes	%
Democratic	Tamika L. Abrum		
Democratic	London Lamar (incumbent)		

== See also ==
- 2026 Tennessee elections
- 2026 Tennessee House of Representatives election
- List of Tennessee General Assemblies
