= 2022 Tennessee Senate election =

2022 Tennessee State Senate election
- November 8, 2022

17 of the 33 seats in the Tennessee State Senate 17 seats needed for a majority
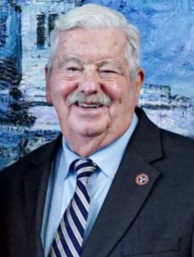

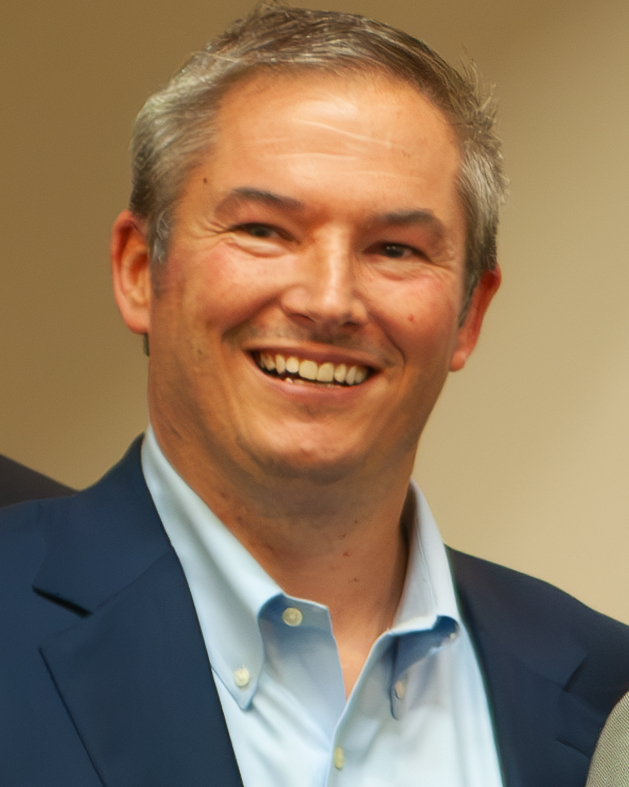
	Majority party	Minority party
Leader	Randy McNally	Jeff Yarbro (resigned as leader)
Party	Republican	Democratic
Leader's seat	5th - Oak Ridge	21st - Nashville
Last election	27 seats	6 seats
Seats before	27	6
Seats won	27	6
Seat change	Steady	Steady
Popular vote	546,264	207,273
Percentage	70.64%	26.81%
Swing	▼0.77%	▲2.38%
- Republican hold Democratic hold No election 60–70% 70–80% 80–90% >90% 70–80% 80–90% >90%
Speaker before election
Randy McNally
Republican
Elected Speaker
Randy McNally
Republican

The 2022 Tennessee State Senate election was held on November 8, 2022, to elect 17 of the 33 seats for the Tennessee's State Senate. The elections coincided with the Governor, U.S. House, and State House elections. The primary elections were held on August 4, 2022.

Following the 2022 elections, no seats changed hands, leaving Tennessee's State Senate delegation at a 27–6 Republican supermajority.

== Redistricting ==
During the 2022 redistricting cycle, the Tennessee State Senate districts were adjusted through a combination of renumbering and boundary changes, some minor and others more significant. While several incumbents were assigned new district numbers, most continued to represent largely the same geographic areas. The plan generally consolidated safe areas and maintained a Republican gerrymander while reducing the number of competitive districts, providing protection to incumbents of both parties.

== Retirements ==
=== Republicans ===
- District 9: Mike Bell retired.
- District 31: Brian Kelsey retired.

=== Democrats ===
- District 19: Brenda Gilmore retired.

== Predictions ==
Source	Ranking	As of
Sabato's Crystal Ball	Safe R	May 19, 2022

== Results summary ==
Summary of the November 8, 2022 Tennessee Senate election results
Party	Candidates	Votes		Seats				
Party	Candidates	No.	%	Before	Up	Won	After	+/–
Republican	15	546,264	70.64	27	13	13	27	Steady
Democratic	10	207,273	26.81	6	4	4	6	Steady
Independent	3	19,716	2.55	0	0	0	0	Steady
Total		773,253	100.00	33	17	17	33	Steady

Popular vote
Republican	70.64%
Democratic	26.81%
Independents	2.55%

Senate seats
Republican	81.82%
Democratic	18.18%

== Overview ==
District	Incumbent			Results	Candidates
District	Senator	Party	Electoral history	Results	Candidates
District 1	Mike Bell; Redistricted from the 9th district	Republican	2010	Incumbent retired. New member elected. Republican hold.	▌ ✓ J. Adam Lowe (Republican); ▌Patricia Waters (Democratic)
District 3	Rusty Crowe	Republican	1990	Incumbent re-elected.	▌ ✓ Rusty Crowe (Republican); ▌Kate Craig (Democratic)
District 5	Randy McNally	Republican	1986	Incumbent re-elected.	▌ ✓ Randy McNally (Republican)
District 7	Richard Briggs	Republican	2014	Incumbent re-elected.	▌ ✓ Richard Briggs (Republican); ▌Bryan Langan (Democratic)
District 9	Steve Southerland; Redistricted from the 1st district	Republican	2002	Incumbent re-elected.	▌ ✓ Steve Southerland (Republican); ▌Sara Thompson (Democratic)
District 11	Bo Watson	Republican	2006	Incumbent re-elected.	▌ ✓ Bo Watson (Republican)
District 13	Dawn White	Republican	2018	Incumbent re-elected.	▌ ✓ Dawn White (Republican); ▌Kelly Northcutt (Democratic)
District 15	Paul Bailey	Republican	2014	Incumbent re-elected.	▌ ✓ Paul Bailey (Republican)
District 17	Mark Pody	Republican	2018	Incumbent re-elected.	▌ ✓ Mark Pody (Republican)
District 19	Brenda Gilmore	Democratic	2018	Incumbent retired. New member elected. Democratic hold.	▌ ✓ Charlane Oliver (Democratic); ▌Pime Hernandez (Republican)
District 21	Jeff Yarbro	Democratic	2014	Incumbent re-elected.	▌ ✓ Jeff Yarbro (Democratic); ▌Rueben Dockery (Independent)
District 23	Kerry Roberts; Redistricted from the 25th district	Republican	2015	Incumbent re-elected.	▌ ✓ Kerry Roberts (Republican)
District 25	Ed Jackson; Redistricted from the 27th district	Republican	2014	Incumbent re-elected.	▌ ✓ Ed Jackson (Republican); ▌Ronnie Henley (Independent)
District 27	Jack Johnson; Redistricted from the 23rd district	Republican	2006	Incumbent re-elected.	▌ ✓ Jack Johnson (Republican)
District 29	Raumesh Akbari	Democratic	2018	Incumbent re-elected.	▌ ✓ Raumesh Akbari (Democratic)
District 31	Brian Kelsey	Republican	2008	Incumbent retired. New member elected. Republican hold.	▌ ✓ Brent Taylor (Republican); ▌Ruby Powell-Dennis (Democratic)
District 33	London Lamar	Democratic	2022 (Appointed)	Incumbent re-elected.	▌ ✓ London Lamar (Democratic); ▌Frederick D. Tappan (Republican); ▌Hastina D. Robinson (Independent)

== District 1 ==
2022 Tennessee's 1st Senate district election
- November 8, 2022
Nominee	Adam Lowe	Patricia Waters
Party	Republican	Democratic
Popular vote	38,381	7,828
Percentage	83.06%	16.94%
- County results Lowe: 80–90%
Senator before election
Mike Bell
Republican
Elected Senator
Adam Lowe
Republican

District 1 covers much of rural East Tennessee bordering Hamilton County and Georgia. The district includes all of Rhea, Meigs, and McMinn Counties and part of Bradley County. Communities in the district include Dayton, Decatur, Athens, and Cleveland.

Incumbent Republican Mike Bell was redistricted from the 9th district, where he won with 77.7% of the vote against Democrat Carl Lansden in 2018. Bell announced his retirement from the Senate. Republican Adam Lowe won the general election, succeeding Bell.

=== Democratic primary ===
==== Candidates ====
===== Declared =====
- Patricia Waters

Democratic primary
Party	Candidate	Votes	%
Democratic	Patricia Waters	2,005	100.00%
Total votes		2,005	100.00%

=== Republican primary ===
==== Candidates ====
- Mark Hall, member of the Tennessee House of Representatives for the 24th district
- J. Adam Lowe, conservative talk radio host, candidate for Tennessee Senate in 2014, candidate for Tennessee House of Representatives in 2014, Vice Chairman of the Bradley County Commission

Declined

- Mike Bell, incumbent senator

Republican primary
Party	Candidate	Votes	%
Republican	J. Adam Lowe	9,551	52.75%
Republican	Mark Hall	8,554	47.24%
Total votes		18,105	100.00%

Results by county Lowe: 50-60%; Hall: 50-60%

=== General election ===
Tennessee's 1st State Senate District general election, 2022
Party	Candidate	Votes	%
Republican	J. Adam Lowe	38,381	83.06%
Democratic	Patricia Waters	7,828	16.94%
Total votes		46,209	100.00%

== District 3 ==
2022 Tennessee's 3rd Senate district election
- November 8, 2022
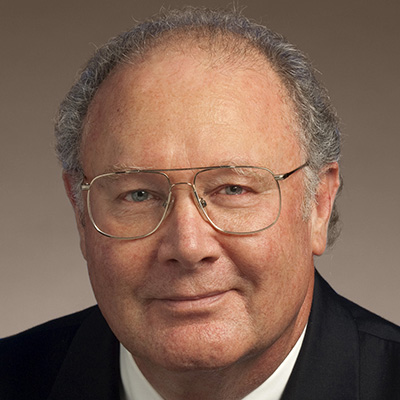

Nominee	Rusty Crowe	Kate Craig
Party	Republican	Democratic
Popular vote	39,237	13,099
Percentage	74.97%	25.03%
- County results Crowe: 70–80% 80–90%
Senator before election
Rusty Crowe
Republican
Elected Senator
Rusty Crowe
Republican

District 3 is based in Johnson City, the southernmost Tri-Cities, covering all of Johnson, Washington, and Carter County. Other communities in the district include Elizabethton, Jonesborough, Erwin, Oak Grove, and Unicoi.

Incumbent Republican Rusty Crowe was re-elected with 100% of the vote in 2018 with no opposition. He ran for re-election and won.

=== Democratic primary ===
==== Candidates ====
- Kate Craig, First Congressional District Chair for the Tennessee Democratic County Chairs Association, former chair of the Washington County Democratic Party (May 2017 – May 2021), and former candidate for Chair of the Tennessee Democratic Party

Democratic primary
Party	Candidate	Votes	%
Democratic	Kate Craig	2,479	100.00%
Total votes		2,479	100.00%

=== Republican primary ===
==== Candidates ====
- Rusty Crowe, incumbent senator (1990–present)

Republican primary
Party	Candidate	Votes	%
Republican	Rusty Crowe	16,039	100.00%
Total votes		16,039	100.00%

=== General election ===
Tennessee's 3rd State Senate District general election, 2022
Party	Candidate	Votes	%
Republican	Rusty Crowe	39,237	74.98%
Democratic	Kate Craig	13,099	25.02%
Total votes		52,336	100.00%

== District 5 ==
2022 Tennessee's 5th Senate district election
- November 8, 2022
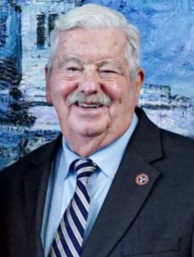
Nominee	Randy McNally
Party	Republican
Popular vote	43,402
Percentage	99.99%
- County results McNally: >90%
Senator before election
Randy McNally
Republican
Elected Senator
Randy McNally
Republican

District 5 covers all of Anderson and Loudon Counties and part of Knox County in the Knoxville metropolitan area, including some of Knoxville proper as well as the surrounding communities of Clinton, Lenoir City, Loudon, Tellico Village, Oliver Springs, and northern Oak Ridge.

Incumbent Republican Tennessee Lieutenant Governor Randy McNally was re-elected with 71.8% of the vote in 2018. He ran for re-election and won.

=== Republican primary ===
==== Candidates ====
- Randy McNally, incumbent senator
- Earle Segrest

Republican primary
Party	Candidate	Votes	%
Republican	Randy McNally	12,965	83.73%
Republican	Earle Segrest	2,520	16.27%
Total votes		15,485	100.00%

=== General election ===
Tennessee's 5th State Senate District general election, 2022
Party	Candidate	Votes	%
Republican	Randy McNally (incumbent)	43,402	99.99%
Independent	Hannah Parton (write-in)	6	0.01%
Total votes		43,408	100.0%
Republican hold			

== District 7 ==
2022 Tennessee's 7th Senate district election
- November 8, 2022
Nominee	Richard Briggs	Bryan Langan
Party	Republican	Democratic
Popular vote	32,925	19,894
Percentage	62.34%	37.66%
- Precinct results Briggs: 50–60% 60–70% 70–80% 80–90% Langan: 50–60% 60–70% 70–80% 80–90%
Senator before election
Rusty Crowe
Republican
Elected Senator
Rusty Crowe
Republican

District 7 covers swath of Knox County, including parts of downtown Knoxville as well as nearby suburbs such as Farragut.

Incumbent Republican Richard Briggs was re-elected with 55.6% of the vote in 2018. He is ran for re-election and won.

=== Democratic primary ===
==== Candidates ====
- Bryan Langan

Democratic primary
Party	Candidate	Votes	%
Democratic	Bryan Langan	7,395	100.0%
Total votes		7,395	100.0%

=== Republican primary ===
==== Candidates ====
- Richard Briggs, incumbent senator (2015–present)
- Kent A. Morrell

Republican primary
Party	Candidate	Votes	%
Republican	Richard Briggs	8,575	66.1%
Republican	Kent A. Morrell	4,395	33.9%
Total votes		12,970	100.0%

=== General election ===
Tennessee's 7th State Senate District general election, 2022
Party	Candidate	Votes	%
Republican	Richard Briggs	32,925	62.34%
Democratic	Brian Langan	19,894	37.66%
Total votes		52,795	100.00%

== District 9 ==
2022 Tennessee's 9th Senate district election
- November 8, 2022
Nominee	Steve Southerland	Sara Thompson
Party	Republican	Democratic
Popular vote	39,113	8,061
Percentage	82.91%	17.09%
- County results Southerland: 80–90%
Senator before election
Steve Southerland
Republican
Elected Senator
Steve Southerland
Republican

District 9 is located to the northeast of Knoxville, and stretches to areas outside of the Tri-Cities region. It includes parts of the Morristown Metropolitan Area. It covers Sevier, Greene, Hamblen, Cocke, and Unicoi counties. Some notable cities in the district include Morristown, Newport, Gatlinburg, and Greeneville.

Incumbent Republican Steve Southerland was redistricted from the 1st district to the 9th district, where he won unopposed with 100% of the vote. He ran for re-election and won.

=== Republican primary ===
==== Candidates ====
- Steve Southerland, incumbent senator

Republican primary
Party	Candidate	Votes	%
Republican	Steve Southerland (incumbent)	13,532	100.0%
Total votes		13,532	100.0%

=== Democratic primary ===
==== Candidates ====
- Sara Thompson

Democratic primary
Party	Candidate	Votes	%
Democratic	Sara Thompson	1,763	100.0%
Total votes		1,763	100.0%

=== General election ===
Tennessee's 9th State Senate District general election, 2022
Party	Candidate	Votes	%
Republican	Steve Southerland (incumbent)	39,113	82.91%
Democratic	Sara Thompson	19,894	17.09%
Total votes		47,174	100.00%

== District 11 ==
2022 Tennessee's 11th Senate district election
- November 8, 2022
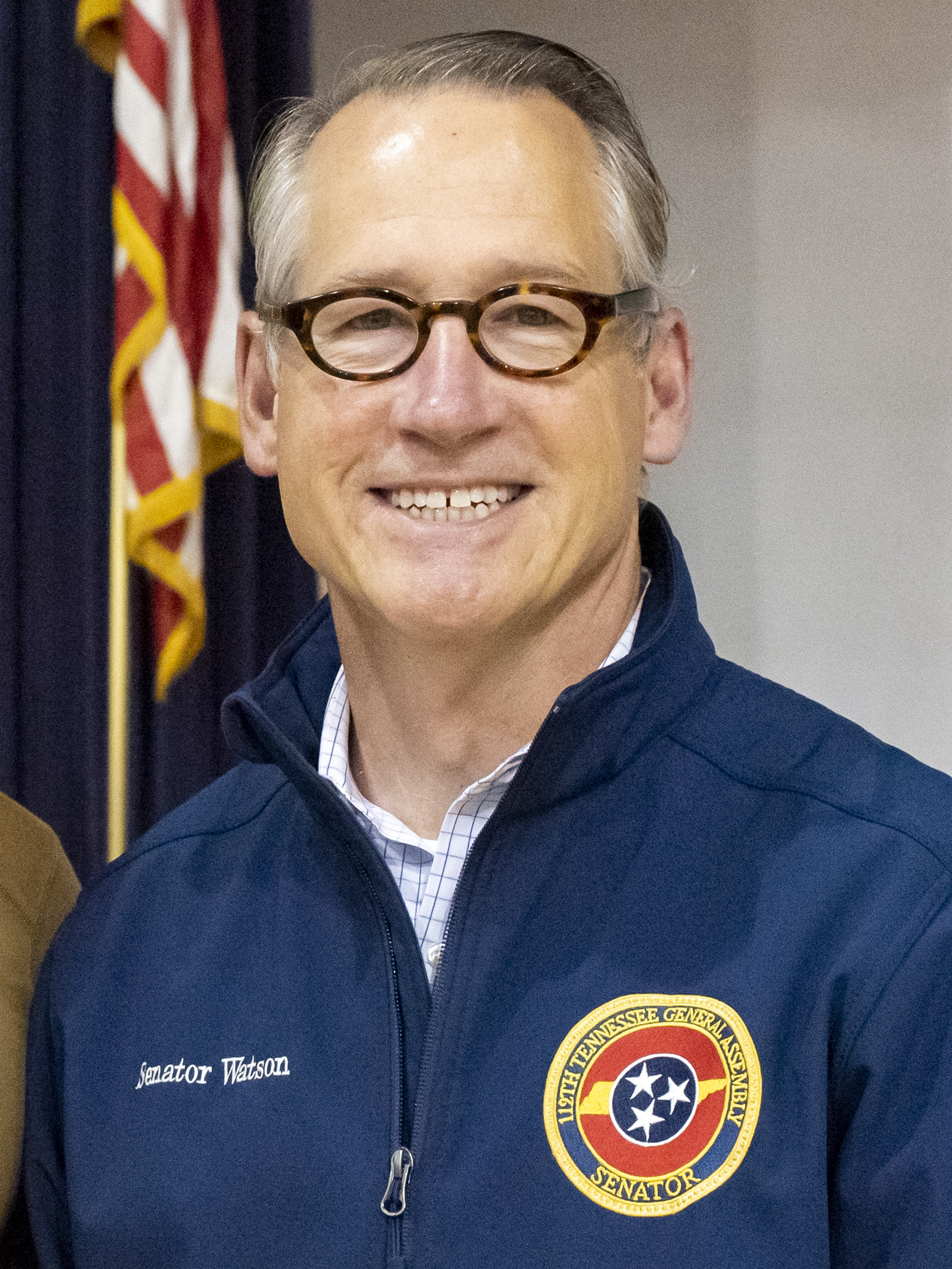
Nominee	Bo Watson
Party	Republican
Popular vote	43,402
Percentage	100.00%
- Precinct results Watson: >90%
Senator before election
Bo Watson
Republican
Elected Senator
Bo Watson
Republican

District 11 is based in the northern suburbs of Chattanooga in Hamilton County, including some of the city proper as well as Soddy-Daisy, Middle Valley, Signal Mountain, Harrison, and part of Collegedale and Red Bank.

Incumbent Republican Bo Watson was re-elected with 65.14% of the vote in 2018. He ran re-election and won.

=== Republican primary ===
==== Candidates ====
- Bo Watson, incumbent senator

Republican primary
Party	Candidate	Votes	%
Republican	Bo Watson (incumbent)	13,532	100.00%
Total votes		13,532	100.00%

=== General election ===
Tennessee's 11th State Senate District general election, 2022
Party	Candidate	Votes	%
Republican	Bo Watson (incumbent)	45,593	100.00%
Total votes		45,593	100.00%
Republican hold			

== District 13 ==
2022 Tennessee's 13th Senate district election
- November 8, 2022
Nominee	Dawn White	Kelly Northcutt
Party	Republican	Democratic
Popular vote	31,936	17,427
Percentage	64.70%	35.30%
- Precinct results White: 50–60% 60–70% 70–80%
Senator before election
Dawn White
Republican
Elected Senator
Dawn White
Republican

District 13 is based in Murfreesboro, including most of the city proper and part of Smyrna and western Rutherford County.

Incumbent Republican Dawn White was re-elected with 57.07% of the vote in 2018. She ran for re-election and won.

=== Republican primary ===
==== Candidates ====
- Dawn White, incumbent senator

Republican primary
Party	Candidate	Votes	%
Republican	Dawn White (incumbent)	11,081	100.00%
Total votes		11,081	100.00%

=== Democratic primary ===
==== Candidates ====
- Kelly Northcutt

Democratic primary
Party	Candidate	Votes	%
Democratic	Kelly Northcutt	5,151	100.00%
Total votes		5,151	100.00%

=== General election ===
Tennessee's 13th State Senate District general election, 2022
Party	Candidate	Votes	%
Republican	Dawn White (incumbent)	31,936	64.70%
Democratic	Kelly Northcutt	17,427	35.30%
Total votes		49,363	100.00%

== District 15 ==
2022 Tennessee's 15th Senate district election
- November 8, 2022
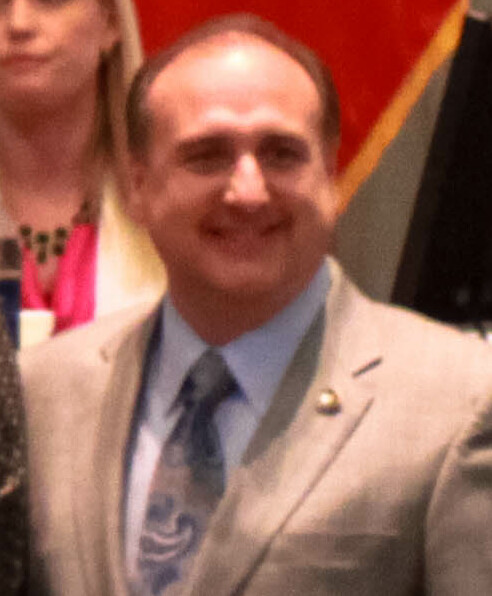
Nominee	Paul Bailey
Party	Republican
Popular vote	45,978
Percentage	100.00%
- County results Bailey: >90%
Senator before election
Paul Bailey
Republican
Elected Senator
Paul Bailey
Republican

District 15 covers much of rural Middle Tennessee, including all of Cumberland, Jackson, Putnam, Smith, Van Buren, and White Counties. Communities in the district include Cookeville, Crossville, Sparta, Fairfield Glade, Lake Tansi Village, Algood, Monterey, and Gainesboro.

Incumbent Republican Paul Bailey was re-elected with 73.64% of the vote in 2018. He ran for re-election and won.

=== Republican primary ===
- Paul Bailey, incumbent senator

Republican primary
Party	Candidate	Votes	%
Republican	Paul Bailey (incumbent)	20,785	100.00%
Total votes		20,785	100.00%

=== General election ===
Tennessee's 15th State Senate District general election, 2022
Party	Candidate	Votes	%
Republican	Paul Bailey (incumbent)	45,978	100.00%
Total votes		45,978	100.00%
Republican hold			

== District 17 ==
2022 Tennessee's 17th Senate district election
- November 8, 2022
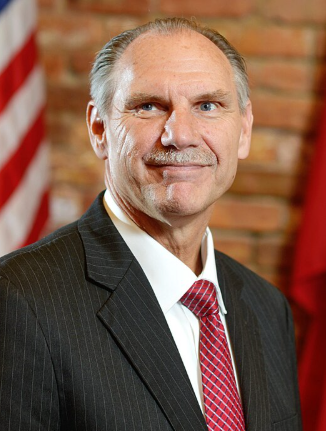
Nominee	Mark Pody
Party	Republican
Popular vote	39,381
Percentage	100.00%
- County results Pody: >90%
Senator before election
Mark Pody
Republican
Elected Senator
Mark Pody
Republican

District 17 covers rural and suburban and urban Middle Tennessee. It covers all of Wilson and the eastern part of Davidson County. Communities in the district includes Mount Juliet, Lebanon, Green Hill and part of Nashville.

During the 2022 redistricting cycle, Tennessee’s Republican-controlled Legislature enacted new state legislative maps that extended District 17 into Davidson County, including areas such as the Nashville International Airport. Civil rights groups criticized the change as diluting minority and Democratic voting strength, though courts later dismissed the related legal challenge.

Incumbent Republican Mark Pody was re-elected with 70.39% of the vote in 2018. He ran for re-election and won unopposed.

=== Republican primary ===
==== Candidates ====
- Mark Pody, incumbent senator

Republican primary
Party	Candidate	Votes	%
Republican	Mark Pody (incumbent)	13,161	100.00%
Total votes		13,161	100.00%

=== General election ===
Tennessee's 17th State Senate District General Election, 2022
Party	Candidate	Votes	%
Republican	Mark Pody (incumbent)	39,381	100.00%
Total votes		39,381	100.00%
Republican hold			

== District 19 ==
2022 Tennessee's 19th Senate district election
- November 8, 2022
Nominee	Charlane Oliver	Pime Hernandez
Party	Democratic	Republican
Popular vote	30,472	6,150
Percentage	83.21%	16.79%
- Precinct results Oliver: 50–60% 60–70% 70–80% 80–90% >90% No data
Senator before election
Brenda Gilmore
Democratic
Elected Senator
Charlane Oliver
Democratic

District 19 is based in downtown Nashville, covering some or all of North Nashville, Antioch, East Nashville, Madison, and Goodlettsville. The district, located in Davidson County, is the only majority-Black Senate district in the state outside of Memphis. A small part of the Nashville International Airport is located in this district.

Incumbent Democrat Brenda Gilmore was re-elected with 85.79% of the vote in 2018. Gilmore announced her retirement from the Senate. Democrat Charlane Oliver won the general election, succeeding Gilmore.

=== Republican primary ===
==== Candidates ====
- Pime Hernandez

Republican primary
Party	Candidate	Votes	%
Republican	Pime Hernandez	1,037	100.00%
Total votes		1,037	100.00%

=== Democratic primary ===
==== Candidates ====
- Barry Barlow
- Jerry Maynard
- Charlane Oliver
- Rossi Turner
- Ludye N. Wallace

==== Declined ====
- Brenda Gilmore, incumbent senator
  Democratic primary
  Party	Candidate	Votes	%
  Democratic	Charlane Oliver	5,801	43.73%
  Democratic	Jerry Maynard	5,152	38.84%
  Democratic	Ludye N. Wallace	1,521	11.47%
  Democratic	Barry Barlow	454	3.42%
  Democratic	Rossi Turner	336	2.53%
  Total votes		13,264	100.00%

=== General election ===
Tennessee's 19th State Senate District general election, 2022
Party	Candidate	Votes	%
Democratic	Charlane Oliver	30,472	83.21%
Republican	Pime Hernandez	6,150	16.79%
Total votes		36,622	100.00%

== District 21 ==
2022 Tennessee's 21st Senate district election
- November 8, 2022
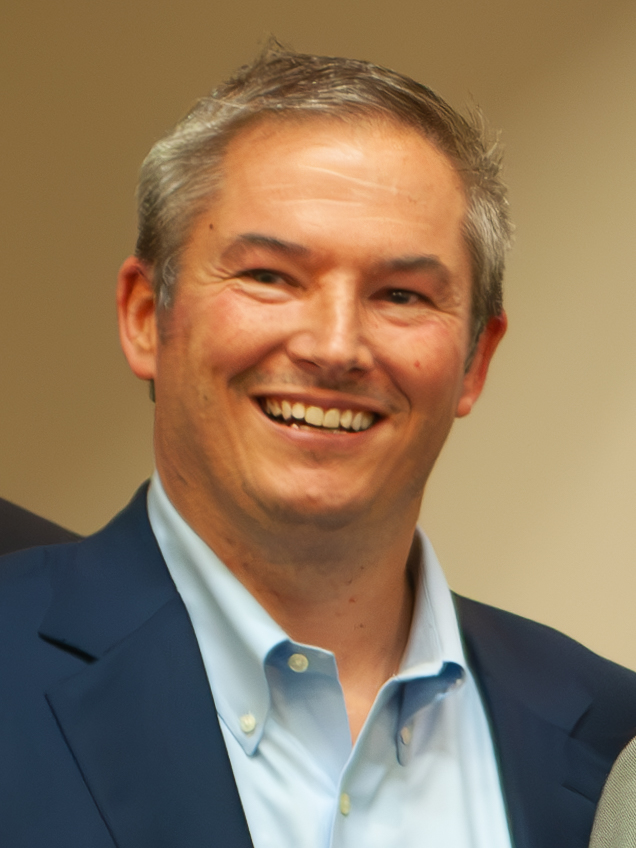

Nominee	Jeff Yarbro	Rueben Dockery
Party	Democratic	Independent
Popular vote	33,061	10,038
Percentage	76.71%	23.29%
- Precinct results Yarbro: 50–60% 60–70% 70–80% 80–90% No data
Senator before election
Jeff Yarbro
Democratic
Elected Senator
Jeff Yarbro
Democratic

District 21 is a convoluted district covering much of central Nashville and its inner suburbs in Davidson County, snaking its way from the Nations and Sylvan Park, down to Berry Hill and Grassmere, eastwards to the border of La Vergne. Vanderbilt University is located within the district.

Incumbent Democratic Jeff Yarbro, was re-elected un-opposed with 100% of the vote in 2018. He is ran for re-election and won.

=== Democratic primary ===
==== Candidates ====
- Jeff Yarbro, incumbent senator

Democratic primary
Party	Candidate	Votes	%
Democratic	Jeff Yarbro (incumbent)	11,496	100.00%
Total votes		11,496	100.00%

=== Independent primary ===
==== Candidates ====
- Rueben Dockery

=== General election ===
Tennessee's 21st State Senate District general election, 2022
Party	Candidate	Votes	%
Democratic	Jeff Yarbro (incumbent)	33,061	76.71%
Independent	Rueben Dockery	10,038	23.29%
Total votes		46,209	100.00%

== District 23 ==
2022 Tennessee's 23rd Senate district election
- November 8, 2022
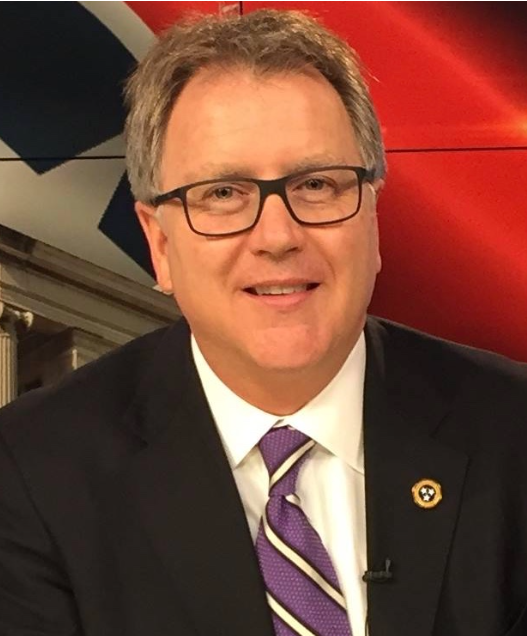
Nominee	Kerry Roberts
Party	Republican
Popular vote	43,126
Percentage	100.00%
- Roberts: >90%
Senator before election
Kerry Roberts
Republican
Elected Senator
Kerry Roberts
Republican

District 23 is based in the rural and suburban areas to the west of Nashville, covering all of Cheatham, Dickson, Hickman, Humphreys, Robertson Counties, and part of Montgomery County. Communities in the district include Springfield, Dickson, Ashland City, Waverly, Greenbrier, Coopertown, Centerville, Pleasant View, White Bluff, and parts of White House, Portland, and Millersville.

Incumbent Republican Kerry Roberts was redistricted from the 25th district, re-elected with 71.52% of the vote in 2018. He ran for re-election and won unopposed.

=== Republican primary ===
==== Candidates ====
- Kerry Roberts, incumbent senator

Republican primary
Party	Candidate	Votes	%
Republican	Kerry Roberts (incumbent)	18,736	100.00%
Total votes		18,736	100.00%

=== General election ===
Tennessee's 23rd State Senate District general election, 2022
Party	Candidate	Votes	%
Republican	Kerry Roberts (incumbent)	43,126	100.00%
Total votes		43,126	100.00%
Republican hold			

== District 25 ==
2022 Tennessee's 25th Senate district election
- November 8, 2022
Nominee	Ed Jackson	Ronnie Henley
Party	Republican	Independent
Popular vote	35,766	9,278
Percentage	79.40%	20.60%
- County results Jackson: 70–80% 80–90%
Senator before election
Ed Jackson
Republican
Elected Senator
Ed Jackson
Republican

District 25 spans the state's border along the Mississippi River, also stretching inland to cover the city of Jackson. The district covers all of Crockett, Dyer, Lake, Madison, Henderson, Decatur, and Perry Counties; other communities within the district include Dyersburg, Tiptonville, Newbern, and Alamo.

Incumbent Republican Ed Jackson was redistricted from the 27th district, re-elected with 65.14% of the vote in 2018. He ran for re-election and won.

=== Republican primary ===
==== Candidates ====
- Ed Jackson, incumbent senator

Republican primary
Party	Candidate	Votes	%
Republican	Ed Jackson (incumbent)	16,039	100.00%
Total votes		16,039	100.00%

=== Independent primary ===
==== Candidates ====
- Ronnie Henley

=== General election ===
Tennessee's 25th State Senate District General Election, 2022
Party	Candidate	Votes	%
Republican	Ed Jackson (incumbent)	35,766	79.40%
Independent	Ronnie Henley	9,278	20.60%
Total votes		45,044	100.0%

== District 27 ==
2022 Tennessee's 27th Senate district election
- November 8, 2022
Nominee	Jack Johnson
Party	Republican
Popular vote	39,381
Percentage	100.00%
- Precinct results Johnson: >90%
Senator before election
Jack Johnson
Republican
Elected Senator
Jack Johnson
Republican

District 27 covers most of Williamson County in the southern suburbs of Nashville, including the communities of Franklin, Brentwood, Fairview, Nolensville. It also includes most of Thompson's Station and part of Spring Hill.

Incumbent Republican Jack Johnson was redistricted from the 23rd district, re-elected with 66.90% of the vote in 2018. He ran for re‑election in 2022 and faced a competitive Republican primary against Gary Humble, a grassroots conservative who criticized Johnson’s record on key issues. Despite being outspent, Humble’s campaign gained traction, making the race close. Johnson narrowly won the primary with 51.6% of the vote and was subsequently re-elected unopposed in the general election.

=== Republican primary ===
==== Candidates ====
- Jack Johnson, incumbent senator
- Gary Humble

Republican primary
Party	Candidate	Votes	%
Republican	Jack Johnson (incumbent)	12,470	51.63%
Republican	Gary Humble	11,684	48.37%
Total votes		24,154	100.00%

=== General election ===
Tennessee's 27th State Senate District general election, 2022
Party	Candidate	Votes	%
Republican	Jack Johnson (incumbent)	55,443	100.00%
Total votes		55,443	100.00%
Republican hold			

== District 29 ==
2022 Tennessee's 29th Senate district election
- November 8, 2022
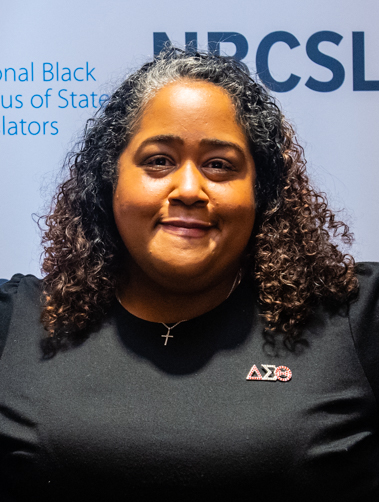
Nominee	Raumesh Akbari
Party	Democratic
Popular vote	30,204
Percentage	100.00%
- Precinct results Akbari: >90%
Senator before election
Raumesh Akbari
Democratic
Elected Senator
Raumesh Akbari
Democratic

District 29 is based in Memphis, following the Mississippi River to cover parts of South and Downtown Memphis – including much of historic Beale Street – as well as Millington and other unincorporated Shelby County suburbs to the north.

Incumbent Democrat Raumesh Akbari was re-elected with 83.48% of the vote in 2018. She ran for re-election and won.

=== Democratic primary ===
==== Candidates ====
- Raumesh Akbari, incumbent senator

Democratic primary
Party	Candidate	Votes	%
Democratic	Raumesh Akbari (incumbent)	21,565	100.00%
Total votes		21,565	100.00%

=== General election ===
Tennessee's 29th State Senate District general election, 2022
Party	Candidate	Votes	%
Democratic	Raumesh Akbari (incumbent)	30,204	100.00%
Total votes		30,204	100.00%

== District 31 ==
2022 Tennessee's 31st Senate district election
- November 8, 2022
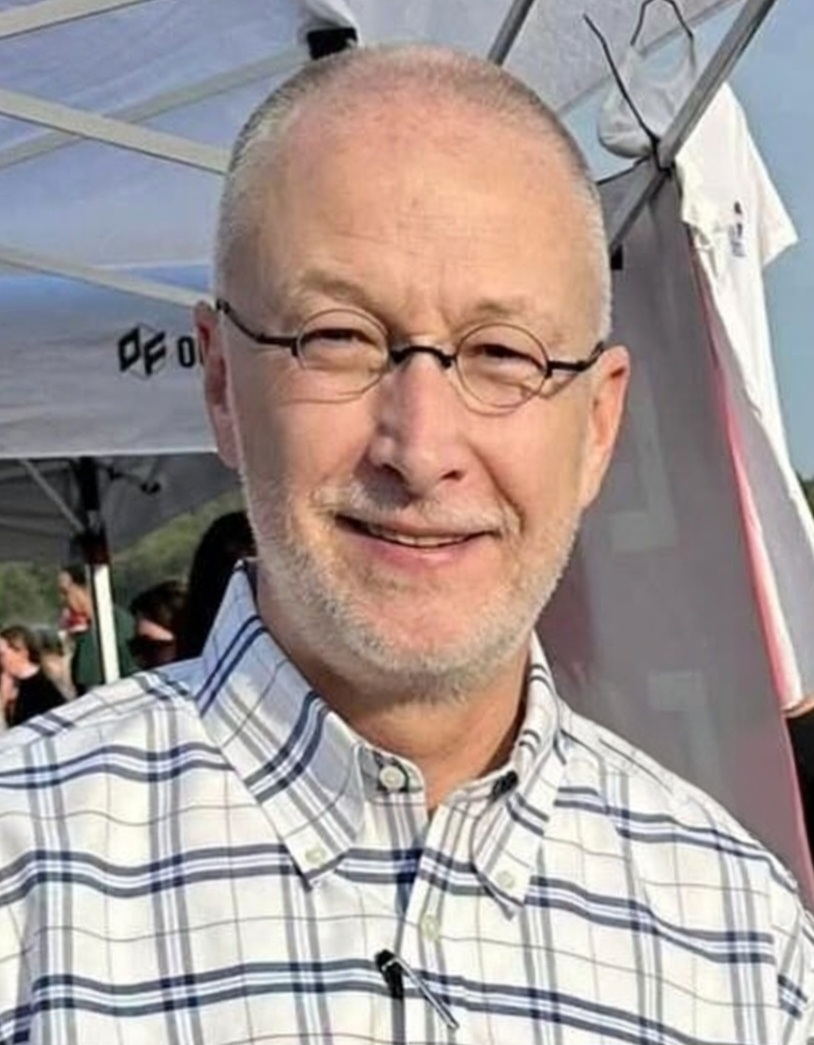

Nominee	Brent Taylor	Ruby Powell-Dennis
Party	Republican	Democratic
Popular vote	45,289	23,041
Percentage	66.28%	33.72%
- Precinct results Taylor: 50–60% 60–70% 70–80% 80–90% Dennis: 50–60% 60–70% 70–80% No data
Senator before election
Brian Kelsey
Republican
Elected Senator
Brent Taylor
Republican

District 31 covers parts of Memphis and its immediate suburbs to the east, including Germantown and most of Collierville, and some of unincorporated Shelby County.

During the 2022 redistricting cycle, Tennessee’s Republican controlled Legislature enacted new state legislative maps that affected Senate District 31. As part of the reconfiguration of Shelby County, District 31 was adjusted to consolidate more Republican voters, effectively creating a Republican stronghold.

Incumbent Republican Brian Kelsey was re-elected with 50.89% of the vote in 2018. Republican Brent Taylor succeeded Kelsey and won the general election with 66.3% of the vote.

=== Republican primary ===
==== Candidates ====
- Brent Taylor

==== Declined ====
- Brian Kelsey, incumbent senator

Republican primary
Party	Candidate	Votes	%
Republican	Brent Taylor	24,854	100.00%
Total votes		24,854	100.00%

=== Democratic primary ===
==== Candidates ====
- Ruby Powell-Dennis

Democratic primary
Party	Candidate	Votes	%
Democratic	Ruby Powell-Dennis	12,207	100.00%
Total votes		12,207	100.00%

=== General election ===
Tennessee's 31st State Senate District general election, 2022
Party	Candidate	Votes	%
Republican	Brent Taylor	45,289	66.28%
Democratic	Ruby Powell-Dennis	23,041	33.72%
Total votes		68,330	100.00%

== District 33 ==
2022 Tennessee's 33rd Senate district election
- November 8, 2022
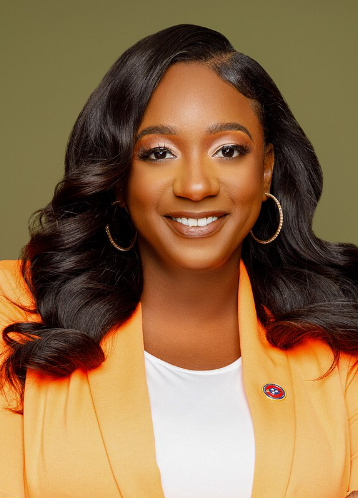

Nominee	London Lamar	Frederick D. Tappan
Party	Democratic	Republican
Popular vote	24,617	5,426
Percentage	80.57%	17.76%
- Precinct results Lamar: 50–60% 60–70% 70–80% 80–90% >90%
Senator before election
London Lamar
Democratic
Elected Senator
London Lamar
Democratic

District 33 is based in South and Southwest Memphis, also covering small parts of Collierville and other Shelby County areas.

Former incumbent Democrat Katrina Robinson was elected with 100.00% of the vote in 2018. In 2022, Robinson was expelled due to her indictment on charges of wire fraud. Democrat London Lamar was appointed to the Tennessee Senate in March 2022 by the Shelby County Commission. Lamar was sworn in on March 8, 2022, and effectively resigned her house seat.

Lamar ran for a full term and won with 80.6% of the vote.

=== Republican primary ===
==== Candidates ====
- Frederick D. Tappan

Republican primary
Party	Candidate	Votes	%
Republican	Frederick D. Tappan	2,589	100.00%
Total votes		2,589	100.00%

=== Democratic primary ===
==== Candidates ====
- Marion Latroy Alexandria-Williams Jr
- Rhonnie Brewer
- London Lamar, incumbent senator

Democratic primary
Party	Candidate	Votes	%
Democratic	London Lamar	12,661	68.54%
Democratic	Marion Latroy Alexandria-Williams Jr	3,166	17.14%
Democratic	Rhonnie Brewer	2,645	14.32%
Total votes		18,472	100.00%

=== Independent primary ===
==== Candidates ====
- Hastina D. Robinson

=== General election ===
Tennessee's 33rd State Senate District general election, 2022
Party	Candidate	Votes	%
Democratic	London Lamar	24,617	80.57%
Republican	Frederick D. Tappan	5,426	17.76%
Independent	Hastina D. Robinson	512	1.68%
Total votes		30,555	100.00%

== See also ==
- 2022 Tennessee elections
- 2022 Tennessee House of Representatives election
