= Douglas S. Jackson =

American politician (born 1954)

Doug Jackson

Member of the Tennessee Senate from the 25th district
- In office 2000–2010
- Preceded by: Kenneth N. "Pete" Springer
- Succeeded by: Jim Summerville

Personal details
- Born: July 10, 1954 (age 72) Dickson, Tennessee
- Party: Democratic
- Spouse: Laura
- Education: Austin Peay State University, Cumberland School of Law (Samford University)
- Profession: Attorney

Douglas S. "Doug" Jackson (born July 10, 1954, in Dickson, Tennessee) is a former Tennessee state senator, and is an attorney, and executive director of the Renaissance Center.

== Early life ==
Jackson is a son of Dr. Jimmy Jackson, a fixture in the Dickson medical community who operated (along with his brothers Lawerence and William) the former Goodlark Medical Center (now HCA-owned Horizon Medical Center). Most of the descendants of these three physicians and brothers entered the medical field, but Doug chose instead the study of law following his graduation from Battle Ground Academy in Franklin, Tennessee and Austin Peay State University in Clarksville, Tennessee. Jackson's legal studies were undertaken at the Cumberland School of Law at Samford University in Birmingham, Alabama, after which he was admitted to the Tennessee bar.

In addition to the regular practice of law, Jackson often assisted his father with regard to legal issues affecting his operation of the hospital and practice of medicine. In 1986, Jackson decided to challenge long-term incumbent Walter "Buck" Work for his seat in the 69th House District of the Tennessee General Assembly.

== State House of Representatives ==
Defeating Work handily in the August Democratic Party primary, Jackson coasted to election in November by a margin of roughly two to one over his Republican opponent in what was at the time still an overwhelmingly Democratic district. After this he never faced a truly well-funded or highly organized campaign against him for the next six two-year terms, never failing to receive less than 57% of the vote in any contest despite the district's increasingly Republican nature.

During this period, Jackson established a fairly conservative voting record, generally being pro-business and always anti-abortion, a position at odds with the national Democratic Party but well in tune with a majority of his constituents. He has stated that his pro-life views grow naturally from his Catholic faith and were not politically motivated or in any way negotiable. It was reported that Jackson was among several Democratic House members approached by the Republican Party after they had gained temporary control of the Tennessee State Senate through party switching to take part in a similar effort in the House but that he declined to do so.

In 1994 and during his House tenure, Jackson survived a very serious bout with cancer, which forced him to miss many legislative meetings. When he reappeared on the House floor, still bald from the effects of chemotherapy and radiation treatments, it was to a protracted standing ovation. As of 2019, Jackson has suffered no recurrence.

== State Senate ==
Following his family's sale of Goodlark Medical Center to HCA, the funds for the proceeds from this sale were placed in a foundation, the Jackson Foundation, which was established for the primary purpose of operating an educational and cultural center on State Route 46 south of Dickson. Jackson was named executive director of the foundation and the center and was reportedly not intending to seek any further terms in the House. However, when 25th District State Senator Kenneth N. "Pete" Springer was found dead in his apartment in early 2000, Jackson's plans suddenly changed. Springer's widow was elected by the Hickman County Commission as an interim replacement; it was correctly assumed that she had little interest in politics and would serve merely as a caretaker with no desire to stand for election in her own right. Jackson soon entered the hotly contested primary for the remaining two years of Springer's term and defeated, among others, Springer's former staff director and campaign manager in August 2000.

The Tennessee Republican Party made a concerted effort to regain the control of the state senate that fall that it had lost when the party switchers mentioned above retired from office, so Jackson was to face a hard-fought campaign for the November election against Decaturville, Tennessee businesswoman Bonnie Butler, whom he defeated by a margin of 55% to 45%.

=== Subsequent elections ===
Jackson was elected to a full term in November 2002 by a larger margin over his Republican opponent, retired Humphreys County educator Jim Brasfield, than he had won over Butler two years previously. Jackson apparently remained quite popular; he won the Democratic nomination for a third (second full) term in the Tennessee Senate on August 3, 2006, with over 80% of the vote. However, he was defeated in the general election by Republican Jim Somerville on November 2, 2010, ending his Senate service.

=== Legislative actions ===
Jackson sponsored a controversial bill "allowing Tennessee's estimated 270,000 handgun-carry permit holders to go armed in restaurants, bars, museums and other establishments licensed to sell alcohol for on-premises consumption (providing that they refrained from consuming themselves while armed)." The Senate voted to override an earlier veto by Tennessee's Governor Phil Bredesen on May 28, 2010. The law took effect on July 1 of that year. Democratic then-Governor Phil Bredesen opposed the "guns bill sponsored by Sen. Doug Jackson, D-Dickson, on the basis that 'guns and alcohol don't mix.'" Despite Jackson's assertion that, "I haven't gotten a complaint from a single citizen that a permit holder made them feel uncomfortable" there was some public outcry and websites started to voice opposition to the law. At the time of its passage, many high-profile law enforcement officers stood in opposition to Jackson's position on the bill. Jackson received public attention in early 2006 as a sponsor of a bill to increase Tennessee's minimum wage to $1.00 an hour above the then-federally required $5.15/hr. Unlike many other states, Tennessee has never had a state minimum wage requirement in excess of the federal rate. This bill faced stiff opposition from business interests which have often supported Jackson in the past, as well as Republican members. Jackson's passed on the floor of the then-Democrat controlled House but failed on the floor of the Republican-controlled senate. The vote broke along party lines.
