= Jim Summerville =

American politician (born 1947)

Member of the Tennessee Senate from the 25th district
- In office January 2011 – January 13, 2015
- Preceded by: Doug Jackson
- Succeeded by: Kerry Roberts

Personal details
- Born: October 27, 1947 (age 79) Dickson, Tennessee, U.S.
- Party: Independent (formerly Republican)
- Profession: College Instructor

James M. Summerville (born October 27, 1947) was a member of the Tennessee Senate from the 25th district, encompassing: Cheatham County, Dickson County, Hickman County, Humphreys County, and Robertson County; and Dickson County, Giles County, Hickman County, Humphreys County, Lawrence County, and Lewis County before the 2012 redistricting. A former Republican he later declared himself an Independent.

== Biography ==
Jim Summerville was born on October 27, 1947, in Dickson, Tennessee. He received a B.A. in Political Science from the University of Tennessee in 1969, an M.A. in English Literature from the University of Iowa in 1972, and an M.A. in American History from Vanderbilt University in 1983. He teaches as an adjunct instructor in the Department of Languages and Literature at Austin Peay State University.

Elected as a Republican, he resigned his membership in the Republican Caucus after losing in a primary in August 2014. In a letter he sent to the Republican Caucus Chairman, Summerville said he would be serving as an independent member of the Senate for the remainder of his term.

He is a member of the National Association of Scholars and the Tennessee Eagle Forum. He attends a Presbyterian church in Dickson.

He is the founder of the Theodore Association Police Award for Nashville and Middle Tennessee.

He supported Rick Perry for Republican primary of the presidential election of 2012.

He was the lead volunteer for the restoration of the Battle of Nashville Monument.

== Arrests ==
In September 2014, Summerville was arrested for public intoxication. The next month, he was arrested for stalking and assault.

== Bibliography ==
- Educating Black Doctors: A History of Meharry Medical College (Alabama, 1983)
- The Carmack-Cooper Shooting: Tennessee Politics Turns Violent (McFarland, 1994)
- Southern Epic: Nashville Through 200 Years (Hallmark, 1996)
- With Kennedy and Other Stories (Xlibris, 1998)
- Nashville Medicine: A History (Association Publishing, 1999)

=== Contributing writer ===
- American National Biography (Oxford, 1999)
- Encyclopedia of Local History (Altamira, 2000)
- Historical Dictionary of the Gilded Age (M.E. Sharpe, 2003)
