= Steve Southerland =

Steve Southerland may refer to:

- Steve Southerland (Tennessee politician) (born 1955), member of the Tennessee House of Representatives
- Steve Southerland (Florida politician) (born 1965), former United States Representative for Florida's 2nd congressional district
