= Tennessee's 23rd Senate district =

American legislative district

Tennessee's 23rd State Senate district
Senator
Kerry Roberts; R–Springfield
- Demographics: 86% White; 4% Black; 5% Hispanic; 1% Asian; 2% Multiracial
- Population (2022): 216,927

Tennessee's 23rd Senate district is one of 33 districts in the Tennessee Senate. It has been represented by Republican Kerry Roberts since 2023. Prior to redistricting, Roberts had represented the 25th district which was located in the same spot as the current 23rd district.

== Geography ==
District 23 is based in the rural and suburban areas to the west of Nashville, covering all of Cheatham, Dickson, Hickman, Humphreys, Robertson Counties, and part of Montgomery County. Communities in the district include Springfield, Dickson, Ashland City, Waverly, Greenbrier, Coopertown, Centerville, Pleasant View, White Bluff, and parts of White House, Portland, and Millersville.

The district is located entirely within Tennessee's 7th congressional district, and overlaps with the 66th, 68th, 69th, 74th, and the 78th districts of the Tennessee House of Representatives. It borders the state of Kentucky.

== Recent election results ==
Tennessee Senators are elected to staggered four-year terms, with odd-numbered districts holding elections in midterm years and even-numbered districts holding elections in presidential years.

=== 2022 ===
Republican primary
Party	Candidate	Votes	%
Republican	Kerry Roberts (incumbent)	18,736	100.00%
Total votes		18,736	100.00%

Tennessee's 23rd State Senate District General Election, 2022
Party	Candidate	Votes	%
Republican	Kerry Roberts (incumbent)	43,126	100.00%
Total votes		43,126	100.00%
Republican hold			

=== 2018 ===
Republican primary
Party	Candidate	Votes	%
Republican	Kerry Roberts (incumbent)	23,909	100.00%
Total votes		23,909	100.00%

Democratic primary
Party	Candidate	Votes	%
Democratic	Wade Munday	9,078	100.00%
Total votes		9,078	100.00%

Tennessee's 25th State Senate District General Election, 2018
Party	Candidate	Votes	%
Republican	Kerry Roberts (incumbent)	47,188	71.52
Democratic	Wade Munday	18,795	28.49
Total votes		65,983	100.00%
Republican hold			

=== 2014 ===
2014 Tennessee Senate election, District 25
Primary election
Party	Candidate	Votes	%
Republican	Kerry Roberts	9,832	42.2
Republican	Joshua Evans	8,819	37.8
Republican	Jim Summerville (incumbent)	3,701	15.9
Republican	Wayne White	968	4.2
Total votes		23,320	100
General election
Republican	Kerry Roberts	29,337	70.4
Democratic	Tony Gross	12,316	29.6
Total votes		41,653	100
Republican hold			

=== Federal and statewide results ===
Year	Office	Results
2020	President	Trump 72.9 – 25.3%
2016	President	Trump 71.4 – 24.9%
2012	President	Romney 64.8 – 33.6%
2012	Senate	Corker 69.7 – 24.9%
