= Bert James (baseball) =

American baseball player (1886–1959)

- Outfielder
- Born: July 7, 1886; Coopertown, Tennessee, U.S.
- Died: January 2, 1959 (aged 72); Adairville, Kentucky, U.S.
- Batted: Left Threw: Right

MLB debut
- September 18, 1909, for the St. Louis Cardinals

Last MLB appearance
- September 23, 1909, for the St. Louis Cardinals

MLB statistics
- Batting average: .286
- Home runs: 0
- Runs batted in: 0
- Stats at Baseball Reference

Teams
- St. Louis Cardinals (1909)

Berton Hulon James (July 17, 1886 – January 2, 1959) was an American outfielder in Major League Baseball. Nicknamed "Jesse", he played in six games for the St. Louis Cardinals in September, 1909 and had 6 hits in 21 at-bats. He played in the minor leagues through 1919, primarily in the Texas League.
