= Kerry Roberts =

American politician (born 1961)

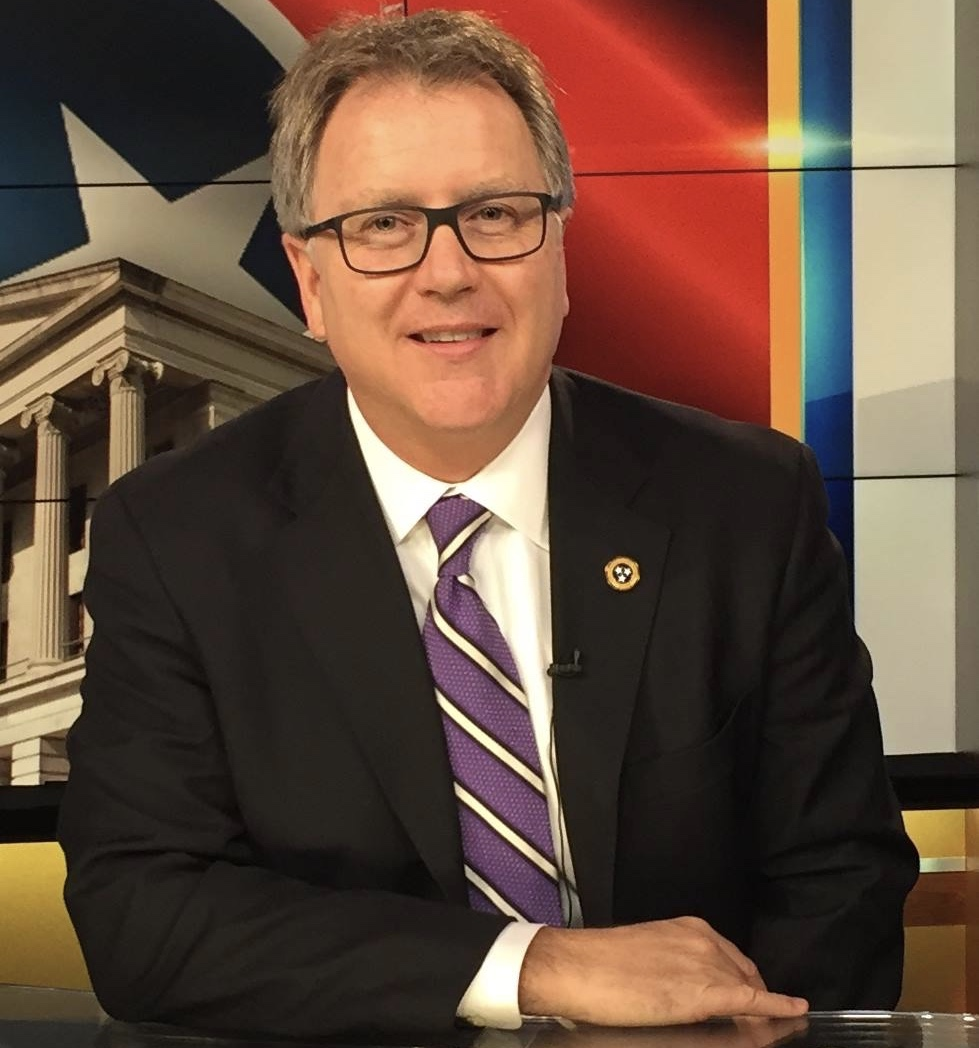
- Roberts in 2017

Member of the Tennessee Senate
- Incumbent
- Assumed office January 13, 2015
- Preceded by: Jim Summerville
- Constituency: 25th district (2015–2023); 23rd district (2023–present)
- In office March 8, 2011 – January 8, 2013
- Preceded by: Ferrell Haile
- Succeeded by: Ferrell Haile
- Constituency: 18th district

Personal details
- Born: October 9, 1961 (age 65) Bedford, Indiana, U.S.
- Party: Republican
- Spouse: Dianne Roberts
- Children: 3
- Education: Lipscomb University
- Occupation: Certified Public Accountant
- Website: www.kerryroberts.com

Kerry E. Roberts (born October 9, 1961) is a Republican member of the Tennessee Senate for the 23rd district, which includes Robertson County, Dickson County, Cheatham County, Humphreys County, Hickman County, and a small northeastern portion of Montgomery County. In January 2020, Roberts left his weekly radio show on Springfield's WDBL and moved to Nashville's WLAC morning show, "The Tennessee Star Report". In October 2021, Roberts rode his bicycle 100 miles to raise money and awareness for Humphreys County flood victims.

== Personal life ==
Born in Bedford, Indiana, Kerry graduated from Bloomington High School North in 1979 and Lipscomb University in Nashville, Tennessee, with a Bachelor of Science in accounting in 1983.

Roberts has been married to his wife, Dianne, since August 1987. They have three children, all of whom attended public schools. He is a member of the Church of Christ. Roberts lives in Springfield, Tennessee.

Roberts was hospitalized with a brain aneurysm on October 9, 2020. He was ultimately diagnosed with a non-aneurysmal subarachnoid hemorrhage and fully recovered.

== Work history ==
After graduation from Lipscomb University, Roberts worked for Touche Ross and Company (now Deloitte). In 1985, he started his own accounting practice which he sold in 1990.

In 1990, Roberts opened a chain of bicycle stores. Roberts also served as President and Chairman of the National Bicycle Dealers Association. He closed his stores as a result of losses incurred by the 2010 Tennessee floods.

Roberts now owns Resource Network LLC, a company that provides accounting, finance, and technology professionals on a temporary or contract basis.

== Committee assignments ==
Roberts previously served on the Health, Government Operations, and Environment and Tourism Senate committees. He was Secretary of the Health Committee.

In January 2019, Lt. Gov. Randy McNally appointed Roberts to be Chairman of the Senate Committee for Government Operations and reappointed Roberts to the Senate Judiciary Committee.

== Legislative accomplishments ==
Roberts sponsored legislation to create a “supplemental insurance program — commonly called a Katie Beckett waiver — to assist families of children with medically complex needs, regardless of their income.” Started by President Ronald Reagan, Tennessee was the last state to adopt a Katie Beckett waiver.

Roberts sponsored the Fresh Start Act to “ensure that licensing authorities do not deny applications for professional licenses due to prior criminal convictions unless they are directly related to the profession, with the exception of certain felonies.”

== Campaigns ==
=== 2011 special ===
Roberts won the Senate District 18 Republican Primary on January 20, 2011.

Roberts won the Senate District 18 General Election on March 8, 2011.

=== 2012 ===
Roberts did not seek a full term and chose to retire.

=== 2014 ===
Roberts announced his campaign for re-election to the Tennessee Senate on May 15, 2013. On September 24, 2013, Representative Joshua Evans of Greenbrier, TN, announced that he was running against Roberts. Other candidates included Tony Gross, Jim Summerville, and Wayne White. Roberts won the August 7, 2014, Republican primary with 42.16 percent of the vote in a highly-contest primary. Representative Joshua Evans (Greenbrier) came in second with 37.82 percent, followed by incumbent Senator Jim Summerville (Dickson) at 15.87 percent, and businessman Wayne White (Dickson) at 4.15 percent. In the November 4, 2014, general election, Roberts defeated Democratic Party nominee Tony Gross with 70.43 percent of the vote, compared to Gross' 29.57 percent.

=== 2018 ===
In 2018, Roberts ran for re-election to the Tennessee Senate. He was unopposed in the August 2, 2018, Republican primary. On November 6, he won re-election with 47,188 votes. He defeated Democrat Wade Munday who had 18,795 votes.

=== 2022 ===
In 2022, Roberts was redistricted to the 23rd district–which was the same district but renamed–and ran for re-election to the Tennessee Senate. He was unopposed in the August 4, 2022, Republican primary. On November 8, he won re-election also unopposed, with 43,126 votes.

== Controversies ==
=== Higher education ===
In September 2019 on his weekly talk radio show, The Kerry Roberts Show, Roberts made national news when he claimed that higher education should be abolished to limit the "liberal breeding ground." The Tennessee Star Report on Nashville's Talk Radio 98.3 and 1510 WLAC welcomed Roberts to discuss his “hyperbole which was misunderstood by the liberal mainstream media” and incorrectly reported as a policy statement.

Roberts’ website posted “His voting record demonstrates consistent support of higher education including the vote to make Tennessee one of the first states in the nation to provide two years of free college or technical education to high school graduates.”

=== Protestors ===
In August 2020 during a special legislative session, Roberts was surrounded by protestors in Nashville. The Washington Post berated Roberts for complaining. In a response published by Gannett, Roberts said those in the national media missed his point: he was defending the right of the protestors to protest.
