= Ed Jackson (Tennessee politician) =

American politician (born 1948)

- Jackson in 2026

Member of the Tennessee Senate
- Incumbent
- Assumed office January 13, 2015
- Preceded by: Lowe Finney
- Constituency: 27th district (2015-2023); 25th district (2023-present)

Personal details
- Born: July 21, 1948 (age 78) Jackson, Tennessee, U.S.
- Party: Republican
- Spouse: Marilyn Jackson
- Children: 3
- Education: Jackson High School, Memphis State University
- Occupation: Businessman, politician

Ed Jackson (born July 21, 1948) is an American businessman and politician. He serves as a Republican member of the Tennessee Senate for the 25th district.

== Early life ==
Ed Jackson was born on July 21, 1948, in Jackson, Tennessee.

Jackson was educated at the Jackson High School. He attended Lambuth College and graduated from Memphis State University. Jackson was a member of Kappa Sigma fraternity in college.

Jackson served in the 30th Armored Division of the Army National Guard for seven years.

== Career ==
Jackson started his career at the Southern Supply Company, where he worked for seven years. He worked as a salesman for the Tennant Company for three decades. With his wife, he co-owns Southern Comfort Coaches, Snappy Tomato Pizza and Marilyn Jackson's Gifts, three small businesses based in Jackson, Tennessee.

Since 2014, Jackson has served as a Republican member of the Tennessee Senate for District 27, encompassing parts of Madison County, Crockett County, Dyer County, Lake County and Lauderdale County.

Jackson serves on the board of trustees of the West Tennessee Area Council of the Boy Scouts of America. He is a member of the National Rifle Association of America.

== Personal life ==
With his wife Marilyn, he has three children. He is a member of the Church of Christ.
