= Tennessee's 13th Senate district =

American legislative district

Tennessee's 13th State Senate district
Senator
Dawn White; R–Murfreesboro
- Demographics: 71% White; 13% Black; 6% Hispanic; 5% Asian; 5% Multiracial
- Population (2022): 204,203

Tennessee's 13th Senate district is one of 33 districts in the Tennessee Senate. It has been represented by Republican Dawn White since 2018, succeeding fellow Republican Bill Ketron.

== Geography ==
District 13 is based in Murfreesboro, including most of the city proper and part of Smyrna and western Rutherford County.

The district is located entirely within Tennessee's 4th congressional district.

== Recent election results ==
Tennessee Senators are elected to staggered four-year terms, with odd-numbered districts holding elections in midterm years and even-numbered districts holding elections in presidential years.

=== 2022 ===
Republican primary
Party	Candidate	Votes	%
Republican	Dawn White (incumbent)	11,081	100
Total votes		11,081	100

Democratic primary
Party	Candidate	Votes	%
Democratic	Kelly Northcutt	5,151	100
Total votes		5,151	100

Tennessee's 13th State Senate District General Election, 2022
Party	Candidate	Votes	%
Republican	Dawn White	31,936	64.70%
Democratic	Kelly Northcutt	17,427	35.30%
Total votes		49,363	100.00%

=== 2018 ===
2018 Tennessee Senate election, District 13
Primary election
Party	Candidate	Votes	%
Republican	Dawn White	10,639	58.2
Republican	Ernest Burgess	7,635	41.8
Total votes		18,274	100
General election
Republican	Dawn White	36,594	57.1
Democratic	Kelly Northcutt	25,974	40.5
Independent	Ginger Smith	1,559	2.4
Total votes		64,127	100
Republican hold			

=== 2014 ===
2014 Tennessee Senate election, District 13
Party	Candidate	Votes	%
Republican	Bill Ketron (incumbent)	29,489	100
Total votes		29,489	100
Republican hold			

=== Federal and statewide results ===
Year	Office	Results
2020	President	Trump 55.6 – 42.2%
2016	President	Trump 59.7 – 35.2%
2012	President	Romney 61.0 – 37.4%
2012	Senate	Corker 64.9 – 29.8%
