= Tennessee Senate =

Upper house of the Tennessee General Assembly

Coordinates: 36.1658°N 86.7843°W

Senate of Tennessee
- Tennessee General Assembly

Type
- Type: Upper house
- Term limits: None

History
- New session started: January 14, 2025

Leadership
- Speaker: Randy McNally (R) since January 10, 2017
- Speaker pro tempore: Ferrell Haile (R) since January 19, 2018
- Majority Leader: Jack Johnson (R) since January 8, 2019
- Minority Leader: Raumesh Akbari (D) since January 10, 2023

Structure
- Seats: 33
- Political groups: Majority: Republican (27); Minority: Democratic (6)
- Length of term: 4 years
- Authority: Article III, Tennessee Constitution
- Salary: $33,060/year + per diem, employee benefits, travel reimbursement

Elections
- Last election: November 5, 2024 (16 seats)
- Next election: November 3, 2026 (17 seats)
- Redistricting: Legislative Control

Meeting place
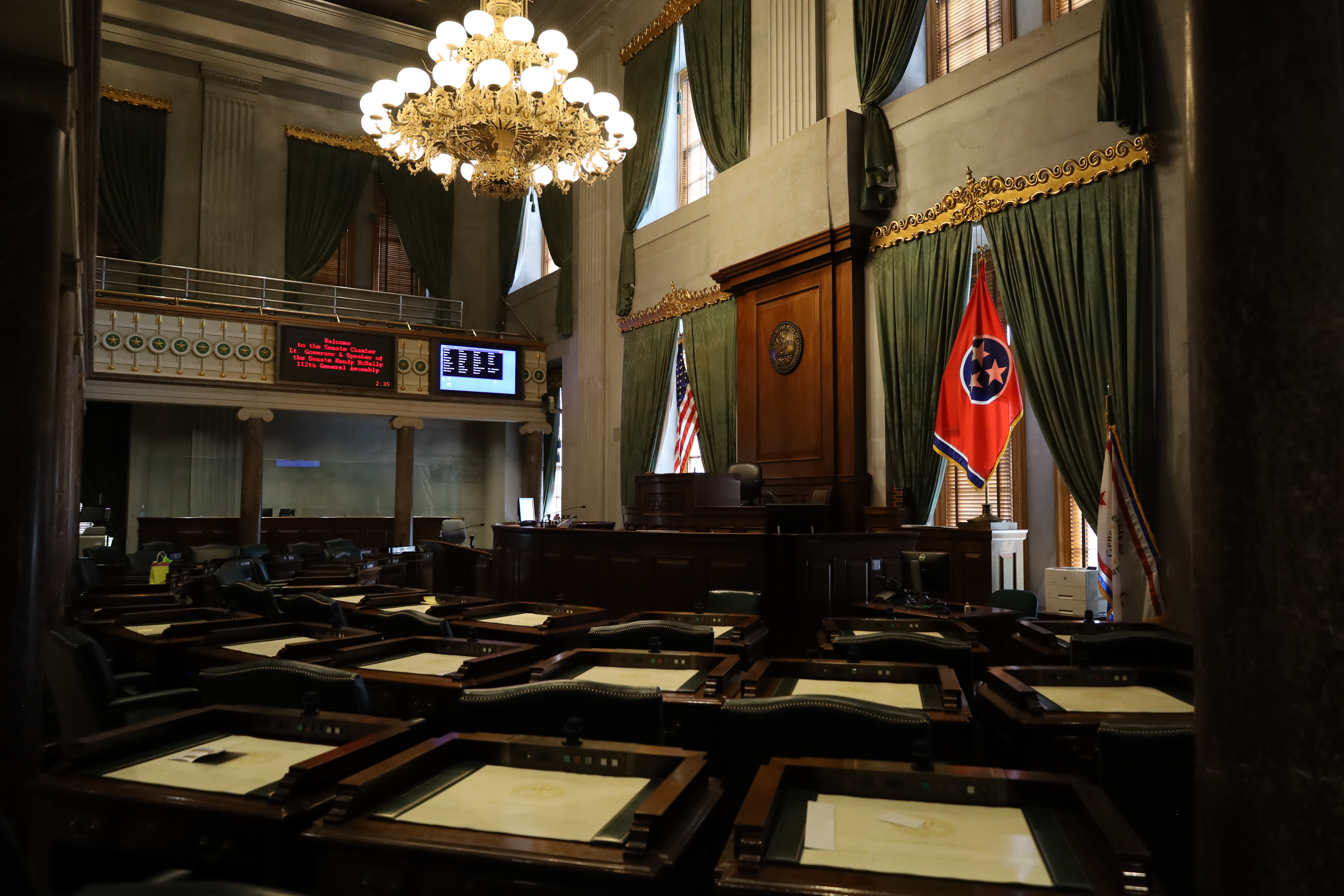
- State Senate Chamber; Tennessee State Capitol; Nashville, Tennessee

Website
- Tennessee Senate

Rules
- Permanent Rules of Order for the 113th General Assembly

The Tennessee Senate is the upper house of the U.S. state of Tennessee's state legislature, which is known formally as the Tennessee General Assembly.

The Tennessee Senate has the power to pass resolutions concerning essentially any issue regarding the state, country, or world. The Senate also has the power to create and enforce its own rules and qualifications for its members. The Senate shares these powers with the Tennessee House of Representatives. The Senate alone has the power to host impeachment proceeding and remove impeached members of office with a 2/3 majority. The Tennessee Senate, according to the state constitution of 1870, is composed of 33 members, one-third the size of the Tennessee House of Representatives. Senators are to be elected from districts of substantially equal population. According to the Tennessee constitution, a county is not to be joined to a portion of another county for purposes of creating a district; this provision has been overridden by the rulings of the Supreme Court of the United States in Baker v. Carr (369 U.S. 182, 1962) and Reynolds v. Sims (337 U.S. 356, 1964). The Tennessee constitution has been amended to allow that if these rulings are ever changed or reversed, a referendum may be held to allow the senate districts to be drawn on a basis other than substantially equal population.

Until 1966, Tennessee state senators served two-year terms. That year the system was changed, by constitutional amendment, to allow four-year terms. In that year, senators in even-numbered districts were elected to two-year terms and those in odd-numbered districts were elected to four-year terms. This created a staggered system in which only half of the senate is up for election at any one time. Senators from even-numbered districts are elected in the same years as presidential elections, and senators from odd-numbered districts are elected in the same years as mid-term elections. Districts are to be sequentially and consecutively numbered; the scheme basically runs from east to west and north to south.

Republicans attained an elected majority in the Senate in the 104th General Assembly (2005–07) for the first time since Reconstruction; a brief majority in the 1990s was the result of two outgoing senators switching parties. Following the 2018 elections, there were no Democratic senators from East Tennessee. There were three Democrats from Memphis in West Tennessee, and three from Middle Tennessee, two from Nashville and one from the Nashville suburb of Goodlettsville.

== Speaker of the Senate ==
According to Article III, Section 12 of the Constitution of the State of Tennessee, the speaker of the Senate assumes the office of governor in the event of a vacancy. The Senate elects one of its own members as speaker and the speaker automatically becomes the lieutenant governor. The speaker appoints a speaker pro tempore who presides over the Senate in the absence of the speaker as well as a deputy speaker to assist the speaker in their duties. The current speaker of the Senate and lieutenant governor is Randy McNally, who was elected to the position in 2017.

One of the main duties of the speaker is to preside over the Senate and make Senate committee appointments based upon ability and preference of members, seniority, and party representation. The speaker also maintains the power to remove members from Committee appointments. The speaker, in cohort with the speaker of the House of Representatives, chairs the Joint Legislative Services Committee which provides assistance to the General Assembly. The speaker also controls staffing and office space with Senate staff. The speaker serves as an ex-officio member of all standing committees.

== Oath and qualifications of office ==
=== Oath of office ===
"I [name of official] do solemnly swear that, as a member of this, the [number, ex. One Hundred Eleventh] General Assembly of the State of Tennessee, I will faithfully support the Constitution of this State and of the United States, and I do solemnly affirm that as a member of this General Assembly, I will, in all appointments, vote without favor, affection, partiality, or prejudice; and that I will not propose or assent to any bill, vote or resolution, which shall appear to me injurious to the people, or consent to any act or thing, whatever, that shall have a tendency to lessen or abridge their rights and privileges, as declared by the Constitution of this state."

=== Qualifications for office ===
"No person shall be a senator unless he shall be a citizen of the United States, of the age of thirty years, and shall have resided three years in this state, and one year in the county or district, immediately preceding the election."

== Composition of the 113th General Assembly (2023-2025) ==
| Affiliation | Party (Shading indicates majority caucus) | | Total | Vacant |
| Affiliation | Republican | Democratic | Total | Vacant |
|---|---|---|---|---|
| End of previous legislature | 27 | 6 | 33 | 0 |
| Beginning of 113th GA | 27 | 6 | 33 | 0 |
| Latest voting share | 81.8% | 18.2% | | |

== Senate leadership and members ==
Senate leaders

- Speaker of the Senate, Lieutenant Governor: Randy McNally
- Speaker pro tempore: Ferrell Haile
- Deputy Speaker: Shane Reeves, John Stevens, Dawn White

| Majority party (R) | Leadership position | Minority party (D) |
|---|---|---|
| Jack Johnson | Leader | Raumesh Akbari |
| Ken Yager | Caucus Chairperson | London Lamar |

== Members ==
| District | Name | Party | Start | Residence | Counties |
|---|---|---|---|---|---|
| 1 | J. Adam Lowe | Rep | 2022 | Calhoun | Meigs, McMinn, Rhea, and part of Bradley |
| 2 | Tom Hatcher | Rep | 2024 | Maryville | Blount, Monroe, Polk, and part of Bradley |
| 3 | Rusty Crowe | Rep | 1990 | Johnson City | Carter, Johnson, and Washington |
| 4 | Bobby Harshbarger | Rep | 2024 | Kingsport | Hawkins, Sullivan |
| 5 | Randy McNally | Rep | 1986 | Oak Ridge | Anderson, Loudon, and part of Knox |
| 6 | Becky Duncan Massey | Rep | 2011 (Note: Originally appointed or elected in a special election.) | Knoxville | Part of Knox |
| 7 | Richard Briggs | Rep | 2014 | Knoxville | Part of Knox |
| 8 | Jessie Seal | Rep | 2024 | New Tazewell | Claiborne, Grainger, Hancock, Jefferson, Union, and part of Sevier |
| 9 | Steve Southerland | Rep | 2002 | Morristown | Cocke, Greene, Hamblen, Unicoi, and part of Sevier |
| 10 | Todd Gardenhire | Rep | 2012 | Chattanooga | Bledsoe, Marion, Sequatchie, and part of Hamilton |
| 11 | Bo Watson | Rep | 2006 | Hixson | Part of Hamilton |
| 12 | Ken Yager | Rep | 2008 | Kingston | Campbell, Clay, Fentress, Macon, Morgan, Overton, Pickett, Roane, and Scott |
| 13 | Dawn White | Rep | 2018 | Murfreesboro | Part of Rutherford |
| 14 | Shane Reeves | Rep | 2017 | Murfreesboro | Bedford, Cannon, Moore, and part of Rutherford |
| 15 | Paul Bailey | Rep | 2014 | Sparta | Cumberland, Jackson, Putnam, Smith, Van Buren, and White |
| 16 | Janice Bowling | Rep | 2012 | Tullahoma | Coffee, DeKalb, Franklin, Grundy, Lincoln, and Warren |
| 17 | Mark Pody | Rep | 2017 | Lebanon | Wilson and part of Davidson |
| 18 | Ferrell Haile | Rep | 2012 | Gallatin | Sumner, and Trousdale |
| 19 | Charlane Oliver | Dem | 2022 | Nashville | Part of Davidson |
| 20 | Heidi Campbell | Dem | 2020 | Nashville | Part of Davidson |
| 21 | Jeff Yarbro | Dem | 2014 | Nashville | Part of Davidson |
| 22 | Bill Powers | Rep | 2019 | Clarksville | Part of Montgomery |
| 23 | Kerry Roberts (Note: Roberts previously served in the state senate from 2011–2013.) | Rep | 2014 | Springfield | Cheatham, Dickson, Hickman, Humphreys, Robertson, and part of Montgomery |
| 24 | John Stevens | Rep | 2012 | Huntingdon | Benton, Carroll, Gibson, Henry, Houston, Obion, Stewart, and Weakley |
| 25 | Ed Jackson | Rep | 2014 | Jackson | Crockett, Decatur, Dyer, Henderson, and Lake, Madison, and Perry |
| 26 | Page Walley | Rep | 2020 | Bolivar | Chester, Fayette, Hardeman, Hardin, Haywood, Lawrence, McNairy, and Wayne |
| 27 | Jack Johnson | Rep | 2006 | Franklin | Part of Williamson |
| 28 | Joey Hensley | Rep | 2012 | Hohenwald | Giles, Lewis, Marshall, Maury, and part of Williamson |
| 29 | Raumesh Akbari | Dem | 2018 | Memphis | Part of Shelby |
| 30 | Sara Kyle | Dem | 2014 | Memphis | Part of Shelby |
| 31 | Brent Taylor | Rep | 2022 | Memphis | Part of Shelby |
| 32 | Paul Rose | Rep | 2019 | Covington | Lauderdale, Tipton and part of Shelby |
| 33 | London Lamar | Dem | 2022 | Memphis | Part of Shelby |

== Senate committees ==
The Tennessee State Senate has 12 committees in total: 9 standing committees and 3 select committees. Committee assignments for the 112th General Assembly were announced in the January 12, 2021 organizational session:

Standing committees
| Committee name | Chair | Vice-chair |
|---|---|---|
| Commerce and Labor | Sen. Paul Bailey (R) | 1st Vice Chair: Sen. Art Swann (R) 2nd Vice Chair: Sen. Frank Nicely (R) |
| Education | Sen. Jon Lundberg (R) | 2nd Vice Chair: Sen. Raumesh Akbari (D) |
| Energy, Agriculture, and Natural Resources | Sen. Steve Southerland (R) | 1st Vice Chair: Sen. Frank Niceley (R) 2nd Vice Chair: Sen. Mark Pody (R) |
| Finance, Ways, and Means | Sen. Bo Watson (R) | 1st Vice Chair: Sen. John Stevens (R) 2nd Vice Chair: Sen. Joey Hensley (R) |
| Government Operations | Sen. Kerry Roberts (R) | 1st Vice Chair: Sen. Ed Jackson (R) 2nd Vice Chair: Sen. Janice Bowling (R) |
| Health and Welfare | Sen. Rusty Crowe (R) | 1st Vice Chair: Sen. Ferrell Haile (R) 2nd Vice Chair: Sen. Shane Reeves (R) |
| Judiciary | Vacant | 1st Vice Chair: Sen. Dawn White (R) 2nd Vice Chair: Sen. Paul Rose (R) |
| State and Local Government | Sen. Richard Briggs (R) | 1st Vice Chair: Sen. Todd Gardenhire (R) 2nd Vice Chair: Sen. Page Walley (R) |
| Transportation and Safety | Sen. Becky Duncan Massey (R) | 1st Vice Chair: Sen. Bill Powers (R) 2nd Vice Chair: Sen. Mark Pody (R) |

Select committees
| Committee name | Chair | Vice-chair |
|---|---|---|
| Calendar | Sen. Ed Jackson (R) | 1st Vice Chair: Sen. Jack Johnson (R) 2nd Vice Chair: Sen. Jeff Yarbro (D) |
| Ethics | Sen. Ferrell Haile (R) | 1st Vice Chair: Sen. John Stevens (R) |
| Rules | Sen. Bo Watson (R) | 1st Vice Chair: Sen. Richard Briggs (R) |

== Past composition of the Senate ==
In 1921, Anna Lee Keys Worley became the first woman to serve in the Tennessee Senate.

== See also ==
- List of Tennessee General Assemblies
