= Tennessee's 21st Senate district =

American legislative district

Tennessee's 21st State Senate district
Senator
Jeff Yarbro; D–Nashville
- Demographics: 63% White; 13% Black; 15% Hispanic; 6% Asian; 3% Multiracial
- Population (2022): 203,752

Tennessee's 21st Senate district is one of 33 districts in the Tennessee Senate. It has been represented by Democrat Jeff Yarbro, the current Senate Minority Leader, since 2014.

== Geography ==
District 21 is a convoluted district covering much of central Nashville and its inner suburbs in Davidson County, snaking its way from the Nations and Sylvan Park, down to Berry Hill and Grassmere, eastwards to the border of La Vergne. Vanderbilt University is located within the district.

The district is located within Tennessee's 5th, 6th, and 7th congressional districts.

== Recent election results ==
Tennessee Senators are elected to staggered four-year terms, with odd-numbered districts holding elections in midterm years and even-numbered districts holding elections in presidential years.

=== 2018 ===
2018 Tennessee Senate election, District 21
Party	Candidate	Votes	%
Democratic	Jeff Yarbro (incumbent)	55,905	100
Total votes		55,905	100
Democratic hold			

=== 2014 ===
2014 Tennessee Senate election, District 21
Primary election
Party	Candidate	Votes	%
Democratic	Jeff Yarbro	6,830	56.7
Democratic	Mary Mancini	5,217	43.3
Total votes		12,047	100
Republican	Diana Cuellar	2,960	61.3
Republican	Quincy McKnight	1,523	31.5
Republican	Mwafaq Aljabbary	346	7.2
Total votes		4,829	100
General election
Democratic	Jeff Yarbro	25,402	66.6
Republican	Diana Cuellar	12,714	33.4
Total votes		38,116	100
Democratic hold			

=== Federal and statewide results ===
Year	Office	Results
2020	President	Biden 68.8 – 28.0%
2016	President	Clinton 63.9 – 29.9%
2012	President	Obama 61.2 – 36.7%
2012	Senate	Clayton 47.4 – 44.5%
