= J. Adam Lowe =

American politician (born 1981)

Member of the Tennessee House of Representatives from the 1st district
- Incumbent
- Assumed office January 10, 2023
- Preceded by: Steve Southerland (redistricted)

Personal details
- Born: January 8, 1981 (age 45)
- Party: Republican
- Spouse: Rachel Lowe
- Children: 4
- Education: Lee University (BA); University of Tennessee at Chattanooga (MPA); University of Tennessee (PhD)
- Website: Senate website

J. Adam Lowe (born January 8, 1981) is an American Republican politician who serves as the senator for Tennessee's 1st Senate district. The district currently includes most of Bradley, McMinn, Meigs, and Rhea Counties, and was previously numbered as District 9 prior to the 2020 United States redistricting cycle.

== Biography ==
J. Adam Lowe served on the Bradley County Commission for District 3 from 2010 to 2014. In October 2013, Lowe announced his intent to run for Tennessee House of Representatives District 22 after then-incumbent Eric Watson announced his intent to vacate the seat to run for Bradley County Sheriff. He was defeated by Dan Howell, receiving 2,017 votes, or 42.6% of the total. He served as a delegate to the 2016 Republican National Convention.

In January 2022, announced his intent to run for then-State Senate District 9, which was being vacated by Mike Bell. He won the August 4 primary with 53% of the vote, or 9,651 total votes, defeating then-24th District State Representative Mark Hall. He defeated Democrat Patricia Waters in the general election on November 8.

In 2025, Lowe supported Tennessee Governor Bill Lee's universal school voucher plan.

== Personal life ==
Lowe is married to Rachel and has four children. He attended Lee University and the University of Tennessee.
