= Dawn White =

American politician (born 1975)

Member of the Tennessee Senate from the 13th district
- Incumbent
- Assumed office January 8, 2019
- Preceded by: Bill Ketron

Member of the Tennessee House of Representatives from the 37th district
- In office January 8, 2013 – January 8, 2019
- Preceded by: Bill Harmon
- Succeeded by: Charlie Baum

Personal details
- Born: October 22, 1975 (age 50)
- Party: Republican
- Education: Middle Tennessee State University
- Website: votedawn.com

Dawn White (born October 22, 1975) is an American politician and a Republican member of the Tennessee Senate representing the 13th district. She was formerly a member of the Tennessee House of Representatives representing District 37. White was elected to the Tennessee Senate in 2018, filling the seat vacated by Bill Ketron.

== Education ==
White earned her BS in early childhood education and her MEd from Middle Tennessee State University.

== Elections ==
- 2012 When District 37 Democratic Representative Bill Harmon retired and left the seat open, White won the August 2, 2012 Republican Primary with 3,035 votes (73.2%) and won the November 6, 2012 General election with 14,175 votes (63.2%) against Democratic nominee Robert New.
