= London Lamar =

American politician (born 1990)

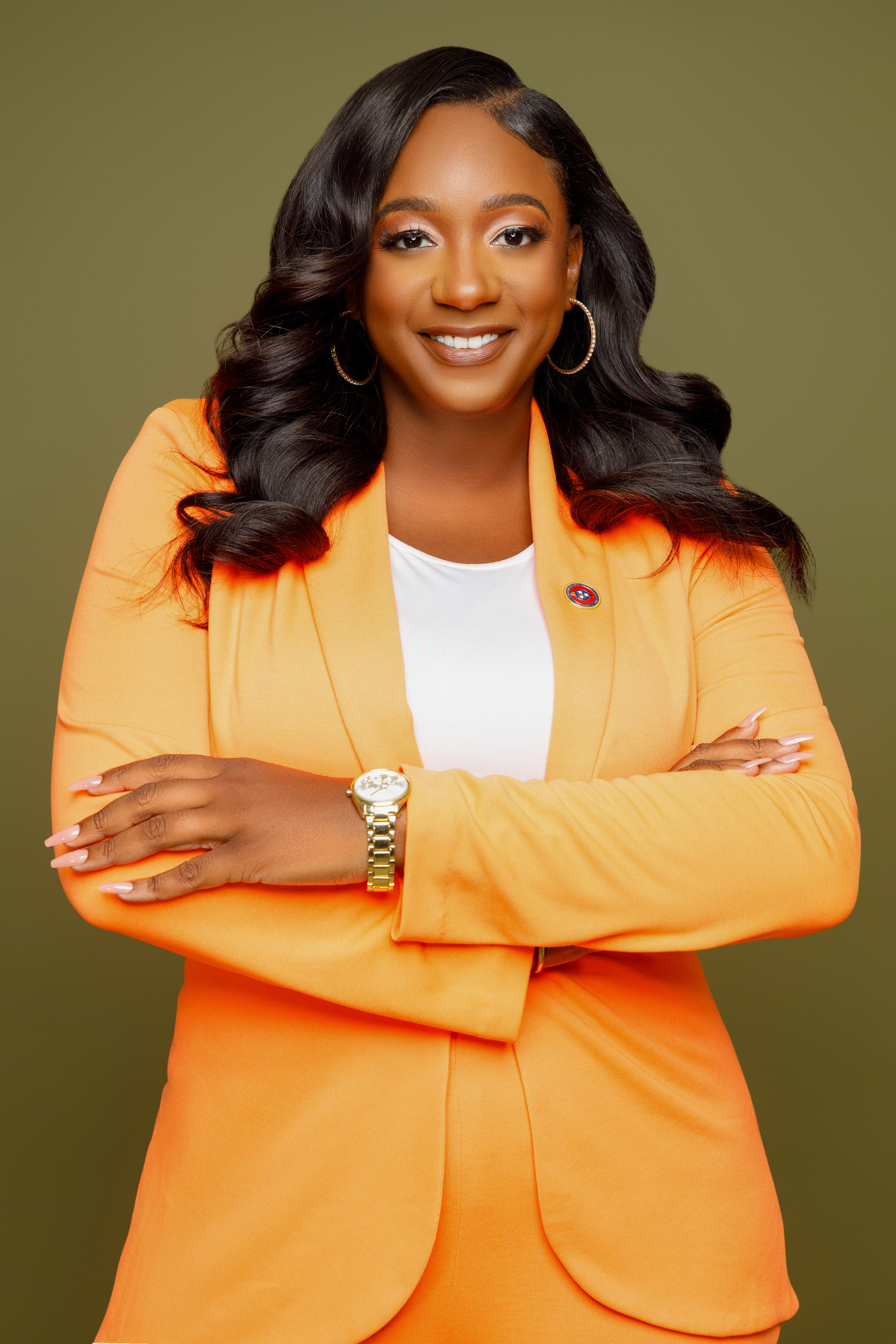
- Lamar in 2023

Member of the Tennessee Senate from the 33rd district
- Incumbent
- Assumed office March 8, 2022
- Preceded by: Katrina Robinson

Member of the Tennessee House of Representatives from the 91st district
- In office November 6, 2018 – March 8, 2022
- Preceded by: Raumesh Akbari
- Succeeded by: Torrey Harris

Personal details
- Born: December 29, 1990 (age 35) Memphis, Tennessee, U.S.
- Party: Democratic
- Education: Saint Mary's College (BA)
- Website: Campaign website

London Lamar (born December 29, 1990) is an American politician. A Democratic Party member, she serves in the Tennessee Senate representing district 33 since 2022. She was previously a member of the Tennessee House of Representatives from 2018 to 2022, representing District 91. During her time there, she was the youngest Tennessee State Representative in office. She was appointed to the Tennessee Senate in March 2022 by the Shelby County Commission.

== Education ==
Born and raised in Memphis, Tennessee, Lamar graduated in 2013 with her B.A. in Political Science from Saint Mary's College in Notre Dame, Indiana. She minored in Sociology and Intercultural Studies. She is a member of Alpha Kappa Alpha.

== 2018 election ==
Lamar defeated Doris DeBerry-Bradshaw and Juliette Eskridge in the 2018 Democratic primary. Lamar faced no opposition in the November general election.

2018 Democratic primary, Tennessee district 91
| Party | Candidate | Votes | % |
|---|---|---|---|
| Democratic | London Lamar | 3,392 | 47.1 |
| Democratic | Doris DeBerry-Bradshaw | 2,135 | 29.6 |
| Democratic | Juliette Eskridge | 1,681 | 23.3 |
| Total votes | | 7,208 | 100.0 |

== Career ==
Lamar is currently the senator of District 33 in Shelby County, Tennessee after serving as the representative for District 91. Additionally, she serves as the Senate Democratic Caucus Chairwoman, helping elect Democrats to the state senate. She is a member of The National Organization of Black Elected Legislative Women (NOBEL Women), and a member of National Black Caucus of State Legislators. She has previously served as the president of Tennessee Young Democrats, and Lamar was honored Memphis Flyer Top 20 under 30 Class of 2015 and Memphis Top 40 under 40 Class of 2017. She has sponsored 16 bills, co-sponsored 48, and co-sponsored 65 resolutions. According to her website, Lamar has a particularly strong focus on education, families, and communities.

== Committees ==
Lamar serves as a member of the Judiciary Committee and the Finance, Ways and Means Committee. She previously served on the Energy, Agriculture and Natural Resources Committee in the Senate. During her time in the state House of Representatives, she served as a member of the Local Committee, the Cities & Counties Subcommittee, the Transportation Committee, and the Safety & Funding Subcommittee.
