= Tennessee's 5th Senate district =

American legislative district

Tennessee's 5th State Senate district
Senator
Randy McNally; R–Oak Ridge
- Demographics: 83% White; 5% Black; 6% Hispanic; 1% Asian; 1% Other; 3% Multiracial
- Population (2022): 204,091

Tennessee's 5th Senate district is one of 33 districts in the Tennessee Senate. It has been represented by Republican Randy McNally, the current Lieutenant Governor of Tennessee, since 1987.

== Geography ==
District 5 covers all of Anderson and Loudon Counties and part of Knox County in the Knoxville metropolitan area, including some of Knoxville proper as well as the surrounding communities of Clinton, Lenoir City, Loudon, Tellico Village, Oliver Springs, and northern Oak Ridge.

The district is split between Tennessee's 2nd and 3rd congressional districts.

== Recent election results ==
Tennessee Senators are elected to staggered four-year terms, with odd-numbered districts holding elections in midterm years and even-numbered districts holding elections in presidential years.

=== 2018 ===
2018 Tennessee Senate election, District 5
Party	Candidate	Votes	%
Republican	Randy McNally (incumbent)	48,336	71.8
Democratic	Stuart Starr	18,948	28.2
Total votes		67,284	100
Republican hold			

=== 2014 ===
2014 Tennessee Senate election, District 5
Party	Candidate	Votes	%
Republican	Randy McNally (incumbent)	37,302	100
Total votes		37,302	100
Republican hold			

=== Federal and statewide results ===
Year	Office	Results
2020	President	Trump 67.2 – 30.7%
2016	President	Trump 68.1 – 27.2%
2012	President	Romney 68.6 – 29.6%
2012	Senate	Corker 74.0 – 20.5%
