= Steve Southerland (Tennessee politician) =

American politician (born 1955)

Member of the Tennessee Senate
- Incumbent
- Assumed office January 14, 2003
- Preceded by: Tommy Haun
- Constituency: 1st district (2003–2023); 9th district (2023–present)

Personal details
- Born: March 8, 1955 (age 71)
- Party: Republican
- Spouse: Cheri Southerland
- Children: 2
- Education: Walters State Community College
- Website: Senate website

Steve Southerland (born March 8, 1955) is a Republican member of the Tennessee Senate representing the 9th district, which encompasses Cocke County, Greene County, Hamblen County, and part of Sevier County.

== Biography ==
=== Early life ===
Steve Southerland was born on March 8, 1955. He attended Walters State Community College. He became a mortgage broker.

=== Career ===
He was elected to the 103rd - 110th General Assemblies. He is Vice-Chair of the Senate Commerce, Labor and Agriculture Committee. He serves as a member of the Senate Transportation Committee, the Senate Environment, Conservation and Tourism Committee, the Senate Ethics Committee, and the Joint Fiscal Review Committee. He is currently the Senate Deputy Speaker, Republican Caucus Chaplain, and he has been appointed to the Financial Services Standing Committee of the National Conference on State Legislatures. In a March 2004 interview with The Tennessean, Steve Southerland stated that he is against abortion and he does not believe that civil unions and domestic partnerships should be allowed in Tennessee.

He is a member of the Morristown Area Chamber of Commerce, the Rotary Club and the National Rifle Association of America. He attends a Baptist church.

=== Personal life ===
He is married to Cheri Southerland, and they have one daughter, Mattea. He is not related to former U. S. Representative Steve Southerland.

== See also ==
- Tennessee Monument to Unborn Children - A monument which Southerland sponsored legislation for
