= Tennessee's 27th Senate district =

American legislative district

Tennessee's 27th State Senate district
Senator
| Jack Johnson; R–Brentwood |
- Demographics: 82% White; 4% Black; 5% Hispanic; 6% Asian; 3% Multiracial
- Population (2022): 216,837

Tennessee's 27th Senate district is one of 33 districts in the Tennessee Senate. It has been represented by Republican Jack Johnson, the current Senate Majority Leader, since 2023. Prior to redistricting, he represented the 23rd district which was located in the same area as the current 27th district.

== Geography ==
District 27 covers most of Williamson County in the southern suburbs of Nashville, including the communities of Franklin, Brentwood, Fairview, Nolensville. It also includes most of Thompson's Station and part of Spring Hill.

The district is located partly within Tennessee's 7th and 5th congressional district, and overlaps with the 61st, 63rd, and 65th districts of the Tennessee House of Representatives.

== Recent election results ==
Tennessee Senators are elected to staggered four-year terms, with odd-numbered districts holding elections in midterm years and even-numbered districts holding elections in presidential years.

=== 2022 ===
2022 Tennessee Senate Primary election, District 27
| Party | Candidate | Votes | % |
|---|---|---|---|
| Republican | Jack Johnson (incumbent) | 12,470 | 51.63 |
| Republican | Gary Humble | 11,684 | 48.37 |
| Total votes | | 24,154 | 100 |

2022 Tennessee Senate general election, District 27
| Party | Candidate | Votes | % |
|---|---|---|---|
| Republican | Jack Johnson (incumbent) | 55,443 | 100% |
| Total votes | | 55,443 | 100% |
| Republican hold | | | |

=== 2018 ===
2018 Tennessee Senate election, District 23
| Party | Candidate | Votes | % |
|---|---|---|---|
| Republican | Jack Johnson (incumbent) | 68,118 | 66.9 |
| Democratic | Kristen Grimm | 33,710 | 33.1 |
| Total votes | | 101,828 | 100 |
| Republican hold | | | |

=== 2014 ===
2014 Tennessee Senate election, District 23
| Party | Candidate | Votes | % |
|---|---|---|---|
| Republican | Jack Johnson (incumbent) | 45,732 | 83.0 |
| Green | Amy Balderrama | 9,366 | 17.0 |
| Total votes | | 55,098 | 100 |
| Republican hold | | | |

=== Federal and statewide results ===
| Year | Office | Results |
|---|---|---|
| 2020 | President | Trump 62.2 – 36% |
| 2016 | President | Trump 65.1 – 29.6% |
| 2012 | President | Romney 72.6 – 26.1% |
| 2012 | Senate | Corker 77.3 – 17.9% |
