= Coopertown, Tennessee =

- Town
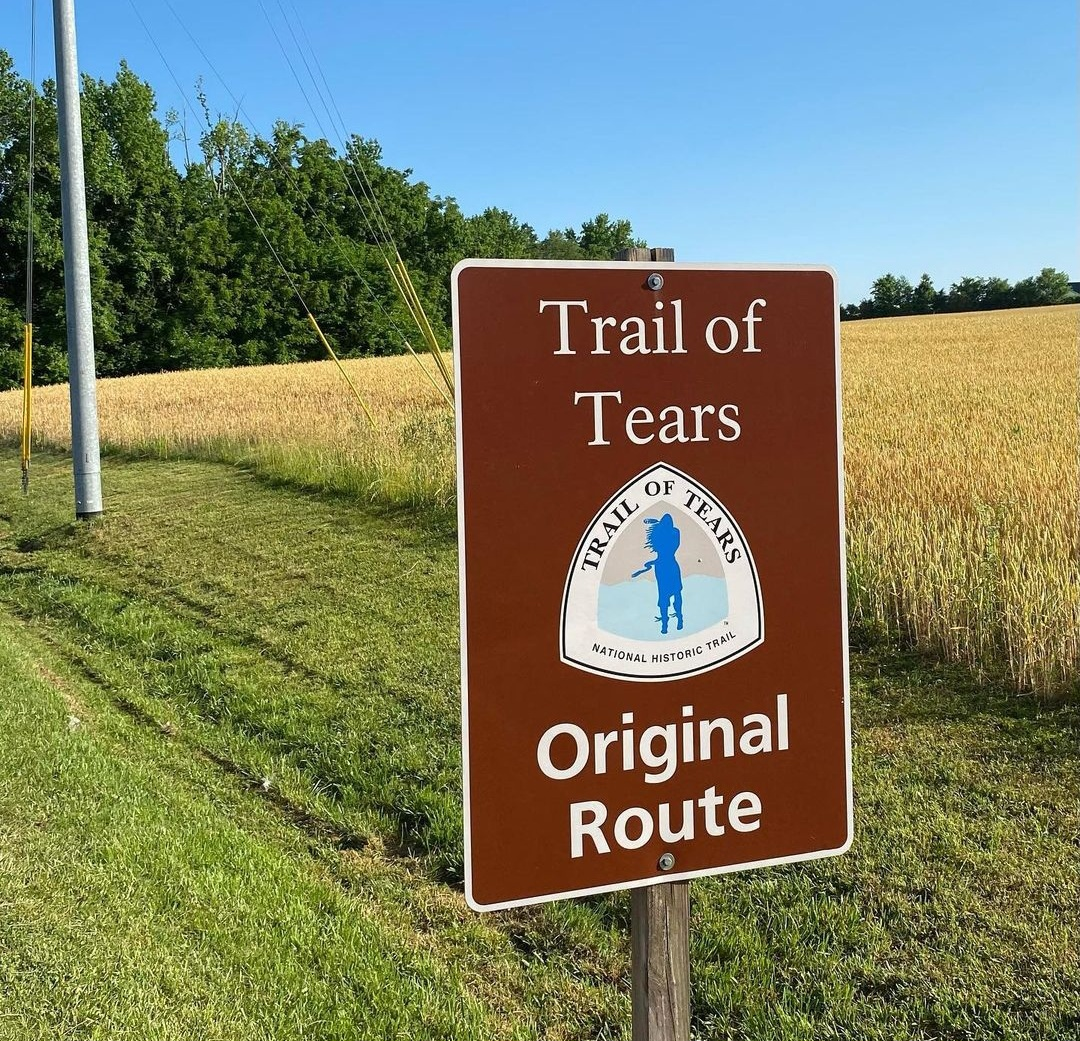
- Trail of Tears sign in Coopertown

- Logo
- Motto: "Looking to the Future; Cherishing the Past"
- Location of Coopertown in Robertson County, Tennessee.

- Location within Tennessee Location within the United States
- Coordinates: 36°26′15″N 86°58′02″W
- Country: United States
- State: Tennessee
- County: Robertson
- Incorporated: 1996

Government
  - Type: Mayor/Alderman
  - Mayor: Jeff Smith
  - Vice Mayor: Robert Dale Anderson
  - Chief of Police: Tyler Haley; Government Website

Area
  - Total: 31.60 sq mi (81.84 km^{2})
  - Land: 31.60 sq mi (81.84 km^{2})
  - Water: 0 sq mi (0.00 km^{2})
- Elevation: 725 ft (221 m)

Population (2020)
  - Total: 4,480 ▲
  - Estimate (2024): 4,781 ▲
  - Density: 141.8/sq mi (54.74/km^{2})
- Time zone: UTC-6 (CST)
  - Summer (DST): UTC-5 (CDT)
- Zip code: 37073, 37146, 37172
- Area codes: 615, 629
- FIPS code: 47-16980
- GNIS feature ID: 1306100
- Website: Official Website

Coopertown is a town in southern Robertson County. Located in Middle Tennessee, Coopertown is part of the Nashville-Davidson–Murfreesboro–Franklin, TN Metropolitan Statistical Area. As of the 2020 census, the population was 4,480.

== Speed trap reputation ==
In January 2006, Coopertown was called "one of the more blatant examples of speed traps" in the country by a spokesperson for the National Motorists Association (NMA). The town's mayor, Danny Crosby, defended the increased enforcement of lowered speed limits, citing the need to combat speeders using Highway 49 as a shortcut between I-24 and I-65.

A complaint and writ of ouster filed by the State of Tennessee on June 27, 2006, noted that comment from the NMA. That complaint sought to remove Crosby from office, due to acts of willful misconduct related to the speed traps, as well as other abuses of power.

The trial court dismissed the petition, reinstated Crosby as mayor of the City of Coopertown, and awarded Crosby his discretionary costs. An appeal was heard September 7, 2007.

In January 2008, the Tennessee Court of Appeals ruled that even though "the trial court accurately characterized conduct attributable to Crosby as 'bigotry, sexism, or utter foolishness'", the plaintiff failed to prove by "clear and convincing evidence" that Crosby "knowingly or willfully" committed the type of misconduct essential to establish the requisite statutory grounds to remove a public official from office.

== History ==
The tribal identities of the 16th and 17th century Native American occupants of present-day Tennessee are disputed. In later years, the part of Middle Tennessee that was to become the Coopertown community was claimed as territorial hunting grounds by both the Cherokee and the Chickasaw. That area was at the southern edge of what became known as the Transylvania Purchase, land purchased in 1775 from the Cherokee by Richard Henderson, a North Carolina land speculator seeking to establish a 14th colony.

David Naive settled there in 1825, and the area became known as Naive's Crossroads. During subsequent years, the county's involvement in the production of barrels and whiskey led to the establishment of one or more cooper shops in the community, making barrels for the nearby Red River mills. The presence of coopers led to the community's present name.

Coopertown was officially incorporated in 1996, a decision taken by the citizens of the community in response to a proposal to locate a landfill in the community. In August 2005, Coopertown Middle School opened, serving grades 6 to 8, and in 2007, grades 4 and 5 would move to the middle school.

In July 2016, groundbreaking occurred with Lowe's to build a 1.2 million sq. ft. fulfillment distribution center to employ 400 people and ramping up to 600 people. The facility opened in July 2018. It is located on York Rd. which is off I-24 at exit 24.

Former Mayors - Ethel Spiller (1996-2000), Herman Davis (2000-2004), Danny Crosby (2004–2008), J. Sam Childs (2008-2016), Glen Guyor (2016-2020), and Becca Warner (2020-2024)

== Geography ==
Interactive map of Coopertown

According to the United States Census Bureau, the town has a total area of 31.60 square miles (81.8 km^{2}), all of which is land. According to the United States Census Bureau, the town has a total area of 31.9 square miles (83 km^{2}), all land.

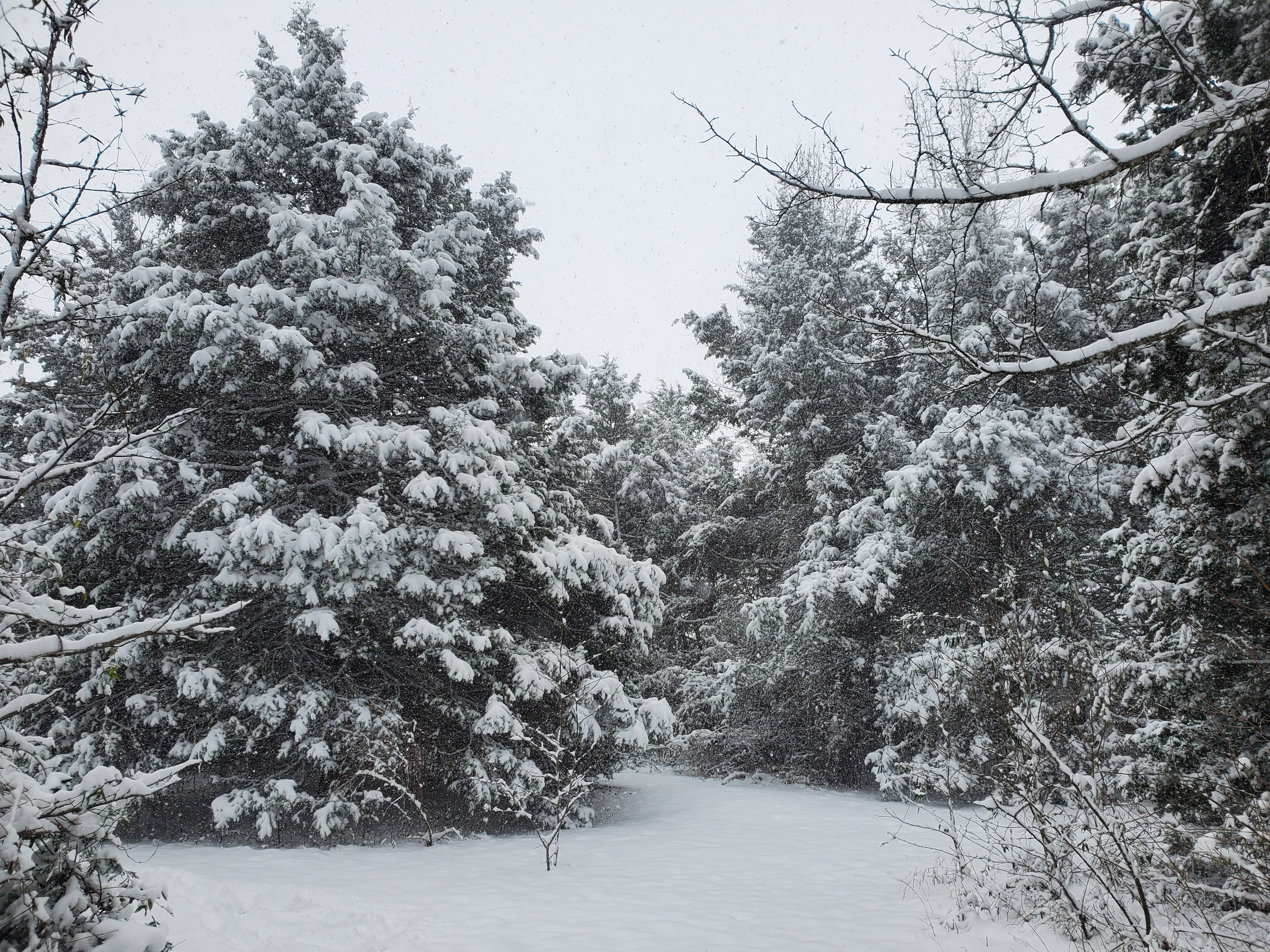
Snow in Coopertown.

== Demographics ==
Historical population
Census	Pop.	Note	%±
2000	3,027		—
2010	4,278		41.3%
2020	4,480		4.7%
2024 (est.)	4,781	▲	6.7%

=== 2020 census ===
As of the 2020 census, Coopertown had a population of 4,480 and 1,334 families.

The median age was 44.8 years. 21.2% of residents were under the age of 18 and 16.9% of residents were 65 years of age or older. For every 100 females there were 102.2 males, and for every 100 females age 18 and over there were 99.9 males age 18 and over.

0.0% of residents lived in urban areas, while 100.0% lived in rural areas.

There were 1,613 households in Coopertown, of which 33.7% had children under the age of 18 living in them. Of all households, 69.1% were married-couple households, 11.6% were households with a male householder and no spouse or partner present, and 13.6% were households with a female householder and no spouse or partner present. About 14.8% of all households were made up of individuals and 5.8% had someone living alone who was 65 years of age or older.

There were 1,665 housing units, of which 3.1% were vacant. The homeowner vacancy rate was 1.1% and the rental vacancy rate was 2.4%.

Coopertown racial composition
Race	Number	Percentage
White (non-Hispanic)	3,869	86.36%
Black or African American (non-Hispanic)	139	3.1%
Native American	15	0.33%
Asian	25	0.56%
Pacific Islander	5	0.11%
Other/Mixed	215	4.8%
Hispanic or Latino	212	4.73%

=== 2000 census ===
As of the census of 2000, there were 3,027 people, 1,078 households, and 914 families residing in the town. The population density was 95.0 inhabitants per square mile (36.7/km^{2}). There were 1,128 housing units at an average density of 35.4 per square mile (13.7/km^{2}). The racial makeup of the town was 95.97% White, 1.62% African American, 0.46% Asian, 0.40% Native American, 0.59% from other races, and 0.96% from two or more races. Hispanic or Latino of any race were 1.26% of the population.

There were 1,078 households, out of which 40.1% had children under the age of 18 living with them, 73.4% were married couples living together, 7.1% had a female householder with no husband present, and 15.2% were non-families. 11.9% of all households were made up of individuals, and 4.0% had someone living alone who was 65 years of age or older. The average household size was 2.81 and the average family size was 3.03.

In the town, the population was spread out, with 26.8% under the age of 18, 6.1% from 18 to 24, 33.8% from 25 to 44, 24.7% from 45 to 64, and 8.6% who were 65 years of age or older. The median age was 36 years. For every 100 females, there were 104.7 males. For every 100 females age 18 and over, there were 104.3 males.

The median income for a household in the town was $56,122, and the median income for a family was $58,947. Males had a median income of $37,059 versus $25,875 for females. The per capita income for the town was $24,818. About 4.1% of families and 5.5% of the population were below the poverty line, including 6.9% of those under age 18 and 10.7% of those age 65 or over.

== Notable people ==
- Bert James, baseball player.
