= Tennessee's 1st Senate district =

American legislative district

Tennessee's 1st State Senate district
Senator
J. Adam Lowe; R–Calhoun
- Demographics: 86% White; 4% Black; 6% Hispanic; 1% Asian; 3% Multiracial
- Population (2022): 203,866

Tennessee's 1st Senate district is one of 33 districts in the Tennessee Senate. It has been represented by Republican Adam Lowe since 2023. Before 2022 redistricting, the district was mainly located where the current 9th district is now.

== Geography ==
District 1 covers much of rural East Tennessee bordering Hamilton County and Georgia. The district includes all of Rhea, Meigs, and McMinn Counties and part of Bradley County. Communities in the district include Dayton, Decatur, Athens, and Cleveland.

The district is located within Tennessee's 3rd and 4th congressional districts.

== Recent election results ==
Tennessee Senators are elected to staggered four-year terms, with odd-numbered districts holding elections in midterm years and even-numbered districts holding elections in presidential years.

=== 2018 ===
2018 Tennessee Senate election, District 9
Party	Candidate	Votes	%
Republican	Mike Bell (incumbent)	45,006	77.7
Democratic	Carl Lansden	12,887	22.3
Total votes		57,893	100
Republican hold			

=== 2014 ===
2014 Tennessee Senate election, District 9
Party	Candidate	Votes	%
Republican	Mike Bell (incumbent)	31,748	100
Total votes		31,748	100
Republican hold			

=== Federal and statewide results ===
Year	Office	Results
2020	President	Trump 78.0 – 20.6%
2016	President	Trump 77.1 – 19.6%
2012	President	Romney 72.4 – 26.1%
2012	Senate	Corker 77.5 – 19.0%
