= Tennessee's 25th Senate district =

American legislative district

Tennessee's 25th State Senate district
Senator
Ed Jackson; R–Jackson
- Demographics: 68% White; 23% Black; 4% Hispanic; 1% Asian; 3% Multiracial
- Population (2022): 204,075

Tennessee's 25th Senate district is one of 33 districts in the Tennessee Senate. It has been represented by Republican Ed Jackson since 2023. Prior to redistricting, he represented the 27th district which was at the time located in the same general area as the current 25th district.

== Geography ==
District 25 spans the state's border along the Mississippi River, also stretching inland to cover the city of Jackson. The district covers all of Crockett, Dyer, Lake, Madison, Henderson, Decatur, and Perry Counties; other communities within the district include Dyersburg, Tiptonville, Newbern, and Alamo.

The district is located entirely within Tennessee's 8th congressional district. It borders the states of Kentucky, Missouri, and Arkansas.

== Recent election results ==
Tennessee Senators are elected to staggered four-year terms, with odd-numbered districts holding elections in midterm years and even-numbered districts holding elections in presidential years.

=== 2022 ===
Republican Primary, 2022
Party	Candidate	Votes	%
Republican	Ed Jackson	16,039	100
Total votes		16,039	100

Tennessee's 25th State Senate District General Election, 2022
Party	Candidate	Votes	%
Republican	Ed Jackson	35,766	79.4%
Independent	Ronnie Henley	9,278	20.6%
Total votes		45,044	100%

=== 2018 ===
2018 Tennessee Senate election, District 27
Primary election
Party	Candidate	Votes	%
Republican	Ed Jackson (incumbent)	14,404	70.8
Republican	Brandon Dodds	5,951	29.2
Total votes		20,355	100
Democratic	Savannah Williamson	3,692	43.0
Democratic	Jackie Williams	3,637	42.3
Democratic	John York Jr.	1,259	14.7
Total votes		8,588	100
General election
Republican	Ed Jackson (incumbent)	35,837	65.1
Democratic	Savannah Williamson	19,177	34.9
Total votes		55,014	100
Republican hold			

=== 2014 ===
2014 Tennessee Senate election, District 27
Primary election
Party	Candidate	Votes	%
Republican	Ed Jackson	11,136	58.9
Republican	Brandon Dodds	7,763	41.1
Total votes		18,899	100
General election
Republican	Ed Jackson	23,331	60.2
Democratic	Randy Lamb	13,515	34.9
Constitution	Tim York	1,139	2.9
Independent	James Baxter	779	2.0
Total votes		38,764	100
Republican gain from Democratic			

=== Federal and statewide results ===
Year	Office	Results
2020	President	Trump 63.2 – 35.4%
2016	President	Trump 62.7 – 34.9%
2012	President	Romney 58.6 – 40.5%
2012	Senate	Corker 63.2 – 33.7%
