= 2018 Tennessee Senate election =

2018 Tennessee State Senate election
- November 6, 2018

18 of the 33 seats in the Tennessee State Senate 17 seats needed for a majority
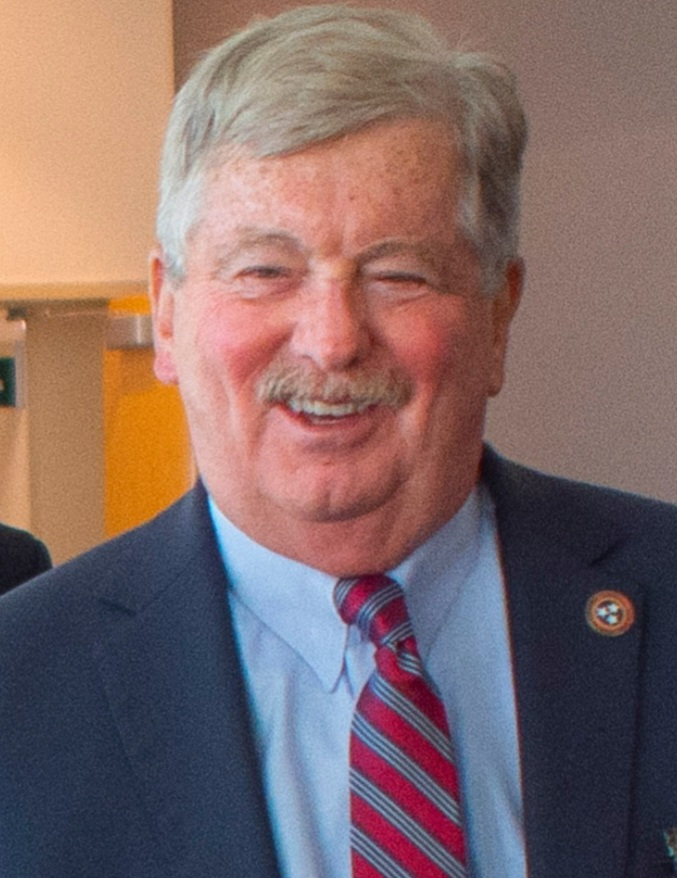

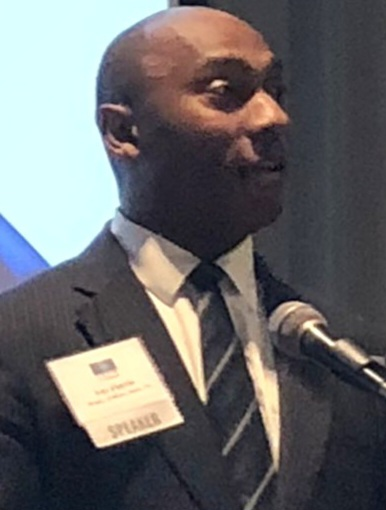
	Majority party	Minority party
Leader	Randy McNally	Lee Harris (retired)
Party	Republican	Democratic
Leader's seat	5th – Oak Ridge	29th – Memphis
Last election	28 seats	5 seats
Seats before	28	5
Seats won	28	5
Seat change	Steady	Steady
Popular vote	671,278	459,033
Percentage	58.86%	40.25%
Swing	▼21.96%	▲22.85%
- Republican hold Democratic hold No Election 50–60% 60–70% 70–80% >90% 80–90% >90%
Speaker before election
Randy McNally
Republican
Elected Speaker
Randy McNally
Republican

The 2018 Tennessee State Senate election was held on November 6, 2018, to elect 18 of the 33 seats for the Tennessee's State Senate. The elections coincided with the Governor, U.S. Senate, U.S. House, and State House elections. The primary elections were held on August 2, 2018.

Following the 2018 elections, no seats changed hands, leaving Tennessee's State Senate delegation at a 28–5 Republican supermajority.

== Background ==
Following Republican Doug Overbey's appointment as U.S. Attorney for the Eastern District of Tennessee in 2017, fellow Republican Art Swann was appointed to replace him. Per Tennessee state law, Swann had to run in an off-cycle election in 2018 to retain the seat for the remainder of Overbey's term.

== Retirements ==
Three incumbents (2 Democrats and 1 Republican) did not run for re-election in 2018. Those incumbents are:

=== Democrats ===
1. District 19: Thelma Harper retired.
2. District 29: Lee Harris retired to run for mayor of Shelby County.

=== Republicans ===
1. District 13: Bill Ketron retired to run for mayor of Rutherford County.

== Incumbents defeated ==
=== In the primary election ===
==== Democrats ====
1. District 33: Reginald Tate lost renomination to Katrina Robinson.

== Predictions ==
Source	Ranking	As of
Governing	Safe R	Oct. 8, 2018

== Results summary ==
Summary of the November 6, 2018 Tennessee Senate election results
Party	Candidates	Votes		Seats				
Party	Candidates	No.	%	Before	Up	Won	After	+/–
Republican	16	671,278	58.86	28	14	14	28	Steady
Democratic	15	459,033	40.25	5	4	4	5	Steady
Independent	2	9,756	0.86	0	0	0	0	Steady
Write-in	2	421	0.04	0	0	0	0	Steady
Total		1,140,488	100	33	18	18	33	Steady

Popular vote
Republican	58.86%
Democratic	40.25%
Other	0.90%

Senate seats
Republican	84.85%
Democratic	15.15%

=== Closest race ===
This race was decided by a margin of under 10%:

District	Winner	Margin
District 31	Republican	1.78%

== District 1 ==
2018 Tennessee's 1st Senate district election
- November 6, 2018
Nominee	Steve Southerland
Party	Republican
Popular vote	43,262
Percentage	100%
Senator before election
Steve Southerland
Republican
Elected Senator
Steve Southerland
Republican

=== Republican primary ===
Republican primary
Party	Candidate	Votes	%
Republican	Steve Southerland (incumbent)	22,806	100
Total votes		22,806	100

=== General election ===
Tennessee's 1st State Senate District general election, 2018
Party	Candidate	Votes	%
Republican	Steve Southerland (incumbent)	43,262	100
Total votes		43,262	100

== District 2 (special) ==
2018 Tennessee's 2nd Senate district special election
- November 6, 2018
Nominee	Art Swann
Party	Republican
Popular vote	55,595
Percentage	99.28%
Senator before election
Art Swann
Republican
Elected Senator
Art Swann
Republican

=== Republican primary ===
Republican primary
Party	Candidate	Votes	%
Republican	Art Swann (incumbent)	13,824	56.54
Republican	Scott P. Williams	6,836	27.96
Republican	Wesley P. Maples	3,792	15.51
Total votes		24,452	100

=== Democratic primary ===
Democratic primary
Party	Candidate	Votes	%
Democratic	J. Nathan Higdon (write-in)	314	100
Total votes		314	100

=== Special election ===
Tennessee's 2nd State Senate District special election, 2018
Party	Candidate	Votes	%
Republican	Art Swann (incumbent)	55,595	99.28
Write-in	J. Nathan Higdon	402	0.72
Total votes		55,997	100

== District 3 ==
2018 Tennessee's 3rd Senate district election
- November 6, 2018
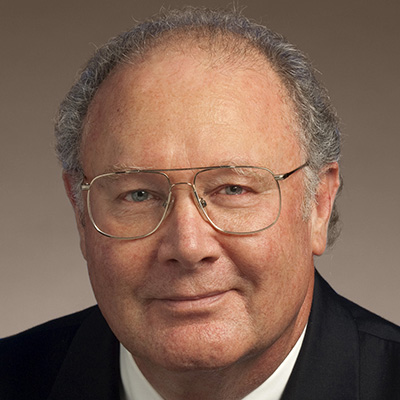
Nominee	Rusty Crowe
Party	Republican
Popular vote	50,236
Percentage	100%
Senator before election
Rusty Crowe
Republican
Elected Senator
Rusty Crowe
Republican

=== Republican primary ===
Republican primary
Party	Candidate	Votes	%
Republican	Rusty Crowe (incumbent)	22,481	100
Total votes		22,481	100

=== General election ===
Tennessee's 3rd State Senate District general election, 2018
Party	Candidate	Votes	%
Republican	Rusty Crowe (incumbent)	50,236	100
Total votes		50,236	100

== District 5 ==
2018 Tennessee's 5th Senate district election
- November 6, 2018
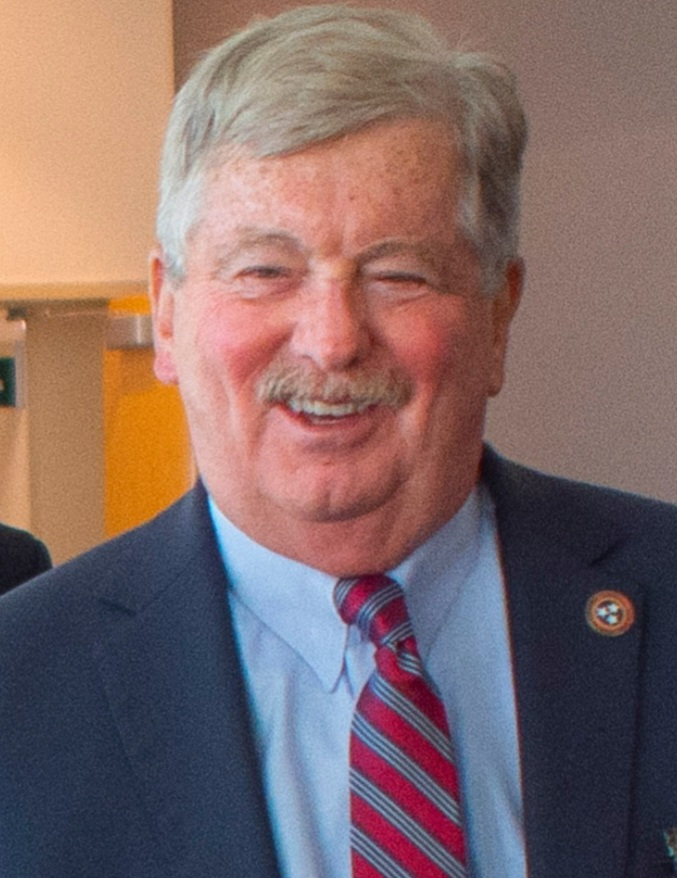

Nominee	Randy McNally	Stuart Starr
Party	Republican	Democratic
Popular vote	48,336	18,948
Percentage	71.84%	28.16%
Senator before election
Randy McNally
Republican
Elected Senator
Randy McNally
Republican

=== Republican primary ===
Republican primary
Party	Candidate	Votes	%
Republican	Randy McNally (incumbent)	23,525	100
Total votes		23,525	100

=== Democratic primary ===
Democratic primary
Party	Candidate	Votes	%
Democratic	Stuart Starr	6,303	100
Total votes		6,303	100

=== General election ===
Tennessee's 5th State Senate District general election, 2018
Party	Candidate	Votes	%
Republican	Randy McNally (incumbent)	48,336	71.84
Democratic	Stuart Starr	18,948	28.16
Total votes		67,284	100

== District 7 ==
2018 Tennessee's 7th Senate district election
- November 6, 2018
Nominee	Richard Briggs	Jamie Ballinger
Party	Republican	Democratic
Popular vote	38,558	30,826
Percentage	55.57%	44.43%
Senator before election
Richard Briggs
Republican
Elected Senator
Richard Briggs
Republican

=== Republican primary ===
Republican primary
Party	Candidate	Votes	%
Republican	Richard Briggs (incumbent)	19,166	100
Total votes		19,166	100

=== Democratic primary ===
Democratic primary
Party	Candidate	Votes	%
Democratic	Jamie Ballinger	9,319	100
Total votes		9,319	100

=== General election ===
Tennessee's 7th State Senate District general election, 2018
Party	Candidate	Votes	%
Republican	Richard Briggs (incumbent)	38,558	55.57
Democratic	Jamie Ballinger	30,826	44.43
Total votes		69,384	100

== District 9 ==
2018 Tennessee's 9th Senate district election
- November 6, 2018
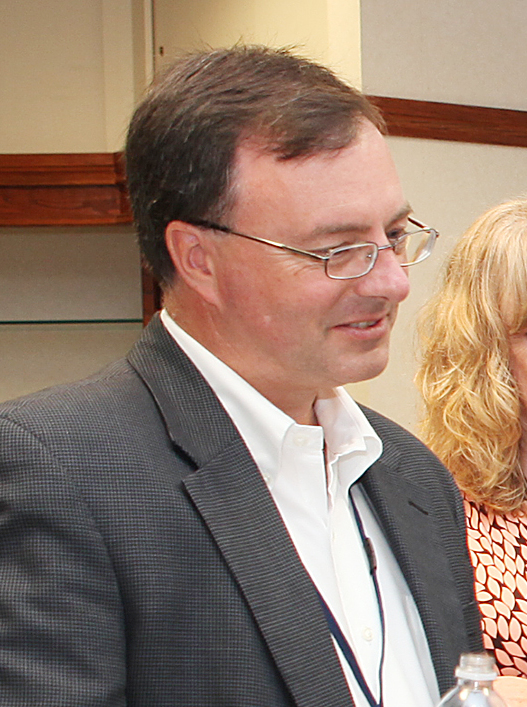

Nominee	Mike Bell	Carl Lansden
Party	Republican	Democratic
Popular vote	45,006	12,887
Percentage	77.74%	22.26%
Senator before election
Mike Bell
Republican
Elected Senator
Mike Bell
Republican

=== Republican primary ===
Republican primary
Party	Candidate	Votes	%
Republican	Mike Bell (incumbent)	24,548	100
Total votes		24,548	100

=== Democratic primary ===
Democratic primary
Party	Candidate	Votes	%
Democratic	Carl Lansden	4,775	100
Total votes		4,775	100

=== General election ===
Tennessee's 9th State Senate District general election, 2018
Party	Candidate	Votes	%
Republican	Mike Bell (incumbent)	45,006	77.74
Democratic	Carl Lansden	12,887	22.26
Total votes		57,893	100

== District 11 ==
2018 Tennessee's 11th Senate district election
- November 6, 2018
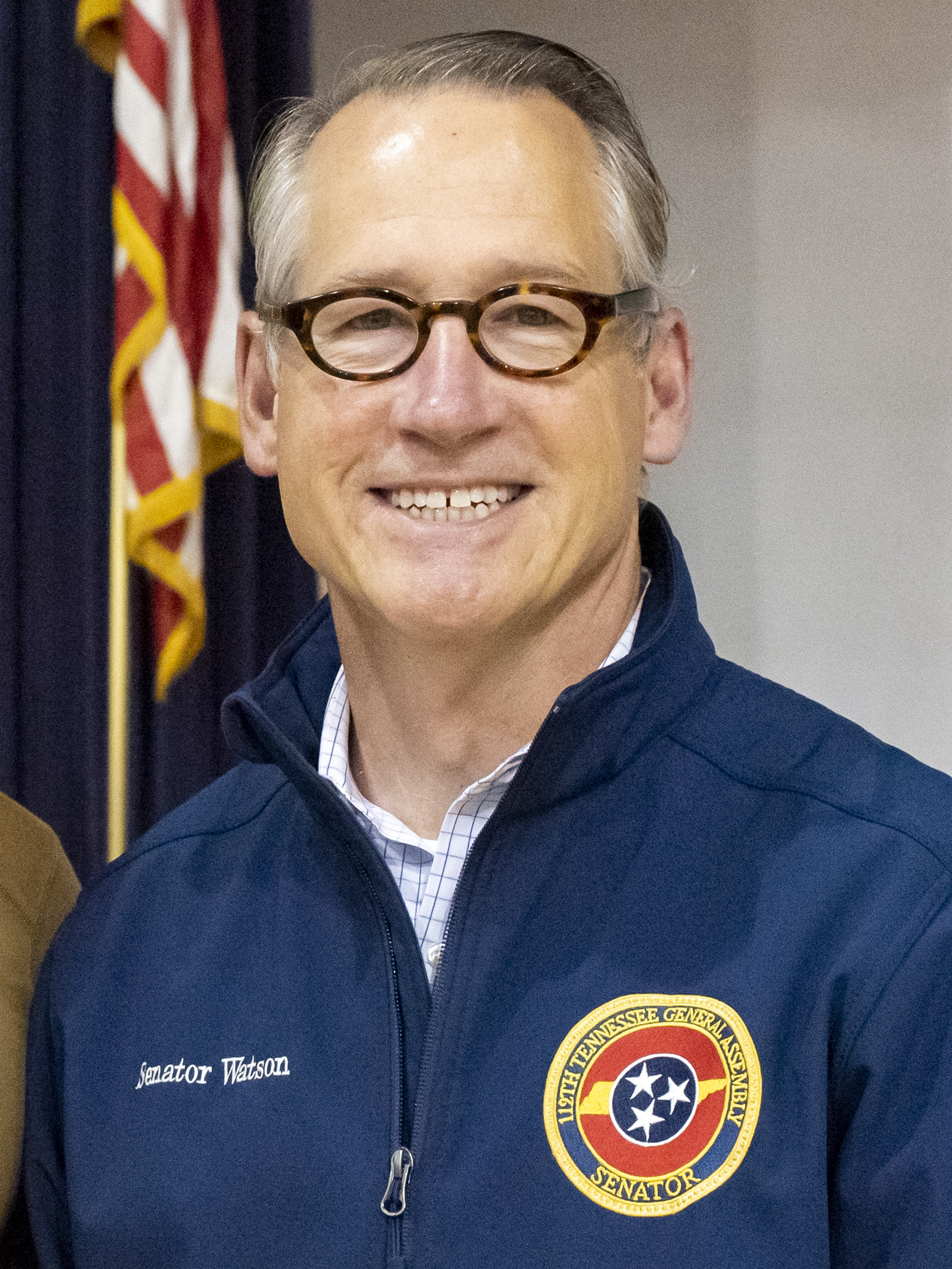

Nominee	Bo Watson	Randall "Randy" Price
Party	Republican	Democratic
Popular vote	51,082	27,332
Percentage	65.14%	34.86%
Senator before election
Bo Watson
Republican
Elected Senator
Bo Watson
Republican

=== Republican primary ===
Republican primary
Party	Candidate	Votes	%
Republican	Bo Watson (incumbent)	20,257	100
Total votes		20,257	100

=== Democratic primary ===
Democratic primary
Party	Candidate	Votes	%
Democratic	Randall "Randy" Price	8,152	100
Total votes		8,152	100

=== General election ===
Tennessee's 11th State Senate District general election, 2018
Party	Candidate	Votes	%
Republican	Bo Watson (incumbent)	51,082	65.14
Democratic	Randall "Randy" Price	27,332	34.86
Total votes		78,414	100

== District 13 ==
2018 Tennessee's 13th Senate district election
- November 6, 2018
Nominee	Dawn White	Kelly Northcutt
Party	Republican	Democratic
Popular vote	36,594	25,974
Percentage	57.07%	40.50%
Senator before election
Bill Ketron
Republican
Elected Senator
Dawn White
Republican

=== Republican primary ===
Republican primary
Party	Candidate	Votes	%
Republican	Dawn White (incumbent)	10,639	58.22
Republican	Ernest G. Burgess	7,635	41.78
Total votes		18,274	100

=== Democratic primary ===
Democratic primary
Party	Candidate	Votes	%
Democratic	Kelly Northcutt	8,217	100
Total votes		8,217	100

=== General election ===
Tennessee's 13th State Senate District general election, 2018
Party	Candidate	Votes	%
Republican	Dawn White (incumbent)	36,594	57.07
Democratic	Kelly Northcutt	25,974	40.50
Independent	Ginger Smith	1,559	2.43
Total votes		64,127	100

== District 15 ==
2018 Tennessee's 15th Senate district election
- November 6, 2018
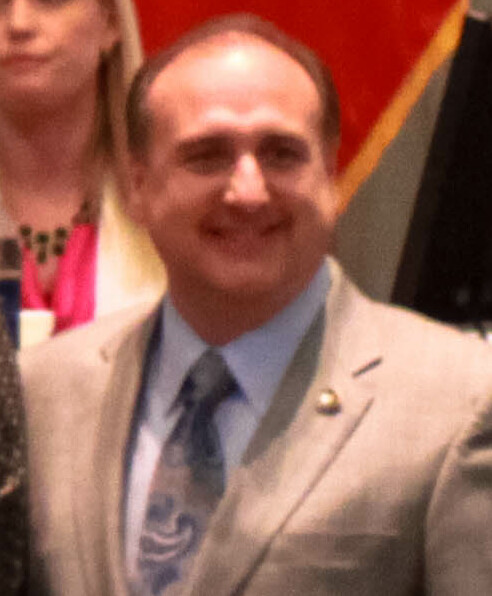

Nominee	Paul Bailey	Angela Hedgecough
Party	Republican	Democratic
Popular vote	48,919	17,512
Percentage	73.64%	26.36%
Senator before election
Paul Bailey
Republican
Elected Senator
Paul Bailey
Republican

=== Republican primary ===
Republican primary
Party	Candidate	Votes	%
Republican	Paul Bailey (incumbent)	25,808	100
Total votes		25,808	100

=== Democratic primary ===
Democratic primary
Party	Candidate	Votes	%
Democratic	Angela Hedgecough	7,636	100
Total votes		7,636	100

=== General election ===
Tennessee's 15th State Senate District general election, 2018
Party	Candidate	Votes	%
Republican	Paul Bailey (incumbent)	48,919	73.64
Democratic	Angela Hedgecough	17,512	26.36
Total votes		66,431	100

== District 17 ==
2018 Tennessee's 17th Senate district election
- November 6, 2018
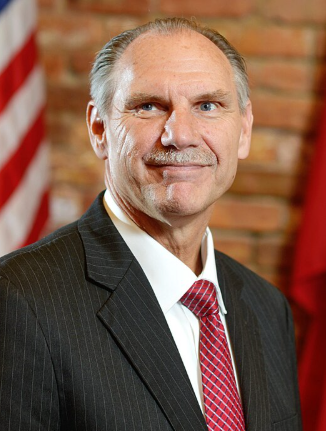

Nominee	Mark Pody	Mary Alice Carfi
Party	Republican	Democratic
Popular vote	53,364	22,452
Percentage	70.39%	29.61%
Senator before election
Mark Pody
Republican
Elected Senator
Mark Pody
Republican

=== Background ===
In September 2017, Tennessee state senator Mae Beavers resigned her seat to run for governor. This resignation required a special election to fill the seat for the remaining year of her term. Republican Mark Pody ran unopposed in the Republican primary, and he defeated Democrat Mary Alice Carfi in the special election, 5,995 to 5,688.

2017 Tennessee Senate special election, District 17
Party	Candidate	Votes	%
Republican	Mark Pody	5,995	51.3
Democratic	Mary Alice Carfi	5,688	48.7
Total votes		11,683	100
Republican hold			

=== Republican primary ===
Republican primary
Party	Candidate	Votes	%
Republican	Mark Pody (incumbent)	31,437	100
Total votes		31,437	100

=== Democratic primary ===
Democratic primary
Party	Candidate	Votes	%
Democratic	Mary Alice Carfi	10,460	100
Total votes		10,460	100

=== General election ===
Tennessee's 17th State Senate District general election, 2018
Party	Candidate	Votes	%
Republican	Mark Pody (incumbent)	53,364	70.39
Democratic	Mary Alice Carfi	22,452	29.61
Total votes		75,816	100

== District 19 ==
2018 Tennessee's 19th Senate district election
- November 6, 2018
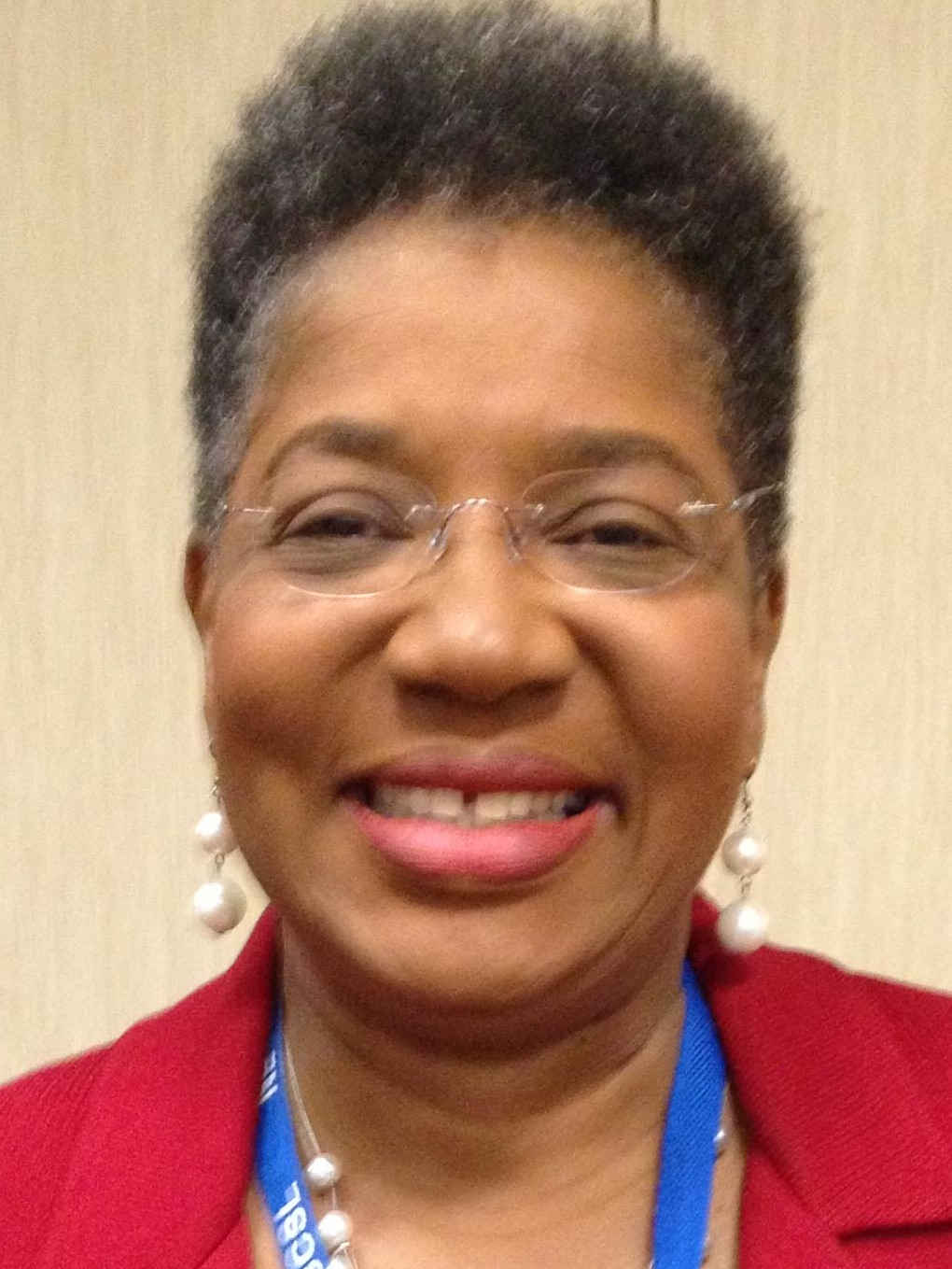

Nominee	Brenda Gilmore	Christina "Chris" Callaway
Party	Democratic	Independent
Popular vote	49,586	6,271
Percentage	85.79%	10.85%
Senator before election
Thelma Harper
Democratic
Elected Senator
Brenda Gilmore
Democratic

=== Democratic primary ===
Democratic primary
Party	Candidate	Votes	%
Democratic	Brenda Gilmore	13,885	64.70
Democratic	Howard Jones	5,262	24.52
Democratic	Sandra Moore	1,181	5.50
Democratic	George Thomas	1,132	5.28
Total votes		21,460	100

=== General election ===
Tennessee's 19th State Senate District general election, 2018
Party	Candidate	Votes	%
Democratic	Brenda Gilmore	49,586	85.79
Independent	Christina "Chris" Callaway	6,271	10.85
Independent	Rueben "Dock" Dockery	1,926	3.33
Total votes		57,783	100

== District 21 ==
2018 Tennessee's 21st Senate district election
- November 6, 2018
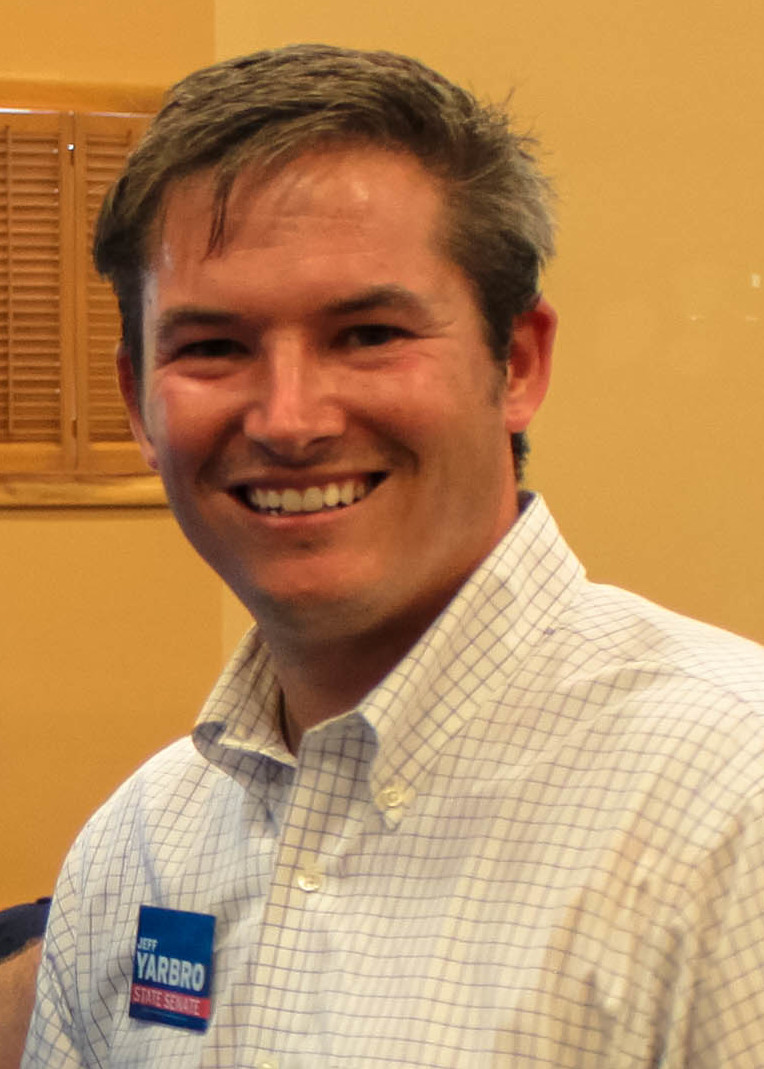
Nominee	Jeff Yarbro
Party	Democratic
Popular vote	55,905
Percentage	100%
Senator before election
Jeff Yarbro
Democratic
Elected Senator
Jeff Yarbro
Democratic

=== Democratic primary ===
Democratic primary
Party	Candidate	Votes	%
Democratic	Jeff Yarbro (incumbent)	19,402	100
Total votes		19,402	100

=== General election ===
Tennessee's 21st State Senate District general election, 2018
Party	Candidate	Votes	%
Democratic	Jeff Yarbro (incumbent)	55,905	100
Total votes		55,905	100

== District 23 ==
2018 Tennessee's 23rd Senate district election
- November 6, 2018
Nominee	Jack Johnson	Kristen Grimm
Party	Republican	Democratic
Popular vote	68,118	33,710
Percentage	66.90%	33.11%
Senator before election
Jack Johnson
Republican
Elected Senator
Jack Johnson
Republican

=== Republican primary ===
Republican primary
Party	Candidate	Votes	%
Republican	Jack Johnson (incumbent)	26,893	100
Total votes		26,893	100

=== Democratic primary ===
Democratic primary
Party	Candidate	Votes	%
Democratic	Kristen Grimm	9,673	100
Total votes		9,673	100

=== General election ===
Tennessee's 23rd State Senate District general election, 2018
Party	Candidate	Votes	%
Republican	Jack Johnson (incumbent)	68,118	66.90
Democratic	Kristen Grimm	33,710	33.11
Total votes		101,828	100

== District 25 ==
2018 Tennessee's 25th Senate district election
- November 6, 2018
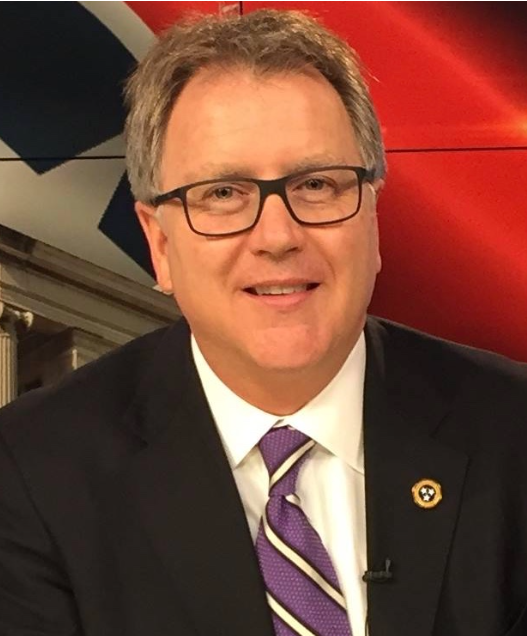

Nominee	Kerry Roberts	Wade Munday
Party	Republican	Democratic
Popular vote	47,188	18,795
Percentage	71.52%	28.49%
- County results Roberts: 60–70% 70–80%
Senator before election
Kerry Roberts
Republican
Elected Senator
Kerry Roberts
Republican

=== Republican primary ===
Republican primary
Party	Candidate	Votes	%
Republican	Kerry Roberts (incumbent)	23,909	100
Total votes		23,909	100

=== Democratic primary ===
Democratic primary
Party	Candidate	Votes	%
Democratic	Wade Munday	9,078	100
Total votes		9,078	100

=== General election ===
Tennessee's 25th State Senate District general election, 2018
Party	Candidate	Votes	%
Republican	Kerry Roberts (incumbent)	47,188	71.52
Democratic	Wade Munday	18,795	28.49
Total votes		65,983	100

== District 27 ==
2018 Tennessee's 27th Senate district election
- November 6, 2018
Nominee	Ed Jackson	Savannah Williamson
Party	Republican	Democratic
Popular vote	35,837	19,177
Percentage	65.14%	34.86%
Senator before election
Ed Jackson
Republican
Elected Senator
Ed Jackson
Republican

=== Republican primary ===
Republican primary
Party	Candidate	Votes	%
Republican	Ed Jackson (incumbent)	14,404	70.76
Republican	Brandon Dodds	5,951	29.24
Total votes		20,355	100

=== Democratic primary ===
Democratic primary
Party	Candidate	Votes	%
Democratic	Savannah Williamson	3,692	42.99
Democratic	Jackie Williams	3,637	42.35
Democratic	John H. York Jr.	1,259	14.66
Total votes		8,588	100

=== General election ===
Tennessee's 27th State Senate District general election, 2018
Party	Candidate	Votes	%
Republican	Ed Jackson (incumbent)	35,837	65.14
Democratic	Savannah Williamson	19,177	34.86
Total votes		55,014	100

== District 29 ==
2018 Tennessee's 29th Senate district election
- November 6, 2018
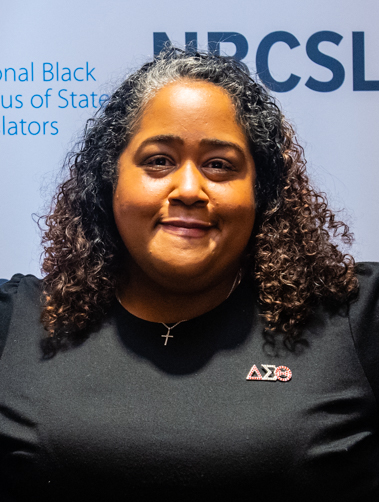

Nominee	Raumesh Akbari	Tom Stephens
Party	Democratic	Republican
Popular vote	43,851	8,679
Percentage	83.48%	16.52%
Senator before election
Lee Harris
Democratic
Elected Senator
Raumesh Akbari
Democratic

Incumbent Lee Harris retired to successfully run for Shelby County Mayor.

=== Democratic primary ===
Democratic primary
Party	Candidate	Votes	%
Democratic	Raumesh Akbari	14,861	58.42
Democratic	Justin Ford	10,577	41.58
Total votes		25,438	100

=== Republican primary ===
Republican primary
Party	Candidate	Votes	%
Republican	Tom Stephens	3,873	100
Total votes		3,873	100

=== General election ===
Tennessee's 29th State Senate District general election, 2018
Party	Candidate	Votes	%
Democratic	Raumesh Akbari	43,851	83.48
Republican	Tom Stephens	8,679	16.52
Total votes		52,530	100

== District 31 ==
2018 Tennessee's 31st Senate district election
- November 6, 2018
Nominee	Brian Kelsey	Gabby Salinas
Party	Republican	Democratic
Popular vote	40,504	39,086
Percentage	50.89%	49.11%
- Precinct results Kelsey: 50–60% 60–70% 70–80% Salinas: 50–60% 60–70% 70–80%
Senator before election
Brian Kelsey
Republican
Elected Senator
Brian Kelsey
Republican

The 31th senate district was based in Shelby County, and encompassed parts of East Memphis and some of Memphis's suburbs, including Cordova and Germantown. The district had been represented by Republican Brian Kelsey, who won re-election in 2014 unopposed. The district had been labeled competitive, and Kelsey was considered the most vulnerable incumbent heading into 2018, as the district had been trending leftwards due to changing demographics.

Incumbent Brian Kelsey narrowly won re-election by 1.8%, defeating his Democratic opponent Gabby Salinas.

In the concurrent gubernatorial and senate elections, the district voted for Republican gubernatorial nominee Bill Lee by 3.5% and Democratic senate nominee Phil Bredesen by 7.5%.

=== Republican primary ===
Republican primary
Party	Candidate	Votes	%
Republican	Brian Kelsey (incumbent)	22,767	100.00%
Total votes		22,767	100.00%

=== Democratic primary ===
Democratic primary
Party	Candidate	Votes	%
Democratic	Gabby Salinas	7,737	47.98%
Democratic	David Weatherspoon	6,890	42.73%
Democratic	M. Rodanial Ray Ransom	1,499	9.30%
Total votes		16,126	100.00%

=== General election ===
Tennessee's 31st State Senate District general election, 2018
Party	Candidate	Votes	%
Republican	Brian Kelsey (incumbent)	40,504	50.89%
Democratic	Gabby Salinas	39,086	49.11%
Total votes		79,590	100.00%

== District 33 ==
2018 Tennessee's 33rd Senate district election
- November 6, 2018
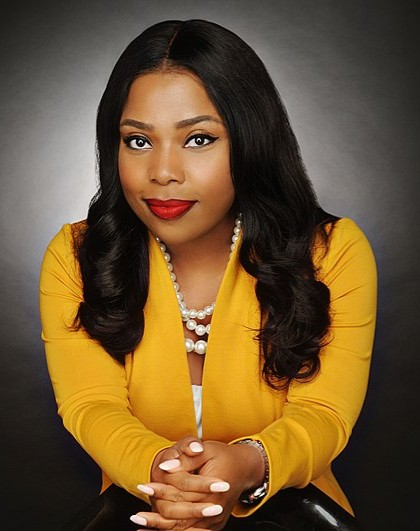
Nominee	Katrina Robinson
Party	Democratic
Popular vote	42,992
Percentage	100%
Senator before election
Reginald Tate
Democratic
Elected Senator
Katrina Robinson
Democratic

On January 29, 2018, Robinson announced that she would run in the Democratic primary. She defeated incumbent Senator Reginald Tate in the Democratic primary and faced no opposition in the general election. Tate had been censured by the Shelby County Democratic Party and Robinson was endorsed by United States Representative Steve Cohen and Senate Minority Leader Sara Kyle.

=== Democratic primary ===
Democratic primary
Party	Candidate	Votes	%
Democratic	Katrina Robinson	14,164	68.66
Democratic	Reginald Tate (incumbent)	6,464	31.34
Total votes		20,628	100

=== General election ===
Tennessee's 33rd State Senate District general election, 2018
Party	Candidate	Votes	%
Democratic	Katrina Robinson	42,992	100
Total votes		42,992	100

== See also ==
- 2018 Tennessee elections
- 2018 Tennessee House of Representatives election
