= 2002 Tennessee Senate election =

- November 5, 2002

17 of the 33 seats in the Tennessee State Senate 17 seats needed for a majority
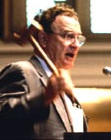

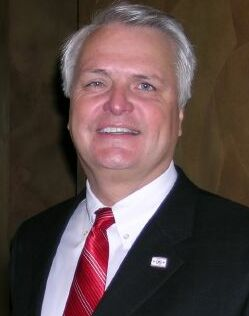
	Majority party	Minority party
Leader	John Shelton Wilder	Ron Ramsey
Party	Democratic	Republican
Leader's seat	26th district	4th district
Seats before	18	15
Seats won	18	15
Seat change	Steady	Steady
Popular vote	332,487	412,490
Percentage	44.04%	54.27%
- Democratic gain Republican gain Republican hold Democratic hold No Election 50–60% 60–70% >90% 50–60% 60–70% >90%
Speaker before election
John Shelton Wilder
Democratic
Elected Speaker
John Shelton Wilder
Democratic

The 2002 Tennessee State Senate election was held on Tuesday November 5, 2002, to determine which party would control the Tennessee Senate for the following two years in the 103rd Tennessee General Assembly. The seventeen odd-numbered districts of the 33 seat Tennessee Senate were up for election.

Prior to the election 18 seats were held by Democrats and 15 were held by Republicans. Primary elections were held on August 1, 2002. The general election saw both parties holding on to the same amount of seats as the previous election, meaning that Democrats retained control of the Tennessee Senate.

== Retirements ==
Two incumbent Republicans did not run for re-election in 2002. Those incumbents were:

1. District 13: Gene Elsea retired.
2. District 23: Marsha Blackburn retired to successfully run for the U.S. House of Representatives for Tennessee's 7th congressional district.

== Incumbents defeated ==
=== In the primary election ===
==== Republicans ====
1. District 1: Tommy Haun (R) lost renomination to Steve Southerland.

==== Democrats ====
1. District 17: Robert Rochelle (D) lost renomination to Sherry Fisher.

=== In the general election ===
==== Republicans ====
1. District 27: Bobby Carter (R) lost re-election to Don McLeary.

== Predictions ==
Source	Ranking	As of
Cook Political Report	Lean D	October 4, 2002

== Results summary ==
Party	Candidates	Votes		Seats				
Party	Candidates	No.	%	Before	Up	Won	After	+/–
Democratic	14	332,487	44.04%	18	7	7	18	Steady
Republican	14	412,490	54.27%	15	10	10	15	Steady
Independent	4	10,004	1.33%	0	0	0	0	Steady
Total		754,981	100.00%	33			33	Steady

Popular vote
Republican	54.27%
Democratic	44.04%
Other	1.33%

Senate seats
Democratic	54.55%
Republican	45.45%

=== Closest races ===
Three races were decided by a margin of under 10%:

District	Winner	Margin
District 17	Republican (gain)	5.60%
District 13	Republican	8.42%
District 27	Democratic (gain)	8.76%

== Results by district ==
District	Democratic		Republican		Others		Total		Result
District	Votes	%	Votes	%	Votes	%	Votes	%	Result
District 1	–	–	25,111	100.00%	–	–	25,111	100.00%	Republican hold
District 3	8,129	19.30%	30,758	73.03%	3,232	7.67%	42,119	100.00%	Republican hold
District 5	18,636	34.52%	35,345	65.48%	–	–	53,981	100.00%	Republican hold
District 7	17,210	38.09%	26,812	59.34%	1,159	2.57%	45,181	100.00%	Republican hold
District 9	17,282	39.75%	26,195	60.25%	–	–	43,477	100.00%	Republican hold
District 11	–	–	41,443	100.00%	–	–	41,443	100.00%	Republican hold
District 13	22,769	45.79%	26,960	54.21%	–	–	49,729	100.00%	Republican hold
District 15	30,942	58.11%	21,691	40.74%	614	1.15%	53,247	100.00%	Democratic hold
District 17	25,592	47.20%	28,624	52.80%	–	–	54,216	100.00%	Republican gain
District 19	27,872	100.00%	–	–	–	–	27,872	100.00%	Democratic hold
District 21	32,708	63.42%	18,865	36.58%	–	–	51,573	100.00%	Democratic hold
District 23	–	–	55,870	100.00%	–	–	55,870	100.00%	Republican hold
District 25	28,677	62.94%	16,887	37.06%	–	–	45,564	100.00%	Democratic hold
District 27	27,706	54.62%	23,018	45.38%	–	–	50,724	100.00%	Democratic gain
District 29	27,480	100.00%	–	–	–	–	27,480	100.00%	Democratic hold
District 31	11,186	21.89%	34,911	68.32%	4,999	9.79%	51,096	100.00%	Republican hold
District 33	36,298	100.00%	–	–	–	–	36,298	100.00%	Democratic hold

== Candidates and results ==
=== District 1 ===
==== Republican primary ====
Republican primary
Party	Candidate	Votes	%
Republican	Steve Southerland	14,232	56.98%
Republican	Tommy Haun (incumbent)	10,746	43.02%
Total votes		24,978	100.00%

==== General election ====
Tennessee's 1st State Senate District General Election, 2002
Party	Candidate	Votes	%
Republican	Steve Southerland	25,111	100.00%
Total votes		25,111	100.00%
Republican hold			

=== District 3 ===
==== Republican primary ====
Republican primary
Party	Candidate	Votes	%
Republican	Rusty Crowe (incumbent)	14,153	60.57%
Republican	Kevin D. Cole	9,212	39.43%
Total votes		23,365	100.00%

==== Democratic primary ====
Democratic primary
Party	Candidate	Votes	%
Democratic	Richard Dale Gabriel	3,656	100.00%
Total votes		3,656	100.00%

==== General election ====
Tennessee's 3rd State Senate District General Election, 2002
Party	Candidate	Votes	%
Republican	Rusty Crowe (incumbent)	30,758	73.03%
Democratic	Richard Dale Gabriel	8,129	19.30%
Independent	Charlie Mattioli	3,232	7.67%
Total votes		42,119	100.00%
Republican hold			

=== District 5 ===
==== Republican primary ====
Republican primary
Party	Candidate	Votes	%
Republican	Randy McNally (incumbent)	11,692	50.92%
Republican	Lee Frank	11,271	49.08%
Total votes		22,963	100.00%

==== Democratic primary ====
Democratic primary
Party	Candidate	Votes	%
Democratic	Gary Farmer	11,591	100.00%
Total votes		11,591	100.00%

==== General election ====
Tennessee's 5th State Senate District General Election, 2002
Party	Candidate	Votes	%
Republican	Randy McNally (incumbent)	35,345	65.48%
Democratic	Gary Farmer	18,636	34.52%
Total votes		53,981	100.00%
Republican hold			

=== District 7 ===
==== Republican primary ====
Republican primary
Party	Candidate	Votes	%
Republican	Tim Burchett (incumbent)	13,250	100.00%
Total votes		13,250	100.00%

==== Democratic primary ====
Democratic primary
Party	Candidate	Votes	%
Democratic	Bill Owen	6,027	79.41%
Democratic	Kendall Gene Wells	1,562	20.59%
Total votes		7,589	100.00%

==== General election ====
Tennessee's 7th State Senate District General Election, 2002
Party	Candidate	Votes	%
Republican	Tim Burchett (incumbent)	26,812	59.34%
Democratic	Bill Owen	17,210	38.09%
Independent	Joe Burchfield	1,159	2.57%
Total votes		45,181	100.00%
Republican hold			

=== District 9 ===
==== Republican primary ====
Republican primary
Party	Candidate	Votes	%
Republican	Jeff Miller (incumbent)	9,953	48.85%
Republican	Calvin Rockholt	6,950	34.11%
Republican	Hal Y. Roe	3,470	17.04%
Total votes		20,373	100.00%

==== Democratic primary ====
Democratic primary
Party	Candidate	Votes	%
Democratic	Ronald D. Moore	5,655	66.60%
Democratic	Charles S. Heron Jr.	2,836	33.40%
Total votes		8,491	100.00%

==== General election ====
Tennessee's 9th State Senate District General Election, 2002
Party	Candidate	Votes	%
Republican	Jeff Miller (incumbent)	26,195	60.25%
Democratic	Ronald D. Moore	17,282	39.75%
Total votes		43,477	100.00%
Republican hold			

=== District 11 ===
==== Republican primary ====
Republican primary
Party	Candidate	Votes	%
Republican	David Fowler (incumbent)	15,913	100.00%
Total votes		15,913	100.00%

==== General election ====
Tennessee's 11th State Senate District General Election, 2002
Party	Candidate	Votes	%
Republican	David Fowler (incumbent)	41,443	100.00%
Total votes		41,443	100.00%
Republican hold			

=== District 13 ===
==== Republican primary ====
Republican primary
Party	Candidate	Votes	%
Republican	Bill Ketron	6,811	53.54%
Republican	Alan Pedigo	5,910	46.46%
Total votes		12,721	100.00%

==== Democratic primary ====
Democratic primary
Party	Candidate	Votes	%
Democratic	Bobby Sands	13,043	100.00%
Total votes		13,043	100.00%

==== General election ====
Tennessee's 13th State Senate District General Election, 2002
Party	Candidate	Votes	%
Republican	Bill Ketron	26,960	54.21%
Democratic	Ronald D. Moore	22,769	45.79%
Total votes		49,729	100.00%
Republican hold			

=== District 15 ===
==== Republican primary ====
Republican primary
Party	Candidate	Votes	%
Republican	Paul Bailey	10,848	100.00%
Total votes		10,848	100.00%

==== Democratic primary ====
Democratic primary
Party	Candidate	Votes	%
Democratic	Charlotte Burks (incumbent)	23,614	100.00%
Total votes		23,614	100.00%

==== General election ====
Tennessee's 15th State Senate District General Election, 2002
Party	Candidate	Votes	%
Democratic	Charlotte Burks (incumbent)	30,942	58.11%
Republican	Paul Bailey	21,691	40.74%
Independent	Robert E. Grubb	614	1.15%
Total votes		53,247	100.00%
Democratic hold			

=== District 17 ===
==== Republican primary ====
Republican primary
Party	Candidate	Votes	%
Republican	Mae Beavers	13,159	100.00%
Total votes		13,159	100.00%

==== Democratic primary ====
Democratic primary
Party	Candidate	Votes	%
Democratic	Sherry Fisher	9,883	58.56%
Democratic	Robert Rochelle (incumbent)	6,993	41.44%
Total votes		16,876	100.00%

==== General election ====
Tennessee's 17th State Senate District General Election, 2002
Party	Candidate	Votes	%
Republican	Mae Beavers	28,624	52.80%
Democratic	Sherry Fisher	25,592	47.20%
Total votes		54,216	100.00%
Republican gain from Democratic			

=== District 19 ===
==== Democratic primary ====
Democratic primary
Party	Candidate	Votes	%
Democratic	Thelma Harper (incumbent)	14,798	100.00%
Total votes		14,798	100.00%

==== General election ====
Tennessee's 19th State Senate District General Election, 2002
Party	Candidate	Votes	%
Democratic	Thelma Harper (incumbent)	27,872	100.00%
Total votes		27,872	100.00%
Democratic hold			

=== District 21 ===
==== Republican primary ====
Republican primary
Party	Candidate	Votes	%
Republican	Tom Alexander	9,138	100.00%
Total votes		9,138	100.00%

==== Democratic primary ====
Democratic primary
Party	Candidate	Votes	%
Democratic	Douglas Henry (incumbent)	11,669	60.95%
Democratic	Jeff Wilson	7,476	39.05%
Total votes		19,145	100.00%

==== General election ====
Tennessee's 21st State Senate District General Election, 2002
Party	Candidate	Votes	%
Democratic	Douglas Henry (incumbent)	32,708	63.42%
Republican	Tom Alexander	18,865	36.58%
Total votes		51,573	100.00%
Democratic hold			

=== District 23 ===
==== Republican primary ====
Republican primary
Party	Candidate	Votes	%
Republican	Jim Bryson	11,510	48.91%
Republican	Clint Callicott	9,882	41.99%
Republican	Laban Samuel Defriese	2,141	9.10%
Total votes		23,533	100.00%

==== General election ====
Tennessee's 23rd State Senate District General Election, 2002
Party	Candidate	Votes	%
Republican	Jim Bryson	55,870	100.00%
Total votes		55,870	100.00%
Republican hold			

=== District 25 ===
==== Republican primary ====
Republican primary
Party	Candidate	Votes	%
Republican	James F. Brasfield	9,679	100.00%
Total votes		9,679	100.00%

==== Democratic primary ====
Democratic primary
Party	Candidate	Votes	%
Democratic	Douglas S. Jackson (incumbent)	19,992	100.00%
Total votes		19,992	100.00%

==== General election ====
Tennessee's 25th State Senate District General Election, 2002
Party	Candidate	Votes	%
Democratic	Douglas S. Jackson (incumbent)	28,677	62.94%
Republican	James F. Brasfield	16,887	37.06%
Total votes		45,564	100.00%
Democratic hold			

=== District 27 ===
==== Republican primary ====
Republican primary
Party	Candidate	Votes	%
Republican	Bobby Carter (incumbent)	12,389	100.00%
Total votes		12,389	100.00%

==== Democratic primary ====
Democratic primary
Party	Candidate	Votes	%
Democratic	Don McLeary	9,088	52.50%
Democratic	Alex J. Leech	6,801	39.29%
Democratic	Harold T. Smith	1,422	8.21%
Total votes		17,311	100.00%

==== General election ====
Tennessee's 27th State Senate District General Election, 2002
Party	Candidate	Votes	%
Democratic	Don McLeary	27,706	54.62%
Republican	Bobby Carter (incumbent)	23,018	45.38%
Total votes		50,724	100.00%
Democratic gain from Republican			

=== District 29 ===
==== Democratic primary ====
Democratic primary
Party	Candidate	Votes	%
Democratic	John Ford (incumbent)	17,397	78.15%
Democratic	Richard B. Fields	4,863	21.85%
Total votes		22,260	100.00%

==== General election ====
Tennessee's 29th State Senate District General Election, 2002
Party	Candidate	Votes	%
Democratic	John Ford (incumbent)	27,480	100.00%
Total votes		27,480	100.00%
Democratic hold			

=== District 31 ===
==== Republican primary ====
Republican primary
Party	Candidate	Votes	%
Republican	Curtis S. Person Jr. (incumbent)	24,739	100.00%
Total votes		24,739	100.00%

==== Democratic primary ====
Democratic primary
Party	Candidate	Votes	%
Democratic	Anthony D'Agostino	24,739	100.00%
Total votes		24,739	100.00%

==== General election ====
Tennessee's 31st State Senate District General Election, 2002
Party	Candidate	Votes	%
Republican	Curtis S. Person Jr. (incumbent)	34,911	68.32%
Democratic	Anthony D'Agostino	11,186	21.89%
Independent	Barbara Leding	4,999	9.79%
Total votes		51,096	100.00%
Republican hold			

=== District 33 ===
==== Democratic primary ====
Democratic primary
Party	Candidate	Votes	%
Democratic	Roscoe Dixon (incumbent)	24,170	100.00%
Total votes		24,170	100.00%

==== General election ====
Tennessee's 33rd State Senate District General Election, 2002
Party	Candidate	Votes	%
Democratic	Roscoe Dixon (incumbent)	36,298	100.00%
Total votes		36,298	100.00%
Democratic hold			

== See also ==
- 2002 Tennessee elections
- 2002 Tennessee gubernatorial election
- 2002 Tennessee House of Representatives election
