= Kathryn I. Bowers =

American politician (1943–2015)

Member of the Tennessee Senate from the 33rd district
- In office May 3, 2005 – January 9, 2007
- Preceded by: Sidney Chism
- Succeeded by: Reginald Tate

Member of the Tennessee House of Representatives from the 87th district
- In office January 10, 1995 – May 3, 2005
- Preceded by: Roscoe Dixon
- Succeeded by: Gary Rowe

Personal details
- Born: May 2, 1943
- Died: May 13, 2015 (aged 72)
- Party: Democratic
- Children: 2
- Education: Memphis State University
- Website: House website

Kathryn Inez Bowers (May 2, 1943 – May 13, 2015) was an American Democratic politician and member of the Tennessee General Assembly who left office after being implicated in the Tennessee Waltz corruption scandal.

She served as a member of the Tennessee House of Representatives in the 99th through 104th General Assemblies; during the 103rd General Assembly, she was the House Majority Whip. In 2005, during the 104th General Assembly, she became a member of the Tennessee Senate, serving through 2006.

== Biography ==
Kathryn Bowers graduated from Hamilton High School in Memphis in 1960. She obtained an associate's degree from Griggs Business College in 1962 and attended the Memphis State University School of Journalism from 1970 to 1972. She was President of Women Action for New Direction (WAND) from 1999 until 2003. She worked as a contractor business consultant and was a one-time state director for Women in Government. From May 2003 until June 2005, Bowers served as Chairman of the Shelby County Democratic Executive Committee.

== Tennessee House of Representatives ==
Bowers became a member of the Tennessee House of Representatives in 1995 and served in the House in the 99th through 104th General Assemblies. During the 103rd General Assembly, she was the House Majority Whip. In 2005 she moved to the Tennessee Senate to fill an unexpired term representing the 33rd district, which was composed of part of Shelby County.

She was sworn in as a Senator on May 3, 2005, replacing Senator Sidney Chism, who had been elected to the post on an interim basis by the Shelby County Commission as a replacement for Roscoe Dixon, who resigned on January 13 of that year. She served on the Senate Government Operations Committee, on the Senate Commerce, Labor & Agriculture Committee, on the Senate Environment and Conservation Committee, and on the Joint Tenncare Oversight Committee.

== Operation Tennessee Waltz ==
In 2005, she was indicted on charges of corruption as a result of Operation Tennessee Waltz. She rejected a plea bargain she was offered in 2006. In the August 3, 2006, primary, she had won the Democratic nomination for another term in the Tennessee Senate, but shortly thereafter she announced the abandonment of her re-election campaign for "health reasons." According to a September 1, 2006, story in The Commercial Appeal, Bowers was arrested for suspicion of DUI in Memphis the previous day.

On July 16, 2007, she pleaded guilty to one count of bribery in exchange for the prosecution's agreement to drop five charges of extortion, each of which could have carried a twenty-year sentence. In her plea bargain, she admitted she split a $11,500 bribe with an accomplice who was her contact with FBI agents impersonating crooked businessmen. Her plea carried the risk of a sentence of as much as ten years and a $250,000 fine, although federal sentencing guidelines suggest leniency for first-time offenders.

As of mid-July 2007, Operation Tennessee Waltz had produced indictments against eleven individuals and, including Bowers, convictions for ten of them. The remaining individual, a former member of the Memphis school board, had not yet gone to trial. Prosecutors said that Bowers was one of the first corrupt officials identified, and that she helped them make contact with other legislators.

== Personal life ==
Bowers was divorced with two daughters. She lived in Memphis, Tennessee. Bowers died on May 14, 2015, at the age of 72.
