= Senator Bunch =

Senator Bunch may refer to:

- Dewayne Bunch (Tennessee politician) (born 1959), Tennessee State Senate
- Samuel Bunch (1786–1849), Tennessee State Senate
