= Don McLeary =

American football coach and politician (born 1948)

Biographical details
- Born: January 2, 1948 (age 78); Humboldt, Tennessee, U.S.

Playing career
- 1968–1970: Tennessee
- Position: Running back

Coaching career (HC unless noted)
- 1972: White Station HS (TN)
- 1973–1975: Morehead State (LB/WR/RB)
- 1976–1977: Ottawa (KS)
- 1978–1982: Kansas (assistant)
- 1984–1985: Los Angeles Express (WR/ST)
- 1986–1996: Tennessee–Martin

Head coaching record
- Overall: 60–81
- Tournaments: 1–1 (NCAA D-II playoffs)

Accomplishments and honors

Awards
- Gulf South Coach of The Year (1988)

Records

Member of the Tennessee Senate from the 27th district
- In office January 14, 2003 – January 9, 2007
- Preceded by: Bobby Carter
- Succeeded by: Lowe Finney

Personal details
- Party: Republican
- Other political affiliations: Democratic (until 2006)
- Education: University of Tennessee (BS, MS)

Howard Donald McLeary (born January 2, 1948) is an American politician and former college football player and coach. He was a member of the Tennessee Senate representing the 27th district, which is composed of Madison, Gibson, and Carroll counties.

== Early life and education ==
Born in Humboldt, Tennessee, McLeary attended North Side High School in nearby Jackson. McLeary then attended the University of Tennessee and played on the Tennessee Volunteers football team at running back from 1968 to 1970. At Tennessee, McLeary rushed for 907 yards and 10 touchdowns and added 198 yards and one touchdown on receiving. McLeary graduated from Tennessee with a B.S. in physical education in 1970 and M.S. in educational administration in 1972.

== Coaching career ==
McLeary's first coaching job was as head coach at White Station High School in Memphis, Tennessee in 1972.

In 1973, McLeary became linebackers coach at Morehead State.

McLeary was head coach at Ottawa University in Ottawa, Kansas from 1976 to 1977. He was then an assistant coach at Kansas from 1978 to 1982.

From 1984 to 1985, McLeary was special teams coordinator and wide receivers coach for the Los Angeles Express of the United States Football League.

From 1986 to 1996, Don McLeary was the head football coach for the University of Tennessee at Martin. He is the third winningest coach in UT Martin history, leading UT Martin to a shared Gulf South Conference Championship and the NCAA Division II Quarterfinals. He was inducted into the UT Martin Athletics Hall of Fame in October 2006.

== Head coaching record ==
Year	Team	Overall	Conference	Standing	Bowl/playoffs
Ottawa Braves (Heart of America Athletic Conference) (1976–1977)
1976	Ottawa	5–4	3–3	T–3rd	
1977	Ottawa	5–4	3–3	T–4th	
Ottawa:		10–8	6–6		
Tennessee–Martin Pacers (Gulf South Conference) (1986–1990)
1986	Tennessee–Martin	3–8	2–6	T–6th	
1987	Tennessee–Martin	5–6	3–5	8th	
1988	Tennessee–Martin	11–2	7–1	T–1st	L NCAA Division II Quarterfinal
1989	Tennessee–Martin	2–9	1–7	9th	
1990	Tennessee–Martin	4–7	2–6	7th	
Tennessee–Martin Pacers (NCAA Division II independent) (1991)
1991	Tennessee–Martin	5–6			
Tennessee–Martin Pacers/Skyhawks (Ohio Valley Conference) (1992–1996)
1992	Tennessee–Martin	3–8	2–6	T–6th	
1993	Tennessee–Martin	6–5	5–3	3rd	
1994	Tennessee–Martin	5–6	2–6	8th	
1995	Tennessee–Martin	5–6	4–4	5th	
1996	Tennessee–Martin	1–10	1–7	T–8th	
Tennessee–Martin:		50–73	29–51		
Total:		60–81			
National championship Conference title Conference division title or championship game berth

== Business career ==
After leaving coaching, McLeary became an investment executive and has served on the boards of both the American Cancer Society and the American Heart Association.

== Political career ==
Don McLeary won the 2002 general election as a Democrat to the Tennessee General Assembly for a four-year term over Republican incumbent Bobby Carter. In February 2006, McLeary switched his party affiliation to the Republican Party.

Don McLeary served as the vice chair of the Senate Transportation Committee. He was also a member of the Senate State and Local Government Committee as well as the Lottery Information and Recommendation Committee, Select Committee on Education, and Government Operations Committee.

In the 2006 general election, Don McLeary was defeated by 477 votes in a huge upset by Democratic opponent Lowe Finney. In 2010, McLeary lost to Finney again, receiving 24,563 votes to Finney's 25,774.

=== Political views ===
McLeary co-sponsored Senate Joint Resolution 31 in 2005 to put on the November 2006 gubernatorial election ballot a proposed amendment to the Constitution of Tennessee to ban gay marriage. He was also one of 24 state senators to favor putting on the ballot a proposal to remove any guarantees to the right to an abortion from the state constitution. The proposal later failed to pass a panel in Tennessee House of Representatives.

After holding a town hall meeting, McLeary proposed legislation that would direct the Tennessee Commissioner of Commerce and Insurance to develop a proposal to create an insurance pool to provide full coverage to residential and commercial property owners that are unable to obtain insurance coverage following widespread cancellation after a natural disaster. The bill, passed in April 2004, was co-sponsored by Roscoe Dixon in the state senate and by Johnny Shaw and Jimmy Eldridge in the House.
