= Tennessee House of Representatives 23rd district =

State legislative district in Tennessee

Tennessee's 23rd State House of Representatives district
- Map of Tennessee House districts with the 23rd District shaded in red
Representative
Mark Cochran; R–Englewood
since 2019
- Demographics: 87% White; 2.6% Black; 3.9% Hispanic; 0.7% Asian; 5.5% Multiracial
- Population (2024): 68,241

The Tennessee House of Representatives 23rd district is one of the 99 legislative districts in the lower house of the Tennessee General Assembly. The district is located in East Tennessee and covers McMinn and the south of Monroe counties. The district includes Athens, Englewood, Tellico Plains, and Etowah. The rest of the district is unincorporated and mostly rural. Mark Cochran has represented the district since 2019.

== Demographics ==
The Tennessee Comptroller estimates the population as of 2024 at 68,241.

- 87% of the district is White
- 3.9% of the district is Hispanic
- 2.6% of the district is Black
- 0.7% of the district is Asian
- 5.5% of the district is Two or more races

Detailed demographic information is also available through Census Reporter.

== History ==
The 88th Tennessee General Assembly was the first in which all districts were numbered. At this time, the 23rd district was in McMinn and Bradley counties. From the 94th-97th GAs, it was part of McMinn and Meigs counties. Since the 98th General Assembly, it has been composed of McMinn and part of Monroe counties.

== List of Representatives ==
Representative	Party	Years of Service	General Assembly	Hometown
Mark Cochran	Republican	2019-present	111th-114th	Englewood
John Forgety	Republican	2011-2018	107th-110th	Athens
Mike Bell	Republican	2007-2010	105th-106th	Riceville
Robert McKee	Republican	1991-2006	97th-104th	Niota
Clyde B. Webb	Republican	1971-1990	87th-96th	Athens
