= Don Arnold =

Don Arnold may refer to:

- Donald Arnold (1935–2021), Canadian rower
- Don Arnold (politician) (1942–2024), American politician from Tennessee
