= Don Arnold (politician) =

American politician (1942–2024)

Mayor of Johnson City, Tennessee
- In office 1977–1978

Member of the Tennessee Senate from the 3rd district
- In office 1987–1991
- Succeeded by: Rusty Crowe

Personal details
- Born: July 31, 1942 Bristol, Tennessee, U.S.
- Died: January 15, 2024 (aged 81) Johnson City, Tennessee, U.S.
- Party: Republican
- Education: East Tennessee State University; University of Tennessee College of Law

Don Arnold (July 31, 1942 – January 15, 2024) was an American politician. He served as a Republican member for the 3rd district of the Tennessee Senate.

== Life and career ==
Arnold was born in Bristol, Tennessee. He attended East Tennessee State University and the University of Tennessee College of Law. He worked as a lawyer.

Arnold was mayor of Johnson City, Tennessee from 1977 to 1978. He then served in the Tennessee Senate from 1987 to 1991, representing the 3rd district. Afterward, he was a county judge.

Arnold and his wife, Linda, had three children. He died at a care home in Johnson City on January 15, 2024, at the age of 81.
