= Joe McKnight (politician) =

American politician

Member of the Tennessee Senate from the 27th district
- In office 1987–1995
- Succeeded by: Bobby Carter

Personal details
- Born: December 4, 1933 Jackson, Tennessee, U.S.
- Died: February 20, 2023 (aged 89)
- Education: Memphis State University; University of Tennessee-Martin

Joe "Nip" McKnight (December 4, 1933 – February 20, 2023) was an American politician who represented Tennessee's 27th district in the state senate from 1987–1995.

== Early life ==
McKnight grew up in Bemis, Tennessee, a company town run by the Bemis Company that merged into the city of Jackson in 1977. His father, a former college basketball player at University of Tennessee-Martin, taught McKnight the game at a young age. He continued playing throughout high school and college, first for Memphis State University before transferring to UT-Martin, where McKnight broke his father's scoring record. After graduation, McKnight taught at South Side High School in Jackson for two years. He was then hired by Martin-Marietta Ammunition of Milan and served as the company's production superintendent for sixteen years.

== Political career ==
McKnight served as Madison County commissioner for eight years prior to winning the 1986 state senate election. He defeated Bobby Carter in the tight 1990 election, but lost to Carter four years later.

== Personal ==
McKnight married Sandra Maddox in 1960.

McKnight died on February 20, 2023.
