= John Forgety =

American politician (born 1946)

- Forgety in 2017

Member of the Tennessee House of Representatives from the 23rd district
- In office January 11, 2011 – January 8, 2019
- Preceded by: Mike Bell
- Succeeded by: Mark Cochran

Personal details
- Born: March 28, 1946 (age 80) Knoxville, Tennessee, U.S.
- Party: Republican
- Spouse: Faye Forgety
- Children: 2
- Education: Maryville College (BS); Tennessee Tech University (MA, EdS); Nova University (EdD)
- Website: House website

John W. Forgety (born March 28, 1946) is an American politician who is a former member of the Tennessee House of Representatives. He served as a Republican and represented the 23rd district, including McMinn County and parts of Monroe County.

== Biography ==
Forgety is a native of Knoxville, Tennessee. He was a school administrator for forty years and served in the Tennessee Army National Guard for twenty years along with deploying to Iraq in 2004 to 2005. In 2011, he was elected as a Republican Representative for the 23rd district, a seat formerly represented by now-Senator Mike Bell. Regarding education, he has said he is critical of student evaluations. He is the President of the Athens chapter of the Kiwanis.

Forgety is married with two children. He is a Baptist. He lives in Athens, Tennessee with his wife, Faye.
