= Edith Taylor Langster =

American politician (1949–2024)

Member of the Tennessee House of Representatives from the 54th district
- In office January 10, 1995 – January 9, 2007
- Preceded by: Harold M. Love Sr.
- Succeeded by: Brenda Gilmore

Personal details
- Born: January 31, 1949 Painesville, Ohio, U.S.
- Died: June 30, 2024 (aged 75) Nashville, Tennessee, U.S.
- Party: Democratic
- Children: 2
- Education: Tennessee State University (BS)
- Website: House website

Edith Taylor Langster (January 31, 1949 – June 30, 2024) was an American politician who served in the Tennessee House of Representatives from the 54th district from 1995 to 2007.

She died on June 30, 2024, in Nashville, Tennessee at age 75.
