= Matt Kisber =

American politician (born 1960)

Member of the Tennessee House of Representatives from the 73rd district
- In office 1982 – 2002
- Preceded by: Ken Baker
- Succeeded by: Jimmy Eldridge

Personal details
- Born: January 31, 1960 (age 66) Jackson, Tennessee, U.S.
- Party: Democratic
- Spouse: Paige Lowe Kisber
- Education: Vanderbilt University
- Profession: Businessman

Matthew Harris Kisber (born January 31, 1960) is a businessman and Democratic politician in the U.S. state of Tennessee who served ten two-year terms in the Tennessee House of Representatives and was Commissioner of the Tennessee Department of Economic and Community Development during the governorship of Phil Bredesen.

== Early life and education ==
Kisber was born January 31, 1960, in Jackson, Tennessee, and grew up there. His grandfather, Jonas Kisber, Sr, owned and operated Kisber's Department Stores in Jackson. Matt's dad is Jonas Jr; and was prominent in the city's small Jewish community. Matt Kisber started working in his family's department store when he was 12 years old. While attending Vanderbilt University, where he earned a bachelor's degree in political science, he worked as a photojournalist for the Jackson Sun newspaper.

== Tennessee House of Representatives ==
In the 1982 general election, Kisber defeated two-term Republican incumbent Ken Baker. Kisber would then serve ten consecutive two-year terms before leaving office voluntarily in November 2002. During his years in the state legislature, he served as chairman of the House Finance, Ways and Means Committee, as well as special joint committees of the House and Senate that considered matters related to business taxation, electricity deregulation, and workers' compensation. He also headed a National Conference of State Legislatures committee that studied the streamlining of state sales tax administration.

He had several major legislative accomplishments in the area of economic development. In 1993, he was a leader in achieving the passage of a bill that established a program of tax credits for Tennessee companies that expand or create new jobs in the state. In 1996, he advocated successful legislative initiative to reform workers’ compensation in the state, including establishing a workers’ compensation fraud unit in the Tennessee Bureau of Investigation. In 1998, he was author and co-sponsor of a bill that established a program of employment training grants for companies that provide highly skilled and high-paying technology and manufacturing jobs.

While serving as a part-time legislator, Kisber was employed by First Tennessee Bank, where he held the position of vice president of business development as of 2003.

== Tennessee Department of Economic and Community Development ==
In January 2003, Kisber was appointed Commissioner of the Tennessee Department of Economic and Community Development by newly elected Tennessee Governor Phil Bredesen. He took up this state cabinet position on January 18, 2003, and served through January 15, 2011, when Bredesen left office. In 2009, he was recognized by the National Coalition for Capital Formation as a "Champion of Small Business". That same year, Southern Business & Development Magazine included Kisber in a list of "Ten People Who Made A Difference".

== Post-government career ==
As of 2013, Kisber is president and chief executive officer of Silicon Ranch Corporation, a developer and operator of solar energy facilities. In 2018, Kisber facilitated a deal with Royal Dutch Shell in which the company took over the 44% minority interest previously held by Partners Group.
