= Mark Cochran =

American politician (born 1985)

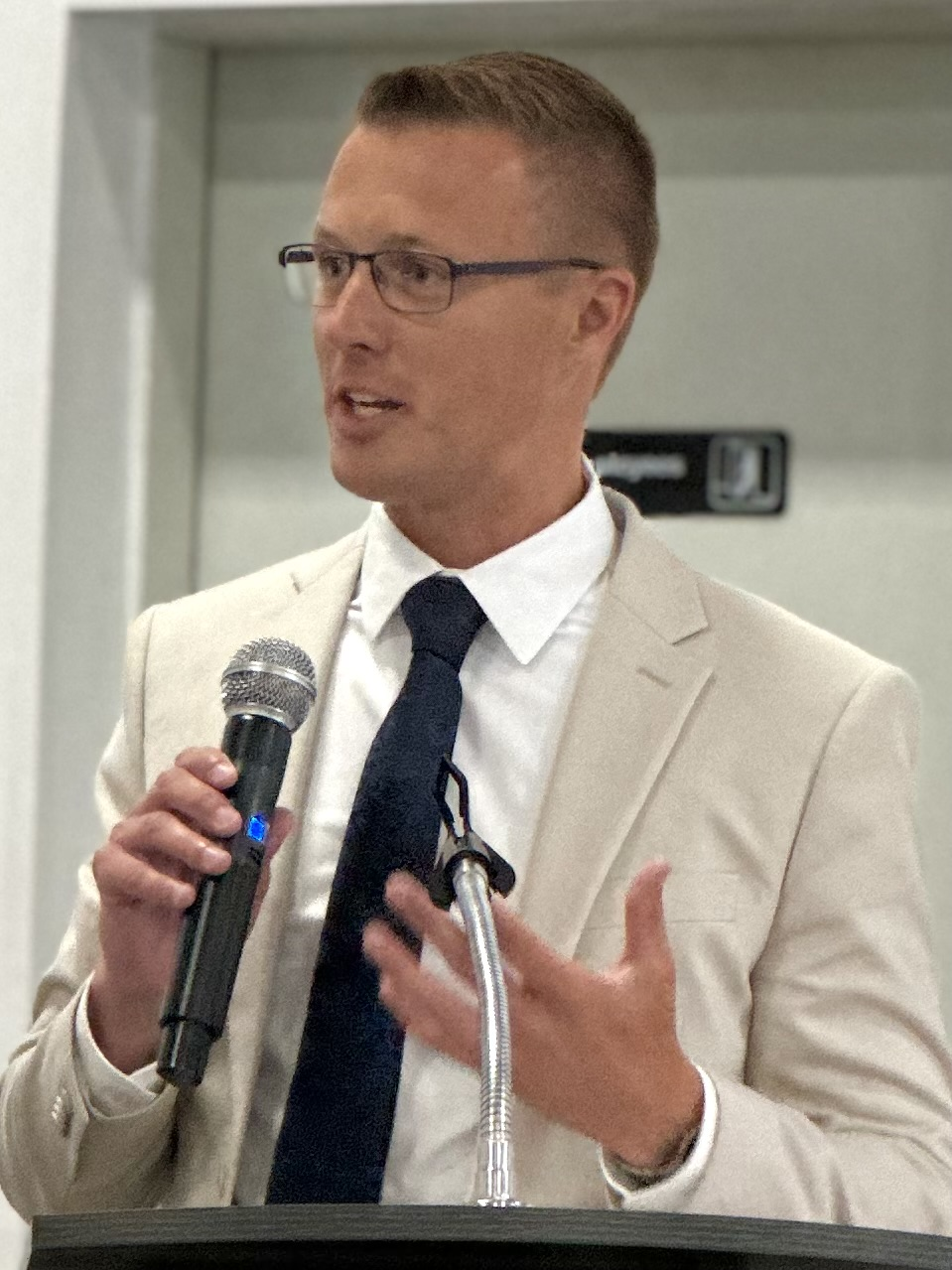
- Cochran in 2024

Member of the Tennessee House of Representatives from the 23th district
- Incumbent
- Assumed office January 8, 2019
- Preceded by: John Forgety

Personal details
- Born: November 21, 1985 (age 40)
- Party: Republican
- Education: University of Tennessee (BS, MPA)
- Website: House website

Mark Cochran (born November 21, 1985) is an American politician. A member of the Republican Party, he represents the 23rd district in the Tennessee House of Representatives. He was elected as part of the 111th General Assembly in November 2018. He was preceded by Republican representative John W. Forgety. The 23rd district encompasses McMinn County and parts of Monroe County. Cochran began serving as the treasurer for the Tennessee State House of Representatives in 2019.

== Early life ==
Cochran's family roots in the town of Englewood, Tennessee date back seven generations to the 1850s when his ancestors established a small farm. He grew up tending cattle and bagging groceries in his parents' store. He is a devout Christian and conservative.

From 2004-2008, Cochran attended the University of Tennessee in Knoxville where he earned a master's degree in public administration with a grade point average of 4.0. Following this, he remained at the University of Tennessee for one more year, to 2009, to earn a bachelor's in broadcast journalism, continuing to maintain a 4.0 GPA.

== Career ==
In 2010, Cochran worked as a staff assistant in the office of former senator Bob Corker who held office from 2007-2019. Also starting in 2010, he became an assistant to the McMinn County Mayor's Office. In 2015 he served as the campaign manager for Jason Zachary who ran for state representative for the 14th district and defeated Scott Hacker with 72.9% or the vote. As of 2015 Cochran also served as a board member on the Board of Funeral Directors and Embalmers.

In 2023, Cochran supported a resolution to expel three Democratic lawmakers from the legislature for violating decorum rules. The expulsion was widely characterized as unprecedented.

=== 2018 Election ===
In the general election for District 23 of the Tennessee House of Representatives, Mark Cochran (R) defeated Brad Hartley (D).

General Election for District 23 TN House of Representatives
Candidate	%	Votes
Mark Cochran (R)	80.7	16,395
Brad Hartley (D)	19.3	3,918
Total	100	20,313

Preceding the general election, on August 2, 2018, Cochran won the Republican primary election against Donald Winder III for Tennessee House of Representatives District 23.

Republican Primary for District 23 TN House of Representatives
	Mark Cochran	Donald Winder III
McMinn	4,198	3,367
Monroe	1,822	849
Total	6,020	4,216

== Committees ==
Cochran presently is a member on the following legislative committees: Education, Curriculum (Testing, and Innovation Subcommittees), Consumer and Human Resource Committee, (Consumer Subcommittee).
