= Bo Watson =

American politician (born 1960)

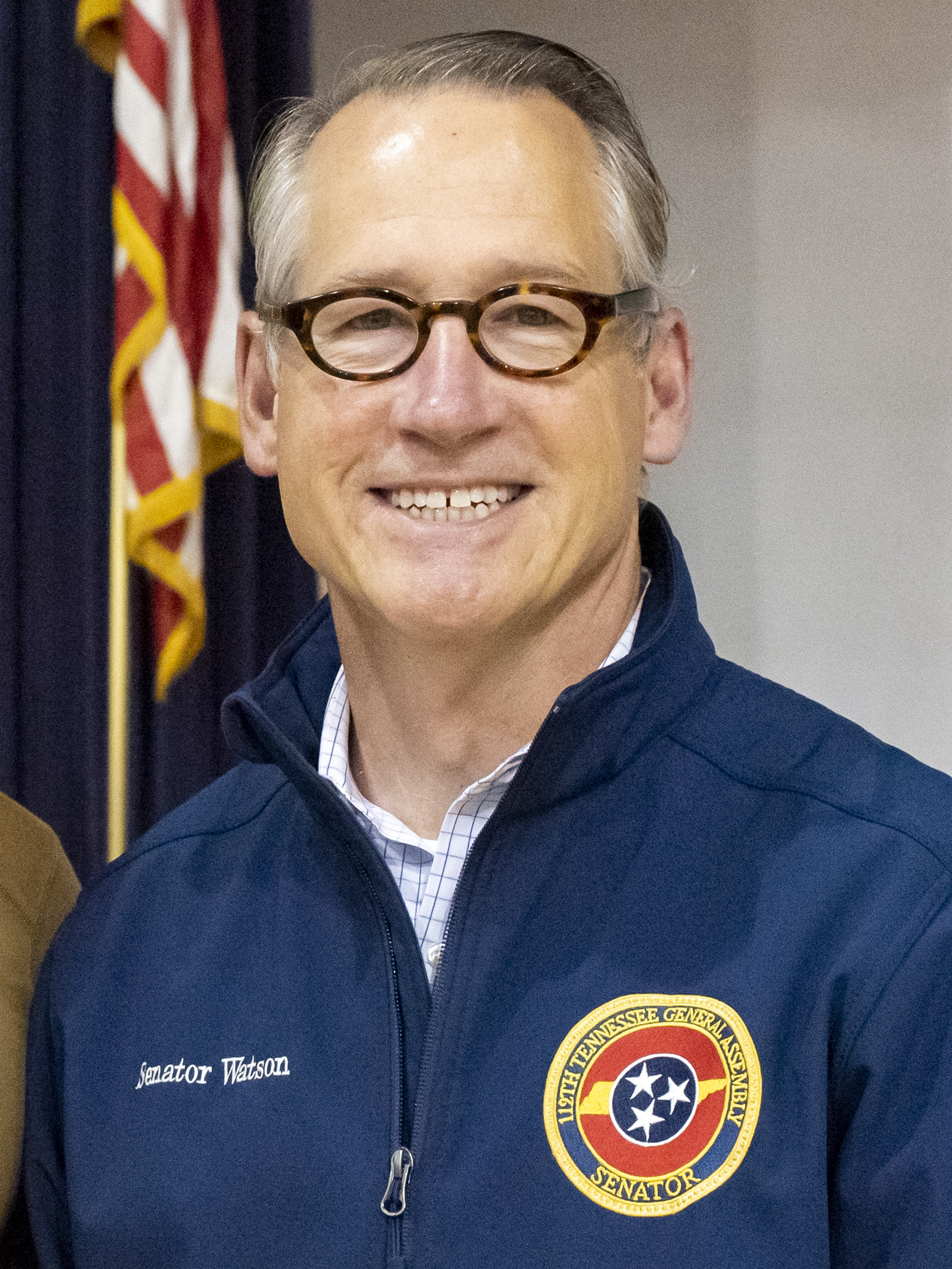
- Watson in 2022

Member of the Tennessee Senate from the 11th district
- Incumbent
- Assumed office January 9, 2007
- Preceded by: David Fowler
Committee position
Chairman of the Tennessee Senate Finance, Ways and Means Committee
Incumbent
Assumed office January 10, 2017
Preceded by	Randy McNally

Member of the Tennessee House of Representatives from the 31st district
- In office January 11, 2005 – January 9, 2007
- Preceded by: Jim Vincent
- Succeeded by: Jim Cobb

Personal details
- Born: Foy W. Watson III; October 21, 1960 (age 66) Chattanooga, Tennessee
- Party: Republican
- Spouse: Nicole Osborne
- Children: 1
- Education: University of Tennessee, Chattanooga (BA); University of Tennessee Health Science Center
- Website: Senate website Campaign website

Foy W. "Bo" Watson (born October 21, 1960) is an American politician and a Republican member of the Tennessee Senate, representing the 11th district since 2007.

== Early life and education ==
Bo Watson was born on October 21, 1960, in Chattanooga, Tennessee. He is the son of Foy W. Watson, Jr. and Doris Juanita (née Hoppe) Watson.

Watson graduated in 1979 from the Baylor School. He graduated magna cum laude from the University of Tennessee at Chattanooga in 1983 with a BA in biology and received his education and training in physical therapy at the University of Tennessee Health Science Center in Memphis, Tennessee.

== Career ==
Watson has been a practicing physical therapist for over 30 years and he is currently the Director of Sports Medicine and Therapy Services at HCA-Parkridge Medical Center in Chattanooga.

== Political positions ==
=== Transgender rights ===
In December 2024, Watson expressed support for Tennessee's law banning gender-affirming care for minors and said Tennessee would not rule out also banning it for adults in the future.

=== Immigrants' rights ===
In February 2025, Watson co-sponsored a controversial bill that would allow local education authorities to refuse to enroll or charge tuition to students illegally present in the United States or unable to prove legal residence. This bill seems to challenge the 1982 U.S. Supreme Court ruling in Plyler v. Doe, which ruled that children illegally present in the United States cannot be denied access to public education. The bill faced significant criticism from immigrant rights advocates and legal experts, who warned that it would lead to the exclusion of vulnerable children from education.

== Election ==
Watson was first elected as a TN state senator in 2006 for the 105th Tennessee General Assembly, having previously served as a state representative during the 104th General Assembly. He represents the 11th district, which encompasses part of Hamilton County. From July 2011 until January 2017, he was Speaker pro tempore in the Tennessee Senate.

In 2018, Watson ran against Randall Price in the general election for Tennessee State Senate District 11. On November 6, 2018, Watson defeated Price in the election.

2018 General Election District 11
Candidates	%	Votes
Bo Watson	65.1	51,082
Randall Price	34.9	27,332

== Committees/Community Outreach ==
In January 2017 Watson became chairman of the Senate Finance, Ways and Means Committee. He is chairman of the Senate Rules Committee, Chairman of the Joint Committee on Pensions and Insurance, member of the Senate Health and Welfare Committee, the Senate Commerce and Labor Committee and the Fiscal Review Committee.

Watson is a past board member of the Baylor School Alumni Association and is a past member on the Baylor School Board of Trustees. He has been involved in the Junior Achievement program at Orchard Knob Elementary School and Habitat for Humanity. Watson is an American Heart Association Volunteer and a past board member of the Wesley Center at UTC. He is also a past board member of the American Cancer Society Relay for Life and a past board member of the University of Tennessee National Alumni Association.

== Personal life ==
He is married to Nicole (née Osborne) Watson, an attorney. He has one son.
