= Dewayne Bunch (Tennessee politician) =

American politician (born 1959)

Member of the Tennessee Senate from the 9th district
- In office January 9, 2007 – January 11, 2011
- Preceded by: Jeff Miller
- Succeeded by: Mike Bell

Member of the Tennessee House of Representatives from the 24th district
- In office January 12, 1999 – January 9, 2007
- Preceded by: Don Byrd
- Succeeded by: Kevin Brooks

Personal details
- Born: March 15, 1959 (age 67) Athens, Tennessee, U.S.
- Party: Republican
- Spouse: Karen Bunch
- Children: 2
- Education: Tennessee Technological University (BS); East Tennessee State University; Winston College of Law (JD)
- Website: House website Senate website

Dewayne Bunch (born March 15, 1959) is a Republican politician in Tennessee who formerly served in the Tennessee General Assembly and is now a magistrate judge in the Tenth Judicial District of Tennessee.

== Education and early career ==
Dewayne Bunch was born in Athens, Tennessee. Bunch graduated with a Bachelor of Science degree from Tennessee Technological University in 1981. He obtained a master's degree from East Tennessee State University in 1984 and a J.D. from University of Tennessee College of Law at Knoxville in 1990.

Bunch served as wrestling coach for Science Hill High (Johnson City, Tennessee) and Cleveland Junior High (Cleveland, Tennessee) in the early 1980s. After entering the legal profession, he was an attorney and partner at McCoin, McCoin, Bunch and Associates.

== Political career ==
Bunch served in the Tennessee House of Representatives for eight years (1999–2006), in the 101st through 104th General Assemblies, representing the 24th district, which consisted of part of Bradley County. He was elected to the Tennessee State Senate for the 105th General Assembly and served one four-year term as a state senator, representing the 9th senatorial district in the 105th and 106th General Assemblies (2007–2011).

As a member of the state legislature, Bunch was once recognized as the Tennessee School Board Legislator of the Year, was a two-time recipient of a “Friend of the Family” award, and received an "Equal Access to Justice" award from the Tennessee Alliance of Legal Services and Legal Aid of Tennessee. He was also critical of Tennessee laws that allow for appointment of judges.

In December 2010, Tennessee Secretary of State Tre Hargett appointed Bunch to a position as a state administrative law judge. Unlike the state's other administrative law judges, who are based in Nashville, it was announced that Bunch would live and work in East Tennessee.

=== Mistaken identity ===
In April 2011, several news outlets erroneously reported Tennessee State Senator Bunch the victim of a violent encounter when Kentucky State Representative Dewayne Bunch sustained a critical head injury while intervening to break up a fight between two students in the cafeteria at Whitley County High School in Kentucky. The later Dewayne Bunch succumbed to his injuries.

== Personal life ==
Bunch resides in Cleveland, Tennessee, and is married to Karen Bunch. He has two sons, Clay and Pierson.
