= Katrina Robinson =

American politician (born 1981)

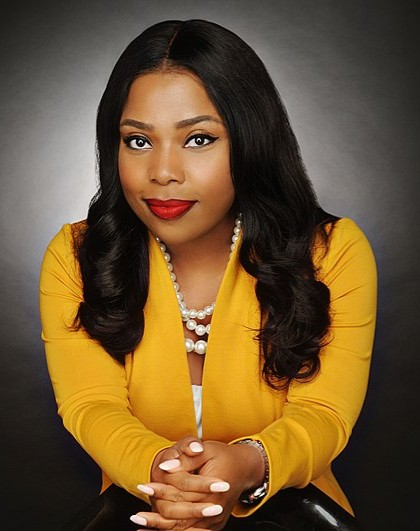

Member of the Tennessee Senate from the 33rd district
- In office January 8, 2019 – February 2, 2022
- Preceded by: Reginald Tate
- Succeeded by: London Lamar

Personal details
- Born: January 13, 1981 (age 45) Memphis, Tennessee, U.S.
- Party: Democratic
- Children: 2
- Relatives: Lorenzen Wright (brother-in-law)
- Education: University of Memphis (BBA); Union University (BSN)

Katrina Robinson (born January 13, 1981) is an American former politician who served in the Tennessee Senate from the 33rd district from 2019 to 2022 as a member of the Democratic Party. She was the first sitting member of the state senate to be indicted since Operation Tennessee Waltz and later became the first person to ever be expelled from the state senate.

Robinson was born in Memphis, Tennessee, educated at the University of Memphis and Union University, and founded a nursing college in 2015. She was elected to the state senate in the 2018 election after defeating incumbent Senator Reginald Tate in the Democratic primary.

Robinson was indicted on forty-eight charges relating to the embezzlement of $600,000 from federal grants to her nursing school in 2020. The charges against her were reduced to twenty before Judge Sheryl H. Lipman acquitted her on fifteen charges. She was found guilty on four counts of wire fraud in 2021.

== Early life and education ==
Katrina Robinson was born on January 13, 1981, in Memphis, Tennessee. Her sister, Sherra Wright-Robinson, was the wife of professional basketball player Lorenzen Wright and was convicted for his murder.

From 1998 to 2008, she attended the University of Memphis and graduated with a Bachelor of Business Administration in marketing management. In 2010, she graduated from Union University with a Bachelor of Science in Nursing.

== Career ==
=== Nursing college ===
In 2015, Robinson founded The Healthcare Institute, a nursing college, and received $1.6 million in grants from the United States Department of Health and Human Services. She received a total of $2.2 million in federal grants from 2015 to 2019. The Healthcare Institute started with two students and later expanded to over six hundred students.

=== Tennessee Senate ===
In 2018, Robinson was elected to the Tennessee Senate from the 33rd district as a member of the Democratic Party. On January 29, 2018, Robinson announced that she would run in the Democratic primary. She defeated incumbent Senator Reginald Tate in the Democratic primary and faced no opposition in the general election. Tate had been censured by the Shelby County Democratic Party and Robinson was endorsed by United States Representative Steve Cohen and Senate Minority Leader Sara Kyle.

=== Criminal conviction ===
In 2016, an investigation into Robinson was started after an anonymous complaint to the United States Department of Health and Human Services reported that she had used $550 of federal grant money to purchase a Louis Vuitton handbag. On February 21 and July 28, 2020, the Federal Bureau of Investigation executed search warrants at Robinson's house and nursing school. On July 30, Robinson was indicted on 48 charges, 24 charges of theft and embezzlement from government programs, and 24 charges of wire fraud, in the United States District Court for the Western District of Tennessee. The Federal Bureau of Investigation reported that her expenses included a trip to Montego Bay, Jamaica which lasted six days, $2,929.26 spent at Wayfair, $856 spent on a Carnival Cruise Line, and $54,000 for a retirement fund.

Robinson was accused of stealing $600,000 from $2.2 million in federal grants given to her nursing school from 2015 to 2019. She was the first sitting member of the Tennessee Senate to be indicted since Operation Tennessee Waltz in 2005.

On August 12, 2020, she pleaded not guilty, but was found guilty on four of the five charges of wire fraud on September 30, 2021. The forty-eight charges were reduced to twenty charges and Judge Sheryl H. Lipman acquitted her of fifteen of the counts stating that the evidence matched to different theories which could cause a mistrial if theories were switched during the trial. She was sentenced on March 18, 2022 to one year supervised release. A federal case against her, Katie Ayers, and Brooke Boudreaux was dismissed by Lipman after Robinson agreed to complete at twelve month diversion period.

Lieutenant Governor Randy McNally called for Robinson to resign following her conviction. Robinson claims that she was "targeted for prosecution" and Representative Torrey Harris opposes forcing her out of the legislature and claimed that "there was no evidence presented that she misappropriated less than $3,500 from her own business". Robinson became the first member of the state senate to be expelled when the state senate voted twenty-seven to five, with all Republicans voting in favor and all Democrats voting against, on February 2, 2022, to remove her.

=== Campaign funding disclosure lawsuit ===
In February 2023, Robinson was sued by the Tennessee Registry of Election Finance to collect financial penalties resulting from her failure to file 2020 and 2021 financial disclosures documents. Robinson was initially assessed a $7,500 fine in August, 2021 for not filing required campaign disclosure documents for 2020. The registry then added a $10,000 fine after Robinson again failed to submit the documents in 2021. Tennessee Attorney General Jonathan Skrmetti's office is prosecuting the case.

== Electoral history ==
2018 Tennessee Senate 33rd district election
Primary election
Party	Candidate	Votes	%
Democratic	Katrina Robinson	14,164	68.66%
Democratic	Reginald Tate (incumbent)	6,464	31.34%
Total votes		20,628	100.00%
General election
Democratic	Katrina Robinson	42,992	100.00%
Total votes		42,992	100.00%
