= Jeff Miller (Tennessee politician) =

American politician (born 1962)

Member of the Tennessee Senate from the 9th district
- In office January 10, 1995 – January 9, 2007
- Preceded by: Charles Patten
- Succeeded by: Dewayne Bunch

Personal details
- Born: November 9, 1962 (age 64)
- Party: Republican
- Spouse: Bridget Miller (div. 2006)
- Children: 3
- Education: University of Tennessee (BA); Winston College of Law (JD)

Jeffrey Andrew Miller (born November 9, 1962) is an attorney and politician from Cleveland, Tennessee. From 1994 until 2006, Miller was a Republican member of the Tennessee Senate.

== Biography ==
Miller received a Bachelor of Arts degree from the University of Tennessee in 1985, and in 1987 graduated from the University of Tennessee College of Law. He received his law license in 1988.

As a State Senator, Miller was a strong opponent of a state income tax. He also led efforts to put a constitutional amendment on the ballot to ban same-sex marriage. This took place around the same time Miller failed to uphold the sanctity of his own marriage, carrying on extra-marital affairs with his then-legislative research assistant, Jessa Fahey. He was instrumental in the imposition of the state lottery, ensuring that all money collected was directed to education, and passed the "sales tax holiday", providing Tennesseans with a weekend during which they can buy clothing, school supplies, and qualifying computers without paying sales tax.

Miller has served a total of three terms in the state senate; he previously announced his intention to retire after the end of his second term in 2002 but subsequently reconsidered and was again re-elected. In February 2006 Miller announced that he would not seek a fourth term.

In January 2009, the Tennessee Bureau of Investigation raided his Cleveland law office, alleging Miller may have over-billed the Bradley County while he served as the delinquent tax attorney. Miller was arraigned in May 2009 on misconduct and conspiracy charges. At trial, the judge dismissed two of the three charges before the defense put on any proof. When the state rested, the defense opted not to move forward and the jury found Miller not guilty of the last charge.

Miller now practices law full-time in Cleveland, Tennessee.

=== 2024 candidacy for district attorney ===
In 2023, Miller announced his candidacy for district attorney, for Tennessee's 10th Judicial District, which encompasses Bradley, Polk, Monroe, and McMinn counties. This after the incumbent, Steve Crump, resigned to become the executive director of the Tennessee State District Attorney's Conference.
