= Lowe Finney =

American politician (born 1975)

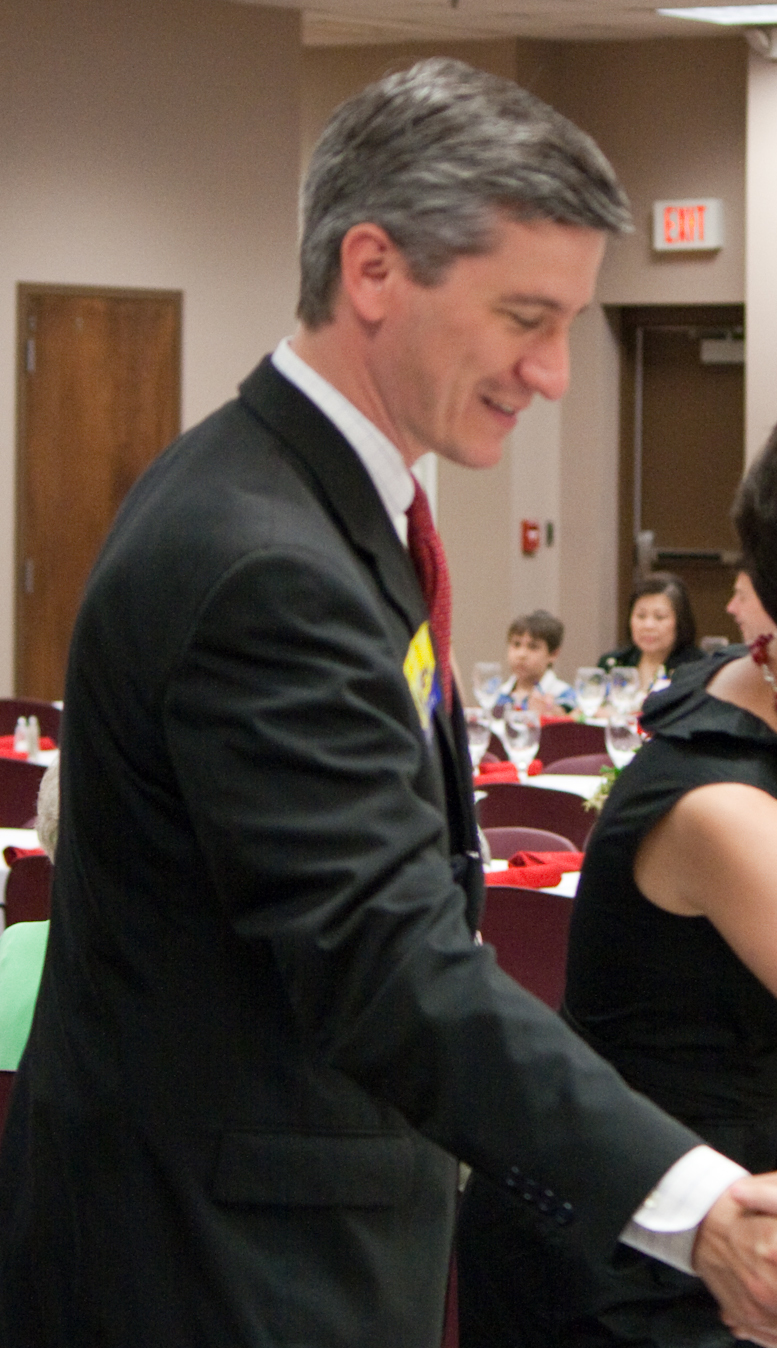

Member of the Tennessee Senate from the 25th district
- In office 2006–2014
- Preceded by: Don McLeary
- Succeeded by: Ed Jackson

Personal details
- Born: November 1, 1975 (age 51)
- Party: Democratic
- Spouse: Tiffany
- Education: University of Tennessee, Martin, St. Louis University School of Law
- Profession: Attorney

Lowe Finney (born November 1, 1975 in Dresden, Weakley County, Tennessee) is an American politician and a Democratic former member of the Tennessee Senate for the 25th district, which is composed of Madison, Gibson, and Carroll counties.

== Education and career ==
Lowe Finney graduated from the University of Tennessee at Martin, where he was a member of Sigma Phi Epsilon, with a Bachelor of Science in Business Administration; he obtained a JD at Saint Louis University School of Law. He taught as an instructor at Lane College in Jackson, Tennessee and as an instructor at Lambuth University in Jackson. He taught Civil Rights and Business Law and Ethics.

=== Tennessee Senate ===
Lowe Finney was first elected to the state senate in 2006, having won against Republican incumbent Don McLeary by 456 votes. He served as the Secretary and Treasurer of the Senate Democratic Caucus and the Vice-Chair of the Senate State and Local Government Committee. Senator Finney was also a member of the Environment, Conservation, and Tourism; Government Operations; and Joint Lottery Oversight Committees.

In 2010, Finney ran for re-election and, again, defeated McLeary in a close race. Of the just over 50,000 ballots cast, Finney won by only 1,211 votes.

On July 31, 2013, Finney announced in an email to supporters that he would not seek a third term in the State Senate.

=== Mayor of Jackson campaign ===
On August 6, 2014, Finney told The Jackson Sun that he would be running in the May 2015 Jackson, Tennessee mayoral election against incumbent Jerry Gist. Finney finished second in the balloting with 4,757 votes (40.92 percent of 11,733 votes cast).

== Political views ==
Lowe Finney has suggested that Tennessee have a State Department of Aging with a Cabinet-level administrator to run it, in order to deal with the growing senior population that is expected to double within the next 15 years.
