= Jimmy Eldridge =

American politician (born 1948)

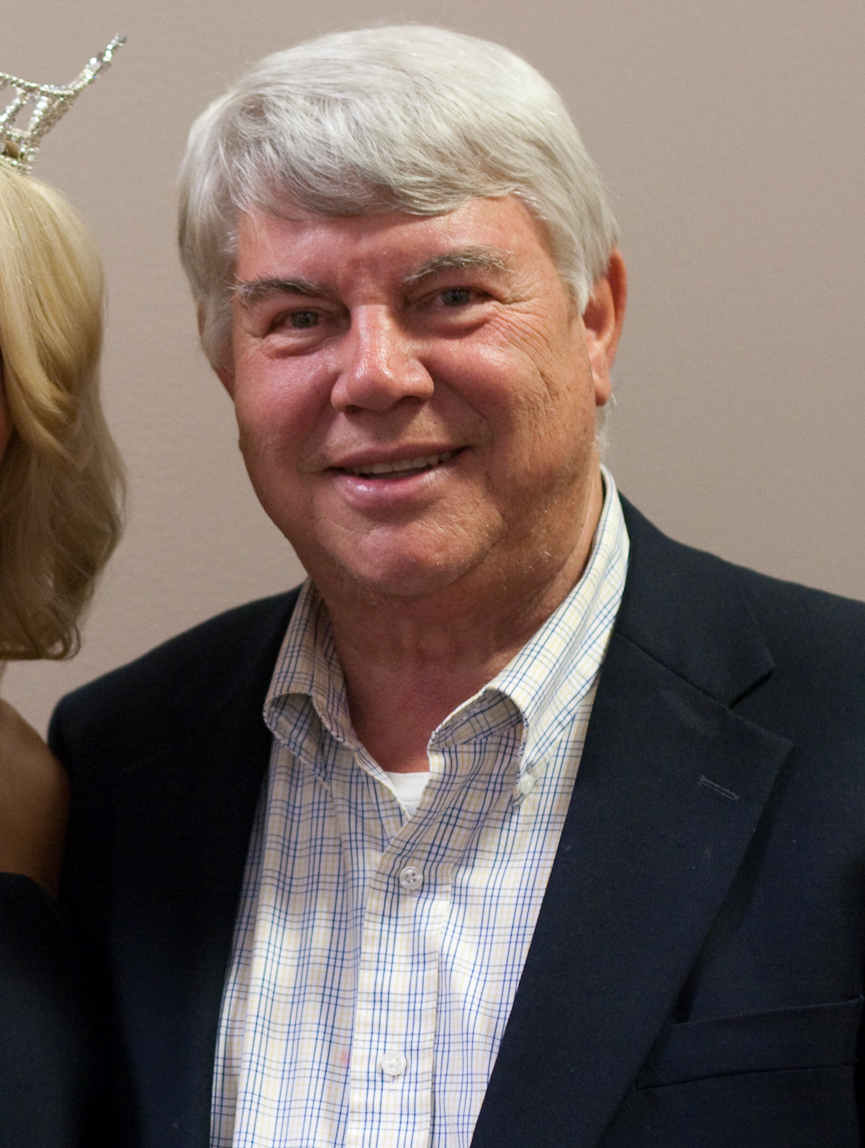

Member of the Tennessee House of Representatives from the 73rd district
- In office January 2003 – January 2019
- Preceded by: Matt Kisber
- Succeeded by: Chris Todd

Personal details
- Born: April 1, 1948 (age 78) Jackson, Tennessee, U.S.
- Party: Republican
- Education: Lambuth University (BS)
- Occupation: Politician

Jimmy A. Eldridge (born April 1, 1948 in Jackson, Tennessee) is an American politician and a former Republican member of the Tennessee House of Representatives who represented District 73 from 2003 until 2019.

== Education ==
Eldridge earned his BS in biology and chemistry from Lambuth University.

== Elections ==
- 2012 Eldridge was unopposed for both the August 2, 2012 Republican Primary, winning with 5,559 votes, and the November 6, 2012 General election, winning with 19,048 votes (70.6%) against Democratic nominee Corey Currie.
- 2000 To challenge District 73 incumbent Democratic Representative Matt Kisber, Eldridge was unopposed for the August 3, 2000 Republican Primary, winning with 2,341 votes, but lost the November 7, 2000 General election to Representative Kisber.
- 2002 When Representative Kisber left the Legislature and left the seat open, Eldridge ran in the three-way August 1, 2002 Republican Primary, winning with 4,824 votes (58.3%) and won the November 5, 2002 General election with 10,062 votes (53.6%) against Democratic nominee Danny Waynick.
- 2004 Eldridge was unopposed for the August 5, 2004 Republican Primary, winning with 3,424 votes, and won the November 2, 2004 General election with 17,089 votes (72.0%) against Democratic nominee Charlie Caldwell.
- 2006 Eldridge was unopposed for both the August 3, 2006 Republican Primary, winning with 6,363 votes, and the November 7, 2006 General election, winning with 15,977 votes.
- 2008 Eldridge was unopposed for both the August 7, 2008 Republican Primary, winning with 2,375 votes, and the November 4, 2008 General election, winning with 20,573 votes.
- 2010 Eldridge was unopposed for the August 5, 2010 Republican Primary, winning with 8,038 votes, and won the November 2, 2010 General election with 14,065 votes (nearly 100%) against a write-in candidate.
