= Brenda Gilmore =

American politician (born 1952)

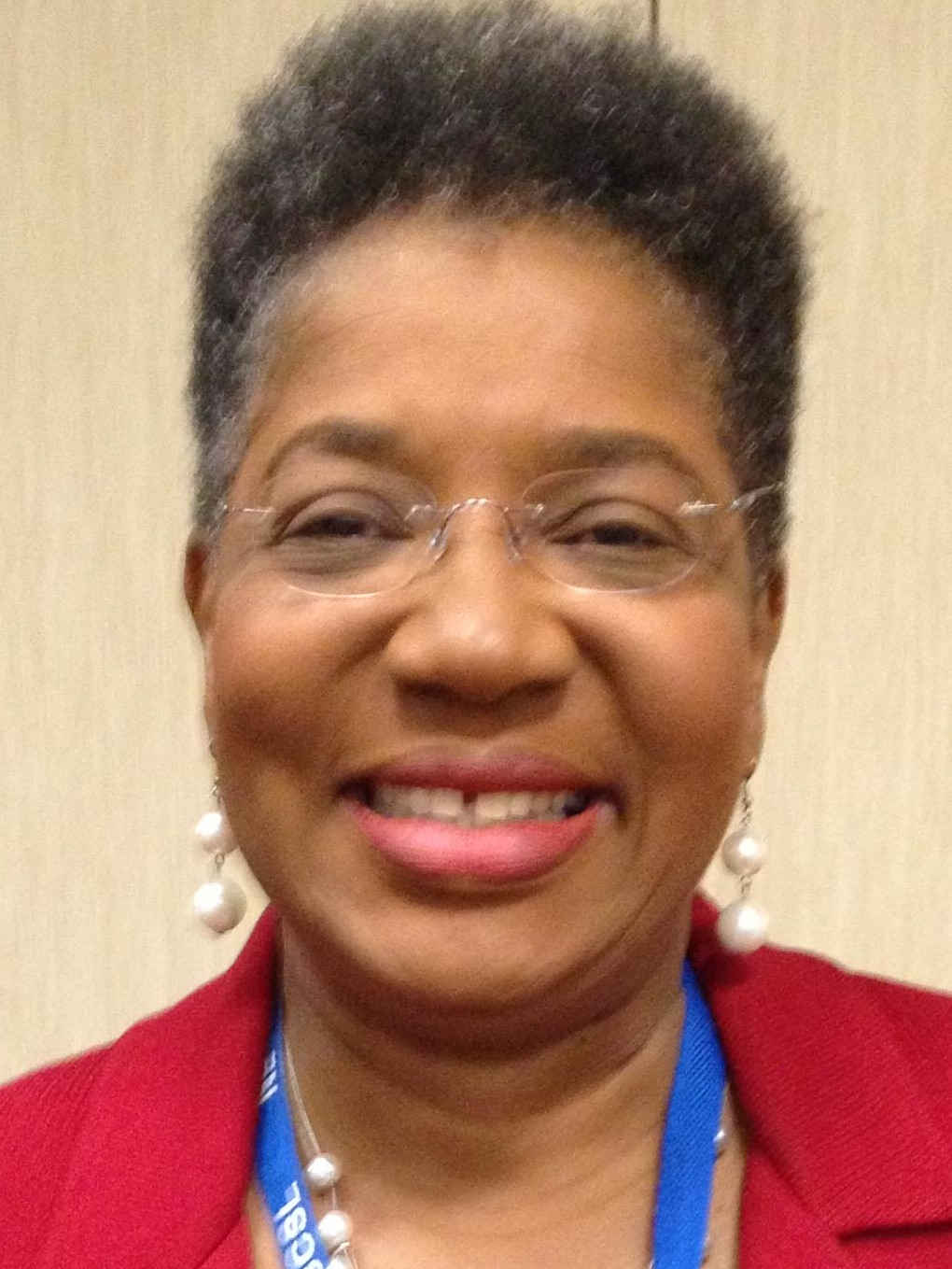

Member of the Tennessee Senate from the 19th district
- In office January 8, 2019 – January 10, 2023
- Preceded by: Thelma Harper
- Succeeded by: Charlane Oliver

Member of the Tennessee House of Representatives from the 54th district
- In office January 9, 2007 – January 8, 2019
- Preceded by: Edith Taylor Langster
- Succeeded by: Vincent Dixie

Member of the Nashville Metro Council from the 1st district
- In office 1993–2003

Personal details
- Born: December 9, 1952 (age 73) Sumner County, Tennessee, U.S.
- Party: Democratic
- Spouse: Married
- Education: Tennessee State University; Bachelor of Science (BS) Vanderbilt University

Brenda Gilmore (born December 9, 1952) is a former Democratic member of the Tennessee Senate, representing the 19th district from 2019 to 2023.

== Education and non-political career ==
Brenda Gilmore graduated with a Bachelor of Science in Business degree from Tennessee State University in 1984, and with a Master of Human Resource Development degree from Vanderbilt University in 1988. She is also a graduate of the Tennessee Government Executive Institute, the Vanderbilt Leadership Development Forum, and Leadership Nashville. From 1979 to 1987, she worked at the Tennessee Department of General Services. She is the Director of Mail Service at Vanderbilt University and has been director of State Postal Services. She has been a clerk and secretary of Fairfield Baptist Church and a Sunday School teacher.

She served on the Nashville Metro Council from the 1st District from 1993 to 2003. She was then elected to the Tennessee House. During the 2003-2007 session, she was the chairwoman of the Budget and Finance Committee.

== Personal life ==
Her daughter, Erica Gilmore, is a member of the Nashville Metro Council from the 19th district.
