= Operation Tennessee Waltz =

FBI and TBI sting operation

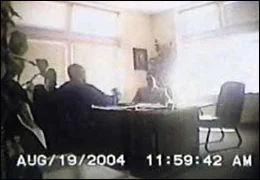
An unnamed subject (right) making a deal with an FBI undercover agent during Operation Tennessee Waltz

Operation Tennessee Waltz was a sting operation set up by federal and state law enforcement agents, including the Federal Bureau of Investigation (FBI) and Tennessee Bureau of Investigation (TBI). The operation led to the arrest of seven Tennessee state lawmakers and two men identified as "bagmen" in the indictment on the morning of May 26, 2005, on bribery charges. The FBI and TBI followed these arrests with an additional arrest of two county commissioners, one from Hamilton County, and the other a member of the prominent Hooks family of Memphis. Investigators also arrested a former county administrator.

== Execution ==
The FBI set up E-Cycle, a bogus company based in Atlanta and claiming to recycle electronics by sending the electronics to third world countries.

The FBI sting operation ran from 2003 to 2007 in which eleven state and local officials were arrested for in relation to an FBI sting operation, using a fake company claiming to recycle electronics called E-Cycle Management. The company was used to offer bribes for favorable legislation.

1. John Ford (D) State Senator from Memphis in the 29th District, took an $800,000 bribe, and was sentenced to 66 months in prison.
2. Roscoe Dixon (D) State Senator from Memphis in the 33rd District, was found guilty of taking a $9,500 bribe, and was sentenced to 63 months in jail.
3. J. Chris Newton (R) State Representative from Bradley County which is in the 22nd District, was found guilty of taking a $1,500 bribe and conspiracy. He was sentenced to one year and one day in jail, two years probation and community service.
4. Kathryn I. Bowers (D) State Senator, replaced Roscoe Dixon in the 33rd District when he left office on charges of bribery. Bowers was also found guilty of taking a $5,750 bribe, and was sentenced to 16 months in jail.
5. Ward Crutchfield (D) State Senator from District 10, pled guilty to bribery, and was sentenced to six months of home confinement, two years probation, and fined.

Local politicians who were arrested include:

1. William Cotton, Hamilton County Commissioner, extortion, sentenced to 3 years.
2. Charles Love, Hamilton County School Board member, the bagman, extortion, 12 months.
3. Michael Hooks, Sr., Shelby County Commissioner, pled guilty to taking $24K in bribes and was sentenced to 26 months in prison.
4. Michael Hooks, Jr., Memphis School Board member, conspired to take $3K for bogus consulting work. He resigned and was sentenced to 30 days in prison.
5. Calvin Williams (R), Shelby County Administrator, convicted of extortion and bribery, sentenced to 33 months.

== See also ==
- Operation Rocky Top
