= Reginald Tate (politician) =

American politician (1954–2019)

Member of the Tennessee Senate from the 33rd district
- In office 2006–2019
- Preceded by: Kathryn Bowers
- Succeeded by: Katrina Robinson

Personal details
- Born: September 14, 1954 Memphis, Tennessee, U.S.
- Died: October 21, 2019 (aged 65) Memphis, Tennessee, U.S.
- Party: Democratic
- Education: University of Memphis
- Profession: Architect

Reginald Tate (September 14, 1954 – October 21, 2019) was an American politician and a Democratic member of the Tennessee Senate for the 33rd district, which encompasses part of Shelby County.

== Education and career ==
Reginald Tate graduated with a Bachelor of Arts degree in architectural engineering from the University Of Memphis. He worked as an architect and was the president and CEO of Accent by Design. He served as the vice chairman of the Cocaine, Alcohol Awareness Program.

=== Public office ===
Reginald Tate was first elected to the state senate in 2006. He was the Vice Chair of the Senate Education Committee and Health Disparity Committee, and the Treasurer of both the Tennessee Legislative Black Caucus and the Shelby County Delegation. He was a member of the Senate Commerce, Labor and Agriculture Committee; the Joint Fiscal Review Committee; the Joint Fiscal Review Contract Services Subcommittee; Joint Business Tax Committee; the Joint Lottery Oversight Committee; the Cover TN Advisory Committee; the Special Joint Committee to Study Professional Boxing, Mixed Martial Arts, Wrestling, and Sparring; and the Special Joint Committee to Study Small Business Retention and Development. He also serves on the Shelby County Democratic Party Executive Committee.

In July 2018, Tate, who regularly voted with Republicans, was censured by the Shelby County Democratic Party for making derogatory comments about Democrats and for identifying himself as a Republican.

Tate ran for re-election in 2018 as State Senator but lost renomination in the Democratic primary to Katrina Robinson, who was endorsed by Minority Leader Lee Harris.

Preceded by Shea Flinn	Tennessee State Senator, 33rd District; 2006–2018	Succeeded by Katrina Robinson
