= David Fowler (politician) =

American politician (born 1958)

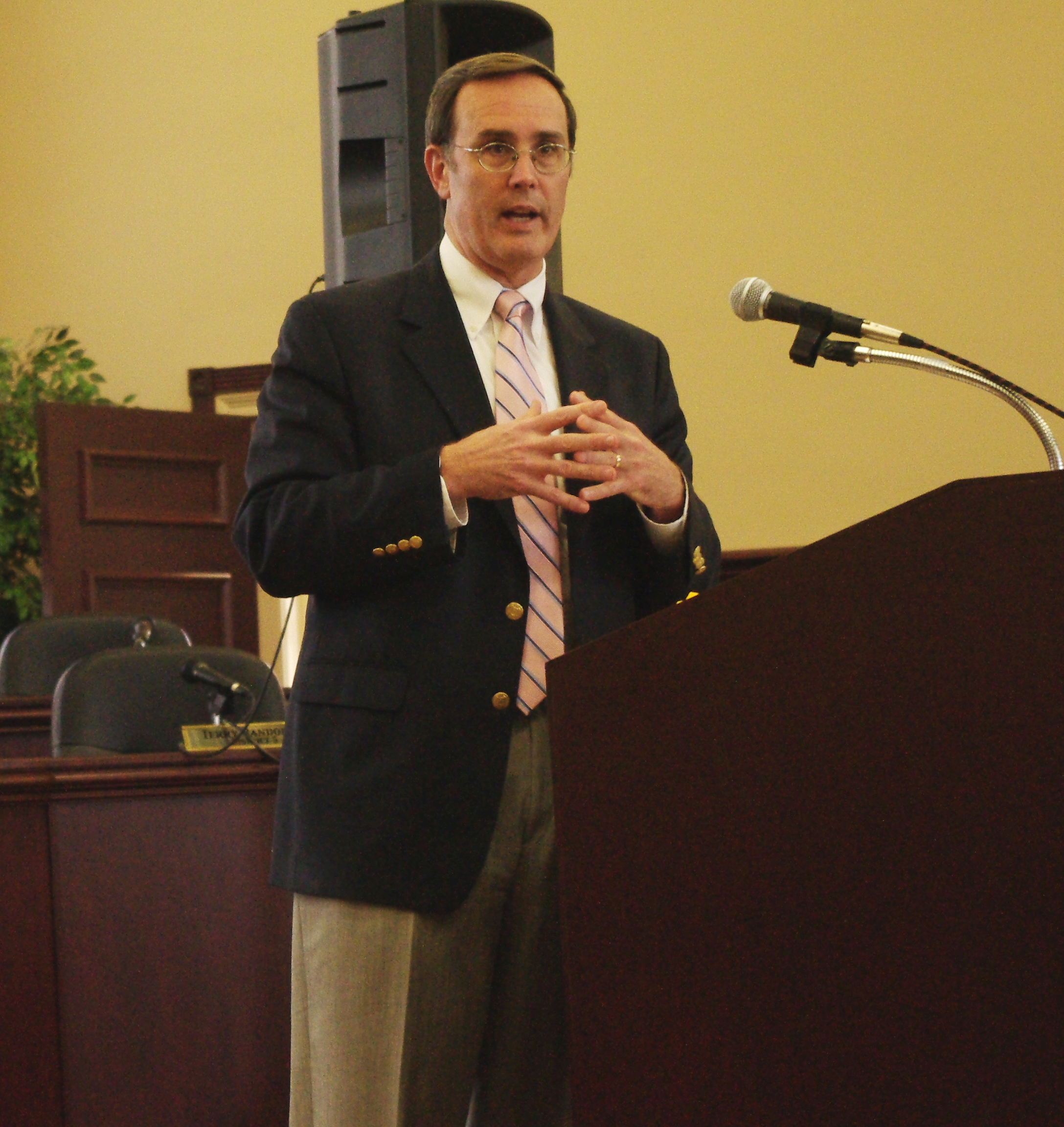
- Fowler speaking at a Putnam County Right to Life meeting in Cookeville in January 2012
- Born: June 30, 1958 (age 68); Fort Oglethorpe, Georgia, U.S.
- Education: University of Tennessee at Chattanooga
- Occupation: Politician
- Political party: Republican
- Children: 1

David Fowler (born 1958) is an American politician and a former member of the Tennessee Senate for the 11th district, which comprises part of Hamilton County.

== Early life ==
David Fowler was born on June 30, 1958, in Fort Oglethorpe, Georgia. He grew up in Chattanooga, Tennessee. He graduated from the University of Tennessee at Chattanooga with a B.S. in 1980, and with a J.D. from University of Cincinnati College of Law in 1983.

== Career ==
Fowler practiced law in Cincinnati, Ohio, and Chattanooga, Tennessee. taught Law and Government at Bryan College for four years.

Fowler was a Republican member of the Tennessee State Senate from the 99th Tennessee General Assembly until the 104th, representing Signal Mountain, Tennessee.

Fowler is the president of the Family Action Council of Tennessee (FACT), an organization associated with the Focus on the Family. Upon retiring as state senator in 2006, he donated US$20,000 to FACT. A decade later, in 2016, Fowler staged a rally outside the Tennessee State Capitol in favor of an anti-transgender bathroom bill.

== Personal life ==
Fowler is married, and he has a child. He lives in Nashville, Tennessee.

== Controversy ==
In 2018 bill banning 'child brides' is scuttled in Tennessee House after Fowler objects.
