= Mike Bell (politician) =

American politician (born 1963)

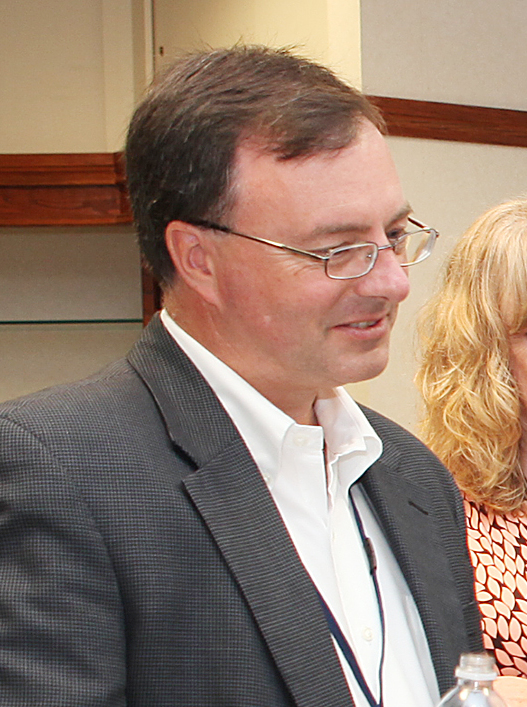
- Bell in 2010

Member of the Tennessee Senate from the 9th district
- In office January 11, 2011 – August 31, 2022
- Preceded by: Dewayne Bunch
- Succeeded by: David Crews

Member of the Tennessee House of Representatives from the 23rd district
- In office January 9, 2007 – January 11, 2011
- Preceded by: Bob McKee
- Succeeded by: John Forgety

Personal details
- Born: March 16, 1963 (age 63) Cleveland, Tennessee, U.S.
- Party: Republican
- Children: 5
- Education: Cleveland State Community College
- Website: House website Senate website

Mike Bell (born March 16, 1963) is a former Republican member of the Tennessee Senate representing the 9th district, encompassing Riceville, Bradley County, McMinn County, Meigs County, and Polk County. Prior to that, he was a member of the Tennessee House of Representatives.

== Background and education ==
Mike Bell was born on March 16, 1963, in Cleveland, Tennessee. He graduated from Bradley Central High School, and later from Cleveland State Community College to further his education. He married Lisa Brumley Bell on June 8, 1985, and together they have five children. Mike bell is also Christian, as well as a small business owner and farmer. He was sworn in as state senator on January 11, 2011, after being sworn in he stated "Taking the oath of office is an incredibly humbling experience," "The people of the ninth district have entrusted me with a very important job, and I will work every day to earn the trust of all the people that I represent." This would be his first time as state senator however, he had previous experience in the House Of Representatives serving two terms.

== Voting history and Committees ==
Bell served in the Tennessee Senate from 2011 until 2022. During his tenure, he voted on more than 100 bills, including the following:

HB1264 - Voted yes, Bill to enact a concealed Handgun carry permit.

HB0632 - Voted yes, Bill to enact an award for teachers of five additional professional development points, if they went above their set goal for the year.

HB0164 - Voted nay, Bill to enact a law that prohibits any person from supporting or holding a cell phone while operating a vehicle.

Mike bell is also part of many different committees. He is a chair for the Senate Judiciary Committee, a member of the Senate Education Committee, a member of the Senate Government Operations Committee, a member of the Judiciary and Government Subcommittee of Joint Government Operations Committee, and a member of the Joint Government Operations Commerce, Labor, Transportation and Agriculture Subcommittee.

Political offices
Preceded by Lou Patten	Tennessee Senator, 9th district 2010 – 2023	Succeeded by Steve Southerland
