= Bobby Carter =

American politician (1939–2015)

Member of the Tennessee Senate from the 27th district
- In office 1995–2002
- Preceded by: Joe McKnight
- Succeeded by: Don McLeary

Personal details
- Born: October 7, 1939 Scott County, Virginia
- Died: January 5, 2015 (aged 75)
- Party: Republican
- Education: University of Tennessee-Knoxville

Robert E. Carter (October 7, 1939 – January 5, 2015) was an American politician and schoolteacher from Tennessee.

== Biography ==
Carter was born in Scott County, Virginia to Robert and Estelle Carter. He attended Virginia High School in Bristol, Virginia and earned a BS and MS in education from the University of Tennessee, where he also played for the school's basketball team. After serving as an assistant coach for the 1961–1962 season, Carter left Tennessee. He then taught and coached at Beaver High School in Pennsylvania, Humboldt High School in Humboldt, Tennessee and Union University. Later, he worked for Coca-Cola in Jackson. Carter became a board member of three national organizations with branches in Jackson, the Boys and Girls Club, Salvation Army and West Tennessee United Way, as well as many other local groups. He helped found the West Tennessee Healthcare Foundation. A Republican, Carter defeated Joe McKnight in the 1994 election. Carter served on three committees throughout his time in office: Commerce, Labor and Agriculture, Education and Government Operations. He lost the 2002 election, and was succeeded by Don McLeary.

Carter was diagnosed with multiple sclerosis in the 1980s. He died on January 5, 2015.
