= Thelma Harper (politician) =

American politician (1940–2021)

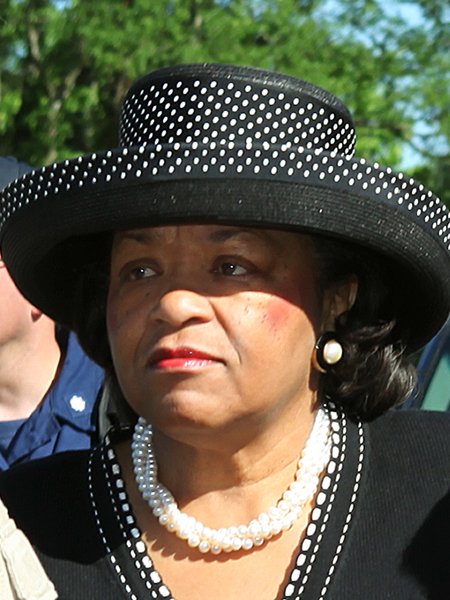

Member of the Tennessee Senate from the 19th district
- In office January 10, 1989 – January 8, 2019
- Succeeded by: Brenda Gilmore

Personal details
- Born: Thelma Marie Claybrooks; December 2, 1940 Brentwood, Tennessee, U.S.
- Died: April 22, 2021 (aged 80) Nashville, Tennessee, U.S.
- Party: Democratic
- Education: Tennessee State University (BS)

Thelma M. Harper (December 2, 1940 – April 22, 2021) was an American politician and the first African-American woman state senator in Tennessee and the longest-serving female state senator in Tennessee history. She was also the first African-American woman to serve as the chair of the Senate Government Operations Committee; she held that position during the 102nd, 103rd, 104th, and 105th General Assemblies, and she also served as vice chair of the Senate State and Local Government Committee during the 97th and 101st General Assemblies and the first senator to serve as chair of the Tennessee Black Caucus.

Harper, was a Democratic member of the Tennessee Senate for the 19th district, which is composed of a large portion of Davidson County including the urban core of Nashville.

She began her public service in 1980, when she was elected as executive committeewoman for the 2nd district. She was next elected to the city council in 1983, where she served for 8 years. She simultaneously served as the 2nd District councilwoman and as state senator of the 19th District to complete her term in the city council.

She had a Bachelor of Science degree in business administration/accounting from Tennessee State University.

== Political timeline ==
Harper served as a state senator for 30 years. Harper began her extraordinary public service career when she was selected to serve as grand jury foreman for Davidson County's 5th Circuit Court and subsequently sought election to the Metropolitan Nashville/Davidson County Council to represent the 2nd District. For eight years Harper served as a member of the Nashville/Davidson County Metropolitan Council. Senator Harper's eight-year tenure on the Metropolitan Council saw her lead the successful fight to close the Bordeaux Landfill via a number of protests and blockades of dump trucks, during which she was arrested along with her fellow community activists. Before the facility was closed she sponsored legislation that enacted to set fair and equitable standards relative to landfill locations. Virtuous Women Book: Voices of Wisdom

She was a delegate to the Democratic National Convention in 1980, 1984, 1988, 1992, 2000, 2004, 2008, and 2012. In 2000 she was one of the convention speakers on day 4 of the convention, speaking to "The Al Gore I Know".

== Key political legislation ==
Harper provided a strong, unwavering voice for women, our most vulnerable children, and the elderly. She passed legislation on a range of causes, including the establishment of a fee waiver to provide students from low-income homes with school supplies and lunches; mandatory insurance coverage of breast reconstruction symmetry for breast cancer survivors; increased legal protections to stop financial exploitation of the elderly by their caretakers; and the safe haven law to save abandoned babies.

She sponsored the legislation that renamed a portion of U.S. Highway 41 in honor of civil rights legend Rosa Parks. Harper played an integral role in the economic development of the 19th Senate District, helping win passage of numerous amendments to state budgets to benefit the citizens of her district through job training programs, workforce development efforts, and capital projects like the Nashville Music City Center, where she worked to amend Tennessee's usury law to allow Nashville to sell the bonds to build the facility.

The 19th district includes Downtown Nashville; Harper worked closely with five sitting Nashville mayors and four governors. She was instrumental in some of Nashville’s historical moments, like the development of the Music City Center, the Downtown Nashville Library and the facilitation to bringing the NFL Titans Football team to Nashville. She was also instrumental in getting funds for Tennessee State University, Meharry Medical College, and many non-profit organizations throughout the years.

In 2004, when asked by The Tennessean whether the Tennessee state constitution should be changed to say the right to an abortion is not guaranteed, she replied that the issue should not be written into the state constitution. In 1996, Harper was one of only two state senators that did not vote in support of a bill to ban gay marriage in Tennessee, instead choosing to abstain. Harper proposed legislation that would rename U.S. Highway 41 as Rosa Parks Boulevard, which was later successfully passed in both the House and the Senate.

== Committees ==
Throughout her career she served in numerous committees. She was the first African-American woman to serve as the chair of the Senate Government Operations Committee; she held that position during the 102nd, 103rd, 104th, and 105th General Assemblies, and she also served as vice chair of the Senate State and Local Government Committee during the 97th and 101st General Assemblies and the first senator to serve as chair of the Tennessee Black Caucus.

Preceded by n/a	Tennessee State Senator, 19th District; 1989–2019	Succeeded by Brenda Gilmore
