= Rusty Crowe =

American politician (born 1947)

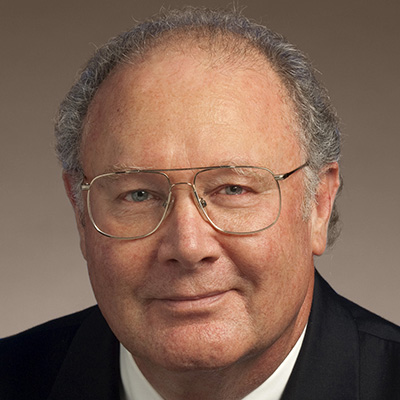

Member of the Tennessee Senate from the 3rd district
- Incumbent
- Assumed office January 1991
- Preceded by: Don Arnold

Personal details
- Born: April 2, 1947 (age 79) Johnson City, Tennessee, U.S.
- Party: Democratic (Before 1996); Republican (1996–present)
- Spouse: Sarah
- Children: 2
- Education: East Tennessee State University (BS); Atlanta Law School (JD)

Military service
- Allegiance: United States
- Branch/service: United States Army
- Years of service: 1967–1971

Dewey "Rusty" Crowe (born April 2, 1947), is an American politician in the state of Tennessee. He is member of the Tennessee Senate representing the 3rd district, which encompasses Washington County, Unicoi County and Carter County.

Crowe also serves as vice president of Shared Health Services in Johnson City, Tennessee and he is also President of Product Specialty Corporation of Franklin, Tennessee. Crowe was previously employed by East Tennessee State University from 1980 to 2003, last working with ETSU as an assistant dean in the continuing studies department.

In February 2020, Crowe announced that he was running for Tennessee's 1st congressional district in the 2020 election. Crowe placed 3rd in the contest with approximately 16% of the vote.

== Early career ==
Born in Johnson City, Tennessee, Crowe obtained a Bachelor of Science in Criminal Justice from East Tennessee State University and a Juris Doctor from Atlanta Law School. From 1967 to 1971, he served in the U.S. Army Security Agency intercepting Morse Code from the enemy in Southeast Asia. According to Project Vote Smart, he supports the displaying of the Ten Commandments in public schools, the use of the death penalty in Tennessee, allowing citizens to carry concealed guns, and tightening eligibility requirements for TennCare.

Crowe owns two patents: U.S. Patents 5,601,605 (February 11, 1997) for an infant pacifier - fluid administering unit and 5,772,685 (June 30, 1998) for an infant pacifier-fluid administering unit.

== State Government ==
Crowe was first elected in 1990 to the 97th General Assembly as a write-in Democratic candidate, but switched to the Republican Party in 1996. Crowe serves as the chair of the General Welfare, Health & Human Resources Committee, serves as a member of the Senate Education Committee, Select Oversight Committee on Education, Government Operations Committee, and as chair of the Joint Select Committee on Veterans Affairs.
