= Bill Ketron =

American politician (born 1953)

Mayor of Rutherford County
- In office September 1, 2018 – August 30, 2022
- Preceded by: Ernest Burgess
- Succeeded by: Joe Carr

Member of the Tennessee Senate from the 13th district
- In office January 2003 – August 31, 2018
- Preceded by: Gene Elsea
- Succeeded by: Dawn White

Personal details
- Born: September 4, 1953 (age 73) Kingsport, Tennessee, U.S.
- Party: Republican
- Spouse: Theresa Fallaw (m. 1983)
- Children: 1
- Education: Middle Tennessee State University (BS)

Bill Ketron, Jr. (born September 4, 1953) is a Tennessee politician who was the Mayor of Rutherford County, previously serving as a member of the Tennessee Senate for the 13th district, which was composed of Lincoln, Marshall, and Maury counties, as well as part of Rutherford County from 2003 to his resignation in 2018. He won the August 2 general election for mayor and assumed office on September 1, 2018, resigning from the Senate on the previous day. In the May 3, 2022 Republican primary, Ketron lost reelection to former state representative Joe Carr, who went on to win the general election to succeed him.

== Personal background ==
Ketron was born in Kingsport, Tennessee and grew up in Murfreesboro, Tennessee. He graduated from Central High School in Murfreesboro in 1971 and Middle Tennessee State University in 1976 with a Bachelor of Science degree in political science and history. He is the owner of Universal International Insurance, a small business in Murfreesboro.

He married Theresa Fallaw in 1983. Their daughter, Kelsey (born 1990), attends Middle Tennessee State University, and the family attends First United Methodist Church in Murfreesboro.

== Political career ==
Bill Ketron has served as a state senator since being elected to the 103rd Tennessee General Assembly. He served as the Deputy Speaker of the Senate, the chairman of the Senate State and Local Government Committee, and a member of the following committees: the Senate Commerce, Labor and Agriculture; Senate Education; Senate Ethics; and Joint Long Term Care Oversight. He previously held office as a member of the Rutherford County commission from 1990 to 1998. He is a member of the 106th Tennessee General Assembly, the 2010 regular session of which convened on January 25, 2010. He will be up for re-election this year.

He supported Rick Perry for the Republican Party's nomination in the presidential election of 2012.

In February 2011, Ketron and State Rep. Judd Matheny introduced legislation to outlaw sharia law in the state.

In March 2013, Ketron and Matheny drew national attention after inquiring whether a new floor-level sink in the Tennessee state capitol had been installed to allow Muslims to wash their feet before praying. According to state officials, the sink is meant to make it easier for custodial staff to fill buckets and clean mops.

On May 1, 2018, Ketron won the Republican primary for the Rutherford County Mayoral nomination. Ketron won the August 2 general election, defeating his opponent Heather Ann Brown with 24,013 votes to her 14,575 votes. He was sworn into office on September 1, 2018.

On May 3, 2022, Ketron lost renomination for mayor in the Republican primary, placing third behind former state representative Joe Carr, who placed first in the primary with 6,862 votes, and second place finisher Rhonda Allen, who earned 6,239 votes. Ketron received 4,487 votes. Carr went on to win the general election for mayor on August 4, 2022.

== Public image ==
In June 2018, a fraud complaint was filed against Universal International Insurance, of which Ketron is owner and president. The complaint alleges that the company's vice-president, Kelsey Ketron, fraudulently accepted payment for a homeowner's insurance policy, without obtaining the policy, and at a time when she did not possess a valid license to do so. A civil lawsuit is pending in Rutherford County Circuit Court against the company.
