= Roscoe Dixon =

American politician (1949–2021)

Member of the Tennessee Senate from the 33rd district
- In office 1994–2005

Member of the Tennessee House of Representatives from the 87th district
- In office 1978–1994

Personal details
- Born: September 20, 1949 Gilmore, Arkansas, U.S.
- Died: April 15, 2021 (aged 71) Memphis, Tennessee, U.S.
- Party: Democratic
- Spouse: Gloria Dobbins
- Profession: Public Relations

Roscoe Dixon (September 20, 1949 – April 15, 2021) was an American politician in the state of Tennessee. Dixon lived in Memphis, Tennessee and was involved with the public relations business. He served in the Tennessee House of Representatives from 1978 to 1994 and in the Tennessee Senate from 1994 to 2005. He was arrested and charged in Operation Tennessee Waltz in 2005. Dixon was sentenced to 5 years and 3 months in prison on corruption charges. He died at the age of 71 on April 15, 2021, in a hospital, in Memphis, Tennessee.
