= Tennessee's 3rd Senate district =

American legislative district

Tennessee's 3rd State Senate district
Senator
Rusty Crowe; R–Johnson City
- Demographics: 89% White; 3% Black; 3% Hispanic; 1% Asian; 3% Multiracial
- Population (2022): 207,579

Tennessee's 3rd Senate district is one of 33 districts in the Tennessee Senate. It has been represented by Republican Rusty Crowe since 1990.

== Geography ==
District 3 is based in Johnson City, the southernmost Tri-Cities, covering all of Johnson, Washington, and Carter County. Other communities in the district include Elizabethton, Jonesborough, Erwin, Oak Grove, and Unicoi.

The district is located entirely within Tennessee's 1st congressional district, and overlaps with the 3rd, 4th, 6th, and 7th districts of the Tennessee House of Representatives. It borders the state of North Carolina.

== Recent election results ==
Tennessee Senators are elected to staggered four-year terms, with odd-numbered districts holding elections in midterm years and even-numbered districts holding elections in presidential years.

=== 2018 ===
2018 Tennessee Senate election, District 3
Party	Candidate	Votes	%
Republican	Rusty Crowe (incumbent)	50,236	100
Total votes		50,236	100
Republican hold			

=== 2014 ===
2014 Tennessee Senate election, District 3
Party	Candidate	Votes	%
Republican	Rusty Crowe (incumbent)	32,508	100
Total votes		32,508	100
Republican hold			

=== Federal and statewide results ===
Year	Office	Results
2020	President	Trump 70.9 - 27.4%
2020	Senate	Hagerty 71.8 - 26.1%
2016	President	Trump 72.5 – 23.4%
2012	President	Romney 70.0 – 28.2%
2012	Senate	Corker 74.6 – 20.6%
