= Tennessee's 11th Senate district =

American legislative district

Tennessee's 11th State Senate district
Senator
Bo Watson; R–Hixson
- Demographics: 75% White; 16% Black; 4% Hispanic; 1% Asian; 3% Multiracial
- Population (2022): 214,068

Tennessee's 11th Senate district is one of 33 districts in the Tennessee Senate. It has been represented by Republican Bo Watson since 2006.

== Geography ==
District 11 is based in the northern suburbs of Chattanooga in Hamilton County, including some of the city proper as well as Soddy-Daisy, Middle Valley, Signal Mountain, Harrison, and part of Collegedale and Red Bank.

The district is located entirely within Tennessee's 3rd congressional district, and overlaps with the 26th, 27th, 28th, 29th, and 30th districts of the Tennessee House of Representatives.

== Recent election results ==
Tennessee Senators are elected to staggered four-year terms, with odd-numbered districts holding elections in midterm years and even-numbered districts holding elections in presidential years.

=== 2018 ===
2018 Tennessee Senate election, District 11
Party	Candidate	Votes	%
Republican	Bo Watson (incumbent)	51,082	65.1
Democratic	Randall Price	27,332	34.9
Total votes		78,414	100
Republican hold			

=== 2014 ===
2014 Tennessee Senate election, District 11
Party	Candidate	Votes	%
Republican	Bo Watson (incumbent)	37,386	100
Total votes		37,386	100
Republican hold			

=== Federal and statewide results ===
Year	Office	Results
2020	President	Trump 61.6 – 36.4%
2016	President	Trump 63.7 – 31.4%
2012	President	Romney 64.3 – 34.0%
2012	Senate	Corker 73.4 – 23.6%
