= Tennessee's 33rd Senate district =

American legislative district

Tennessee's 33rd State Senate district
Senator
London Lamar; D–Memphis
- Demographics: 14% White; 73% Black; 10% Hispanic; 2% Asian; 1% Multiracial
- Population (2022): 200,706

Tennessee's 33rd Senate district is one of 33 districts in the Tennessee Senate. It has been represented by Democrat London Lamar since 2022, following her appointment by the Shelby County Commission after Katrina Robinson was expelled by the Senate. By most measures, it is the most Democratic-leaning district in the state.

== Geography ==
District 33 is based in South and Southwest Memphis, also covering small parts of Collierville and other Shelby County areas.

The district is located almost entirely within Tennessee's 9th congressional district, with a very small section extending into the 8th district. It overlaps with the 83rd, 84th, 85th, 87th, 91st, and 93rd districts of the Tennessee House of Representatives, and borders the state of Mississippi.

=== 2018 ===
2018 Tennessee Senate election, District 33
Primary election
Party	Candidate	Votes	%
Democratic	Katrina Robinson	14,164	68.7
Democratic	Reginald Tate (incumbent)	6,464	31.3
Total votes		20,628	100
General election
Democratic	Katrina Robinson	42,992	100
Total votes		42,992	100
Democratic hold			

=== 2014 ===
2014 Tennessee Senate election, District 33
Party	Candidate	Votes	%
Democratic	Reginald Tate (incumbent)	24,839	100
Total votes		24,839	100
Democratic hold			

=== Federal and statewide results ===
Year	Office	Results
2020	President	Biden 84.2 – 14.1%
2016	President	Clinton 84.4 – 13.6%
2012	President	Obama 85.3 – 14.2%
2012	Senate	Clayton 75.2 – 20.9%
