= Tennessee's 9th Senate district =

American legislative district

Tennessee's 9th State Senate district
Senator
Steve Southerland; R–Morristown
- Demographics: 88% White; 2% Black; 6% Hispanic; 1% Asian; 2% Multiracial
- Population (2022): 213,474

Tennessee's 9th Senate district is one of 33 districts in the Tennessee Senate. It has been represented by Republican Steve Southerland since 2003. Before 2022 redistricting, the district was mainly located where the current 1st district is now.

== Geography ==
District 9 is located to the northeast of Knoxville, and stretches to areas outside of the Tri-Cities region. It includes parts of the Morristown Metropolitan Area. It covers Sevier, Greene, Hamblen, Cocke, and Unicoi counties. Some notable cities in the district include Morristown, Newport, Gatlinburg, and Greeneville.

== Recent election results ==
Tennessee Senators are elected to staggered four-year terms, with odd-numbered districts holding elections in midterm years and even-numbered districts holding elections in presidential years.

=== 2018 ===
2018 Tennessee Senate election, District 1
Party	Candidate	Votes	%
Republican	Steve Southerland (incumbent)	43,262	100
Total votes		43,262	100
Republican hold			

=== 2014 ===
2014 Tennessee Senate election, District 1
Party	Candidate	Votes	%
Republican	Steve Southerland (incumbent)	29,698	100
Total votes		29,698	100
Republican hold			

=== Federal and statewide results ===
Year	Office	Results
2020	President	Trump 78.8 - 19.5%
2020	Senate	Hagerty 79.5 - 18.2%
2016	President	Trump 78.9 – 17.8%
2012	President	Romney 73.1 – 25.3%
2012	Senate	Corker 78.0 – 18.0%
