= Lincoln Davis =

American politician (born 1943)

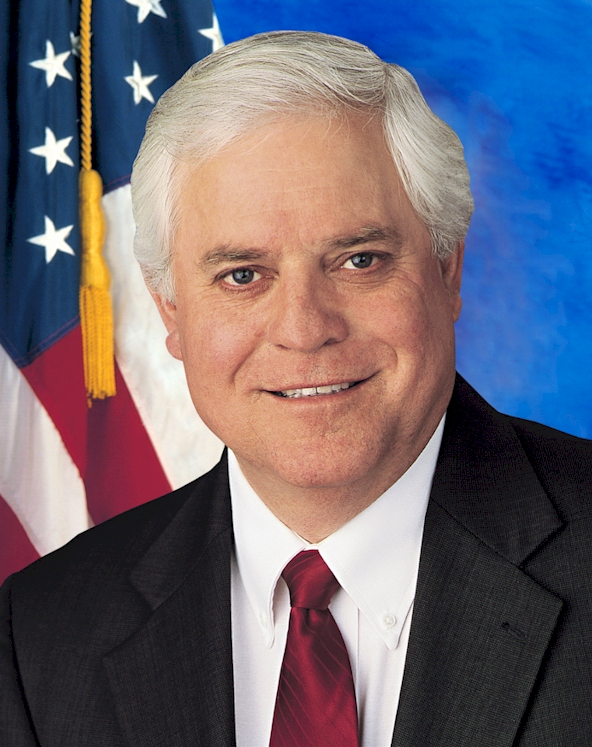

Member of the U.S. House of Representatives from Tennessee's 4th district
- In office January 3, 2003 – January 3, 2011
- Preceded by: Van Hilleary
- Succeeded by: Scott DesJarlais

Member of the Tennessee Senate from the 12th district
- In office 1996–2002
- Preceded by: Anna O'Brien
- Succeeded by: Tommy Kilby

Member of the Tennessee House of Representatives from the 38th district
- In office 1980–1984
- Preceded by: Robert Beaty
- Succeeded by: Leslie Winningham

Personal details
- Born: Lincoln Edward Davis; September 13, 1943 (age 82) near Pall Mall, Tennessee, U.S.
- Party: Democratic
- Spouse: Lynda Davis
- Children: 3
- Education: Tennessee Tech University (BS)

Lincoln Edward Davis (born September 13, 1943) is an American politician and businessman who served as the U.S. representative for Tennessee's 4th congressional district from 2003 to 2011. Prior to his election to Congress, Davis served in the Tennessee General Assembly from 1980 to 2002. A member of the Democratic Party, he is a member of the ReFormers Caucus of Issue One.

== Early life, education and career ==
Davis has spent most of his life in Fentress County, a mostly rural county in the state's coal-mining region. He graduated from Tennessee Tech in 1966 with a degree in agriculture. Davis, who now lives in the rural Fentress County village of Pall Mall, also owns a construction business, Diversified Construction Co., which builds homes, apartments, and offices. Davis and his wife Lynda, a now retired elementary school teacher, have three daughters, Larissa, Lynn and Libby, and five grandchildren.

== Early political career ==
Davis began his political career in 1978, when he was elected mayor of Byrdstown. Midway through his term as mayor, he was elected to the Tennessee House of Representatives, where he served two terms. He represented the 38th district. He gave up the seat in 1984 to run for the Democratic nomination in the 6th District when Al Gore gave it up to make a successful run for the United States Senate. He narrowly lost the primary to state Democratic Party chairman Bart Gordon. Ten years later, he ran for the Democratic nomination in the 4th District after Jim Cooper gave up the seat to make an unsuccessful run for Gore's Senate seat. He lost narrowly again, this time to one of Cooper's former assistants, Jeff Whorley, who in turn lost the general election to Republican Van Hilleary. In 1996, he was elected to the Tennessee State Senate and served two terms there. He represented the 12th district.

While in the Tennessee General Assembly, Davis supported state employee and teacher pay raises, long-term care for senior citizens, character education in schools and new domestic violence legislation. Davis initiated and fought for a bill requiring counseling and a 12-hour holding period for domestic violence offenders.

== U.S. House of Representatives ==
=== Committee assignments ===
- Committee on Appropriations
  - Subcommittee on Agriculture, Rural Development, Food and Drug Administration, and Related Agencies
  - Subcommittee on Energy and Water Development
- Committee on Science and Technology
  - Subcommittee on Energy and Environment
  - Subcommittee on Investigations and Oversight

=== Caucus membership ===
- Caucus to Control Methamphetamine
- Congressional Rural Caucus
- Blue Dog Coalition

Davis is considered a conservative Democrat. Davis made headlines for his opposition to the Federal Marriage Amendment. He is also known for his opposition to bailing out Wall Street and cap-and-trade legislation. Davis spent time focusing on funding abandoned coal mines in Tennessee. He has supported efforts to fund long-term care for senior citizens and has advocated new domestic violence legislation.

He opposes abortion and gun control, stances typical of most Democrats from rural areas of the state. During his first run for Congress, he vowed not to allow his Republican opponents to "outgun me, outpray me or outfamily me." In April 2009, Davis voted against the Matthew Shepard and James Byrd Jr. Hate Crimes Prevention Act.

== Political campaigns ==
=== 2002 ===
Midway through his second term in the State Senate, in 2002, Davis ran for the Democratic nomination in the 4th District when four-term Republican incumbent Van Hilleary gave up the seat to make what would ultimately be an unsuccessful run for governor. This time, he narrowly won the primary against a self-funding opponent, Fran Marcum of Tullahoma, who spent nearly $2 million in the race. He went on to win a hard-fought battle in the general election, narrowly defeating Republican Tullahoma Alderman Janice Bowling, 52%-47%; Bowling was Hilleary's district director.

=== 2004 ===
Davis was reelected in a 2004 rematch against Bowling with slightly less difficulty, 55%-44%.

=== 2006 ===
Davis faced nominal opposition in 2006. Although the 4th was not considered safe for either major party, its size (it stretches across two time zones and five television markets) made it very difficult to unseat an incumbent.

Davis defeated Republican Kenneth Martin, 67.5%-32.5%.

=== 2008 ===
Davis did not make an endorsement of the candidate in advance of the 2008 Democratic National Convention. Hillary Clinton won the primary in his district by a significant margin, and John McCain outran Barack Obama there by 29 percentage points.

In the November 2008 general election, Davis defeated Republican candidate Monty Lankford, a hospital equipment company owner. Afterwards Davis was appointed to the House Appropriations Committee and the Energy & Water Subcommittee.

=== 2010 ===
Davis was considered a possible candidate for Governor of Tennessee in 2010. However, he announced that he had decided not to seek that office in January 2009, and instead ran for reelection to his House seat.

In the 2010 congressional race, Davis was challenged by Republican Scott DesJarlais. Also on the ballot were independents Paul H. Curtis, James Gray, Richard S. Johnson, and Gerald York. DesJarlais won 57.1% of the vote to Davis's 38.6%--the third-largest margin of defeat for a Democratic incumbent in the 2010 cycle, the first time an incumbent had been unseated since the district's creation in 1983, and the first time since 1974 that an incumbent congressman in Tennessee lost a general election.

== Voting incident ==
In the wake of Tennessee passing a strict voter identification law in 2011, Davis was denied the right to vote in Fentress County on Super Tuesday in March 2012. Davis had voted in the county for about fifteen years but was purged from the roll of registered voters.

U.S. House of Representatives
Preceded by Van Hilleary	Member of the U.S. House of Representatives from Tennessee's 4th congressional district 2003–2011	Succeeded by Scott DesJarlais
U.S. order of precedence (ceremonial)
Preceded by Van Hilleary as Former U.S. Representative	Order of precedence of the United States as Former U.S. Representative	Succeeded by Diane Black as Former U.S. Representative
