= Tennessee House of Representatives 70th district =

State legislative district in Tennessee

Tennessee's 70th State House of Representatives district
- Map of Tennessee House districts with the 70th District shaded in red
Representative
Clay Doggett; R–Pulaski
since 2019
- Demographics: 87.8% White; 4.4% Black; 3.1% Hispanic; 0.7% Asian; 3.7% Multiracial
- Population (2024): 71,996

The Tennessee House of Representatives 70th district is one of the 99 legislative districts in the lower house of the Tennessee General Assembly. The district is located in Middle Tennessee and covers all of Giles, and parts of Lawrence and Lincoln counties. The district includes St. Joseph, Loretto, Pulaski, and Ardmore. It also includes Elkton, Minor Hill, and Lynnville. The rest of the district is unincorporated and mostly rural. Clay Doggett has represented the district since 2019.

== Demographics ==
The Tennessee Comptroller estimates the population as of 2024 at 71,996.

- 87.8% of the district is White
- 4.4% of the district is Black
- 3.1% of the district is Hispanic
- 0.7% of the district is Asian
- 0.4% of the district is some other race alone
- 3.7% of the district is Two or more races

Detailed demographic information is also available through Census Reporter.

== History ==
The 88th Tennessee General Assembly was the first in which all districts were numbered. At this time, the 70th district was in Wayne, Hardin, and McNairy counties. From the 89th-92nd GAs, it was composed of Chester, Hardeman, Hardin, and McNairy counties. At the 93rd GA, it was composed of Humphreys, Lawrence, Lewis and Perry counties. From the 94th-97th GA, it was composed of Lawrence, Lewis and Maury counties. From the 98th-102nd GAs, it was composed of it was composed of Lawrence, Lewis, and parts of Maury and Wayne counties. From the 103rd-107th GAs, it was composed of Lawrence, Lewis, and part of Wayne counties. From the 108th-112th GAs, it was composed of Giles and part of Lawrence counties. Since the 113th General Assembly, it has been composed of all of Giles, and parts of Lawrence and Lincoln counties.

== List of Representatives ==
Representative	Party	Years of Service	General Assembly	Hometown
Clay Doggett	Republican	2019-present	111th-114th	Pulaski
Barry Doss	Republican	2013-2018	108th-110th	Leoma
Joey Hensley	Republican	2003-2012	103rd-107th	Hohenwald
John M. White	Democratic	1995-2002	99th-102nd	Lawrenceburg
Calvin M. Moore	Democratic	1987-1994	95th-98th	West Point
Robert V. Gafford	Democratic	1983-1986	93rd-94th	Hohenwald
Herman Wolfe Sr.	Republican	1977-1982	90th-92nd	Savannah
Ray Bodiford	Republican	1973-1976	88th-89th	Selmer
