= Senator Kyle =

Senator Kyle may refer to:

- James H. Kyle (1854–1901), U.S. Senator from South Dakota
- Jim Kyle (born 1950), Tennessee State Senate
- John C. Kyle (1851–1913), Mississippi State Senate
- John W. Kyle (1891–1965), Mississippi State Senate
- Sara Kyle (born 1952), Tennessee State Senate

== See also ==
- Jon Kyl (1942–2026), U.S. Senator from Arizona
- Vernon Kyhl (1908–1973), Iowa State Senate
