= Beverly Marrero =

American politician (born 1939)

Member of the Tennessee Senate from the 30th district
- In office March 14, 2007 – January 8, 2013
- Preceded by: Shea Flinn
- Succeeded by: Jim Kyle

Member of the Tennessee House of Representatives from the 89th district
- In office January 13, 2004 – March 14, 2007
- Preceded by: Carol Chumney
- Succeeded by: Jeanne Richardson

Personal details
- Born: January 23, 1939 (age 87) Memphis, Tennessee, U.S.
- Party: Democratic
- Education: University of Tennessee
- Profession: Retired real estate consultant

Beverly Robison Marrero (born January 23, 1939) is an American politician and a Democratic member of the Tennessee Senate District 30, which is a part of Shelby County. She was first elected to the 103rd General Assembly in the House by-election after Rep. Carol Chumney resigned to become a member of the Memphis City Council.

In the House, she was Secretary of the Children and Family Affairs Committee, and a member of the Government Operations Committee. She chairs the Family Justice Subcommittee, and is a member of the Health and Human Resources Committee, the Domestic Relations Subcommittee, and the Public Health and Family Assistance Subcommittee. At the 1976 Democratic National Convention, she represented Tennessee on the Rules Committee. She is a member of the Tennessee Economic Council on Women.

In March 2007, Marrero won special election for the state senate seat vacated by newly elected U.S. Representative Steve Cohen. She is currently the Vice Chair of the Government Operations Committee and serves of the Judiciary Committee for the 2007 Legislative Session.

Beverly Marrero was one of only seven members of the House to vote against a measure to hold a referendum advocating amending the Tennessee State Constitution to ban gay marriage. In April 2006, in the Public Health and Family Assistance Subcommittee, Marrero voted against another proposed amendment that would have removed all guarantees of a right to an abortion from the state constitution. Marrero also sponsored a bill to stop death penalty executions for three years, while a newly created committee would perform a study of the fairness of death penalty administration.

Before entering politics, Beverly Marrero was a real estate consultant. She began politics working for the election of John F. Kennedy by going door to door in her neighborhood. She worked in Tennessee, Missouri, Ohio, and New Hampshire for Jimmy Carter's campaign.
