= Advisory Commission on Intergovernmental Relations =

Advisory Commission on Intergovernmental Relations may refer to:

In United States federal government

- U.S. Advisory Commission on Intergovernmental Relations

In United States state government

- Connecticut Advisory Commission on Intergovernmental Relations
- Indiana Advisory Commission on Intergovernmental Relations
- Louisiana Advisory Commission on Intergovernmental Relations
- North Dakota Advisory Commission on Intergovernmental Relations
- Tennessee Advisory Commission on Intergovernmental Relations
- Texas Advisory Commission on Intergovernmental Relations
- Virginia Advisory Commission on Intergovernmental Relations
