= Jim Kyle =

American politician (born 1950)

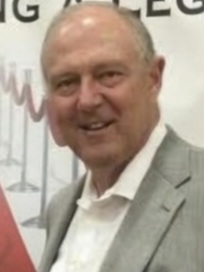
- Kyle in 2014

Member of the Tennessee Senate from the 30th district
- In office January 8, 2013 – August 29, 2014
- Preceded by: Beverly Marrero
- Succeeded by: Sara Kyle

Member of the Tennessee Senate from the 28th district
- In office January 11, 1983 – January 8, 2013
- Succeeded by: Joey Hensley

Personal details
- Born: James Fellow Kyle, Jr. October 14, 1950 (age 76) Memphis, Tennessee, U.S.
- Party: Democratic
- Spouse: Sara Kyle
- Children: 4
- Education: Arkansas State University, University of Memphis Cecil C. Humphreys School of Law
- Profession: Attorney
- Website: Official website

James Fellow Kyle, Jr. (born October 14, 1950) is an American lawyer and politician. He is a former member of the Tennessee Senate for the 30th district, which is composed of part of Memphis. He served as a state senator in the 93rd - 108th Tennessee General Assemblies. He was elected Democratic leader in the Senate beginning in the 104th General Assembly. In 2014, he was elected to serve as Chancellor in Chancery Court Part II in Shelby County, Tennessee.

== Biography ==
Kyle graduated from Arkansas State University in 1973 with a Bachelor of Science degree in marketing. He was a member of Tau Kappa Epsilon fraternity and a recipient of the Distinguished Service Award at graduation. In 1976, he obtained a J.D. from the University of Memphis School of Law.

During the 95th General Assembly, Kyle was the Democratic Caucus Chairman, and during the 96th through 100th General Assemblies, he was the Chairman of the Select Oversight Committee on Corrections. Senator Kyle holds membership on the Senate Finance, Calendar, Judiciary, Rules, Delayed Bills Committees.

He is married to Sara Kyle who served as Chairman of the Tennessee Regulatory Authority which is similar to most states' Public Service Commissions. They have four children.

Kyle is a member of the Memphis Bar Association. From 1994 to 1998, he served on the Board of Governors of the American Correctional Association. He is also a member of Ducks Unlimited and serves on the Board of the University of Memphis Law School Alumni Association. Jim Kyle was a member of the law firm of Domico Kyle, PLLC in Memphis, Tennessee.

Kyle served as Senate Minority leader in the Tennessee State Senate.

Kyle filed paperwork to seek the Democratic nomination to run for Governor of Tennessee on July 2, 2009, but withdrew from the campaign in February of the following year.
