= Senator Kilby =

Senator Kilby may refer to:

- Thomas Kilby (1865–1943), Alabama State Senate
- Tommy Kilby (born 1964), Tennessee State Senate
