= Senator Flinn =

Senator Flinn may refer to:

- Shea Flinn (born 1973), Tennessee State Senate
- William Flinn (1851–1924), Pennsylvania State Senate

== See also ==
- Senator Flynn (disambiguation)
