= Steve Cohen (politician) =

American politician (born 1949)

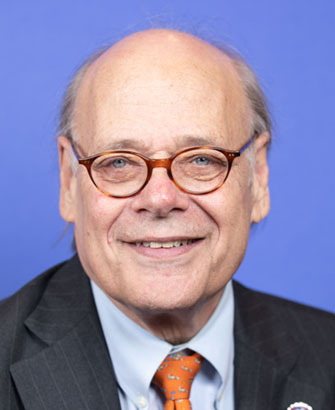
- Official portrait, 2023

Member of the U.S. House of Representatives from Tennessee's 9th district
- Incumbent
- Assumed office January 3, 2007
- Preceded by: Harold Ford Jr.

Member of the Tennessee Senate from the 30th district
- In office January 11, 1983 – December 1, 2006
- Preceded by: Jim White
- Succeeded by: Shea Flinn

Personal details
- Born: Stephen Ira Cohen; May 24, 1949 (age 77) Memphis, Tennessee, U.S.
- Party: Democratic
- Education: Vanderbilt University (BA); University of Memphis (JD)
- Website: House website Campaign website
- Cohen's voice Cohen on the lack of bipartisan support for voting rights legislation. Recorded June 25, 2014

Stephen Ira Cohen (born May 24, 1949) is an American attorney and politician serving as the U.S. representative from Tennessee's 9th congressional district, a majority-minority district centered in Memphis, since 2007. Previously, he served in the Tennessee Senate from 1983 to 2006. He is a member of the Democratic Party.

A progressive, Cohen was first elected to the U.S. House of Representatives in 2006. He is the first Jewish person to represent Tennessee in Congress, and one of the few Jewish members of Congress to have represented a majority-black district. He has repeatedly faced electoral challenges from opponents who argued that the district should be represented by a black lawmaker, but has consistently won reelection since 2006.

Since 2023, Cohen is the only Democrat in Tennessee's congressional delegation. Cohen will retire from the House in 2027 after announcing that he would not run for re-election in 2026 due to the Tennessee redistricting.

== Early life and education ==
Cohen was born in Memphis, Tennessee, on May 24, 1949, the son of Genevieve (née Goldsand) and pediatrician Morris David Cohen. He has two older brothers, Michael Corey and Martin D. Cohen. He is a fourth-generation Memphian and a grandson of Jewish immigrants from Lithuania, Poland and Turkey. One of his grandfathers owned a newsstand. Cohen contracted polio when he was five, and the disease caused him to shift his attention from sports to politics at an early age. When he was 11, John F. Kennedy made a campaign stop in Memphis, and Cohen took a picture of Kennedy sitting on a convertible. Cohen describes Kennedy as his political hero; the picture still hangs in his office.

In 1961, Cohen's family moved to Coral Gables, Florida, where his father took a residency in psychiatry at the University of Miami. From 1964 to 1966, the Cohens lived in Pasadena, California, where Dr. Cohen completed a fellowship in pediatric psychiatry at the University of Southern California. Cohen, who had been attending Polytechnic School in Pasadena, returned to Florida in 1966 to graduate from Coral Gables Senior High School before returning to Memphis where his father had established his private psychiatry practice.

Cohen graduated from Vanderbilt University in 1971 with a Bachelor of Arts degree. At Vanderbilt, he was a member of the Alpha Gamma chapter of the Zeta Beta Tau fraternity. In 1973, he graduated from the Memphis State University College of Law (now the University of Memphis Cecil C. Humphreys School of Law) with a Juris Doctor.

== Personal life ==
Cohen is unmarried and lives in a Midtown neighborhood.

== Early career ==
From 1978 to 2006, Cohen was the sole practitioner of his own law firm, practicing civil and criminal law.

While serving as a legal advisor for the Memphis Police Department from 1975 to 1978, Cohen rose to political prominence when he was elected vice president of the Tennessee Constitutional Convention of 1977 at age 27. Cohen was then elected to serve as a commissioner on the Shelby County Commission, serving from 1978 to 1980. During his time at the commission, he was instrumental in the creation of The Med, a community-funded regional hospital. In 1980, Cohen served as an interim Shelby County General Sessions Court judge. He has also served as a delegate to the 1980, 1992, and 2004 through 2016 Democratic National Conventions.

=== Tennessee Senate ===
Cohen was elected to the Tennessee Senate in 1982, representing the 30th district, which includes parts of Memphis. He held that position for 24 years.

For 18 years, Cohen strove to repeal the ban on lotteries in the Tennessee State Constitution. His efforts were successful in 2002, and a state lottery program designed to provide college scholarships for Tennessee students was adopted the following year. The lottery program is the best-known accomplishment of Cohen's Senate career, having raised over $2 billion for scholarships, afterschool programs, pre-K, technical center grants, and energy-saving capital programs in K-12 schools as of 2012. Cohen also sponsored legislation relating to expansion of community access to healthcare, protection of animal rights, reinstatement of voting rights, graduated driver licenses, and funding for the arts. He sponsored the T-Bo law, the nation's first-ever statute providing for damages up to $5,000 in cases of intentional or negligent acts resulting in the death of a companion dog or cat. He has won six awards from the Humane Society as of 2011.

Cohen sponsored and passed legislation providing funding for the construction of the Autozone Park baseball stadium, creating the Holocaust Commission, and providing permanent funding for the arts with Tennesseans for the Arts license plates. He was awarded the Bill of Rights Award from the American Civil Liberties Union and the Bird Dog Award for Ethics from Tennessee Common Cause in 1992.

In 1994, Cohen ran for governor of Tennessee, but finished fifth in the Democratic primary with 4.95% of the vote. The nominee, Phil Bredesen, lost the general election to U.S. Representative Don Sundquist, but succeeded Sundquist in 2003.

In March 2005, Cohen was one of three members of the Tennessee Senate to vote against the Tennessee Marriage Protection Amendment, which prohibited same-sex marriage statewide and was approved by Tennessee voters via a referendum in November 2006. During debate on the amendment, he offered several amendments to it, all of which failed, including the proposed addition of an "adultery clause", which said, "Adultery is deemed to be a threat to the institution of marriage and contrary to public policy in Tennessee." Cohen won the Political Leadership Award from the Human Rights Campaign.

== U.S. House of Representatives ==
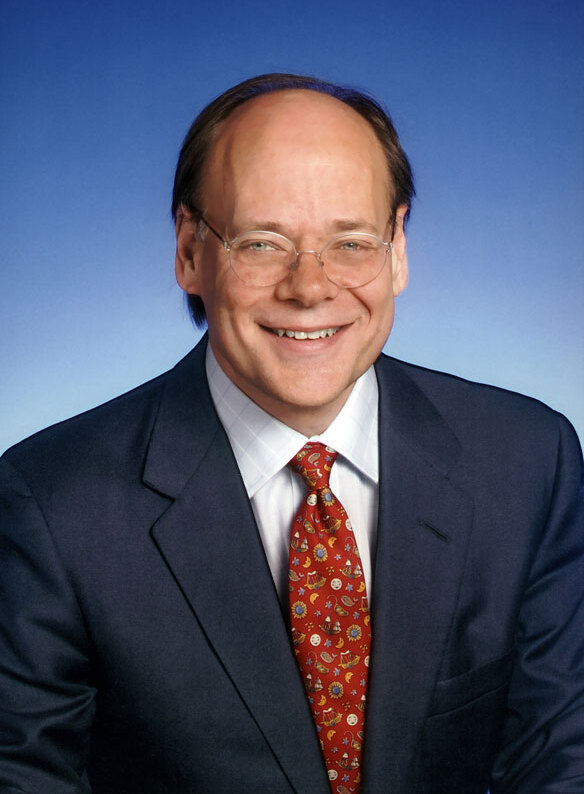
Cohen during the 110th United States Congress

=== Elections ===
==== 1996 ====
Cohen ran for the United States House of Representatives seat for the 9th district in 1996, when 22-year incumbent Harold Ford, Sr. retired. The then 26-year-old Harold Ford, Jr., the incumbent's son, was his opponent in the Democratic primary. Reflecting on the race, Cohen said, "I'd spent 14 years in the [state] Senate, had the experience, and didn't like the idea of [the seat] being handed down like an heirloom."

Cohen lost the primary to Ford by 25 points. Noting that Ford, an African-American, did much better than Cohen in majority black precincts despite his inexperience, Cohen said, "It is impossible for a person who is not African American to get a large vote in the African American community... against a substantial candidate. The fact is, I am white, and it doesn't seem to matter what you do." Later, he admitted that his statement was "impolitic" but also noted that "race is still an important factor in voting."

Cohen returned to the State Senate after the election. Tennessee state senators serve staggered four-year terms, and Cohen did not have to run for reelection to the Senate until 1998.

==== 2006 ====
In 2006, Cohen ran again for the 9th district seat; Ford was not running for reelection. Cohen was the first candidate in the race with significant name recognition outside the Memphis area, but had 14 opponents in the primary. The Commercial Appeal, Memphis's daily newspaper, endorsed Cohen in the race. The crowded primary was largely due to the district's demographics. The 9th is a heavily Democratic, black-majority district, and it was considered very likely that whoever won the primary would be the district's next representative.

Cohen won the August 3 primary by a 4,000-vote margin, despite being outspent 2 to 1 by the runner-up. In fact, six Democrats raised more money than he did. He carried many of the district's predominantly black precincts by healthy margins. He faced Republican Mark White and independent Jake Ford (the younger brother of Harold Ford, Jr.) in the general election in November.

Though the ninth district is heavily Democrat, Jake Ford was seen as a serious contender for the race because of his significant name recognition among Memphis's black voters. Ford had skipped the Democratic primary because he felt it was too crowded, but said he would caucus with the Democrats if elected. The Ford family has been a significant force in Memphis's black community since the days of E.H. Crump. It seemed that the real race was between Cohen and Ford. White was not a serious factor, and would have faced nearly impossible odds even in a two-way race with Cohen.

Cohen was endorsed by the mayor of Memphis, W. W. Herenton, and the mayor of Shelby County, A.C. Wharton, both of whom are black and members of the Democratic Party. He was also endorsed by many local Democratic activists who had long felt that Harold Ford, Jr. was too moderate.

But many of the city's politically influential black pastors refused to support Cohen, and the area Black Ministers Association overwhelmingly voted to endorse Jake Ford. The Ford family itself was split. While Harold Ford, Jr. remained neutral (despite rumors of collusion between the brothers' campaigns), their cousin Joe Ford, Jr., an entertainment lawyer, strongly endorsed Cohen after finishing third in the primary. Harold Ford, Sr. strongly supported his younger son.

On October 8, 2006, Cohen, Ford, and White participated in a televised debate in Memphis. Issues discussed included Iraq, medical marijuana, education, and the Tennessee Marriage Protection Amendment. Ford attacked Cohen's record in the State Senate, including his opposition to the Marriage Protection Amendment, support for medical marijuana, and his voting attendance record. Cohen responded by standing by his public record, pointing out Ford's lack of experience in public office, and indicating that Ford had been to jail and had dropped out of high school.

Cohen won the election by a decisive margin, with 60% of the vote to Ford's 22% and White's 18%. Sixty percent of Cohen's votes were from African-Americans.

==== 2008 ====
Despite Cohen's strong performance in the black community, many of the city's politically active black leaders felt chagrined at being represented by him. Besides some sentiment that the 9th should be represented by a black Democrat, his socially liberal views also gave them pause. For example, Cohen's support for a hate-crimes bill drew particularly strong opposition from most of the city's black ministers because it included a sexual orientation provision. Cohen noted that every member of the Congressional Black Caucus voted for the bill, and Harold Ford, Jr. had voted for it in the previous Congress. Still, many of the city's black ministers tried to rally behind a consensus black candidate to challenge Cohen in the Democratic primary.

Cohen faced four challengers in the August 7 primary. His major opponent was Nikki Tinker, a lawyer who had finished second to Cohen in the 2006 primary and a former aide to Harold Ford, Jr. Tinker received the endorsement of the city's Black Ministerial Association.

At a June 2008 campaign event, then-Speaker Nancy Pelosi called Cohen "the conscience of the freshman class", adding, "He is a progressive and an important member of the Transportation Committee, which provides the infrastructure for jobs that will make America more competitive in the global economy."

The campaign quickly turned ugly, with Tinker putting together a raft of negative ads. One attacked Cohen for voting against a proposal that would have removed a statue and the remains of Nathan Bedford Forrest, a Confederate lieutenant-general who was involved in the founding of the Ku Klux Klan, from the Medical Center park. The ad falsely implied that Cohen had ties to the Klan by juxtaposing him with a white-clad Klansman. Another ad accused Cohen of "praying in our churches" while voting against school prayer during his tenure in the State Senate. Tinker's campaign later removed the ads from its YouTube account amid criticism from a number of sources.

On the day the primary was held, Barack Obama denounced Tinker's ads, saying they "have no place in our politics, and will do nothing to help the good people of Tennessee." Harold Ford, Jr. also denounced the ads.

The primary had been marred by antisemitic rhetoric for months before the August vote. In February 2008, Rev. George Brooks, a Tinker supporter, distributed literature in the district that stated that "Cohen and the Jews HATE Jesus" and urged the defeat of an "opponent of Christ and Christianity." Another minister, Robert Poindexter of Mt. Moriah Baptist Church, said he was supporting Tinker because Cohen was "not black, and he can't represent me. That's just the bottom line."

Cohen won the primary with 79% of the vote to Tinker's 19%. In his victory speech, he said his victory proved "Memphis has come a long, long way" from its racially divisive past. The win virtually assured him of a second term; no Republican even filed, and any Republican challenger would have faced nearly impossible odds. Cohen was reelected with 87.9% of the vote against three independent challengers, including Jake Ford (who won 4.8%).

Cohen endorsed Barack Obama in the 2008 Democratic presidential primary on February 4, 2008, the day before the Super Tuesday primaries. On September 10, 2008, while speaking on the House floor, Cohen compared Obama's work as a community organizer to Jesus' work.

==== 2010 ====
Former Memphis Mayor Willie Herenton challenged Cohen in the 2010 Democratic primary. In a guest column in the Memphis Commercial Appeal, Herenton wrote that while he hoped the campaign would focus on issues rather than race or religion, "it remains a fact that the 9th congressional district provides the only real opportunity to elect a qualified African-American to the all-white 11-member delegation representing Tennessee in Washington." Herenton also denied having supported Cohen in his 2006 bid against Jake Ford, writing, "I did not support Steve Cohen the individual for the 9th congressional district. I supported an idea that was bigger than him as an individual. I supported the principle of fairness." During the 2006 campaign, Herenton endorsed Cohen, saying, "Steve Cohen is the best-qualified candidate for this leadership role". While Cohen's commanding win in the 2008 primary suggested that he had strong support among the district's African-American community, Herenton was easily his highest-profile opponent to date.

In September 2009, Herenton drew controversy when he said in a radio interview that Cohen "really does not think very much of African-Americans" and that "[Cohen]'s played the black community well." In addition, Herenton's campaign manager Sidney Chism told The New York Times that Cohen's Memphis-area seat "was set aside for people who look like me. It wasn't set aside for a Jew or a Christian. It was set aside so that blacks could have representation." The National Jewish Democratic Council (NJDC) criticized Herenton for these remarks, calling them "unacceptable in a Democratic primary or anywhere in our political discourse."

Obama endorsed Cohen for reelection, saying, "Congressman Cohen is a proven leader in the United States Congress and a strong voice for Tennessee. Together, we passed historic health care reform and together we're continuing the fight to renew our economy and bring jobs back to the American people. I am proud to stand with Steve and support his reelection to Congress."

In the unofficial election results, Cohen won 79% of the vote to Herenton's 21%. It was the first time Herenton, elected to a record five terms as mayor, lost a race for public office. This all but assured Cohen a third term. In the general election, Cohen defeated Republican challenger Charlotte Bergmann, taking 74% of the vote to Bergmann's 25%.

==== 2012 ====
Cohen was challenged in the Democratic Primary by Tomeka Hart, an African-American member of the Memphis School Board and Memphis Urban League President who was undefeated in elections up to that point. Cohen won the primary with 89.2% of the vote on August 2, 2012—the highest vote total in the district in recent history and the highest percentage vote for a white candidate running for office in a majority African-American district in history.

Obama endorsed Cohen on April 5, 2012, saying, "Congressman Steve Cohen has worked with me on jobs bills, health care, and other issues of importance to the middle class. He also never fails to pitch me on the city of Memphis, whether it's Booker T. Washington High School, Memphis basketball, or barbecue. I urge you to vote for Steve Cohen, a tireless advocate for the 9th district". In the general election, Cohen defeated Republican businessman George Flinn, winning 75% of the vote.

=== Tenure ===
Cohen has a lifetime rating of 4.3 from the American Conservative Union; for most of his tenure he has had the lowest ACU rating of any lawmaker from Tennessee.

He is the first Jew to represent Tennessee in Congress, the first white Democrat to represent a significant portion of Memphis since freshman George W. Grider was defeated by Republican Dan Kuykendall in 1966, the first Jew to represent a majority black district, and one of the few white congressmen to have represented a black-majority district. Before being elected, Cohen told reporters that he would seek to become the first white member of the Congressional Black Caucus, but later decided against joining after members of the CBC (influenced by co-founder Bill Clay) indicated that they would not allow a non-black to join.

In September 2025, Cohen rejected calls to step aside amidst "generational change" and concerns over his age and told Axios that he is "not worried" about a primary challenge, adding that it would "be a mistake for somebody to run against me, whoever succeeds me will probably ... be somebody whom I choose to endorse." He further alleged that New York Representative Jerry Nadler retired not for generational change but because he had "been slipping for a while".

==== Book curriculum ====
In January 2022, when the board of trustees of McMinn County Schools in Tennessee, in a 10-0 decision, removed the Pulitzer Prize-winning Holocaust graphic novel Maus from its curriculum for 8th grade English classes, overriding a state curriculum decision, Cohen was critical of the decision and said he hoped to see it reversed.

==== Budget ====
Cohen voted against prioritizing spending in the event the debt limit was reached. He voted to create an $825 billion economic recovery package as well as an additional $192 billion anti-recession stimulus in 2009. He supported additional stimulus packages and bailouts, such as the GM and Chrysler bailout.

Cohen supports raising Senate salaries. He also supports extending unemployment benefits from 39 weeks to 59 weeks. He opposes any move to privatize Social Security.

==== Gun control ====
Cohen supports a ban on private gun sales without a background check and on "fire sales" of firearms, but supports the right to bear concealed firearms. He also supports educating children on gun safety through a school program. Cohen was also one of 80 House members to sign a letter to President Barack Obama urging him to ban the importation of military-style semiautomatic firearms.

==== Energy ====
To expand funds available for research and development of alternative energy sources, Cohen supports an excess profits tax on oil companies. He supports investments in solar, wind, and hybrid cars. He also supports offering tax credits and incentives to companies that adopt renewable and clean energy methods. He supports the regulation of oil and gas prices and seeks to criminalize oil cartels like OPEC. He opposes offshore drilling and seeks to revoke tax incentives for exploration of oil and gas.

==== Environment ====
Cohen is a member of the Congressional Progressive Caucus. He supports environmental conservation. He opposed a resolution that would bar the EPA from regulating emissions, and opposes allowing offshore drilling. He also supports the expansion of public transportation and train lines.

Cohen has said there are several more animal species that should be classified as endangered and thus receive protection. He believes outdoor classroom experiences should be expanded through massive federal funding.

==== Healthcare ====
Cohen believes adequate healthcare is a basic right and has opposed any cuts to healthcare funding. He has voted several times to extend healthcare coverage through federal funding.

On May 10, 2012, at a House subcommittee hearing on asbestos trust transparency legislation, Cohen described plaintiff's attorneys who contacted him about the illness of his friend Warren Zevon as "parasites." He said that Zevon—who died from asbestos-related cancer—did not seek a lawyer and did not want damages. In spite of Cohen's feelings, he spoke against the bill.

==== Immigration ====
In June 2017, Cohen voted against the No Sanctuary for Criminals Act, which would have penalized jurisdictions that limit cooperation with federal immigration enforcement and expanded mandatory detention requirements.

==== Cannabis ====
Cohen has supported a number of efforts to legalize cannabis in Congress. He cosponsored the Ending Federal Marijuana Prohibition Act when it was first introduced in 2011 and every year that it has subsequently been introduced. Other legislation he has cosponsored include the Regulate Marijuana Like Alcohol Act, Marijuana Justice Act, Marijuana Freedom and Opportunity Act, and the Marijuana Opportunity Reinvestment and Expungement (MORE) Act. Cohen has also introduced the CARERS Act in multiple years (2015, 2017, and 2019) to legalize the medical use of cannabis. He was the headline speaker at Marijuana Policy Project's annual gala in January 2010.

==== Government reform ====
Cohen supports limiting campaign donations and disclosure of amounts coming from lobbyists.

During his first month in Congress, Cohen supported the "100-Hour Plan" in the House, which included raising the federal minimum wage, requiring the Secretary of Health and Human Services to negotiate lower Medicare prescription drug prices, and reducing interest rates for student borrowers. He also cosponsored House Concurrent Resolution 23, which "[expresses] the sense of Congress that the President should not order an escalation in the total number of members of the United States Armed Forces serving in Iraq."

On February 27, 2007, Cohen introduced a resolution in the House that apologizes for African-American slavery and the system of Jim Crow laws that persisted for 100 years after the abolition of slavery. He noted that no president has officially apologized for allowing slavery. The bill had 36 cosponsors. The resolution passed on July 29, 2008, marking the first time a branch of the federal government had officially apologized for the institution of slavery and its aftermath. Cohen was honored with the D. Emelio Castelar Work Recognition Award by the Vida Foundation in Madrid, Spain for his work on the slavery apology bill and served as the keynote speaker for their international symposium on the abolition of slavery and the slave trade.

Cohen supported the Open Book on Equal Access to Justice Act (H.R. 2919; 113th Congress), a bill that would require the Administrative Conference of the United States (ACUS) to prepare a report each year on the amount of fees and other expenses awarded by federal courts to nonfederal entities when they prevail in a case against the United States. An original co-sponsor of the bill, he argued that "Americans have a right to know what their government is doing and their government has a duty to be as transparent as possible."

Cohen is one of the 19 members of the House Committee on the Judiciary who voted against H.J. Res. 11 118th Congress which would have allowed a floor vote on term limits for Congress. Recent surveys by termlimits.com show 83% of Americans favor term limits for Congress.

==== Civil rights ====
Cohen received the American Bar Association's Day Award along with Representative John Lewis and Senators Olympia Snowe and Richard Lugar. The ABA recognized him for his efforts to improve access to the justice system by providing more funding for the Legal Services Corporation, which provides legal counsel for low income individuals and families. Cohen dedicated the award to Dr. Benjamin Hooks and Dr. Dorothy Height during his acceptance speech.

Cohen sponsored the SPEECH Act banning the practice of libel tourism, rendering libel lawsuits unenforceable if the judgments were issued in a nation where the legal standard for libel is set lower than our own. The Senate Sponsor was Senator Patrick Leahy. The bill passed both houses of Congress in July 2010 and was signed into law by President Barack Obama the following month.

==== Abortion ====
Cohen supports legal abortion. He opposes the repeal of federally funded abortions and supports a focus on preventing pregnancies with the availability of emergency contraceptives if needed.

==== Iraq War ====
In 2006, he opposed Republican policy regarding the War in Iraq.

Cohen made a trip to Iraq from October 4 to 7, 2007, as part of a congressional fact-finding delegation. He said that his impression was that Iraq was "not in very good shape" and that its economy has been "ravaged." Cohen met with soldiers who complained that long deployments are causing divorces. When he raised this concern with General David Petraeus, Petraeus told him that the claims were being exaggerated. After meeting with Prime Minister Nouri al-Maliki, Cohen described him as "overly optimistic", noting his "bizarre" statement that sectarian war in Iraq was over.

==== Afghanistan infrastructure ====
In 2012, Cohen sponsored the Cohen Amendment reducing infrastructure funding to Afghanistan. The Afghan Infrastructure Fund has been plagued with problems, with millions of taxpayer dollars disappearing. When another member of the House said the funding was essential to bringing our troops home, Cohen replied, "The truth of the matter is that it has nothing to do with whether we can bring our troops home or not. The truth is that we cannot account for where this money is going, and it is likely going into the pockets of the top one-half of one percent in Afghanistan. The infrastructure holds up well enough there to deploy and redeploy our troops, so it's good enough to bring them home permanently." The amendment passed 228–191 and is the first piece of legislation reducing funding to Afghanistan.

==== National Guard & Reservist Debt Relief Extension Act ====
Cohen sponsored and co-authored, along with J. Randy Forbes, Dana Rohrabacher, Jan Schakowsky, and Jerrold Nadler, The National Guard & Reservist Debt Relief Extension Act, which allows qualifying members of the National Guard and reservists to bypass the often onerous means testing required under current bankruptcy law if their financial hardships were caused by deployment. President Obama signed the bill into law in December 2011.

==== Judicial recommendations ====
House Speaker Nancy Pelosi assigned Cohen to serve on the House Judiciary Committee, which was his first choice for a committee assignment, as well as the House Transportation and Infrastructure Committee.

As there are no Democratic U.S. Senators from Tennessee, President Obama asked Cohen to recommend judicial nominees. Cohen recommended Bernice Donald for the Sixth Circuit Court of Appeals alongside John Fowlkes and Sheryl H. Lipman for District Court Judge for the Western District of Tennessee. All three have been confirmed by the United States Senate.

==== TVA recommendations ====
Cohen recommended Bishop William Graves, V. Lynn Evans, and Ron Walter for the Board of Directors at the Tennessee Valley Authority. All three were nominated by President Obama and confirmed by the Senate. They are the only African-Americans on the TVA Board. Evans and Walter, both from Shelby County, represent the only time two residents of Shelby County have been on the TVA Board simultaneously.

==== U.S. Attorney ====
Cohen recommended Ed Stanton III to President Obama as U.S. Attorney for Tennessee's Western District. Stanton was confirmed in August 2010.

==== Votes ====
Cohen has sponsored 16 bills since January 4, 2007, of which 13 died in committee and two were enacted. He has co-sponsored 762 bills during the same period.

==== Big River Crossing ====
Cohen announced in 2012 that Memphis was to be awarded a $15 million TIGER IV Grant for the Main Street to Main Street Multi-Modal Connector Project. The project added a dedicated sidewalk to the Harahan Bridge connecting Tennessee to Arkansas, allowing people to walk or bicycle over the Mississippi River. The project drew praise from many in the business community, including FedEx founder Fred Smith. Construction of the walkway, which was named the Big River Crossing was completed in 2016.

==== Helsinki Commission ====
Democratic Leader Nancy Pelosi appointed Cohen to the Helsinki Commission in 2011. "Congressman Steve Cohen is a leader in promoting civil rights and opportunity of all Americans, and he brings this same passion to the promotion of human rights and democracy around the world", she said. "The Helsinki Commission is a focal point for security and cooperation among nations and leaders, and Congressman Cohen's voice is sure to strengthen and advance the commission's work."

==== Armenian issues ====
Although his family has no knowledge of any Turkish heritage, Cohen's mother's birth certificate states his maternal grandfather was born in Turkey when it was part of the Ottoman Empire. He is a member of the Congressional Caucus on US Turkish Relations and Turkish Americans. He had consistently opposed congressional recognition of the Armenian genocide on pragmatic grounds, believing that recognizing it officially in Congress would damage relations with Turkey.

On August 6, 2008, one day before the Democratic Congressional Primary, a confrontation between California-based documentary filmmaker Peter Musurlian and Cohen erupted. During a press conference at Cohen's home, Musurlian was asked to leave by Cohen's staff and Cohen himself. Cohen then put both hands on Musurlian's arms and forced him out of the home after Musurlian refused to leave.

In October 2017, Aram Hamparian, executive director of the Armenian National Committee of America, said, "Reps. Stivers, Cohen, and Sessions—in stripping out language about the Armenian Genocide from a bill about Turkish-Armenian relations—are, effectively, carrying Turkish President Erdogan’s water in Washington, advancing his shameful denial campaign even as he’s doubling down on his government’s anti-American actions and attitudes."

==== 2011 Nazi controversy ====
In a speech on the House floor on January 18, 2011, Cohen said of the Republican effort to repeal the Obama administration's health care reform law:

They say it's a government takeover of health care, a big lie just like Goebbels. You say it enough, you repeat the lie, you repeat the lie, you repeat the lie and eventually, people believe it. Like blood libel. That's the same kind of thing. The Germans said enough about the Jews and the people believed it and you had the Holocaust. You tell a lie over and over again. And we've heard on this floor, government takeover of health care.

According to Cohen's hometown paper, the Memphis Commercial Appeal, he was "accused of upsetting the newfound atmosphere of civility in the House" following the assassination attempt on Representative Gabby Giffords. Republicans, as well as many in the media and in the Jewish community, expressed outrage and demanded that Democrats condemn Cohen's comment. Ron Kampeas of the Jewish Telegraphic Agency wrote that "someone needs to carpet Cohen, pronto, for his rhetoric." His remarks were also condemned by the National Jewish Democratic Council, which issued a statement saying that "invoking the Holocaust to make a political point is never acceptable—on either side of the aisle. Cohen's comments and similar comments made by others are not helpful as our leaders and citizens conduct a joint effort to advance civility in our political discourse. We implore Cohen and all our leaders to choose their words carefully as we move forward."

In response to the controversy, Cohen said, "I said Goebbels lied about the Jews, and that led to the Holocaust. Not in any way whatsoever was I comparing Republicans to Nazis. I was saying lies are wrong."

Cohen later expressed regret for his remarks:

I would certainly never do anything to diminish the horror of the Nazi Holocaust as I revere and respect the history of my people. I sponsored legislation which created one of the first state Holocaust Commissions in America and actively served as a Commission member for over 20 years. I regret that anyone in the Jewish Community, my Republican colleagues or anyone else was offended by the portrayal of my comments. My comments were not directed toward any group or people but at the false message and, specifically, the method by which it has been delivered.

==== Boycott of Benjamin Netanyahu's speech to Congress ====
In March 2015, Cohen boycotted the speech of the Prime Minister of Israel to Congress, writing: "While Americans and members of Congress may disagree on anything, even foreign policy, providing a forum of such immense prestige and power to the leader of another country who is opposing our nation's foreign policy is beyond the pale. It endangers the negotiations, insults the good faith of the other nations involved in the negotiations and emboldens Iran who may well view this schism in our government as an opportunity for advantage. While we can disagree with our President, we as a nation should be as one on our foreign policy and any disagreements should be presented in a respectful, appropriate and time-honored manner."

In response, Israeli journalist Caroline Glick wrote in an opinion column in the Jerusalem Post: "Radical leftist representatives who happen to be Jewish, like Jan Schakowsky of suburban Chicago and Steve Cohen of Memphis, are joining Netanyahu's boycotters in order to give the patina of Jewish legitimacy to an administration whose central foreign policy threatens the viability of the Jewish state."

Cohen later attended a separate speech given by Netanyahu in 2024.

==== Impeachment matters ====
In 2009, Cohen was in the unanimous majority voting to adopt all four articles of impeachment against Judge Samuel B. Kent. All House members participating in the vote voted in favor of each article, with the exception of one member who voted "present" on the fourth article. In 2010, he was also in the unanimous majority that approved all four articles of impeachment against Judge Thomas Porteous. He was also appointed and served as an impeachment manager for Porteous's impeachment trial.

On August 17, 2017, Cohen stated plans to bring forward articles of impeachment against President Donald Trump owing to Trump's series of comments about a white nationalist rally in Charlottesville, Virginia, five days earlier. Cohen stated on his website:

I believe the President should be impeached and removed from office. Instead of unequivocally condemning hateful actions by neo-Nazis, white nationalists and Klansmen following a national tragedy, the President said "there were very fine people on both sides." There are no good Nazis. There are no good Klansmen.

On August 15, Trump had commented on the rally, saying that there were "very fine people on both sides" but explicitly excluding "the neo-Nazis and the white nationalists, because they should be condemned totally". No articles of impeachment were introduced at this point.

On October 31, 2019, Cohen voted for the resolution to establish procedures for public hearings in the then-ongoing impeachment inquiry against Donald Trump. On December 18, 2019, Cohen voted for both articles of impeachment against Trump in Trump's first impeachment.

On June 30, 2020, Cohen and 35 cosponsors introduced a resolution (H.Res.1032) on the House floor calling for the impeachment of Attorney General William Barr for many instances of alleged malfeasance.

On January 13, 2021, Cohen voted for the article of impeachment in the second impeachment of Donald Trump.

In May 2026 Cohen introduced six Articles of Impeachment against Supreme Court Chief Justice John Roberts for "committing high crimes and misdemeanors by violating the Constitution, disregarding his statutory obligations as Chief Justice, and breaching his oaths of office".

==== "Holocaust distortion" ====
On April 25, 2018, 57 House members, including Cohen, released a condemnation of what they called "Holocaust distortion" in Ukraine and Poland. They criticized Poland's new Holocaust law, which would criminalize accusing Poles of complicity in the Holocaust, and Ukraine's 2015 memory laws glorifying the Ukrainian Insurgent Army (UPA) and its pro-Nazi leaders, such as Roman Shukhevych.

==== Russian meddling ====
In July 2018, Cohen said that Russian interference in the 2016 United States elections amounted to "an act of war", which the U.S. needed to counter with "cyber attacks against the Kremlin". Speaking to Hill.TV's Buck Sexton and Krystal Ball, he argued that Russia "invaded our country" by attacking free elections, and thus should be "crippled" by a retributory cyber attack that would have "made Russian society valueless".

==== Israel ====
Cohen voted to provide Israel with support following the October 7 attacks.

=== Media ===
Cohen has been interviewed on The Colbert Report and was a frequent guest on MSNBC's Up with Chris Hayes and Current TV's The Young Turks. He has also appeared on Conspiracy Theory with Jesse Ventura, where Ventura confronted him for co-sponsoring H.R. 645, which directs the secretary of homeland security to establish national emergency centers, otherwise known as Federal Emergency Management Agency (FEMA) camp facilities, on military installations.

During the 2013 State of the Union Address, Cohen became the subject of media attention when he accidentally tweeted at model Victoria Brink, "pleased u r watching. ilu". After deleting the tweet, he explained to reporters that Brink was his daughter and that he only learned of her three years prior. In July 2013, CNN facilitated a DNA test with Cohen, Brink, and the man who raised her, John Brink. The test revealed that John Brink was, in fact, Victoria's father. Cohen said in a statement he "was stunned and dismayed".

During a 2018 open congressional hearing featuring FBI agent Peter Strzok, Cohen said, "If I could give you a Purple Heart, I would... This has been an attack on you and a way to attack Mr. Mueller and the investigation that is to get at Russian collusion involved in our election." Veteran groups criticized his comment, as the Purple Heart is given to wounded soldiers. Cohen apologized for his comments, saying "I regret mentioning the Purple Heart medal at yesterday's hearing. My intent was to speak metaphorically to make a broader point about attacks against the FBI and Special Counsel Mueller's investigation into a Russian attack on our country." In 2019, Cohen branded Attorney General William Barr "Chicken Barr" after Barr did not appear for a House Judiciary Committee hearing, during which Cohen ate from a bucket of Kentucky Fried Chicken to highlight the absence. In 2025, Cohen appeared in the 5th episode of the second season of Nathan Fielder's docu-comedy The Rehearsal.

=== Committee assignments ===
For the 119th Congress:

- Committee on the Judiciary
  - Subcommittee on the Constitution and Limited Government
  - Subcommittee on Crime and Federal Government Surveillance
  - Subcommittee on Immigration Integrity, Security, and Enforcement
- Permanent Select Committee on Intelligence
  - Subcommittee on National Security Agency and Cyber
  - Subcommittee on Open Source Intelligence

=== Caucus memberships ===
- Congressional Caucus on Turkey and Turkish Americans
- Congressional Progressive Caucus (until 2024)
- Congressional UK Caucus
- Congressional Equality Caucus
- United States Congressional International Conservation Caucus
- Congressional Arts Caucus
- House Baltic Caucus
- Congressional Freethought Caucus
- Congressional Ukraine Caucus
- U.S.-Japan Caucus
- Rare Disease Caucus

== Electoral history ==
=== Tennessee Senate ===
Tennessee's 30th state senate district results, 1984
Party	Candidate	Votes	%
Democratic	Steve Cohen (incumbent)	27,206	100%
Total votes		27,206	100
Democratic hold			

Tennessee's 30th state senate district results, 1988
Party	Candidate	Votes	%
Democratic	Steve Cohen (incumbent)	28,788	68.59%
Republican	Lynn Cobb	13,181	31.41%
Total votes		41,969	100
Democratic hold			

Tennessee's 30th state senate district results, 1992
Party	Candidate	Votes	%
Democratic	Steve Cohen (incumbent)	37,368	62.79%
Republican	Bill Davis	22,148	37.21%
Total votes		59,516	100
Democratic hold			

Tennessee's 30th state senate district results, 1996
Party	Candidate	Votes	%
Democratic	Steve Cohen (incumbent)	38,015	99.86%
Write-in		53	0.14%
Total votes		38,068	100
Democratic hold			

Tennessee's 30th state senate district results, 2000
Party	Candidate	Votes	%
Democratic	Steve Cohen (incumbent)	34,490	81.79%
Independent	Charles Lewis	7,679	18.21%
Total votes		42,169	100
Democratic hold			

Tennessee's 30th state senate district results, 2004
Party	Candidate	Votes	%
Democratic	Steve Cohen (incumbent)	42,254	67.20%
Republican	Johnny Hatcher, Jr.	14,736	23.44%
Independent	Mary Taylor-Shelby Wright	5,887	9.36%
Total votes		62,877	100
Democratic hold			

=== U.S. House of Representatives ===
Tennessee's 9th congressional district Democratic primary results, 1996
Party	Candidate	Votes	%
Democratic	Harold Ford Jr.	63,888	60.46%
Democratic	Steve Cohen	35,844	33.92%
Democratic	Rufus Jones	5,244	4.96%
Democratic	Tracy Rainey	312	0.30%
Democratic	Isaac Richmond	292	0.28%
Democratic	Robert Knox	88	0.08%
Total votes		105,668	100%

Tennessee's 9th congressional district elections, 2006
Primary election
Party	Candidate	Votes	%
Democratic	Steve Cohen	23,629	30.94%
Democratic	Nikki Tinker	19,164	25.10%
Democratic	Joseph S. Ford Jr.	9,334	12.22%
Democratic	Julian Bolton	8,055	10.55%
Democratic	Ed Stanton	6,927	9.07%
Democratic	Ron Redwing	2,169	2.84%
Democratic	Marvell Mitchell	1,804	2.36%
Democratic	Ralph White	1,700	2.23%
Democratic	Joseph Kyles	1,336	1.75%
Democratic	scattered	2,241	2.93%
Total votes		76,359	100%
General election
Democratic	Steve Cohen	103,341	59.88%
Independent	Jake Ford	38,243	22.16%
Republican	Mark White	31,002	17.96%
Total votes		172,586	100%
Democratic hold			

Tennessee's 9th congressional district elections, 2008
Primary election
Party	Candidate	Votes	%
Democratic	Steve Cohen (incumbent)	50,306	79.36%
Democratic	Nikki Tinker	11,817	18.64%
Democratic	Joe Towns Jr.	914	1.44%
Democratic	scattered	352	0.56%
Total votes		63,389	100%
General election
Democratic	Steve Cohen (incumbent)	198,798	87.85%
Independent	Jake Ford	11,003	4.86%
Independent	Dewey Clark	10,047	4.44%
Independent	Taylor Shelby Wright	6,434	2.84%
Total votes		226,282	100%
Democratic hold			

Tennessee's 9th congressional district elections, 2010
Primary election
Party	Candidate	Votes	%
Democratic	Steve Cohen (incumbent)	63,402	78.71%
Democratic	Willie Herenton	17,153	21.29%
Total votes		80,555	100%
General election
Democratic	Steve Cohen (incumbent)	99,827	74.00%
Republican	Charlotte Bergmann	33,879	25.11%
Independent	Sandra Sullivan	673	0.50%
Independent	Perry Steele	528	0.39%
Total votes		134,907	100%
Democratic hold			

Tennessee's 9th congressional district elections, 2012
Primary election
Party	Candidate	Votes	%
Democratic	Steve Cohen (incumbent)	49,585	89.30%
Democratic	Tomeka Hart	5,944	10.70%
Total votes		55,529	100%
General election
Democratic	Steve Cohen (incumbent)	188,422	75.07%
Republican	George Flinn Jr.	59,742	23.80%
Independent	Gregory Joiner	1,448	0.58%
Independent	Brian Saulsberry	1,372	0.55%
Write-in		4	0.00%
Total votes		250,984	100%
Democratic hold			

Tennessee's 9th congressional district elections, 2014
Primary election
Party	Candidate	Votes	%
Democratic	Steve Cohen (incumbent)	45,423	66.18%
Democratic	Ricky Wilkins	22,336	32.54%
Democratic	Isaac Richmond	876	1.28%
Total votes		68,635	100%
General election
Democratic	Steve Cohen (incumbent)	87,376	74.97%
Republican	Charlotte Bergmann	27,173	23.31%
Independent	Floyd Wayne Alberson	766	0.66%
Independent	Paul Cook	752	0.65%
Independent	Herbert Bass	483	0.41%
Total votes		116,550	100%
Democratic hold			

Tennessee's 9th congressional district elections, 2016
Primary election
Party	Candidate	Votes	%
Democratic	Steve Cohen	35,645	85.55%
Democratic	Justin Ford	4,165	10.00%
Democratic	M. LaTroy Williams	1,452	3.48%
Democratic	Larry Crim	406	0.97%
Total votes		41,668	100%
General election
Democratic	Steve Cohen (incumbent)	171,631	78.75%
Republican	Wayne Alberson	41,123	18.87%
Independent	Paul Cook	5,203	2.39%
Total votes		217,957	100%
Democratic hold			

Tennessee's 9th congressional district elections, 2018
Primary election
Party	Candidate	Votes	%
Democratic	Steve Cohen (incumbent)	67,433	90.95%
Democratic	Kasandra Smith	4,734	6.38%
Democratic	Isaac Richmond	1,976	2.67%
Total votes		74,143	100%
General election
Democratic	Steve Cohen (incumbent)	145,139	79.98%
Republican	Charlotte Bergmann	34,901	19.23%
Independent	Leo AwGoWhat	1,436	0.79%
Total votes		181,476	100%
Democratic hold			

Tennessee's 9th congressional district elections, 2020
Primary election
Party	Candidate	Votes	%
Democratic	Steve Cohen (incumbent)	56,312	83.96%
Democratic	Corey Strong	9,994	14.90%
Democratic	Leo AwGoWhat	768	1.15%
Total votes		67,074	100%
General election
Democratic	Steve Cohen (incumbent)	187,905	77.37%
Republican	Charlotte Bergmann	48,818	20.10%
Independent	Dennis Clark	3,962	1.63%
Independent	Bobby Lyons	2,192	0.90%
Write-in		3	0.00%
Total votes		242,880	100%
Democratic hold			

Tennessee's 9th congressional district elections, 2022
Primary election
Party	Candidate	Votes	%
Democratic	Steve Cohen (incumbent)	62,055	88.02%
Democratic	Marion Latory Alexandria-Williams	8,449	11.98%
Write-in		2	0.00%
Total votes		70,506	100%
General election
Democratic	Steve Cohen (incumbent)	93,800	70.04%
Republican	Charlotte Bergmann	35,123	26.23%
Independent	George Flinn	3,349	2.50%
Independent	Dennis Clark	1,160	0.87%
Independent	Paul Cook	485	0.36%
Write-in		1	0.00%
Total votes		133,918	100%
Democratic hold			

Tennessee's 9th congressional district elections, 2024
Primary election
Party	Candidate	Votes	%
Democratic	Steve Cohen (incumbent)	30,042	73.71%
Democratic	Corey Strong	7,258	17.81%
Democratic	Marion Latory Alexandria-Williams	1,936	4.75%
Democratic	Kasandra Smith	1,523	3.74%
Total votes		40,759	100%
General election
Democratic	Steve Cohen (incumbent)	159,522	71.31%
Republican	Charlotte Bergmann	57,411	25.66%
Independent	Wells Blankenship	3,708	1.66%
Independent	Dennis Clark	3,062	1.37%
Total votes		223,703	100%
Democratic hold			

== See also ==
- List of Jewish members of the United States Congress

U.S. House of Representatives
Preceded by Harold Ford	Member of the U.S. House of Representatives from Tennessee's 9th congressional district 2007–present	Incumbent
U.S. order of precedence (ceremonial)
Preceded by Yvette Clarke	United States representatives by seniority 57th	Succeeded by Joe Courtney
Preceded by Yvette Clarke	Order of precedence of the United States	Succeeded by Gus Bilirakis
