= Shea Flinn =

American politician (born 1973)

Member of the Memphis City Council from the 9th district
- In office January 2008 – April 29, 2015
- Preceded by: Tom Marshall
- Succeeded by: Alan Crone

Member of the Tennessee Senate from the 30th district
- In office December 29, 2006 – March 14, 2007
- Preceded by: Steve Cohen
- Succeeded by: Beverly Marrero

Personal details
- Born: George Shea Flinn III; January 30, 1973 (age 53) Memphis, Tennessee, U.S.
- Party: Democratic
- Spouse: Amy Raiford
- Education: Rhodes College (BA); University of Memphis (JD)

George Shea Flinn III (born January 30, 1973) is an American attorney and Democratic Party politician who served as a member of the Tennessee Senate. When Steve Cohen resigned from the chamber shortly after his election to the United States House of Representatives, the Shelby County Commission appointed Flinn to fill the seat until a special election could be held. From 2007 to 2015, Flinn served on the Memphis City Council.

Flinn's father, George Flinn, is a Memphis physician who has run for Congress multiple times as a Republican.
