= Tommy Kilby =

American politician (born 1964)

Member of the Tennessee Senate from the 12th district
- In office April 15, 2003 – January 13, 2009
- Preceded by: Mike Walker
- Succeeded by: Ken Yager

Personal details
- Born: January 27, 1964 (age 62)
- Party: Democratic
- Spouse: Rachel Kilby
- Children: 3, including 2 stepchildren
- Education: Tusculum College (BS)
- Website: Senate website

Tommy Kilby (born January 27, 1964) is a Tennessee politician and a former member of the Tennessee Senate for the 12th district, which encompasses Campbell, Fentress, Morgan, Rhea, Roane, and Scott counties. He served as a state senator beginning with the 103rd Tennessee General Assembly. He was vice-chair of the Senate Transportation Committee and served as chairman of the Senate Environment, Conservation, and Tourism committee.

Tommy Kilby graduated from Oakdale High School in 1982 and attended Tusculum College. At age eighteen he was elected as a county commissioner in Morgan County, serving from 1982 to 1990. In 1994 he was elected county executive; he was re-elected to three unprecedented terms. He is a former member of the Board of Directors of the Morgan County Chamber of Commerce. He was a member and a vice chair of the East Tennessee Development District and East Tennessee Human Resource Agency.

In December 2006, Kilby announced that he would not run for re-election in 2008.

Currently Tommy Kilby is working at Oakdale High School as a history teacher.
