= Senator Flynn =

Senator Flynn may refer to:

- Carol Flynn (born 1933), Minnesota State Senate
- Gerald T. Flynn (1910–1990), Wisconsin State Senate
- James Flynn (politician) (born 1944), Wisconsin State Senate
- John E. Flynn (1912–2003), New York State Senate
- Marty Flynn (born 1975), Pennsylvania State Senate

== See also ==
- Senator Flinn (disambiguation)
