= Clay Doggett =

American politician (born 1983)

Member of the Tennessee House of Representatives from the 70th district
- Incumbent
- Assumed office January 8, 2019
- Preceded by: Barry Doss

Personal details
- Born: September 5, 1983 (age 43)
- Party: Republican
- Education: University of Alabama in Huntsville (BA)
- Website: Official website Campaign website

Clay Doggett (born September 5, 1983) is an American businessman, law enforcement officer, and politician from the state of Tennessee. A Republican, Doggett has represented the 70th district of the Tennessee House of Representatives, based in Giles and Lawrence Counties, since 2019.

== Career ==
Prior to running for office, Doggett worked in law enforcement as a correctional officer and a sheriff's deputy; he also is the founder and owner of a pressure washing company.

In 2017, Doggett announced he would run against Barry Doss, representative for the 70th district of the Tennessee House of Representatives, in the 2018 Republican primary. Running as a "grassroots conservative," Doggett narrowly ousted Doss 52-48% before winning the general election soundly over Democrat Jessica Yokley.

In 2020, Doggett ran unopposed in both the Republican primary and the general election, winning the general with 22,568 votes.

Doggett co-sponsored constitutional carry legislation during the 2021 session and was passed on April 12, 2021. He also sponsored the "Second Amendment Privacy and Protection Act of 2021", which prevents a state or local entity from creating a registry to track citizens who legally possess firearms in the state, and was passed on June 2, 2021. Both laws went into effect on July 1.

On December 30, 2021, Doggett announced he would run for his second re-election bid in 2022.

In 2023, Doggett supported a resolution to expel three Democratic lawmakers from the legislature for violating decorum rules. The expulsion was widely characterized as unprecedented.

=== Current committees ===
As of December 2021, Doggett sits on the following committees:

- Criminal Justice Subcommittee (Chair)
- Agriculture and Natural Resources Committee
- Criminal Justice Committee
- Health and Safety Committee of the Second Extraordinary Session
- Elections Committee of the Third Extraordinary Session

=== Electoral record ===
2018 Republican primary: Tennessee House of Representatives, District 70
Party	Candidate	Votes	%
Republican	Clay Doggett	5,362	51.5%
Republican	Barry Doss	5,057	48.5%

2018 general election: Tennessee House of Representatives, District 70
Party	Candidate	Votes	%
Republican	Clay Doggett	15,503	76.2%
Democratic	Jessica Yokley	4,363	21.5%
Independent	Roy Waldrop	471	2.3%

2020 Republican primary: Tennessee House of Representatives, District 70
Party	Candidate	Votes	%
Republican	Clay Doggett	7,001	100.0%

2020 general election: Tennessee House of Representatives, District 70
Party	Candidate	Votes	%
Republican	Clay Doggett	22,568	100.0%

== Personal life ==
Doggett lives in Pulaski with his wife, Mary, and their 3 children.
