= Ken Yager =

American politician (born 1947)

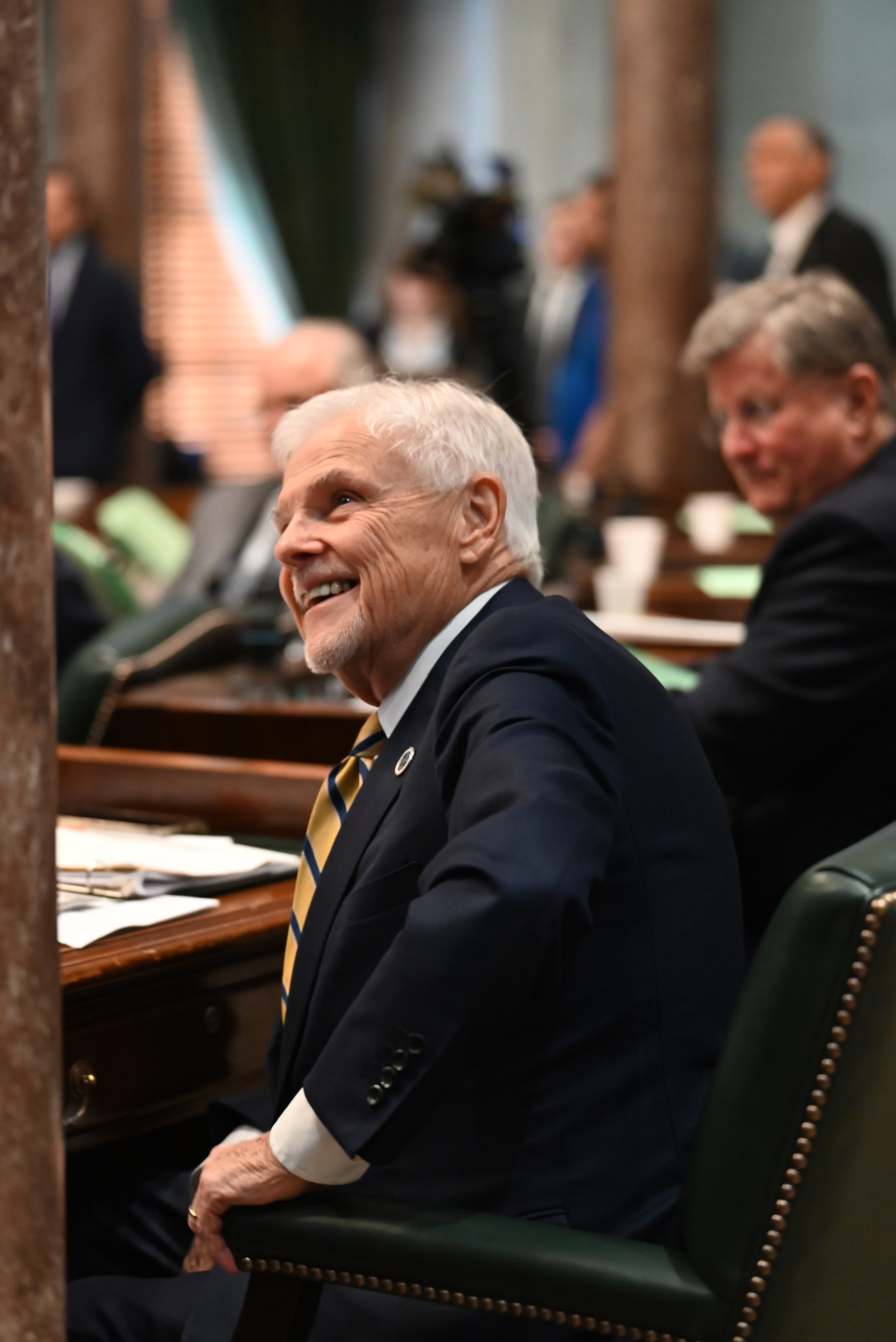
- Yager in 2024

Member of the Tennessee Senate from the 12th district
- Incumbent
- Assumed office January 13, 2009
- Preceded by: Tommy Kilby

Personal details
- Born: January 5, 1947 (age 79)
- Party: Republican
- Spouse: Malinda Raby
- Children: 2
- Education: University of Tennessee at Martin (BA, MS); University of Memphis (JD)
- Website: Campaign website

Kenneth E. Yager (born January 5, 1947) is an American politician currently serving as a Republican state senator in the Tennessee General Assembly. He represents Tennessee's 12th Senate district, which is made up of the counties of Campbell, Clay, Fentress, Macon, Morgan, Overton, Pickett, Roane, and Scott. Yager is chairman of the Tennessee Senate Republican Caucus.

== Early life and education ==
Yager was born on January 5, 1947. He received a B.A. from the University of Tennessee at Martin in 1969, a M.S. from the University of Tennessee at Martin in 1972, and a J.D. from the University of Memphis in 1977.

Yager worked as a teacher in Harriman, as the Roane County attorney, and as the Roane County executive.

== Political career ==
Yager defeated Becky Ruppe and Christopher Fenner to become the Tennessee state senator for District 12. He is currently serving his fifth term.

Yager has served on multiple committees throughout his tenure in the Senate. He is a current member of the Commerce and Labor Committee; the Finance, Ways and Means Committee; and the Fiscal Review Committee. He is also chair of the Tennessee Advisory Commission on Intergovernmental Relations.

Yager has been endorsed by both the Faith and Freedom Coalition, and the Tennessee State Employees Association.

== Personal life ==
Yager is married to the former Malinda Raby of Oliver Springs; together they have two adult children. Yager and his wife currently reside in Kingston and attend the First Baptist Church in Kingston, Tennessee.

In 2019, Roane State Community College named a building on their campus after Yager.

Yager was named 2023 "Man of the Year" by the Tennessee Men's Health Network. In 2024, he was photographed skydiving to both "celebrate [his] one year of being cancer-free and to raise awareness for prostate cancer".

On December 3, 2024, Yager was arrested on Jekyll Island in Glynn County, Georgia, for driving under the influence, hit and run, and failing to stop at a stop sign. He pleaded no contest in August 2025, resulting in the dismissal of several charges, including hit and run, duty of a driver to stop at or return to scene of accident, and failure to yield.
