= Tennessee Advisory Commission on Intergovernmental Relations =

Intergovernmental agency in Tennessee, United States

Agency overview
- Formed: July 1979
- Jurisdiction: State of Tennessee
- Employees: 21
- Agency executives: Senator Ken Yager, Chairman; Mayor Kevin Brooks, Vice Chairman; Cliff Lippard, Ph.D., Executive Director
- Website: https://www.tn.gov/content/tn/tacir.html

The Tennessee Advisory Commission on Intergovernmental Relations (TACIR) is an intergovernmental body of state and local governments in the U.S. state of Tennessee that has the purpose of providing a forum for discussion and resolution of intergovernmental problems and providing research support to improve the overall quality of government in that state. TACIR was established as a permanent nonpartisan body in 1978 by action of the Tennessee General Assembly.

Tennessee was one of several states that formed commissions on intergovernmental relations, patterned to some extent on the United States Advisory Commission on Intergovernmental Relations, during the 1970s and 1980s.

== Membership ==
The commission has 25 members, including 10 members and one appointee of the state legislature, 10 officials from local governments, two officials of the executive branch of the state government, and two private citizens. The legislative members are the chairmen of the Finance, Ways and Means committees of the two houses of the General Assembly, the Comptroller of the Treasury, four additional members of the Tennessee House of Representatives and four additional members of the Tennessee State Senate appointed to four-year terms. The local government members, all of whom are appointed to four-year terms, are four elected county officials, four elected municipal officials, one member nominated by the County Officials Association of Tennessee, and one member nominated by the state's development districts.

Current TACIR Members
Member	Term Expiration	Note
Legislative Members
Sen. Richard Briggs	November 2026	
Sen. Heidi Campbell (politician)	November 2026	
Sen. Ken Yager	November 2026	Chairman
Sen. Jeff Yarbro	November 2026	
Rep. John Crawford	November 2026	
Rep. Harold M. Love Jr.	November 2026	
Rep. Antonio Parkinson	November 2026	
Rep. Ryan Williams	November 2026	
Statutory Members
Sen. Bo Watson		Chair of the Senate Finance, Ways, and Means Committee
Rep. Gary Hicks		Chair of the House Finance, Ways, and Means Committee
Comptroller Jason Mumpower		Comptroller of the Treasury
Municipal Members
Mayor Kevin Brooks	June 2027	Mayor of Cleveland, Vice Chairman
Mayor Paige Brown	June 2027	Mayor of Gallatin
Councilman Chase Carlisle	June 2026	Councilman, City of Memphis
Vacant		Appointment Pending
County Members
Mayor Rogers Anderson	June 2027	Mayor of Williamson County
County Executive Jeff Huffman	June 2027	County Executive of Tipton County
Bob Rial	June 2027	Mayor of Dickson County
Larry Waters	June 2029	Mayor of Sevier County
Other Local Government Members
Mayor Terry Franks	June 2028	Mayor of Anderson County, representing the TN Development District Association
Mary Gaither	June 2027	Tipton County Clerk, representing the County Officials Association of Tennessee
Executive Branch Members
Commissioner Jim Bryson	June 2027	Commissioner, TN Department of Finance and Administration
Commissioner Deniece Thomas	June 2027	Commissioner, TN Department of Labor and Workforce Development
Private Citizens
Calvin Clifton	June 2027	Kingston, Tennessee
Jeff Peach	June 2027	Smyrna, Tennessee
