= Tennessee Public Utility Commission =

Agency overview
- Formed: 2017
- Jurisdiction: State of Tennessee
- Agency executives: Robin Morrison, Chairman; Kenneth Hill, Vice Chairman; Earl Taylor, Executive Director
- Website: https://www.tn.gov/content/tn/tpuc.html

The Tennessee Public Utility Commission (TPUC) is the Tennessee governmental unit charged with the responsibility of setting rates and service standards for privately owned telephone, natural gas, electric, and water utilities.

== History ==
The Tennessee Regulatory Authority (TRA) was established on July 1, 1996, following the shutdown of the Tennessee Public Service Commission.

When established, the TRA was headed by three directors, with the governor, lieutenant governor, and speaker of the Tennessee House of Representatives each appointing one director. The initial directors were H. Lynn Greer, Jr., Sara P. Kyle, and Melvin J. Malone. In 2002 a fourth director was added by the Tennessee General Assembly, to be appointed by joint agreement among the governor, lieutenant governor, and speaker of the House. Each director serves a six-year term. After 2008 the terms were required to be staggered.

In 2012, Governor Bill Haslam proposed to eliminate the full-time TRA board, replacing the four-member board with a board of five part-time members to be appointed by the governor and legislature, plus a full-time paid executive director. On May 1, 2012, both houses of the General Assembly gave final approval to a bill to implement Haslam's plan. A principal rationale for the change was cost savings, as proponents said the TRA workload was not sufficient to justify the salaries for a full-time board; annual savings were estimated at $300,000. Opposition to the proposal centered on concern that it would weaken regulation of public utilities. Sara Kyle, one of the directors, resigned in protest at the changes, saying that "The present administration changed it to part-time, with the commissioners only working one day a month. They need full-time service."

In 2017, Governor Haslam proposed and the General Assembly passed legislation renaming the TRA to the Tennessee Public Utility Commission, bringing it in line with national standards and counterparts in other states.

== Leadership ==
Current TPUC Commissioners
Commissioner	Appointer (years appointed)	Note
Robin Morrison	Speaker of the House Beth Harwell (2013, 2015)	Chairman
Kenneth Hill	Lt. Governor Ron Ramsey (2009, 2016)	Vice Chairman
David Jones	Joint appointee by Gov. Haslam, Lt. Gov. Ramsey, Speaker Harwell (2013)	
Herbert Hillard	Governor Bill Haslam (2012, 2017)	
John Hie		

The current Executive Director of the TPUC is Earl Taylor. He was appointed Executive Director by Speaker Harwell, Governor Haslam, and Lt. Governor Ron Ramsey in 2012 and reappointed by the Commission in 2018 to another three year term.

== See also ==
- Public Utilities Commission
