= Joey Hensley =

American politician (born 1955)

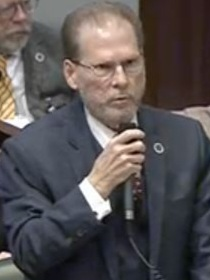
- Hensley in 2024

Member of the Tennessee Senate from the 28th district
- Incumbent
- Assumed office January 8, 2013
- Preceded by: Jim Kyle (redistricted)

Member of the Tennessee House of Representatives from the 70th district
- In office January 14, 2003 – January 8, 2013
- Preceded by: John White
- Succeeded by: Barry Doss

Personal details
- Born: July 28, 1955 (age 71) Hohenwald, Tennessee, U.S.
- Party: Republican
- Children: 3
- Education: Columbia State Community College (AS); University of Memphis (BS); University of Tennessee (MD)
- Website: Senate website

Joey Hensley (born July 28, 1955) is an American politician and a Republican member of the Tennessee Senate representing District 28 since January 8, 2013. Hensley served consecutively in the Tennessee General Assembly from January 2003 until January 8, 2013, in the Tennessee House of Representatives District 70 seat.

== Education ==
Hensley earned his AS from Columbia State Community College, his BS from the University of Memphis and his MD from the University of Tennessee.

== Tennessee legislature ==
In 2012 and 2013, Hensley introduced a bill, nicknamed "Don't Say Gay", to ban schools from discussing LGBT issues; the bill eventually failed.

For several years, Hensley cosponsored a bill allowing counselors and therapists "to refuse to counsel a client as to goals, outcomes, or behaviors that conflict with a sincerely held religious belief of the counselor or therapist," such as LGBT clients. This bill was eventually passed and signed into law on April 27, 2016.

In February 2017, Hensley introduced a bill that would classify children born through artificial insemination as illegitimate, even if both parents are married and consent to the insemination. He also sponsored a bill (known as the "Milo bill" after right-wing pundit Milo Yiannopoulos) requiring public universities "be open to any speaker whom students, student groups, or members of the faculty have invited."

In February 2020, Hensley argued against including female hygiene products such as tampons in a state sales-tax holiday because people could purchase too many if not given a limit. "I don't know how you would limit the number of items someone could purchase."

In 2021, after a historical commission voted to remove the bust of Confederate general and Ku Klux Klan member Nathan Bedford Forrest from the Tennessee state capitol, Hensley called for the firing of everyone on the historical commission.

In February 2022, Hensley introduced a bill, SB 2523, that would designate "a person who has been issued an enhanced handgun carry permit" as a member of law enforcement. A similar bill, HB 254, was introduced in the state house by Chris Hurt. A Hensley spokesperson said the bill would only allow someone to carry a gun where the police can. The Tennessee State Lodge for the Fraternal Order of Police said that it is "adamantly opposed" to the bill. Both bills were assigned to subcommittees which took no action, effectively defeating them.

== Elections ==
- 2002 To challenge House District 70 incumbent Democratic Representative John White, Hensley was unopposed for the August 1, 2002, Republican primary, winning with 2,996 votes; and won the November 5, 2002, general election with 8,791 votes (52.4%) against Democratic nominee Calvin Moore, who had defeated Representative White in the Democratic primary, and had run for Tennessee Senate in 2000.
- 2004 Hensley was unopposed for the August 5, 2004, Republican primary, winning with 2,100 votes, and won the three-way November 2, 2004, general election with 12,064 votes (55.2%) against Democratic nominee Johnny Lyles and Independent candidate Tharon Chandler.
- 2006 Hensley unopposed for the August 3, 2006, Republican primary, winning with 4,660 votes, and won the November 7, 2006, general election with 10,813 votes (62.9%) against Democratic nominee Timothy Dickey.
- 2008 Hensley was unopposed for the August 7, 2008, Republican primary, winning with 1,201 votes, and won the November 4, 2008, General election with 14,976 votes (75.4%) against Democratic nominee J. W. Hampton.
- 2010 Hensley and returning 2002 Democratic opponent Calvin Moore were both unopposed their August 5, 2010, primaries, setting up a rematch; Hensley won the November 2, 2010, general election with 10,026 votes (64.1%) against Moore.
- 2012 When Democratic Senator Jim Kyle was redistricted into a different seat, leaving the 28th district in the Senate open, Hensley ran in the August 2, 2012, Republican primary, winning with 12,589 votes (76.6%), and won the November 6, 2012, general election with 37,361 votes (55.2%) against Democratic nominee Ty Cobb.

== Personal life ==
Hensley is a member of the Sons of Confederate Veterans.

Hensley has been married four times and is divorced from his fourth wife, Gina. They have three children.

In 2015, Hensley introduced a bill to change the distribution of property in divorce cases, saying that he was prompted to do so by his own divorce proceedings. Shortly thereafter, Hensley's wife took out an order of protection against him for alleged abuse, but later asked to have it dismissed.

According to sworn family court testimony, Hensley carried on an affair with Lori Barber, a part-time nurse in his medical practice and his second cousin. Hensley also allegedly illegally prescribed opioids for Barber.
