= Tennessee's 30th Senate district =

American legislative district

Tennessee's 30th State Senate district
Senator
Sara Kyle; D–Memphis
- Demographics: 25% White; 60% Black; 9% Hispanic; 3% Asian; 1% Other; 2% Multiracial
- Population (2022): 196,973

Tennessee's 30th Senate district is one of 33 districts in the Tennessee Senate. It has been represented by Democrat Sara Kyle since 2015, succeeding her husband, fellow Democrat Jim Kyle.

== Geography ==
District 30 is based in Memphis, covering much of the city's Downtown, North, and East neighborhoods.

The district is located almost entirely within Tennessee's 9th congressional district, with a small section extending into the 8th district.

=== 2020 ===
2020 Tennessee Senate election, District 30
Primary election
Party	Candidate	Votes	%
Democratic	Sara Kyle (incumbent)	10,173	71.9
Democratic	M. LaTroy Williams	3,980	28.1
Total votes		14,153	100
General election
Democratic	Sara Kyle (incumbent)	43,895	100
Total votes		43,895	100
Democratic hold			

=== 2016 ===
2016 Tennessee Senate election, District 30
Primary election
Party	Candidate	Votes	%
Democratic	Sara Kyle (incumbent)	7,607	75.4
Democratic	Beverly Marrero	2,479	24.6
Total votes		10,086	100
General election
Democratic	Sara Kyle (incumbent)	39,668	100
Total votes		39,668	100
Democratic hold			

=== 2014 special ===
In 2014, Sara Kyle won a special election to succeed her husband, Jim Kyle, who ran for a judge position in Shelby County.

2014 Tennessee Senate special election, District 30
Party	Candidate	Votes	%
Democratic	Sara Kyle	18,377	69.9
Republican	George Shea Finn	7,044	26.8
Independent	David Vinciarelli	858	3.3
Total votes		26,279	100
Democratic hold			

=== 2012 ===
In 2012, redistricting pit 28th district incumbent Jim Kyle against 30th district incumbent Beverly Marrero, a contest Kyle won.

2012 Tennessee Senate election, District 30
Primary election
Party	Candidate	Votes	%
Democratic	Jim Kyle (incumbent)	7,368	55.4
Democratic	Beverly Marrero (incumbent)	5,931	44.6
Total votes		13,299	100
General election
Democratic	Jim Kyle (incumbent)	47,822	100
Total votes		47,822	100
Democratic hold			

=== Federal and statewide results ===
Year	Office	Results
2020	President	Biden 80.1 – 18.0%
2016	President	Clinton 80.0 – 17.3%
2012	President	Obama 81.5 – 17.8%
2012	Senate	Clayton 69.4 – 25.8%
