= Barry Doss =

American politician

Member of the Tennessee House of Representatives from the 70th district
- In office January 8, 2013 – January 8, 2019
- Preceded by: Joey Hensley
- Succeeded by: Clay Doggett

Personal details
- Party: Republican
- Education: University of Tennessee (BS)

Barry Doss from Leoma, Tennessee is an American politician and a former Republican member of the Tennessee House of Representatives representing District 70 from January 8, 2013 to January 8, 2019.

== Education ==
Doss earned his BS in animal science from University of Tennessee.

== Elections ==
- 2012 When District 70 Republican Representative Joey Hensley ran for Tennessee Senate and left the seat open, Doss ran in the three-way August 2, 2012 Republican Primary, winning with 4,294 votes (60.6%), and won the three-way November 6, 2012 General election with 11,496 votes (51.1%) against Democratic nominee Calvin Moore (who had run for the seat in 2010) and Independent candidate John Johnson.
- Barry Doss lost to primary challenger Clay Doggett, 48%(4,924) to 52%(5,277) on August 2, 2018.
