= Tennessee's 28th Senate district =

American legislative district

Tennessee's 28th State Senate district
Senator
Joey Hensley; R–Hohenwald
- Demographics: 82% White; 8% Black; 6% Hispanic; 1% Asian; 3% Multiracial
- Population (2022): 211,583

For the 28th district in the Tennessee House of Representatives, see Tennessee House of Representatives 28th district

Tennessee's 28th Senate district is one of 33 districts in the Tennessee Senate. It has been represented by Republican Joey Hensley since 2012.

== Geography ==
District 28 covers a rural swath of southern Middle Tennessee, including all of Giles, Lewis, Marshall, and Maury Counties, and includes part of Williamson County. Communities in the district include Columbia, Pulaski, Mount Pleasant, Hohenwald, and most of Spring Hill.

The district overlaps with Tennessee's 4th and 5th congressional districts. It borders the state of Alabama.

== Recent election results ==
Tennessee Senators are elected to staggered four-year terms, with odd-numbered districts holding elections in midterm years and even-numbered districts holding elections in presidential years.

=== 2020 ===
2020 Tennessee Senate election, District 28
Party	Candidate	Votes	%
Republican	Joey Hensley (incumbent)	65,050	78.4
Independent	James Gray	17,872	21.6
Total votes		82,925	100
Republican hold			

=== 2016 ===
2016 Tennessee Senate election, District 28
Primary election
Party	Candidate	Votes	%
Republican	Joey Hensley (incumbent)	51,251	74.6
Independent	Joey Norman	17,460	25.4
Total votes		68,711	100
Republican hold			

=== 2012 ===
2012 Tennessee Senate election, District 28
Primary election
Party	Candidate	Votes	%
Republican	Joey Hensley	12,589	76.6
Republican	Dean Dickey	3,847	23.4
Total votes		16,436	100
General election
Republican	Joey Hensley	37,361	55.2
Democratic	Tyler Cobb	30,375	44.8
Total votes		67,736	100
Republican gain from new constituency			

=== Federal and statewide results ===
Year	Office	Results
2020	President	Trump 73.8 – 24.8%
2016	President	Trump 73.1 – 23.9%
2012	President	Romney 65.9 – 32.6%
2012	Senate	Corker 67.1 – 28.3%
