= Sara Kyle =

American politician (born 1952)

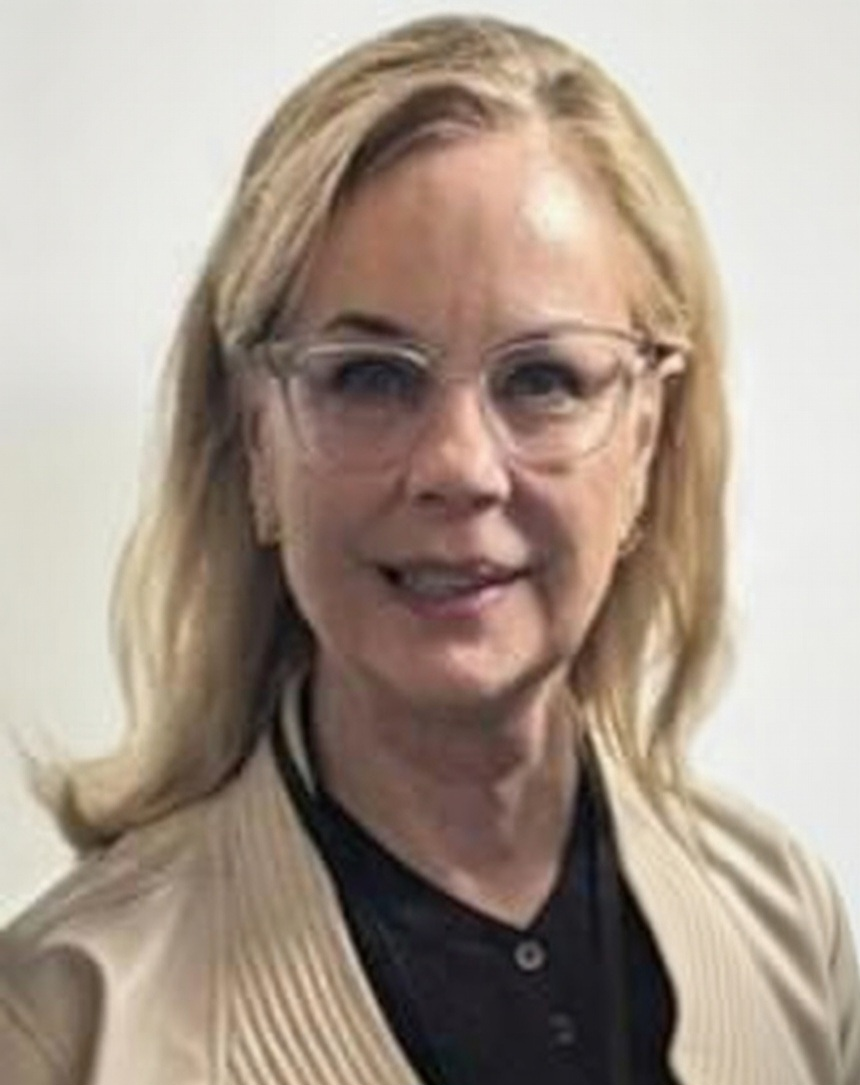
- Kyle in 2024

Member of the Tennessee Senate from the 30th district
- Incumbent
- Assumed office January 13, 2015
- Preceded by: Jim Kyle

Director of the Tennessee Regulatory Authority
- In office July 1, 1996 – March 13, 2013
- Preceded by: None (position established)
- Succeeded by: Robin Morrison

Personal details
- Born: Sara Peery; October 21, 1952 (age 74) Dickson, Tennessee, U.S.
- Party: Democratic
- Spouse: Jim Kyle
- Children: 4
- Education: Nashville School of Law
- Profession: Attorney

Sara Peery Kyle (born October 21, 1952) is an American attorney and politician. A member of the Democratic Party, she currently represents the 30th district in the Tennessee Senate. She became the second woman elected to statewide office in Tennessee when she won the race for Public Service Commissioner in 1994. Kyle has been a member of the Senate since the 109th Tennessee General Assembly.

== Life ==
Kyle was born in 1952 to Bruce and Emma Gene Clement Peery of Dickson, Tennessee and was a 1970 graduate of Dickson High School. She is the niece of former Tennessee governor Frank G. Clement and former Tennessee state senator Anna Belle Clement O'Brien. She is married to Jim Kyle.

== Career ==
Kyle was elected to the Public Service Commission in 1994. The PSC as an elected position was eliminated and replaced by the appointed Tennessee Regulatory Authority to which Kyle was appointed in 1996 by then Democratic Speaker Jimmy Naifeh. Kyle was reappointed to successive terms by Tennessee political leaders serving in appointed capacity from 1996 until March 2013 when she resigned, in protest, saying changes made by the Republican Governor Bill Haslam left the agency ineffective. Kyle briefly considered another effort at a statewide race in 2014 against Governor Haslam, but decided against this course of action.

In 2014 she was elected for an interim 2-year period of the remaining term to represent 30th district in the Tennessee Senate, which is composed of part of Memphis, after her husband retired from the seat mid-term. She won re-election to the state senate in 2016, running unopposed in the general election.

On 4 April 2016, Kyle voted for HB0615, a bill that would designate the Bible as the official state book. The bill, supported by a majority of the state's Republican senators and one other Democratic senator, was vetoed by Gov. Bill Haslam. On 2 February 2019, Kyle proposed bill SB1320 on Arrests and bill SB1317 on Child Custody and Support and they were both passed.
