= Tennessee's 12th Senate district =

American legislative district

Tennessee's 12th State Senate district
Senator
| Ken Yager; R–Kingston |
- Demographics: 93% White; 1% Black; 2% Hispanic; 2% Multiracial
- Population (2022): 215,432

Tennessee's 12th Senate district is one of 33 districts in the Tennessee Senate. It has been represented by Republican Ken Yager since 2008.

== Geography ==
District 12 covers Campbell, Clay, Fentress, Macon, Morgan, Overton, Pickett, Roane, and Scott Counties in rural East Tennessee. Communities in the district include Dayton, LaFollette, Harriman, Kingston, Rockwood, Oneida, Coalfield, Jamestown, Byrdstown, and part of Oak Ridge.

The district is located within Tennessee's 2nd, 3rd, and 6th congressional districts. It borders the state of Kentucky.

== Recent election results ==
Tennessee Senators are elected to staggered four-year terms, with odd-numbered districts holding elections in midterm years and even-numbered districts holding elections in presidential years.

=== 2020 ===
2020 Tennessee Senate election, District 12
| Party | Candidate | Votes | % |
|---|---|---|---|
| Republican | Ken Yager (incumbent) | 69,042 | 100 |
| Total votes | | 69,042 | 100 |
| Republican hold | | | |

=== 2016 ===
2016 Tennessee Senate election, District 12
| Party | Candidate | Votes | % |
|---|---|---|---|
| Republican | Ken Yager (incumbent) | 55,219 | 100 |
| Total votes | | 55,219 | 100 |
| Republican hold | | | |

=== 2012 ===
2012 Tennessee Senate election, District 12
| Party | Candidate | Votes | % |
|---|---|---|---|
| Republican | Ken Yager (incumbent) | 51,076 | 100 |
| Total votes | | 51,076 | 100 |
| Republican hold | | | |

=== Federal and statewide results ===
| Year | Office | Results |
|---|---|---|
| 2020 | President | Trump 80.7 – 17.6% |
| 2016 | President | Trump 78.4 – 18.4% |
| 2012 | President | Romney 72.2 – 26.3% |
| 2012 | Senate | Corker 76.5 – 19.6% |
