= U.S. Advisory Commission on Intergovernmental Relations =

The U.S. Advisory Commission on Intergovernmental Relations (ACIR) was an independent, bipartisan agency in the United States federal government formed to study and consider the federal government's intergovernmental relationships. It was established in 1959 by under Public Law 86-380 and operated until 1996.

ACIR was a successor to the Commission on Intergovernmental Relations, popularly known as the Kestenbaum Commission, a temporary commission that operated from 1953 to 1955.

ACIR was directed by a 26-member commission that consisted of six members of the U.S. Congress appointed by the leadership of the House and Senate, four state governors, three members of state legislatures, four mayors, three county officials, three private citizens and three representatives of the executive branch of the federal government. The citizen and executive branch representatives were appointed directly by the President. The state, county, and municipal officials were appointed by the President from nominations submitted by national organizations of state and local governments. ACIR had a professional staff of between 15 and 30 people who conducted research for the organization.

It was terminated by the 1996 budget by a Republican-dominated Congress and with support of president Bill Clinton, who became displeased with ACIR's handling of unfunded federal mandates.
