= Tennessee General Assembly =

Legislative branch of the state government of Tennessee

- 114th Tennessee General Assembly

Type
- Type: Bicameral
- Houses: Senate; House of Representatives
- Term limits: None

History
- Founded: June 1, 1796; 229 years ago
- New session started: January 14, 2025

Leadership
- Senate Speaker: Randy McNally (R) since January 9, 2017
- House Speaker: Cameron Sexton (R) since August 23, 2019

Structure
- Seats: 132 voting members: 33 Senators; 99 Representatives
- Senate political groups: Republican (27); Democratic (6)
- House political groups: Republican (75); Democratic (24)
- Length of term: Senate: 4 years House: 2 years
- Salary: $33,060/year + per diem, employee benefits, travel reimbursement

Elections
- Senate voting system: First-past-the-post
- House voting system: First-past-the-post
- Last Senate election: November 5, 2024
- Last House election: November 5, 2024
- Next Senate election: November 3, 2026
- Next House election: November 3, 2026
- Redistricting: Legislative Control

Meeting place
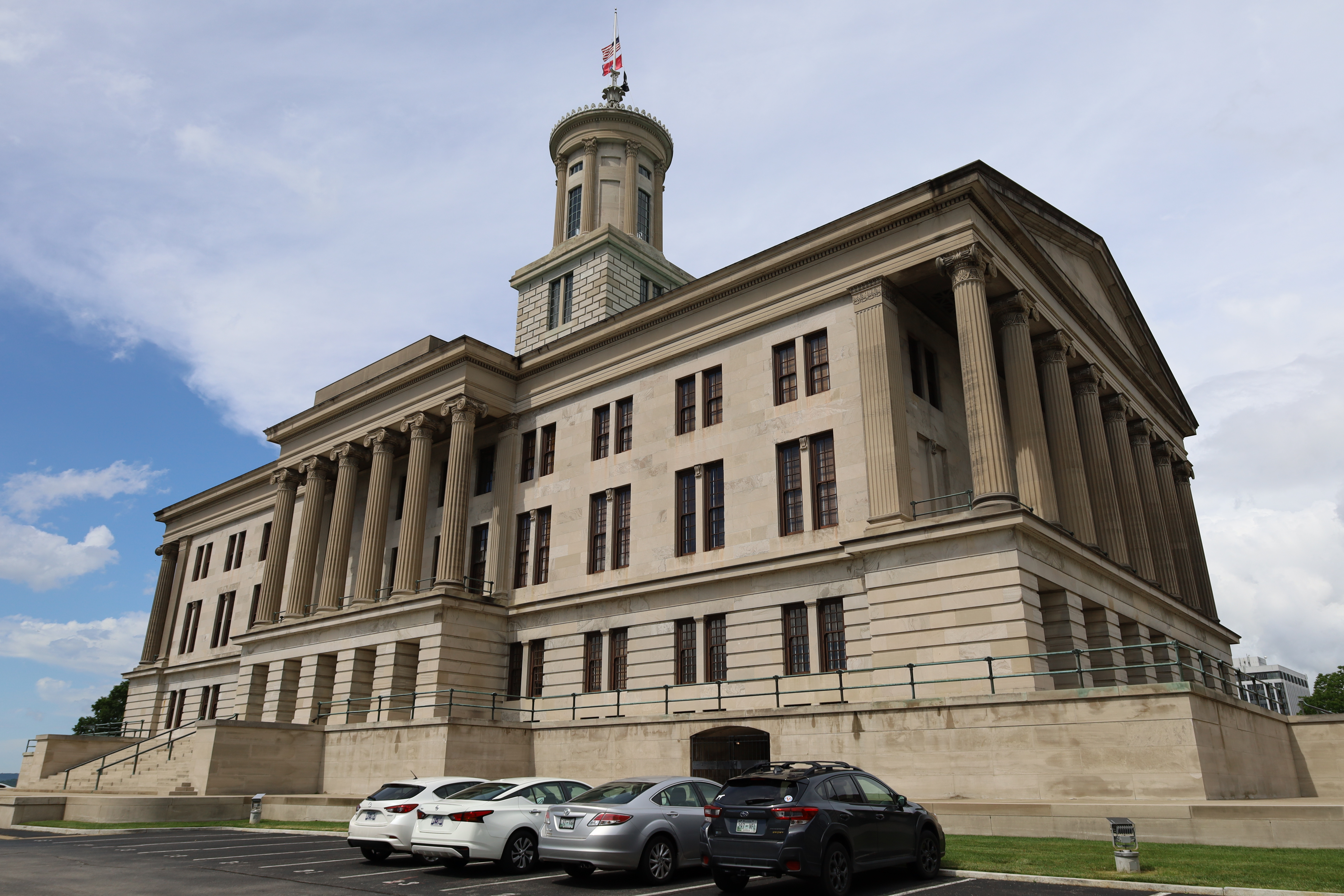
- Tennessee State Capitol; Nashville

Website
- Tennessee General Assembly

Constitution
- Constitution of Tennessee

The Tennessee General Assembly (TNGA) is the state legislature of the U.S. state of Tennessee. It is a part-time bicameral legislature consisting of a Senate and a House of Representatives. The Speaker of the Senate carries the additional title and office of Lieutenant Governor of Tennessee. In addition to passing a budget for state government plus other legislation, the General Assembly appoints three state officers specified by the state constitution. It is also the initiating body in any process to amend the state's constitution.

== Organization ==
=== Constitutional structure ===
According to the Tennessee State Constitution of 1870, the General Assembly is a bicameral legislature and consists of a Senate of thirty-three members and a House of Representatives of ninety-nine members.

The representatives are elected to two-year terms; according to a 1966 constitutional amendment the senators are elected to four-year terms which are staggered, with the districts with even numbers being elected in the year of Presidential elections and those in the districts with odd numbers being elected in the years of Tennessee gubernatorial elections.

According to the Tennessee Constitution each representative must be twenty-one years old, a citizen of the United States, have been a resident of the state for three years and also a resident of the county they represent a year prior to the election. The state constitution also states that each senator must be thirty years of age, a citizen of the United States, resided three years in Tennessee, and resided in the district one year prior to the election.

=== Part-time legislature ===
To keep the legislature a part-time body, it is limited to ninety "legislative days" per two-year term, plus up to fifteen days for organizational purposes at the start of each term. A legislative day is considered any day that the House or Senate formally meets in the chambers of each house. Legislators are paid a base salary of $24,316 along with a per diem expense of $284 per legislative day (2020). If the legislature remains in session longer than ninety legislative days, lawmakers cease to draw their expense money.

Legislators also receive an "office allowance" of $1,000 per month, ostensibly for the maintenance of an office area devoted to their legislative work in their homes or elsewhere within their district. Traditionally, it has been easier, politically speaking, to raise the per diem and office allowance than the salary.

The speaker of each house is entitled to a salary triple that of other members. Under a law enacted in 2004, legislators will receive a raise equal to that given to state employees the previous year, if any.

The governor may also call "extraordinary sessions", limited to the topic or topics outlined in the call, and limited to another twenty days. Two-thirds of each house may also initiate such a call by petitioning for it.

=== Joint committees ===
Each chamber sets up its own committee system; however, there are a number of committees which are composed of members of both the House and Senate.

Joint Fiscal Review Committee

The Joint Fiscal Review Committee continuously reviews items such as revenue collections, the proposed budget and other budget requests, appropriations, state debt, and various state funds, among other items. It also prepares estimates of revenues from the Tennessee Education Lottery and oversees the financial operations of state departments and agencies. Further, it prepares the fiscal note attached to each bill presented in the General Assembly, describing the estimated cost of the bill's contents on state and local government.

It was set up as a special continuing committee of the General Assembly in 1967 and is composed of six senators and nine representatives, each elected by their respective chambers. Additionally, ex officio members include the Speaker of each house and each house's chairman of the Finance, Ways, and Means committee. The current members are as follows:

Members of the Joint Fiscal Review Committee
Name	Chamber	Note
Ron Travis (R)	House	Chair
Todd Gardenhire (R)	Senate	Vice-chair
Paul Bailey (R)	Senate	
Brenda Gilmore (D)	Senate	
Sara Kyle (D)	Senate	
Steve Southerland (R)	Senate	
Bo Watson (R)	Senate	ex officio as chair of Senate Finance, Ways, and Means Committee
Ken Yager (R)	Senate	
Bill Beck (D)	House	
Michael Curcio (R)	House	
Martin Daniel (R)	House	
Darren Jernigan (D)	House	
Susan Lynn (R)	House	ex officio as chair of Senate Finance, Ways, and Means Committee
Pat Marsh (R)	House	
Larry J. Miller (D)	House	
Mark White (R)	House	
Ryan Williams (R)	House	

Joint Government Operations Rule Review Committee

The Joint Government Operations Rule Review Committee is composed of all members of the House and Senate Government Operations Committees. It reviews rules and regulations created by state departments and agencies.

It has three subcommittees.

Joint Government Operations Rule Review subcommittees
Subcommittee	Chair	Vice-chair	Members
Commerce, Labor, Transportation, and Agriculture	Rep. Jay Reedy (R)	Sen. Paul Rose (R)	Senators: Mike Bell, Rusty Crowe, Ed Jackson, Sara Kyle, Mark Pody
Commerce, Labor, Transportation, and Agriculture	Rep. Jay Reedy (R)	Sen. Paul Rose (R)	Representatives: Martin Daniel, Curtis Halford, G.A. Hardaway, Dan Howell, William Lamberth, John Ragan
Education, Health, and General Welfare	Rep. John Ragan (R)	Sen. Janice Bowling (R)	Senators: Rusty Crowe, Ed Jackson, Bill Powers, Kerry Roberts, Sara Kyle, Paul Rose
Education, Health, and General Welfare	Rep. John Ragan (R)	Sen. Janice Bowling (R)	Representatives: Kent Calfee, Karen Camper, Martin Daniel, Gloria Johnson, William Lamberth, Iris Rudder
Judiciary and Government	Sen. Mark Pody (R)	Rep. Justin Lafferty (R)	Senators: Mike Bell, Janice Bowling, Sara Kyle, Bill Powers, Kerry Roberts
Judiciary and Government	Sen. Mark Pody (R)	Rep. Justin Lafferty (R)	Representatives: Kent Calfee, Martin Daniel, Bill Dunn, William Lamberth, Mary Littleton, Mike Stewart

Joint Committee on Pensions and Insurance

It is composed of the officers of the House and Senate Finance, Ways, and Means committees, three members appointed by each finance committee chair, and two members appointed by each speaker. Furthermore, the Comptroller of the Treasury, state treasurer, and commissioners of Human Resources and Finance and Administration, as well as the director of the state retirement system, are included on an ex-officio basis.

Members of the Joint Pensions and Insurance Committee
Member	Office
Sen. Bo Watson (R)	Chair and chair of Senate FYM Committee
Rep. Susan Lynn (R)	Vice-chair and chair of House FYM Committee
Sen. Paul Bailey (R)	
Sen. Todd Gardenhire (R)	
Sen. Brenda Gilmore (D)	
Sen. Joey Hensley (R)	2nd Vice Chair of Senate FYM Committee
Sen. Jack Johnson (R)	
Sen. John Stevens (R)	1st Vice Chair of Senate FYM Committee
Rep. Patsy Hazelwood (R)	Vice-Chair of House FYM Committee
Rep. Gary Hicks (R)	
Rep. Andy Holt (R)	
Rep. William Lamberth (R)	
Rep. Brandon Ogles (R)	
Rep. Rick Staples (D)	
Ex officio members
Jason Mumpower	Comptroller of the Treasury
David Lillard	State Treasurer
Juan Williams	Commissioner of Human Resources
Stuart McWhorter	Commissioner of Finance and Administration
Jamie Wayman	Director of Tennessee Consolidated Retirement System

TACIR

The Tennessee Advisory Commission on Intergovernmental Relations is considered to be a joint committee of the legislature.

== Composition of the 113th General Assembly (2023–2024) ==
=== Senate ===
Affiliation	Party (Shading indicates majority caucus)		Total	
Affiliation	Republican	Democratic	Total	Vacant
End of previous legislature	27	6	33	0
Beginning of 113th GA	27	6	33	0

=== House ===
Affiliation	Party (Shading indicates majority caucus)		Total	
Affiliation	Republican	Democratic	Total	Vacant
End of previous legislature	73	25	99	0
Beginning of 113th General Assembly	75	24	99	0
April 6, 2023	75	22	97	2
April 10, 2023	75	23	98	1
April 12, 2023	75	24	99	0
April 20, 2023	74	24	98	1

See Tennessee Senate and Tennessee House of Representatives for current member lists and further information.

== Work of the General Assembly ==
=== Legislative schedule ===
Legislative days are scheduled no more than three days a week during the session. Legislative sessions in both the House and Senate occur on Mondays, Wednesdays, and Thursdays. Tuesdays and the majority of Wednesdays are used primarily for committee meetings and hearings rather than actual sessions. Tuesdays and Wednesdays in the Tennessee Capitol also take on an eclectic flavor most weeks, as varied and diverse constituent groups set up display booths to inform lawmakers about their respective causes.

Sessions begin each year in January and usually end by May; during recent fiscal crises meetings have spilled over into July. The time limit on reimbursed working days and the fact that the Tennessee state government fiscal year is on a July 1 – June 30 basis puts considerable time pressure on the General Assembly, especially with regard to the adoption of a budget.

Membership in the legislature is best regarded as being a full-time job during the session and a part-time job the rest of the year due to committee meetings and hearings (for which legislators are reimbursed their expenses and receive a mileage allowance). A few members are on enough committees to make something of a living from being legislators; most are independent businesspeople and attorneys, although the latter group is perhaps no longer the absolute majority of members that it at one time comprised. In keeping with Tennessee's agricultural roots, some senators and representatives are farmers.

Lobbyists are not allowed to share meals with legislators on an individual basis, but they are not forbidden from inviting the entire legislature or selected groups to events honoring them, which has become a primary means of lobbying. Members are also forbidden from holding campaign fundraising events for themselves during the time they are actually in session.

=== Leadership ===
Each house sets its own rules and elects its own speaker; the Speaker of the Senate carries the additional title and office of Lieutenant Governor of Tennessee. For over three decades, both speakers were from West Tennessee; this caused considerable resentment in the eastern two-thirds of the state. From 1971 until January 2007, Tennessee had the same lieutenant governor, John S. Wilder, a Democrat. Wilder was re-elected to the position even after Tennessee Republicans re-took the state senate in the 2004 election. However, in January 2007, after Republicans gained additional seats in the 2006 General Assembly elections, the Senate elected Republican Ron Ramsey (from East Tennessee) to the office of lieutenant governor. The current lieutenant governor is Republican Randy McNally, who was elected in January 2017. The 111th General Assembly of Tennessee has 32 new legislators, with 28 of those legislators in the House. The 111th General Assembly also had a new Speaker of the House and majority leader in the Senate, respectively, and new lawmakers in leadership positions. The current speaker of the House is Cameron Sexton, who was elected in 2019.

=== Layout of districts ===
The General Assembly districts of both houses are supposed to be reapportioned based on population as determined by the U.S. federal census on a decennial basis. This was not done between 1902 and 1962, resulting in the United States Supreme Court decision in Baker v. Carr (369 U.S. 186), which required this action to be taken. Afterwards, there were other lawsuits, including one which resulted in an order for the body to create a black-majority district in West Tennessee for the House in the late 1990s.

== Powers ==
=== Legislation ===
Tennessee legislators' objectives are to enact, amend, and repeal Tennessee Laws. Powers specific to Tennessee legislators include appropriation of money, the levy and collection of taxes, and the right to authorize counties and towns to tax. The General Assembly is recognized by the state constitution as the supreme legislative authority of the state. It is the General Assembly's responsibility to pass a budget for the functioning of the state government. Each year, the governor outlines their budget priorities in the State of the State address. The Assembly, in a joint session, is present for the speech. Bills may originate in either the House or Senate, and can be either a general or local bill. A general bill affects the state, while a local bill affects a town or county. A local bill must be passed in the state legislature and ratified by the local area it affects. The Tennessee Constitution states that after a bill has been rejected by the General Assembly, no bill with the same substance can be passed into law during the same session. The Tennessee Constitution states that each bill must be passed on three separate days in both houses. In order for a new bill to pass it requires a constitutional majority.

=== Appointments ===
According to the state constitution, three positions in state government collectively referred to as the "Constitutional Officers" — the secretary of state, state treasurer, and the Comptroller of the Treasury — are selected by the General Assembly in joint session, where each member of the General Assembly is afforded a single vote. Each office is awarded to the first candidate to receive a majority of the votes (67 of 132).

The General Assembly selects the seven members of the State Election Commission. It selects four members from the majority party (the one controlling the majority of the 132 total seats) and three members from the minority party.

=== Gubernatorial election dispute ===
A contested gubernatorial election is supposed to be decided by a joint session of the General Assembly, according to statutory law. The General Assembly is also required to decide the result of the gubernatorial election by joint session according to the state constitution in the event of an exact tie in the popular vote, an extremely unlikely election result.

=== Amending the State Constitution ===
The General Assembly can propose amendments to the state constitution, but only through one of the two available time-consuming processes:

==== Legislative initiative ====
For the legislature to propose amendments to the state constitution directly, an amendment must first be passed by an absolute majority of the membership of each house during one term of the Assembly. Then, during the next General Assembly term, each house must pass the amendment again, this time by a two-thirds majority.

The amendment must then be put on the statewide ballot, but only at a time when an election for governor is also being held. The amendment to be passed must receive over half of the total votes cast in the gubernatorial election in order to be ratified and come into effect.

The 1870 constitution of Tennessee had never been amended in this manner until 1998, when the "Victims' Rights Amendment" was added. A similar process was used in 2002 to enact the state lottery.

Two amendments proposed by the General Assembly were presented to voters on the 2006 ballot. In 2005 the "Tennessee Marriage Protection Amendment," specifying that only marriages between a man and a woman could be legally recognized in the state, was approved for submission to the voters in 2006. The ACLU had previously challenged the validity of the amendment by asserting that a constitutional obligation to publicly advertise the amendment had not been satisfied. However, on February 23, 2006, Davidson County Chancellor Ellen Hobbs Lyle ruled that the proposed amendment would be on the ballot in 2006. Both that amendment and an amendment authorizing exemption of senior citizens from property tax increases were approved by voters in November 2006.

In 2010, voters approved an amendment providing a right to hunt and fish within state regulations.

==== Constitutional convention ====
The other method of amending the state constitution, and the one used for all amendments prior to 1998, is for the General Assembly to put on the ballot the question of whether a limited constitutional convention should be called for the purpose of considering amendments to certain specified provisions of the constitution.

If the voters approve this in a statewide election, they then, at the next statewide election, elect delegates to this convention. This body then meets (in the House chamber of the Tennessee State Capitol) and makes its recommendations. These recommendations can be voted on in any election, either one specially called or in conjunction with other statewide elections, and need only pass by a simple majority of those casting votes.

This method cannot be employed more often than once every six years.

== See also ==
- Baker v. Carr
- Tennessee State Capitol
- Government of Tennessee
- List of Tennessee General Assemblies
- Political party strength in Tennessee
- State legislature (United States)
