= Jim Tracy (politician) =

American politician from Tennessee (1956–2026)

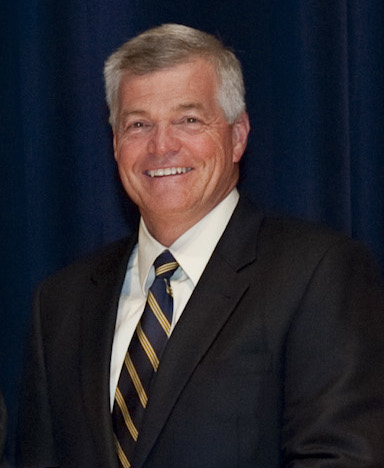
- Tracy in 2012

Tennessee State Director of USDA Rural Development
- In office November 13, 2017 – January 2021
- President: Donald Trump; Joe Biden
- Preceded by: Harriet Cannon

President pro tempore of the Tennessee Senate
- In office January 10, 2017 – November 6, 2017
- Preceded by: Bo Watson
- Succeeded by: Ferrell Haile

Member of the Tennessee Senate from the 14th district
- In office January 2013 – November 6, 2017
- Preceded by: Eric Stewart
- Succeeded by: Shane Reeves

Member of the Tennessee Senate from the 16th district
- In office January 2005 – January 2013
- Preceded by: Larry Trail
- Succeeded by: Janice Bowling

Personal details
- Born: October 9, 1956 Jackson, Tennessee, U.S.
- Died: July 3, 2026 (aged 69) Murfreesboro, Tennessee, U.S.
- Party: Republican
- Education: University of Tennessee (BS)

James Dolan Tracy (October 9, 1956 – July 3, 2026) was an American politician and the Tennessee Director for Rural Development for the first Trump Administration. He was also a member of the Tennessee Senate for the 14th district, which is composed of Bedford County, Moore County, and part of Rutherford County.

== Tennessee Senate ==
Among legislation Tracy sponsored was a bill that would ban smoking in indoor public places, places owned or operated by the state, and enclosed areas of employment. The bill passed the State and Local Government Committee with five senators in favor and two against. It passed in May 2007 and took effect on October 1, 2007.

Tracy was the Assistant Floor Leader of the Senate Republican Caucus, the Chair of the Senate Transportation Committee, and a member of the Senate Education Committee and the Senate State and Local Government Committee.

Before his election to the Senate, Tracy graduated from the University of Tennessee at Martin with a Bachelor of Science degree and worked as an insurance agent.

== Congressional campaigns ==
=== 2010 U.S. Congressional campaign ===
In December 2009, after incumbent U.S. Representative Bart Gordon decided to retire, Tracy announced that he would run in the Republican primaries for the state's 6th Congressional district. It was one of the few districts in which John McCain's margin of victory (25 percentage points) in the 2008 presidential election was larger than George W. Bush's in 2004 (20 points). Among the possible candidates mentioned by insiders were state Representatives Henry Fincher and Mike McDonald, both Democrats who declined to run. Tracy's biggest competition in the Republican primary came from state Senator Diane Black and former Rutherford County GOP chairwoman Lou Ann Zelenik. Newt Gingrich endorsed Tracy. He finished third in the primary.

=== 2014 U.S. Congressional campaign ===
Tracy announced that he would challenge Representative Scott DesJarlais of Tennessee's 4th congressional district in the 2014 Republican primary. By the end of June 2013, he had raised nearly $750,000. DesJarlais won the Republican primary by a mere 38 votes before going on to win the general election handily.

== USDA Rural Development ==
In 2017, Tracy was appointed Tennessee state director of USDA Rural Development.

== Personal life and death ==
Tracy was born on October 9, 1956, in Jackson, Tennessee. He died of cancer in Murfreesboro, Tennessee, on July 3, 2026, at the age of 69.
