= Tennessee's 18th Senate district =

American legislative district

Tennessee's 18th State Senate district
Senator
Ferrell Haile; R–Gallatin
- Demographics: 81% White; 8% Black; 6% Hispanic; 1% Asian; 3% Multiracial
- Population (2022): 208,441

Tennessee's 18th Senate district is one of 33 districts in the Tennessee Senate. It has been represented by Republican Ferrell Haile, the current Senate president pro tempore, since 2012.

== Geography ==
District 18 is based in Sumner County in the northern suburbs of Nashville, also covering Trousdale County. Communities in the district include Hendersonville, Gallatin, Hartsville, Portland, and some of Goodsville, White House, and Millersville.

The district is located completely within Tennessee's 6th congressional district. It borders the state of Kentucky.

== Recent election results ==
Tennessee senators are elected to staggered four-year terms, with odd-numbered districts conducting elections in midterm years and even-numbered districts conducting elections in years of presidential elections.

=== 2020 ===
2020 Tennessee Senate election, District 18
Party	Candidate	Votes	%
Republican	Ferrell Haile (incumbent)	68,141	72.2
Independent	John Gentry	26,261	27.8
Total votes		94,402	100
Republican hold			

=== 2016 ===
2016 Tennessee Senate election, District 18
Party	Candidate	Votes	%
Republican	Ferrell Haile (incumbent)	64,220	100
Total votes		64,220	100
Republican hold			

=== 2012 ===
2012 Tennessee Senate election, District 18
Primary election
Party	Candidate	Votes	%
Republican	Ferrell Haile	8,627	48.2
Republican	Jeff Coker	7,527	42.1
Republican	J. H. Tony Allers	1,370	7.7
Republican	Brock Ewell	367	2.1
Total votes		17,891	100
General election
Republican	Ferrell Haile	49,472	69.2
Democratic	Maria Brewer	21,970	30.8
Total votes		71,442	100
Republican hold			

=== Federal and statewide results ===
Year	Office	Results
2020	President	Trump 66.1 – 32%
2016	President	Trump 67.7 – 28.2%
2012	President	Romney 67.9 – 30.8%
2012	Senate	Corker 72.9 – 22.7%
