= Tennessee's 14th Senate district =

American legislative district

Tennessee's 14th State Senate district
Senator
Shane Reeves; R–Murfreesboro
- Demographics: 68% White; 14% Black; 12% Hispanic; 1% Asian; 3% Other
- Population (2022): 211,096

Tennessee's 14th Senate district is one of 33 districts in the Tennessee Senate. It has been represented by Republican Shane Reeves since a 2018 special election to replace fellow Republican Jim Tracy.

== Geography ==
District 14 stretches from eastern Murfreesboro to Lynchburg in Middle Tennessee, covering part of Rutherford County and all of Bedford, Cannon, and Moore Counties. Other communities in the district include Shelbyville and Woodbury.

The district is located mainly within Tennessee's 4th congressional district but also is within the 5th congressional district.

== Recent election results ==
Tennessee Senators are elected to staggered four-year terms, with odd-numbered districts holding elections in midterm years and even-numbered districts holding elections in presidential years.

=== 2020 ===
2020 Tennessee Senate election, District 14
Party	Candidate	Votes	%
Republican	Shane Reeves (incumbent)	62,351	71.8
Democratic	Chase Clemons	24,440	28.2
Total votes		86,791	100
Republican hold			

=== 2018 special ===
In March 2018, a special election was held to replace Republican Jim Tracy, who resigned in 2017 to become Tennessee State Director of USDA Rural Development.

2018 Tennessee Senate special election, District 14
Primary election
Party	Candidate	Votes	%
Republican	Shane Reeves	2,094	64.5
Republican	Joe Carr	1,150	35.5
Total votes		3,244	100
General election
Republican	Shane Reeves	13,139	71.7
Democratic	Gayle Jordan	5,179	28.3
Total votes		18,318	100
Republican hold			

=== 2016 ===
2016 Tennessee Senate election, District 14
Primary election
Party	Candidate	Votes	%
Republican	Jim Tracy (incumbent)	10,817	81.6
Republican	Steve Lane	1,681	12.7
Republican	Matt Randolph	754	5.7
Total votes		13,252	100
General election
Republican	Jim Tracy (incumbent)	53,082	74.4
Democratic	Gayle Jordan	18,259	25.6
Total votes		71,341	100
Republican hold			

=== 2012 ===
2012 Tennessee Senate election, District 14
Primary election
Party	Candidate	Votes	%
Republican	Jim Tracy (incumbent)	11,174	86.7
Republican	Matt Randolph	1,707	13.3
Total votes		12,881	100
General election
Republican	Jim Tracy (incumbent)	50,235	100
Total votes		50,235	100
Republican hold			

=== Federal and statewide results ===
Year	Office	Results
2020	President	Trump 68.6 – 29.3%
2016	President	Trump 69.8 – 26.3%
2012	President	Romney 66.9 – 31.7%
2012	Senate	Corker 69.8 – 25.8%
