= Tennessee's 16th Senate district =

American legislative district

Tennessee's 16th State Senate district
Senator
Janice Bowling; R–Tullahoma
- Demographics: 87% White; 4% Black; 6% Hispanic; 1% Asian; 3% Multiracial
- Population (2022): 211,347

Tennessee's 16th Senate district is one of 33 districts in the Tennessee Senate. It has been represented by Republican Janice Bowling since 2012, succeeding Democrat Eric Stewart.

== Geography ==
District 16 is based in the rural areas to the west of Chattanooga, covering all of Coffee, DeKalb, Franklin, Grundy, Lincoln, and Warren Counties. Communities in the district include Tullahoma, Manchester, McMinnville, Winchester, and Gruetli-Laager.

The district overlaps with Tennessee's 4th and 6th congressional districts. It borders the state of Alabama.

== Recent election results ==
Tennessee senators are elected to staggered four-year terms, with odd-numbered districts conducting elections in midterm years and even-numbered districts conducting elections in years of presidential elections.

=== 2020 ===
2020 Tennessee Senate election, District 16
Party	Candidate	Votes	%
Republican	Janice Bowling (incumbent)	62,379	76.0
Democratic	Sheila Younglove	19,687	24.0
Total votes		82,066	100
Republican hold			

=== 2016 ===
2016 Tennessee Senate election, District 16
Primary election
Party	Candidate	Votes	%
Republican	Janice Bowling (incumbent)	10,235	81.7
Republican	Michael Shane Wilcher	2,287	18.3
Total votes		12,522	100
Democratic	Mike Winton	3,342	70.3
Democratic	Alice Demetreon	1,414	29.7
Total votes		4,756	100
General election
Republican	Janice Bowling (incumbent)	46,846	67.8
Democratic	Mike Winton	22,205	32.2
Total votes		69,051	100
Republican hold			

=== 2012 ===
2012 Tennessee Senate election, District 16
Primary election
Party	Candidate	Votes	%
Democratic	Jim Lewis	2,937	27.6
Democratic	Steve Roller	2,902	27.3
Democratic	Justin Walling	2,878	27.0
Democratic	Kevin Lawrence	1,256	11.8
Democratic	Jeff Bottoms	670	6.3
Total votes		10,643	100
Republican	Janice Bowling	8,162	60.1
Republican	Ron Stolzfus	2,280	16.8
Republican	Eric Chance	2,277	16.8
Republican	Rod McClellan	866	6.4
Total votes		13,585	100
General election
Republican	Janice Bowling	40,139	62.9
Democratic	Jim Lewis	23,636	37.1
Total votes		63,775	100
Republican gain from Democratic			

=== Federal and statewide results ===
Year	Office	Results
2020	President	Trump 75.1 – 23.1%
2016	President	Trump 72.2 – 24.6%
2012	President	Romney 63.9 – 34.3%
2012	Senate	Corker 69.2 – 26.8%
