= America's Climate Security Act of 2007 =

The America's Climate Security Act of 2007 was a global warming bill that was considered by the United States Senate to reduce the amount of greenhouse gases emitted in the United States. Also known as the Lieberman–Warner bill, bill number S. 2191, the legislation was introduced by Sens. Joseph Lieberman (I-CT) and John Warner (R-VA) on October 18, 2007. The bill was approved by the Senate Committee on Environment and Public Works in December 2007, and was debated in the Senate during the week of June 2. The bill would create a national cap-and-trade scheme for greenhouse gas emissions, in which polluters would mostly be allocated right-to-emit credits based on how much greenhouse gas they currently emit. The cap would get tighter over time, until by 2050, emissions would be reduced to 63% below 2005 levels. Several environmental groups expressed their encouragement at the progress in legislation on the global warming issue while at the same time expressing disappointment that the bill did not reduce emissions enough. On June 6, 2008, the bill was killed by Senate Republicans over worries that it would damage the economy.

== Bill summary ==
- Capping greenhouse emissions: The bill would impose emission limits on electric utility, transportation, and manufacturing industries.
  - Between 2005 and 2012: The bill caps emissions at 5200 million metric tons of CO_{2} equivalent, the estimated levels during 2005.
  - Between 2012 and 2020: Further reductions of 2 percent per year should result in a 15% reduction below 2005 levels.
  - Between 2020 and 2050: Emissions should be reduced by 70% by 2050.
- Transition assistance: To smooth the way for companies and individuals, the Lieberman-Warner bill includes financial incentives for reducing emissions
  - Low- and middle-income families: The legislation calls for $350 billion in assistance for low- and middle-income families though 2030. The money would come from programs such as the Low Income Weatherization Assistance Program.
  - Modernization assistance: The legislation provides $500 billion through 2030 for investments in zero- and low-carbon technologies.

== Bill progress ==
=== Subcommittee passage ===
On November 5, 2007, the Subcommittee on Private Sector and Consumer Solutions approved the measure, and recommended it to the full Committee on Environment and Public Works. During the subcommittee hearing, Sen. Bernard Sanders tried unsuccessfully to modify substantial portions of the bill, with only one proposed amendment accepted. He had attempted to "strengthen the auction of pollution allocations, lower the cap on emissions, earmark subsidies for renewable energies, demand accountability from the auto industry, and diminish industry's capacity to stall simply by buying carbon offsets."

=== Approval in Environment and Public Works Committee ===
Warner joined Democrats and Lieberman in approving the legislation on December 5, 2007, following a day of debate in the Environment and Public Works Committee. According to one report, Republican Sens. Jim Inhofe (Okla.) and Larry Craig (Idaho) offered 150 amendments to the act. In addition, The Mercury News reported that opponents "failed to amend the bill with a provision that would end the emissions caps unless China – about to become the world's largest emitter of greenhouse gases – adopted similar restrictions within 10 years." Inhofe said the bill would cost 2.3 million jobs during the next 10 years. The committee approved the legislation by an 11–8 vote.

=== On the Senate floor ===
On June 2, 2008, the bill's first day on the Senate floor, a cloture vote to override a possible filibuster passed 74–14. The remainder of the day was devoted to debating the start and length of the debate, for which Republicans wished to allot the maximum 30 hours before amendments could begin to be introduced.

The days before the vote had been marked by parliamentary maneuvers and bitter accusations over divergent estimates of the bill's future costs. On June 4, a group of GOP senators asked that the clerk of the Senate read the entire 491-page bill aloud, an extremely rare request. That took more than 10 hours.

On June 6, 2008, the bill, which had bipartisan support, fell a dozen votes short of the 60-vote threshold it needed to overcome a GOP filibuster and move to final consideration. The 48–36 vote for the climate bill came after bitter debate in which opponents charged that it would damage the U.S. economy and drive up gasoline and other energy prices. Democratic supporters of the measure accused Republicans of spreading misinformation about it.

The legislation collapsed for a variety of reasons, not the least of which was the poor timing of debating a bill predicted to increase energy costs while much of the country is focused on $4-a-gallon gas. On top of that, a number of industrial state Democrats like Sen. Sherrod Brown of Ohio were uncomfortable with the strong emissions caps that would have created a new regime of regulations for coal, auto and other manufacturing industries. Republicans, for the most part, held firm against a bill they said would cost billions in regulations while pushing the cost of gas higher. Seven Republicans, mostly moderates, voted for the procedural motion on the legislation while four Democrats voted against it.

==== Amendments ====
Amendments sponsored by Republican Sen. Bob Corker (Tenn.) address two common criticisms of the Climate Security Act: that it fails to include a way to offset increased costs for American citizens, and that it allows for the use of carbon offsets.

== Reaction ==
An October 25, 2007 editorial in the Los Angeles Times stated, "Cap-and-trade is... an extremely complex mechanism that presents irresistible opportunities for cheating and profiteering that would deeply compromise its effectiveness... Congress should be focusing on simple carbon taxes that would assess polluters for the cost of their environmental damage and offset the resulting economic loss by lowering other taxes... Currently, about a quarter of the credits would be auctioned and the rest given away. Passing out free carbon allowances that are potentially worth billions of dollars makes it almost inevitable that politicians will unfairly divvy up the spoils among their supporters. If credits are allocated based on historical emissions, those who have polluted the most in the past end up being rewarded while green projects get little or nothing. All the credits should instead be auctioned, thus leveling the playing field..."

On January 8, 2008, the Washington Post editorialized, "The Lieberman-Warner measure, an amalgamation of several other climate-change bills worked on in the Senate last year, deserves a vigorous debate. The implications it would have for the economy and the American people demand it. Such a discussion, combined with the action and debate over the House–Senate energy bill signed by President Bush last month, would demonstrate a level of urgency and engagement in Congress that has not been matched at the White House. The president's thinking on global warming has evolved over time, but he still balks at legally binding limits on carbon dioxide emissions, either through international agreements or the Lieberman-Warner bill. That shouldn't stop Congress from pushing ahead with legislation that would signal that the United States is ready to be an active part of the response to climate change."

In a June 1 article in the Washington Post, CEO of Duke Energy, Jim Rogers, stated "This is just a money grab. Only the mafia could create an organization that would skim money off the top the way this legislation would skim money off the top."

Some groups and lawmakers remained skeptical that the bill would do enough to curb emissions. A representative of the Union of Concerned Scientists said the bill was a "strong foundation" but, expressed a desire for tougher measures:

If we are to have a fighting chance to avoid the worst effects of climate change, the United States has to cut emissions by 80 percent from current levels by the middle of the century.

President Bush issued a statement on June 2 pledging to veto the bill, stating that it is too strong, and "potentially a mere floor" for carbon emissions reductions.

On CNN on June 3, Van Jones, green jobs advocate, represented the environmental community's stance on the bill, saying "We like it, but we don't love it...it underestimates the inventiveness and innovation of the American people"

== Economic impact ==
The Energy Information Administration forecasts real Gross Domestic Product to be between 0 and 1% lower in 2030 as compared with the reference scenario.
