= Ferrell Haile =

American politician

Speaker pro tempore of the Tennessee Senate
- Incumbent
- Assumed office January 19, 2018
- Preceded by: Jim Tracy

Member of the Tennessee Senate from the 18th district
- Incumbent
- Assumed office November 6, 2012
- Preceded by: Kerry Roberts
- In office November 22, 2010 – March 8, 2011
- Preceded by: Diane Black
- Succeeded by: Kerry Roberts

Personal details
- Party: Republican
- Education: Lipscomb University (attended); University of Tennessee, Knoxville (BS)

Ferrell Haile is an American politician and a Republican member of the Tennessee Senate representing District 18 since January 8, 2013. Haile previously served from his appointment November 22, 2010, to fill the vacancy caused by the resignation of Senator Diane Black until March 8, 2011.

== Education ==
Haile earned his BS in pharmacy from the University of Tennessee.

== Elections ==
- 2012 With District 18 incumbent Republican Senator Kerry Roberts redistricted to District 25 and leaving the seat open, Haile ran in the four-way August 2, 2012, Republican Primary, winning with 8,627 votes (48.2%), and won the November 6, 2012, General election with 49,472 votes (69.2%) against Democratic nominee Maria Brewer.
- 2000 To challenge District 18 incumbent Democratic Senator Joann Graves, Haile was unopposed for the August 3, 2000, Republican Primary, winning with 5,216 votes, but lost the three-way November 7, 2000, General election to Senator Graves.

Tennessee Senate
| Preceded by Jim Tracy | President pro tempore of the Tennessee Senate; 2018–present | Incumbent |
