= Eugene Delgaudio =

American politician (born 1955)

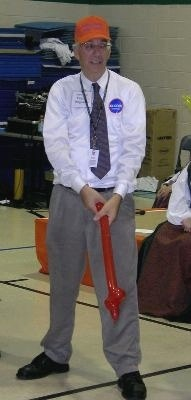
- Delgaudio in 2005

Member of the Loudoun County Board of Supervisors from the Sterling District
- In office January 1, 2000 – December 31, 2015
- Preceded by: Scott York
- Succeeded by: Koran Saines

Personal details
- Born: Eugene Anthony Delgaudio; 1955 (age 70–71))
- Party: Republican
- Website: joineugene.com

Eugene Anthony Delgaudio (born 1955) is an American politician. In 1981, he started Public Advocate of the United States, a conservative activist group known for its street theater, tax protests, and anti-LGBTQ+ efforts. He represented the Sterling District on the Board of Supervisors of Loudoun County, Virginia, from January 2000 to December 2015.

In 2002, The Washington Post said, "Delgaudio has become a leader in the nation's anti-gay rights movement". A 2003 book called him "one of the key leaders" in the conservative view of "moral health".

== Anti-gay and other political actions ==
Delgaudio was a board member of the youth group Young Americans for Freedom. His group, Public Advocate of the United States, which he has led since its founding, was designated as a hate group by the Southern Poverty Law Center in March 2012.

In addition to his activities through the Public Advocate group, Delgaudio has a history of individual public actions, against gay rights, against illegal immigrants, and for other conservative causes. His protests outside the U.S. Supreme Court and U.S. Capitol included a "Perverts for Cellucci" rally opposing the nomination of Paul Cellucci as ambassador to Canada, a man-donkey wedding to support the Federal Marriage Amendment, and a "Kennedy Sobriety Checkpoint" to draw attention to Rep. Patrick J. Kennedy's (D-RI) car accident.

In October 2005, Delgaudio appeared on Fox News, opposing the Supreme Court nomination of Harriet Miers, suggesting Ann Coulter instead. In 2007, Delgaudio asked Muslims if they "come in peace" and whether they pledge allegiance to the United States.

Delgaudio attracted media attention in February 2010 when he claimed that the Gasparilla Pirate Festival in Tampa, Florida, was being infiltrated by "radical homosexuals" seeking to exploit unsuspecting college students.

Delgaudio has made numerous public claims regarding the policy of Transportation Security Administration full-body airport security scans. In November 2010, he wrote, "It's the federal employee's version of the Gay Bill of Special Rights ... That means the next TSA official that gives you an 'enhanced pat down' could be a practicing homosexual secretly getting pleasure from your submission."

== Loudoun Board of Supervisors ==
Delgaudio was first elected to the Loudoun County Board of Supervisors in 1999, running unopposed, and was re-elected in 2003, 2007, and 2011. In his November 2015 re-election bid, he was defeated by Koran Saines.

=== Positions on county issues ===
Delgaudio has been opposed to expanding government services to undocumented immigrants He has also repeatedly expressed vehement opposition toward expanding marital rights to include same-sex partnerships.

In August 2007, Delgaudio introduced a resolution asking the county administrator to determine which county services could be denied to undocumented immigrants. Delgaudio received bipartisan criticism for characterizing anti-bullying programs as radical "pro-homosexual propaganda."

=== Investigation ===
In September 2012, a former county aide to Delgaudio, Donna Mateer, accused him of instructing her to fund raise for Public Advocate while on company time. When asked about the allegations, Delgaudio said that while it was true that his employees were asked to spend up to 60 percent of their time on fundraising, the fundraising activities were to benefit a local boys' football league.

On October 3, 2012, the Board of Supervisors voted to begin an independent investigation of the allegations made against Delgaudio in the Post article. Delgaudio spoke before the board prior to the vote, saying, "The suicide bombers of the political left pull their own rings on their detonation devices as they advance on me, and Sterling, and all honest-to-God conservatives... I stand as a small David against the foul-smelling, decaying corpse of the Washington Post."

On November 8, 2012, at the request of Loudoun Commonwealth's Attorney Jim Plowman, a special prosecutor was appointed by the Loudoun County Circuit Court to investigate Mateer's complaint. On June 24, 2013, a grand jury declined to support an indictment, noting that the alleged behavior occurred outside the one-year statute of limitations. They recommended changes to County laws.

On July 17, 2013, the all-Republican Loudoun County Board of Supervisors voted 8-1 to censure Delgaudio and make permanent earlier committee assignment removals. The Board also voted 6-3 to take away Delgaudio's staff aides and defund the Sterling District office. Earlier that day, Delgaudio had unsuccessfully petitioned the Loudoun County Circuit Court to prevent the Board from taking action.

== Post-Board of Supervisors politics ==
After losing his bid for re-election in November 2015, Delgaudio began campaigning to become a delegate to the 2016 Republican National Convention, supporting Donald Trump for President of the United States. He was instead selected as an alternate. At the convention, he grabbed the spotlight when he "clucked like a chicken" referring to the unwillingness of losing candidate Ted Cruz, to endorse nominee Donald Trump. "He needed to toughen up like every other Republican loser of any nomination battle in the last 100 (sic) years since Abraham Lincoln and just suck it up, be a man and back the nominee that he was beaten by, fair and square."

In early 2017, under Delgaudio's leadership, Public Advocate ran ads against, and Delgaudio complained that, a potential Supreme Court appointee under consideration by Donald Trump was insufficiently conservative: in his opinion, Judge Bill Pryor had not opposed the removal of Chief Justice Roy Moore from the bench. Delgaudio repeatedly stated, "No other judge has removed an elected official, like Roy Moore, for believing in God and the Ten Commandments in the history of our country,".

== Family ==
Delgaudio is married to Sheila Delgaudio and they have five children.
