= Public Advocate of the United States =

American organization advocating religious conservative politics

- Founded: 1978
- Founder: Eugene Delgaudio
- Type: Nonprofit 501(c)(4)
- Tax ID no.: 52-1112449 (EIN)
- Purpose: Public education
- Location(s): P.O. Box 1360; Merrifield, Virginia; 22116
- Region served: United States
- Members: 4
- Revenue: $1,561,374 (2016)
- Employees: 3
- Website: publicadvocateusa.org

Public Advocate of the United States is an organization founded in either 1978 or 1981 (disputed) by Eugene Delgaudio. It advocates religious conservative policies in American politics. The Southern Poverty Law Center has designated the organization as a hate group for its anti-gay activism.

== Platform ==
The organization's platform includes:

- A federal traditional marriage (man-woman) amendment to the Constitution to defend traditional marriage from assaults from those who claim to promote "same sex marriage";
- School prayer and the freedom of religious expression in public places;
- Faith-based and community initiatives;
- Pro-life legislation;
- The promotion and protection of the Boy Scouts, organized sports and other activities that reinforce morality, accountability and leadership in our youth;
- Tax cuts, reduction in spending by the federal government and the exposure of wasteful "pork barrel" spending for the benefit of liberal special interests or for social engineering for worse;
- Equality under the law, without regard to color, race, creed, sex or religious beliefs.

== Principals ==
- Eugene Delgaudio, founder and President
- Mark Clayton, Vice President and 2012 Tennessee Democratic Party nominee for U.S. Senate

In 2005, Delgadio said that he was the only full-time employee of the organization. On its 2010 tax form, Public Advocate reported $1.07 million in total revenue, and that it paid $158,682 to Eugene Delgaudio & Associates, as an independent contractor.

== Anti-gay activism ==
In early 2012, the organization was designated as a hate group by the Southern Poverty Law Center (SPLC), on the basis of its anti-gay activism.

In September 2012, the SPLC sued Public Advocate in Denver, Colorado, federal court over a mailer sent to some Colorado primary voters in 2010. The SPLC's client was a gay couple who were married in a civil ceremony in Connecticut. The mailer included a modified version of the couple's engagement photo, taken of them kissing with the Brooklyn Bridge as a backdrop. The photo had been copied without permission from the couple's blog and edited to appear as if they were kissing with snow-covered pine trees surrounding them, with bold words on a red background saying "State Senator Jean White's idea of "Family Values?"." In April 2014, a judge ruled that Public Advocate had not legally misappropriated the image, but that there was a plausible copyright infringement; in June 2014, the parties settled, with the photographer paid $2,501.

In March 2014, Public Advocate's attorney submitted a subpoena request seeking detailed information from the SPLC about the criteria, research, and decision process that was used to issue the "hate group" designation.

== See also ==
- List of organizations designated by the Southern Poverty Law Center as anti-gay hate groups
