= Janice Bowling =

American politician (born 1947)

Member of the Tennessee Senate from the 16th district
- Incumbent
- Assumed office January 8, 2013
- Preceded by: Eric Stewart

Personal details
- Born: April 1, 1947 (age 79) Selma, Alabama
- Party: Republican
- Spouse(s): Colonel Temple Bowling, IV (USAF Retired)
- Children: Temple, V; Elizabeth; Jonathan
- Education: Auburn University
- Occupation: Education; Congressional Staffer

Janice Bowling (born April 1, 1947) is an American politician in Tennessee and senator for Tennessee's 16th State Senate district. Bowling is a Republican. Bowling has been a public official and community activist in her hometown of Tullahoma, Tennessee.

== Political positions and actions ==
=== Marriage license gender restrictions ===
As a member of the Tennessee State Senate, Bowling sponsored a bill restricting the issuance of Tennessee marriage licenses to only marriages between a man and a woman, citing the Supreme Court's "Lemon Test."

Bowling's bill argued that state marriage licenses should be issued only to secular marriages, which are licenses between a man and a woman.

Although Bowling got her bill passed through committee and the Senate floor, the bill never made it out of subcommittee in the Tennessee House of Representatives and was withdrawn.

=== Early voting ===
In 2021, Bowling spoke against early voting in Tennessee, saying she believed early voting created “mischief.” She sponsored a bill reflecting her opinion but withdrew it quickly when she could find no member of the Tennessee House of Representatives willing to sponsor the bill in the house.

=== Removal of controversial Forrest bust ===
In March 2021, the Tennessee State Historical Commission voted to remove the bust of Confederate General Nathan Bedford Forrest from the Tennessee State Capitol and relocate it to the Tennessee State Museum. A controversial figure in the state's history, Forrest was a slave trader and one of the first leaders of the Ku Klux Klan.

Less than two weeks following the vote to remove Forrest's bust from the state capitol, Bowling was one of two state legislators who, instead of removing the bust of Forrest, wanted to vote to remove all 29 members of the Tennessee State Historical Commission.

The two legislators’ bills would replace all 29 members with 12 new members.

Bowling said she thought removing the bust was tantamount to the cancel culture movement, saying such cancel narratives that are “based only on fact” are a “dangerous precedent.”

=== COVID-19 ===
During the COVID-19 pandemic, Bowling expressed unverified claims about COVID-19 vaccines. In legislative hearings, Bowling said the vaccines could lead to genetic modification, a theory deemed “misinformation” by the Centers for Disease Control and Prevention.

Bowling opposed allowing COVID-19 vaccination for minors above the age of 14 and criticized the public health official who supported it by citing Tennessee law.

In July 2021, Dr. Michelle Fiscus, the medical director for vaccine-preventable diseases and immunization programs at the Tennessee Department of Health, was terminated after she sent a letter to medical providers who administer vaccines regarding vaccinating minors. In her letter, Fiscus explained the state's “Mature Minor Doctrine,” a legal mechanism based on Cardwell v. Bechtol, 724 S.W.2d. 739 (Tenn. 1987), that stated physicians may treat minors between the ages of 14 and 18 without parental consent, unless the physician believes the minor is too immature to make his or her own health-care decisions.

During a Senate hearing on Fiscus' firing, an angry Bowling argued that the state was misinterpreting its legal authority. She proposed legislation barring government mandates of COVID-19 vaccines and allowing religious exemptions. The legislation was signed into law by Republican Governor Bill Lee, effective May 25, 2021, despite the vocal and aggressive opposition of several organizations for physicians, first responders and other health-care providers.

=== Furry litter boxes ===
Bowling claimed that her rural district were providing litter boxes in schools to children that identify as cats. This claim was not substantiated.

=== 2026 Gubernatorial endorsement controversy ===
In the 2026 Tennessee gubernatorial election, Bowling broke ranks with her party to endorse independent candidate David Hatley for governor over Republican Marsha Blackburn, prompting calls for Bowling to be expelled from the state Republican Senate Caucus.
