= Bob Corker =

American businessman and politician (born 1952)

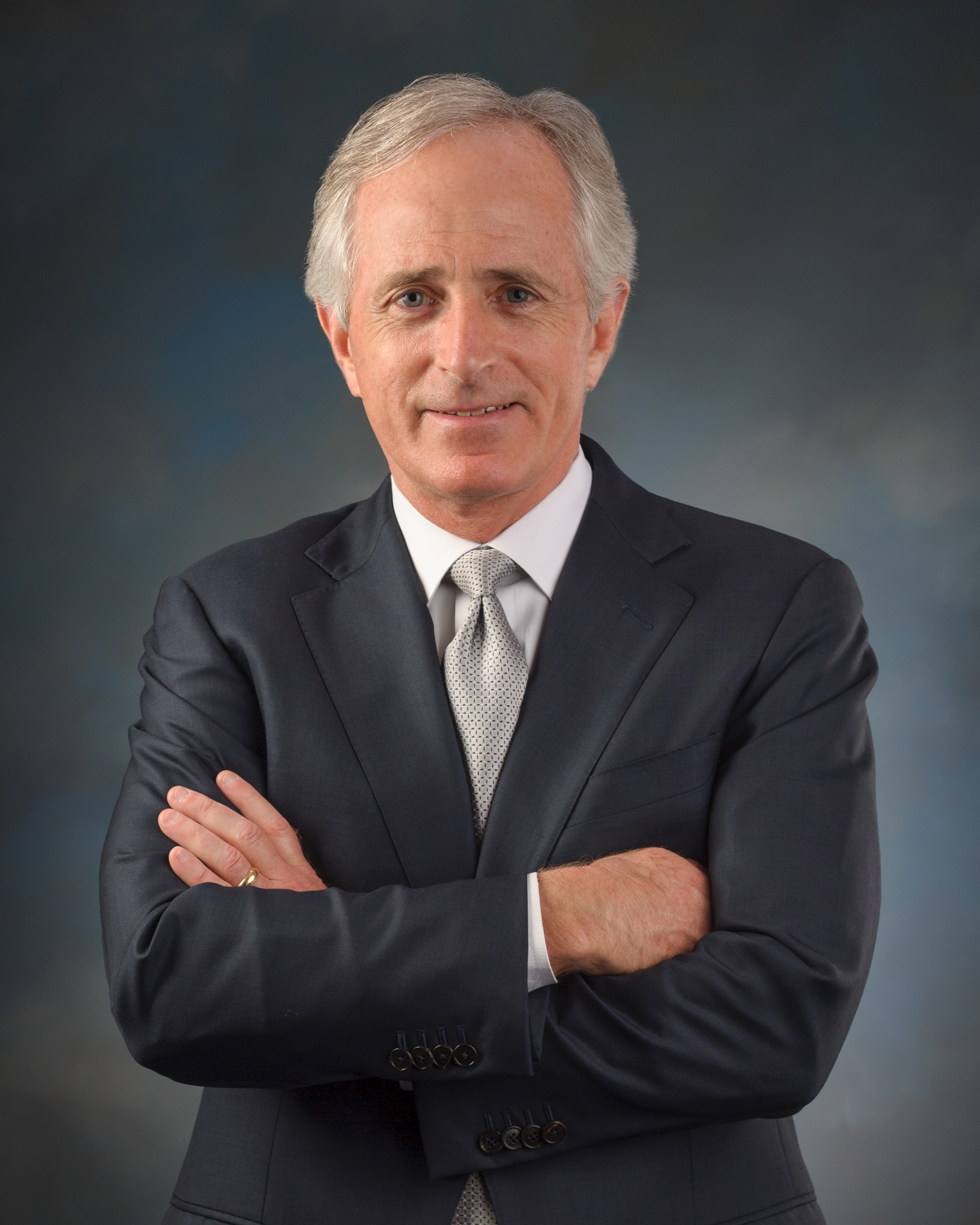
- Official portrait, 2012

Chair of the Senate Foreign Relations Committee
- In office January 3, 2015 – January 3, 2019
- Preceded by: Bob Menendez
- Succeeded by: Jim Risch

United States Senator from Tennessee
- In office January 3, 2007 – January 3, 2019
- Preceded by: Bill Frist
- Succeeded by: Marsha Blackburn

71st Mayor of Chattanooga
- In office April 16, 2001 – April 18, 2005
- Preceded by: Jon Kinsey
- Succeeded by: Ron Littlefield

Tennessee Commissioner of Finance and Administration
- In office January 1995 – July 1, 1996
- Governor: Don Sundquist
- Preceded by: David Manning
- Succeeded by: John Ferguson

Personal details
- Born: Robert Phillips Corker Jr. August 24, 1952 (age 74) Orangeburg, South Carolina, U.S.
- Party: Republican
- Spouse: Elizabeth Corker (m. 1987)
- Children: 2
- Education: University of Tennessee (BS)
- Corker's voice Corker supporting Mike Pompeo's confirmation as United States secretary of state. Recorded April 26, 2018

Robert Phillips Corker Jr. (born August 24, 1952) is an American businessman and politician who served as a United States senator from Tennessee from 2007 to 2019. A member of the Republican Party, he served as Chair of the Senate Foreign Relations Committee from 2015 to 2019.

In 1978, Corker founded a construction company, which he sold in 1990. This increased his net worth to $45 million. He ran in the 1994 United States Senate election in Tennessee but was defeated in the Republican primary by Bill Frist. In 1995, Corker was appointed by Governor Don Sundquist to be Commissioner of Finance and Administration for the State of Tennessee, following David Manning; he was succeeded by John Ferguson in 1996. He later acquired two of the largest real estate companies in Chattanooga, Tennessee, before being elected the 71st mayor of Chattanooga in March 2001; he served one term, until 2005.

Corker announced his candidacy for the 2006 United States Senate election in Tennessee after Frist announced his retirement. Corker narrowly defeated Democratic U.S. Representative Harold Ford Jr. in the general election, with 51% of the vote. In 2012 Corker was reelected, defeating Democrat Mark E. Clayton 65% to 30%. On September 26, 2017, Corker announced that he would not seek reelection in 2018; U.S. Representative and fellow Republican Marsha Blackburn was elected to succeed him.

== Early life and family ==
Corker was born in Orangeburg, South Carolina, the son of Jean J. (née Hutto) and Robert Phillips "Phil" Corker. His great-great-grandfather was U.S. Congressman Stephen A. Corker. His family moved to Tennessee when he was eleven.

Corker graduated from Chattanooga High School in 1970 and earned a Bachelor of Science degree in industrial management from the University of Tennessee in 1974. Corker is a member of Sigma Chi fraternity. Corker's roommate in the Sigma Chi fraternity was Cleveland Browns owner Jimmy Haslam, whose brother is the former Tennessee governor Bill Haslam.

During his twenties, Corker participated in a mission trip to Haiti, which he credits with inspiring him to become more active in his home community. Following his return, Corker helped found the Chattanooga Neighborhood Enterprise, a nonprofit organization that has provided low-interest home loans and home maintenance education to thousands of Tennesseans since its creation in 1986.

Corker and his wife Elizabeth, whom he married on January 10, 1987, have two daughters. The family's permanent residence is at the Anne Haven Mansion, built by Coca-Cola Bottling Company heirs Anne Lupton and Frank Harrison.

== Business career ==
In an interview with Esquire, Corker said that he started working when he was 13, collecting trash and bagging ice. Later he worked at Western Auto and as a construction laborer. After graduating from college, he worked for four years as a construction superintendent. During this time he saved up $8,000, which he used to start a construction company, Bencor, in 1978. The company's first large contract was with Krystal restaurants, building drive-through windows. The construction company became successful, growing at 80 percent per year, according to Corker, and by the mid-1980s carried out projects in 18 states. He sold the company in 1990.

In 1999, Corker acquired two of the largest real estate companies in Chattanooga: real estate developer Osborne Building Corporation and property management firm Stone Fort Land Company. In 2006, he sold the properties and assets that had formed these companies to Chattanooga businessman Henry Luken.

In recognition of his business success, in 2005 the University of Tennessee at Chattanooga named him to their "Entrepreneurial Hall of Fame." Corker has said that he believes his business background has been valuable in his political career and that experience "gives [him] unique insights and allows [him] to weigh in, in valuable ways". As of 2008, Corker's assets were estimated at more than $19 million.

== 1994 U.S. Senate campaign and Tennessee Finance Commissioner ==
Corker first ran for the United States Senate in 1994, finishing second in the Republican primary to eventual winner Bill Frist. During the primary campaign, Frist's campaign manager attacked Corker, calling him "pond scum". Despite the rhetoric, Corker arrived in Nashville the morning after the primary to offer the Frist campaign his assistance. He went on to campaign for Frist in the general election.

From 1995 to 1996, Corker was the Commissioner of Finance and Administration for the State of Tennessee, an appointed position, working for Governor Don Sundquist. One of Corker's first acts as commissioner was to encourage Sundquist to reconsider suspending construction on Bicentennial Capitol Mall State Park in Nashville.

== Mayor of Chattanooga ==
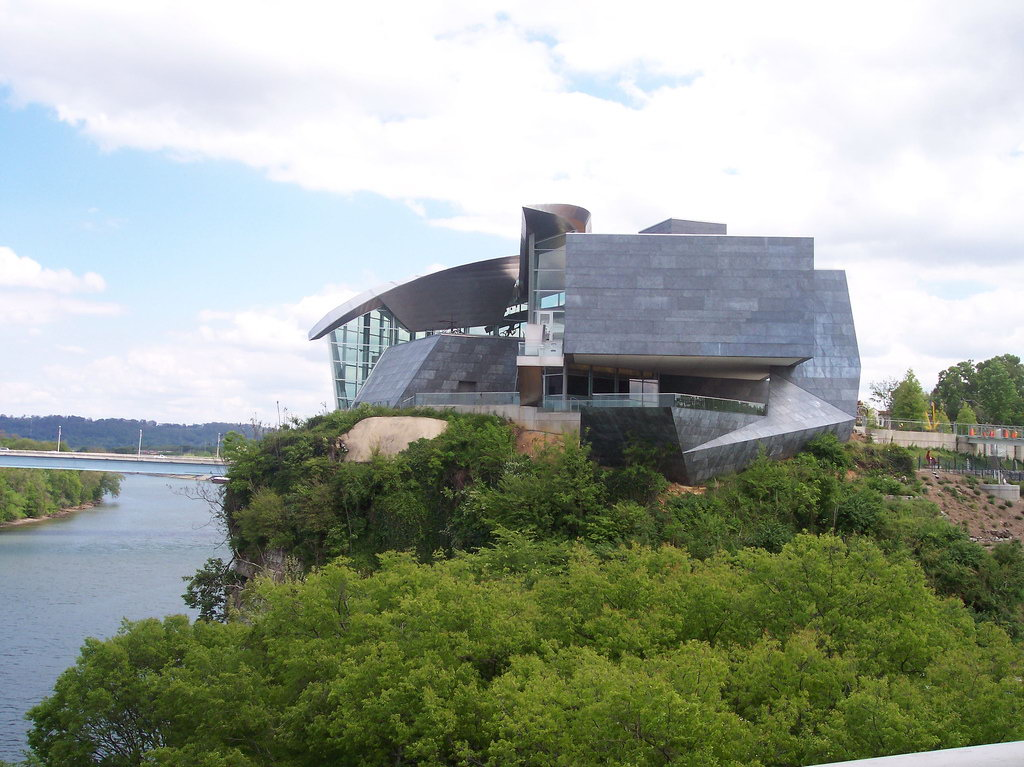
Modern extension of the Hunter Museum of American Art

Corker was elected mayor of Chattanooga in March 2001 with 54% of the vote, and served from 2001 to 2005. While in office, he outlined a bold vision and enacted a series of changes that transformed the city. He was elected on an aggressive and specific platform, focused primarily on economy development, public safety, and education. Within six months in office, he had already implemented initiatives to address each area.

With a focus on bringing good paying jobs to the city, he developed, in conjunction with the state and county, Enterprise South, a 1,200-acre industrial park, which is now home to several industries, including Volkswagen Group of America's manufacturing headquarters. He also recognized the need for access to capital to assist start up and emerging businesses and created the Chattanooga Opportunity Fund, a $1.5 million fund established for investment in locally owned start-up companies, minority owned companies, and existing small businesses. Chattanooga has since been named one of the best cities for startups by Forbes and has developed a strong, locally focused financing ecosystem.

Seeking to enhance the city's ability to recruit companies reliant on high-level technology, Corker pushed to make Chattanooga the first city with a direct fiber optic connection to Oak Ridge National Laboratory and the world's fastest computers, which helped both businesses and government advance technology use in the city.

He also laid out and executed a digital vision for the city during his tenure. He launched MetroNet with a goal of providing super-speed Gigabit Ethernet (Gig-E) connection to the Internet for businesses in the downtown and Southside. After piloting the project in City Hall and realizing the magnitude of the opportunity, he asked the Electric Power Board (EPB), the city-owned utility, to take on the task. As a result of Corker's vision and EPB's execution, Chattanooga has since been dubbed the "Gig City" and became the most connected city in the Western Hemisphere, offering Internet speeds of up to 10 gigabits per second to every home and business in EPB's 600-square mile service area.

He implemented a merit-based bonus system for teachers. The system, established in 2002, awarded teachers and principals bonuses for improving student performance at Chattanooga's lowest performing schools. Two years after its implementation, a study published in The Tennessean showed that the percentage of third graders reading at or above grade level had increased from 53% to 74%. However, a report by the think tank Education Sector suggested that specific teacher training had at least as much to do with the student improvement.

In 2003, Corker started a program called ChattanoogaRESULTS, facilitating monthly meetings with public service department administrators to evaluate their performance and set goals for improvement. The program was continued by Corker's successor, Ron Littlefield. Corker has credited the increased collaboration between departments for decreasing crime in Chattanooga. City data showed a nearly 26% decrease in crime and a 50% reduction in violent crimes between 2001 and 2004.

During his first annual State of the City address as mayor, Corker announced a $120 million riverfront renovation project and stated it would be completed in 36 months. The project was announced with no identified funding source or architectural plans. The 21st Century Waterfront Plan included an expansion of the Hunter Museum of Art, a renovation of the Creative Discovery Museum, an expansion of Chattanooga's River Walk, and the addition of a new salt water building to the Tennessee Aquarium. Corker's vision for the riverfront also included building pads for the private sector to build additional housing along the riverfront and magnificent new public parks and space for outdoor recreation. It was the largest public-private undertaking in the community's history. Half of the project was financed with a city bond, while Corker led a fundraising team in more than 81 meetings in 90 days that raised $51 million from the private sector. A hotel-motel tax was implemented in 2002 to fund the city's debt service on the bonds, fulfilling a commitment Corker made that there would be no financial burden on the citizens of Chattanooga. The 21st Century Waterfront opened 35 months later, as Corker had promised, and is widely credited with transforming the city of Chattanooga.

Corker also created Outdoor Chattanooga to promote the outdoor opportunities that exist throughout the region and claimed the city would become the "Boulder of the East." Chattanooga has since been named the "Best Town Ever" by Outside - twice - and now hosts one of the world's largest rowing regattas, as well as Ironman Triathlon races.

== U.S. Senate ==
=== 2006 ===
In 2004, Corker announced that he would seek the U.S. Senate seat to be vacated by incumbent Republican Senator Bill Frist, who had announced that he would not run for reelection. In the Republican primary, Corker faced two former congressmen, Ed Bryant and Van Hilleary. Both of his opponents ran as strong conservatives, denouncing Corker as a moderate, and even a leftist. In the course of his campaign, Corker spent $4.2 million on television advertising, especially in the western portion of the state, where he was relatively unknown. In the August primary, he won with 48% of the vote; Bryant got 34% and Hilleary got 17%.

In the general election campaign, Corker's Democratic opponent, Harold Ford, Jr., challenged him to seven televised debates across the state. In response, Corker said he would debate Ford, though he did not agree to seven debates. The two candidates eventually participated in three televised debates: in Memphis on October 7, in Chattanooga on October 10, and in Nashville on October 28.

The race between Ford and Corker was described as "among the most competitive and nasty" in the country. In October 2006, as polls indicated that Ford maintained a slight lead over Corker, the Republican National Committee ran a controversial television advertisement attacking Ford. In the 30-second ad, sound bites of "people in the street" pronouncing Ford wrong for Tennessee were interspersed with two shots of a white woman animatedly recalling meeting Ford—who is African-American and was unmarried at the time—at "the Playboy party". The ad concludes with this woman leeringly inviting Ford to phone her. Corker denounced the ad and asked that it be taken off the air. Corker won the election by less than three percentage points. He was the only non-incumbent Republican to be elected to the U.S. Senate in the 110th Congress. Corker was sworn in as Senator on January 4, 2007.

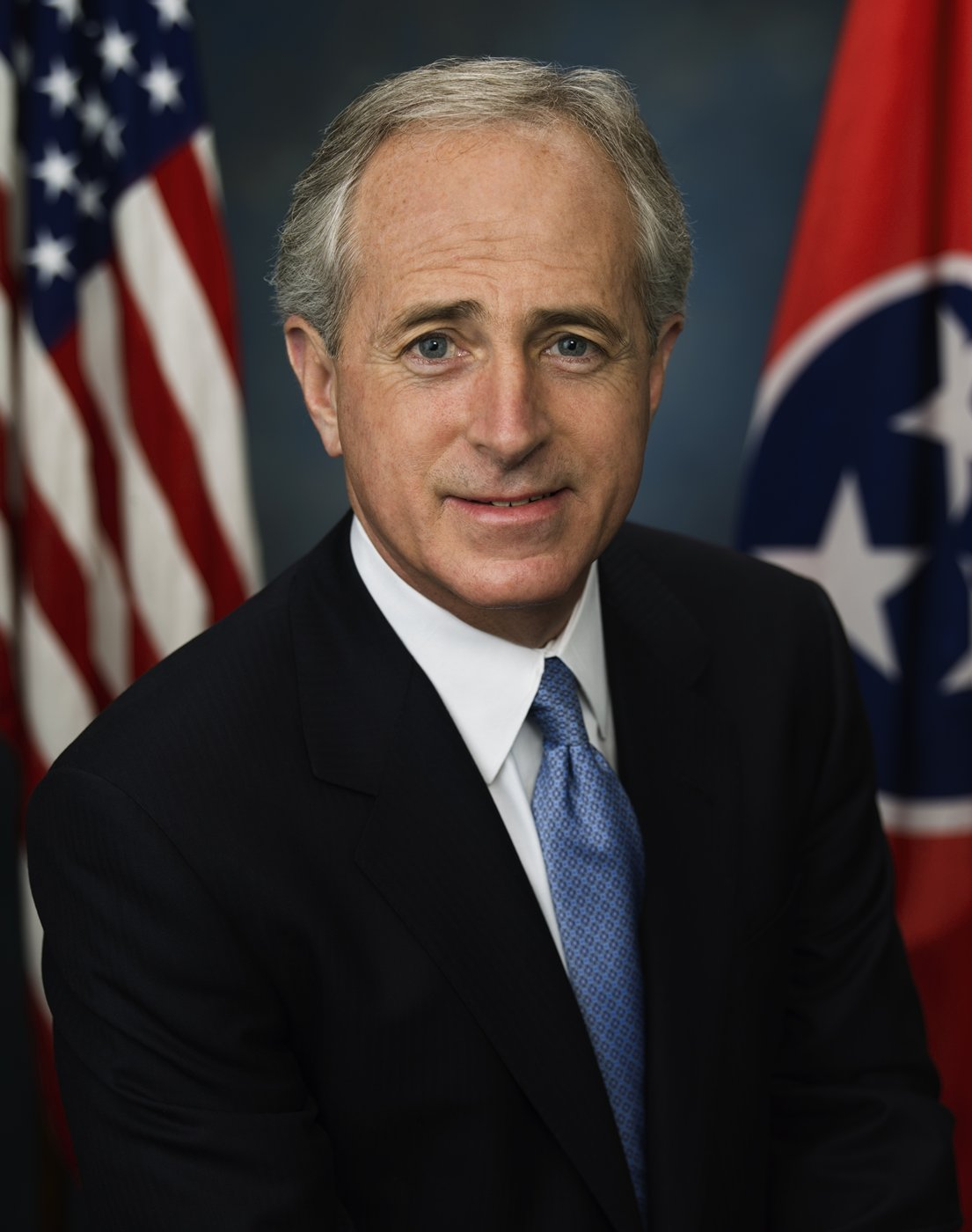
Corker Senate portrait (2007)

=== 2012 ===
In November 2012, Corker won his re-election bid with 65% of the vote. Corker faced the conservative Democrat Mark E. Clayton, from Davidson County, near Nashville, who received 30% of the general election vote. Clayton was disavowed by his own party, the leadership of which urged Democrats to write in a candidate of their choice in the race against Corker; the reason given by the party was Clayton's association with a hate group, an apparent reference to the fact that Clayton was vice president of the interest group Public Advocate of the United States, based in Washington, D.C.

=== Tenure ===
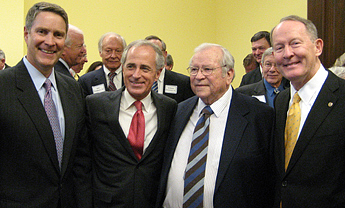
Corker was joined at his inauguration by Bill Frist, Howard Baker, and Lamar Alexander

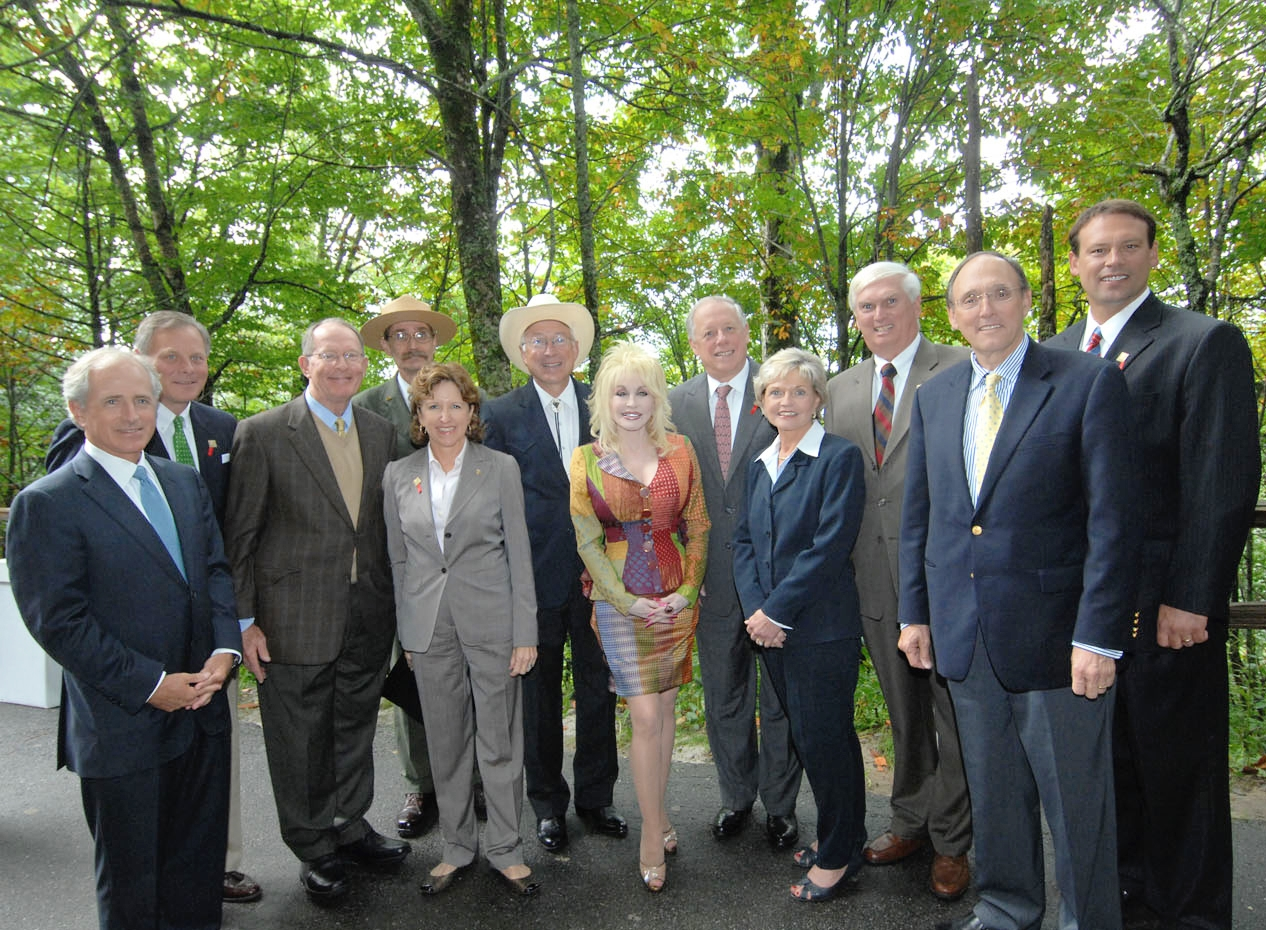
U.S. Senators Bob Corker, Richard Burr, Lamar Alexander, Kay Hagan, Congressman John Duncan, Phil Bredesen, Heath Shuler, and Dolly Parton among others at the Great Smoky Mountains National Park in 2009

Corker was one of the original members of the Gang of 10, now consisting of twenty members, which is a bipartisan coalition seeking comprehensive energy reform. The group pushed for a bill that encouraged state-by-state decisions on offshore drilling and authorized billions of dollars for conservation and alternative energy.

In June 2008, Corker was among the 36 senators who voted against a cloture motion needed to allow the further progress of the Lieberman-Warner Climate Security Act, a measure to set up a "cap-and-trade" framework to reduce greenhouse gas emissions in the United States. Shortly before, Corker had offered three amendments to the act which focused on returning as much money as possible to American consumers, in part by eliminating free allowances and international offsets. Two years later he supported a proposed Senate resolution to express disapproval of the rule submitted by the Environmental Protection Agency on its endangerment finding identifying greenhouse gases as a matter for regulation under the Clean Air Act. In spring 2011 he was a co-sponsor of the Energy Tax Prevention Act, which would have amended the Clean Air Act to prohibit the EPA from regulating greenhouse gases, and thus aimed to protect households and businesses from paying increased costs passed on to them by businesses compelled to comply with new regulations. Corker said at the time that he hoped that as an alternative to administrative regulations by the EPA, Congress would "determine a rational energy policy for the country, broadly advancing our energy security and maintaining existing policies to ensure clean air and water."

In 2008, Corker was one of the only sixteen Senators who opposed the tax rebate stimulus plan, criticizing it as "political stimulus" for electoral campaigns. He later described the stimulus package that passed Congress as "silly".

In December 2008, Corker opposed the federal bailout of failing U.S. automakers, and expressed doubt that the companies could be salvaged. Corker proposed that federal funds be provided for automakers only if accompanied by cuts in labor costs and other concessions from unions. The United Auto Workers (UAW), which had previously accepted a series of cuts in its current contract, sought to put off any further cuts until 2011, while Corker requested that cuts go into effect in 2009. Republicans blamed the UAW for failure to reach an agreement, while the UAW claimed that Corker's proposal singled out "workers and retirees for different treatment and make[s] them shoulder the entire burden of restructuring." Corker's plan to protect taxpayers through tough conditions on any federal aid, however, was ultimately embraced by both President George W. Bush, who put Corker's stipulations in an executive order, and President Barack Obama, through his auto task force.

In September 2009, Corker became the ranking member of the Senate Special Committee on Aging, replacing former Sen. Mel Martinez.

On May 20, 2010, despite his initial role as the key Republican negotiator on financial regulatory reform, Corker voted against the Senate financial regulations bill ("Restoring American Financial Stability Act", S. 3217, the Senate version of what eventually became the Dodd–Frank Wall Street Reform and Consumer Protection Act), which included provisions for increased scrutiny of financial derivatives traded by major U.S. banks and financial institutions.

Following the Senate vote, Corker expressed his disappointment with the bill, stating, among other things, that it did not adequately address concerns about the integrity of loan underwriting, or the need to strengthen bankruptcy laws, and provide for orderly liquidation. The main critique of financial reform offered by Corker at the joint House and Senate conference on Financial Regulation on June 10, 2010, was that it would hurt industry and jobs if passed.

Corker opposes limits to credit card fees imposed by banks on merchant transactions.

Corker was one of three Republicans to support the New Strategic Arms Reduction Treaty (New START) in the Senate Foreign Relations Committee in September 2010. The treaty was given final approval by the Senate in December 2010, after the chamber disposed of a raft of Republican-proposed amendments. Amendments by Corker and fellow Republican Jon Kyl on missile defense and modernization were among the few accepted. Corker was one of thirteen Republican senators to vote for the final version.

In April 2013, Corker was one of forty-six senators to vote against a bill which would have expanded background checks for all gun buyers. Corker voted with 40 Republicans and 5 Democrats to stop the passage of the bill.

Corker has called for tempering the role of outside spending in elections by giving political candidates the right to approve advertising on their behalf made by an outside party committee.

In August 2018, Corker and Bob Menendez signed a letter warning that Congress would refuse attempts by the Trump administration to form congressional appropriations for foreign aid.

In September 2018, Corker announced that he would vote for the confirmation of Brett Kavanaugh to the Supreme Court, saying in a statement, "There is no question that Judge Kavanaugh is qualified to serve on the Supreme Court, and in a different political environment, he would be confirmed overwhelmingly." On October 6, hours before Corker voted to confirm Kavanaugh, he stated during an interview that Kavanaugh's confirmation would "impact our country for more than a generation" while noting the intent of Congress to confirm additional judges throughout the remainder of the year and praising the handling of the confirmation process by Senate Majority Leader Mitch McConnell.

In a November 2018 interview, Corker stated that President Trump divided Americans as part of his attempts to appeal to his base "instead of appealing to our better angels and trying to unite us like most people would try to do". He mentioned the possibility of Trump's conduct squandering good will toward the US during a period where American leadership was "more important than ever."

In December 2018, with the possibility of a government shutdown that month looming, the House passed a bill funding the government through February and providing $5.7 billion for the border wall between the United States and Mexico favored by President Trump hours after he told House Republican leaders that he would not sign a package passed in the Senate due to it not providing money for the barrier. On December 21, after attending a meeting in the office of Senate Majority Leader Mitch McConnell, Corker announced that Senate leaders had reached an agreement on how to apply the House-passed bill and expressed hope it would ultimately lead to a deal averting a shutdown while cautioning the agreement was only on the bill's processing. In a December 23 appearance on State of the Union, Corker called the conflict between Democrats and Republicans over funding a "purposely contrived fight" that would end with American borders remaining unsecured no matter which side won and furthered that it was "a made-up fight so the president can look like he's fighting but even if he wins, our borders are going to be insecure." Corker noted that more funding was passed for border security in a 2013 amendment that received bipartisan support and opined that if Trump was more concerned about border security than politics, he would have accepted a deal offered by Senate Minority Leader Chuck Schumer the previous January that would have allocated $25 billion for border security in exchange for the reauthorization of the Deferred Action for Childhood Arrivals (DACA). Corker also predicted that the "next three months could well determine whether [Trump] decides to run again or not."

=== Committee assignments ===
- Committee on Banking, Housing, and Urban Affairs
  - Subcommittee on Housing, Transportation, and Community Development
  - Subcommittee on Securities, Insurance and Investment
  - Subcommittee on Financial Institutions and Consumer Protection
- Committee on Foreign Relations (chairman)
  - Subcommittee on African Affairs (Ex Officio)
  - Subcommittee on European Affairs (Ex Officio)
  - Subcommittee on East Asian and Pacific Affairs (Ex Officio)
  - Subcommittee on Near Eastern and South and Central Asian Affairs (Ex Officio)
  - Subcommittee on Western Hemisphere and Global Narcotics Affairs (Ex Officio)
  - Subcommittee on International Development and Foreign Assistance, Economic Affairs,
    and International Environmental Protection (Ex Officio)
  - Subcommittee on International Operations and Organizations, Human Rights, Democracy
    and Global Women's Issues (Ex Officio)
- Special Committee on Aging (Ranking member, 2009–2011)

=== Retirement ===
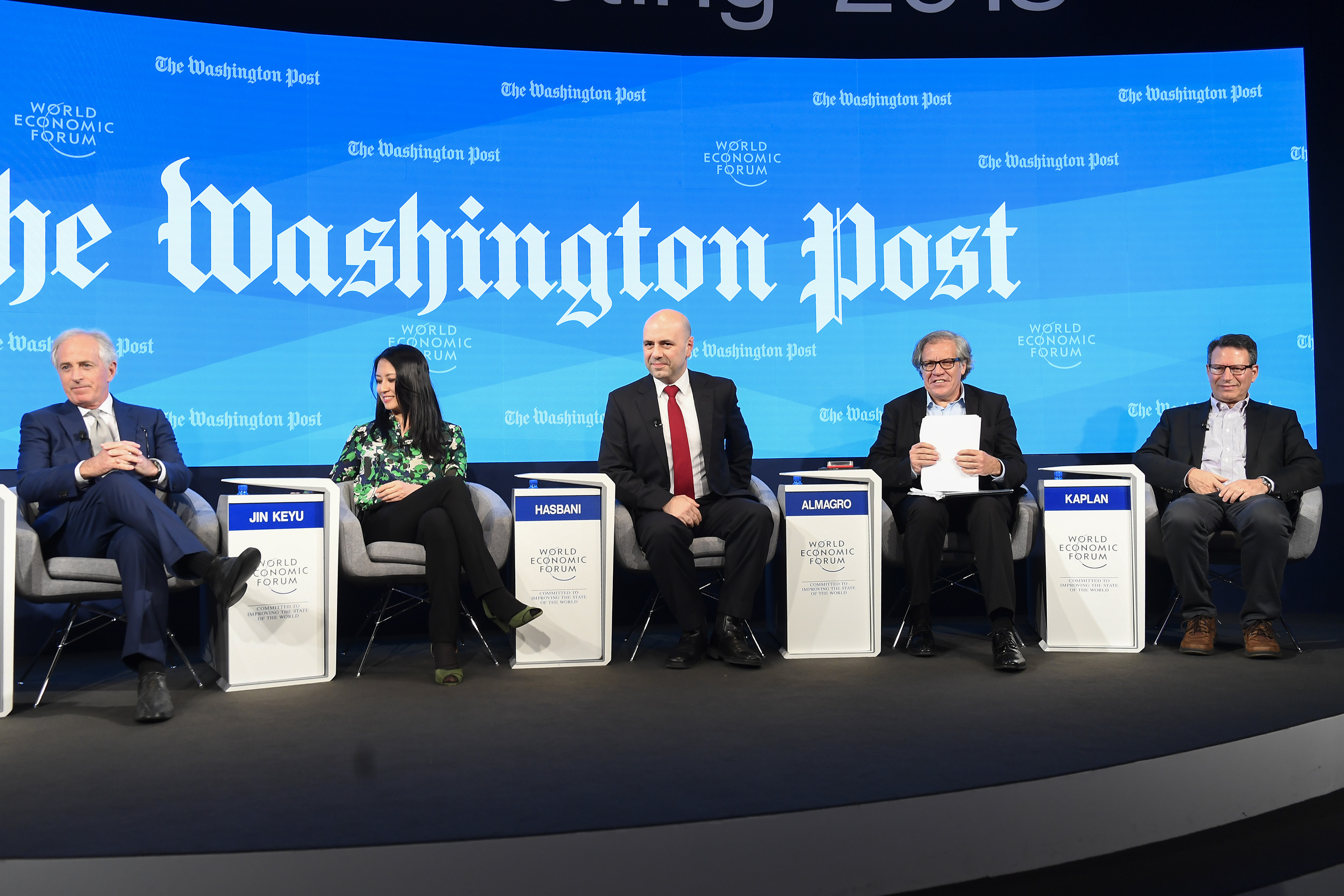
Corker (first from left), Foundations World Economic Forum, January 24, 2018.

On September 26, 2017, Corker announced that he would not seek re-election in 2018, keeping his pledge when he ran in 2006 to only serve two terms in the Senate. After announcing his retirement, Corker intensified his opposition to President Donald Trump, accusing him of lying, debasing the United States, and weakening its global standing. However, Corker refused to use his powers as Senate Foreign Relations chairman to use procedural leverage in the Senate to influence Trump's rhetoric and actions.

He joined investment bank Jefferies Financial Group Inc. as a special adviser in 2020.

== Political positions ==
Bob Corker is considered a moderate conservative. Corker scored 80% on American Conservative Union's 2017 Ratings of Congress. According to National Journal's 2009 Vote Ratings, he was ranked as the 34th most conservative member of the Senate.

111th Congress

- National Journal: 66% Conservative
  - Economic: 29% Liberal / 69% Conservative
  - Social issues: 29% Liberal / 70% Conservative
  - Foreign-policy: 41% Liberal / 56% Conservative
- Americans for Democratic Action: 10% (Liberal Score)
- National Taxpayers Union: 83% (Grade: B; Rank: 24)

=== Social policy ===
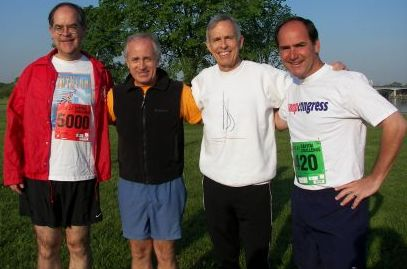
Corker with U.S. Representatives Jim Cooper, Bart Gordon, and Zach Wamp

In the 2006 primary campaign, Corker's opponents claimed he had changed his view on abortion since his first Senate campaign in 1994. Corker responded that he "was wrong in 1994" when he said that the government should not interfere with an individual's right to an abortion, stating that he now believes that life begins at conception. Corker has since changed his position and opposes abortion except when the life of the mother is endangered or in cases of rape or incest.

Corker opposes same-sex marriage. However, in 2015, Corker was one of 11 Republican Senators who voted with Democrats in support of giving social security benefits to same-sex couples living in states that had not yet recognized same-sex marriage.

In June 2018, Corker was one of thirteen Republican senators to sign a letter to Attorney General Jeff Sessions requesting a moratorium on the Trump administration family separation policy while Congress drafted legislation. In an interview that month, Corker stated that the Trump administration "obviously made a large mistake" and that he was aware "that some in the White House want to use the immigration issue as a force to activate the base for elections, but obviously the president realized that was a mistake, and now it's up to us in Congress to work with them to come up with a longer-term solution." Corker opined that the zero tolerance policy was part of a larger issue of Congress having failed to address existing immigration problems in the US.

=== Fiscal policy ===
In 2006, Corker supported making the 2001 tax cut and the 2003 tax cut permanent. He has shown interest in replacing the federal progressive income tax with a flat tax.

He endorsed the initial $350 billion of TARP funding in 2008, and opposed releasing the additional $350 billion of it in 2009.

In 2011, Corker voted in favor of the Republican alternative budget proposed by Representative Paul Ryan (R-WI), a proposal that would eliminate the healthcare provided through the Medicare program and instead give seniors subsidies for part of the cost of obtaining private medical insurance. Corker referred to such programs as Medicare and Social Security as "generational theft".

In 2013, Corker endorsed the Marketplace Fairness Act and voted for its passage in the Senate. The Marketplace Fairness Act would enable states to begin collecting sales taxes on online purchases.

Corker was the only Republican senator to vote against the Senate version of the Tax Cuts and Jobs Act of 2017 before it was sent to a conference committee with the House, citing concerns about the deficit. On December 20, 2017, Corker, who previously said he would "take a close look at the product developed in conference before making a decision on the final legislation," voted in favor of the Tax Cuts and Jobs Act conference report, saying, "In the end, after 11 years in the Senate, I know every bill we consider is imperfect and the question becomes is our country better off with or without this piece of legislation. I think we are better off with it. I realize this is a bet on our country's enterprising spirit, and that is a bet I am willing to make."

IB Times said that a provision newly added to the final version of the bill, which some termed the "pass-through provision", could financially benefit the Trump family and several congressional Republicans, including Corker. For example, the top 20% of Americans by income have received more than 60% of the tax savings. After two years, the tax cuts never paid for itself with economic growth, according to Maya MacGuineas, president of the Committee for a Responsible Federal Budget.

=== Foreign policy ===
Corker traveled to Iraq for the first time as a senator in February 2007 as a member of the Foreign Relations Committee to study the situation on the ground. In March 2007, he subsequently expressed his opposition to an arbitrary withdrawal deadline of U.S. troops in Iraq and declared his support for General David Petraeus's counterinsurgency strategy. Corker said that any further reduction in U.S. forces in Iraq should be based on improved conditions in the country. In May 2008, Corker and Democratic U.S. Senator Bob Casey advocated for greater burden sharing among Iraq's neighbors in funding reconstruction efforts in the country.

In April 2009, Corker criticized President Obama's Afghan war strategy, which boosted civilian efforts to rebuild the impoverished country and placed nuclear-armed Pakistan at the center of the fight: "I have no idea what it is, other than sending additional troops. I hope we dig a lot deeper," said Corker. He expected that the United States is having to build the economic and governmental structure of Afghanistan after decades of war.

In September 2009, during a Special Committee on Aging hearing, Corker told former Canadian Public Health Minister Carolyn Bennett that Canada was living off the United States by setting lower healthcare prices and that "all the innovation, all the technology breakthroughs just about take place in our country and we have to pay for it." Corker stated that the US was not really the problem but rather "sort of the parasitic relationship that Canada, and France, and other countries have towards us" and affirmed his opposition to this policy.

In October 2013, Corker said of American involvement in Syria, "I think our help to the opposition has been an embarrassment and I find it appalling you would sit here and act as if we're doing the things we said we'd do three months ago, six months ago, nine months ago." In February 2016, Corker stated his belief that the European Union had become open to President of Syria Bashar al-Assad remaining in power "for a while and they look at that as a better case than the chaos" as well as crediting Russian president Vladimir Putin with playing "the cards that he has in a masterful way and taken advantage of a nation that is not willing to lead". Corker furthered that the US not intervening in Syria with a strike in 2013 "said to the world that we could not be counted on" and that the US propped up Assad more than any other country. During the confirmation hearings of Mike Pompeo in April 2018, President Trump's nominee for secretary of state, Pompeo pointed to the US military killing Russians in Syria as proof of the administration's strength against Russia. Corker thanked him for mentioning the strike, saying, "I don't think enough has been said or made of the fact the Russia crossed the Euphrates with their own troops and were annihilated, and it was really a strong statement that I don't think many are paying as much attention to as should."

In April 2015, Corker's position on Iraq was that turmoil in the Middle East predated Barack Obama's presidency, and that by invading Iraq in 2003 the U.S. "took a big stick and beat a hornets' nest", unleashing rivalries that might take decades to resolve.

In March 2016, following reports that Iran conducted ballistic missile tests, Corker encouraged the Obama administration and United Nations to demonstrate that Iran would face "swift and immediate consequences." In October 2017, amid the feud between Corker and President Trump, White House Press Secretary Sarah Huckabee Sanders stated, "Sen. Corker worked with Nancy Pelosi and the Obama administration to pave the way for that legislation and basically rolled out the red carpet for the Iran deal, and those are pretty factual." The claim was refuted by Corker's communications director and news outlets. In December 2018, President Trump wrote of Corker's involvement with the Iran nuclear deal, "For all of the sympathizers out there of Brett McGurk remember, he was the Obama appointee who was responsible for loading up airplanes with 1.8 Billion Dollars in CASH & sending it to Iran as part of the horrific Iran Nuclear Deal (now terminated) approved by Little Bob Corker."

During the war in Donbas, Corker supported supplying Ukraine with lethal weapons.

In 2017, Corker criticized President Trump's tweets against North Korea as impulsive. He said, "A lot of people think that there is some kind of 'good cop, bad cop' act underway, but that's just not true." He further expressed concern that Trump's reckless behavior could lead to war. Corker's comments were not met with public dissent; Republicans appeared to agree with Corker. In April 2018, Corker stated that North Korean leader Kim Jong-un viewed "having deliverable nuclear weapons as his ticket to dying as an old man in his bed" after seeing Libyan leader Muammar Gaddafi die following surrendering his nuclear weapons and that it was not realistic for the Trump administration to "think that someone's going to go in and charm him out of" the nuclear weapons.

In October 2017, Corker confirmed that he was engaged in discussions with Ranking Democrat on the Foreign Relations Committee Ben Cardin on creating a bipartisan plan that would meet the wishes of President Trump for a stronger nuclear agreement with Iran and that they hoped the final version of the legislation "would pass with 80 to 85 votes by the time we're through with it." In January 2018, Corker warned that pulling out of the Iran nuclear deal would have negative consequences for a treaty with North Korea: "I hope at some point we're going to enter into a very binding agreement with North Korea, and if it's believed that we withdrew from a military agreement when there aren't material violations — there's some technical violations, but not material violations — then it makes it more difficult for people to believe we're going to abide by another agreement."

In October 2017, Corker said he would "get on the phone with someone" within a day to get answers to why the Trump administration had missed the October 1 deadline to install penalties on Russian entities. In April 2018, Corker stated that relations between the United States and Russia were at their lowest point since the Cuban Missile Crisis and that Congress "should be aware that miscalculations could lead us to a very bad place."

Corker supported President Donald Trump's decision to recognize Jerusalem as Israel's capital.

In April 2018, Corker was one of six senators to introduce bipartisan legislation meant to update authorization for the use of military force (AUMF) by replacing the 2001 and 2002 bills that authorized the wars in Afghanistan and Iraq and in subsequent years used as the basis for military action against terrorist groups. In his accompanying statement, Corker noted previous attempts to update the authorizations and admitted that there was "still work ahead".

==== Saudi Arabia ====
Corker received campaign donations from Saudi Arabia's lobbyists.

In June 2017, Corker voted against a resolution by Rand Paul and Chris Murphy that would block President Trump's $510 million sale of precision-guided munitions to Saudi Arabia that made up a portion of the $110 billion arms sale Trump announced during his visit to Saudi Arabia the previous year. Corker reasoned that Saudi Arabia had already acquired the American bombs and that the resolution "is one of those things you're cutting your nose off to spite your face, and I think some are doing it because it's something Trump is proposing."

In March 2018, Corker voted to table a resolution spearheaded by Bernie Sanders, Chris Murphy, and Mike Lee that would have required President Trump to withdraw American troops either in or influencing Yemen within the next 30 days unless they were combating Al-Qaeda.

In October 2018, Corker sent a letter to President Trump over the disappearance of the Saudi journalist Jamal Khashoggi, which "instructs the administration to determine whether Khashoggi was indeed kidnapped, tortured, or murdered by the Saudi government and...to respond within 120 days with a determination of sanctions against individuals who may have been responsible." In late November 2018 in an initial procedural step, Senator Corker joined with others backing an effort to suspend U.S. support for the Saudi-led war in Yemen. Corker told reporters, "We also have a crown prince that's out-of-control — a blockade in Qatar, the arrest of a prime minister in Lebanon, the killing of a journalist — whether there is a smoking gun, I don't think there is anybody in the room that doesn't believe he was responsible for it." During late December 2018, he stated he would introduce a resolution directly naming Mohammed Bin Salman as "responsible" for Khashoggi's death. About the resolution, Corker stated it was a "strong denouncing of a crown prince and holding them responsible for the murder of a journalist", further considering it a "pretty strong statement for the United States Senate to be making, assuming we can get a vote on it." The resolution comfortably passed the Senate on December 13, 2018, the same day it also and approved a measure to pull support from the Saudi military campaign in Yemen.

=== Healthcare policy ===
In September 2009, Corker opposed a health-care reform amendment that would legally allow Americans to buy cheaper Canadian drugs. He opposed President Barack Obama's health reform legislation. He voted against the Patient Protection and Affordable Care Act in December 2009, and he voted against the Health Care and Education Reconciliation Act of 2010.

In late February 2010, Corker became the sole senator to back retiring Senator Jim Bunning of Kentucky in filibustering a 30-day extension of expiring unemployment and COBRA benefits.

Amid Republican efforts to repeal the ACA following the election of Trump, Corker said in July 2017 he would support a repeal bill in the Senate even if it did not include a replacement effort.

In October 2017, Lamar Alexander and Patty Murray introduced a bipartisan stabilization package for exchanges as part of attempts to stabilize the ACA's individual insurance exchanges, Alexander announcing Corker as one of the eleven other Republican senators cosponsoring the legislation.

=== Trade ===
In January 2018, Corker was one of thirty-six Republican senators to sign a letter to President Trump requesting he preserve the North American Free Trade Agreement (NAFTA) by modernizing it for the economy of the 21st century.

In May 2018, following President Trump announcing plans to impose tariffs on steel and aluminum toward Mexico, Canada, and the European Union, Corker said that placing tariffs "on our most important trading partners is the wrong approach and represents an abuse of authority intended only for national security purposes."

At a July 2018 hearing on tariff policy, Corker stated, "I'm very concerned about the president's trade policies and I think we all should be. These actions are hurting our business and farm communities all around the country. They're damaging our international relationships."

In September 2018, after President Trump announced tariffs on 200 billion worth of goods from China, Corker stated that the move was misrepresented and Americans would be paying for the tariffs. Corker stated that while China was using the US and other countries to its advantage, the administration had not articulated what the US hoped to achieve with imposing the tariffs.

=== Environment ===
In late 2004 while mayor of Chattanooga, Corker requested the Tennessee Department of Transportation to reduce the speed limits on Interstate Highways and other four-lane controlled-access highways in Hamilton County from 70 miles per hour (110 km/h) to 65 miles per hour (105 km/h) and 55 miles per hour (89 km/h) for trucks in an effort to reduce particulate air pollution after Chattanooga failed to meet the EPA's requirements for air quality.

While Corker has not fully accepted the scientific consensus that global warming is dangerous, progressing, and primarily caused by humans, in 2015 he supported a resolution expressing that humans do contribute to it. He favors imposing a tax on carbon. Corker opposed John McCain's 2008 campaign proposal to suspend the 18-cents-per-gallon federal gasoline tax, calling it "pandering extraordinaire".

== Controversies ==
=== Sale of protected wetlands ===
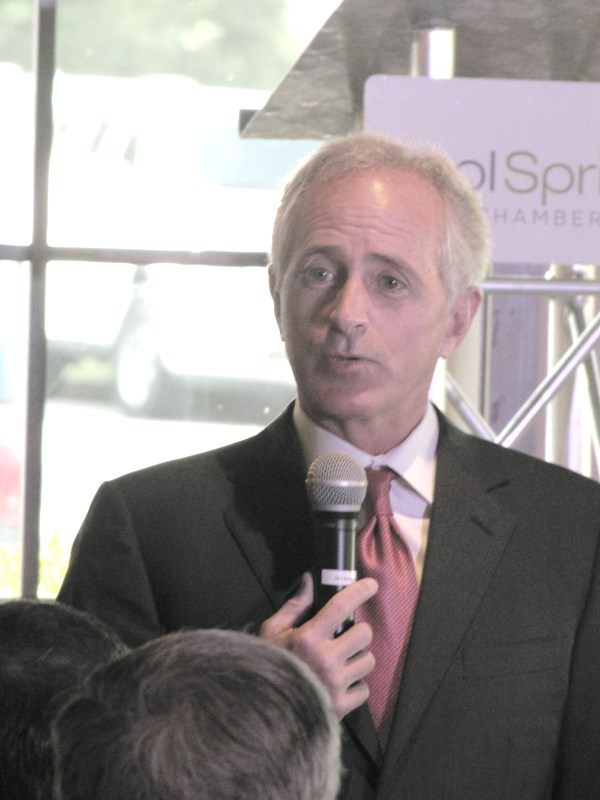
Corker speaking at the Brentwood Cool Springs Chamber of Commerce breakfast in 2010

In 2003, Osborne Enterprises, an affiliate of the real estate company Corker Group, sold protected wetlands near South Chickamauga Creek in Chattanooga to Wal-Mart for $4.6 million. In July 2003 environmental educator Sandy Kurtz filed a restraining order to stop the construction of the Wal-Mart. After briefly being upheld, the lawsuit was dismissed on July 15, 2003. The Wal-Mart opened in May 2004.

Attorney Joe Prochaska, who represented Kurtz, served from 1992 to 1997 as a member of the Davidson County Democratic Party's executive committee. Prochaska accused Corker of selling the land shortly after the construction easement was approved. However, public records show that the land was approved for development by the city prior to Corker becoming mayor in April 2001. As part of the development plans, the Corps of Engineers approved the filling in of 2.5 acres of the wetlands, to widen an access road, in exchange for the creation of an additional 11 acres of new wetlands in a nearby area. Public records show no involvement of Corker in the approval process.

In 2006, during Corker's United States Senate campaign against Democrat Harold Ford Jr., a second lawsuit was filed by Kurtz, again represented by Prochaska, and the Tennessee Environmental Council. The lawsuit accused Wal-Mart of encroaching onto an adjacent protected nature area that was also held by a company owned by Corker. The suit alleged that Corker did not fully disclose his interest in the property where the Wal-Mart was built or in the adjacent nature area at the time the deal was made. The Corker campaign countered that an article published on March 5, 2003, in the Chattanooga Times Free Press publicly identified Corker's ownership interest in the land, through Osborne Enterprises, and that as mayor, a blind trust barred Corker from being involved in issues like these that affected his business.

On October 13, 2006, lawyers involved in the case announced a settlement agreement. Details of the settlement were not announced, but court records indicate that a portion of the settlement involved a 45-day option for the Tennessee Environmental Council to purchase over 13 acres (53,000 m^{2}) of the land in dispute that the Council hopes to dedicate for public use.

=== Blind trust ===
Shortly after taking office as mayor, Corker voluntarily placed his Hamilton County real estate holdings and businesses into a blind trust to avoid "even the perception of any conflict". Corker stated that the visibility of his properties and public knowledge of his ownership in them served as another check on his actions as mayor.

On October 11, 2006, The Commercial Appeal reported that the blind trust that Corker set up to run his businesses to avoid conflicts of interest while he was mayor "may not have been all that blind". According to e-mails discovered by the Appeal (some of which had previously presumed to be lost):

Corker met often with employees from his private companies while mayor from 2001 to 2005, and he shared business tips with others. Corker also got help organizing his 2001 mayoral campaign from City Hall, where a government secretary passed on voting lists and set up meetings for the millionaire commercial real estate developer.

The e-mails show that Corker often met with officials from his private company, the Corker Group, which was part of the blind trust, while he was mayor. When asked about these e-mails by the Appeal, Corker said that he thought the blind trust had "worked very well" and that he had sold most of his business holdings so that he could avoid the appearance of conflicts of interest in the Senate.

=== Volkswagen ===
In 2014, Corker, a long-time opponent of unions in Tennessee, tried to influence the ballot election of blue-collar workers at the Chattanooga Volkswagen plant whether to allow the United Auto Workers to represent them.

On the first day of the three-day election, Corker said that he "had conversations" and "based on those am assured that should the workers vote against the UAW, Volkswagen will announce in the coming weeks that it will manufacture its new mid-size SUV here in Chattanooga." Corker's public statement went counter to statements by Volkswagen officials in the lead-up to the vote that the outcome of the vote would not affect the determination of whether the SUV would be made in Chattanooga or at the Puebla, Mexico, plant. National Labor Relations Board expert Kenneth G. Dau-Schmidt of Indiana University Bloomington said that Corker's remarks were "shocking" and an attempt to intimidate workers into voting against UAW representation. The UAW was dealt a "stinging defeat" after a majority of employees at the Volkswagen plant voted against joining the union.

== Electoral history ==
Republican primary results in Tennessee, U.S. Senate, 2006
Party	Candidate	Votes	%
Republican	Bob Corker	231,541	48.13%
Republican	Ed Bryant	161,189	33.50%
Republican	Van Hilleary	83,078	17.27%
Republican	Tate Harrison	5,309	1.10%
Total votes		481,117	100

2006 United States Senate election, Tennessee
Party	Candidate	Votes	%	±%
Republican	Bob Corker	929,911	50.7	−14.4
Democratic	Harold Ford, Jr.	879,976	48.0	+15.8
Independent	Ed Choate	10,831	0.6	n/a
Independent	David "None of the Above" Gatchell	3,746	0.2	n/a
Independent	Emory "Bo" Heyward	3,580	0.2	n/a
Independent	H. Gary Keplinger	3,033	0.2	n/a
Green	Chris Lugo	2,589	0.1	n/a
Majority		49,935	2.7	
Turnout		1,833,693		
Republican hold		Swing	-15.1	

Republican primary results in Tennessee, U.S. Senate, 2012
Party	Candidate	Votes	%
Republican	Bob Corker (incumbent)	389,483	85.1
Republican	Zach Poskevich	28,299	6.2
Republican	Fred Anderson	15,942	3.6
Republican	Mark Twain Clemens	11,788	2.6
Republican	Brenda Lenard	11,378	2.5
Total votes		456,890	100

United States Senate election in Tennessee, 2012
Party	Candidate	Votes	%	±%
Republican	Bob Corker (incumbent)	1,506,443	64.89%	+14.18%
Democratic	Mark Clayton	705,882	30.41%	−17.59%
Green	Martin Pleasant	38,472	1.66%	+1.52%
Independent	Shaun Crowell	20,936	0.90%	N/A
Constitution	Kermit Steck	18,620	0.80%	N/A
Independent	James Higdon	8,085	0.35%	N/A
Independent	Michael Joseph Long	8,080	0.35%	N/A
Independent	Troy Stephen Scoggin	7,148	0.31%	N/A
Independent	David Gatchell	6,523	0.28%	N/A
n/a	Write-ins	1,288	0.05%	N/A
Total votes		'2,321,477'	'100.0%'	N/A
Republican hold				

Political offices
Preceded by Jon Kinsey	Mayor of Chattanooga; 2001–2005	Succeeded by Ron Littlefield
Party political offices
Preceded by Bill Frist	Republican nominee for U.S. Senator from Tennessee (Class 1); 2006, 2012	Succeeded by Marsha Blackburn
U.S. Senate
Preceded by Bill Frist	U.S. Senator (Class 1) from Tennessee; 2007–2019; Served alongside: Lamar Alexander	Succeeded by Marsha Blackburn
Preceded by Mel Martínez	Ranking Member of the Senate Aging Committee; 2009–2013	Succeeded by Susan Collins
Preceded by Richard Lugar	Ranking Member of the Senate Foreign Relations Committee; 2013–2015	Succeeded by Bob Menendez
Preceded by Bob Menendez	Chair of the Senate Foreign Relations Committee; 2015–2019	Succeeded by Jim Risch
U.S. order of precedence (ceremonial)
Preceded by Chuck Robb as Former U.S. Senator	Order of precedence of the United States as Former U.S. Senator	Succeeded by Rob Portman as Former U.S. Senator
