= 2012 United States Senate election in Tennessee =

- November 6, 2012
- Turnout: 61.86% ▲11.89 pp
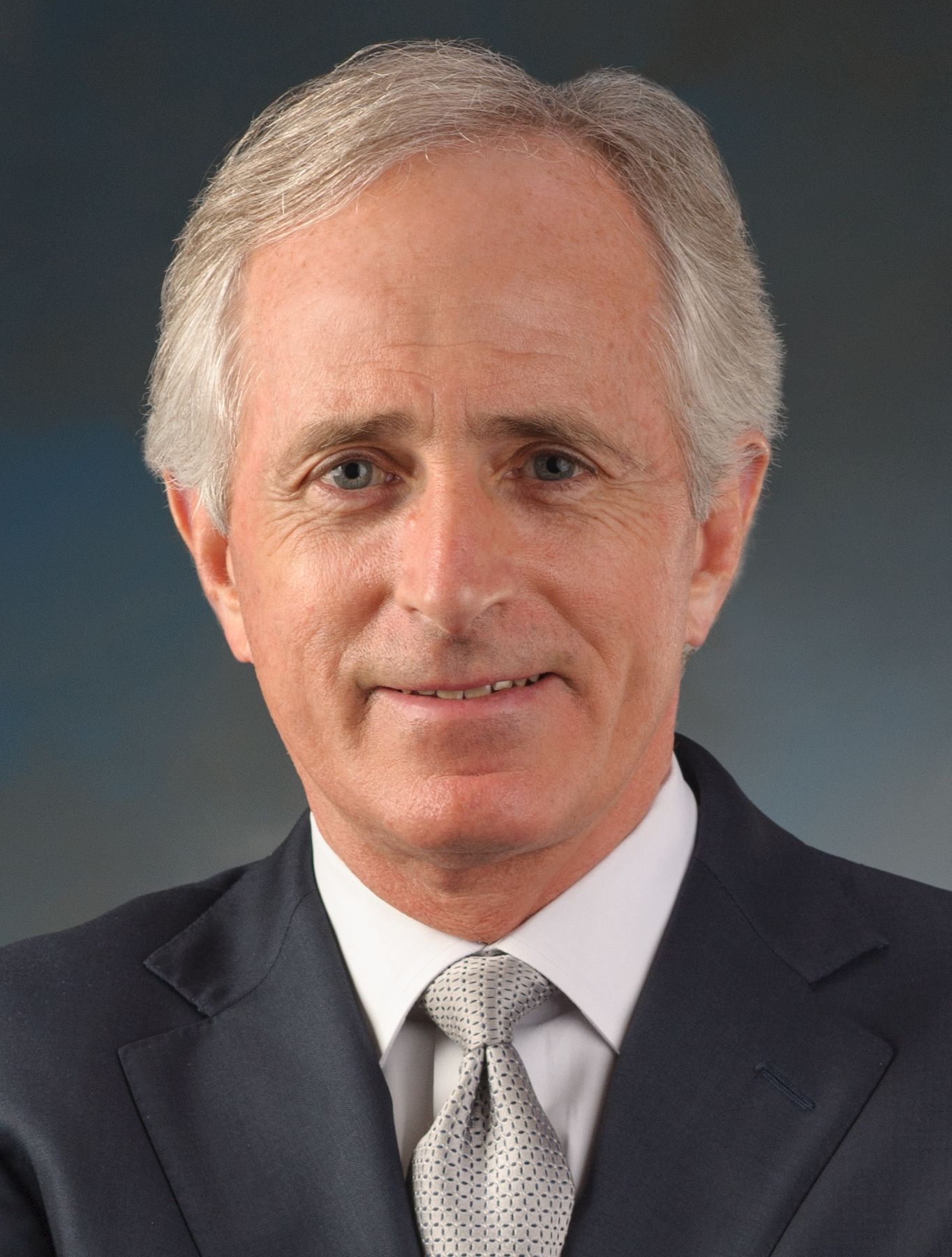

Nominee	Bob Corker	Mark Clayton
Party	Republican	Democratic
Popular vote	1,506,443	705,882
Percentage	64.89%	30.41%
- Corker: 40–50% 50–60% 60–70% 70–80% 80–90% Clayton: 50–60% 60–70%
U.S. senator before election
Bob Corker
Republican
Elected U.S. Senator
Bob Corker
Republican

The 2012 United States Senate election in Tennessee took place on November 6, 2012, as part of the general election including the 2012 U.S. presidential election, elections to the House of Representatives and various state and local elections. Incumbent Republican U.S. Senator Bob Corker won a second term in a landslide, carrying all but two counties in the state.

Corker narrowly flipped reliably Democratic Davidson County, home to Nashville, which had not voted Republican on the presidential level since 1988. He faced Democratic nominee Mark E. Clayton as well as several third-party candidates and several independents in this election.

Corker easily won the Republican primary with 85% of the vote, and anti-LGBT activist and conspiracy theorist Clayton won the Democratic nomination with 30% of the vote, despite raising no money and having a website that was four years out of date.

The next day Tennessee's Democratic Party disavowed Clayton over his active role in the Public Advocate of the United States, which they described as a "known hate group". They blamed his victory among candidates for whom the TNDP provided little forums to become known on the fact that his name appeared first on the ballot, and said they would do nothing to help his campaign, urging Democrats to vote for "the write-in candidate of their choice" in November. One of the Democratic candidates, Larry Crim, filed a petition seeking to offer the voters a new primary in which to select a Democratic nominee among the remaining candidates the party had affirmed as bona fide and as a preliminary motion sought a temporary restraining order against certification of the results, but after a judge denied the temporary order Crim withdrew his petition.

== Background ==
The incumbent in the race, former Chattanooga mayor Bob Corker, was elected in 2006 with 50.7% of the vote in a win against U.S. representative Harold Ford, Jr.

== Republican primary ==
=== Candidates ===
==== Declared ====
- Fred R. Anderson
- Mark Twain Clemens, unemployed
- Bob Corker, incumbent U.S. Senator
- James Durkan, businessman
- Brenda Lenard, businesswoman & doctoral student
- Zach Poskevich, technology consultant

==== Publicly Speculated, but Declined ====
- Hank Williams, Jr., country music entertainer

=== Polling ===
Hypothetical polling

Poll source	Date(s) administered	Sample size	Margin of error	Bob Corker	More conservative challenger	Other	Undecided
Public Policy Polling	February 9–13, 2011	400	±4.9%	38%	43%	—	19%

Poll source	Date(s) administered	Sample size	Margin of error	Bob Corker	Marsha Blackburn	Other	Undecided
Public Policy Polling	February 9–13, 2011	400	±4.9%	50%	30%	—	20%

Poll source	Date(s) administered	Sample size	Margin of error	Bob Corker	Hank Williams, Jr.	Other	Undecided
Public Policy Polling	February 9–13, 2011	400	±4.9%	66%	13%	—	21%

=== Results ===
Tennessee Republican primary
Party	Candidate	Votes	%
Republican	Bob Corker (Incumbent)	389,483	85.25%
Republican	Zach Poskevich	28,299	6.19%
Republican	Fred Anderson	15,942	3.49%
Republican	Mark Twain Clemens	11,788	2.58%
Republican	Brenda Lenard	11,378	2.49%
Total votes		456,890	100.00%

== Democratic primary ==
=== Candidates ===
==== Declared ====
- Mark E. Clayton, Vice President of the nonprofit organization Public Advocate of the United States and candidate for the U.S. Senate in 2008
- Larry Crim, nonprofit executive
- Gary Gene Davis
- Dave Hancock
- Park Overall, actress
- Thomas K. Owens
- Benjamin Roberts

=== Results ===
Results by county: Clayton: 20–30%; 30–40%; 40–50%; 50–60%; Davis: 20–30%; 30–40%; 40–50%; Overall: 20–30%; 30–40%; 40–50%; 60–70%; Hancock: 30–40%

Democratic primary results
Party	Candidate	Votes	%
Democratic	Mark E. Clayton	48,126	29.99%
Democratic	Gary Gene Davis	24,789	15.45%
Democratic	Park Overall	24,263	15.12%
Democratic	Larry Crim	17,383	10.83%
Democratic	Benjamin Roberts	16,369	10.20%
Democratic	David Hancock	16,167	10.08
Democratic	Thomas Owens	13,366	8.33
Total votes		160,463	100.00

== General election ==
=== Candidates ===
- Bob Corker (Republican), incumbent U.S. Senator
- Mark E. Clayton (Democratic)
- Shaun Crowell (Libertarian)
- Martin Pleasant (Green)
- Kermit Steck (Constitution)
- David Gatchell (independent)
- James Higdon (independent)
- Michel Joseph Long (independent)
- Troy Stephen Scoggin (independent)
- Jacob Maurer (Write-In)

=== Predictions ===
Source	Ranking	As of
The Cook Political Report	Solid R	November 1, 2012
Sabato's Crystal Ball	Safe R	November 5, 2012
Rothenberg Political Report	Safe R	November 2, 2012
Real Clear Politics	Safe R	November 5, 2012

=== Polling ===
Poll source	Date(s) administered	Sample size	Margin of error	Bob Corker (R)	Mark Clayton (D)	Other	Undecided
Issues and Answers Network Inc.	October 16–21, 2011	609	±4%	59%	21%	4%	15%

Hypothetical polling

Poll source	Date(s) administered	Sample size	Margin of error	Bob Corker (R)	Phil Bredesen (D)	Other	Undecided
Public Policy Polling	February 9–13, 2011	500	±4.4%	41%	46%	—	12%

Poll source	Date(s) administered	Sample size	Margin of error	Bob Corker (R)	Jim Cooper (D)	Other	Undecided
Public Policy Polling	February 9–13, 2011	500	±4.4%	50%	32%	—	22%

Poll source	Date(s) administered	Sample size	Margin of error	Bob Corker (R)	Harold Ford, Jr. (D)	Other	Undecided
Public Policy Polling	February 9–13, 2011	500	±4.4%	55%	32%	—	14%

Poll source	Date(s) administered	Sample size	Margin of error	Bob Corker (R)	Bart Gordon (D)	Other	Undecided
Public Policy Polling	February 9–13, 2011	500	±4.4%	52%	29%	—	19%

Poll source	Date(s) administered	Sample size	Margin of error	Bob Corker (R)	Al Gore (D)	Other	Undecided
Public Policy Polling	February 9–13, 2011	500	±4.4%	53%	38%	—	9%

Poll source	Date(s) administered	Sample size	Margin of error	Bob Corker (R)	Tim McGraw (D)	Other	Undecided
Public Policy Polling	February 9–13, 2011	500	±4.4%	50%	28%	—	22%

=== Results ===
Despite the TN Democratic Party encouraging write-in voting, the general election only saw 0.05% cast write-in votes. Clayton significantly underperformed compared to Barack Obama, running for re-election to the presidency on the same day. Clayton got about 9% and 254,827 votes fewer than Obama.

United States Senate election in Tennessee, 2012
Party	Candidate	Votes	%	±%
Republican	Bob Corker (incumbent)	1,506,443	64.89%	+14.18%
Democratic	Mark Clayton	705,882	30.41%	−17.59%
Green	Martin Pleasant	38,472	1.66%	+1.52%
Independent	Shaun Crowell	20,936	0.90%	N/A
Constitution	Kermit Steck	18,620	0.80%	N/A
Independent	James Higdon	8,085	0.35%	N/A
Independent	Michael Joseph Long	8,080	0.35%	N/A
Independent	Troy Stephen Scoggin	7,148	0.31%	N/A
Independent	David Gatchell	6,523	0.28%	N/A
n/a	Write-ins	1,288	0.05%	N/A
Total votes		2,321,477	100.00%	N/A
Republican hold				

=== By county ===
County	Bob Corker Republican		Mark Clayton Democratic		Others Independent		Margin	Total votes
County	%	#	%	#	%	#	Margin	Total votes
Anderson	70.11%	19,604	23.95%	6,698	5.94%	1,660	12,906	27,962
Bedford	73.23%	9,671	23.09%	3,050	3.68%	486	6,621	13,207
Benton	62.67%	3,746	32.52%	1,944	4.80%	287	1,802	5,977
Bledsoe	73.59%	3,069	23.05%	961	3.36%	140	2,108	4,170
Blount	76.80%	35,846	17.77%	8,295	5.43%	2,536	27,551	46,677
Bradley	81.56%	28,186	15.33%	5,299	3.10%	1,072	22,887	34,557
Campbell	74.06%	8,336	21.42%	2,411	4.51%	508	5,925	11,255
Cannon	70.26%	3,199	23.96%	1,091	5.78%	263	2,108	4,553
Carroll	68.21%	6,910	27.60%	2,796	4.19%	424	4,114	10,130
Carter	79.17%	14,874	16.54%	3,107	4.30%	807	11,767	18,788
Cheatham	72.81%	10,544	21.63%	3,132	5.56%	805	7,412	14,481
Chester	75.43%	4,572	20.89%	1,266	3.68%	223	3,306	6,061
Claiborne	76.45%	7,219	19.15%	1,808	4.41%	416	5,411	9,443
Clay	67.23%	1,676	28.64%	714	4.13%	103	962	2,493
Cocke	79.92%	8,396	16.24%	1,706	3.84%	403	6,690	10,505
Coffee	71.38%	13,227	24.22%	4,488	4.40%	815	8,739	18,530
Crockett	73.94%	3,623	23.43%	1,148	2.63%	129	2,475	4,900
Cumberland	75.94%	17,900	19.02%	4,483	5.04%	1,188	13,417	23,571
Davidson	47.80%	111,176	45.42%	105,631	6.78%	15,778	5,545	232,585
Decatur	67.83%	2,735	28.20%	1,137	3.97%	160	1,598	4,032
DeKalb	67.92%	3,836	26.96%	1,523	5.12%	289	2,313	5,648
Dickson	68.83%	11,471	25.58%	4,264	5.58%	931	7,207	16,666
Dyer	74.41%	9,570	22.70%	2,919	2.90%	373	6,651	12,862
Fayette	71.94%	12,828	24.72%	4,407	3.34%	596	8,421	17,831
Fentress	79.05%	4,996	17.71%	1,119	3.24%	205	3,877	6,320
Franklin	68.92%	10,312	27.35%	4,092	3.73%	558	6,220	14,962
Gibson	69.03%	12,473	27.65%	4,996	3.32%	600	7,477	18,069
Giles	66.00%	6,494	29.71%	2,923	4.29%	422	3,571	9,839
Grainger	78.38%	5,318	17.50%	1,187	4.13%	280	4,131	6,785
Greene	77.08%	17,614	18.31%	4,185	4.61%	1,053	13,429	22,852
Grundy	63.62%	2,453	32.78%	1,264	3.60%	139	1,189	3,856
Hamblen	77.42%	14,547	19.22%	3,612	3.35%	630	10,935	18,789
Hamilton	66.52%	91,497	30.22%	41,570	3.25%	4,472	49,927	137,539
Hancock	79.91%	1,456	15.97%	291	4.12%	75	1,165	1,822
Hardeman	53.49%	4,785	41.50%	3,712	5.01%	448	1,073	8,945
Hardin	75.36%	7,534	21.47%	2,146	3.17%	317	5,388	9,997
Hawkins	75.23%	14,344	21.20%	4,042	3.58%	682	10,302	19,068
Haywood	45.60%	3,180	51.87%	3,617	2.52%	176	-437	6,973
Henderson	75.52%	7,103	21.06%	1,981	3.41%	321	5,122	9,405
Henry	67.86%	7,934	27.98%	3,271	4.17%	487	4,663	11,692
Hickman	65.86%	4,675	27.68%	1,965	6.45%	458	2,710	7,098
Houston	55.23%	1,558	39.88%	1,125	4.89%	138	433	2,821
Humphreys	58.31%	3,786	35.42%	2,300	6.27%	407	1,486	6,493
Jackson	62.97%	2,282	31.10%	1,127	5.93%	215	1,155	3,624
Jefferson	77.48%	12,811	18.09%	2,991	4.43%	733	9,820	16,535
Johnson	77.73%	4,456	17.60%	1,009	4.67%	268	3,447	5,733
Knox	69.89%	114,940	23.38%	38,459	6.73%	11,071	76,481	164,470
Lake	55.54%	1,062	39.85%	762	4.60%	88	300	1,912
Lauderdale	59.44%	4,671	36.51%	2,869	4.06%	319	1,802	7,859
Lawrence	73.45%	9,867	23.23%	3,120	3.32%	446	6,747	13,433
Lewis	68.41%	3,036	25.33%	1,124	6.26%	278	1,912	4,438
Lincoln	73.30%	9,155	22.55%	2,816	4.15%	518	6,339	12,489
Loudon	80.08%	17,015	15.41%	3,274	4.51%	959	13,741	21,248
Macon	78.66%	4,854	17.02%	1,050	4.33%	267	3,804	6,171
Madison	59.12%	22,629	37.72%	14,439	3.16%	1,208	8,190	38,276
Marion	66.59%	6,608	30.18%	2,995	3.22%	320	3,613	9,923
Marshall	66.67%	6,696	28.44%	2,856	4.89%	491	3,840	10,043
Maury	62.69%	19,992	32.12%	10,243	5.19%	1,654	9,749	31,889
McMinn	78.09%	13,422	18.26%	3,139	3.65%	627	10,283	17,188
McNairy	71.67%	6,812	25.35%	2,409	2.98%	283	4,403	9,504
Meigs	75.55%	2,799	21.57%	799	2.89%	107	2,000	3,705
Monroe	74.59%	11,845	20.06%	3,186	5.35%	850	8,659	15,881
Montgomery	60.12%	30,923	34.79%	17,893	5.09%	2,618	13,030	51,434
Moore	76.06%	2,036	20.32%	544	3.62%	97	1,492	2,677
Morgan	75.35%	4,626	20.41%	1,253	4.23%	260	3,373	6,139
Obion	66.96%	7,710	26.92%	3,100	6.11%	704	4,610	11,514
Overton	67.78%	4,372	27.86%	1,797	4.36%	281	2,575	6,450
Perry	66.51%	1,529	28.49%	655	5.00%	115	874	2,299
Pickett	75.39%	1,740	21.32%	492	3.29%	76	1,248	2,308
Polk	70.64%	4,143	25.80%	1,513	3.56%	209	2,630	5,865
Putnam	71.12%	16,703	23.02%	5,406	5.86%	1,377	11,297	23,486
Rhea	79.78%	7,989	17.03%	1,705	3.19%	320	6,284	10,014
Roane	74.66%	15,075	20.89%	4,218	4.45%	899	10,857	20,192
Robertson	72.58%	17,722	22.87%	5,584	4.55%	1,110	12,138	24,416
Rutherford	65.50%	61,962	29.32%	27,731	5.18%	4,904	34,231	94,597
Scott	80.24%	4,768	16.39%	974	3.37%	200	3,794	5,942
Sequatchie	76.19%	3,652	20.09%	963	3.71%	178	2,689	4,793
Sevier	79.80%	26,266	16.09%	5,296	4.11%	1,353	20,970	32,915
Shelby	43.90%	152,612	52.14%	181,253	3.96%	13,776	-28,641	347,641
Smith	68.90%	4,403	26.87%	1,717	4.23%	270	2,686	6,390
Stewart	62.72%	3,011	32.41%	1,556	4.87%	234	1,455	4,801
Sullivan	75.69%	43,329	20.48%	11,725	3.83%	2,195	31,604	57,249
Sumner	75.22%	46,321	20.49%	12,616	4.30%	2,646	33,705	61,583
Tipton	73.15%	16,480	23.36%	5,264	3.49%	786	11,216	22,530
Trousdale	63.78%	1,615	31.52%	798	4.70%	119	817	2,532
Unicoi	75.92%	4,939	19.17%	1,247	4.92%	320	3,692	6,506
Union	77.30%	4,093	18.68%	989	4.02%	213	3,104	5,295
Van Buren	65.53%	1,321	30.95%	624	3.52%	71	697	2,016
Warren	67.62%	7,905	27.46%	3,210	4.92%	575	4,695	11,690
Washington	72.98%	32,637	22.07%	9,869	4.95%	2,215	22,768	44,721
Wayne	78.86%	3,891	17.67%	872	3.47%	171	3,019	4,934
Weakley	67.60%	8,011	27.64%	3,276	4.76%	564	4,735	11,851
White	70.04%	6,039	24.51%	2,113	5.45%	470	3,926	8,622
Williamson	77.22%	72,402	17.91%	16,789	4.87%	4,570	55,613	93,761
Wilson	74.31%	36,993	21.08%	10,497	4.61%	2,294	26,496	49,784
Total	64.89%	1,506,443	30.41%	705,882	4.70%	109,152	800,561	2,321,477

==== Counties that flipped from Democratic to Republican ====
- Cannon (Largest city: Woodbury)
- Crockett (Largest city: Bells)
- DeKalb (Largest city: Smithville)
- Dickson (Largest city: Dickson)
- Franklin (Largest city: Winchester)
- Giles (Largest city: Pulaski)
- Henry (Largest city: Paris)
- Hickman (Largest city: Centerville)
- Lewis (Largest city: Hohenwald)
- Marion (Largest city: Jasper)
- Marshall (Largest city: Lewisburg)
- Warren (Largest city: McMinnville)
- White (Largest city: Sparta)
- Benton (largest municipality: Camden)
- Clay (largest municipality: Celina)
- Grundy (largest municipality: Altamont)
- Humphreys (largest municipality: Waverly)
- Lake (largest municipality: Tiptonville)
- Lauderdale (largest municipality: Ripley)
- Overton (largest municipality: Livingston)
- Perry (largest municipality: Linden)
- Smith (largest municipality: Carthage)
- Stewart (largest municipality: Dover)
- Trousdale (largest municipality: Hartsville)
- Van Buren (largest municipality: Spencer)
- Houston (largest city: Erin)
- Jackson (largest town: Gainesboro)
- Hardeman (largest city: Bolivar)
- Macon (Largest city: Lafayette)
- Montgomery (Largest city: Clarksville)
- Sequatchie (Largest city: Dunlap)
- Davidson (largest city: Nashville)

==== By congressional district ====
Corker carried eight of nine congressional districts, including one that elected a Democrat.

District	Corker	Clayton	Representative
1st	76.58%	19.24%	
1st	76.58%	19.24%	Phil Roe
2nd	72.75%	21.24%	John J. Duncan, Jr.
3rd	70.60%	25.60%	Chuck Fleischmann
4th	69.30%	26.31%	Scott DesJarlais
5th	50.21%	43.32%	Jim Cooper
6th	73.32%	22.04%	Diane Black
7th	69.62%	25.75%	Marsha Blackburn
8th	70.26%	26.40%	Stephen Fincher
9th	28.56%	67.00%	Steve Cohen

== See also ==
- 2012 United States presidential election in Tennessee
- 2012 Tennessee elections
- 2012 United States elections
